= Mutiara Selatan =

Passenger train service in Indonesia since 1972

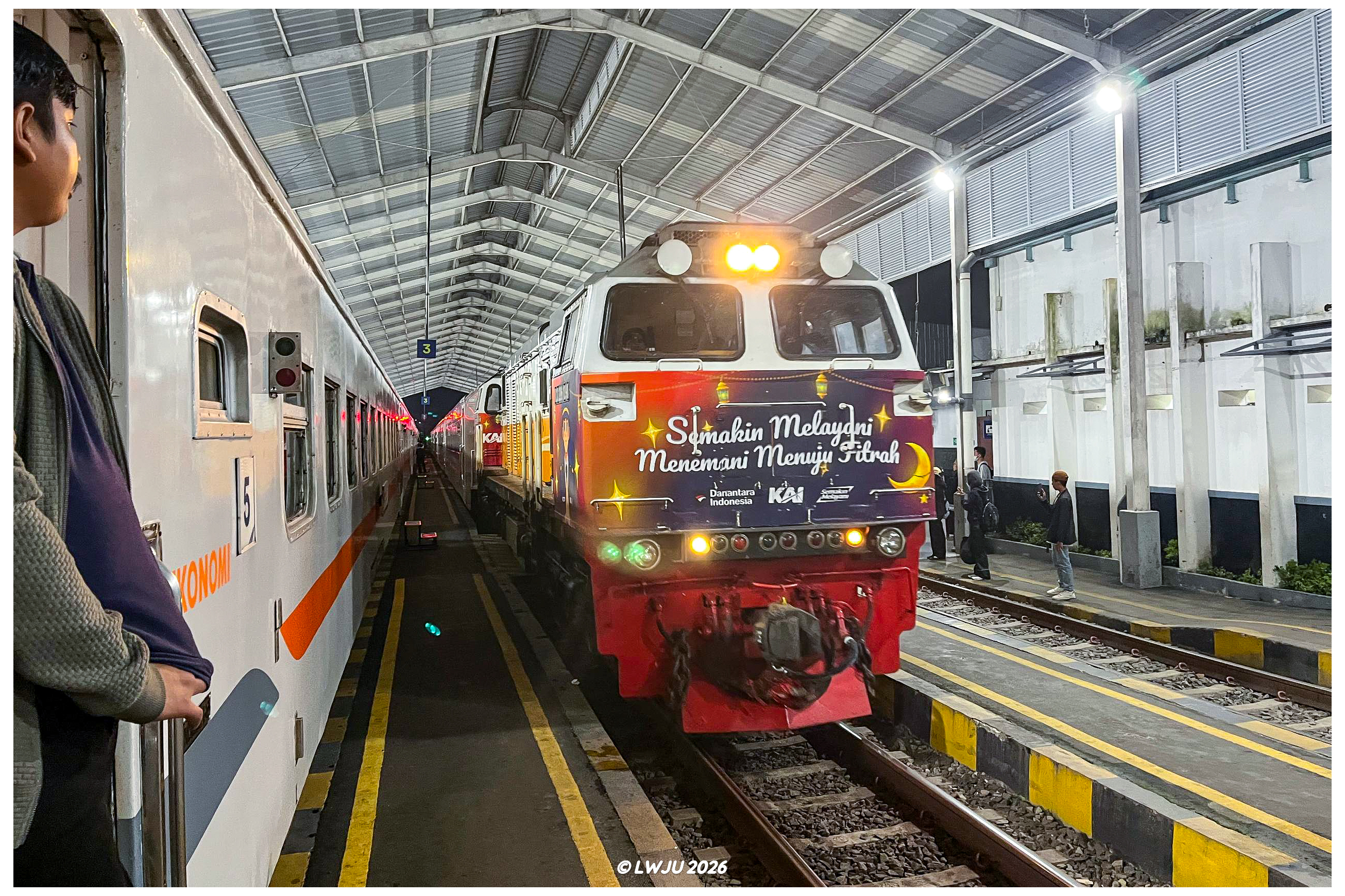
- 71 Mutiara Selatan entering Tasikmalaya, 2026

Overview
- Service type: Inter-city rail
- Status: Operational
- First service: 17 August 1972
- Current operator: Kereta Api Indonesia

Route
- Termini: Surabaya Gubeng; Bandung
- Distance travelled: 696 km (432 mi)
- Average journey time: 10 hours, 53 minutes
- Service frequency: 1x Daily round-trip
- Train number: 71–72

On-board services
- Classes: Executive & Premium Economy
- Seating arrangements: 50 seats arranged in a 2–2 configuration (Executive Class). Seats are reclinable and rotatable.; 80 seats arranged in a 2–2 configuration, with 40 seats facing forward and 40 facing backward (Premium Economy Class). Seats are reclinable.
- Catering facilities: On-board cafe and trolley service
- Observation facilities: Duplex panoramic glass, with blinds and a heat insulating laminated layer
- Other facilities: Fire extinguishers, Air conditioners, toilets, pillows, and blankets

Technical
- Rolling stock: CC206
- Track gauge: 1,067 mm (3 ft 6 in)
- Operating speed: 70–120 km/h (43–75 mph)
Route map

Mutiara Selatan (also known as Mutsel or in English is Southern Pearl or Pearl of the South) is an executive and premium economy class passenger train service operated by Kereta Api Indonesia, that serves the Surabaya Gubeng–Bandung route via the southern route of Java. Launched on Indonesian Independence Day 1972 (17th August 1972), it is the 2nd oldest passenger train service in Indonesia after Bima, which still operates under the same name since 1 June 1967.

== History ==
=== Mutiara Selatan (1972–2018) ===
Mutiara Selatan was first operated on 17 August 1972, serving the Bandung–Surabaya Gubeng route, it offered 2 service classes: executive and business. On October 1999, the train served business class only. From 2014 to 2016, the Mutiara Selatan business class trains were used to operate the Sarangan Express train.

On 28 September 2016, following the birthday of PT KAI, KAI changed its service from business class to economy plus. The economy plus trains used at the time were made by the PT INKA in 2016 before the change to the original class—there were issues with passenger comfort, namely the narrow distance between seats. The route of this train was extended to Malang starting 3 October 2016.

Mutiara Selatan returned to serve executive class service on 13 March 2017, then operated a series of stainless steel trains made by INKA since 1 April 2019 with executive and premium economy class services.

=== Mutiara Selatan (2019–present) ===
With the release of the latest new train travel chart 2019 by the Directorate General of Railways and KAI as of 1 December 2019, Mutiara Selatan route was extended to Gambir station alongside the Argo Wilis, Malabar, and Turangga trains, with an extended travel time of around 20 hours and 20 minutes from the origin of the route. This change didn't last long, as Mutiara Selatan returned to serve its original route from Surabaya Gubeng to Bandung like before, on the first of September 2020 because the passenger occupancy rate on the Bandung–Jakarta and Surabaya–Malang routes decreased due to the COVID-19 pandemic.

On 1 February 2025, following of the latest train travel chart, the Mutiara Selatan train began exchanging trainsets at the Bandung train depo with the Harina Morning train, which serves the Bandung-Surabaya Pasarturi route via the northern route of Java.

== Stops ==
- Bandung (Start/End)
- Kiaracondong
- Cipeundeuy
- Tasikmalaya
- Ciamis
- Banjar
- Sidareja
- Maos
- Kroya
- Gombong
- Kebumen
- Kutoarjo
- Yogyakarta
- Solo Balapan
- Madiun
- Nganjuk
- Kertosono
- Jombang
- Mojokerto
- Surabaya Gubeng (Start/End)

== Accidents & Incidents ==
- On 19 January 1974, the B5 Mutiara Selatan train crashed into the rear of the S3 Bima I train at Soka Station, Kebumen.The incident began when the S3 train stopped at Soka Station because its locomotive had been detached to assist Train No. 430, which had broken down on the main line. The station signal operator at Soka left the entry signal in the clear position after handling the S3 train, allowing the B5 train to continue running until it struck the rear of the stationary S3 train in the station yard. As a result of the accident, one passenger was seriously injured, while 33 other passengers and two employees of PT KAI (then PJKA) suffered minor injuries.
- On Thursday, 4 May 1995 at approximately 03.47 local time, Mutiara Selatan Train No. 52, hauled by locomotive CC201 06, derailed and overturned at Madiun Station after entering Track 1 at excessive speed. There were no fatalities in the incident, but seven people sustained minor injuries. Following the accident, railway traffic on the southern line was completely disrupted for several days due to track damage and derailed carriages blocking the line.
- On 28 January 2011 at 02.00 local time, Mutiara Selatan train No. 103 collided with the Kutojaya Selatan train No.174 on track 3 at Langen station, Langensari, Banjar, West Java. The accident began when Train No. 103 failed to stop at the station’s entry signal, where it should have waited for a green aspect signal to proceed directly through Track 2. As a result, Train No. 103 continued forward and struck Train No. 174, which was in the process of entering Track 3. The collision caused severe damage to both locomotives and several passenger cars. Three people were killed and 26 others were injured.
- On 1 January 2023, the body of a man was found near a railway crossing in Palur Village, Mojolaban, Sukoharjo. PT Kereta Api Indonesia (PT KAI) reported that the victim had fallen from Mutiara Selatan train while traveling from Yogyakarta Station to Mojokerto Station with his mother. The victim fell after opening the carriage door while standing on the vestibule platform, allegedly mistaking it for the toilet door. However, PT KAI denied this claim and stated that no staff negligence was found in connection with the incident.

== See also ==
- Argo Wilis
- Turangga
- Lodaya
- Malabar
- Harina
