= Pasundan (train) =

- Pasundan train with the economy new generation modification, Oct 2026

Overview
- Service type: Inter-city rail
- Status: Operational (regular & addition)
- First service: 18 February 1996
- Current operator: Kereta Api Indonesia

Route
- Termini: Kiaracondong; Surabaya Gubeng
- Distance travelled: 691 km (429 mil)
- Average journey time: 13 hours 44 minutes
- Service frequency: 1 daily each way (morning schedule to Kiaracondong & midday schedule to Surabaya)
- Train numbers: 275–276 (regular); 7021-7022 (PSO Eid); 7023-7024 (additional non PSO)

On-board services
- Class: economy
- Catering facilities: snack, food, & drink service

Technical
- Rolling stock: CC203; CC201
- Track gauge: 1067 mm
- Operating speed: 70 km/h (43 mph) - 100 km/h (62 mph)
Route map

Pasundan train is an passenger train with the economy class that operated by Kereta Api Indonesia which between Kiaracondong in Bandung and Surabaya Gubeng in Surabaya. This train offer 1x travel each way only morning schedule around 691 km (429 mil) in 13 hours 44 minutes.

The Pasundan train will Support with the Argo Wilis which that from Bandung Hall to Surabaya Gubeng, however the Pasundan train that route from Kiaracondong.

== History ==
=== Pasundan train (1996 - 2019) ===
The Pasundan train was first time operate by KAI on 18 February 1996 during the homecoming season Eid al-Fitr in 1996. to accompany the Badrasurya train—an abbreviation of the route it runs, namely Greater Bandung–Surabaya. The Badrasurya train is an economy class train service that has been operating since the 1970s, but the train's departure point is at Bandung Station. Due to the service simplification policy implemented by Perumka, the Badrasurya train stopped operating, leaving only the Pasundan train serving the area.

On 1 December 2019, following the enactment of new train travel chart 2019, the Pasundan train exchanged trains with the Kahuripan at Kiaracondong. On the same date, the Pasundan train began serving passengers in both directions at Ngawi, after previously only serving passengers heading towards Surabaya.

=== Pasundan train (2023 - Present) ===
On 1 June 2023 following the enactment of new train travel chart 2023, the Pasundan train wasn't stopped at Wonokromo again.

Since the revocation of the public service obligation subsidy on 1 January 2019 until the implementation of Gapeka 2025, the Pasundan train hasn't received any rejuvenation and still uses a split AC economy train set with 106 seats.

On 1 August 2025, the Pasundan train is one of the trains that uses the latest generation of economy class trains, modified by Balai Yasa, with a capacity of 72 seats. Unlike with the Lodaya use the New Generation Stainless Steel since 2024, the trains were originally Ministry of Transportation economy trains with a capacity of 80 seats which were then modified by Balai Yasa Manggarai. Thus, Pasundan trains are no longer interchangeable with Kahuripan, so that the old trains are diverted to operate Kahuripan trains and Greater Bandung Commuter Line.

== List of the Station ==
On 1 February 2025 following the enactment of new train travel chart 2025, the Pasundan train depart from Surabaya to Kiaracondong at Fajar, while the Pasundan train depart from Kiaracondong to Surabaya at Midday.

- Kiaracondong (Start/End)
- Rancaekek
- Leles
- Cibatu
- Cipeundeuy
- Tasikmalaya
- Ciamis
- Banjar
- Sidareja
- Jeruklegi (only bound from Bandung)
- Maos
- Kroya
- Gombong
- Kebumen
- Kutoarjo
- Wates
- Lempuyangan
- Klaten
- Purwosari
- Sragen
- Walikukun
- Ngawi
- Madiun
- Caruban
- Nganjuk
- Kertosono
- Jombang
- Mojokerto
- Surabaya Gubeng (Start/End)

== Accident & Incident ==
- On 27 June 2014 at 07.45 local time, the Pasundan train derailed into the bridge No. 1055 km 236+100/400 road section between Cipeundeuy–Cirahayu, crossing Bandung–Banjar, operational area Daop II Bandung. According to the Final Report of the National Transportation Safety Committee, this incident was caused by the presence of three consecutive weathered sleepers at BH 1055, Km 236+100/400 so that they were unable to withstand the dynamic forces of the train. Several contributing factors were, the absence of speed limiter signs, as well as the failure of rail connections due to poor welding.
- On 11 January 2016, the Pasundan train crashed into a sand-laden truck at the level crossing Km 369+700/800 between Orangegi Station–Kawunganten Station precisely in Kubangkangkung Village, Kawunganten, Cilacap. This incident didn't cause any fatalities but the Pasundan train was held up at the scene for about 2 hours while waiting for a replacement locomotive from Kroya.
- On 5 April 2016, the Pasundan train derailed on the road section between Leles station–Lebakjero. This incident caused a number of trains to be held up at Cibatu Station.
- On 30 May 2024 around 23.54 local time, There was an incident where a group of football supporters threw things at the Pasundan train while passing JPL 5 Jalan Ambengan, Surabaya City—precisely at Km 3+700/800 on the road section between Surabaya Gubeng–Surabaya Kota. This incident resulted in broken glass on seven Pasundan train facilities.

== See also ==
- Serayu
- Kahuripan
- Kutojaya Selatan
- Argo Wilis
- Lodaya
