= Kutojaya Selatan =

Passenger train service in Indonesia

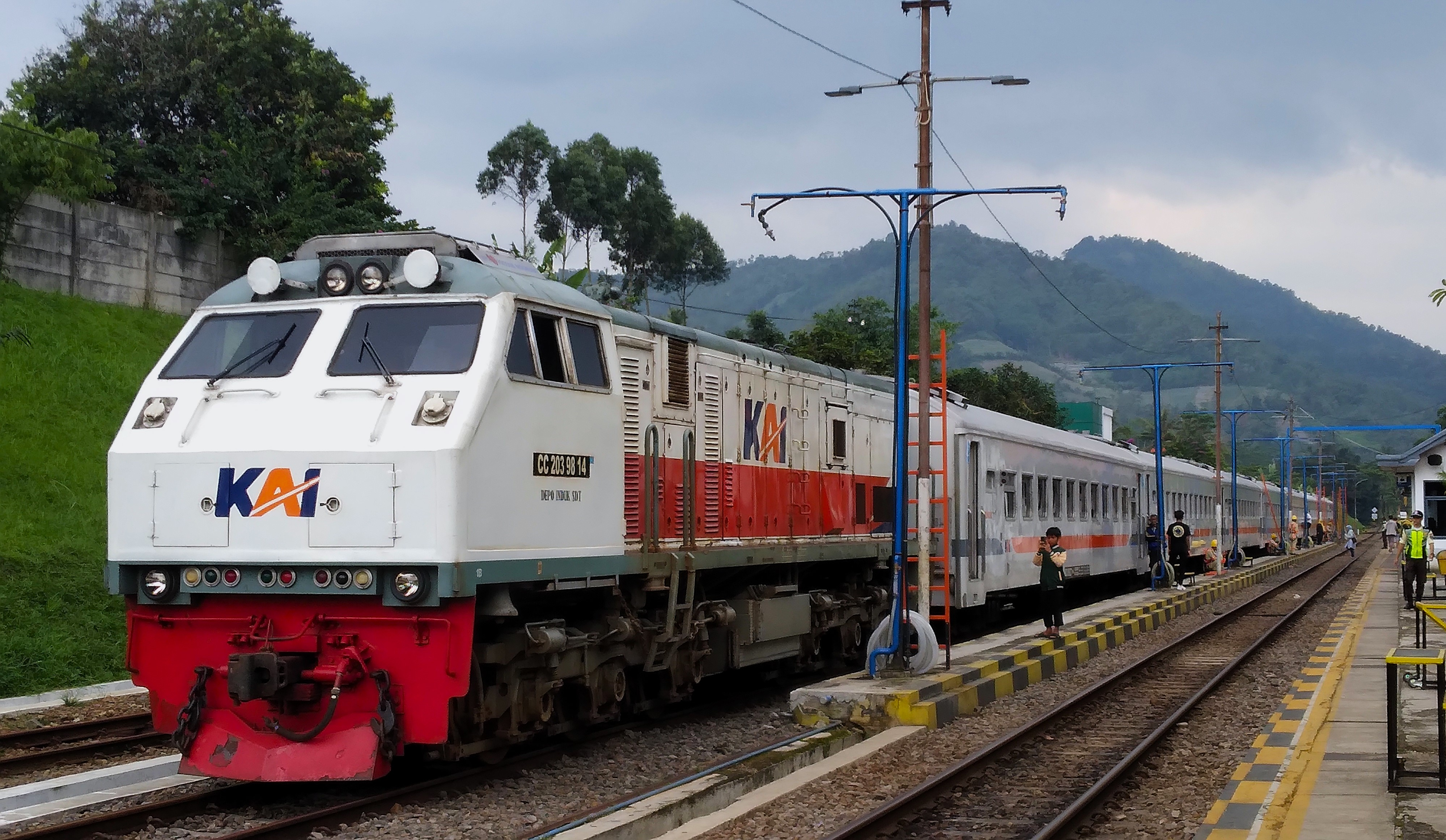
- Southern Kutojaya train at Cipeundeuy, 2025

Overview
- Service type: Inter-city rail
- Status: Operational (regular & addition)
- Predecessor: Sawunggalih Selatan (Southern Sawunggalih)
- First service: 31 May 1977
- Current operator: Kereta Api Indonesia

Route
- Termini: Kiaracondong; Kutoarjo
- Distance travelled: 319 km (198 mil)
- Average journey time: 7 hours 5 minutes
- Service frequency: 1 daily each way (morning schedule only)
- Train number: 291-292

On-board services
- Class: economy
- Catering facilities: snack, food and drink service

Technical
- Rolling stock: CC203; CC201
- Track gauge: 1067 mm
- Operating speed: 50–90 km/h (31–56 mph)
Route map

Kutojaya Selatan ('Southern Kutojaya') is a passenger train with economy class service operated by Kereta Api Indonesia. It runs between Kiaracondong, Bandung and Kutoarjo via the southern route in Java. This train provides daily service in each direction, with a morning schedule covering around 319 km (198 mil) in 7 hours and 5 minutes. The Kutojaya Selatan train serves the route from Kutoarjo to Bandung via Tasikmalaya.

== History ==
Kutojaya is taken from the acronyms Kutoarjo, Jakarta and Raya, and Selatan means 'south', and is taken from its route. The train departs from Bandung rather than Jakarta. Kutojaya Selatan started operated on 31 May 1977.

== Stations ==
On 1 February 2025, the train travel chart for 2025 showed minimum time for travel from Kiaracondong to Kutoarjo for round-trip. The Kutojaya Selatan train was added and operated at the specific day.

- Kiaracondong (Start/End)
- Cipeundeuy
- Tasikmalaya
- Ciamis
- Banjar
- Sidareja
- Maos
- Kroya
- Sumpiuh
- Gombong
- Karanganyar
- Kebumen
- Kutowinangun
- Kutoarjo (Start/End)

== Collision ==
- On 28 January 2011 at 02.00 local time, the Kutojaya Selatan 174 train collided with the Mutiara Selatan (Southern Pearl) 103 train at the Langen station. Both locomotives and several trains were damaged. Three people died and 26 were injured.

== See also ==
- Serayu (train)
- Kahuripan (train)
- Pasundan (train)
- Cikuray (train)
