= Cipeundeuy railway station =

Railway station in Indonesia

Cipeundeuy Station Stasiun Cipeundeuy
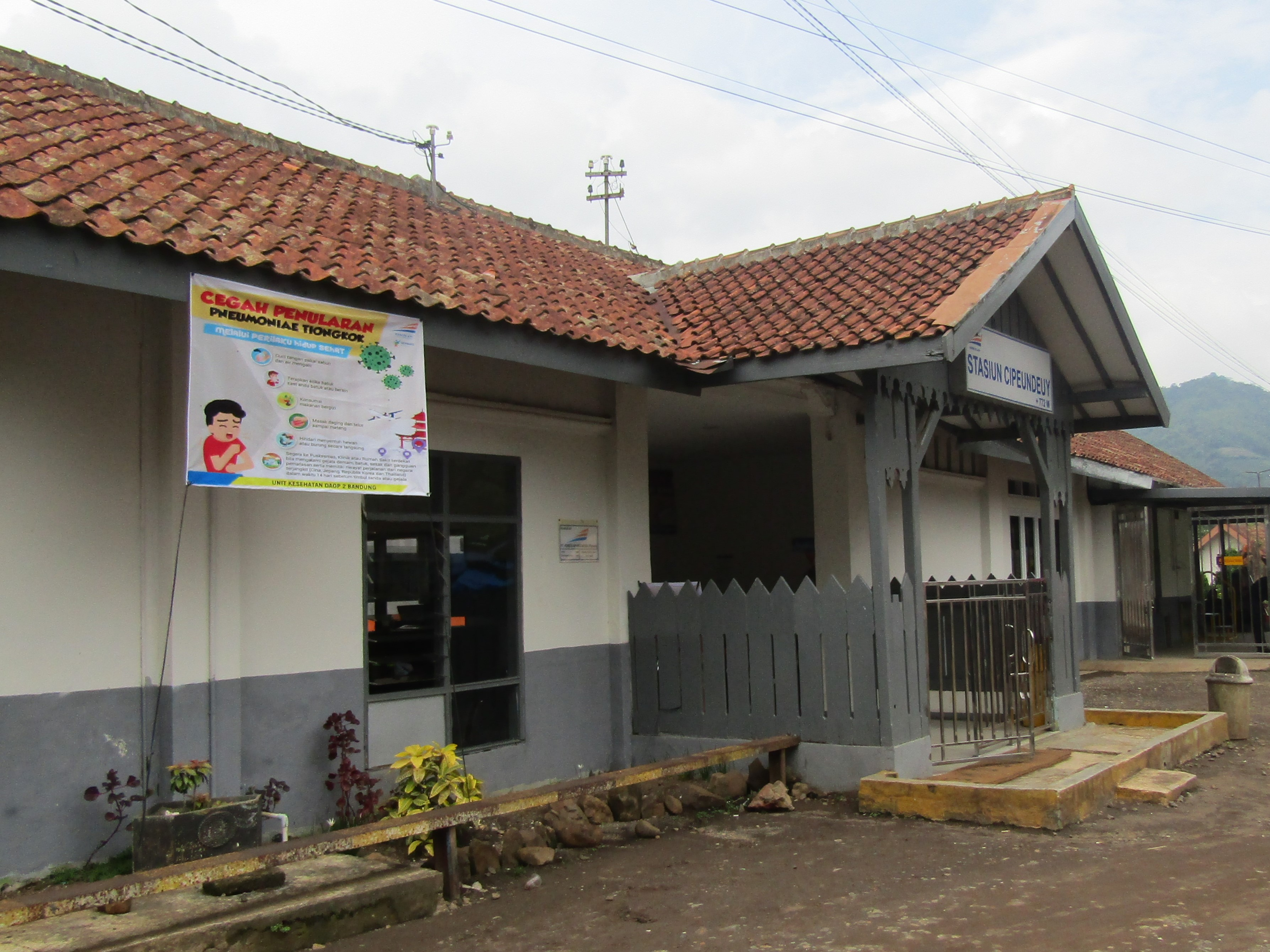
- Main building of Cipeundeuy Station

General information
- Location: Jl. Raya Bandung-Tasikmalaya, Cikarag, Malangbong, Garut Regency; West Java; Indonesia
- Coordinates: 7.0936306°S 108.1006237°E
- Elevation: +772 m (2,533 ft)
- Owner: Kereta Api Indonesia
- Operator: Kereta Api Indonesia
- Line: Padalarang–Kasugihan
- Platforms: 1 side platform 1 island platform
- Tracks: 3

Construction
- Structure type: Ground
- Parking: Available
- Accessible: Available

Other information
- Station code: CPD
- Classification: Class II

History
- Opened: 16 September 1893
- Former names: Tjipeundeuj Halt
Location
- Location within Java

Cipeundeuy Station (CPD) (Sundanese: ᮞ᮪ᮒᮞᮤᮇᮔ᮪ ᮎᮤᮕᮩᮔ᮪ᮓᮩᮚ᮪, romanized: Stasion Cipeundeuy) is a class II railway station located in Cikarag, Malangbong, Garut Regency. The station, which is located at an altitude of +772 meters, is included in the Operational Area II Bandung. This station has three railway tracks.

Despite the station's diminutive size and unassuming appearance, all trains from every classes of service must stop at the station for brake checking. This procedure is mandatory due to the presence of steep gradients on both ends of the station.

This has been carried out since the Dutch East Indies era to the present. However, it was briefly abolished in 1990s as it was deemed inefficient, and the nuisance caused by hawkers and beggars at this station. The absence of brake checkings contributed to the fatal accident of the Galuh and Kahuripan combined train which lost control and went runaway due to brake failures after leaving the station on midnight on 24 October 1995, before crashing at the bridge near the Trowek (now Cirahayu) station.

Since then, to prevent similar accidents, all trains are again mandated to stop at the station.

This station also serves ticket selling and reservations at the counter.

There was also a landslide near this station at the end of February 2009 which resulted in the train journey from Bandung to the east having to be diverted through Cikampek and Cirebon station.

== Services ==
The following is a list of train services at the Cipeundeuy Station.

=== Passengers services ===
- Executive class
  - Argo Wilis, to Bandung and to Surabaya Gubeng
  - Turangga, to Bandung and to Surabaya Gubeng
- Mixed class
  - Malabar, to Bandung and to Malang (executive–economy)
  - Mutiara Selatan, to Bandung and to Surabaya Gubeng (executive–economy)
  - Lodaya, to Bandung and to Solo Balapan (executive–economy)
  - Pangandaran, to Gambir via Bandung and to Banjar (executive–economy)
  - Sangkuriang, to Bandung and to Ketapang (executive–economy)
  - Baturraden Express, to Bandung and to Purwokerto (executive–economy)
- Economy class
  - Kahuripan, to Kiaracondong and to Blitar
  - Pasundan, to Kiaracondong and to Surabaya Gubeng
  - Kutojaya Selatan, to Kiaracondong and to Kutoarjo
  - Serayu, to Pasar Senen via Kiaracondong–Purwakarta and to Purwokerto via Kroya
  - Galunggung, to Kiaracondong and to Tasikmalaya (ended in 2020)

=== Freight services ===
- Over Night Services, to Surabaya Kota via Tasikmalaya–Lempuyangan–Jombang and to Bandung

Preceding station	Kereta Api Indonesia	Following station
Bumiwaluya towards Padalarang	Padalarang–Kasugihan	Cirahayu towards Kasugihan
