= Baturraden Express =

Passenger train service between Jakarta and Banjar via Bandung, Indonesia

- Baturraden Express left from Bandung to Purwokerto via Cikampek–Cirebon Prujakan railway, 2021

Overview
- Service type: Inter-city rail
- Status: Operational (facultative)
- First service: 25 June 2021 (via Cikampek–Cirebon Prujakan railway); 22 December 2022 (via Tasikmalaya)
- Last service: 31 August 2024 (regular)
- Current operator: Kereta Api Indonesia

Route
- Termini: Bandung; Purwokerto
- Distance travelled: 275 km (171 mil)
- Average journey time: 6 hours 42 minutes
- Service frequency: daily each way
- Train number: 205F-208F

On-board services
- Classes: executive and economy
- Seating arrangements: 50 seats arranged 2–2 (executive) seats can recline and rotate; 80 seats arranged 2-2 (economy class)
- Catering facilities: On-board cafe and trolley service

Technical
- Rolling stock: CC206; CC204; CC203
- Track gauge: 1067 mm
- Operating speed: 50-100 km/h (31-62 mph)
Route map
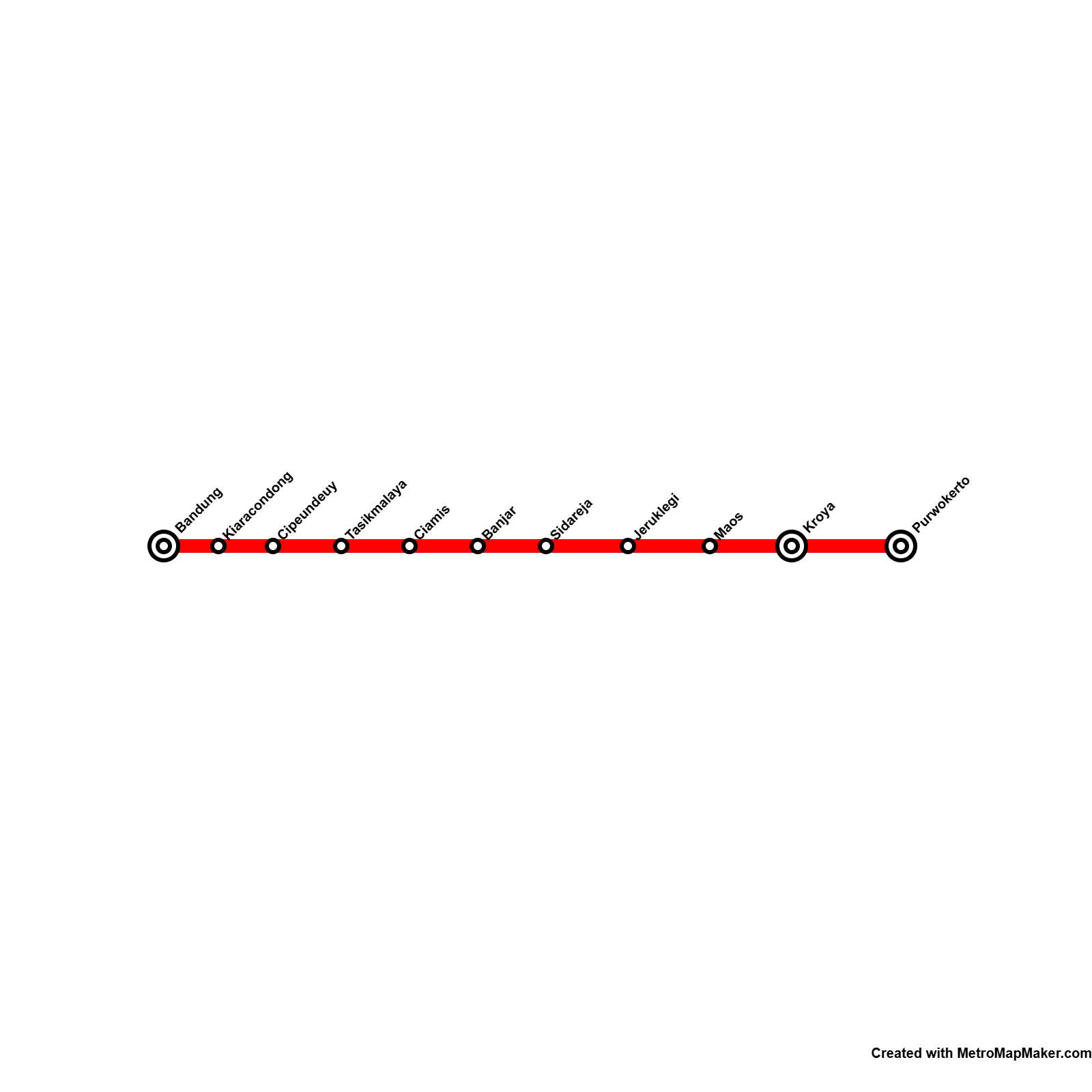

Baturraden Express (Indonesian: Kereta Api Baturraden Ekspres) is an Indonesian passenger train operated by Kereta Api Indonesia. It run between Bandung and Purwokerto via southern Java railway. Despite being listed in the enactment of new train travel chart 2019 on 1 December 2019 and 2021 on 10 February 2021, this train only entered service on 25 June 2021.

The name "Baturraden" is derived from a folktale. Once upon a time, there was a king's son ("raden") who fell in love with a servant ("batur"). However, his parents disapproved of him, and he ended his life in the Banyumas Regency area, namely as "Baturraden" (Baturraden, Banyumas).

== History ==
The Baturraden Express launched by KAI on 25 June 2021 in Purwokerto. The inauguration was carried out by KAI Commissioner Cris Kuntadi, President Director of KAI Didiek Hartantyo, along with Banyumas Regent Achmad Husein. When it was first operated, Baturraden Express served the Purwokerto-Bandung route via the Cikampek–Cirebon Prujakan railway stretching from Cikampek to Cirebon.

During the 2022 Christmas and 2023 New Year holidays, the Baturraden Express line will be diverted to Purwokerto—Bandung via the southern Java line to assist the Serayu (train) on the Bandung–Kroya Station segment. This new route will be operational on 22 December 2022.

As of 1 June 2023 following the enactment of new train travel chart 2023, along with the adjustment of Duksar (Support Facilities) the Baturraden Express is now pulled by CC 203, and the first CC 203 locomotive to pull the Baturraden Express is CC 203 95 02 PWT.

Since 31 August 2024, the Baturraden Express has been temporarily suspended due to low passenger occupancy. This trainset will then be used for the Mutiara Timur train, which runs from Ketapang to Surabaya Pasar Turi, starting on 1 September 2024.

== Stations ==
Baturraden Express route is:

- Bandung (start/end)
- Kiaracondong
- Cipeundeuy
- Tasikmalaya
- Ciamis
- Banjar
- Sidareja
- Jeruklegi
- Maos
- Kroya (for car curtains of locomotive to Bandung or Purwokerto)
- Purwokerto (start/end)

== Tariff ==
The lower fare for the Baturraden Express for the Purwokerto-Bandung line and vice versa for business class is set at Rp 170,000-Rp 220,000 and for executive class at Rp 260,000.00-Rp 320,000. Train ticket fares can vary depending on the distance traveled, subclass/seat position within the train, and the day of departure. In addition, there are special fares that apply two hours before departure for certain routes.
