= Tasikmalaya railway station =

Railway station in Indonesia

Tasikmalaya Station Stasiun Tasikmalaya
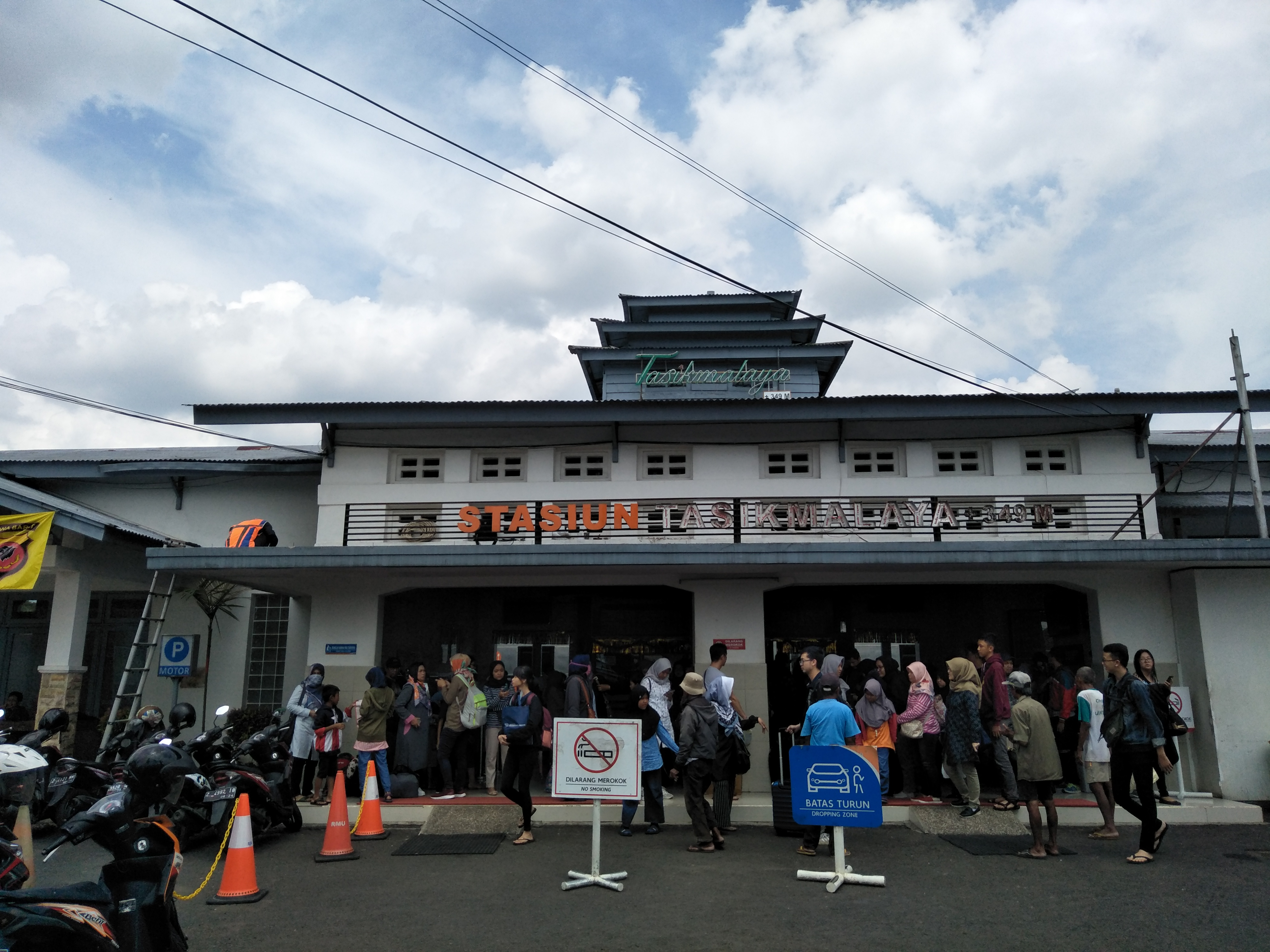
- Tasikmalaya Station

General information
- Other names: Tasik Station
- Location: Jl. Stasiun Tasikmalaya No. 8, Lengkongsari, Tawang, Tasikmalaya; West Java; Indonesia
- Coordinates: 7.3223484°S 108.2238083°E
- Elevation: +349 m (1,145 ft)
- Owner: Kereta Api Indonesia
- Operator: Kereta Api Indonesia
- Line: Padalarang–Kasugihan
- Platforms: 1 side platform 2 island platforms
- Tracks: 7

Construction
- Structure type: Ground
- Parking: Available
- Cycle facilities: Bicycle parking
- Accessible: Available

Other information
- Station code: TSM • 1630
- Classification: Large class type C

History
- Opened: 16 September 1893
Location
- Location within Java

Tasikmalaya Station (TSM) (Sundanese: ᮞ᮪ᮒᮞᮤᮇᮔ᮪ ᮒᮞᮤᮊ᮪ᮙᮜᮚ, romanized: Stasion Tasikmalaya) also known as Tasik Station is a large class type C railway station located in Lengkongsari, Tawang, Tasikmalaya. The station, which is located at an altitude of +349 meters, is included in the Operational Area II Bandung. All trains that pass through the Kroya–Bandung line must stop at this station.

== History ==
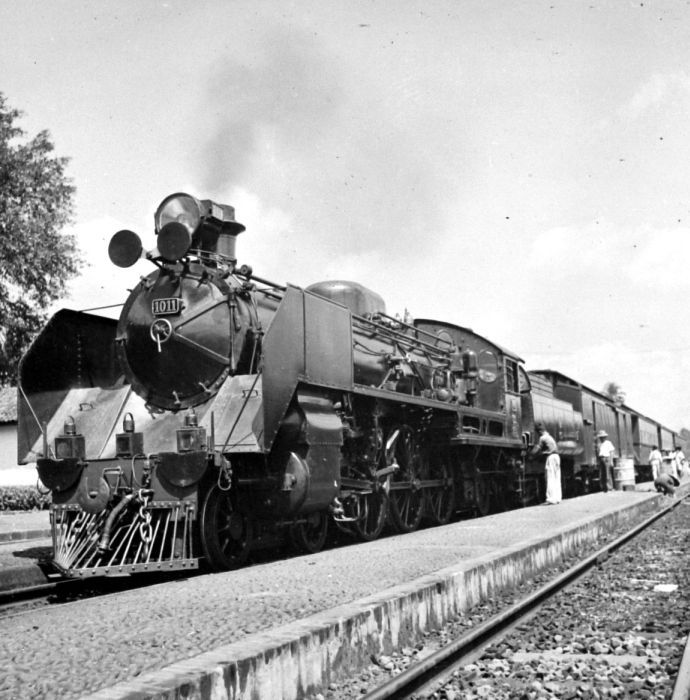
SS10 11 or C53 11 steam locomotive at Tasikmalaya station, 1938

The Staatsspoorwegen continued to exert influence in West Java throughout the 1890s. The Padalarang–Yogyakarta railway line was built to facilitate public transportation-has the characteristics of a route winding through mountains with extreme terrain. On 16 September 1893, the construction of the Cibatu–Tasikmalaya railroad section was completed, and continued with the construction of the railway line to Banjar which was completed on 1 November 1894.

From this station, a branch was built to Singaparna which was inaugurated on 1 July 1911, but it's currently inactive.

== Building and layout ==
The station has seven railway lines with track 2 being a straight track and using an electric signaling system produced by Westinghouse Rail Systems.

The front view of the main station building is very different from other typical Staatsspoorwegen station buildings—possibly already undergoing development—that is, there is a gable roof element with the addition of a three-lapping roof made of wood.

== Services ==
The following is a list of train services at the Tasikmalaya Station.

=== Passenger services ===
- Executive class
  - Argo Wilis, to Bandung and to Surabaya Gubeng
  - Turangga, to Bandung and to Surabaya Gubeng
- Mixed class
  - Lodaya, to Bandung and to Solo Balapan (executive–economy)
  - Malabar, to Bandung and to Malang (executive–economy)
  - Mutiara Selatan, to Bandung and to Surabaya Gubeng (executive–economy)
  - Pangandaran, to Gambir and to Banjar (executive–economy)
  - Baturraden Express, to Purwokerto and to Bandung (executive–economy)
  - Sangkuriang train, to Bandung and to Ketapang (executive–economy)
- Economy class
  - Kahuripan, to Kiaracondong and to Blitar
  - Kutojaya Selatan, to Kiaracondong and to Kutoarjo
  - Pasundan, to Kiaracondong and to Surabaya Gubeng
  - Serayu, to Pasar Senen via Kiaracondong–Purwakarta and to Purwokerto via Kroya

=== Freight services ===
- Over Night Services, to Surabaya Kota via Lempuyangan–Madiun–Jombang and to Bandung

== Gallery ==
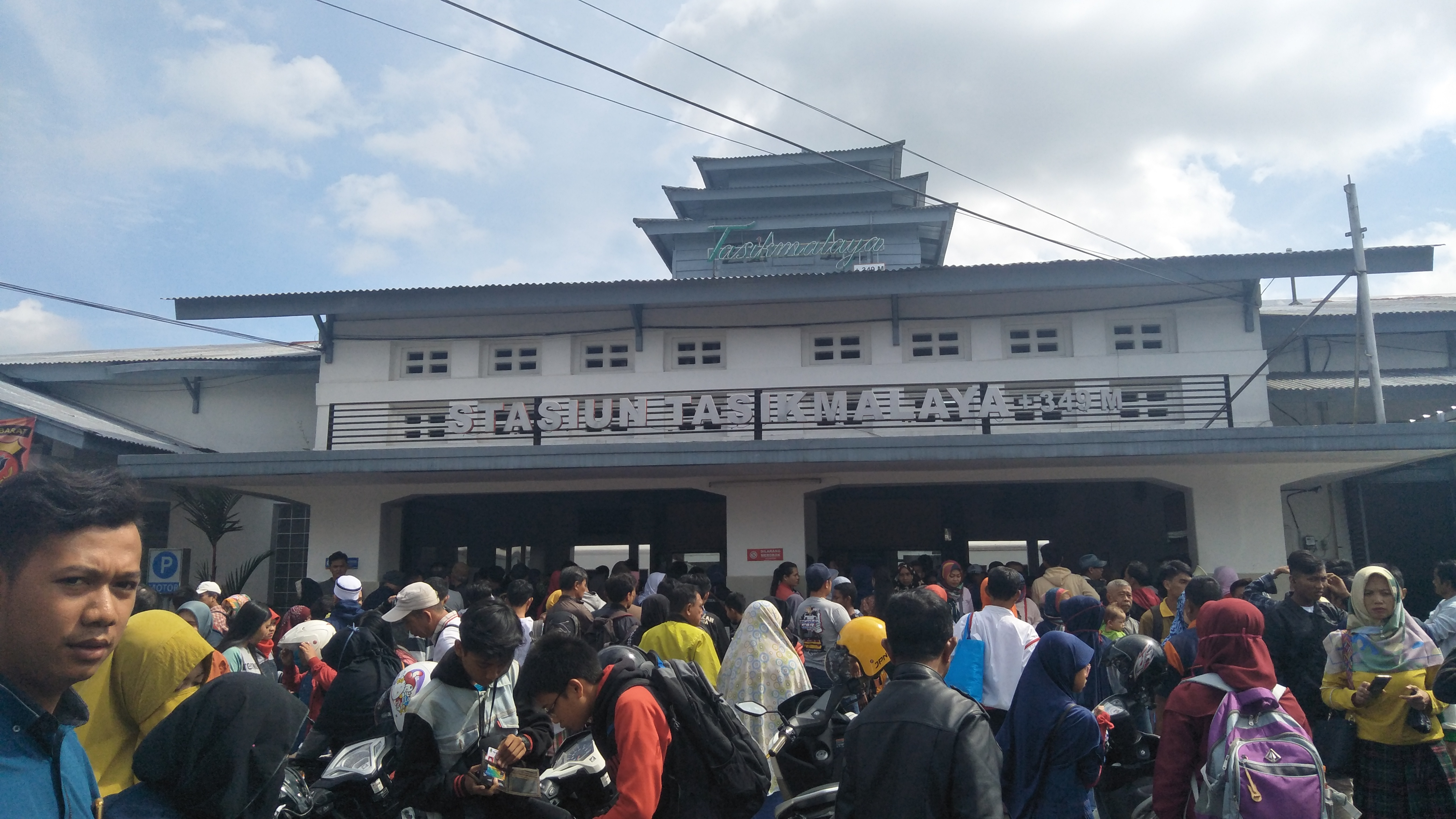
Front view of the station, 2018

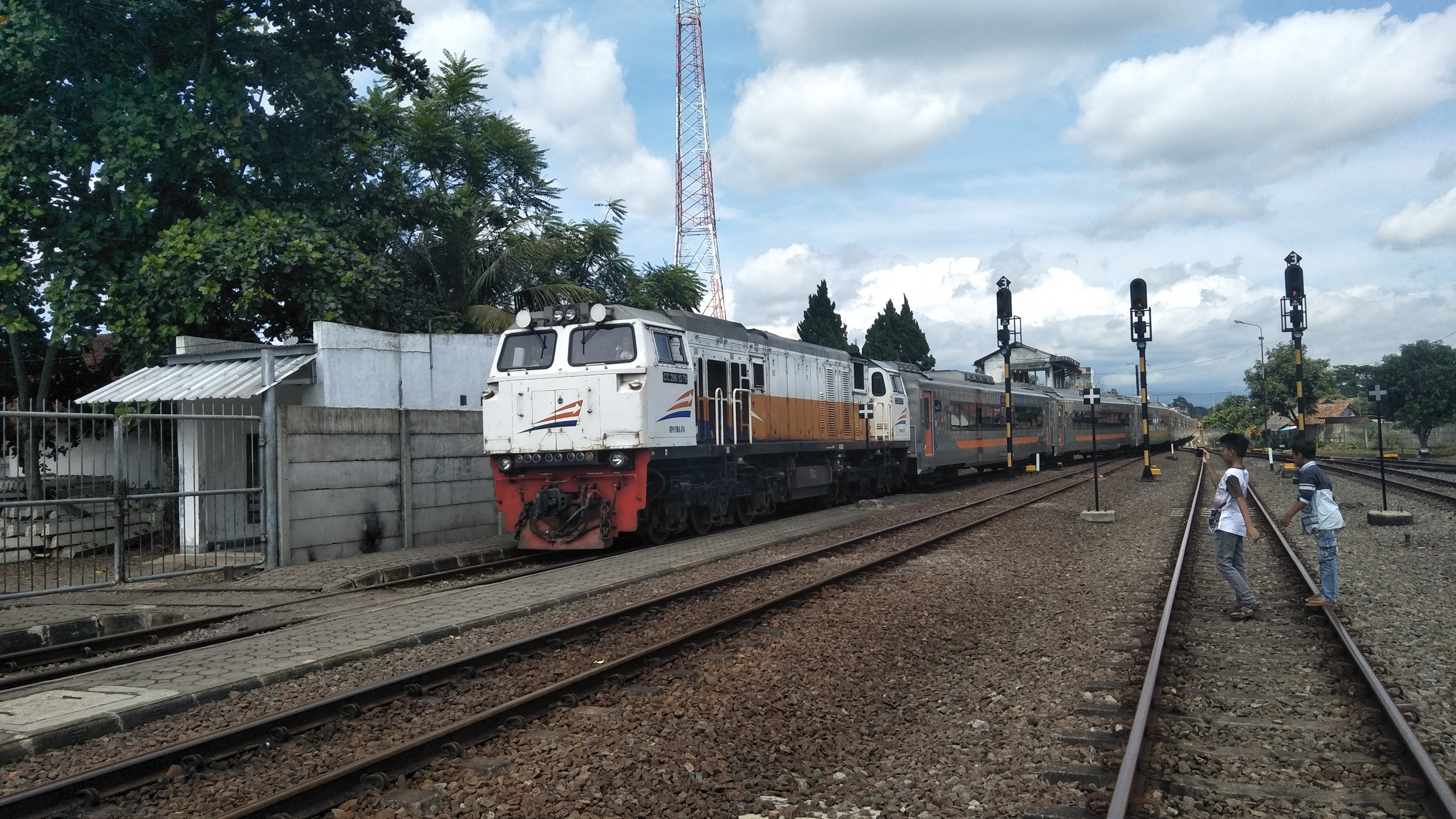
Lodaya train entering Tasikmalaya station, 2018

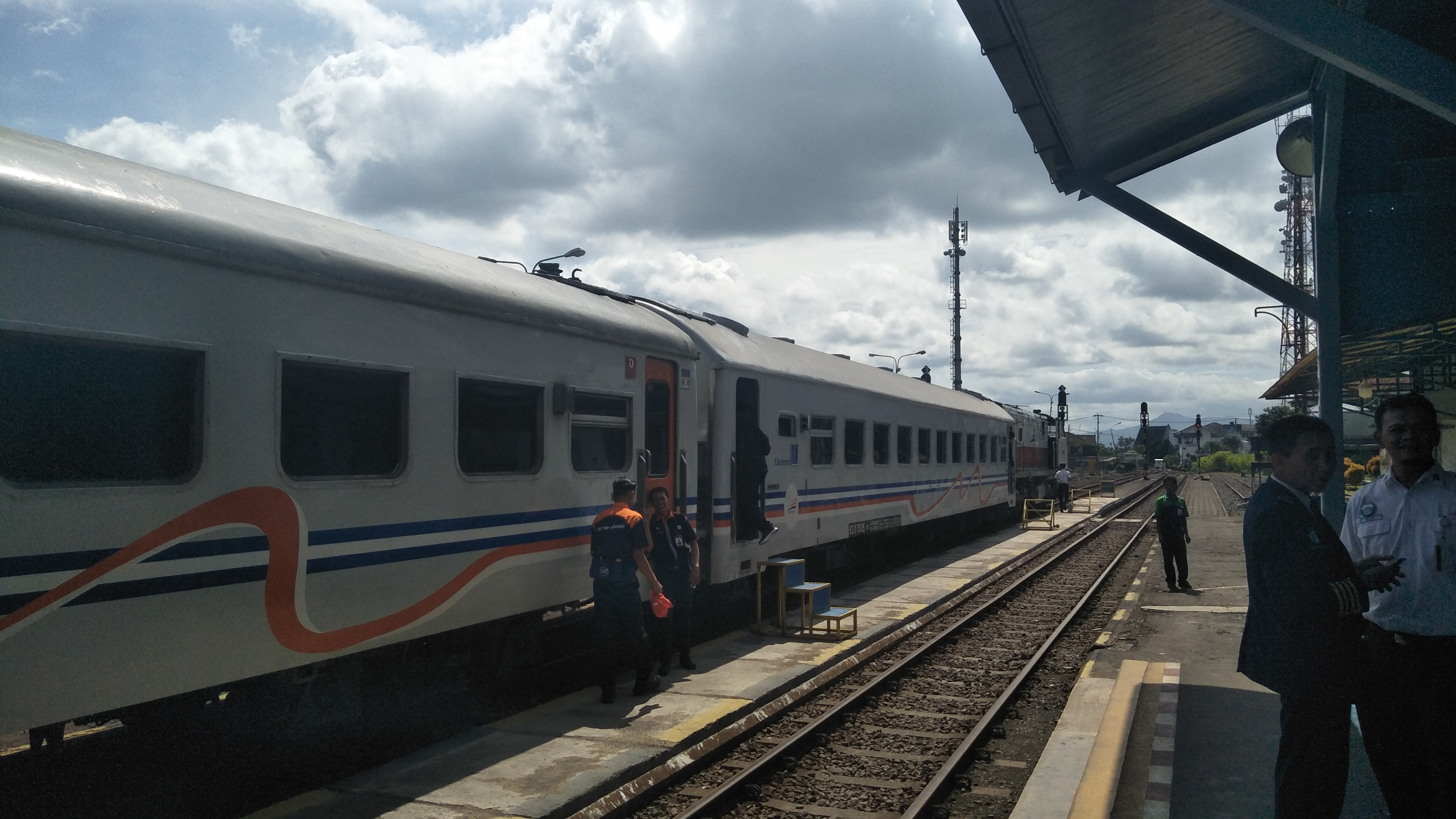
Pasundan train at Tasikmalaya station, 2018

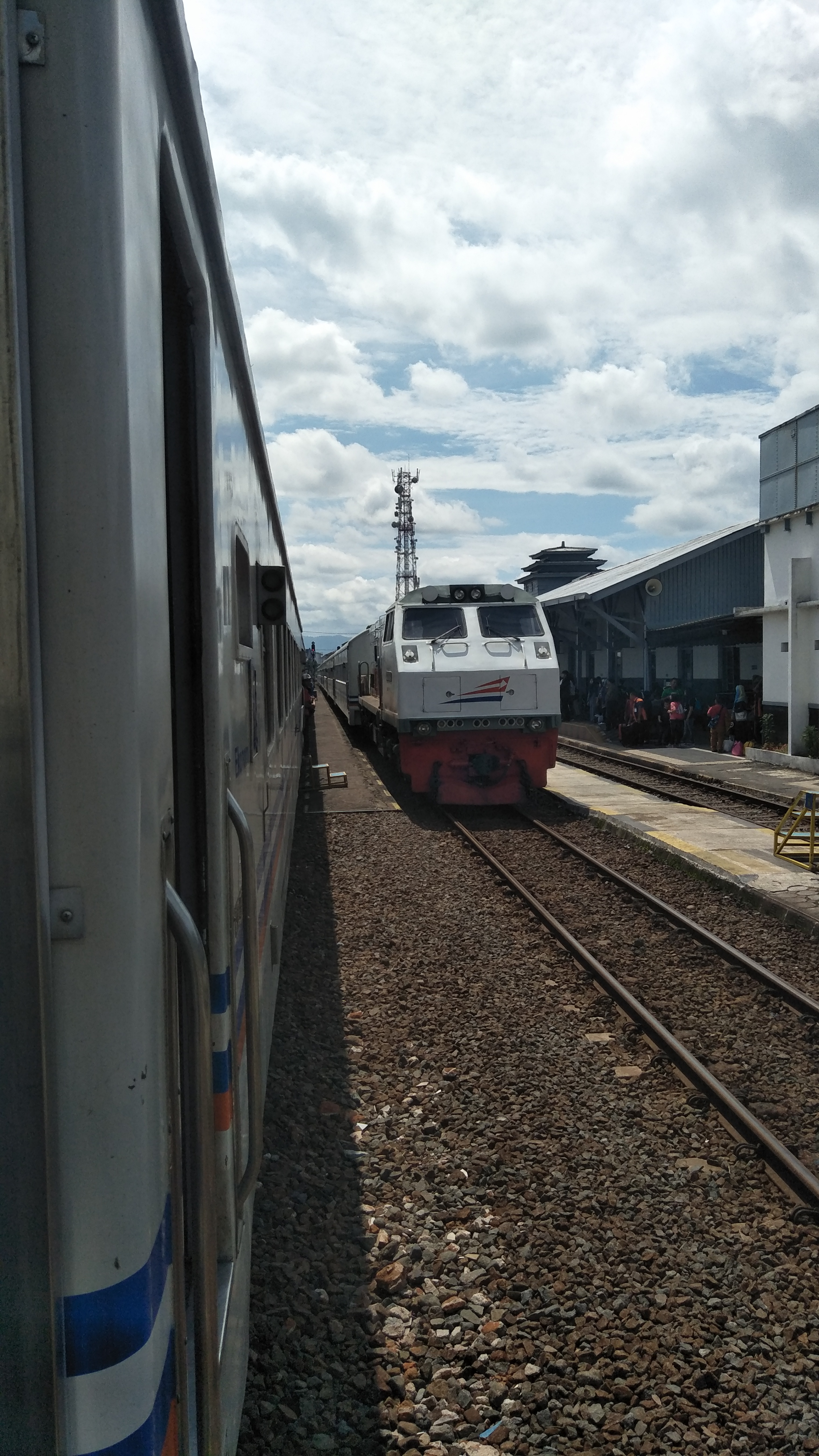
Serayu train entering Tasikmalaya station, 2018

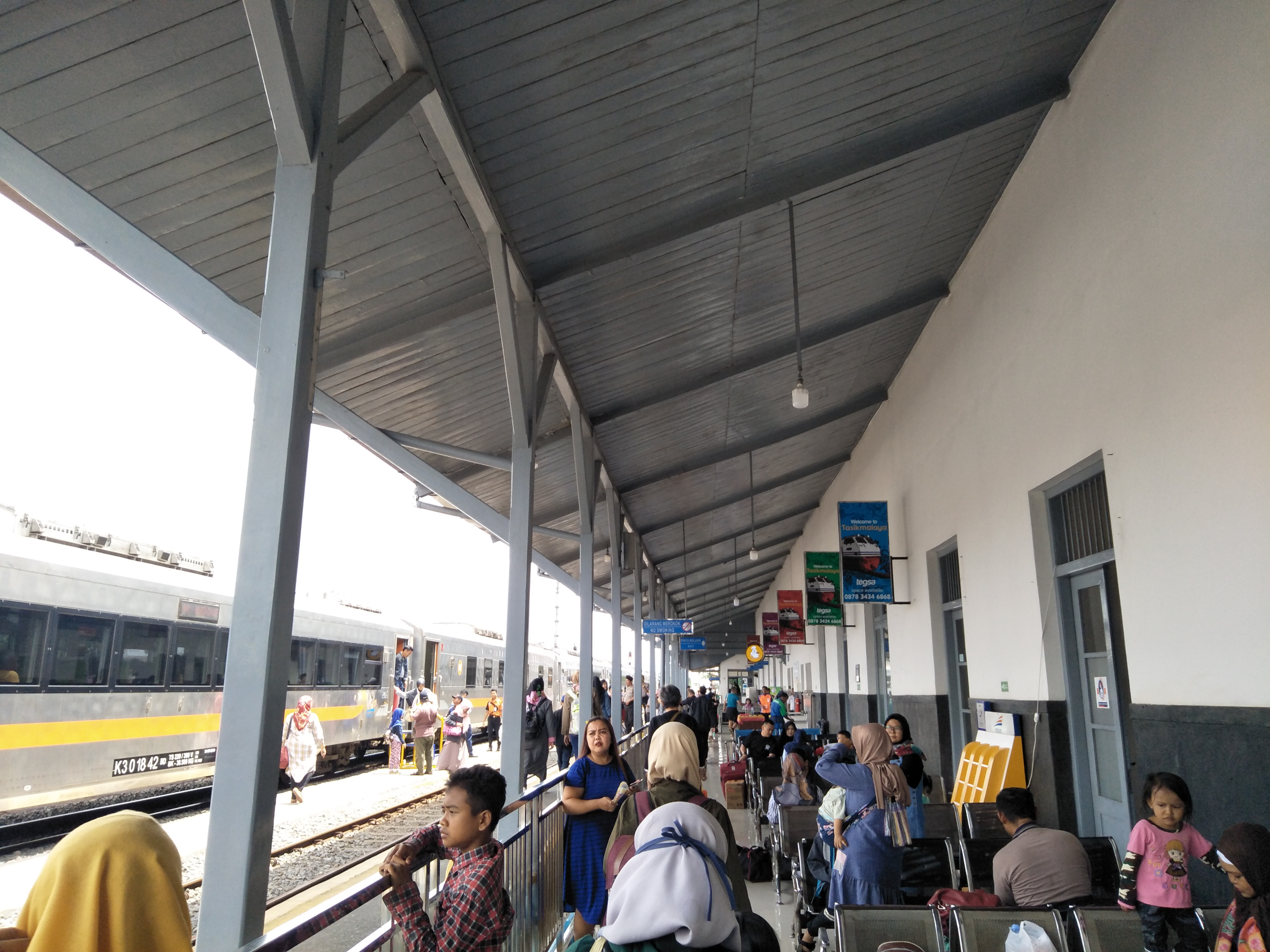
The platform of the station, 2019

Preceding station	Kereta Api Indonesia	Following station
Indihiang towards Padalarang	Padalarang–Kasugihan	Awipari towards Kasugihan
