= Overnight train service (Indonesia) =

Freight and baggage train service in Indonesia

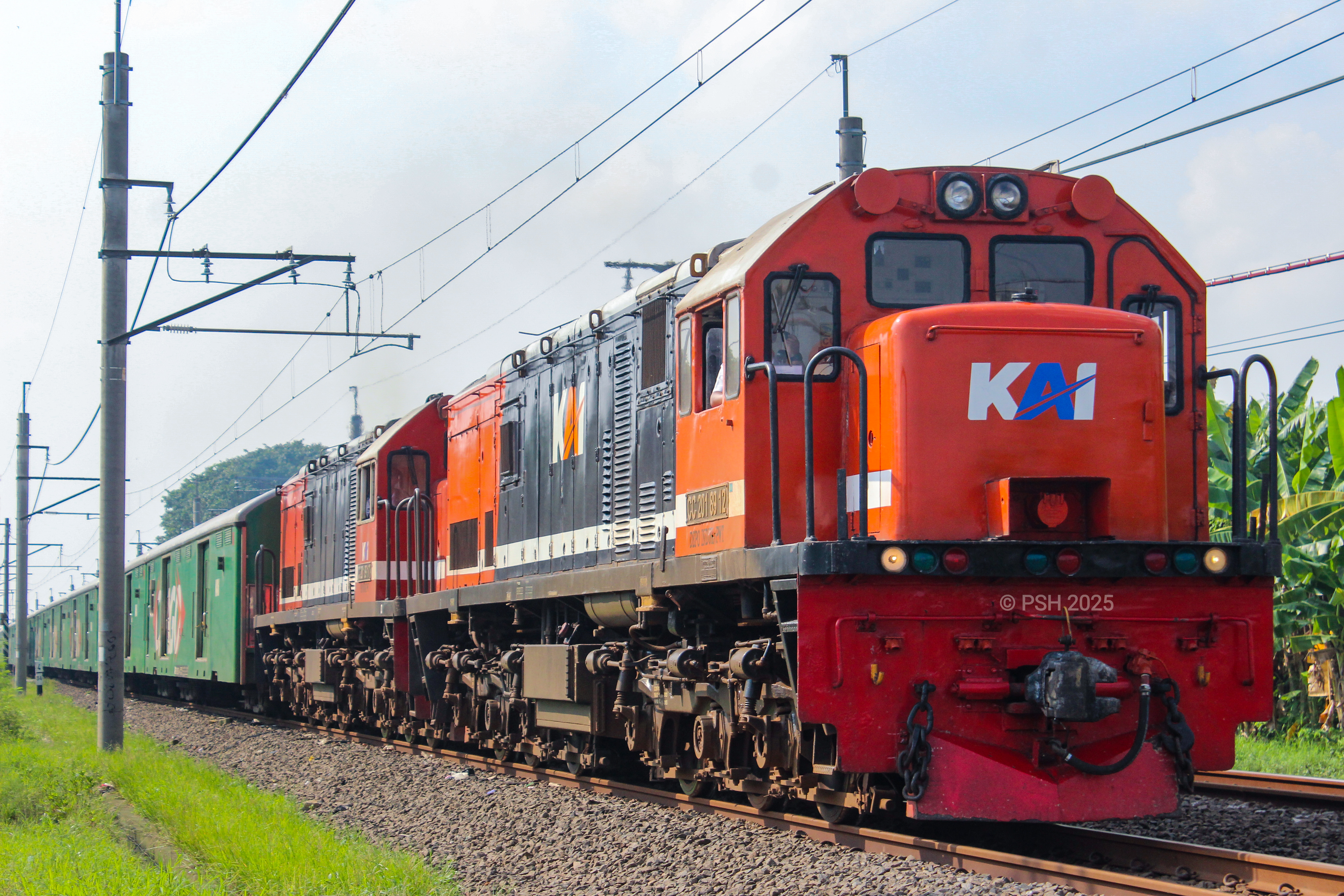
- Northern Parcel ONS with CC201 locomotive Double heading entering the Tambun from Surabaya Pasarturi to Kampung Bandan, Jakarta, 2025

Overview
- Service type: Freight train
- Status: Operational
- Locale: Operational Area I Jakarta (North and Central Parcels); Operational Area VIII Surabaya (Southern Parcel)
- First service: 3 October 2007 (Northern Parcel); 1 December 2019 (Southern Parcel & Central Parcel); 11 March 2020 (Central Parcel)
- Current operators: Kereta Api Indonesia & KAI Logistik
- Website: Official website of KAI Logistik

Route
- Termini: Kampung Bandan (North and Central Parcels); Bandung (South Parcel) * Surabaya Pasarturi (Northern Parcel); Malang (Central Parcel); Surabaya Kota (Southern Parcel)
- Service frequency: daily each way
- Train numbers: 301 - 302 (Central); 303 - 304 (Northern); 305 - 306 (Southern)

Technical
- Rolling stock: CC206; CC203; CC201
- Track gauge: 1067 mm
- Operating speed: 55–100 km/h (34–62 mph)
Route map
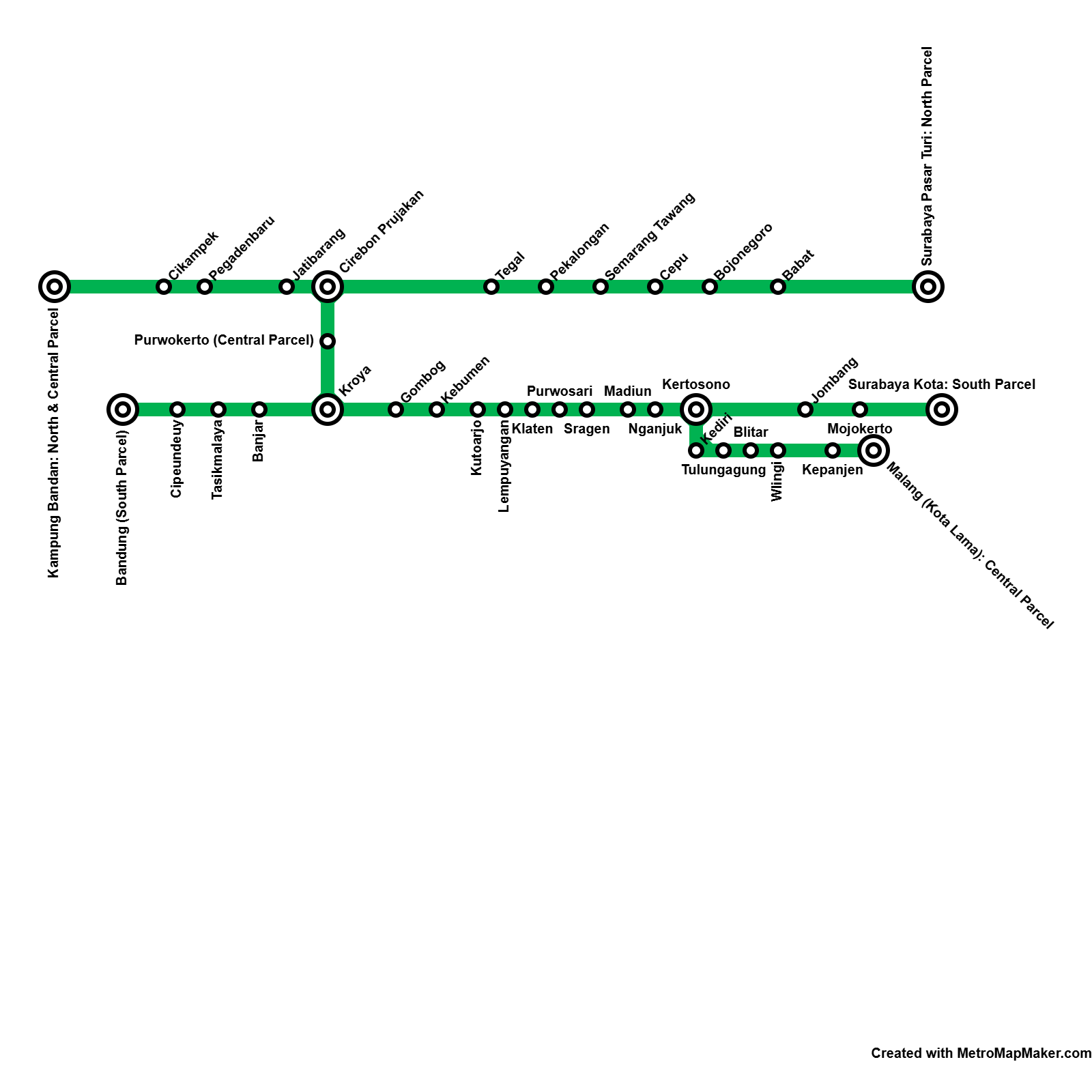

The Overnight train service (also known as Parcel ONS) is a freight and baggage train service that operated by Kereta Api Indonesia & KAI Logistik in Java serving the Bandung–Surabaya Kota and Kampung Bandan–Malang via the southern route of Java, and Kampung Bandan–Surabaya Pasar Turi via the northern route of Java.

The parcel ONS service sets fares according to the type, weight, and distance of the goods.

== Operational ==
The Overnight Services (ONS) train was first operated around Eid al-Fitr on 3 October 2007. Initially, the service was only a Parcel Delivery (BHP) service. BHP transportation is a package transportation service using a luggage cart coupled with a passenger train. BHP transportation continues to operate even though starting around 2009 the Warehouse Block Train System (SKAB) was implemented across Jakarta Gudang–Surabaya Pasarturi via the northern route – then known as Parcel ONS.

Kereta Api Indonesia operates Parcel ONS trains through the southern and central lines since the implementation of the train travel chart (Gapeka) starting 1 December 2019 So some passenger trains—previously carrying freight trains—are no longer coupled to freight trains. There are freight forwarding companies that collaborate with PT. Kereta Api Logistik (Kalog), such as Tiki ONS, JNE, Lion Parcel, &other shipping companies.

On 11 March 2020 PT KAI operates a central line parcel train from Jakarta Storage to Malang.

On 1 January 2024 the South Parcel train from Surabaya Kota to Bandung suspended by KAI until an unspecified date. One year later, the South Parcel Train resumed operations on the same route starting 8 January 2025.

== Free Motorcycle Freight Service (Motis railway) ==
Begin on 11 April 2023, PT KAI, The Ministry of Transportation and DJKA operate free motorized transport trains (Motis) of passenger train type on the northern line (Cilegon-Semarang Tawang), central line (Pasar Senen-Purwosari), southern line (Kiaracondong-Purwosari Station) for the Motis train series (North, Central, South lines) carrying 4 economy cars (K3), 1 power dining car (KMP) plus 3 luggage cars (B).

Started on 2 April 2024, PT KAI, the Ministry of Transportation and DJKA are re-operating the free motorized passenger train (Motis) with the same route Cilegon-Semarang Tawang, but the Motis train for the central and southern routes in 2024 is now very different, namely the Pasar Senen-Kutoarjo (shortened from the Purwosari route) and Pasar Senen-Madiun via Kiaracondong (extended from the Kiaracondong and Purwosari routes) (the previous route in 2023 was Pasar Senen-Purwosari and Kiaracondong-Purwosari).

Started on 20–29 December 2024, PT KAI, the Ministry of Transportation and DJKA are re-operating the free motorized passenger train (Motis) during the 2024 Christmas and 2025 New Year period, namely "MOTIS NATARU" with the route Pasar Senen–Lempuyangan and vice versa; previously the "MOTIS" service operated during the 2023 Christmas and 2024 New Year period, namely the Airlangga Motis.

On 11 to 29 March 2026, Kereta Api Indonesia, Ministry of Transportation, and DJKA are re-operating the free motorized passenger train (Motis) during 2026 Ramadan and Eid al-Fitr for passenger who goes to Homecoming for their families. Jakarta Gudang–Semarang Tawang, but the North Motis train route was extended to Cepu, Blora Regency, Central Java; The Central Motis train continues to serve the Jakarta Gudang–Lempuyangan via the central Java route; while the South Motis train was on hiatus for 1 year (because there was already a Madiun Jaya train on the Pasarsenen–Madiun which operated on 1 February 2025 since the implementation of the enactment of new train travel chart 2025) and returned to operation in 2026 as the Jakarta Gudang – Madiun via the southern Java route (Bandung).

== List of stations ==
On 1 February 2025, the overnight service was schedule only at the over-night based from the enactment of new train travel chart 2025.

Name	Relation	Frequency	Stop at the station
Southern Java railway line
Parcel Selatan (Parsel) (Southern Parcel)	Bandung – Surabaya Kota	1x	Cipeundeuy, Tasikmalaya, Banjar, Kroya, Gombong, Kebumen, Kutoarjo, Lempuyangan, Klaten, Purwosari, Sragen, Madiun, Nganjuk, Kertosono, Jombang, Mojokerto
Parcel Tengah (Parteng) (Central Parcel)	Kampung Bandan – Malang	1x	Cikampek, Pegaden Baru, Jatibarang, Cirebon Prujakan, Purwokerto, Kroya, Gombong, Kebumen, Kutoarjo, Lempuyangan, Klaten, Purwosari, Sragen, Ngawi, Madiun, Nganjuk, Kertosono, Kediri, Tulungagung, Blitar, Wlingi, Kepanjen, Malang Kotalama; Loading and unloading and shunting activities are only carried out at Jakarta Gudang.
Northern Java railway line
Parcel Utara (Parutra) (Northern Parcel)	Kampung Bandan – Surabaya Pasarturi	1x	Cikampek, Pegaden Baru, Jatibarang, Cirebon Prujakan, Tegal, Pekalongan, Semarang Tawang, Cepu, Bojonegoro, Babat; Loading and unloading and shunting activities are only carried out at Jakarta Gudang.

== Train sets ==
The train set for the operation of the ONS Parcel train uses baggage cars (B) made by PT INKA in 2007 to 2009. This baggage car is called the White Arrow with a green color scheme with a white arrow. In addition, it operates using a power-generating baggage car (BP) equipped with a crew room and a smaller power plant than the passenger car. In 2014, some of the used baggage cars were replaced with new ones from PT INKA with a green color scheme with the word "CARGO" written in large letters.

Here's railway formation carrier of the Overnight train service in Indonesia:

Train service	Train abbreviation	Number train	From	Destination	Passing	Railway depot	Formation
North Parcel train	Northern Parcel	303-304	Kampung Bandan	Surabaya Pasarturi	Northern route of Java	Jakarta Gudang (JAKG)	one locomotive, one gerator baggage car, ten baggage cars
Central Parcel train	Middle Parcel	301-302	Kampung Bandan	Malang	Central route of Java	Jakarta Gudang (JAKG)	one locomotive, one gerator baggage car, seven baggage cars
South Parcel train	Southern Parcel	305-306	Surabaya Kota	Bandung	Southern route of Java	Sidotopo (SDT)	one locomotive, one power car, six or seven baggage cars
