= Argo Wilis =

Passenger train service between Bandung and Surabaya, Indonesia

- Argo Wilis Train (10), from Bandung to Surabaya, passing through Lempuyangan Station

Overview
- Service type: Inter-city rail
- Status: Operational
- Locale: Operational Area II Bandung
- First service: 8 November 1998 (Bandung-Surabaya Gubeng); 1 December 2019 (Gambir-Bandung-Surabaya Gubeng); 10 February 2021 (Bandung-Surabaya Gubeng)
- Current operators: Kereta Api Indonesia; Operational Area II Bandung

Route
- Termini: Bandung; Surabaya Gubeng
- Stops: Look below
- Distance travelled: 696 kilometres (432 mi)
- Average journey time: 9 hours and 43 minutes
- Service frequency: 2
- Train number: 9-10

On-board services
- Classes: Executive and Panoramic
- Seating arrangements: 50 seats arranged 2–2 (executive) seats can recline and rotate; 38 seats arranged 2-2 (panoramic) seats can recline and rotate
- Catering facilities: On-board cafe and trolley service

Technical
- Rolling stock: CC206
- Track gauge: 1,067 mm
- Operating speed: 70–120 kilometres per hour (43–75 mph)

Argo Wilis is an executive and panoramic class train operated by PT Kereta Api Indonesia between Surabaya and Bandung in Java, Indonesia. The train covers 696 kilometres (432 mi) in 9 hours and 43 minutes with stoppage at Cipeundeuy, Tasikmalaya, Banjar, Kroya, Kutoarjo, Yogyakarta, Solo Balapan, Madiun, Kertosono, Jombang, and Mojokerto. This train runs in the morning from Bandung to Surabaya Gubeng or vice versa, and arrives at the destination at evening/night. In the journey Bandung to Surabaya, passengers can enjoy the beautiful panorama of the eastern part of Parahyangan mountainous region.

== Etymology ==
The word "Argo" (Javanese for "mountain") is a brand name of superior executive train services by KAI, while the word "Wilis" is taken from Mount Wilis, a 2,169 metres (7,116 ft) high mountain with its highest peak in the Bajulan, Nganjuk Regency, East Java.

== History ==
=== 1998-2018 ===
The train service was inaugurated on 8 November 1998 by the Minister of Transportation, Giri Suseno Hardihardjono at Surabaya Gubeng Station and the Governor of West Java, R. Nana Nuriana at Bandung Station. At first, this train operated using a series of trains made by PT. INKA released in 1998 which is equipped with an NT-60 (K8) bogie and there is one optional trip that operates at night. At the beginning of operation until around 2017, this train was often pulled using the CC203 and CC201 locomotives. At the beginning of its operation, this train also served trips at night with optional status.

Due to low occupancy rate around 2008, this train was once operated as an elective trainset, and there was even talk of abolishing the Argo Wilis train service.

In mid-2016, this train began operating with eight or nine executive class cars alongside a diner as the occupancy rate increased which resulted in the CC206 locomotive being used as a towing locomotive to replace the CC203/CC201 locomotive. Apart from that, priority type executive train services are also added which only run at certain times.

=== 2018-present ===
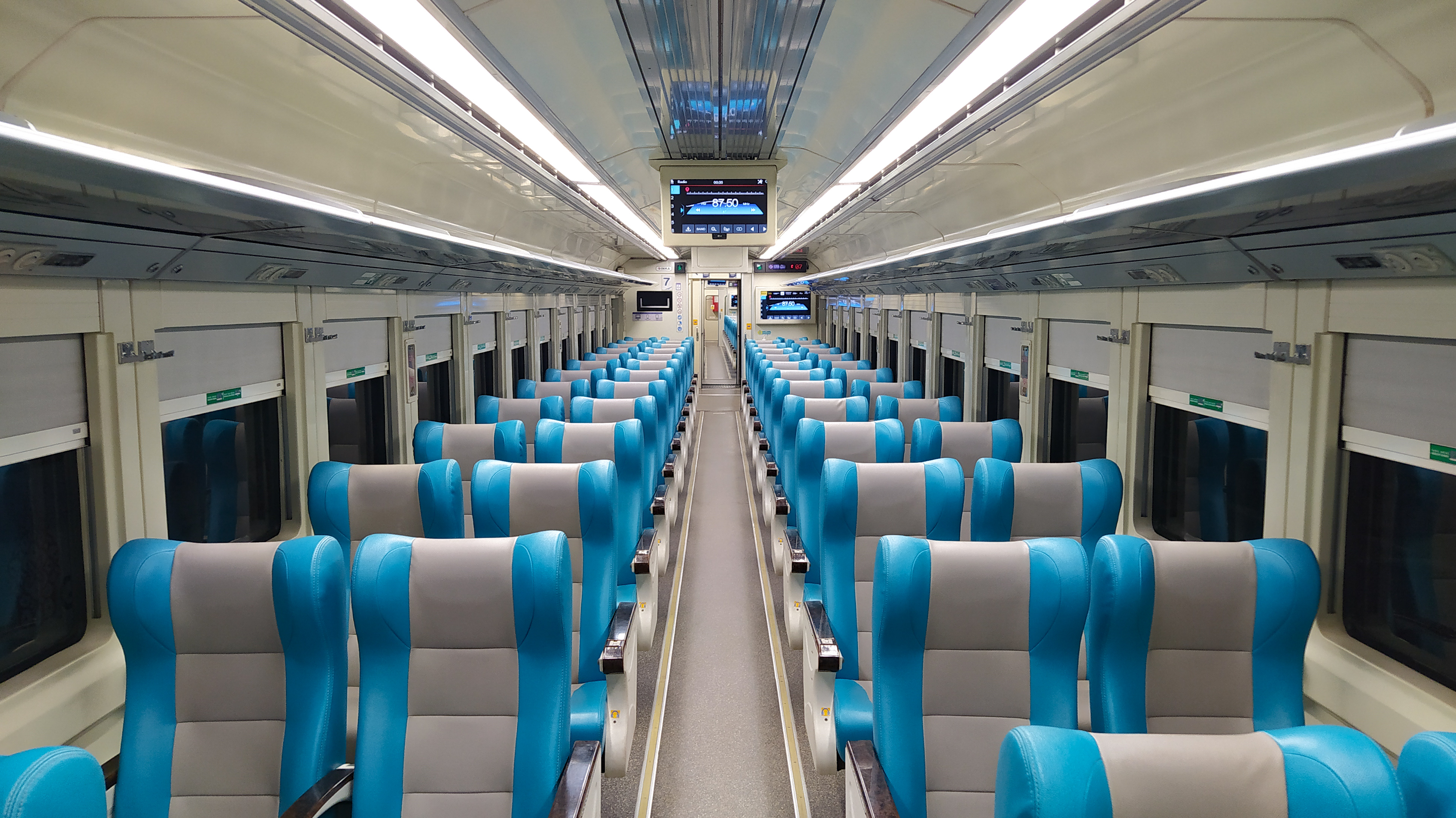
The interior of the stainless steel executive train of Argo Wilis

As of 8 June 2018, the Argo Wilis train operates using a series of stainless steel executive class cars made by PT INKA manufactured for KAI in 2018 and 2019 along with dining and generator cars.

On 1 December 2019 Argo Wilis extended to Jakarta (Gambir station) via Cikampek-Padalarang line, and Argo Wilis added stops station at Jatinegara (only from Surabaya), & Cimahi. However, this train route has been returned to how it was (Bandung–Surabaya Gubeng) since the COVID-19 pandemic and is still valid today.

In September 2021, Argo Wilis shortened travel time and increased speed to 120 km/hour, which also applies to the then Argo Bromo Anggrek, Argo Lawu, Argo Dwipangga, and Taksaka.

As of 1 June 2023, coinciding with the implementation of the 2023 Train Travel Chart (Grafik Perjalanan Kereta Api or Gapeka), the Argo Wilis train added an additional stop at Ciamis Station and will also exchange circuits with the Turangga. In addition, an INKA-built observation panorama car was added.

== Facilities ==
The train consists of 7-9 executive passenger coach - inclusive of an observation panorama car, 1 dining car, and 1 power carriage. The train has capacity for 350-400 passengers.

The train has received the latest series from INKA since its launch in 1998. However, because some of the 1998 series executive cars were also allocated to the Argo Dwipangga, some 1995 series coaches used by the KA Argo Gede were often used especially if the train needs a long consist. As of June 2018, Argo Wilis used trains that varied between Argo executive trains made in 1995, 1996, 1998 and 2002, and other trains, and often exchanged rakes with the Argo Parahyangan. Since 8 June 2018, Argo Wilis has officially used the latest executive trainsets which has a 2018 stainless steel body made by PT INKA Madiun, complete with a new trainset consist and with a generator car added. The train uses CC206 diesel electric locomotives. Previously used locomotives were CC203, CC201, and CC204. This executive class train uses a 2-2 seat formation which can accommodate 50 passengers per car. The seats in this class are made of leather seats that can be reclined and rotated according to the direction of the train.

== List of stations ==
Argo Wilis train route map, accurate since 1 February 2025 (based on 2025 train travel graphics in Java)

Station	Transfer/Notes	Location	
Station	Transfer/Notes	City/Regency	Province
Surabaya Gubeng	Terminal station. Interchange station to commuter rail services. Trans Semanggi Suroboyo: K2L	Surabaya	East Java
Mojokerto	Interchange station to commuter rail services.	Mojokerto	East Java
Jombang	Interchange station to local train services.	Jombang Regency	East Java
Kertosono	Interchange station to local train services.	Nganjuk Regency	East Java
Madiun		Madiun	East Java
Solo Balapan	Yogyakarta Line AS Adisumarmo Airport Rail Link Trans Jateng: 1 Batik Solo Trans: 2 4 6	Surakarta	Central Java
Yogyakarta	Yogyakarta Line Prambanan Express YIA Airport Rail Link Trans Jogja: 1A, 1B, 2A, 3A, 3B	Yogyakarta	Special Region of Yogyakarta
Kutoarjo	Prambanan Express	Purworejo Regency	Central Java
Kroya		Cilacap Regency	Central Java
Banjar		Banjar	West Java
Tasikmalaya		Tasikmalaya	West Java
Cipeundeuy	Used for inspections.	Garut Regency	West Java
Bandung	Terminal station. Interchange station to C Garut and B Greater Bandung commuter rails. Metro Jabar Trans: 2D 3D 4D Trans Metro Bandung: K2 K5F K6F	Bandung	West Java

== Incidents ==
- On 4 February 2013, the Argo Wilis train, pulled by a CC201 locomotive, collided with a Toyota Avanza in Manonjaya, Tasikmalaya, West Java. One person was unharmed, while five people were seriously injured.
- On 20 December 2013, there was damage to the rail at km 393+8//9 between Maos-Sikampuh. A local resident managed to stop the Argo Wilis train, which was speeding so that it could stop before crossing the tracks.
- On 17 October 2023, in Sentolo, Kulon Progo, between Wates and Sentolo stations, the Argo Semeru train derailed. At the same time, from the opposite direction the Argo Wilis train hit the rear carriage of the Argo Semeru, injuring several people.

== Gallery ==
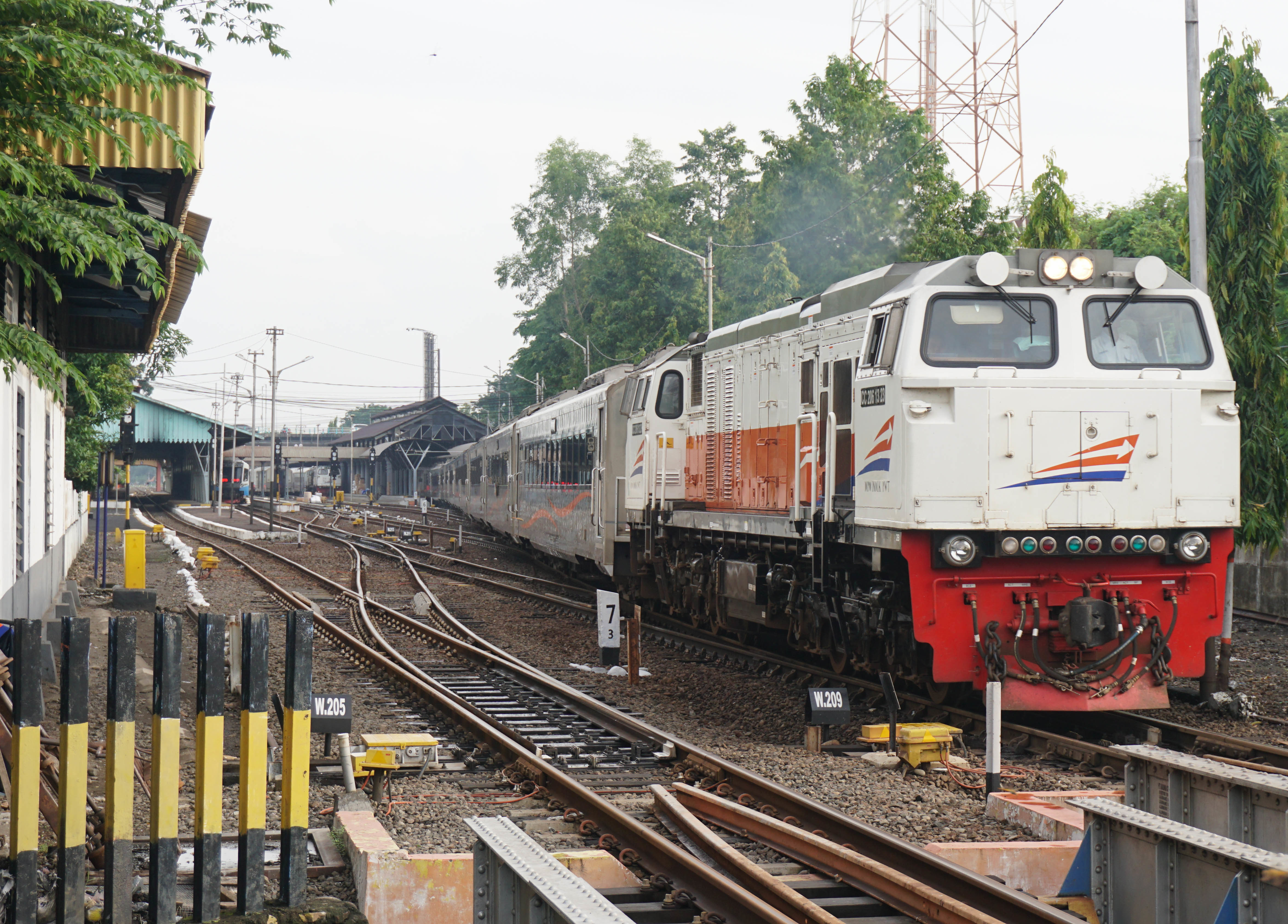
Argo Wilis train departing from Surabaya Gubeng

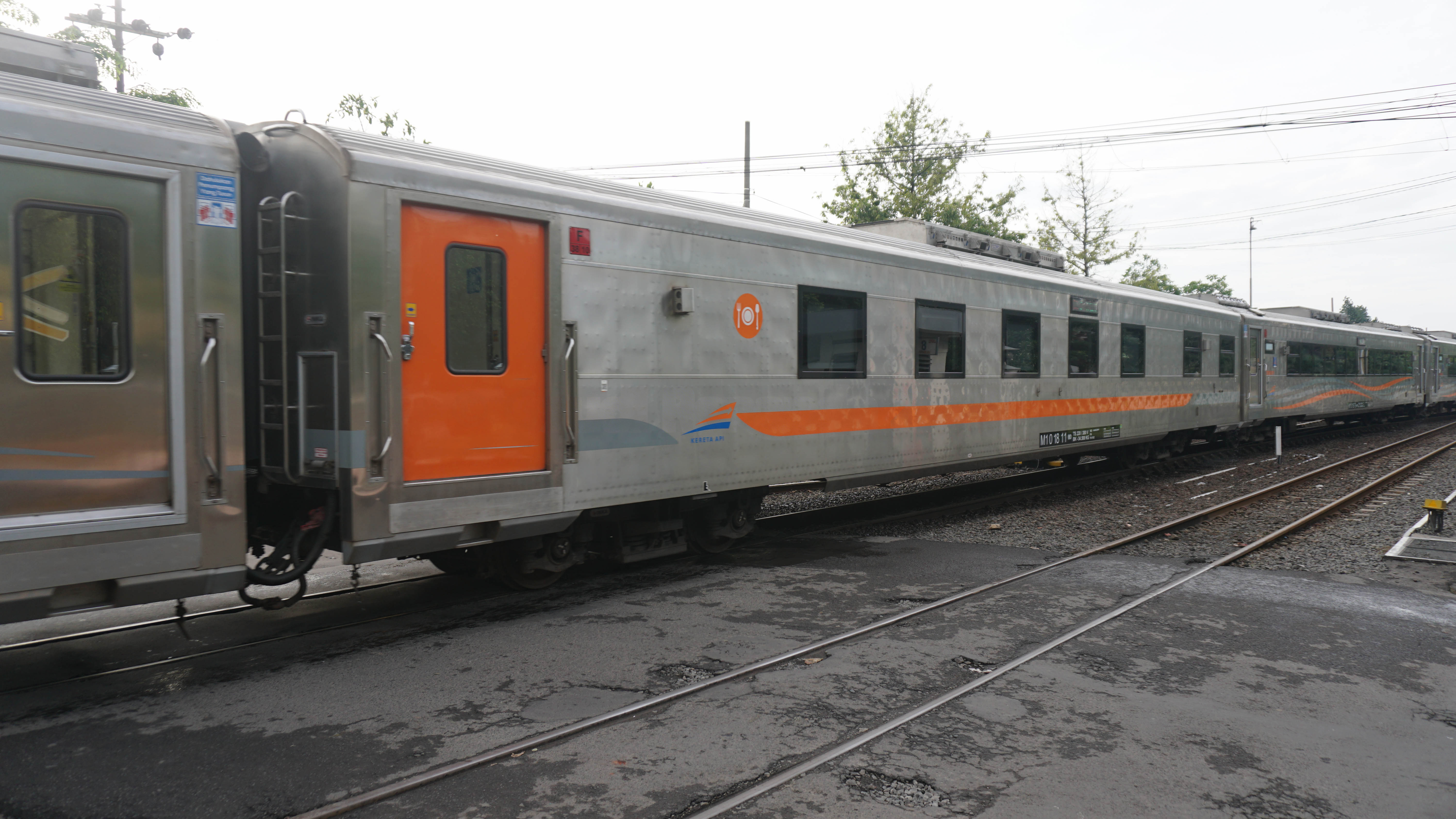
Argo Wilis dining car

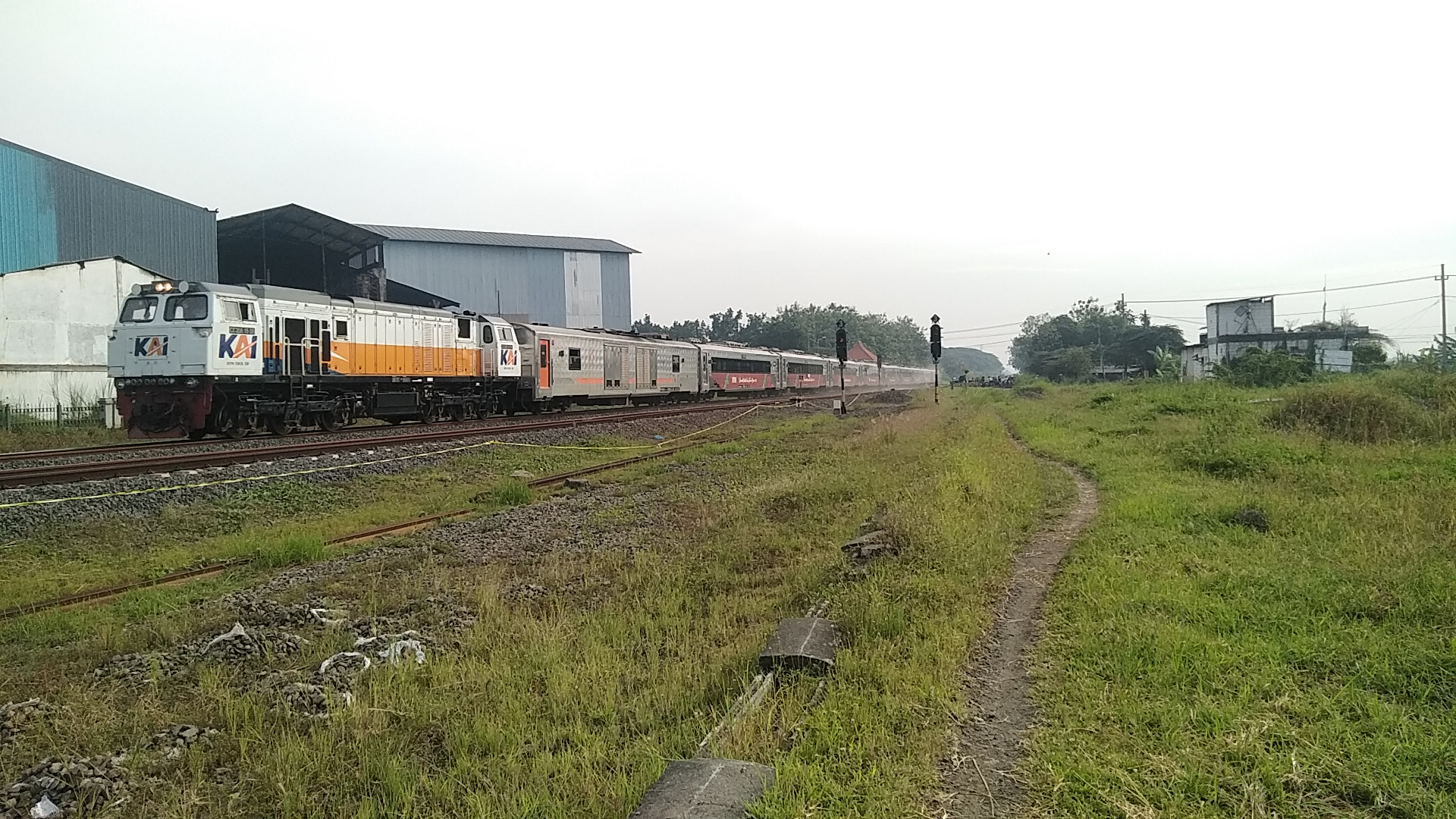
Argo Wilis passing through Boharan Station, 2023

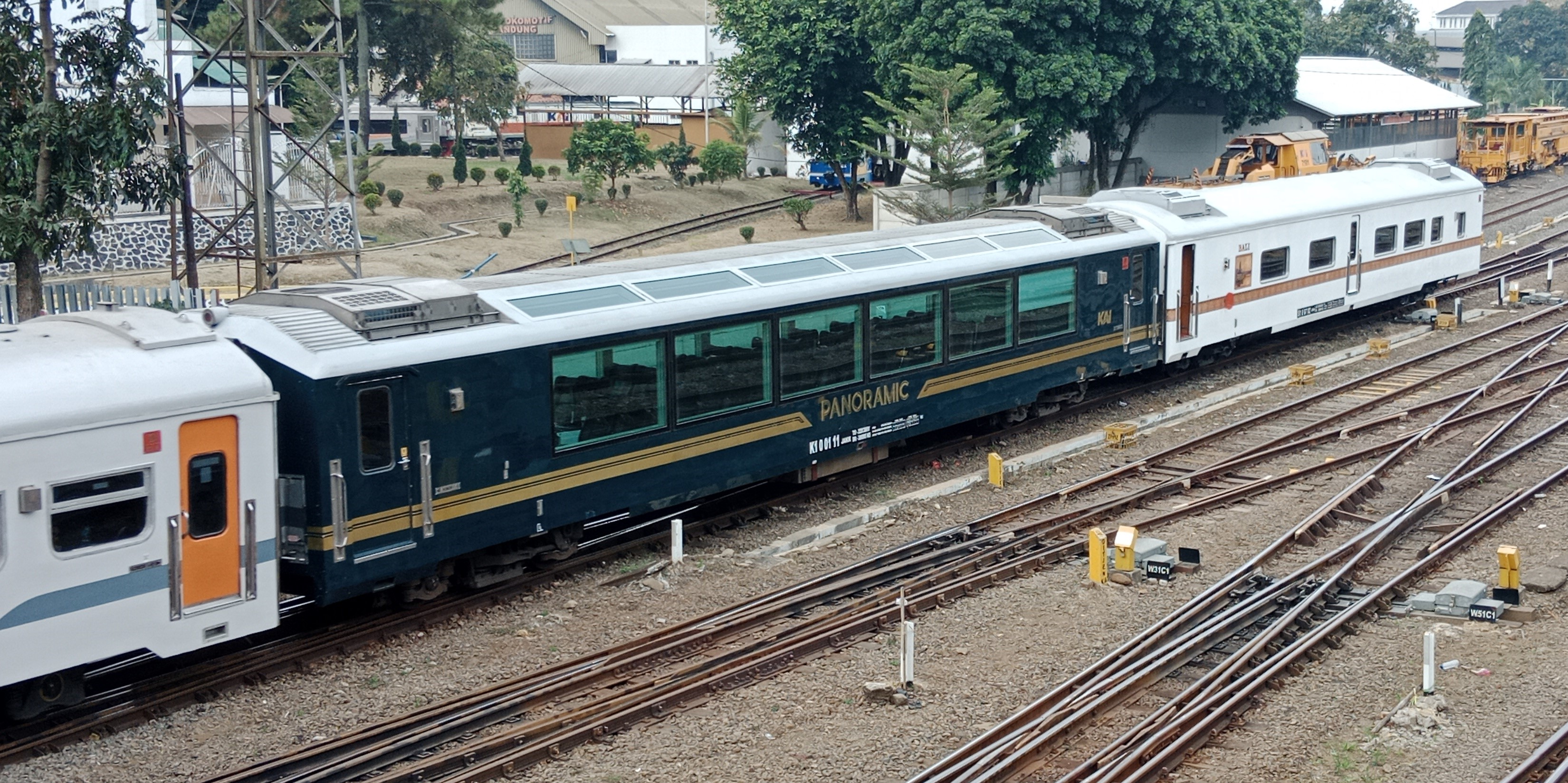
Panoramic coach used by the Argo Wilis and Turangga

== See also ==
- Kereta Api Indonesia
- Rail transport in Indonesia
- List of named passenger trains of Indonesia
- Argo Bromo Anggrek
- Lodaya
- Argo Semeru
- Turangga
- Malabar
