= Lodaya =

Passenger train service between Bandung and Surakarta (Solo), Indonesia

- Lodaya train 78 (morning service) from Bandung with CC206 passing at Maguwo railway station

Overview
- Service type: Inter-city rail
- Status: Operational (regular & addition)
- Locale: Operational Area VI Yogyakarta & Operational Area II Bandung
- Predecessor: Fajar Pajajaran & Senja Mataram (11 March 1992 - 12 May 2000)
- First service: 12 May 2000
- Current operator: Kereta Api Indonesia

Route
- Termini: Bandung; Solo Balapan
- Stops: Look below
- Distance travelled: 447 km (277 mil)
- Average journey time: 8 hours
- Service frequency: 2x daily each way (morning & night)
- Train numbers: 77-80 (regular); 7011-7014 (addition)

On-board services
- Classes: economy & executive
- Seating arrangements: 50 seats arranged 2-2 (executive class); 72 seats arranged 2-2 (economy class)
- Catering facilities: On-board cafe and trolley service
- Observation facilities: The duplex panoramic glass, with blinds, heat insulating laminated layer
- Entertainment facilities: free Wi-Fi, Air conditioning Passenger information system, USB, etc

Technical
- Rolling stock: CC206
- Track gauge: 1.067 mm
- Operating speed: 70–120 kilometres per hour (43–75 mph)
Route map

Lodaya is an intercity passenger train operated by Kereta Api Indonesia (KAI) on the southern route of Java, serving Bandung and Solo Balapan. It offers two daily trips in each direction, morning and night. The distance between both cities is approximately 447 kilometers with a travel time of around eight hours. The service consists of executive and economy class coaches.

Passengers traveling from Bandung toward Solo pass mountain scenery in eastern Parahyangan, including notable crossings such as the Cirahong railway bridge and Citiis railway bridge. Since 2024 Lodaya has used stainless steel new generation trainsets built by Industri Kereta Api (INKA).

== History ==
The name "Lodaya" is taken from macan lodaya, a mythological tiger figure from Sundanese culture. It is described as a strong and agile black panther linked to the Prabu Siliwangi tradition and is a well-known cultural symbol in West Java. KAI adopted the name for the Bandung–Solo service when the Lodaya train was officially introduced on 12 May 2000.

Before adopting the Lodaya name, the route was served by Fajar Pajajaran and Senja Mataram, which began operating on 11 March 1992 between Bandung and Yogyakarta, later extended to Solo Balapan in 1992. When Lodaya replaced these services in 2000, KAI introduced a blue and white livery distinct from other trains. The popularity of the route led to the launch of Lodaya II in 2003 to increase capacity, as reported when KAI reorganized several economic services that year.

Modernization continued in later years. In 2018 Lodaya began operating stainless steel coaches built by Industri Kereta Api (INKA), followed by the adoption of INKA's stainless steel new generation fleet beginning 1 May 2024 for the Solo–Bandung direction, and expanded to both directions from 1 September 2024. Capacity was increased again on 19 September 2025, when KAI added one more economy new generation coach to Lodaya, raising total seat capacity from 416 to 488.

== Train class ==
The Lodaya train has 488 seats across two classes: Economy and Executive Class, with four railway coaches for Economy Class and four railway coaches for Executive Class. There is also with one dining car and one power car from New Generation Stainless steel.

== Stations ==
Based on published operational information, Lodaya serves the following major stations:

- Bandung (start/end)
- Kiaracondong
- Cibatu
- Cipeundeuy
- Tasikmalaya
- Ciamis
- Banjar
- Sidareja
- Gandrungmangun
- Kroya
- Kebumen
- Kutoarjo
- Wates
- Yogyakarta
- Klaten
- Solo Balapan (start/end)

== Accidents and incidents ==
- On 10 October 2013, the Lodaya train hit a rock that was stuck in the middle of the rail at km 440+0/1 in Karanganyar, Kebumen, which caused the train to make an extraordinary stop (BLB) at Gombong station.
- On 5 October 2015 at 01.45, the Lodaya train derailed at km 244+5/6, precisely in the Kampung Terung area, Mekarsari, Kadipaten, Tasikmalaya, which caused the Pasundan and Turangga train to experience a delay from the normal schedule.
- On 18 April 2017, the Lodaya (79) was Collision with Minibus in Pasar Sigong Level Crossing, Kroya, Cilacap, Central Java. That causing 5 people into the minibus dead & 2 people injured, also causing some train service are delayed.
- On 22 March 2018, one Lodaya train carriage derailed in-between Bumiwaluya and Warungbandrek station, Garut Regency, causing 322 passengers must be transferred to bus, and causing 5 trains were delayed include the Argo Wilis and Malabar.
- On 29 May 2019 at 16.30, the Lodaya addition train (KA 7019) derailed at km 193-192 of the Lebakjero-Nagreg section because the train track body had collapsed.
- On 27 April 2022, the Lodaya Collision with the Truck on the level crossing between Patukan and Rewulu station in Yogyakarta, causing 6 the train night service are delayed include the Taksaka.
- On 4 November 2025, the 77 Lodaya and 161 Bangunkarta train were accident in the Brambanan-Maguwo section, the Lodaya train hitting the one of the pedestrian in the level crossing no gates at 07.55 local time, while the Bangunkarta train collision with motorcycle and car in the level crossing with the gates at 10.35 local time that killing 3 drivers. As a result, 4 people were dead the crashes by the Lodaya and Bangunkarta train in different location.

== Facilities ==
On beginning the Lodaya train on 12 May 2000, Lodaya use an Business class & Executive class train until 2018, because INKA upgrading the car of the Lodaya with Stainless Steel Gen.1 an Premium Economy & Executive class, as an impact use of the Stainless Steel car, speed limit of the Lodaya upgraded from 50 km/h (31 mph) - 90 km/h (55 mph) or 100 km/h (62 mph) become to 70 km/h (43 mph) - 120 km/h (75 mph) in 2018.

On 1 May 2024 at night, the Lodaya train 93 use Stainless Steel Gen.2 (also known as New Generation) from Solo Balapan to Bandung night service, on 2 May 2024 the Lodaya train 92 use the same train sets (Stainless Steel Gen.2 New Generation) from Bandung to Solo Balapan morning service. On 1 September 2024, the Lodaya train 91 and 94 use Stainless Steel Gen.2 (New Generation), the Lodaya train officially became as the first train use Stainless Steel New Generation in Southern Java railway line include Bandung.

== Gallery ==
Lodaya train logo between 2000 and 2007

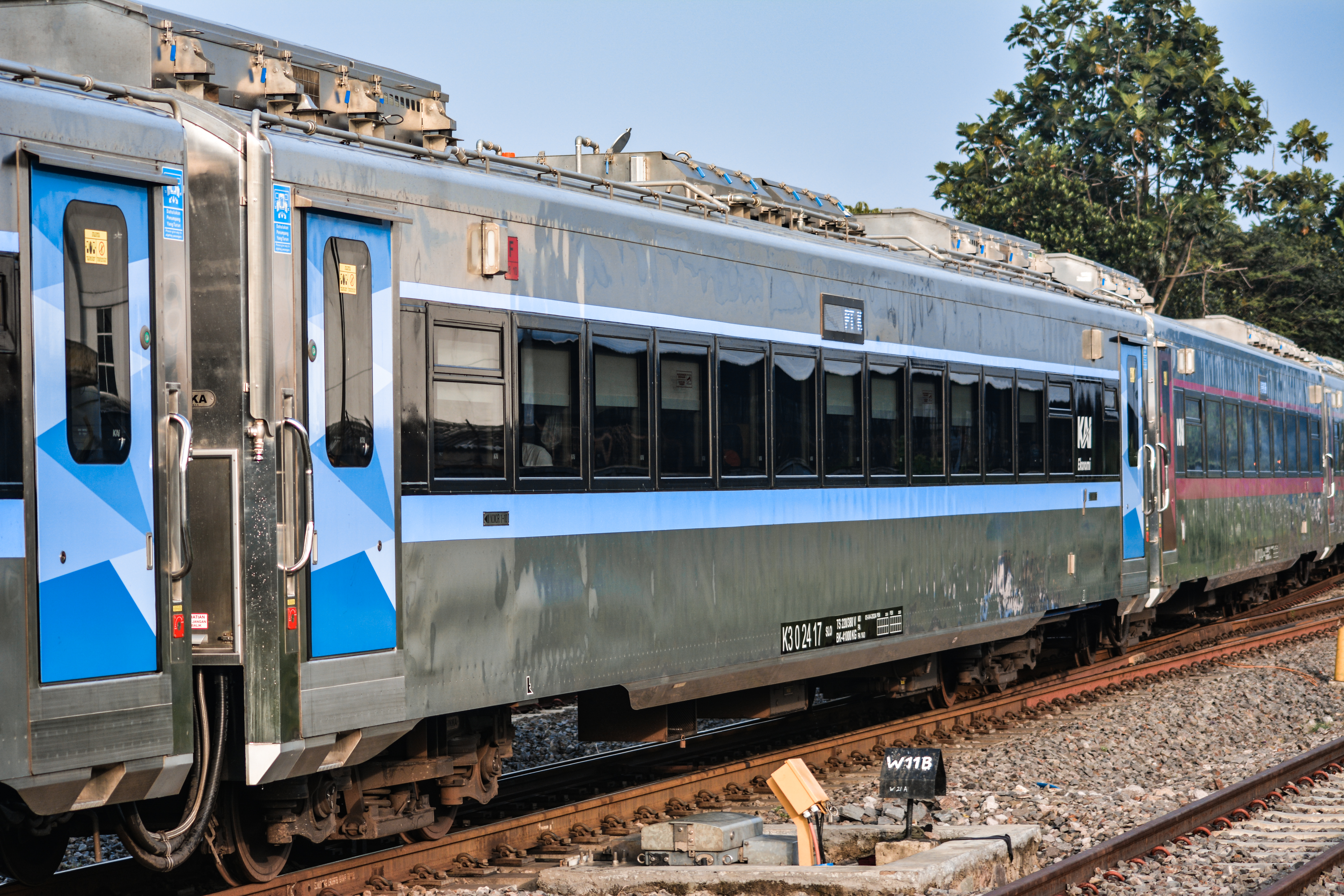
Economy New Generation Stainless Steel used by the Lodaya train since 2024

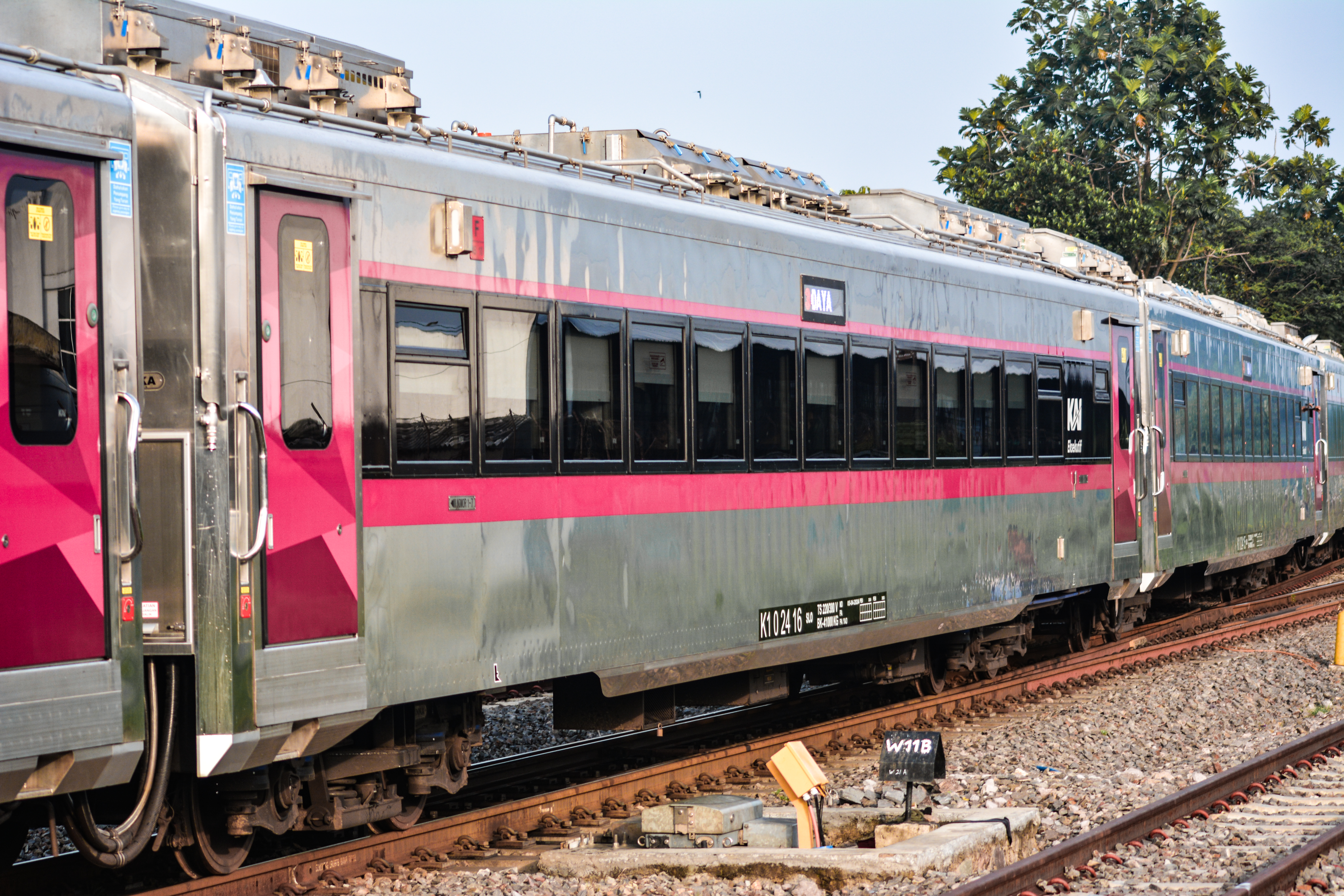
Executive New Generation Stainless Steel (Whoosh livery color) used by the Lodaya train since 2024

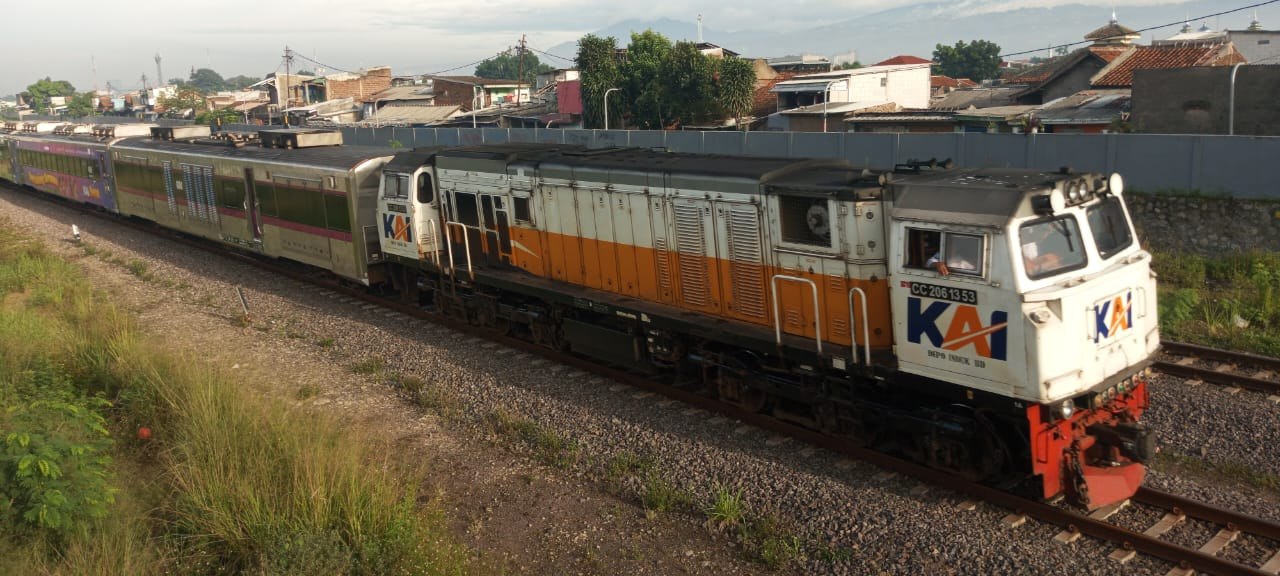
Lodaya train left from Kiaracondong with 1 executive train set Jumbo 2025 movie livery, November 2025

== See also ==
- Argo Wilis
- Rail transport in Indonesia
- List of named passenger trains of Indonesia
- Taksaka
- Turangga
- Harina
- Lodaya (tiger)
- Malabar
- Sancaka
- Kereta Api Indonesia
