= Malabar (train) =

Passenger train service between Bandung and Malang, Indonesia since 2010

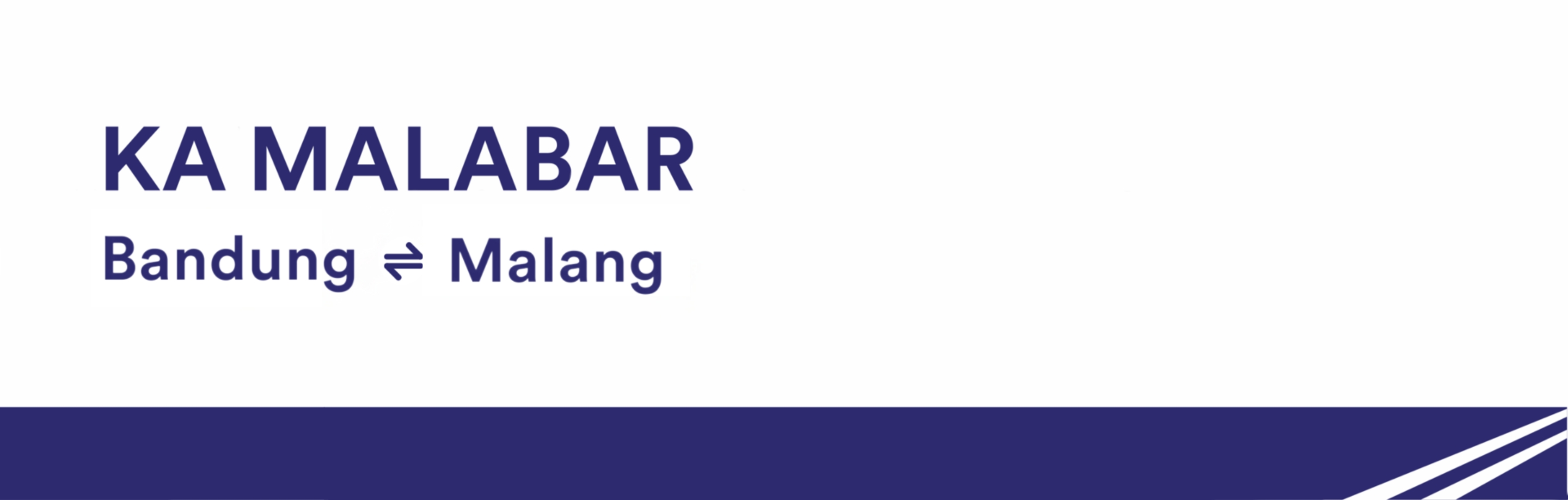

- Malabar train departured from Yogyakarta Station to Bandung Station in day.

Overview
- Service type: Inter-city rail
- Status: Operating
- Locale: West Java and East Java, Indonesia
- First service: 30 April 2010; 16 years ago (night trip); 24 January 2024; 2 years ago (morning trip)
- Current operator: KAI Operational Area II Bandung

Route
- Termini: Bandung; Malang
- Distance travelled: 772 km (480 mi)
- Service frequency: Once in a day for each schedule
- Train numbers: 67-68 (night); 67-70 (morning) (start from 1 February)

On-board services
- Classes: Executive and Premium economy
- Seating arrangements: 2-2
- Catering facilities: On-board café
- Entertainment facilities: yes
- Baggage facilities: Overhead racks, baggage carriage
- Other facilities: Reading lamp, toilet, fire extinguisher, emergency brake, air conditioner, soundproofing, and audio jack hole.

Technical
- Track gauge: 1,067 mm (3 ft 6 in)
- Operating speed: 55–120 km/h

Malabar is a train that serves the Malang–Bandung route with executive and premium economy classes. The name Malabar itself comes from a mountain located in Bandung Regency.

== History ==
=== Early period ===
The Malabar train first operated on 30 April 2010 and served passengers from Bandung to Malang and vice versa. At that time, this train served executive, business, and economy classes which were arranged in one train.

=== Extension to Jakarta ===
This train had its route extended to Pasar Senen on 1 December 2019, but almost a year later the route of this train was returned to its original state.

=== Recent period ===
Since 1 June 2023, the business class has officially been removed from this train leaving two classes namely executive and economy, as well as the addition of a baggage carriage from the original one carriage to two baggage carriages. The morning schedule for this train was officially launched on 24 January 2024 from Bandung to Malang and a day later in the opposite direction. Initially, this schedule used train sets made of stainless steel, but since 13 May 2024 these trains have used mild steel trains which were previously used for the Lodaya.

== Route ==
=== Current ===
Malabar train route map, accurate since 1 February 2025 (based on 2025 train travel graphics in Java)

| Station name | Distance from (km) | | Location | |
| Station name | Previous station | Bandung Termini | Regency/Cities | Province |
|---|---|---|---|---|
| Bandung | — | | Bandung | West Java |
| Kiaracondong | 4.990 | | Bandung | West Java |
| Leles^{2} | 42.836 | 47.826 | Garut | West Java |
| Cipeundeuy | 31.578 | 74.414 | Garut | West Java |
| Tasikmalaya | 35.655 | 110.069 | Tasikmalaya | West Java |
| Ciamis^{2} | 18.503 | 128.572 | Ciamis | West Java |
| Banjar | 22.273 | 150.845 | Banjar | West Java |
| Sidareja^{7} | 35.676 | 186.521 | Cilacap | Central Java |
| Gandrungmangun^{5} | 7.396 | 193.917 | Cilacap | Central Java |
| Maos | 36.031 | 229.948 | Cilacap | Central Java |
| Kroya | 12.698 | 242.646 | Cilacap | Central Java |
| Gombong^{2} | 28.489 | 271.135 | Kebumen | Central Java |
| Kebumen | 19.467 | 290.602 | Kebumen | Central Java |
| Kutoarjo | 28.113 | 318.715 | Purworejo | Central Java |
| Yogyakarta | 63.649 | 382.364 | Yogyakarta | Special Region of Yogyakarta |
| Klaten^{8} | 28.558 | 410.922 | Klaten | Central Java |
| Solo Balapan | 30.579 | 441.501 | Surakarta | Central Java |
| Ngawi | 68.927 | 510.428 | Ngawi | East Java |
| Madiun | 25.924 | 536.352 | Madiun | East Java |
| Nganjuk | 46.941 | 583.293 | Nganjuk | East Java |
| Kertosono | 21.954 | 605.247 | Nganjuk | East Java |
| Kediri | 28.613 | 633.860 | Kediri | East Java |
| Tulungagung | 30.046 | 663.906 | Tulungagung | East Java |
| Blitar | 33.925 | 697.831 | Blitar | East Java |
| Wlingi^{2} | 19.226 | 717.057 | Blitar Regency | East Java |
| Sumberpucung^{6} | 24.222 | 741.279 | Malang Regency | East Java |
| Kepanjen | 11.345 | 752.624 | Malang Regency | East Java |
| Malang Kotalama | 16.732 | 769.356 | Malang | East Java |
| Malang^{1} | 2.136 | 771.492 | Malang | East Java |

Notes:

^1 Termini.
^2 Night schedule only.
^3 Morning schedule only.
^4 Night schedule to Malang only.
^5 Morning schedule to Malang only.
^6 Morning schedule to Bandung only.
^7 Except morning schedule to Bandung.
^8 Except night schedule to Bandung.

=== Planned ===
Starting from 1 February, Malabar train will be stop at station below.

| Station name | Location | | Note |
| Station name | Regency/Cities | Province | Note |
|---|---|---|---|
| Kawunganten | Cilacap | Central Java | Morning schedule to Malang only. |
| Jeruklegi | Cilacap | Central Java | Morning schedule to Malang only. |
| Ngebruk | Malang Regency | East Java | Morning schedule to Bandung only. |

== Incident ==
- On 4 April 2014, the Malabar Train overturned in Tasikmalaya, precisely around Cirahayu and Ciawi, resulting in five deaths. The cause was a landslide that caused some of the passenger carriages to fall into a ravine.
- On 2 January 2016, there was a fire that hit two passenger trains from Malabar that were parked in Bandung, precisely in the locomotive workshop of the station. There were no fatalities in the incident.
- On 29 October 2016, the Malabar train crashed into a truck carrying a backhoe in Karanganyar, precisely around the inactive Grompol Station. There were no fatalities in this incident, but the locomotive received major maintenance and caused delays for several trains crossing the line between Yogyakarta and Solo Balapan.
- On 2 February 2019, the powertrain dining car coupled to the Malabar train derailed around Bojong and Karangpucung. Although this incident did not cause any fatalities, it resulted in the Mutiara Selatan and Serayu trains being held up in Ciamis.
