= Kahuripan (train) =

Economy class train in Indonesia

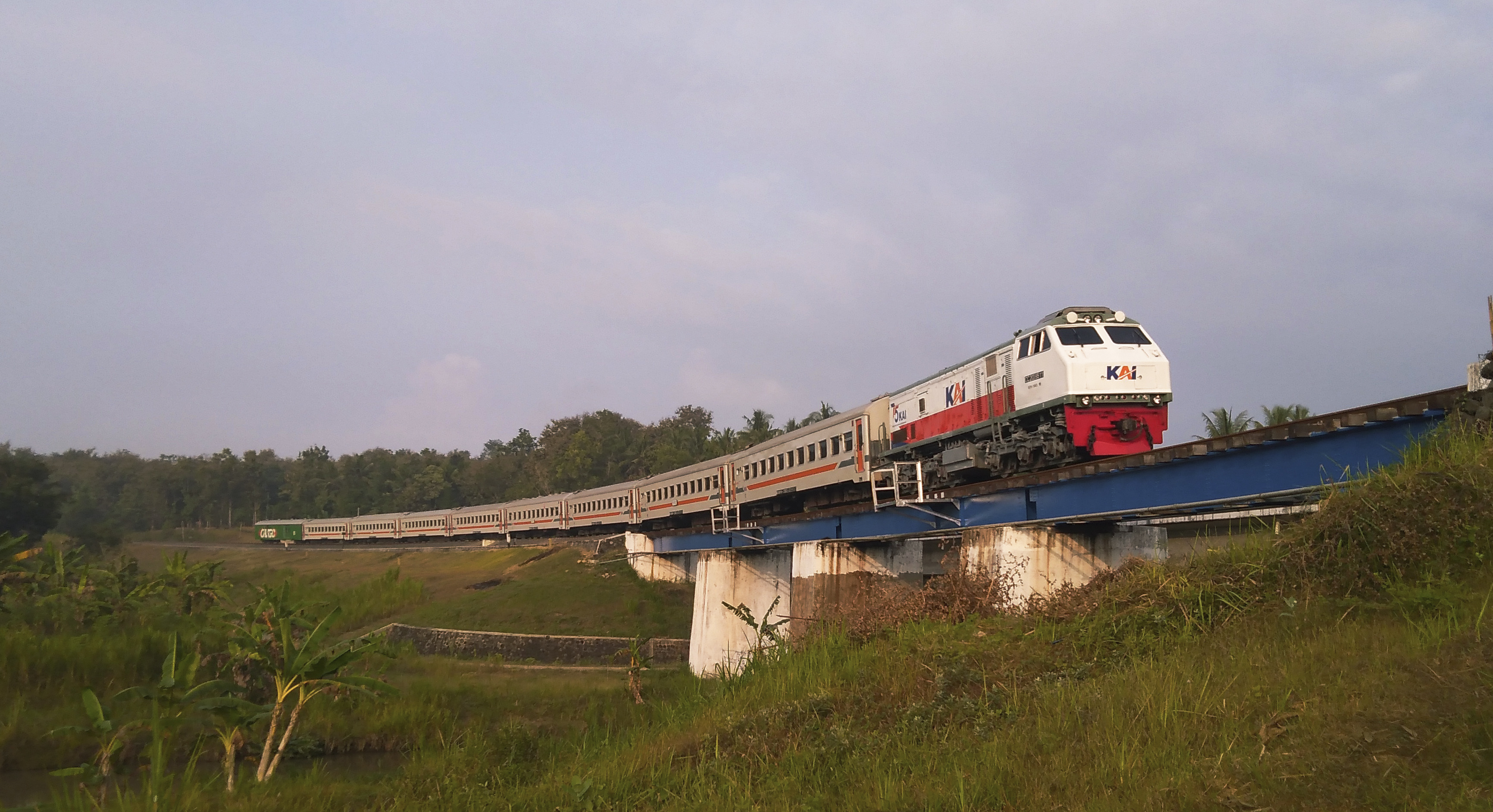
- Kahuripan train (to Blitar) passing Gembongan Bridge in Kulon Progo

Overview
- Service type: Inter-city rail
- Status: Operating
- Locale: West Java and East Java, Indonesia
- First service: 26 July 1995; 31 years ago
- Current operator: KAI Operational Area II Bandung

Route
- Termini: Kiaracondong; Blitar
- Distance travelled: 700 km (430 mi)
- Service frequency: Daily each way
- Train numbers: 237-238; 273-274 (from 1 February)

On-board services
- Class: Economy class
- Seating arrangements: 3-2
- Catering facilities: On-board café
- Baggage facilities: Overhead racks
- Other facilities: Light fire extinguisher, emergency brake, air conditioner and toilet

Technical
- Track gauge: 1,067 mm (3 ft 6 in)
- Operating speed: 50–90 km/h

Kahuripan is an economy class train that serves the Kiaracondong-Blitar route via the southern railway lines of Java Island.

The train's name comes from the Hindu-Buddhist Kahuripan kingdom established in East Java in 1009. The kingdom was founded by Airlangga as a continuation of the Medang Kingdom, which collapsed three years earlier.

== Operation ==
This train first operated on the Kediri-Pasar Senen route via Kiaracondong, before changing its terminus station to Padalarang. Since 2013, the route has been cut again to Kiaracondong—although four years later, it was extended to Blitar.

=== Changes in operational pattern ===
The train changed operators on 1 December 2019, from Operational Area VII Madiun to Operational Area II Bandung, to exchange train sets with the Pasundan train. This meant the train sets were transferred to the Bandung Train Depot.

=== Recent period ===
Based on the latest schedule, the train has added a stop at Leles from both the Blitar and Kiaracondong directions since 1 June 2023.

== Route ==
Note: Termini stations are marked in bold and based on the latest train schedule since 1 February 2025.

Station name	Distance from (km)		Location	
Station name	Previous station	Kiaracondong	Regency/Cities	Province
**Kiaracondong**	—		Bandung	West Java
Leles	42.836		Garut	West Java
Cipeundeuy	31.578	74.414	Garut	West Java
Tasikmalaya	35.655	110.069	Tasikmalaya	West Java
Ciamis	18.503	128.572	Ciamis	West Java
Banjar	22.273	150.845	Banjar	West Java
Sidareja	35.676	186.521	Cilacap	Central Java
Gandrungmangun	7.396	193.917	Cilacap	Central Java
Maos	36.031	229.948	Cilacap	Central Java
Kroya	12.698	242.646	Cilacap	Central Java
Gombong^{↓}	28.489	271.135	Kebumen	Central Java
Karanganyar^{↑}	7.689	278.824	Kebumen	Central Java
Kebumen	11.778	290.602	Kebumen	Central Java
Kutoarjo	28.113	318.715	Purworejo	Central Java
Wates	35.643	354.358	Kulon Progo	Special Region of Yogyakarta
Lempuyangan	29.283	383.641	Yogyakarta	Special Region of Yogyakarta
Klaten	27.281	410.922	Klaten	Central Java
Purwosari	27.743	438.665	Surakarta	Central Java
Sragen	31.795	470.460	Sragen	Central Java
Walikukun	23.564	494.024	Ngawi	East Java
Ngawi	18.490	512.514	Ngawi	East Java
Magetan	15.375	527.889	Magetan	East Java
Madiun	10.549	538.438	Madiun	East Java
Caruban	16.214	554.652	Madiun Regency	East Java
Nganjuk	30.727	585.379	Nganjuk	East Java
Kertosono	21.954	607.333	Nganjuk	East Java
Papar	13.142	620.475	Kediri Regency	East Java
Kediri	15.471	635.946	Kediri	East Java
Tulungagung	30.046	665.992	Tulungagung	East Java
**Blitar**	33.925	699.917	Blitar	East Java

^{↓}	One way to Blitar
^{↑}	One way to Kiaracondong

== Incidents ==
- On 25 October 1995, the Kahuripan train coupled with the Galuh train (now Serayu) derailed around Cirahayu. This incident resulted in many trains falling into a ravine and two locomotives being severely damaged and requiring extensive maintenance. The majority of the dead and injured were from the carriages that fell into the ravine.
- On 5 December 2001, the Kahuripan train crashed into a freight train loaded with cement and fertilizer that was shunting in Palur Station. This incident was caused by the Kahuripan train violating the signal to enter the station. There were no fatalities, but one passenger suffered minor injuries.
- On 13 September 2022, a truck loaded with fertilizer was hit by a Kahuripan train near Kawunganten Station. The truck was supposed to deliver fertilizer to Klaten, but the driver did not realize there was a train passing by so the collision occurred. There were no fatalities, but the truck was damaged and the victim suffered minor head injuries.
- On 1 October 2023, a resident died after being hit by a Kahuripan train passing from Kiaracondong toward Blitar. The location of the incident was between Solo Jebres and Palur. At the time of the incident, he did not know there was a train passing at high speed.
