= Banjar railway station =

Railway station in Indonesia

Banjar Station Stasiun Banjar
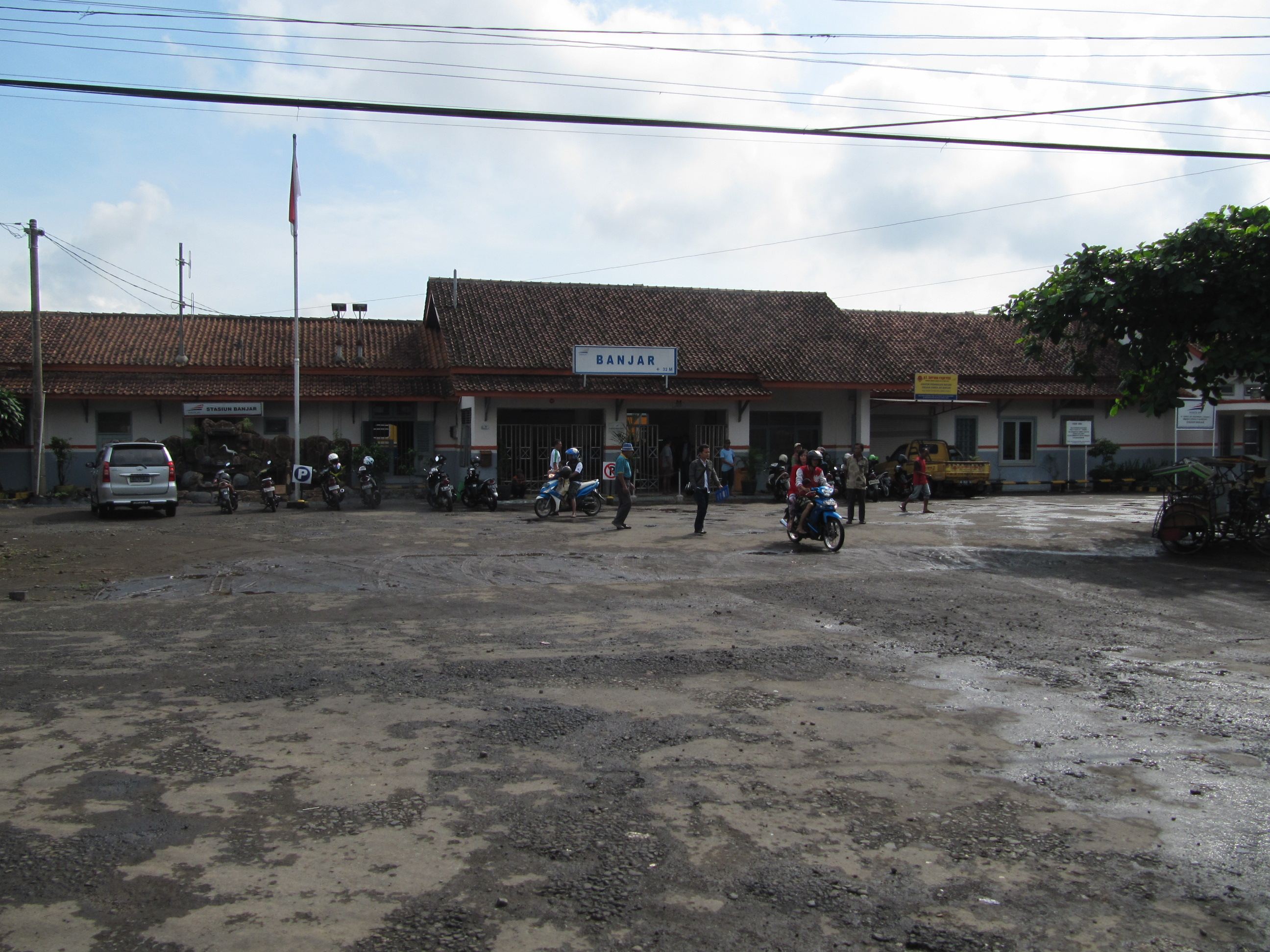
- Front view

General information
- Location: Jl. Letjen Suwarto, Hegarsari, Pataruman, Banjar; West Java; Indonesia
- Coordinates: 7.376294°S 108.542293°E
- Elevation: +32 m (105 ft)
- Owner: Kereta Api Indonesia
- Operator: Kereta Api Indonesia; Kereta Api Logistik
- Lines: Padalarang–Kasugihan; ~~Banjar–Cijulang~~
- Platforms: 1 side platform 2 island platforms
- Tracks: 6

Construction
- Structure type: Ground
- Parking: Available
- Accessible: Available

Other information
- Station code: BJR
- Classification: Large class

History
- Opened: 1 November 1894
Location
- Location within Java

Banjar Station (BJR) is a railway station located in Hegarsari, Pataruman, Banjar, West Java, Indonesia. The station has six railway tracks.

== Services ==
The following is a list of train services at the Banjar Station.

=== Passenger services ===
- Executive class
  - Argo Wilis, Destination of Bandung and Surabaya Gubeng
  - Turangga, Destination of Bandung and Surabaya Gubeng
- Mixed class
  - Mutiara Selatan, Destination of Bandung and Surabaya Gubeng
  - Malabar, Destination of Bandung and Malang
  - Lodaya, Destination of Bandung and Solo Balapan
  - Pangandaran, Destination of Gambir (Planned destination of Gambir and Pangandaran)
  - Baturraden Express, Destination of Bandung and Purwokerto
  - Sangkuriang train, Destination of Bandung and Ketapang
- Economy class
  - Kahuripan, Destination of Kiaracondong and Blitar
  - Pasundan, Destination of Kiaracondong and Surabaya Gubeng
  - Kutojaya Selatan, Destination of Kiaracondong and Kutoarjo
  - Serayu, Destination of Pasar Senen and Purwokerto

=== Freight ===
- Over Night Services, Destination of Bandung and Surabaya Kota

The station was once the junction where the scenic railway line to Pangandaran beach originated. Despite its popularity among tourists, the line was closed in 1982 as the cost far outweighed its revenues. Since then there has been on and off effort to reactivate the line.

Preceding station	Kereta Api Indonesia	Following station
Karangpucung towards Padalarang	Padalarang–Kasugihan	Langensari towards Kasugihan
Terminus	~~Banjar–Cijulang~~	Batulawang towards Cijulang
