= Serayu (train) =

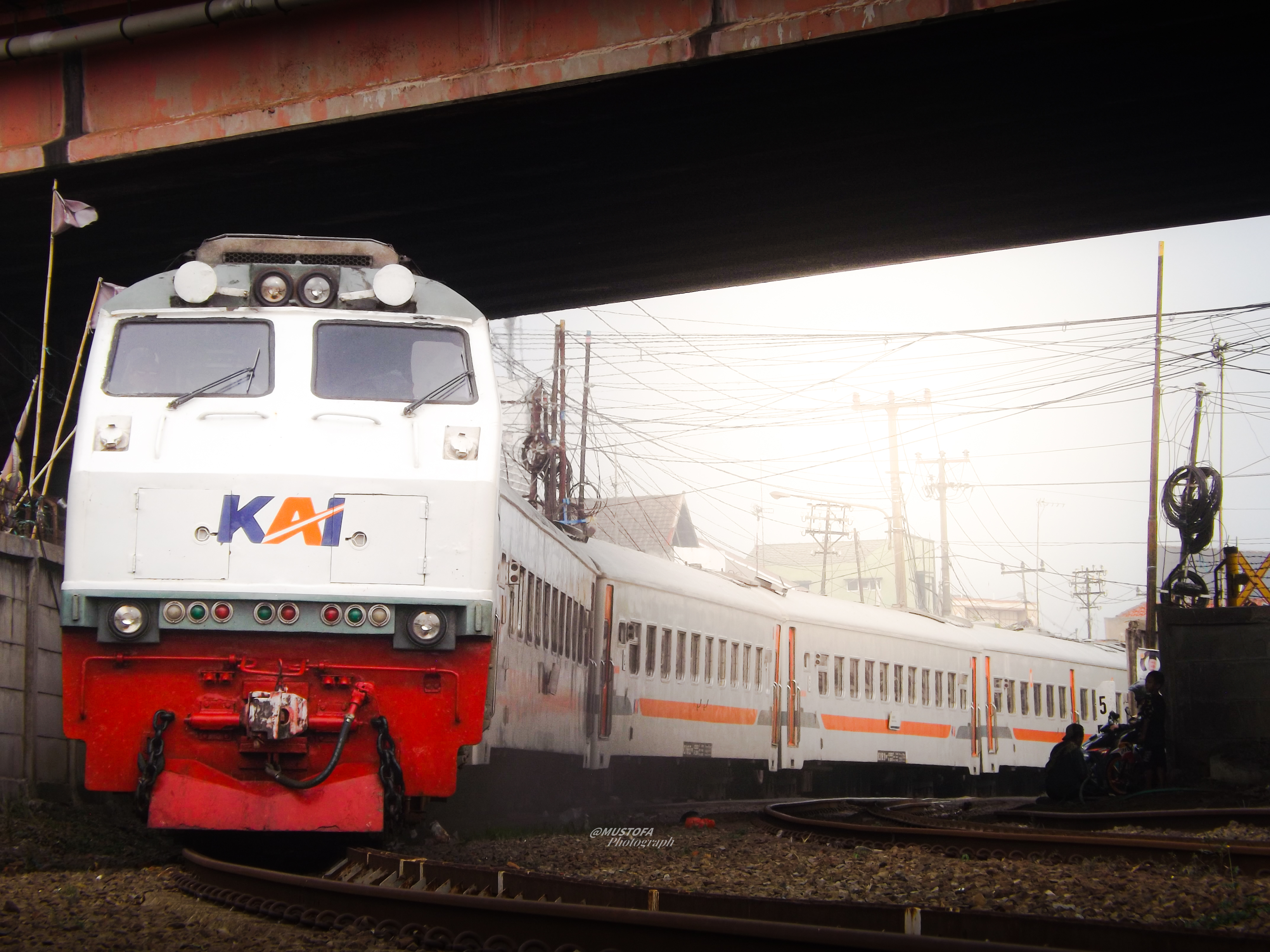
- Serayu train pulled by GE U20C entering Cikampek Station

Overview
- Service type: Inter-city rail
- Status: Operating
- Locale: Jakarta and Central Java, Indonesia
- Predecessor: Patas Bandung-Jakarta (1950s)
- First service: 15 November 1990; 35 years ago
- Current operator: KAI Operational Area V Purwokerto

Route
- Termini: Purwokerto; Pasar Senen
- Stops: 22
- Distance travelled: 423 km (263 mi)
- Service frequency: Twice in a day
- Train numbers: 283/286-284/285 (morning); 287/290-288/289 (night) (start from 1 February)

On-board services
- Class: Economy class only
- Disabled access: Restricted due to age of rolling stock
- Seating arrangements: Bus style (3-2)
- Catering facilities: On-board café
- Baggage facilities: Overhead racks, baggage carriage

Technical
- Rolling stock: 1 GE U18C, GE U20C, or GE CM20EMP locomotive; 6 economy class AC PSO carriages; 1 bagage "Cargo" carriage; 1 dining carriage; 1 generator carriage
- Track gauge: 1,067 mm (3 ft 6 in)
- Operating speed: 60–90 km/h

Serayu is an economy-class train running twice a day between Purwokerto in Banyumas and Pasar Senen in Central Jakarta via South Java railway line. The train was previously known as Cepat Sidareja, Cipuja, and Citrajaya. The name Serayu is derived from the Serayu River, which the train crosses twice on its journey

== History ==
=== Opening as a Patas ===
The start of Serayu train history is called Patas Bandung-Jakarta at its inauguration in 1950s. Based on 1965 train schedule, the train runs 4 times vice-versa. In 1978, PJKA rearranged the train schedule and the Patas Bandung-Jakarta train extended to Banjar and renamed to Patas Banjar-Manggarai.

=== Opening as a Cepat ===
On 1980s, PJKA rearranged to Sidareja and Patas Bandung-Jakarta renamed to Cepat Sidareja.

=== Rebranding, extension and additional stop stations ===
In the 15 November 1990, PJKA rearranged to Kroya and Cepat Sidareja were rebranded to Serayu and thirteen years later (in 2013) the route was extended to Purwokerto and adding stopping stations, namely Cikarang (since 1 March 2022) and Kebasen (since 18 December 2024).

== Route ==
Serayu train route map, accurate since 1 February 2025 (based on 2025 train travel graphics in Java)

The Serayu train runs four times daily, twice per direction, following the route.

=== Current ===
Station name	Distance from (km)		Location	
Station name	Previous station	Purwokerto	Regency/Cities	Province
Purwokerto^{1}	—		Banyumas	Central Java
Kebasen^{2}	14.359		Banyumas	Central Java
Kroya	12.808	27.167	Cilacap	Central Java
Maos	12.698	39.865	Cilacap	Central Java
Jeruklegi	13.607	53.472	Cilacap	Central Java
Gandrungmangun	22.430	75.902	Cilacap	Central Java
Sidareja	7.396	83.298	Cilacap	Central Java
Banjar	35.676	118.974	Banjar	West Java
Ciamis	22.273	141.247	Ciamis	West Java
Tasikmalaya	18.503	159.750	Tasikmalaya	West Java
Cipeundeuy	35.655	195.405	Garut	West Java
Cibatu	20.907	216.312	Garut	West Java
Leles	10.671	226.983	Garut	West Java
Kiaracondong	42.836	269.819	Bandung	West Java
Cimahi	13.167	282.986	Cimahi	West Java
Purwakarta	43.887	326.873	Purwakarta	West Java
Cikampek	19.063	345.936	Karawang	West Java
Karawang	21.297	367.233	Karawang	West Java
Cikarang	19.421	386.654	Bekasi Regency	West Java
Bekasi	16.737	403.391	Bekasi	West Java
Jatinegara^{3}	14.802	418.193	East Jakarta	Jakarta
Pasar Senen^{1}	5.605	423.798	Central Jakarta	Jakarta

Notes:

^1 Termini.
^2 Morning schedule only.
^3 Stop only on the route to Pasar Senen.

=== Planned ===
Starting from 1 February, Serayu train will be stop at station below.

Station name	Location		Note
Station name	Regency/Cities	Province	Note
Bojong	Ciamis	West Java	Morning schedule to Pasar Senen only.
Manonjaya	Tasikmalaya	West Java	Morning schedule to Pasar Senen only.
Awipari	Tasikmalaya	West Java	Night schedule to Purwokerto only.
Rajapolah	Tasikmalaya Regency	West Java	Night schedule to Pasar Senen only.
Ciawi	Tasikmalaya Regency	West Java	Night schedule to Pasar Senen only.
Cirahayu	Tasikmalaya Regency	West Java	Morning schedule to Purwokerto only.
Bumiwaluya	Garut	West Java	Night schedule to Pasar Senen only.
Nagreg	Bandung Regency	West Java	Morning schedule to Pasar Senen only.
Bandung	Bandung	West Java	to get on and off passengers.
Cilame	West Bandung	West Java	Night schedule to Purwokerto only.
Sasaksaat	West Bandung	West Java	Morning schedule to Pasar Senen and night schedule to Purwokerto.
Maswati	West Bandung	West Java	Night schedule to Pasar Senen only.

== Incidents ==
- On 25 October 1995, the Galuh (name at that time) train coupled with the Kahuripan derailed around Cirahayu. This incident resulted in many trains falling into a ravine and two locomotives being severely damaged and requiring extensive maintenance. The majority of the dead and injured were from the carriages that fell into the ravine.
- On 16 October 2024, two pedestrians consisting of a father and child were hit by a Serayu train when they were about to cross the tracks between Kiaracondong and Gedebage Stations. At the time of the incident, the child forced himself to cross and did not realize that a train was passing directly. The child and father was taken to the hospital but his life lost.
