= Bandung-Ciwidey Railway =

Indonesian Railway

Bandung–Ciwidey

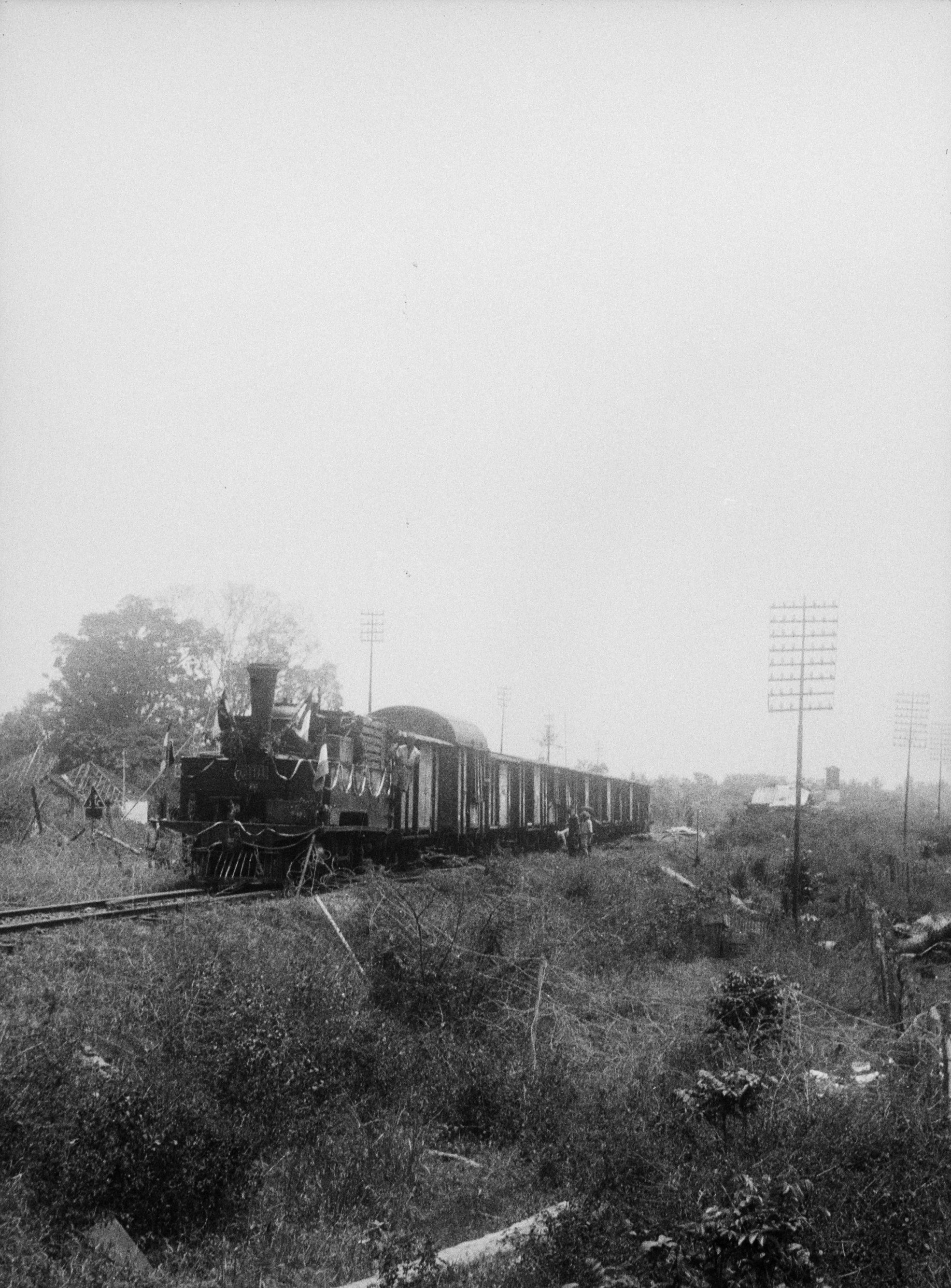
- Steam locomotive journey on the Bandung–Ciwidey railway line.

Overview
- Status: Inactive
- Owner: PT Kereta Api Indonesia
- Termini: Bandung railway station; Ciwidey station
- Stations: 6

Service
- Type: Branch line
- System: Light rail
- Services: 1
- Operator(s): PT Kereta Api Indonesia

History
- Opened: 1921–1924

Technical
- Track gauge: 1067 mm
- Operating speed: 40–60 km/h (25–37 mph)

The Bandung–Ciwidey railroad is an inactive rail line in Indonesia. This route was built by the Dutch colonial government to transport agricultural products.

== History ==
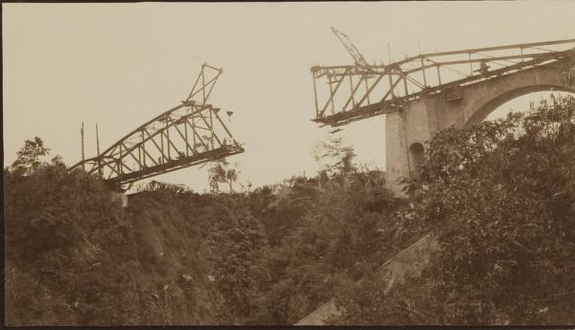
Rancagoong Bridge when it was built for this route

The Dutch colonization efforts focused on exploiting the plantation products of southern Bandung, which needed a more efficient and cost-effective transportation system. Prior to this development, the transportation of estate products to various destinations within the region relied on carts, incurring costs of 15 to 18 cents per ton. However, this method of transportation was hindered by the challenging access to Bandung, due to the considerable distance involved.

As a result, the Dutch authorities decided to construct a railway line connecting Bandung and Ciwidey, with an estimated construction cost of ƒ1,776,000.00. Pursuant to a regulation issued on June 1, 1918, a tram line was constructed comprising the Bandung–Kopo (Soreang) segment, which was subsequently extended to Ciwidey, as well as a branch line connecting Dayeuhkolot and Majalaya. According to a report by Staatsspoorwegen, the railway line was officially opened for the Bandung-Kopo (Soreang) segment and the Kiaracondong-Karees connection on February 13, 1921, while the Soreang-Ciwidey segment was inaugurated on June 17, 1924.

In addition, the Dutch authorities had previously contemplated constructing an extension railway line from Ciwidey to Ciletuh. The proposed route would traverse Ciwidey–Leuweung Datar–Citambur–Kadupandak–Sagaranten–Cicurug II–Ciracap–Ciletuh, spanning approximately 200 km from Bandung. Notably, this line would be electrified, necessitating the construction of several power plants, including one located near the Cigambung waterfall. However, the plan was never realized due to the untimely demise of R.A. Eekhout, the director who initiated the proposal, in 1911.

This railway line was also planned to have a branch at Banjaran Station to Pangalengan. This was stated in the regulation issued on March 18, 1921, regulating the construction of the Citali–Sumedang, Banjaran–Pangalengan, Kopo–Ciwidey, and Garut–Cikajang railway lines. However, the first two railway lines on the list were never built.

Originally, this railway line did not start from the Cikudapateuh station yard but on the road section between the station and Kiaracondong station. In the middle of this section is Cibangkonglor station. There is a branch from the Cibangkong Bus Stop to the Cavalry and the Karees weapons factory, while from Cibangkonglor Station there is a line to the Pertamina Bandung Depot. Meanwhile, the calculation of the kilometer location of the stations is not from Cikudapateuh station, but from Bandung station.

The railway line was deactivated in 1982 because it could not compete with private cars and public transportation. Although the Directorate General of Railways has made a reactivation master plan, there are currently no signs that this line will be evicted and worked on. The station buildings are still there, but some are well maintained and some are damaged. The assets are controlled by PT Kereta Api Indonesia and some of the land where the former line was located has been built into residential areas.

For some time this line was only active at several points, such as the line to Cavalry and the line to Pertamina Depot. Some of the tracks were used until the mid-2000s to transport tanks from Pindad to Cavalry and vice versa.
