= Kiaracondong railway station =

Railway station in Indonesia

Kiaracondong Station Stasiun Kiaracondong
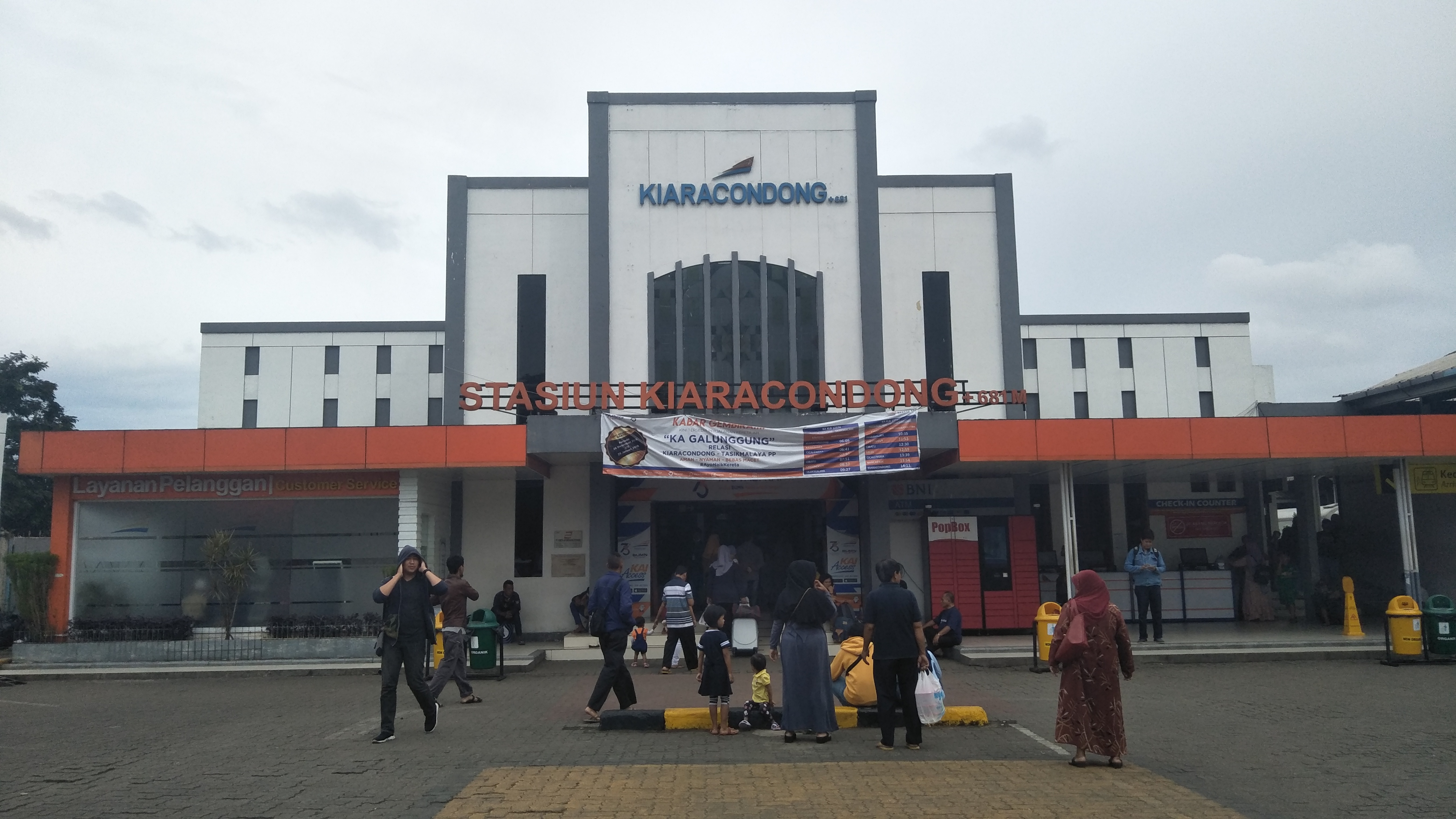
- Kiaracondong Station

General information
- Other names: Kircon Station
- Location: Babakansari, Kiaracondong, Bandung; West Java; Indonesia
- Coordinates: 6°55′28.76″S 107°38′47.62″E
- Elevation: +681 m (2,234 ft)
- Owner: Kereta Api Indonesia
- Operator: Kereta Api Indonesia; KAI Commuter
- Lines: Garut Commuter Line; Greater Bandung Commuter Line; Padalarang–Kasugihan
- Platforms: 2 side platforms 5 island platforms
- Tracks: 7

Construction
- Structure type: Ground
- Parking: Available
- Cycle facilities: Bicycle parking
- Accessible: Available
- Architectural style: Art deco (north building)

Other information
- Station code: KAC • 1601 • KIRCON
- Classification: Large class type B

History
- Opened: 1923
- Former names: Kiaratjondong Halt
Location
- Location within Bandung

Kiaracondong Station (KAC) or commonly known as Kircon Station is the second largest railway station in Bandung, West Java, Indonesia. It is located near the Kiaracondong street (also known as Ibrahim Adjie street), on the Kiaracondong district, Bandung. The station located near the Kiaracondong traditional market and Kiaracondong fly over road.

The train station located is in Kiaracondong, on the eastern side of Bandung.

== History ==
In the past, during the construction of the cross-Java railway line carried out by Staatsspoorwegen (SS), there were no Kiaracondong and Cikudapateuh stations, let alone Andir, Ciroyom, or Bandung Gudang. The 1894 map only mentions the names of Bandung Station and Gedebage as stations in the city of Bandung (Gedebage used to be on the outskirts of the city of Bandung).

In some literature, such as the SS annual report, this station was built in the past due to the development of Bandung into a major city. Due to the increasing need for passengers and goods, the Colonial Government decided to build a double-track on the Padalarang–Bandung–Kiaracondong route, which was fully realized. This construction also requires the existence of several stops and shunting points, such as Gadobangkong halt, Cimindi Station, railroad switch control station at Andir, freight train departure point at Ciroyom for Bandung Gudang Station, Cikudapateuh Station, and Kiaracondong Station. Steven Anne Reitsma also discussed in detail about this dual track and its effect on the economy of Bandung. Although the double track itself was opened in 1921, simultaneously with the opening of the Bandung–Ciwidey and Rancaekek–Tanjungsari segments, this station was only completed in 1923 under the name Kiaratjondong halt.

Since 6 April 1999, this station has used electric signaling system produced by Alstom.

== Building and layout ==
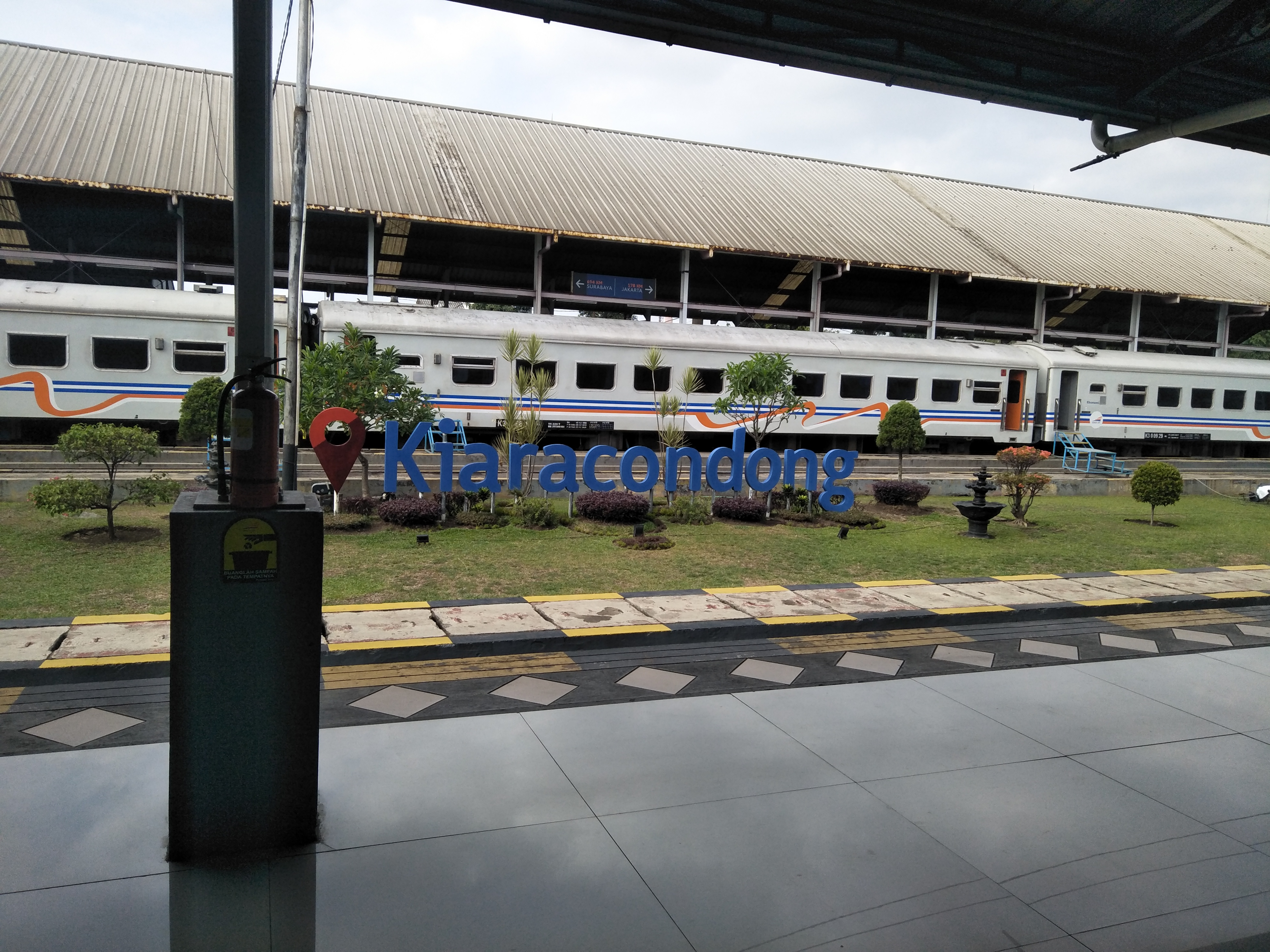
Inside the Kiaracondong station complex with a location marker similar to those at Padalarang station and other stations on KAI's Operational Area 2 of Bandung and Operational Area 9 of Jember

This station has seven train lines with line 3 being a straight track for a single track from and towards Cicalengka as well as a double track upstream direction (towards Bandung/ Padalarang), while line 2 is a straight track for a double track downstream direction (from Bandung/Padalarang).

There are two entrances to Kiaracondong Station. The north wing entrance with a building inspired by art deco architecture faces Jalan Ibrahim Adjie, while the old station building faces Jalan Stasiun on the south wing. Lines 1 to 5 are covered with overcapping roofs. The north wing has a fairly large parking area, while the south wing has no parking area at all due to the dense population density.

Near this station is the Kiaracondong railway workshop, a workshop specifically used for bridge maintenance and repairs; This includes procuring spare parts for active railway bridges, repairing bridge frames, constructing new bridges, and routine maintenance.

From this station there used to be a branch line to Ciwidey which had been decommissioned. The branch starts west of Kiaracondong Station, in the middle of the road section between Cikudapateuh-Kiaracondong. In the middle of the plot there is the Cibangkonglor signal post which now only remains of the signal pole. In the same place there is also a short path to Karees which has also been disabled.

Regarding the second phase of the double track project across Greater Bandung on the Kiaracondong–Gedebage plot which started in 2022, the station embankment is undergoing a major overhaul.

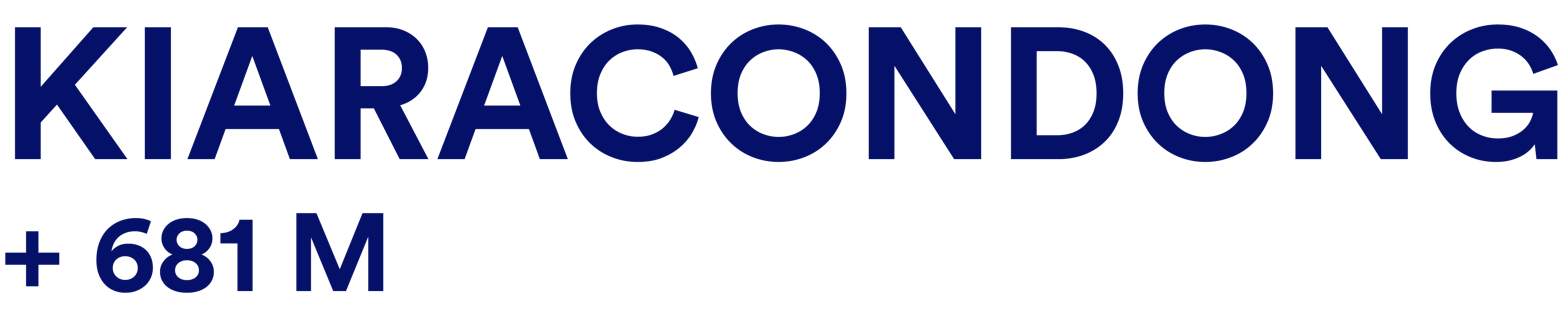
North side of the main building (inter-city trains)
Side platform
Line 7
Rail siding
Island platform
Line 6
Inter-city train departure and arrival
Island platform
Line 5
Inter-city train departure and arrival
Line 4
Inactive
Island platform
Line 3
Inter-city train departure and arrival

Straight tracks to Bandung

Island platform
Line 2
← (Cikudapateuh) Garut Commuter Line to Padalarang/Purwakarta

← (Cikudapateuh) Greater Bandung Commuter Line to Padalarang/Purwakarta

Inter-city train departure and arrival

Straight tracks to Cicalengka

Island platform
Line 1
Garut Commuter Line to Cibatu/Garut (Cimekar) →

Greater Bandung Commuter Line to Cicalengka (Cimekar) →

Side platform
South side of the main building (inter-city and local trains)

== Services ==
This Station only serve economy class passenger train to east side of Bandung, as well as several intercity train that crossing this station from Jakarta, and several commuter train servicing destinations in greater Bandung.

Intercity Trains that use this station:

- Cikuray, from Garut and Pasar Senen
- Kahuripan, from and to Blitar
- Kutojaya Selatan, from and to Kutoarjo
- Lodaya, to Solo Balapan and Bandung
- Malabar, to Malang and Bandung
- Mutiara Selatan, to Malang and Bandung
- Pangandaran, from Banjar and Gambir
- Papandayan, from Garut and Gambir
- Pasundan, from and to Surabaya Gubeng
- Serayu, to Purwokerto and Pasar Senen
- Baturraden Express, to Purwokerto and Bandung

Several commuter trains also pass through this station:

- Greater Bandung Commuter Line, to Padalarang and Cicalengka
- Garut Commuter Line, to Purwakarta and Garut

== Supporting transportation ==
The available supporting transportation modes at Kiaracondong station are:

Public transportation type	Route number	Route	Destination
	1A	Abdul Muis–Cicaheum via Binong	Cicaheum bus terminal
	1A	Abdul Muis–Cicaheum via Binong	Abdul Muis bus terminal
	7	Cicaheum–Ciwastra–Derwati	Sentot Alibasyah street (at the east of Gasibu field)
	7	Cicaheum–Ciwastra–Derwati	Ciwastra market
	7	Cicaheum–Ciwastra–Derwati	Raya Dewarti street
	8	Cicaheum–Leuwi Panjang	Kiaracondong station (at the east of Kiara Artha Park)
	8	Cicaheum–Leuwi Panjang	Leuwi Panjang bus terminal
	16	Dago–Riung Bandung	Dago bus terminal
	16	Dago–Riung Bandung	Riung Bandung bus terminal
	30	Cidadas–Kebon Kalapa via Binong	Ahmad Yani street (Cidadas)
	30	Cidadas–Kebon Kalapa via Binong	Abdul Muis bus terminal
	32	Cidadas–Cibatu–Panyileukan	Ahmad Yani street (Cidadas)
	32	Cidadas–Cibatu–Panyileukan	Cibiru roundabout
	32	Cidadas–Cibatu–Panyileukan	Raya Panyileukan street (at the front of Taman Bangkit)

== Gallery ==
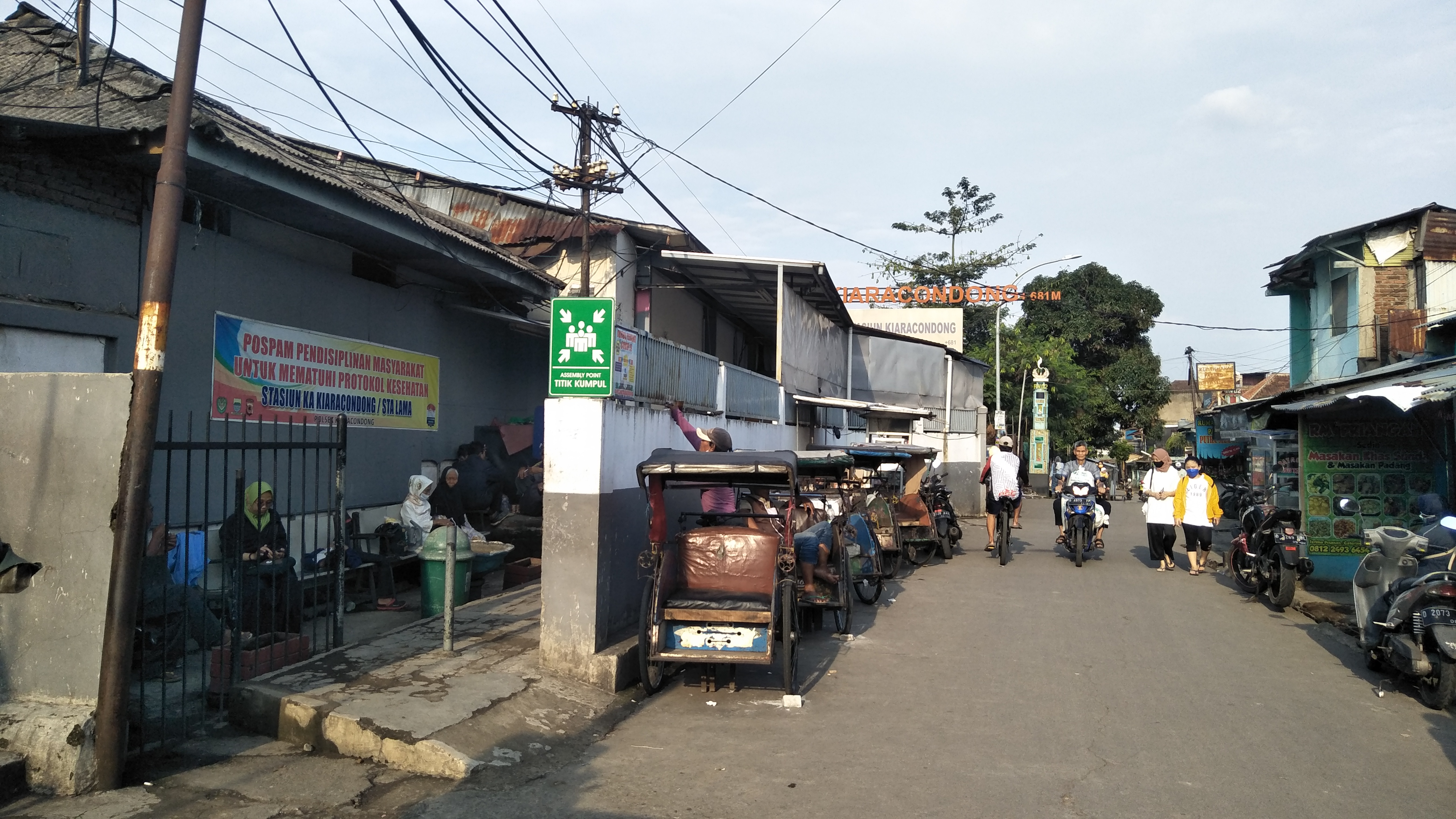
The south entrance of the station

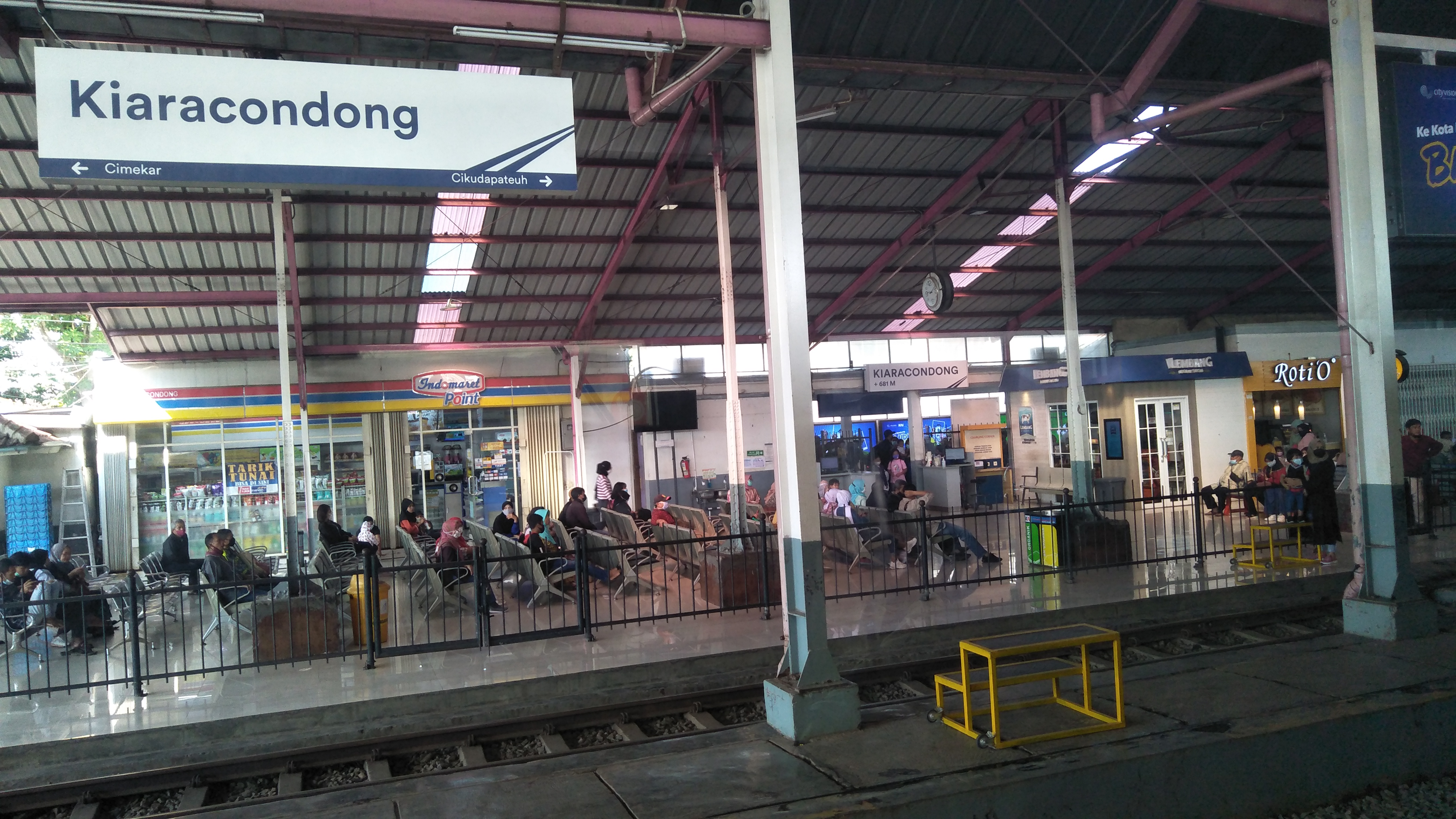
Inside the south main building of the station

Preceding station	Kereta Api Indonesia	Following station
Cikudapateuh towards Padalarang	Padalarang–Kasugihan	Gedebage towards Kasugihan
