= Greater Bandung Commuter Line =

Commuter rail system in Greater Bandung, Indonesia

Greater Bandung Commuter Line Bandung Line
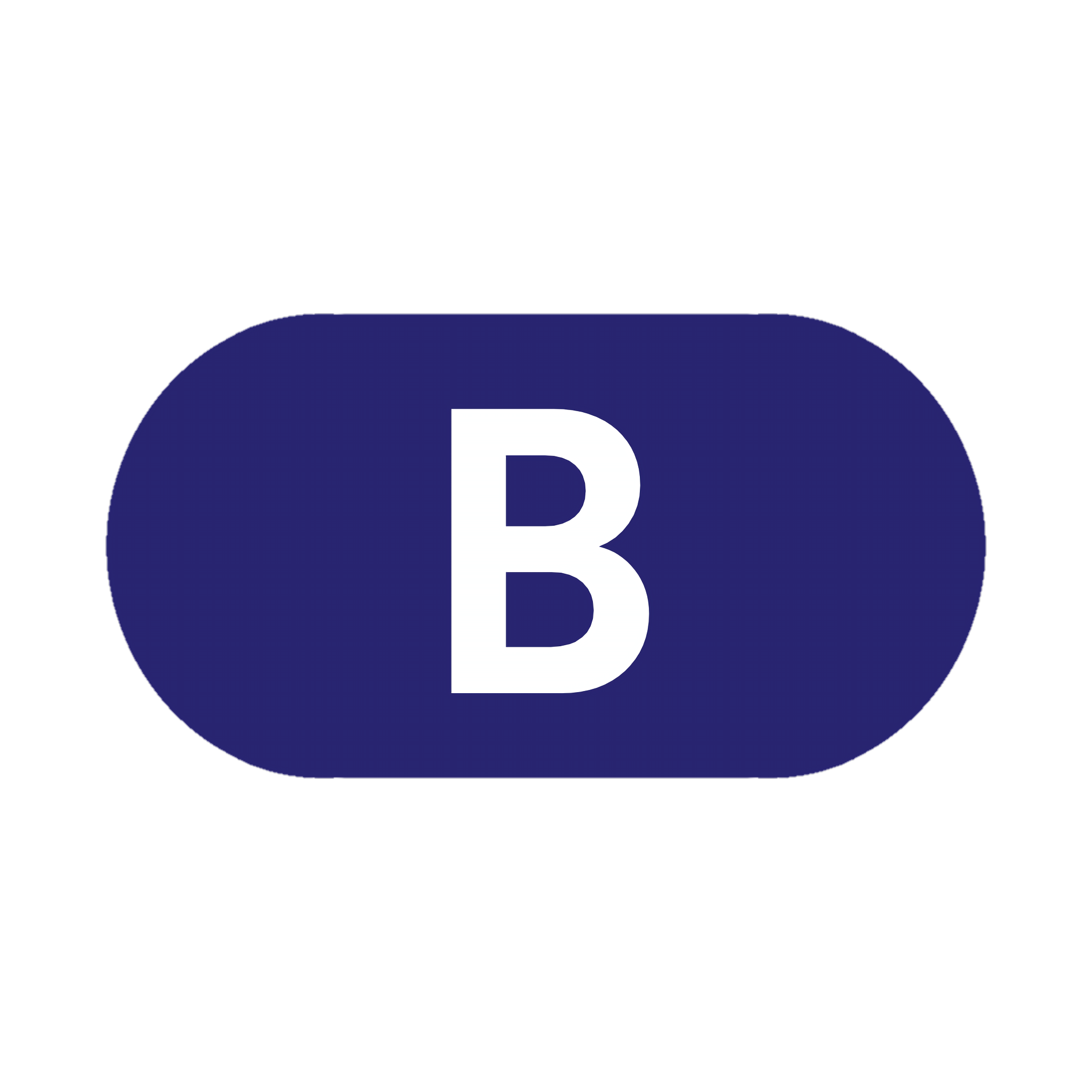

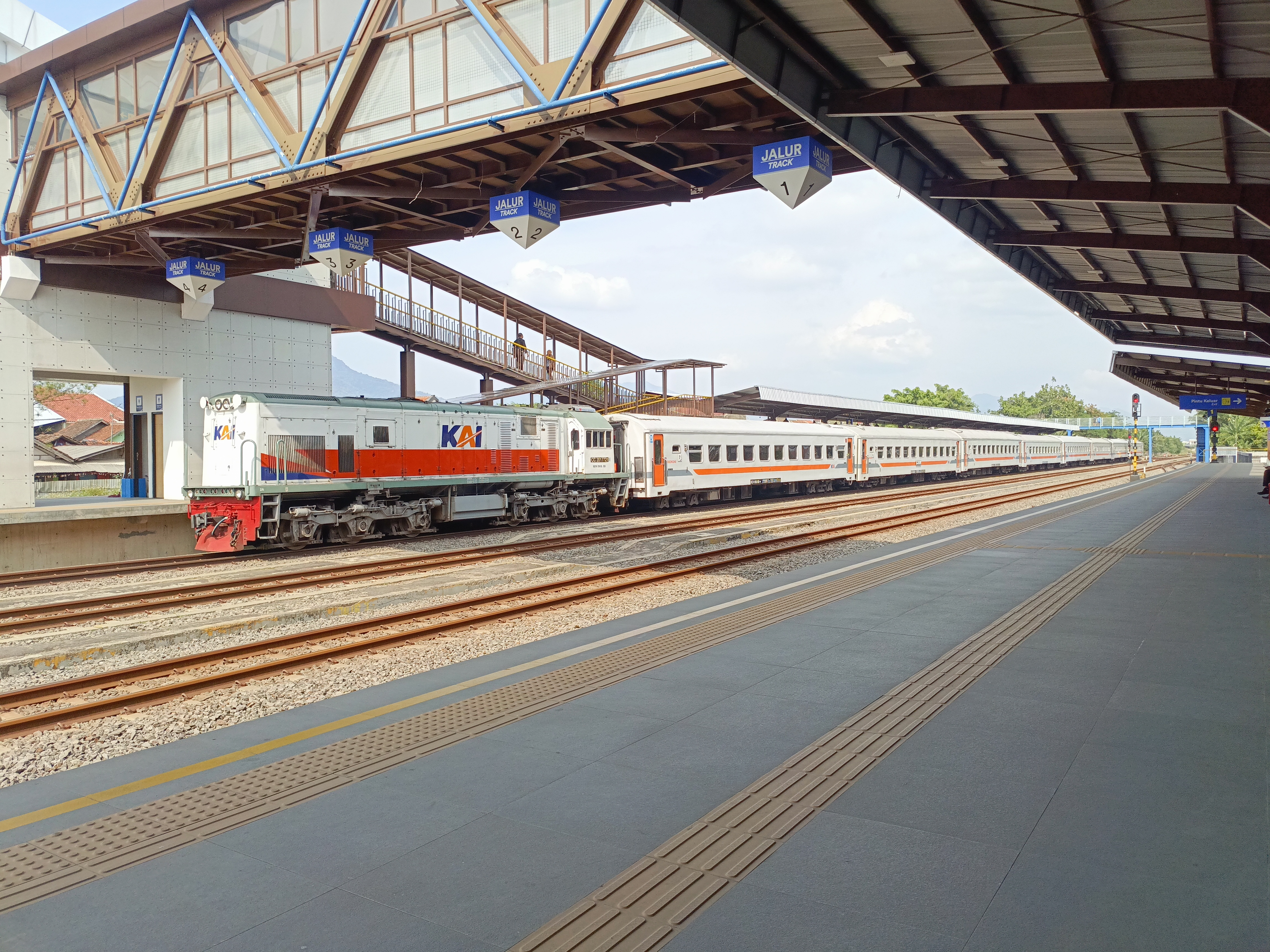
- Commuter Line Bandung Raya was about to stop at Rancaekek station

Overview
- Native name: Commuter Line Bandung Raya
- Owner: Kereta Api Indonesia
- Locale: West Java
- Transit type: Commuter rail
- Number of lines: 1
- Number of stations: 12
- Daily ridership: 75,070 (Highest); 51,307 (Average, 2025)
- Annual ridership: 18.73 million (2025)
- Headquarters: Bandung, Indonesia
- Website: commuterline.id

Operation
- Began operation: 2023
- Operator: KAI Commuter
- Character: At grade
- Train length: 8 cars per trainset

Technical
- System length: 42 km (26 mi)
- Track gauge: 1,067 mm (3 ft 6 in)
- Top speed: 90 km/h

Commuter Line Bandung Route

The Greater Bandung Commuter Line (Indonesian: Commuter Line Bandung Raya) is a commuter rail service in West Java, Indonesia operated by KAI Commuter Region 2 Bandung, which serves the Purwakarta – Padalarang – Cicalengka route. This train stops at every station it passes except Andir Station which is still under construction.

The Directorate General of Railways of the Ministry of Transportation, through the Bandung Railway Engineering Center, and the Bandung City Government will soon electrify this service into an electric-powered KRL Commuterline system, similar to those in Greater Jakarta and Yogyakarta–Solo. The plan will start in 2024 with the first phase in the Padalarang – Bandung plot and continued with the second phase in the Bandung – Cicalengka plot. This plan is also expected to help connect the Whoosh high speed train service as an alternative to and from the Bandung city center.

== History ==
In 2015, this train used the regular K3 used by the Patas AC train and the Penataran Express train which stopped operating. As of April 1, 2022, there will be a change in operator and management of the Greater Bandung Commuter Line train, which was previously managed by Kereta Api Indonesia, then handed over to KAI Commuter.

The Bandung Raya Commuter Line train has undergone various developments, one of which is the station infrastructure. The stations on the Padalarang — Bandung route have undergone revitalization in support of the project and the Whoosh high speed train. Construction of the Kiaracondong railway station - Cicalengka double track is underway by the Direktorat Jenderal Perkeretaapian. In this project, Gedebage Station and Andir Station are being activated for passenger services.

There is talk of converting this series of trains into electric trains. In 2023, the Bandung City Transportation Department announced that the conversion project will be divided into two stages, namely Padalarang – Bandung plot and Bandung – Cicalengka. The plan is that the project will be completed in 2024.

Starting July 2023, along with the implementation of the 2023 train travel charts, the name of this train service will change from "KA Bandung Raya Ekonomi" to "Commuter Line Bandung Raya", in line with the uniformity of other local train brands in Indonesia.

== Naming ==
The general public, to this day, often refers to this train as "KRD" because it was initially running as a KRD (Diesel Multiple Unit). Apart from that, there was a mention of "KRD Economy" to differentiate it from KRD Patas which at that time was a business class train. As of June 1, 2023, along with the implementation of the train travel schedule (GAPEKA), the Bandung Raya local train will be rebranded as "Commuter Line Bandung Raya".

== Capacity ==
The current capacity in one trainset is around 742 seats, spread across seven economy class cars, all airconditioned. In its operation, tickets are sold with a composition of 100% seating and 50% standing tickets from the available seat capacity in one train series. In this case, there is also a limit on the number of tickets sold on each schedule at departure stations and stopover stations, initial departure stations are limited to approximately 500 tickets and stopover stations 50 to 100 tickets per schedule, this policy is implemented in order to meet the comfort required by passengers this train, as well as legally in the context of implementing Law Number 23 of 2007 concerning Railways.

== Rates ==
PT Kereta Api Indonesia Operational Area II Bandung impose a flat fare of IDR 5,000 or US$0.32 for Greater Bandung Commuter Line trains. As well as ordering Bandung Raya Commuter Line train tickets, you can use the Access By KAI application at least 2 hours to 7 days before departure and at the counter a few hours after the previous departure.

== Routes and stations ==
The Greater Bandung Commuter Line train crosses five districts and cities in West Java . The main route of this train connects the west to the east, starting from Padalarang in West Bandung Regency to Cicalengka in Bandung Regency and vice versa. Along the journey, the train will stop in the center of Cimahi City and Bandung City. There is also a longer route, from Cicalengka to Purwakarta, although with less frequency than the Padalarang—Cicalengkaroute.

In accordance with GAPEKA 2023, the Baraya Commuter Line has 40 two-way trips with a relationship composition:

- From west to east:
  - 17 trips from Padalarang to Cicalengka
  - 2 trips from Padalarang to Kiaracondong
  - 2 trips from Kiaracondong to Cicalengka
- From east to weat:
  - 17 trips from Cicalengka to Padalarang
  - 1 trip from Cicalengka to Kiaracondong
  - 1 trip from Cicalengka to Purwakarta

There are also 6 Garut Commuter Line trips that support the Greater Bandung Commuter Line.

Code Number	Station	Transfer/Notes	Location
LW10 B01 C01	Purwakarta	Terminal station. LW Walahar Commuter Line Garut Commuter Line Inter-city trains	Purwakarta Regency
B02 C02	Ciganea	Garut Commuter Line	Purwakarta Regency
B03 C03	Sukatani	Garut Commuter Line	Purwakarta Regency
B04 C04	Plered	Garut Commuter Line	Purwakarta Regency
B05 C05	Cikagondong	Garut Commuter Line	West Bandung Regency
B06 C06	Rendeh	Garut Commuter Line	West Bandung Regency
B07 C07	Maswati	Garut Commuter Line	West Bandung Regency
B08 C08	Sasaksaat	Garut Commuter Line	West Bandung Regency
B09 C09	Cilame	Garut Commuter Line	West Bandung Regency
B10 C10 KC01	Padalarang	Jakarta–Bandung Whoosh HSR Inter-city trains HSR Feeder Train Garut Commuter Line Padalarang bus terminal	West Bandung Regency
B11 C11	Gadobangkong	Garut Commuter Line Trans Metro Pasundan Share taxis (angkot)	West Bandung Regency
B12 C12 KC02	Cimahi	Garut Commuter Line HSR Feeder Train Inter-city trains Pasar Antri Baru bus terminal	Cimahi
B13 C13	Cimindi	Garut Commuter Line Share taxis (angkot)	Bandung
B14 C14	Andir	Under construction	Bandung
B15 C15	Ciroyom	Garut Commuter Line Ciroyom bus terminal	Bandung
B16 C16 KC03	Bandung	Inter-city trains HSR Feeder Train Garut Commuter Line Trans Metro Pasundan Trans Metro Bandung Trans Bandung Raya	Bandung
B17 C17	Cikudapateuh	Garut Commuter Line Trans Metro Bandung Trans Bandung Raya Share taxis (angkot)	Bandung
B18 C18	Kiaracondong	Inter-city trains Garut Commuter Line Share taxis (angkot)	Bandung
B19 C19	Gedebage	Garut Commuter Line DAMRI shuttle bus service from DAMRI bus pool (at Soekarno–Hatta St.) to Tegalluar Station	Bandung
B20 C20	Cimekar	Garut Commuter Line	Bandung
B21 C21	Rancaekek	Garut Commuter Line Share taxis (angkot)	Bandung Regency
B22 C22	Haurpugur	Garut Commuter Line	Bandung Regency
B23 C23	Cicalengka	Terminal station. Garut Commuter Line Cicalengka bus terminal	Bandung Regency

== Incident ==
On January 5, 2024, Greater Bandung Commuter Line train number 350 bound for Padalarang fatally collied with the Turangga train number PLB 65A with Surabaya Gubeng–Bandung route in Cikuya, Cicalengka, Bandung Regency, West Java, precisely at km181+100 or the incoming signal of Cicalengka Station. The collision killed four people; the Greater Bandung Commuter Line train driver and its assistant, Turangga train steward, and the Cimekar Station security personnel. Meanwhile, from the total of 287 Turangga passengers and 191 Greater Bandung Commuter Line passengers, 37 people were injured.

== Gallery ==
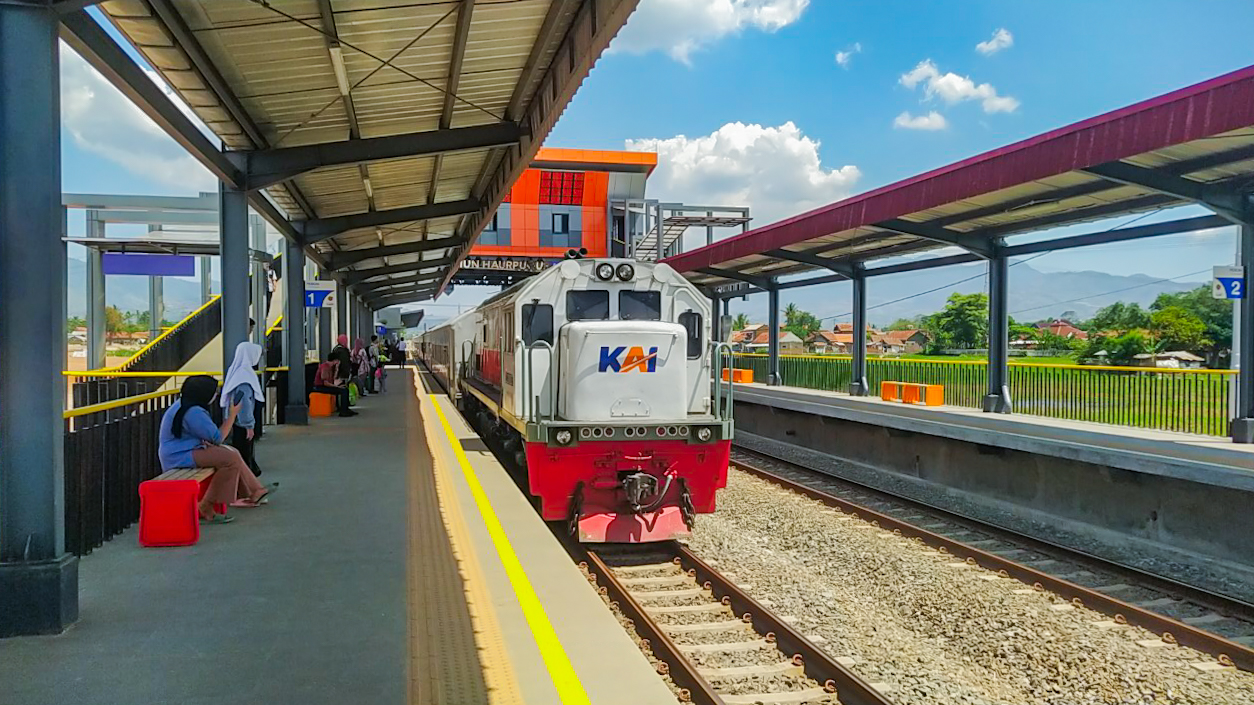
Commuter Line Bandung Raya preparing to stop in Haurpugur Station

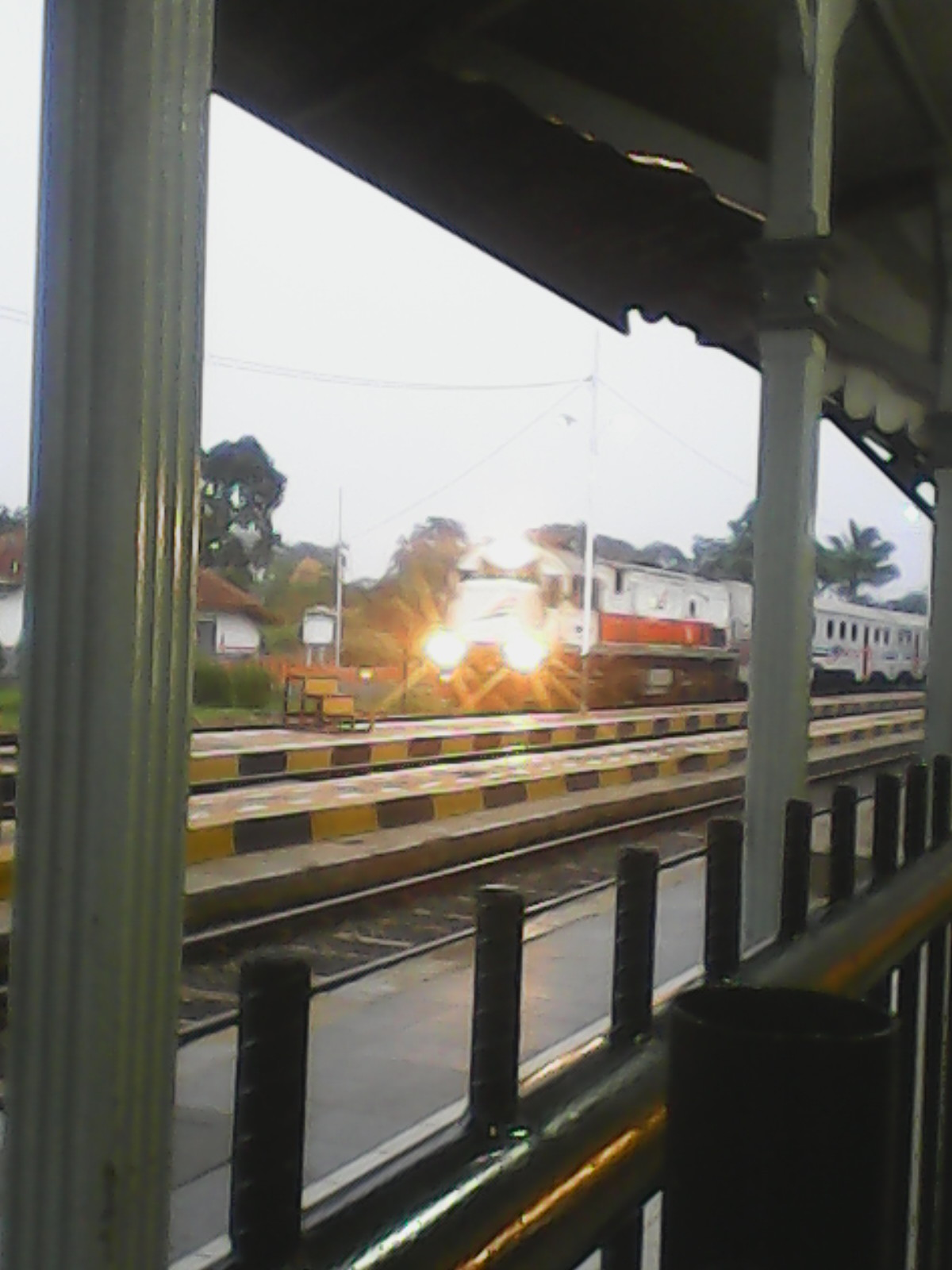
The Bandung Raya local train arrives at Cicalengka station

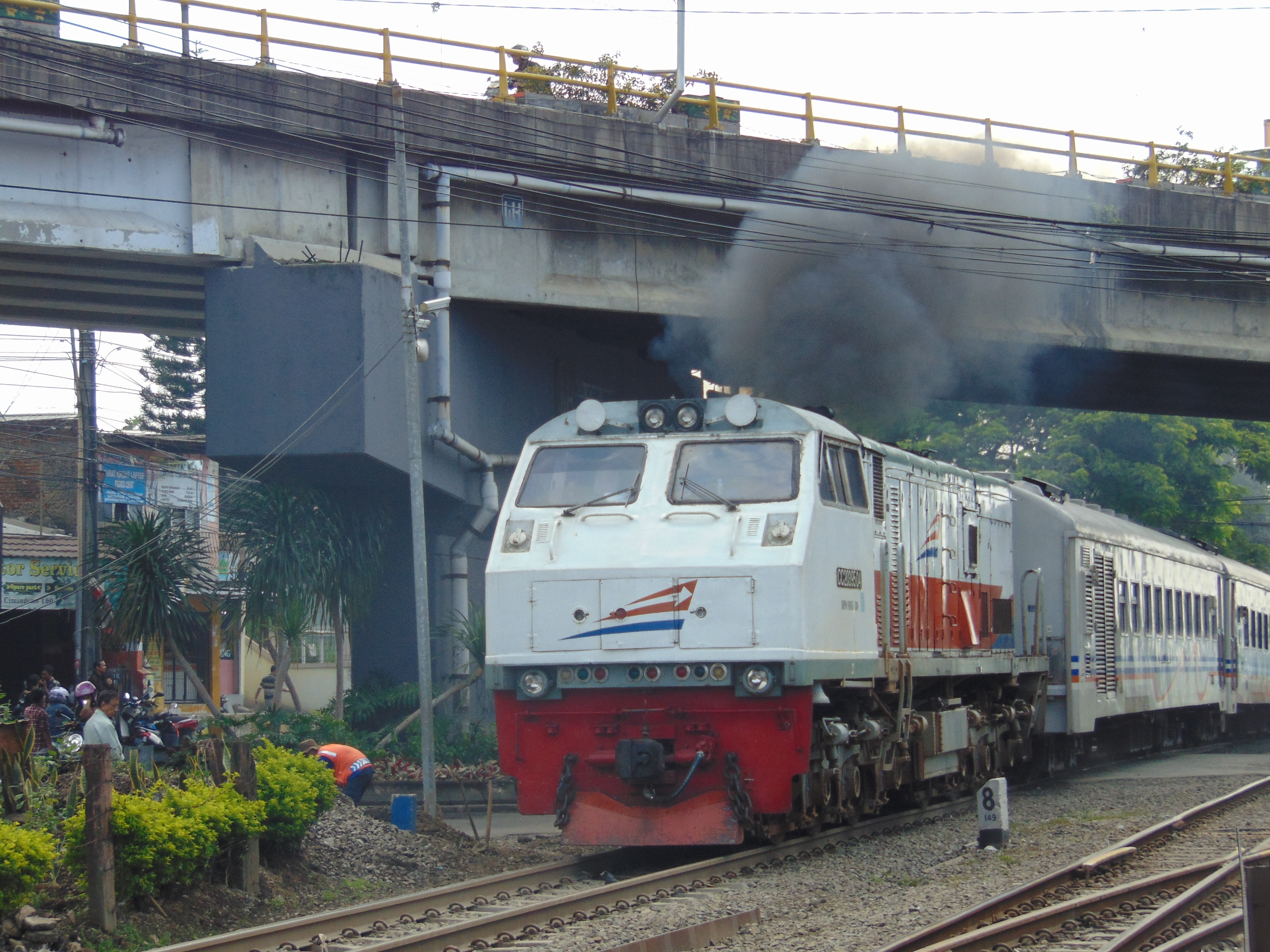
The local Bandung Raya train steams at Cimindi station

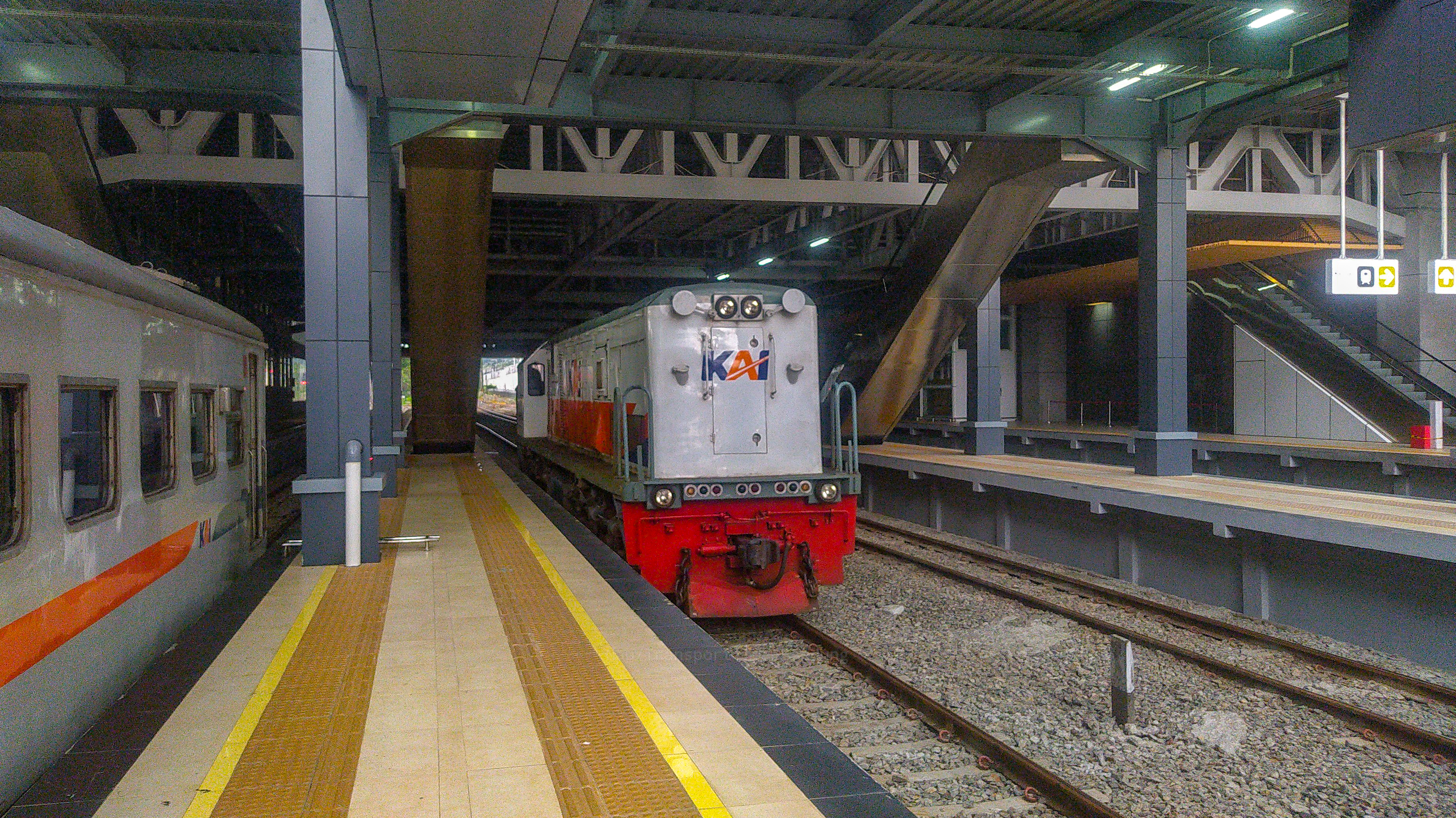
One of the locomotives at Padalarang Station

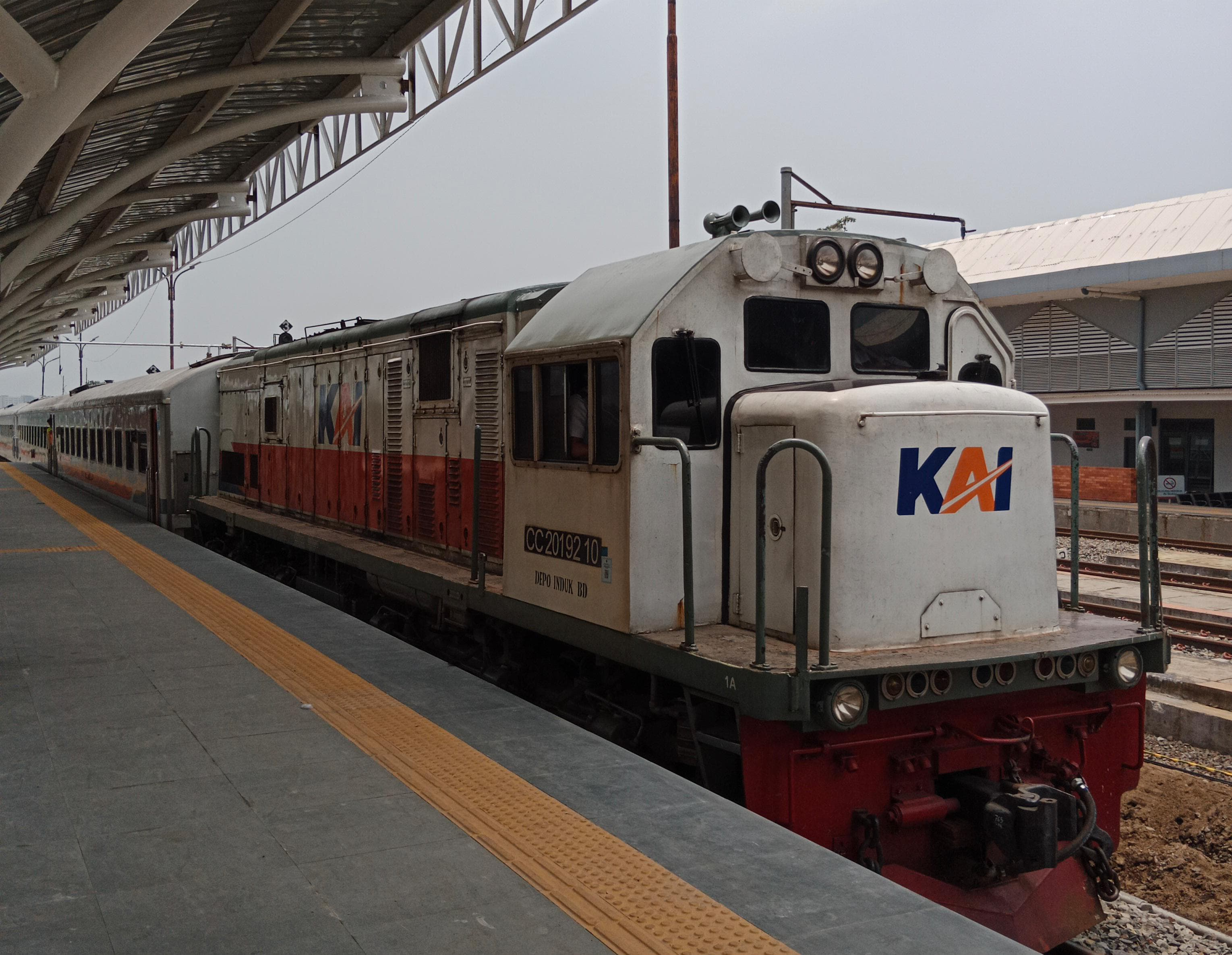
Greater Bandung commuter train at Rancaekek Station

== See also ==
- KCJB Feeder Train
- KAI Commuter
- High-speed rail in Indonesia
- Rail transport in Indonesia
