= Bandung railway station =

Railway station in Indonesia

B16C16KC03 Bandung Station Stasiun Bandung
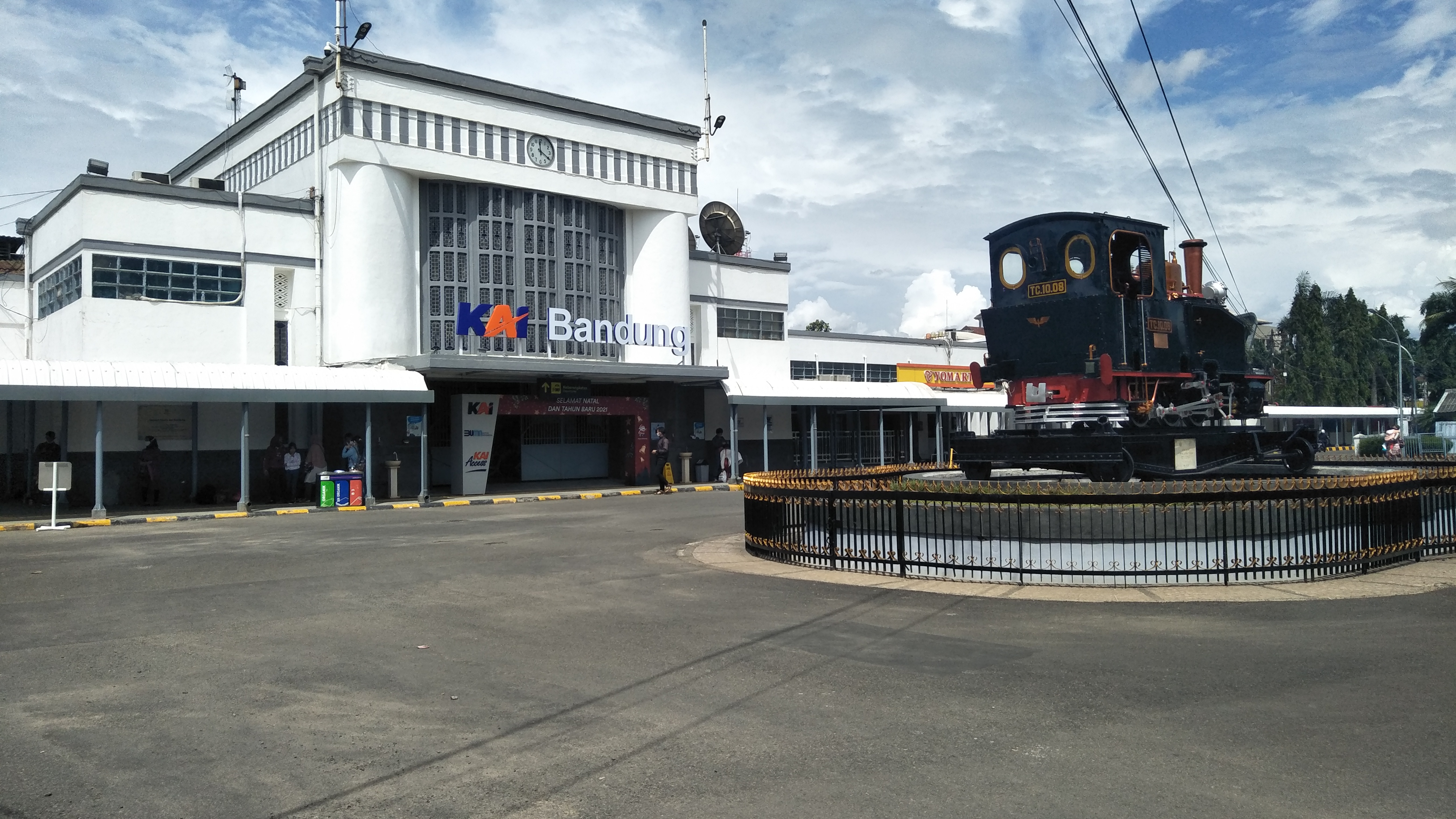
- South entrance of Bandung station, December 2020.

General information
- Other names: Hall Station
- Location: Kebon Kawung St. (north entrance), Stasiun Timur st. (south entrance) Kebonjeruk, Andir, Bandung; West Java; Indonesia
- Coordinates: 6°54′51″S 107°36′09″E
- Elevation: +709 m (2,326 ft)
- Owner: Kereta Api Indonesia
- Operator: Kereta Api Indonesia; KAI Commuter
- Lines: Greater Bandung Commuter Line; Garut Commuter Line; HSR Feeder Train; Padalarang–Kasugihan
- Platforms: 7
- Tracks: 10
- Connections: Trans Metro Pasundan: Trans Bandung Raya:

Construction
- Structure type: Ground
- Parking: Available
- Cycle facilities: Bicycle parking
- Accessible: Available
- Architect: E.H. de Roo (south building)
- Architectural style: Art Deco

Other information
- Station code: BD • 1430
- Classification: Large class type A

History
- Opened: 17 May 1884; 142 years ago
- Rebuilt: 1927–1928
- Original company: Staatsspoorwegen
Location
- Location within Bandung

Bandung Station (BD) (Indonesian: Stasiun Bandung, Sundanese: ᮞ᮪ᮒᮞᮤᮇᮔ᮪ ᮘᮔ᮪ᮓᮥᮀ) or Hall Station (Stasiun Hall) is the largest railway station in Bandung, West Java, Indonesia. Managed by Kereta Api Indonesia and its subsidiary KAI Commuter, it serves as the main station for Operational Area II Bandung of the KAI, administering Bandung and Priangan areas. The station, which is located at an altitude of +709 meters, is also the main station for the Bandung metropolitan area.

Originally it only had one station building in the south; but after being repaired by the Bandung city government, it is now divided into two buildings in the north and south. It serves executive class and mostly mixed class intercity trains to various destinations in Java.

Since 2014, Bandung Raya and Cibatu local trains were not served at the north gate, but are only served at the south gate, to improve services to passengers. It is also known as the terminal for share taxis (Indonesian: Angkutan Kota or Angkot) because it is also used as a stopover for many angkot to various destinations.

Bandung Station, like other major railway stations has supplementary facilities and infrastructure for train operation. It has a passenger coach depot on the west side, locomotive depot on the northwestern side, and turntable on the western side; as well as ticket reservation building in north building and cargo area in south building.

The headquarters of the Operational Area II Bandung of the KAI are located to the south of the station; the KAI main headquarters are located further east.

== Location ==
The station is on Kebon Kawung Street in central Bandung. The old station building was on Stasiun Timur street on the southern part of the railroad; later and currently the station has its new building on the northern part of the railroad.

On the Javanese railroad system, Bandung Station is on the Jakarta - Bandung - Yogyakarta - Surabaya railroad route — known as the Southern Java railroad route. The station is 709 meters above sea level.

== History ==
=== First building ===
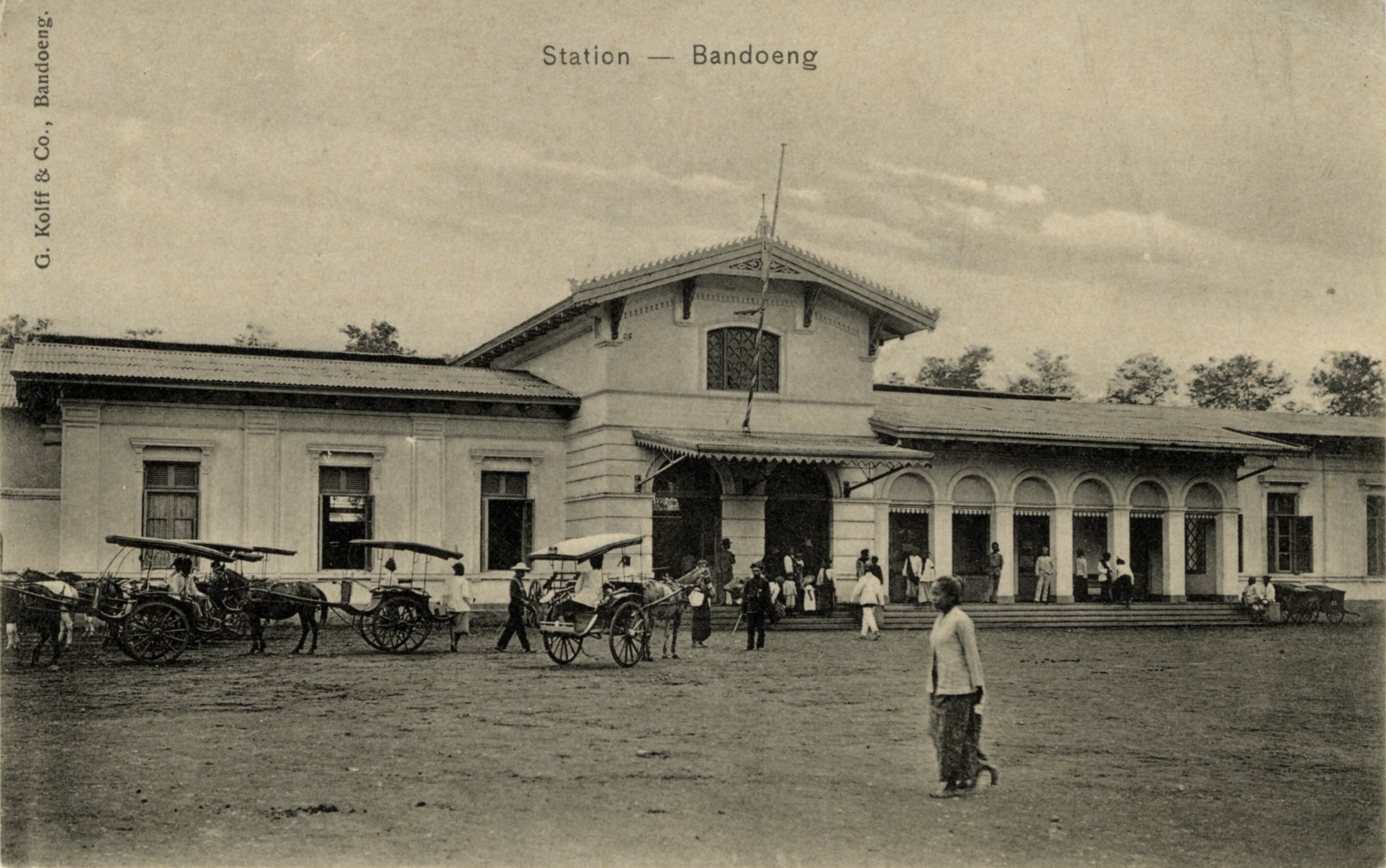
The first generation building of Bandung Station

In the Wajah Bandoeng Tempo Dulu book written by Haryoto Kunto in 1984, the idea to build Bandung Station was related to the opening of plantations in Bandung around 1870. The station was inaugurated on 17 May 1884 during the reign of Regent Koesoemadilaga; at the same time the Batavia-Bandung train line was also opened via Bogor and Cianjur. At the time, plantation landlords (preangerplanters) used the railway to pick up their agricultural products to Batavia quickly. To accommodate and store the products to be transported by train, warehouses were built in several places near Bandung Station, such as in Jalan Cibangkong, Jalan Cikudapateuh, Kosambi, Kiaracondong, Braga, Pasirkaliki, Ciroyom and Andir areas. After the inauguration of Bandung–Surabaya line on 1 November 1894, factory owners and sugar plantations from Central and East Java (Suikerplanters) rented train cars to Bandung to attend the first Congress of Sugar Plantation Entrepreneurs. The congress was the result of a meeting of the Executive Board of the Association of Sugar Plantation Entrepreneurs (Bestuur van de Vereniging van Suikerplanters) in Surabaya in 1896.

=== Second building ===
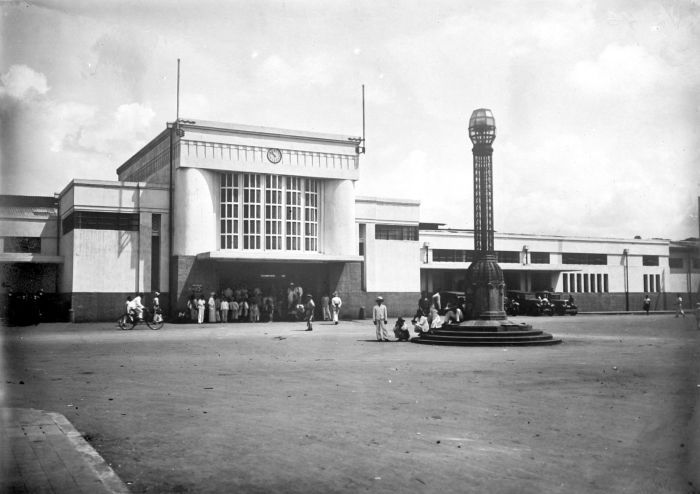
The south entrance of Bandung Station ca. 1930 with a monument commemorating the 50th anniversary of Staatsspoorwegen

A monument was inaugurated in front of the south entrance on 6 April 1925 designed by architect E.H. de Roo, built to commemorate the 50th anniversary of Staatsspoorwegen's (SS) contributions in Java. The monument is believed to be a gift from the Mayor of Bandung to the SS for their services in uniting Java by rail. The monument was lit by lights and was inaugurated with a ceremony attended by Bandung residents and high-ranking SS officers.

In 1927–1928, E.H. de Roo also changed the architecture of Bandung Station, one of which is marked by the stained glass decoration on the southern platform which is in the Art Deco style. Previously, in 1918 the construction project for the new Bandung–Rancaekek–Jatinangor–Tanjungsari–Citali line began, the Bandung–Citeureup–Majalaya line was built a year later, and the Citeureup–Banjaran–Pengalengan line was built in 1921. The route from Bandung to Kopo (Soreang) and later to Ciwidey was also built, as the route to tea plantations.

At the inauguration of the new Bandung Station, the Java Bode newspaper wrote that the local community celebrated it for two consecutive days. The train is a means of transportation for Bandung agricultural products, such as quinine, tea, coffee, and rubber, so that the city's economy is growing rapidly.

In 1990, the north platform was built which eventually became the frontage of the station on Jalan Kebon Kawung.

== Building and layout ==
=== Architecture ===
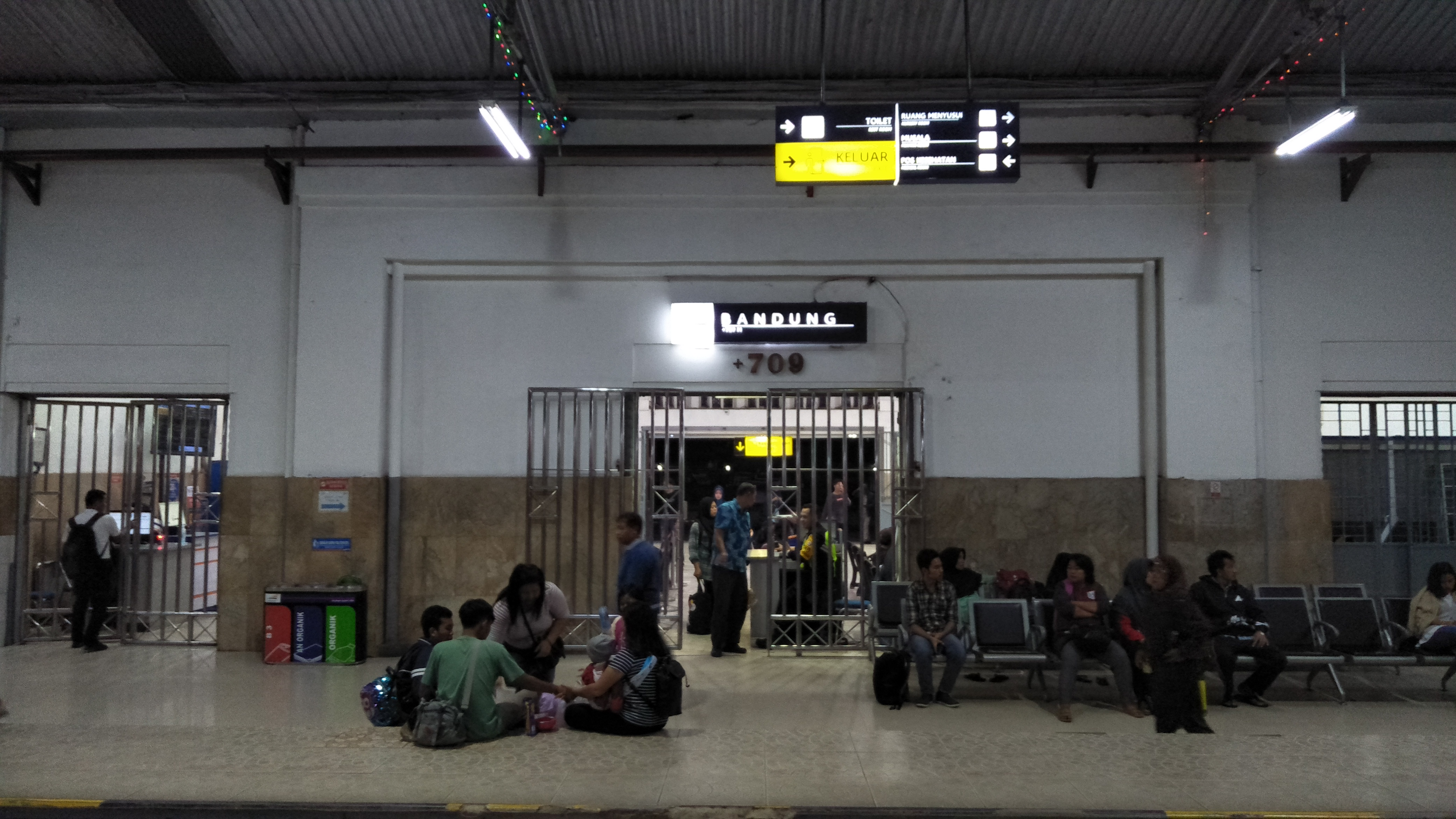
The interior of the station with the 2017-version signage

The building on the south side of Bandung Station has an Art Deco architectutal style, marked by the cube-like shape in the front hall. The building facade is designed to follow the old station facade (an Indies Empire style building, like other SS stations), but is dominated by transparent elements that different from the old architecture.

The north entrance building was formerly the Bandung Locomotive Depot which has now been decommissioned, while the south building is used as the second entrance. In front of the station are Operational Area II Bandung of KAI office whose yards are also made up for the station parking lot, mess hall, KAI Services Bandung office, special train police unit, and KAI health unit. To the northeast of the station is the KAI head office. To the west of the station is the former Bandung Gudang Station which is no longer active and has been replaced by Paskal Hyper Square shopping center.

=== Track layout ===
Bandung Station has 10 railway tracks; consists of six main tracks with tracks 3 and 4 being straight tracks, plus four tracks for train shunting activities. All tracks are used as train stops and shunting points. All passenger trains that pass on the Padalarang–Kroya line must stop at the station.

The station is equipped with a locomotive depot in the northwest of the station complex and a large train depot which has a rail turntable; it reaches area close to Ciroyom Station.

It has a footbridge to connect north and south building to the platform. Moreover, the platform was raised on track 1 and the platform between tracks 2 and 3, as well as the platform extension between tracks 4 and 5 and the platform between tracks 6 and 7, to support passengers going to the footbridge.

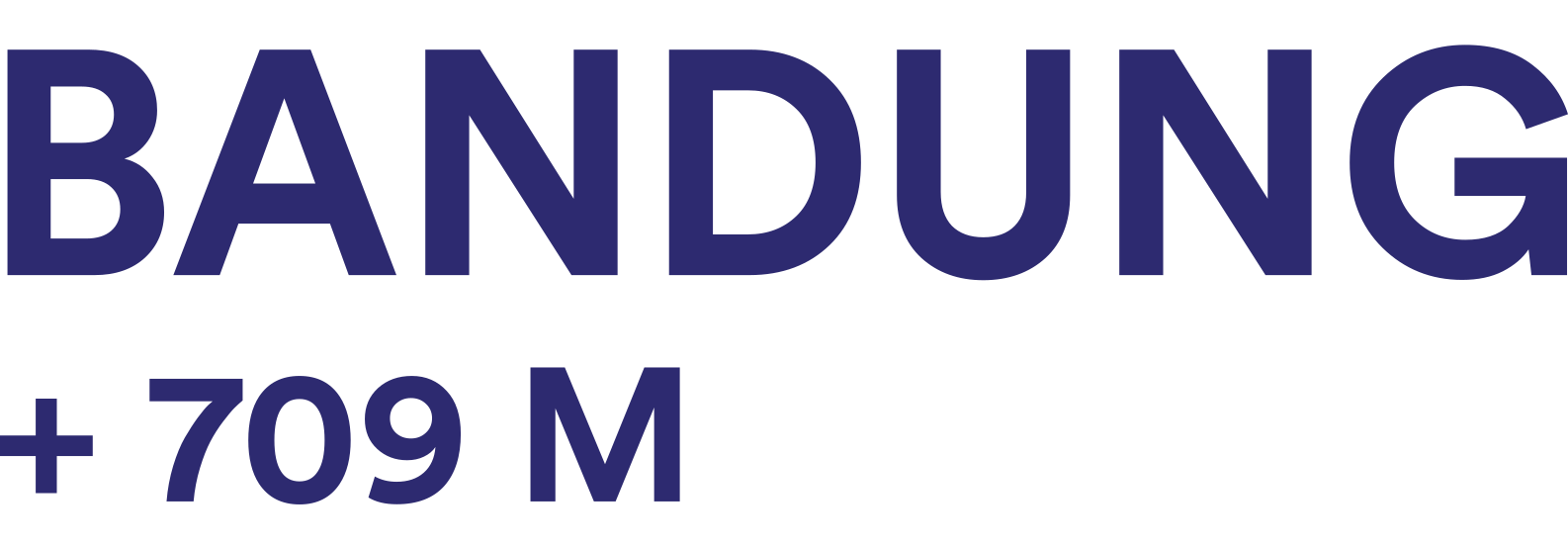
North building (only for inter-city train and HSR feeder train departures and arrivals only)
Line 10

Rail siding

Line 9

Island platform (under construction)
Line 8

Rail siding

Line 7
← (Cimahi)
HSR Feeder Train from and towards Padalarang

Island platform
Line 6

Inter-city train departure and arrival

Line 5

Island platform
Line 4

Inter-city train departure and arrival

Line 3

Inter-city train stop
← (Ciroyom/Cimindi)
Garut Commuter Line to Purwakarta, Padalarang, Cibatu, and Garut

Greater Bandung Commuter Line to Purwakarta, Padalarang, and Cicalengka

(Cikudapateuh) →
Island platform
Line 2
← (Ciroyom/Cimindi)
Garut Commuter Line to Purwakarta, Padalarang, Cibatu, and Garut Greater Bandung Commuter Line to Purwakarta, Padalarang, and Cicalengka
(Cikudapateuh) →
Line 1
← (Ciroyom/Cimindi)
Garut Commuter Line to Purwakarta, Padalarang, Cibatu, and Garut

Greater Bandung Commuter Line to Purwakarta, Padalarang, and Cicalengka

(Cikudapateuh) →
Side platform
South building (only for local/commuter train services)

=== Facilities ===
Bandung Station is often used as a pilot station by the KAI so that the quality of service is made on par with airports. KAI made the station the first of its type in Indonesia to implement a boarding pass ticket printing system since February 2016, as well as an X-ray baggage inspection system in October 2018.

To fulfill the work needs of train passengers, the KAI and Indonesian Ministry of State-Owned Enterprises inaugurated co-working spaces at nine major railway stations in Java, including Bandung Station. They was inaugurated by the Minister of State-Owned Enterprises Rini Soemarno at Bandung Station on 6 April 2019. The Bandung Station co-working space is equipped with a table and chairs and is connected to the internet via Wi-Fi.

On 28 September 2022, KAI has started testing boarding services using the facial recognition system at the station, before it is planned to be used at all stations in Indonesia.

=== Signaling ===
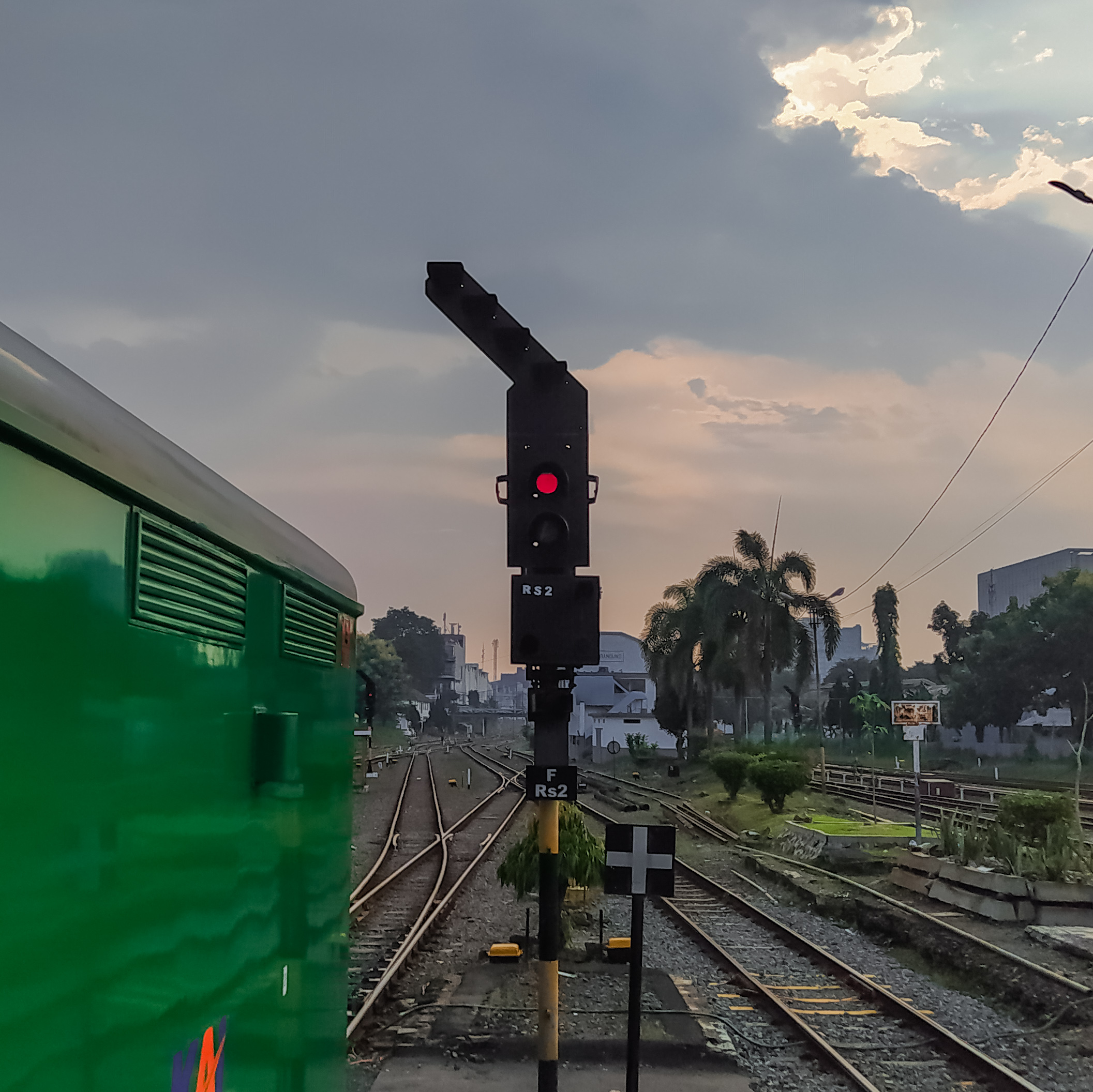
The exit signal made by Siemens on the west of Bandung Station yard has now been replaced with a new signal made by Len Industri

Bandung Station was the first railway station in Indonesia to use an electric signaling system. In 1970, the station began using the Siemens-produced DrS60 series. In December 2021, as part of the signaling modernization efforts, the old system was replaced with a new signal produced by PT Len Industri. This was made because the old system had been used for 50 years. At the same time, the track between Bandung and Ciroyom stations is rebuilt as a double track.

== Services ==
The following is a list of train services at the Bandung Station

=== Passenger services ===
Intercity trains

- Argo Parahyangan from and to Gambir
- Argo Wilis from and to Surabaya Gubeng
- Harina from and to Surabaya Pasar Turi via Semarang Tawang
- Lodaya from and to Solo Balapan
- Malabar from and to Malang
- Mutiara Selatan from and to Surabaya Gubeng
- Turangga from and to Surabaya Gubeng
- Ciremai from and to Semarang Tawang
- Sangkuriang from and to Ketapang
- Baturraden Express from and to Purwokerto via Tasikmalaya
- Pangandaran to Banjar and Gambir
- Papandayan to Gambir and Garut
- Cikuray to Pasar Senen and Garut

Local/commuter trains

- Commuter Line Bandung Raya to Padalarang/Purwakarta and Cicalengka
- Garut Commuter Line to Padalarang/Purwakarta and Cibatu/Garut
- HSR Feeder Train to Padalarang

=== Freight services ===
- Over Night Services to and from Surabaya Kota via Tasikmalaya–Lempuyangan–Madiun–Jombang

== Supporting transportation ==
Passengers who arrive on the station will find that Bandung station is easily accessible, and public transportation can be widely found in surrounding areas. Taxis can be found at the northern part of the station. Taxis wait in the parking lot for passenger pickup.

Public transportation (Angkot) is more widely available with routes that carry passengers to destinations throughout the city. It can be found in both the northern part or the southern part of the station. Besides that, Ojek (motorcycle taxi) can be found outside the station complex.

=== North building ===
Public transportation type	Route number	Route	Last destination
Trans Metro Bandung (BRT)	K6F	Bandung Station–Gunung Batu	Bandung Station bus terminal
Trans Metro Pasundan (BRT)		Baleendah–Bandung Electronic Center	Bandung Electronic Center
Angkot	11B	Bandung Station–Ciumbuleuit via Cihampelas	Bandung Station bus terminal
Angkot	11B	Bandung Station–Ciumbuleuit via Cihampelas	Dr. M. Salamun Ciumbuleuit Air Force Hospital
Angkot	12	Bandung Station–Gedebage	Bandung Station bus terminal
Angkot	13	Bandung Station–Sarijadi	Bandung Station bus terminal
Angkot	13	Bandung Station–Sarijadi	Sarijadi vertical housing (rusun)
Angkot	14	Bandung Station–Gunung Batu	Bandung Station bus terminal
Angkot	17	Caringin market–Dago	Caringin market
Angkot	22	Sukajadi–Kebon Kalapa	–
Angkot	26	Cisitu–Tegalega	Cisitu Indah
Angkot	26	Cisitu–Tegalega	Tegalega bus terminal
Angkot	30	Kebon Kalapa–Elang via Pasar Baru	Abdul Muis bus terminal
Angkot	31	Antapani–Ciroyom	Near the access to Husein Sastranegara International Airport
Angkot	34	Caringin–Sadang Serang	Near the access to the Cibaduyut Shoe Center
Angkot	35	Kebon Kalapa–Karang Setra	Historical house of Inggit Garnasih
Angkot	–	Bandung Station–Cimahi–Padalarang	Bandung Station bus terminal
Angkot	–	Bandung Station–Cimahi–Padalarang	Antri Baru market
Angkot	–	Bandung Station–Cimahi–Padalarang	Tagog Padalarang market
Angkot	–	Ciroyom–Ciburial	Ciroyom bus terminal
Angkot	–	Bandung Station–Lembang	Bandung Station bus terminal
Angkot	–	Bandung Station–Lembang	Lembang bus terminal

=== South building ===
Public transportation type	Route number	Route	Last destination
Trans Metro Bandung (BRT)	K2	Cicaheum–Cibeureum	Cicaheum bus terminal
Trans Metro Bandung (BRT)	K5	Antapani–Bandung Station	Antapani bus terminal
Trans Metro Bandung (BRT)	K6F	Bandung Station–Gunung Batu	–
Trans Metro Pasundan (BRT)		Kota Baru Parahyangan–Alun-alun Bandung	Bandung City Square (Alun-alun Kota Bandung)
Trans Metro Pasundan (BRT)	Trans Metro Pasundan	Leuwi Panjang–Dago	UNPAD
Angkot	11B	Bandung Station–Ciumbuleuit via Cihampelas	Bandung Station bus terminal
Angkot	11B	Bandung Station–Ciumbuleuit via Cihampelas	Dr. M. Salamun Ciumbuleuit Air Force Hospital
Angkot	12	Bandung Station–Gedebage	Gedebage bus terminal
Angkot	13	Bandung Station–Sarijadi	Sarjadi vertical housing (rusun)
Angkot	14	Bandung Station–Gunung Batu	Bandung Station bus terminal
Angkot	26	Cisitu–Tegalega	Cisitu Indah
Angkot	26	Cisitu–Tegalega	Tegalega bus terminal
Angkot	30	Kebon Kalapa–Elang via Pasar Baru	Abdul Muis bus terminal
Angkot	–	Bandung Station–Padalarang	Antri Baru market
Angkot	–	Bandung Station–Padalarang	Tagog Padalarang market
Angkot	–	Bandung Station–Lembang	Lembang bus terminal

=== East building ===
Public transport type	Route number	Route	Last destination
Trans Metro Bandung (BRT)	K2	Cicaheum–Cibereum	Cicaheum bus terminal
Trans Metro Bandung (BRT)	K5	Antapani–Bandung Station	Antapani bus terminal
Trans Metro Bandung (BRT)	K6F	Bandung Station–Gunung Batu	–
Trans Bandung Raya (Perum DAMRI)		Kota Baru Parahyangan–Alun-alun Bandung (via Pasteur Toll Road)	–
Trans Metro Pasundan (BRT)		Baleendah–Bandung Electronic Center	Bandung Electronic Center
Angkot	9	Bandung Station–Dago	Dago bus terminal
Angkot	10	Bandung Station–Sadang Serang	Sadang Serang bus terminal
Angkot	11B	Bandung Station–Ciumbuleuit via Cihampelas	Bandung Station bus terminal
Angkot	11B	Bandung Station–Ciumbuleuit via Cihampelas	Dr. M. Salamun Ciumbuleuit Air Force Hospital
Angkot	13	Bandung Station–Sarijadi	Sarijadi vertical housing (rusun)
Angkot	14	Bandung Station–Gunug Batu	–
Angkot	22	Sukajadi–Kebon Kalapa	–
Angkot	26	Cisitu–Tegalega	Cisitu Indah
Angkot	30	Kebon Kalapa–Elang via Pasar Baru	–
Angkot	–	Bandung Station–Cimahi–Padalarang	Antri Baru market
Angkot	–	Bandung Station–Cimahi–Padalarang	Tagog Padalarang market
Angkot	–	Bandung Station–Lembang	Lembang bus terminal

== Gallery ==
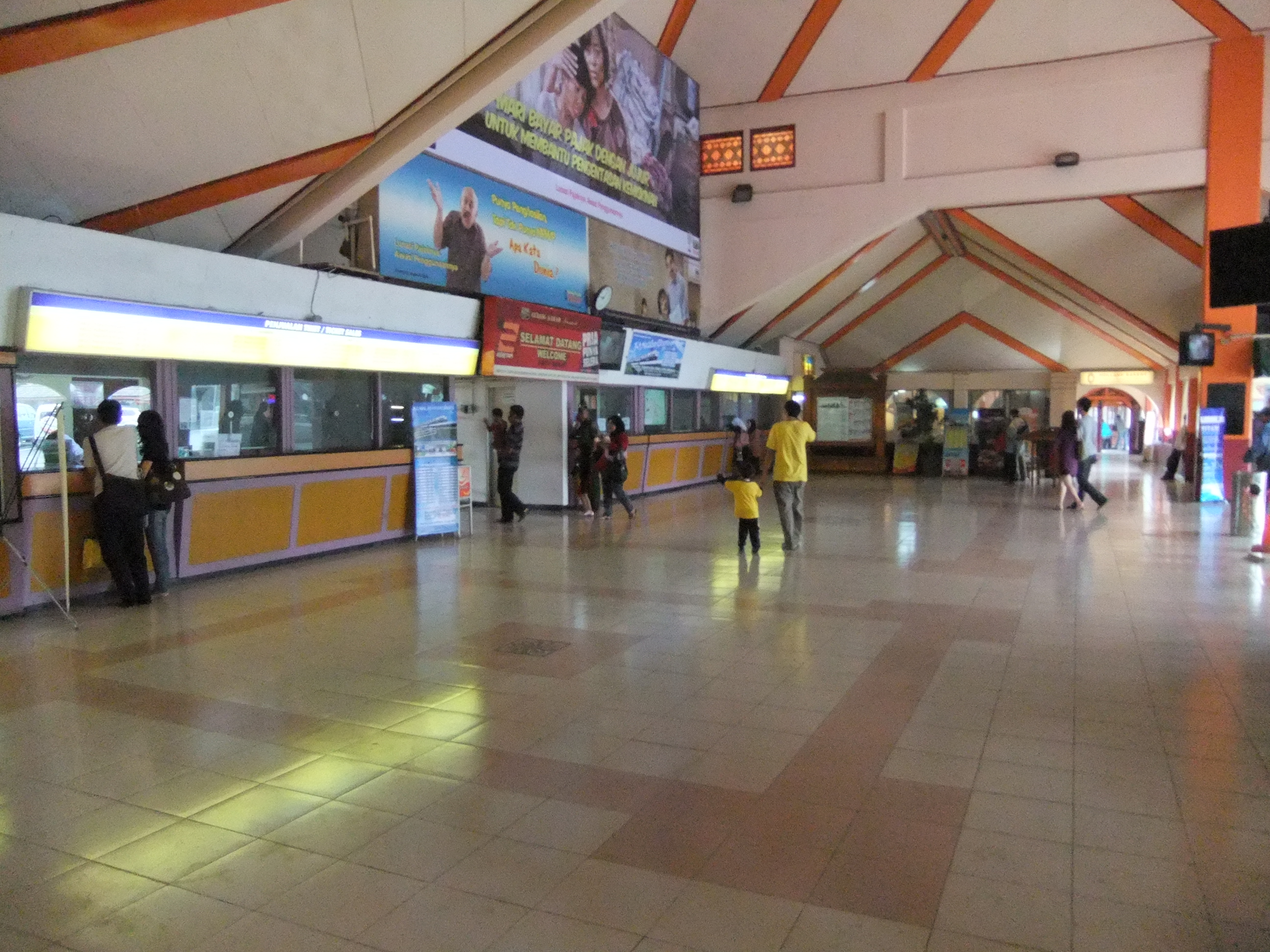
The interior of Bandung Station (2010)

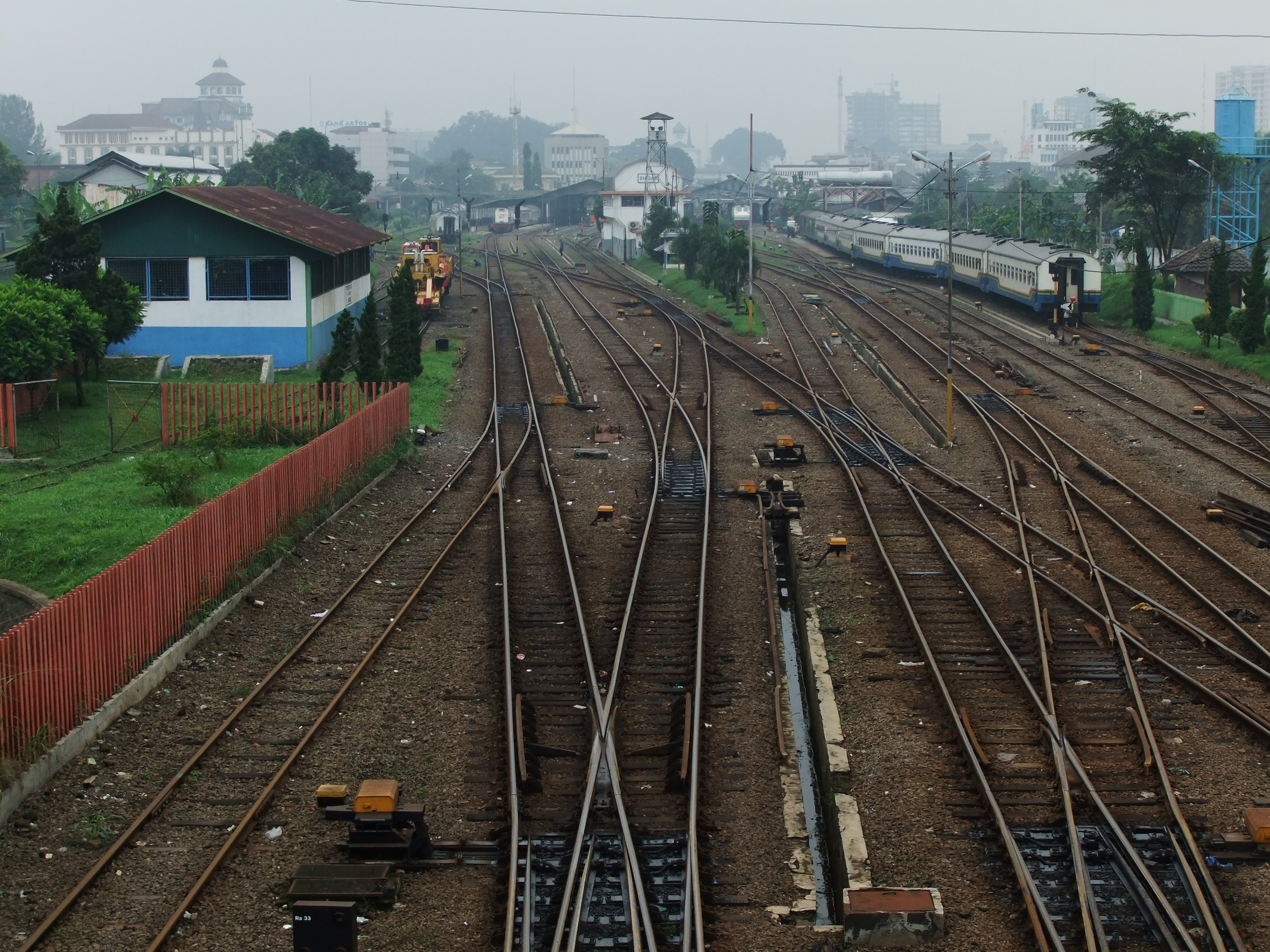
The railtracks of the station seen from the HOS Tjokroaminoto street

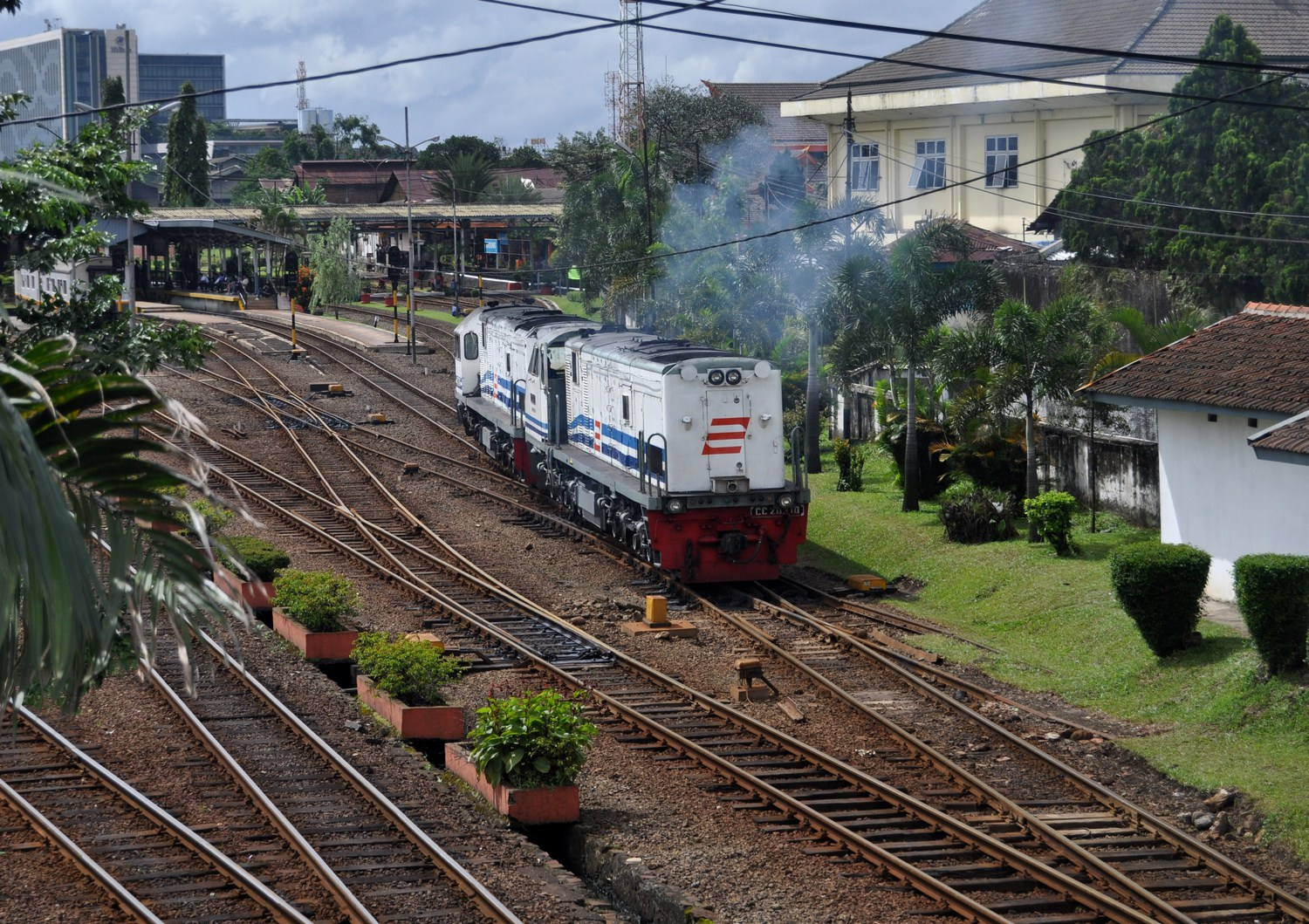
The Bandung Station seen from the east (2010)

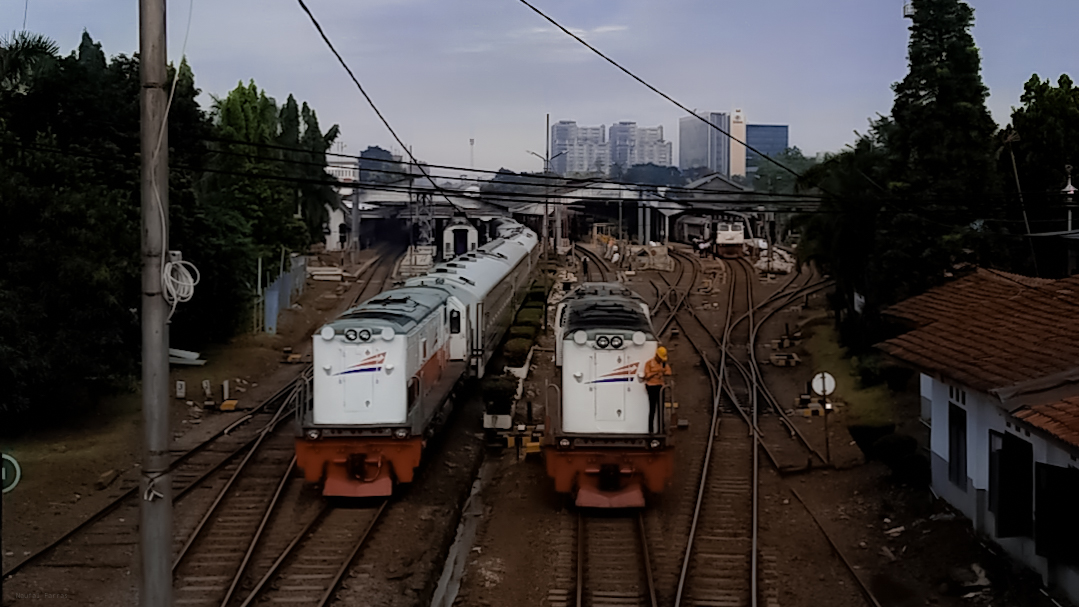
The Bandung Station seen from the east (2020)

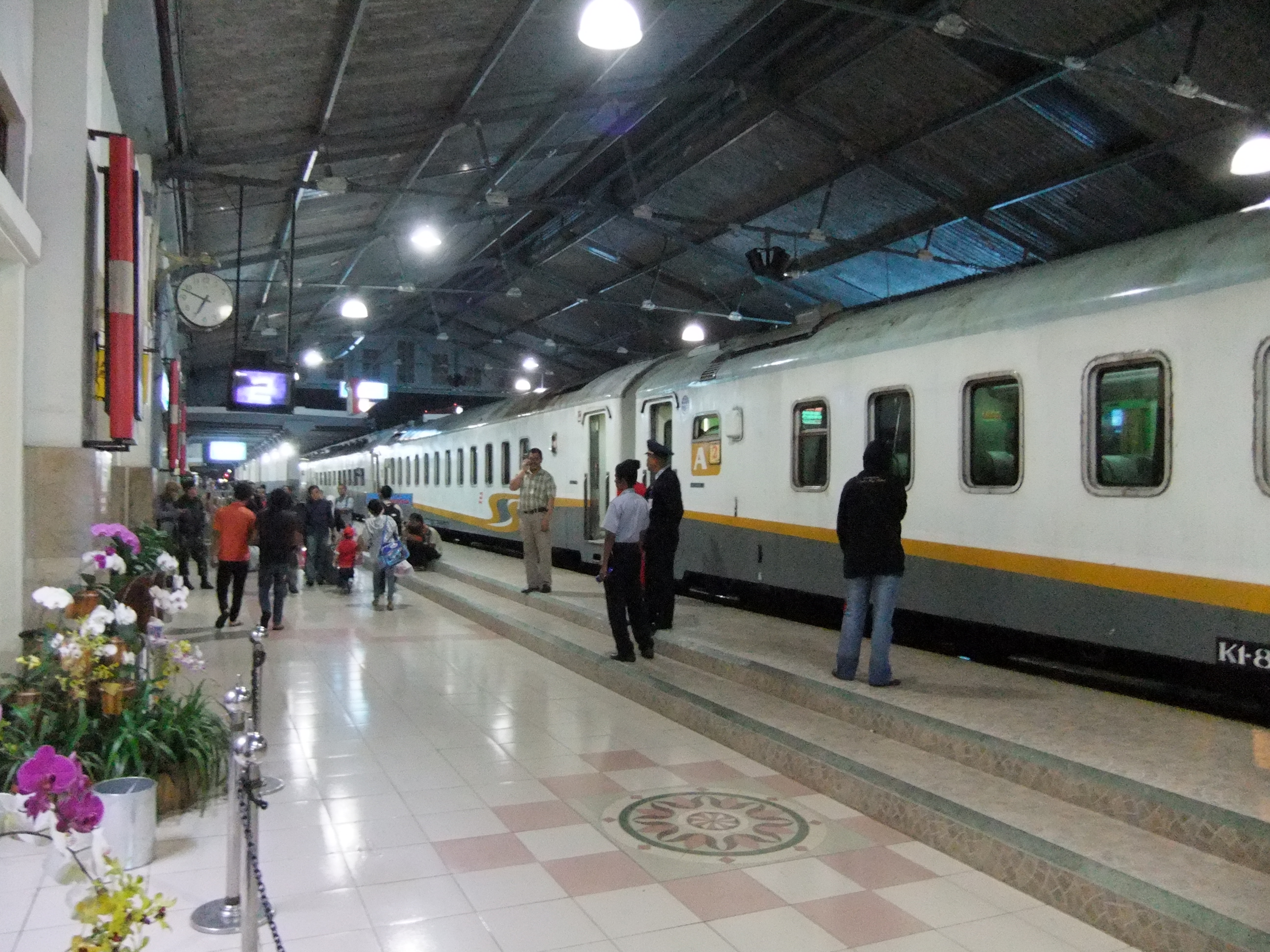
The south platform of the station

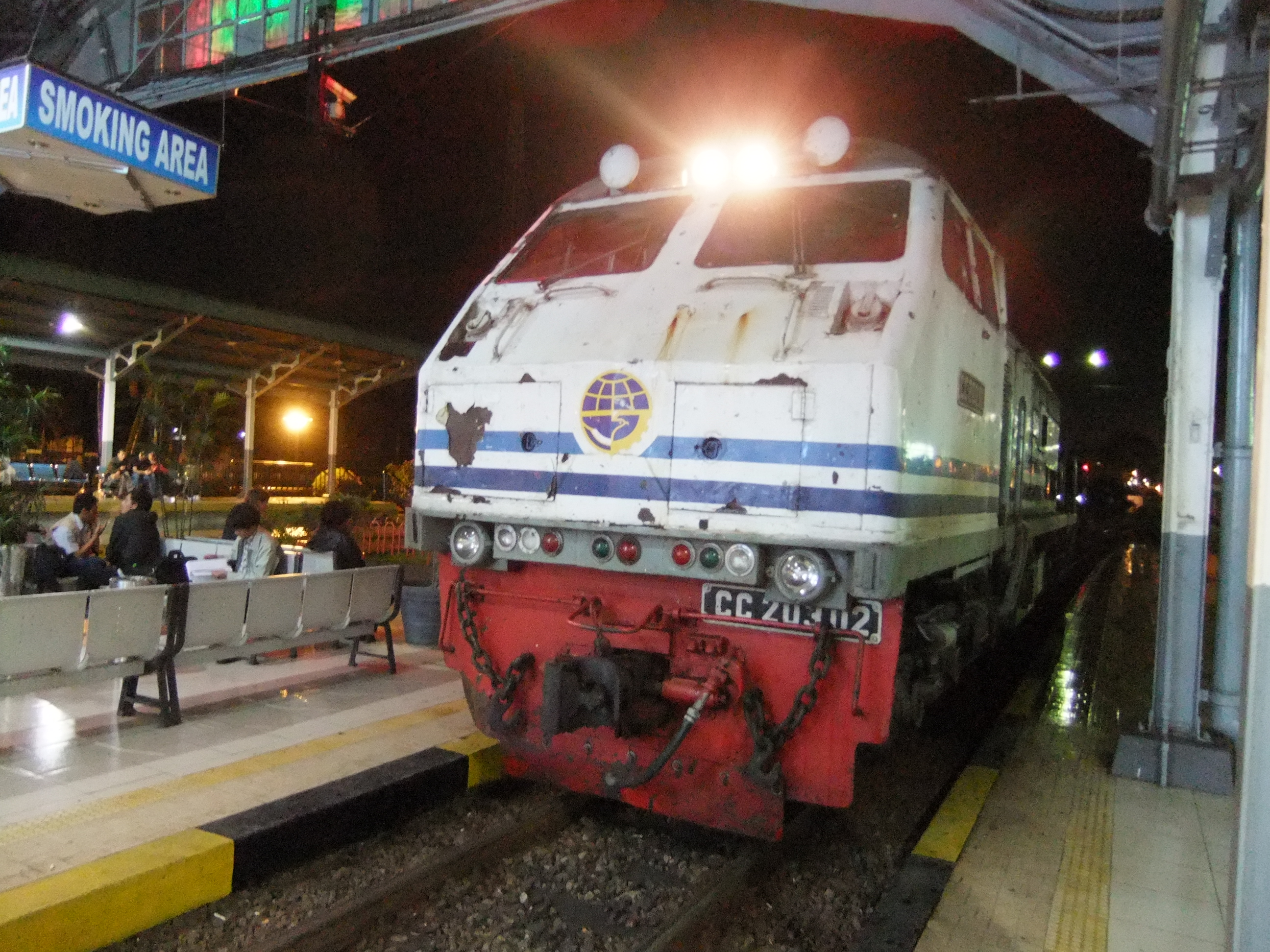
CC20302 locomotive train arriving at Bandung Station with the logo of Ministry of Transportation

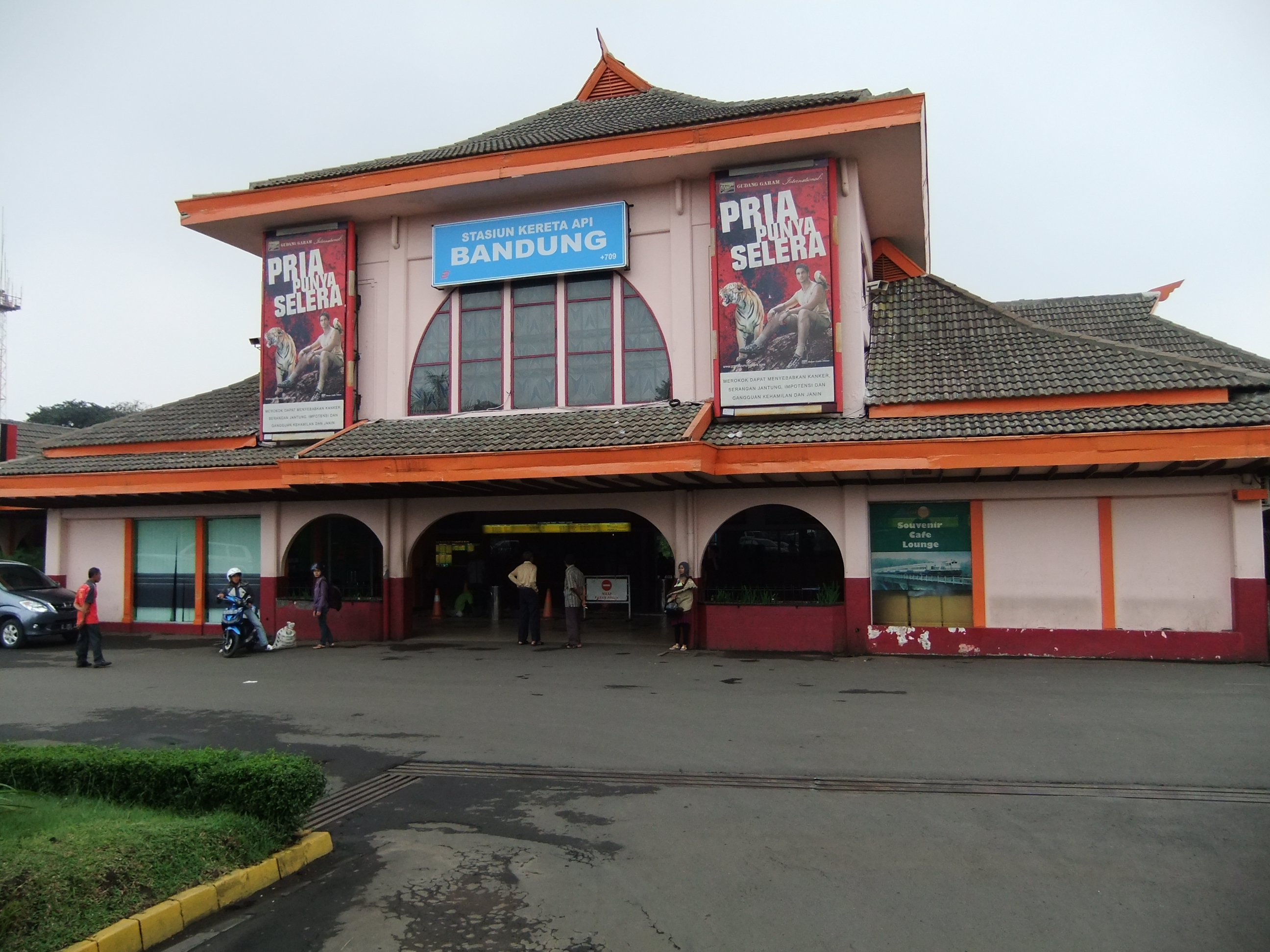
The front view of Bandung Station from the Jalan Kebon Kawung entrance

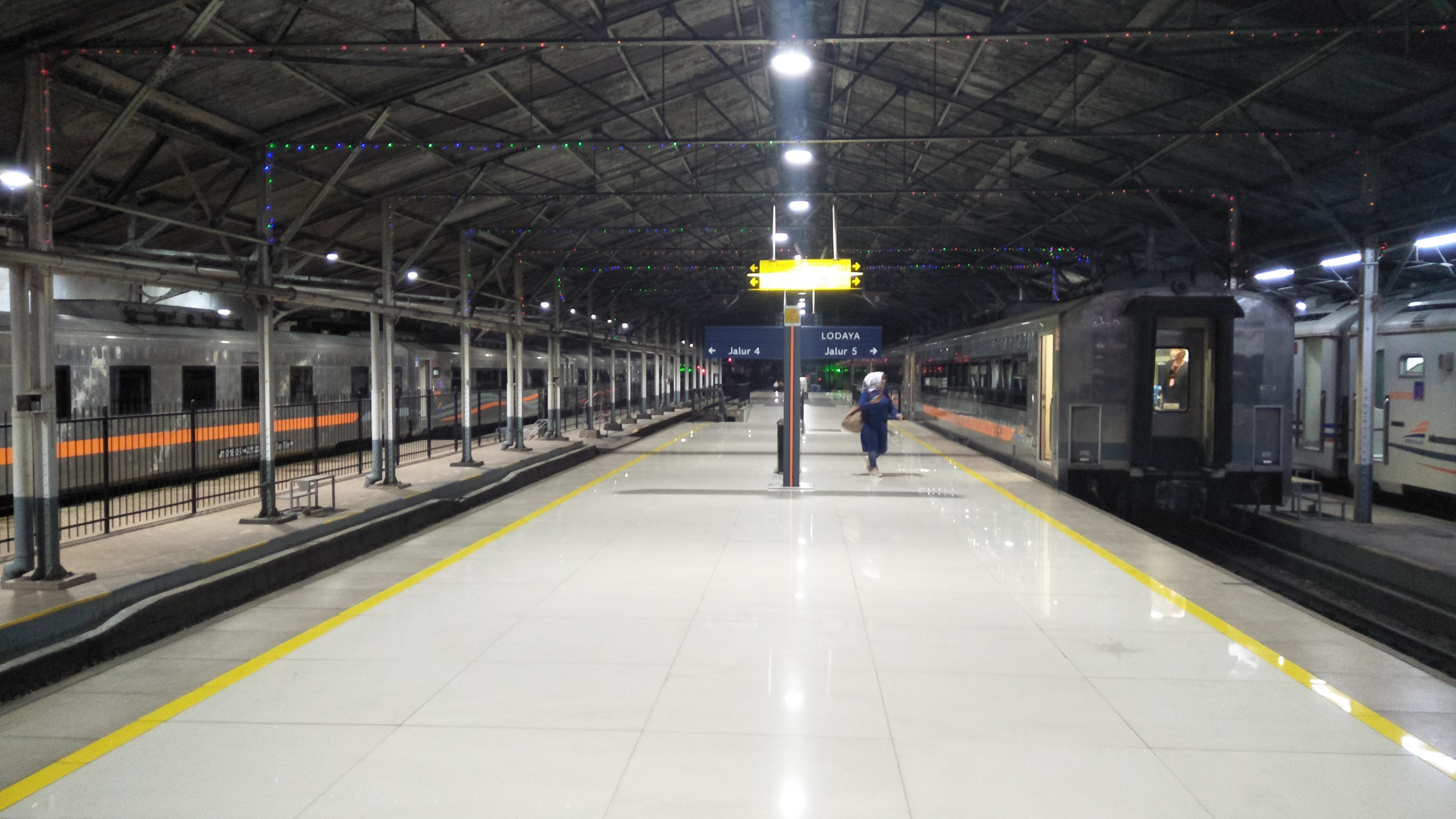
The platform between line 4 and 5 with the series of the Lodaya train

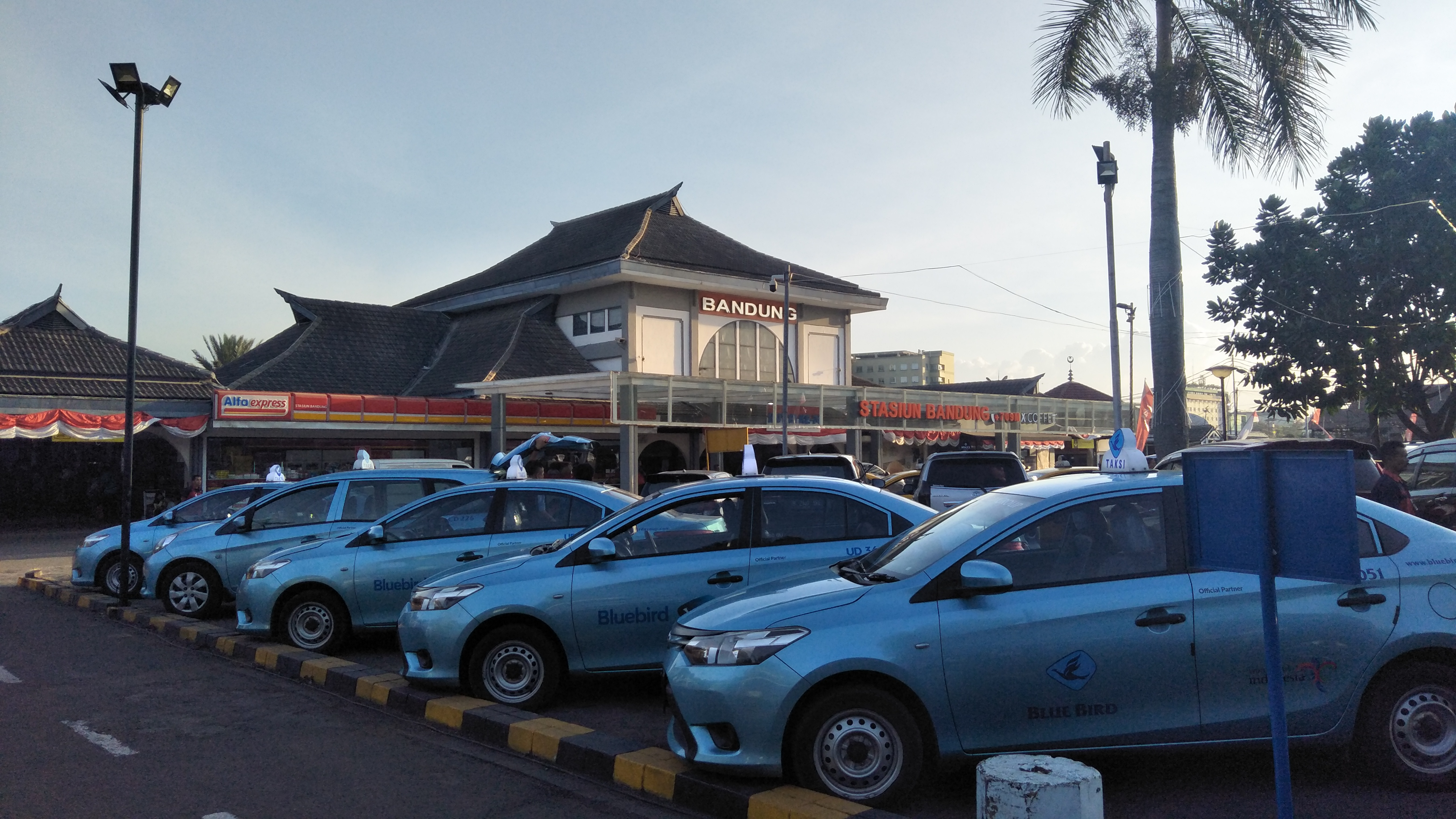
The taxi stand on the north entrance of the station

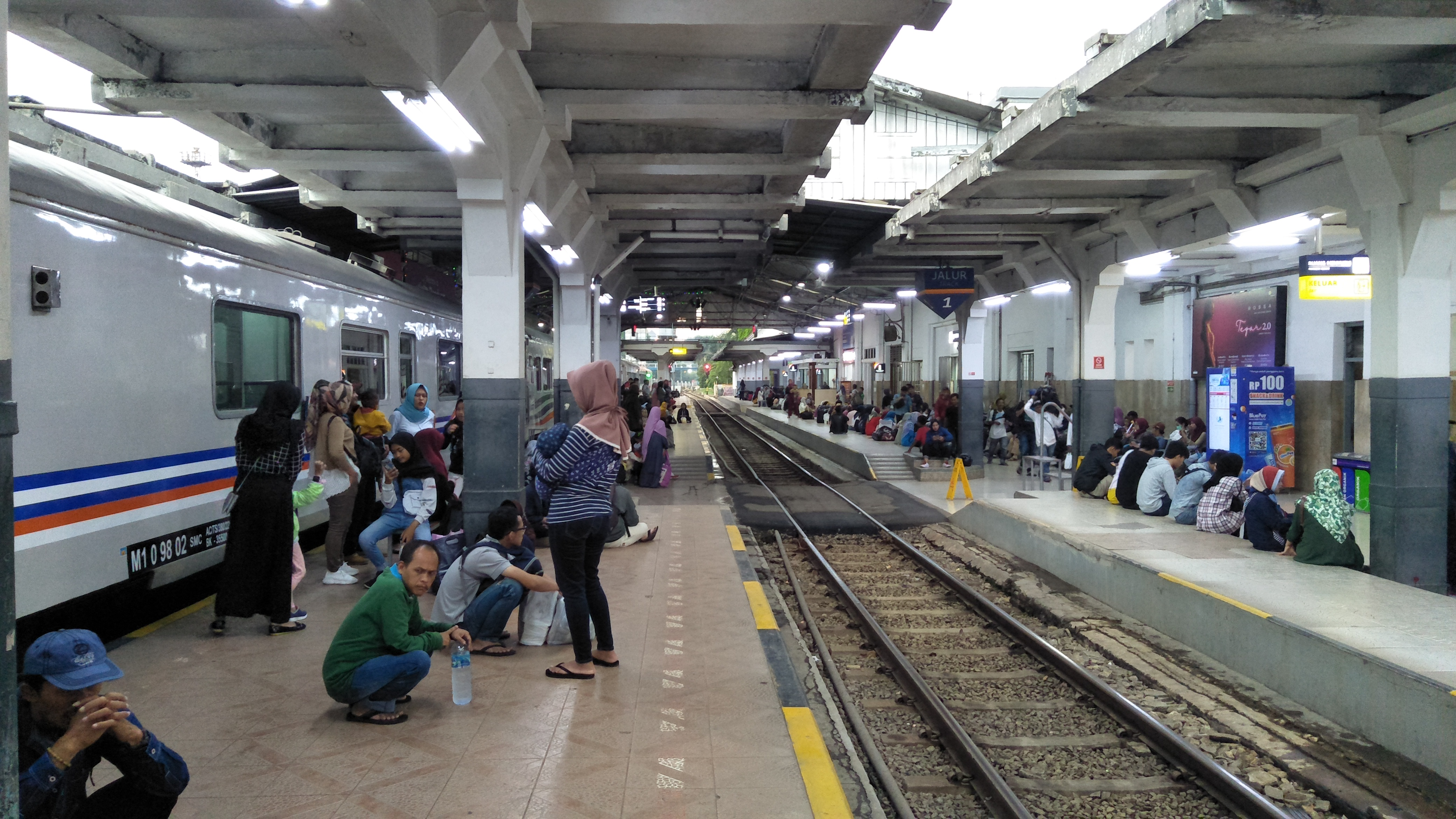
The south platform of the station filled with Greater Bandung Commuter Line passengers

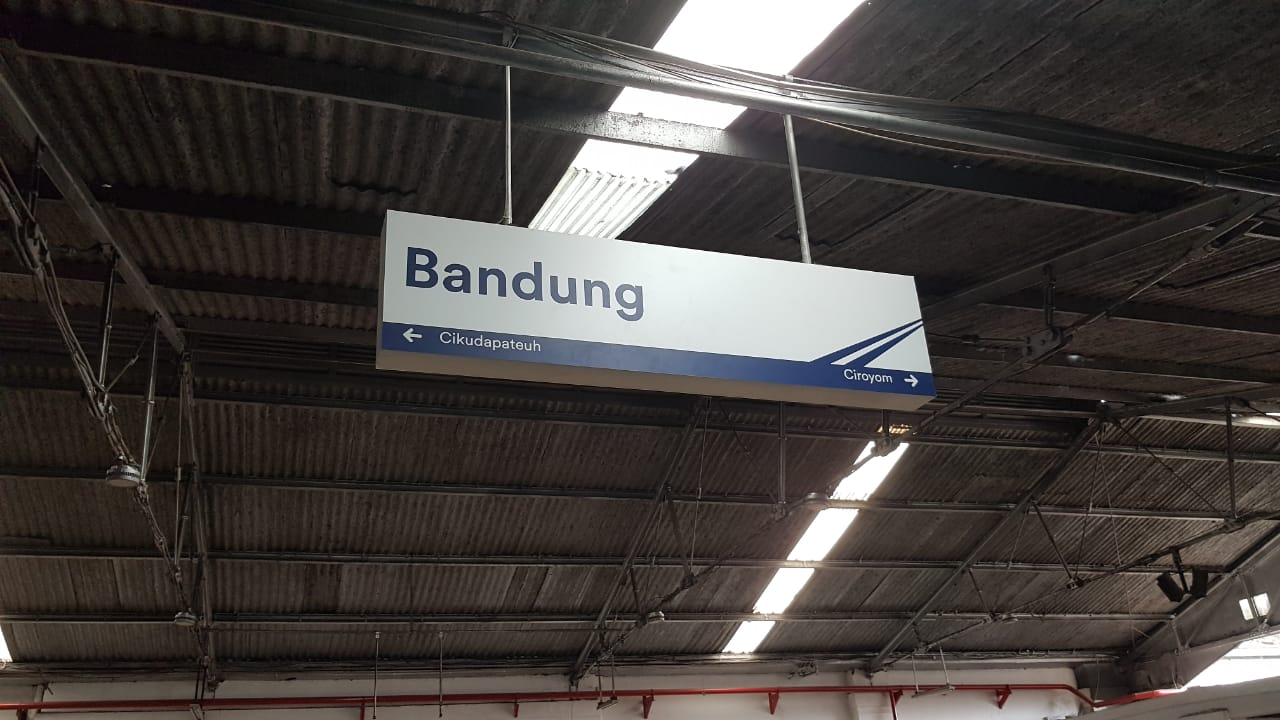
The current version (2020) of the Bandung Station signage

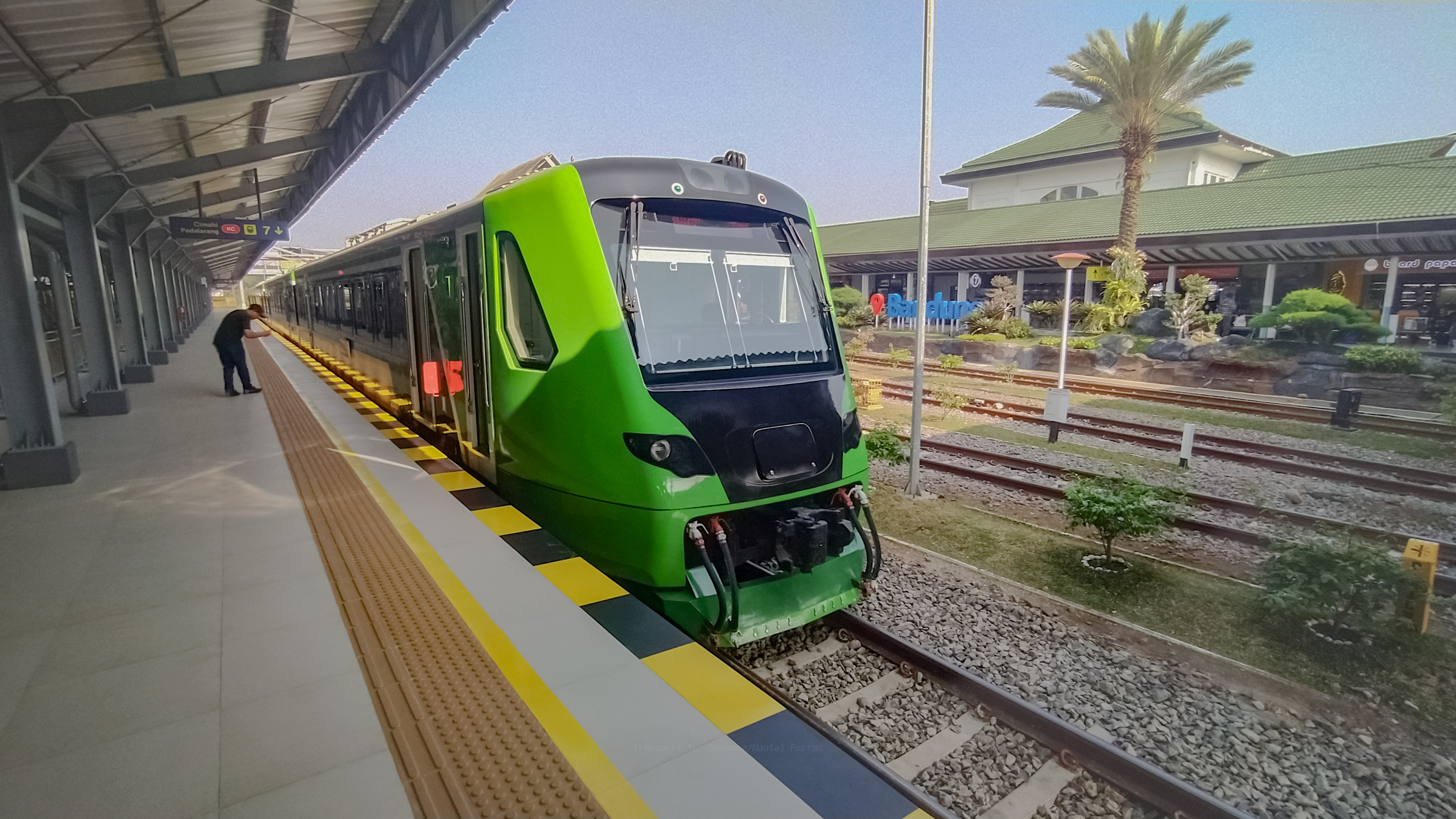
The Jakarta–Bandung HSR Feeder Train at Bandung Station towards Padalarang

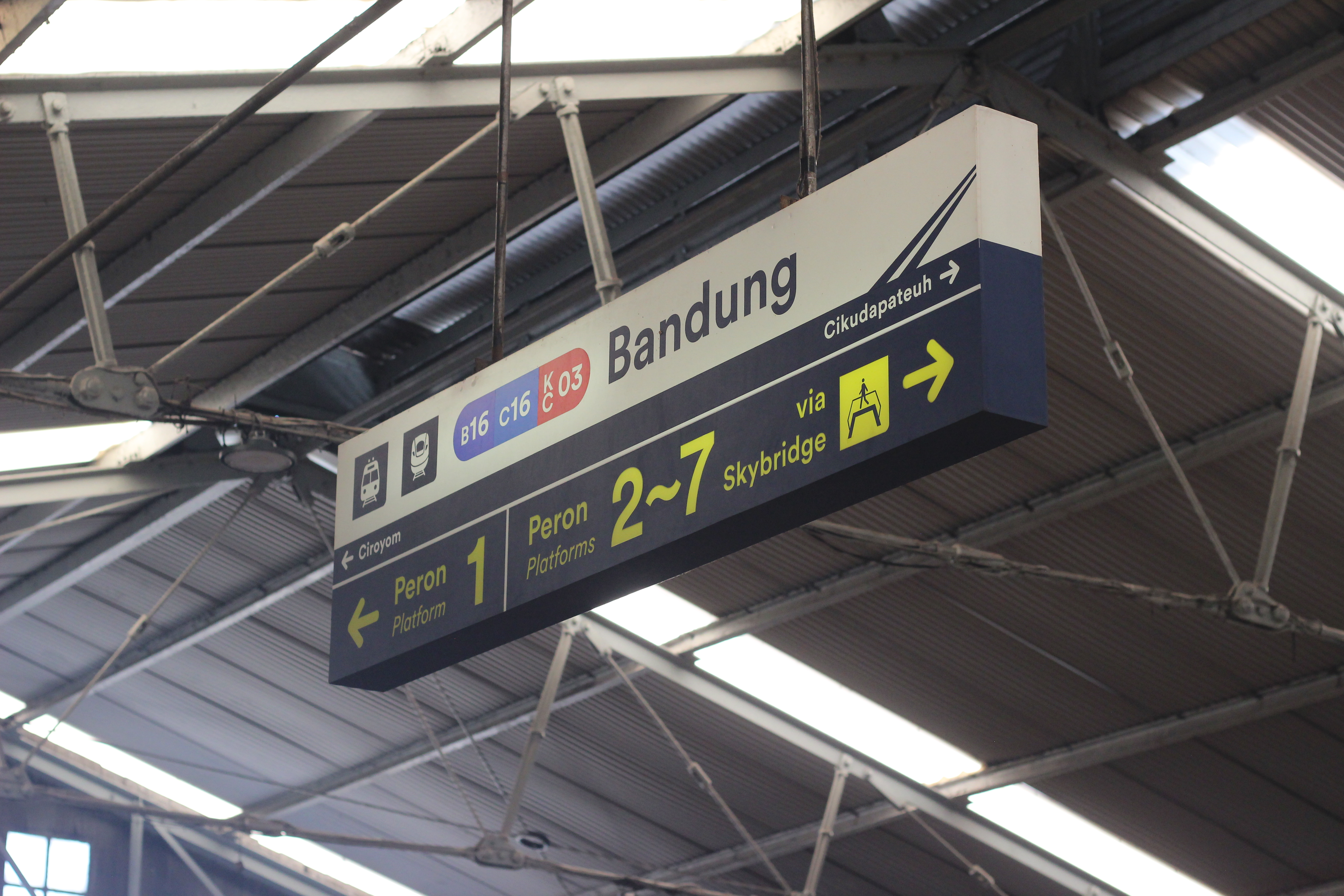
Bandung Station signage spotted in Platform 1 as of 2026. Note the presence of Station numbering.

Preceding station	Kereta Api Indonesia	Following station
Ciroyom towards Padalarang	Padalarang–Kasugihan	Cikudapateuh towards Kasugihan
