= Ciroyom railway station =

Railway station in Indonesia

Ciroyom Station Stasiun Ciroyom
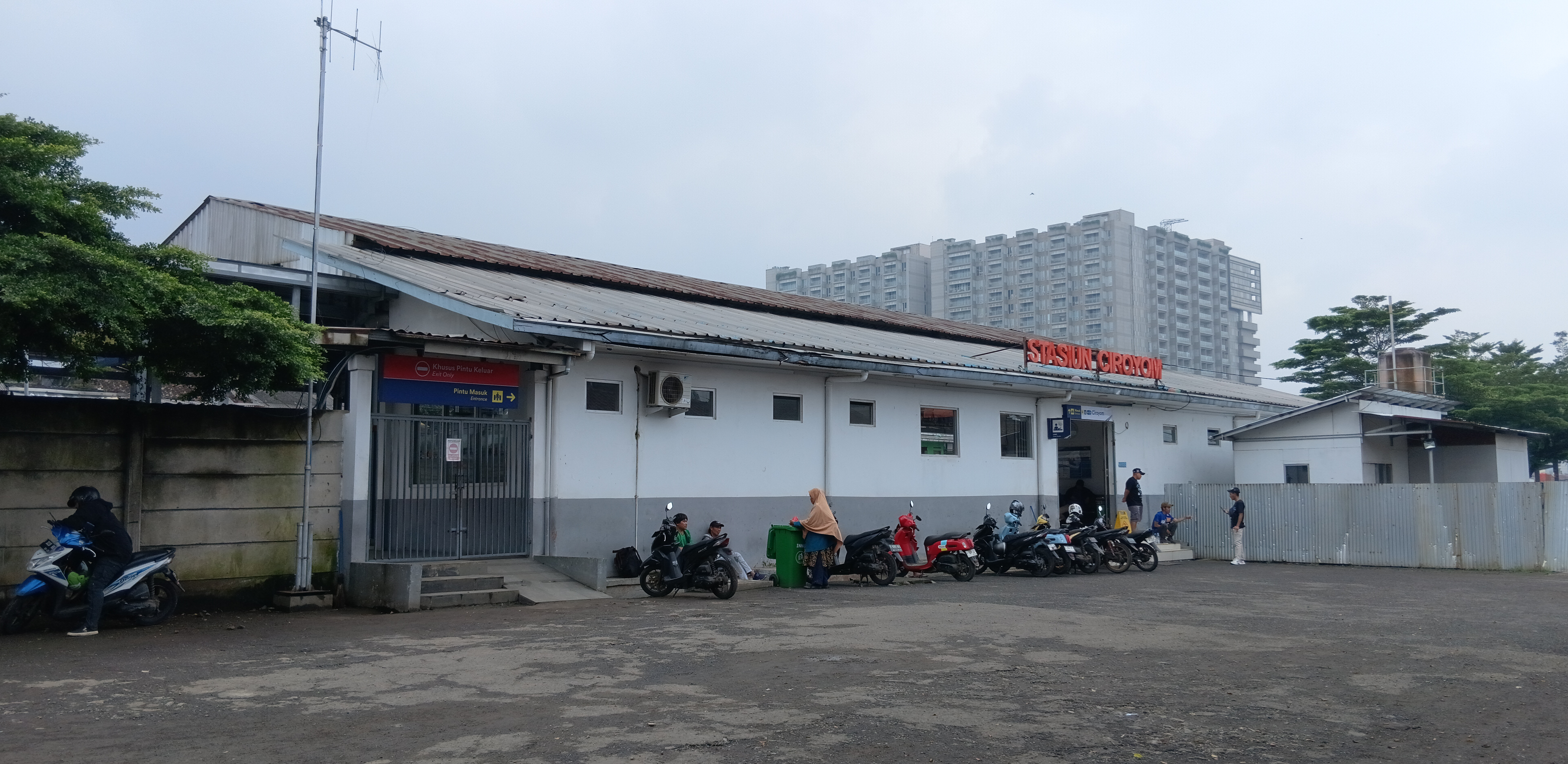
- Ciroyom Station exterior in 2025

General information
- Location: Bandung, West Java, Indonesia
- Coordinates: 6°54′51″S 107°35′25″E
- Elevation: +709 m (2,326 ft)
- Owner: Kereta Api Indonesia
- Operator: Kereta Api Indonesia
- Line: Padalarang–Kasugihan
- Platforms: 1 side platform 2 island platforms
- Tracks: 5

Construction
- Structure type: Ground
- Parking: Available
- Accessible: Available

Other information
- Station code: CIR
- Classification: Class II

History
- Opened: 17 May 1884
Location
- Location within Bandung

Ciroyom Station is a railway station that located near Arjuna street at Andir, Bandung. The station located just on the east side of Ciroyom traditional market.

The station also located only 500 meters on the west side of Bandung Station.

== Services ==
There are only a few train stop in this station :

- Greater Bandung Commuter Line to Purwakarta, Padalarang, and Cicalengka
- Garut Commuter Line to Garut and Purwakarta

Preceding station	Kereta Api Indonesia	Following station
Andir towards Padalarang	Padalarang–Kasugihan	Bandung towards Kasugihan
