= Ijo railway tunnel =

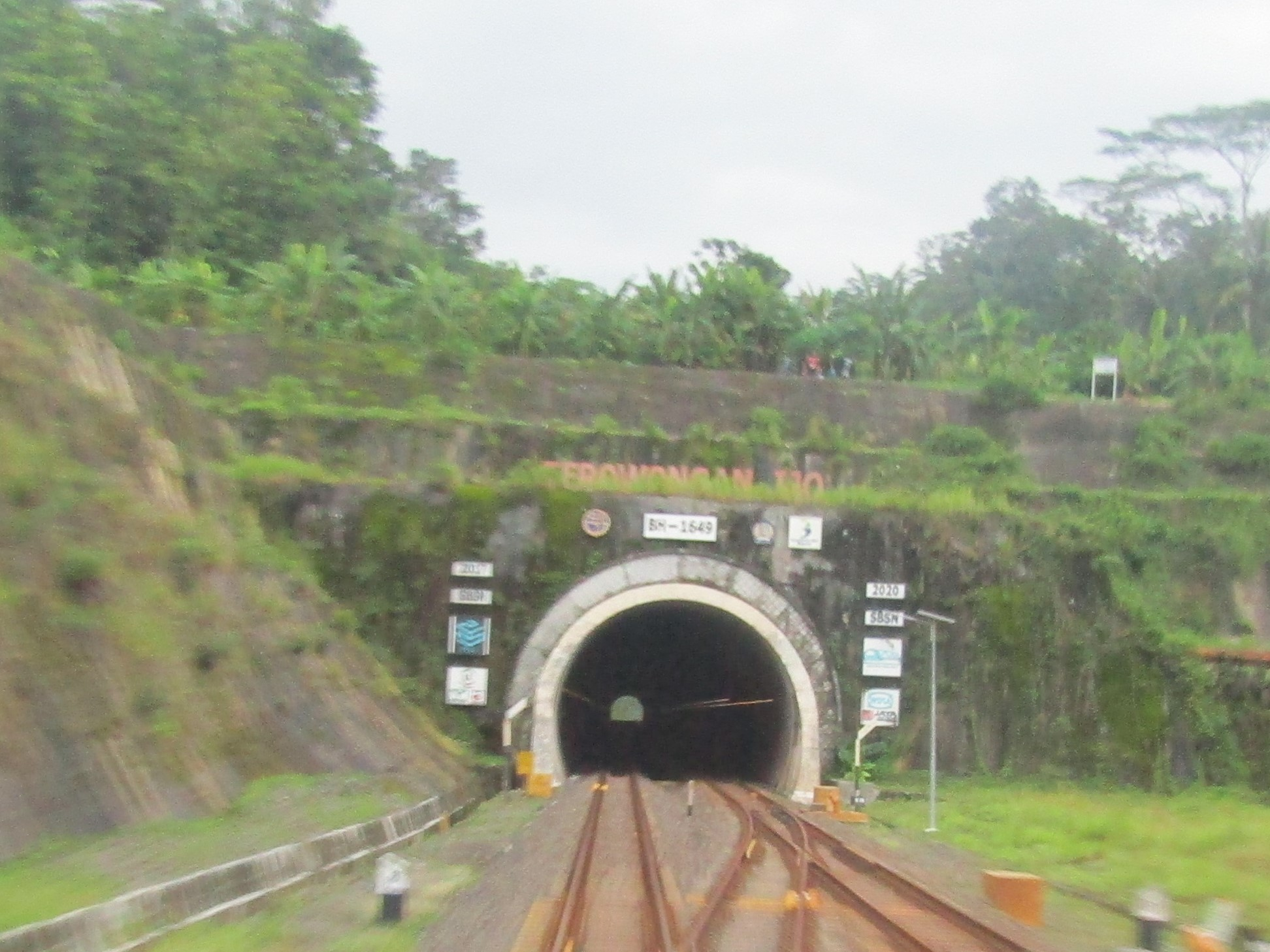
- New Ijo railway tunnel in 2024
- Interactive map of Ijo railway tunnel

Overview
- Location: Ijo, Bumiagung, Rowokele, Kebumen Regency, Central Java
- Status: active
- Route: Kroya - Yogyakarta
- Crosses: Cilacap - Yogyakarta railway line
- Start: (km 425+861)
- End: (km 426+441)
- No. of stations: Ijo railway station

Operation
- Work began: 1885 (old); 2017 (new)
- Constructed: 1885 (old); 2017 (new)
- Opens: 1886 (old railway tunnel), 2020 (new railway tunnel)
- Closed: 2020 (old railway tunnel)
- Owner: Kereta Api Indonesia

Technical
- Length: 580 m (1,900 ft)
- Track gauge: 1067 mm

Ijo railway tunnel is an railway tunnel that neared by the eastern of Ijo and build by the Staatsspoorwegen (SS) between 1885 and 1886 for old railway tunnel, build by the DJKA between 2017 and 2020 for new railway tunnel. This tunnel a long as far as 347 m and is located in Bumiagung, Rowokele, Kebumen. This tunnel penetrates the karst limestone hills of Mount Malang at the northern tip of the South Gombong Karst Area.

There are two tunnels, namely the old Ijo tunnel which is on the single track route and the new Ijo tunnel which is on the double track route. This Ijo tunnel is the only railway tunnel in Indonesia that uses a system technology using a slab track system, aka concrete sleepers embedded in concrete cement casting. The Ijo tunnel is known as a tunnel with very high traffic with dense crossings and overtaking and was once used as a shooting location for the films Kereta Api Terakhir and Daun di Atas Bantal. This tunnel has a building number of wisdom 1649.

== History ==
=== Single track Ijo railway tunnel (1887-2020) ===
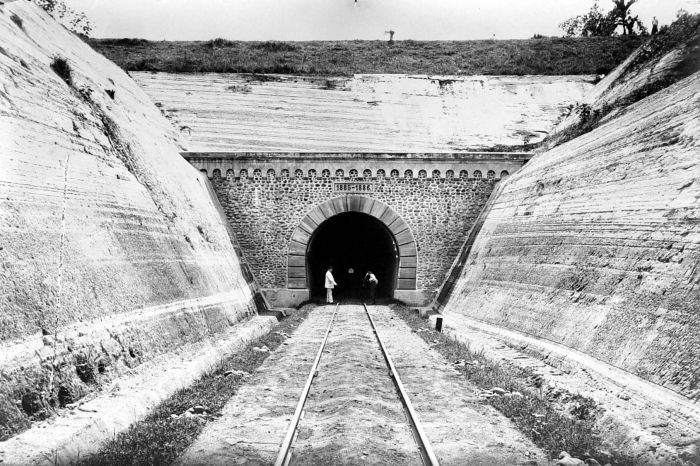
Old Ijo railway tunnel

The construction of the southern Java railway was the first railway line project undertaken by the Staatsspoorwegen (SS). This line would connect Bogor with Yogyakarta. One of the projects was the Cilacap–Kroya–Yogyakarta railway, which began in 1885 and was completed on 20 July 1887. Due to the limestone hills west of Gombong's obstacles, a 580-meter-long tunnel was constructed. This railway tunnel was later named Ijo, with construction beginning in 1885 and completed in 1886, following the year displayed above the tunnel's rim.

=== Double track Ijo railway tunnel (2020-Present) ===
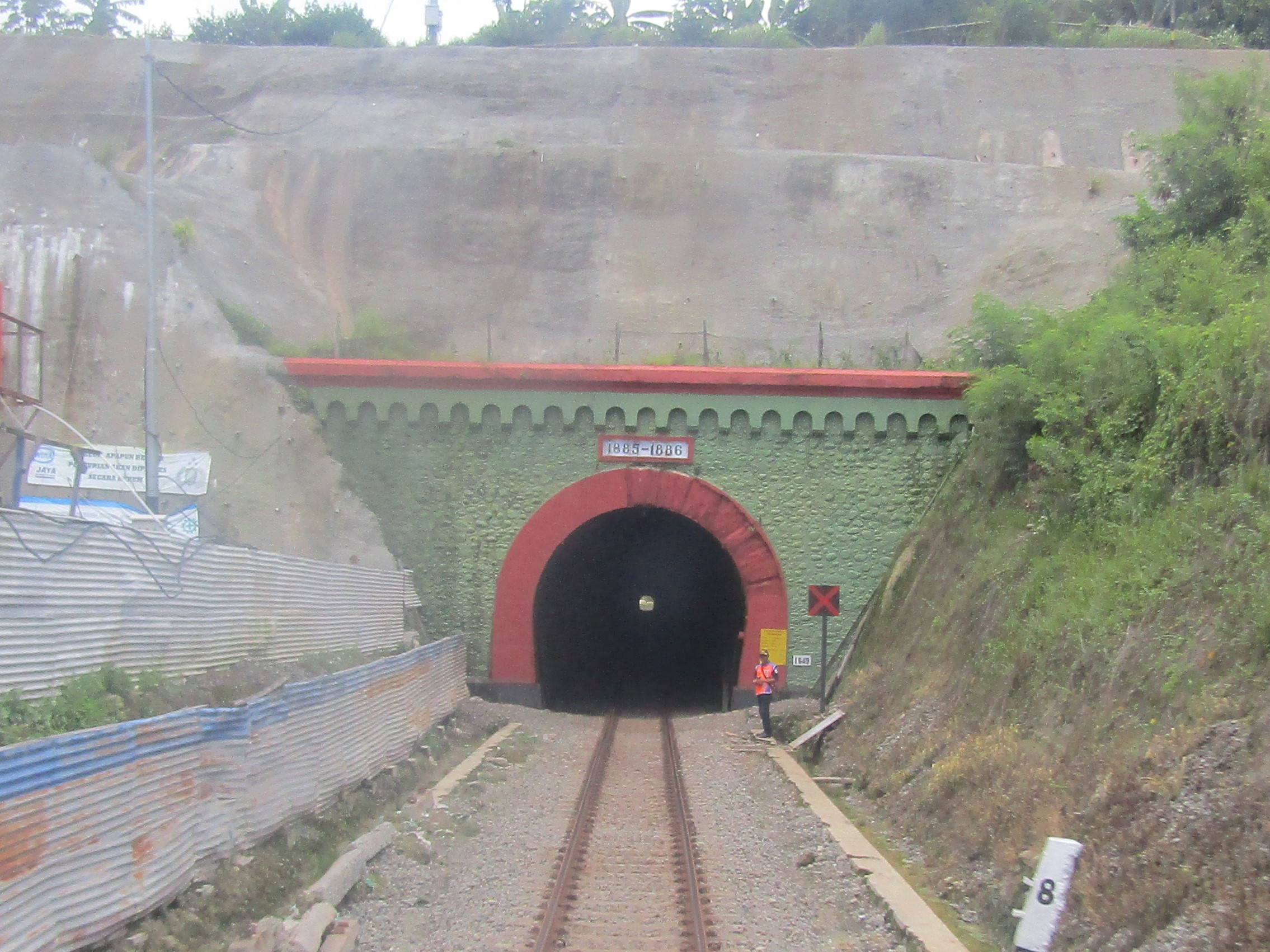
Old Ijo railway tunnel before closed, 2020

The construction of the Purwokerto–Kroya–Kutoarjo double track line will connect the existing double track lines, namely Cirebon–Purwokerto and Kutoarjo–Solo Balapan. The construction of the double track line faced many obstacles due to the tunnel only being able to accommodate a single track, so the Directorate General of Railways (DJKA) decided to build a new tunnel. DJKA decided to build this new tunnel by engaging two contractors, Wijaya Karya (Wika) and Jaya Konstruksi. The construction was coordinated by the South Java Line Development Work Unit section 2 (PLS 2 Satker) which was formed by the Central Java Railway Engineering Center (now BTP Semarang).

New Ijo railway tunnel that located north of the old railway tunnel. The new railway tunnel is 581 m long and 9 m in diameter and can accommodate two train lines at once. Both lines are slab tracks, where the rail lines are tied with concrete sleepers embedded in a cast concrete foundation without any ballast/kricak at all. In addition, a new Ijo Station was also built to replace the old Ijo Station. Since 21 April 2020, the new railway tunnel and station have been partially activated and can only be fully used since 5 May 2020, along with the activation of the Kroya-Kutoarjo double track, while the old railway tunnel and station have been deactivated and made a cultural heritage.

== Technical Data ==
Railway tunnel data
length	580 m (new) 581 m (old)
Built	1885-1886 (old) 2017-2020 (new)
Located	km 425+861 - km 426+441

== Service ==
Trains that enter the tunnel:

=== Executive class ===
- Taksaka, between Gambir and Yogyakarta
- Argo Dwipangga, between Gambir and Solo Balapan
- Argo Lawu, between Gambir and Solo Balapan
- Argo Wilis, between Bandung and Surabaya Gubeng
- Argo Semeru, between Gambir and Surabaya Gubeng
- Bima, between Gambir and Surabaya Gubeng
- Manahan, between Gambir and Solo Balapan
- Gajayana, between Gambir and Malang
- Turangga, between Bandung and Surabaya Gubeng

=== Mixed class ===
- Fajar and Senja Utama Yogya, between Pasar Senen and Yogyakarta (executive class, priority class, and premium economy class)
- Fajar and Senja Utama Solo, between Pasar Senen and Solo Balapan (executive class and premium economy class)
- Lodaya, between Bandung and Solo Balapan (executive class and premium economy class)
- Bangunkarta, between Pasar Senen and Jombang (executive class and economy plus class)
- Malabar, between Bandung and Malang (executive class, business class, and economy plus class)
- Mutiara Selatan, between Bandung and Surabaya Gubeng (executive class and premium economy class)
- Kertanegara, between Purwokerto and Malang (executive class and economy plus class)
- Malioboro Express, between Purwokerto and Malang (executive class and economy plus class)
- Ranggajati, between Cirebon via Yogyakarta-Purwokerto and Jember via Madiun-Jombang-Surabaya Gubeng (executive class and business class)
- Wijayakusuma, between Cilacap and Ketapang (executive class and premium economy class)
- Sancaka Utara, between Surabaya Pasar Turi and Cilacap (executive class and business class)
- Batavia train, between Gambir & Solo Balapan (executive and economy)
- Mataram, between Pasar Senen and Solo Balapan
- Gaya Baru Malam Selatan, Pasar Senen and Surabaya Gubeng
- Singasari, Pasar Senen and Blitar

=== Economy class ===
- Jayakarta, between Pasar Senen and Surabaya Gubeng
- Joglosemarkerto, loop line through Central Java and the Special Region of Yogyakarta via Purwokerto
- Logawa, between Purwokerto and Ketapang
- Progo, between Pasar Senen and Lempuyangan
- Bengawan, between Pasar Senen and Purwosari
- Jaka Tingkir, between Pasar Senen and Purwosari
- Kahuripan, between Kiaracondong and Blitar
- Pasundan, between Kiaracondong and Surabaya Gubeng
- Gajahwong, between Pasar Senen and Purwosari

=== Freight ===
- Overnight train Service, between Kampung Bandan and Malang (Central Parcel), between Surabaya Kota and Bandung (Southern Parcel)

== See also ==
- Cilacap–Kroya–Yogyakarta railway
