= Maos railway station =

Railway station in Indonesia

Maos Station Stasiun Maos
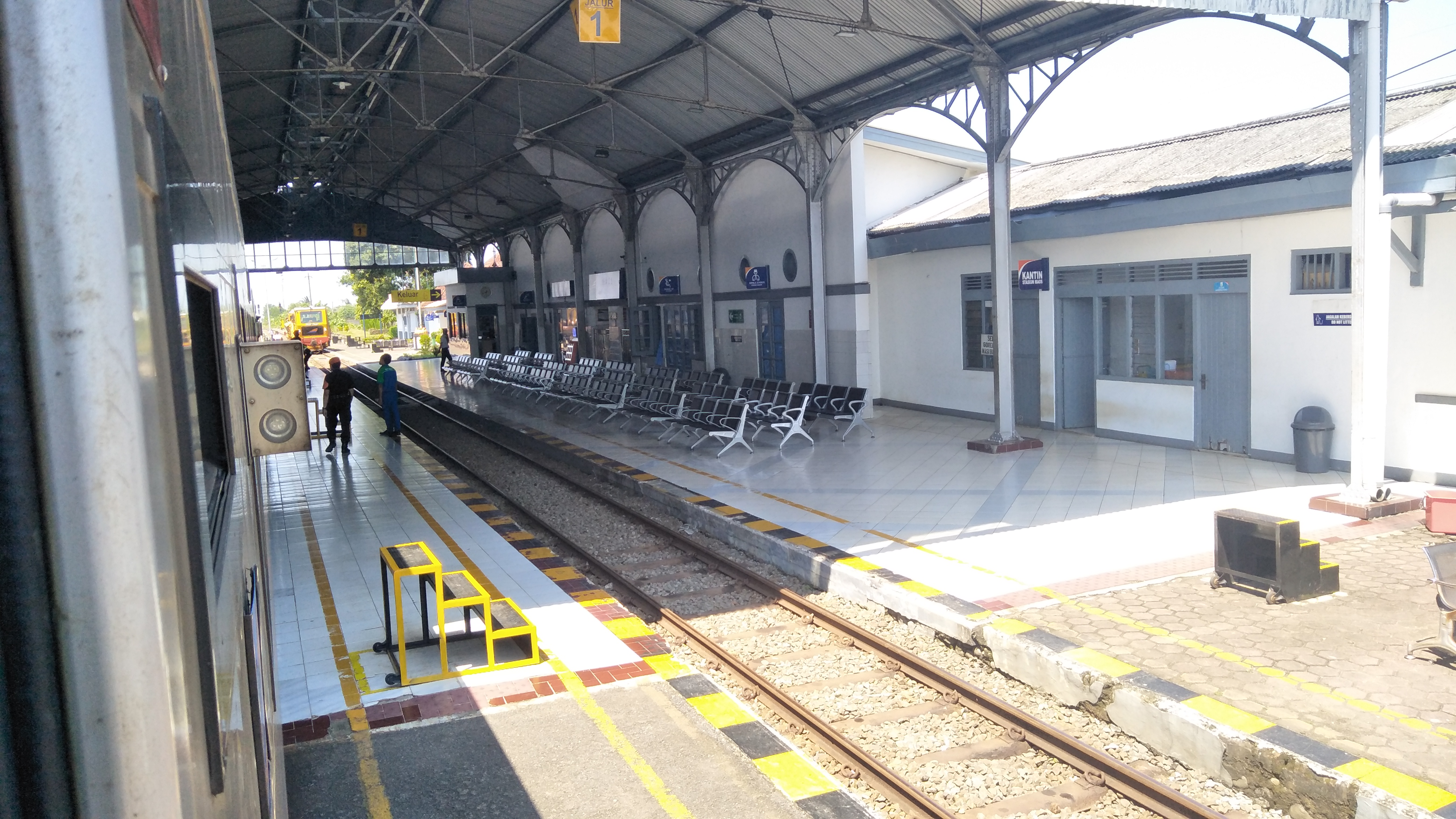
- Maos Station platform in 2019

General information
- Location: Jalan Stasiun Maos, Karangreja, Maos, Cilacap Regency, Central Java, Indonesia
- Coordinates: 7.6190643°S 109.139396°E
- Elevation: +8m
- Owner: Kereta Api Indonesia
- Manager: Kereta Api Indonesia
- Lines: Cilacap–Kroya; Maos–Purwokerto Timur (closed)
- Platforms: 1 side platform 3 island platforms
- Tracks: 7

Construction
- Parking: Available

Other information
- Station code: MA • 2016
- Classification: Large type C

History
- Opened: 20 July 1887
- Original company: Staatsspoorwegen
Location
- Location within Java

Maos Station (MA) is a large type C railway station located in Maos District, Cilacap Regency, Central Java, Indonesia. The station is located at an altitude of +8 meters and is operated by Operation Area V Purwokerto.

== History ==
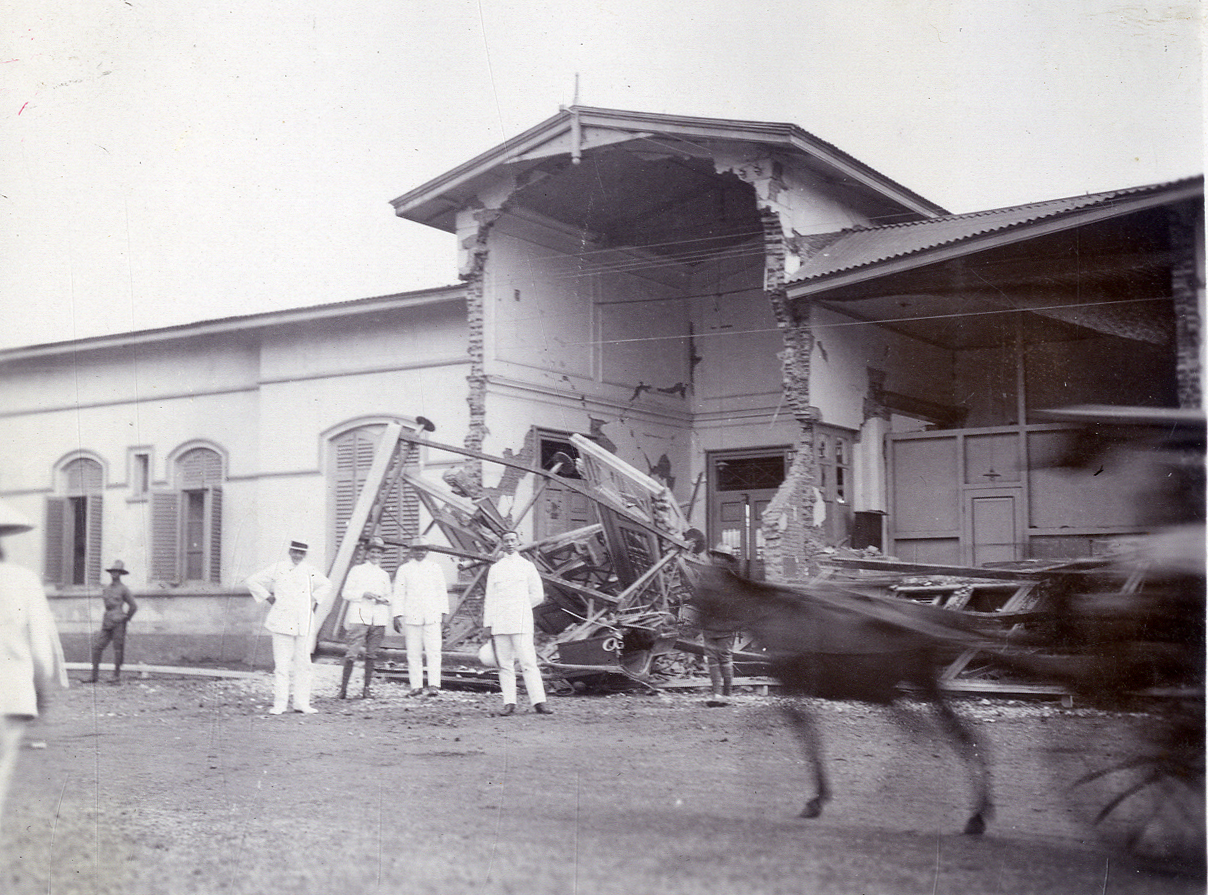
Collapsed old Maos Station façade

The station was built by Staatsspoorwegen and was opened on 20 July 1887, along with the opening of Cilacap–Kroya–Kutoarjo–Yogyakarta railway line.

The station building was initially built in Indies Empire style. The original building was partially collapsed due to an earthquake on 15 May 1923 and later was torn down and rebuilt due to safety hazard. The only original part of the station that survives is the platform canopy.

The station once had a railway lines to Purwokerto Timur and Wonosobo that were built by the Serajoedal Stoomtram Maatschappij (SDS) in 1896. The railway lines were closed and dismantled during the Japanese occupation in 1943.

== Building and layout ==
Maos Station has four platforms and seven lines, with line 2 being a straight line. The line 6 and 7 is used for loading and unloading of Pertamina petroleum trains. The Pertamina oil depot itself is located to the northeast of the station.

Few hundred meters to the west there is a railway bridge across Serayu River and not far from it there is the railway junction to Banjar and Cilacap at Kasugihan Station, with the station itself located on the Cilacap branch line.

== Services ==
The following is a list of train services at Maos Station

=== Passenger services ===
Train name	Class	Train endpoints		Note
Purwojaya	Executive	Gambir	Cilacap	via Cirebon–Purwokerto
Baturraden Express	Executive-Business	Bandung	Purwokerto	via Tasikmalaya–Kroya
Kutojaya Selatan	Economy	Kiaracondong	Kutoarjo	via Tasikmalaya–Kroya
Serayu	Economy	Pasar Senen	Purwokerto	via Kiaracondong–Kroya
Lodaya (no stopped for regular only)	Executive-Economy	Bandung	Solo Balapan	via Tasikmalaya–Kroya
Pasundan	Economy	Kiaracondong	Surabaya Gubeng	via Tasikmalaya–Lempuyangan
Mutiara Selatan	Executive-Premium Economy	Bandung	Surabaya Gubeng	via Tasikmalaya–Yogyakarta
Kahuripan	Economy	Kiaracondong	Blitar	via Tasikmalaya–Lempuyangan
Malabar	Executive-Economy	Bandung	Malang	via Tasikmalaya–Yogyakarta
Wijayakusuma	Executive-Premium Economy	Cilacap	Ketapang	via Yogyakarta–Surabaya Gubeng
Joglosemarkerto	Executive-Premium Economy	Yogyakarta	Cilacap	
Kamandaka	Executive-Economy	Semarang Tawang	Cilacap	

=== Freight ===
- Pertamina petroleum to Larangan via Purwokerto–Slawi

Preceding station	Kereta Api Indonesia	Following station
Kasugihan towards Cilacap	Cilacap–Kroya	Sikampuh towards Kroya
Terminus	Maos–Purwokerto Timur (Closed)	~~Pasar Maos~~ towards ~~Purwokerto Timur~~
