= Cilacap–Kroya–Yogyakarta railway =

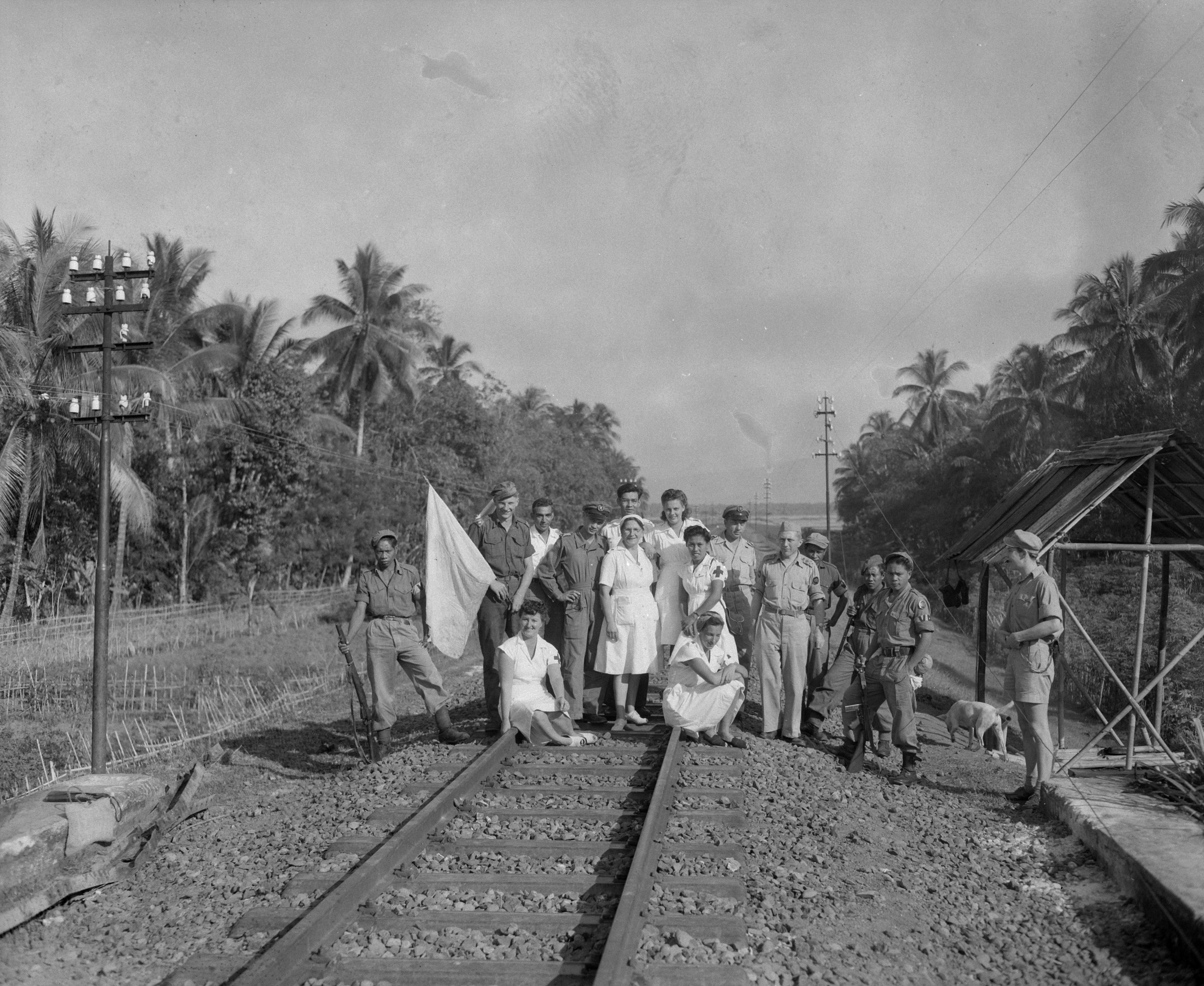
- Portrait of Dutch soldiers and Palang Merah Indonesia health professional awaiting the evacuation of Republican troops. Around Gombong, 8 August 1948

Overview
- Native name: Jalur kereta api Cilacap–Kroya–Yogyakarta
- Status: Operational
- Owner: Directorate General of Railways (DJKA)
- Locale: Cilacap, Central Java - Yogyakarta, Special Region of Yogyakarta
- Termini: Cilacap; Yogyakarta
- Stations: 40

Service
- Type: Inter-city rail and Commuter rail
- Operator: PT Kereta Api Indonesia

History
- Opened: 20 July 1887

Technical
- Number of tracks: 2
- Track gauge: 1,067 mm (3 ft 6 in)
- Electrification: not available

Cilacap–Kroya–Yogyakarta railway is a corridor railway line in Southern Java which has a length of 175 kilometres (109 mi). This railway line is included in Operation Area V Purwokerto in the Cilacap–Purworejo segment and Operation Area VI Yogyakarta in the Montelan–Yogyakarta segment. KAI Commuter operates the Prambanan Express Commuter Line (Prameks) on the Kutoarjo–Yogyakarta route, while KAI Bandara operates the Yogyakarta International Airport Rail Link (YIA) from Yogyakarta to Yogyakarta International Airport (YIA). These lines collectively form part of the southern Java line, stretching from west to east serving both passenger and freight trains, parallel to the south coast of Central Java and entirely in the lowlands. This line is built by the Semarang Class I Railway Engineering Center.

In the middle is the Ijo railway tunnel, one of the longest railway tunnels in Central Java, penetrating the karst mountains of South Gombong. On the east side of this line (between Prembun and Kutoarjo) is a flood prone route due to its low geographical position and crossing swampy areas. Uniquely, all railway lines in the Special Region of Yogyakarta have the status of Sultan Ground and Paku Alam Ground.

Present, the Kroya–Yogyakarta line is already a double track line, but the Kroya–Cilacap station and the Kroya–Kasugihan Station separation switch are still single track lines and the Cilacap–Tanjung Intan Port and Kutoarjo–Purworejo branch lines are also single track but are still inactive. There are several high bridges on this line, namely the one that crosses the Progo River (Mbeling railway bridge).

After passing Kutoarjo Station, the line skirts the southern tip of the Menoreh Mountains, then turns northeast towards Yogyakarta Station, then east and northeast until it reaches Solo Balapan in the center of Surakarta. The line also connects Jakarta or West Java with Central Java, Yogyakarta, and East Java, although the main Jakarta–Surabaya route is through the north of Java (via Semarang).

== History ==
=== Began Construction ===
This railway line originated from negotiations in 1875 between the Dutch East Indies Colonial Government and the Nederlandsch-Indische Spoorweg Maatschappij (NIS), regarding the development of the Semarang–Vorstenlanden line concession, which would lead to the following:

- The planned Solo–Madiun line (Solo Balapan–Surabaya railway line segment) would be connected to Semarang–Vorstenlanden, with the existing track gauge being changed from 1,435 mm (4 ft 8 1/2 in) to 1,067 mm (3 ft 6 in)
- NIS would obtain a concession for the line from Cilacap–Yogyakarta.

The NIS proposal, although submitted to the Ministry of Colonial Affairs, received little attention and underwent numerous changes. In the Dutch East Indies, the proposal was criticized by others, including David Maarschalk. Minister Van Goltstein then proposed that the transaction be recorded in a treaty, as follows:

- the takeover of the Batavia–Buitenzorg railway line, with a transaction value of ƒ5,000,000,
- the planned change in the track width for the Semarang–Vorstenlanden railway line,
- the planned Solo–Madiun line, and
- the planned Cilacap–Yogyakarta line.

Goltstein's successor, F. Alting Mees, agreed to the transaction. However, he proposed changes, including adding the Yogyakarta–Magelang railway line and connecting it to the Yogyakarta–Cilacap concession. On 13 June 1877, the contract was finally signed and the concession granted, subject to further approval of several legal provisions. A draft law addressing this was submitted to the Tweede Kamer later that month.

During the projects carried out by the Staatsspoorwegen (SS) had reached the construction stage, David Maarschalk submitted the detailed engineering design (DED) for the Cilacap–Yogyakarta railway line on 3 November 1880. Twelve days later, he announced his retirement as Head of the SS, and the position of Head of the SS was replaced by his Technical Director at that time, H.G. Derx. Next, At the end of 1883, the Dutch East Indies Government received three applications for the construction of the Yogyakarta–Cilacap railway line and the Surabaya–Ujung segment of the Surabaya–Ujung railway line, namely from the engineering and design team of SS, J. K. Kempees and Th. A.M. Ruys, Nederlandsche Handel-Maatschappij (NHM), and A.W. Egter van Wissekerke and M.A. van Walcheren, whose requests were continuously considered by the Royal Dutch Government, thus deciding that the Cilacap–Yogyakarta railway project would be carried out by and on behalf of the State. This project didn't always run smoothly. The initial Maarschalk plan was cancelled, while the connection between Surabaya and Ujung Port was removed from the 1883 Dutch East Indies state budget. This was due to the impact of the Aceh War, falling coffee prices, and the cost of public works, which caused the Dutch East Indies' finances to plummet, forcing Ministers W.M. de Brauw and F.G. van Bloemen Waanders to limit state spending. The state's interference in the Tweede Kamer was constantly criticized by J.L. de Bruyn Kops, founder and editor of the magazine de Economist, many Ministers didn't receive support from the Tweede Kamer, except for member L. Oldenhuis Gratama. Moreover, the half-hearted attitude of Minister van Bloemen Waanders, who wanted to cut the railway construction project by the State and "split" the completion of the plan drawn up over a longer period, actually did not satisfy both parties and the opposition.

Maarschalk and Groll proposed taking over the government-proposed line concessions, to be operated by the SS. On 29 January 1884, before the Indisch Genootschap, Maarschalk elaborated on his idea. This proposal sparked heated controversy in the media. It was also discussed repeatedly in the Tweede Kamer session. However, Minister Van Bloemen Waanders refused to participate and chose to resign when his budget was approved when submitting proposal letters to the Tweede Kamer. His successor, Mr. J.P. Sprenger van Eyk, initially supported the plan to take over the Surabaya–Ujung and Cilacap–Yogyakarta projects. After heated debate in the Tweede Kamer session, the funds were finally approved, allowing the Minister to include it in the State Gazette No. 110 and 111 dated 20 July 1884, concerning the construction of the Surabaya–Ujung railway line and from Yogyakarta to Cilacap, with a branch from Kutoarjo to Purworejo. The Cilacap–Yogyakarta line finally opened on 20 July 1887.

The Bandung–Yogyakarta connection hadn't yet been established. Initially, SS planned to build a line running from Tasikmalaya to Cilacap, which would later be connected to Cilacap Pelabuhan railway station. However, because the route would pass through swamps, the project became increasingly challenging, compounded by the absence of residents living near the project site, and many of the workers were suffering from malaria. Furthermore, Cilacap no longer played a significant role in the defense and security sectors. As a result of this plan, the end point of the line was chosen at the Kasugihan Station emplacement, and a large station for general passengers was built at Maos.

=== Double-track railway ===
There used to be a double track between Cilacap and Gumilir, and it passed through the former Rawahbasum (Rawapasung) stop. The line and stations were built due to requests from the people of Sidanegara and Gunung simping, Cilacap Tengah, Cilacap because the distance from Cilacap and Gumilir was too far.

The Rawahbasum stop was previously only a temporary stop because the two stations were quite busy with commodity transport. In fact, in 1945, a circular railway line was built to this stop so that freight trains arriving at Cilacap Pelabuhan Station didn't have to turn back to Cilacap Station. However, currently the ring line is no longer active, and most trains don't stop at the Rawahbasum stop.

The Rawahbasum bus stop is suspected to have been dismantled due to the construction of the Pertamina pipeline network on the Cilacap–Rewulu route.

=== Post-Independence: Dutch Military Aggression II ===
During the Second Dutch Military Aggression, this route was destroyed. A total of 325 bridges were demolished, along with most of the stations. The fighters deliberately burned the bridges to hinder the movement of Dutch troops by train. The Mbeling railway bridge, which was a vital bridge on the southern Java route, still needed repairs until it was finally completed and ready for use again on 17 June 1951.

=== Double-track Kutoarjo - Yogyakarta ===
The construction of the Kutoarjo–Yogyakarta double track segment began in 2004 and was completed in 2007. Inaugurated on 22 January 2008 by the then President of Indonesia, SBY, this double track cost Rp900 billion with a loan from Japan through the Japan Bank for International Cooperation (JBIC), to the Directorate General of Land Transportation (before the railway management task was transferred to the Directorate General of Railways). In his speech at Kutoarjo railway station, SBY said that the capacity of the southern Java railway line, especially Kutoarjo–Yogyakarta, was increasingly crowded and the number of crossings was considered ineffective for faster and more timely train travel. In addition to inaugurating this segment of the double-track line, he also inaugurated the operation of the Depok KRL Depot. Responding to the inauguration, the then Head of Operations V Purwokerto, Noor Hamidi, also outlined plans for the construction of a double-track line across central and southern Java.

In addition to building a double track, PT Kereta Api also decided to close two stations because they no longer serve passengers and their locations are not strategic, namely Kedundang railway station and Montelan Station. In detail, the opening of this double track is divided into several segments, namely:

- Kutoarjo–Wojo on 17 August 2007
- Wojo–Wates on 18 July 2007
- Wates–Rewulu on 28 August 2007
- The remaining projects are completely completed on 25 September 2007

=== Double-track Kroya - Kutoarjo ===
Following the success of the Kutoarjo–Yogyakarta double-track section in 2008, the Directorate General of Railways (DJKA) began the double-track project for the Kroya–Kutoarjo route. This project was scheduled to begin in 2013 with a survey of buildings affected by the double-tracking along the rail banks. To implement the project, the Directorate General of Railways, through the Central Java Railway Engineering Center (now BTP Semarang), formed a working unit called the Southern Java Line Development (PLS). In this plan, DJKA will also build a new Green Tunnel to replace the existing tunnel.

This double-track line was also built simultaneously with the Purwokerto–Kroya section on the southern route of Java, as well as the Solo Balapan–Balangan–Jombang section. Given that the area between Prembun and Kutoarjo is very low-lying and swampy, the construction of the double-track line was hampered by frequent flooding during the rainy season. The long time it took for the water to recede made the filling of track bearings less effective.

These line completed with the activation of the last section (Gombong–Tambak) in April 2020, also with the activation of the new Ijo Tunnel. On 8 October 2020, A pre-official launch event was held for this line at Solo Balapan Station, attended by the Minister of Transportation Budi Karya Sumadi.

== Service ==
Here's train that passing Cilacap-Kroya-Yogyakarta railway line:

=== Passenger ===
==== Inter-city ====
Southern Java line
Train name	Route
Executive
Purwojaya	Gambir–Cilacap
Taksaka	Gambir–Yogyakarta
Argo Lawu	Gambir–Solo Balapan
Argo Dwipangga	Gambir–Solo Balapan
Manahan	Gambir–Solo Balapan
Argo Wilis	Bandung–Surabaya Gubeng
Turangga	Bandung–Surabaya Gubeng
Argo Semeru	Gambir–Surabaya Gubeng
Bima	Gambir–Surabaya Gubeng
Gajayana	Gambir–Malang
Executive-Business
Baturraden Express (ceased)	Bandung–Purwokerto
Executive-Premium Economy
Sawunggalih	Pasar Senen–Kutoarjo
Fajar and Senja Utama Yogya	Pasar Senen–Yogyakarta
Gajahwong	Pasar Senen–Lempuyangan
Madiun Jaya	Pasar Senen–Madiun
Mutiara Selatan	Bandung–Surabaya Gubeng
Malabar	Bandung–Malang
Wijayakusuma	Cilacap–Surabaya Gubeng–Banyuwangi
Sangkuriang	Bandung–Ketapang
Executive-Economy
Lodaya	Bandung–Solo Balapan
Bogowonto	Pasar Senen–Lempuyangan
Kertanegara	Purwokerto–Malang
Malioboro Express	Purwokerto–Malang
Fajar and Senja Utama Solo	Pasar Senen–Solo Balapan
Mataram	Pasar Senen–Solo Balapan
Batavia	Gambir–Solo Balapan
Bangunkarta	Pasar Senen–Jombang
Ranggajati	Cirebon–Surabaya Gubeng–Jember
Gaya Baru Malam Selatan	Pasar Senen–Surabaya Gubeng
Singasari	Pasar Senen–Blitar
Premium Economy
Logawa	Purwokerto–Surabaya Gubeng–Banyuwangi
Jayakarta	Pasar Senen–Surabaya Gubeng
Economy
Kutojaya Selatan	Kiaracondong–Kutoarjo
Serayu	Pasar Senen–Kiaracondong–Purwokerto
Kutojaya Utara	Pasar Senen–Kutoarjo
Progo	Pasar Senen–Lempuyangan
Bengawan	Pasar Senen–Purwosari
Jaka Tingkir	Pasar Senen–Solo Balapan
Pasundan	Kiaracondong–Surabaya Gubeng
Kahuripan	Kiaracondong–Blitar

Northern Java line
Train Name	Route
Executive-Economy
Sancaka Utara	Cilacap–Yogyakarta–Surabaya Pasarturi

==== Commuter ====
Train name	Class	Route	
Joglosemarkerto	Executive and economy	Solo Balapan	Semarang Tawang (clockwise via Yogyakarta and Purwokerto)
Joglosemarkerto	Executive and economy	Solo Balapan	Solo Balapan (counterclockwise via Tegal and Purwokerto)
Joglosemarkerto	Executive-Premium Economy	Yogyakarta	Cilacap
Kamandaka	Executive-Economy	Semarang Tawang	Cilacap

=== Freight ===
Train name	Route	
Southern Java line
Cement Cargo Solusi Bangun Indonesia	Karangtalun	Lempuyangan
Cement Cargo Solusi Bangun Indonesia	Karangtalun	Solo Balapan
Cement Cargo Solusi Bangun Indonesia	Karangtalun	Brambanan
Cement Cargo Solusi Bangun Indonesia	Karangtalun	Cirebon Prujakan
Avtur Pertamina cargo	Cilacap	Rewulu
Fertilizer Cargo Pupuk Indonesia	Cilacap	Ceper
Fertilizer Cargo Pupuk Indonesia	Cilacap	Prupuk
Overnight train service Southern Parcel	Bandung	Surabaya Kota
Overnight train service Middle Parcel	Kampung Bandan	Malang
BBM Pertamina Cargo	Rewulu	Madiun
BBM Pertamina Cargo	Maos	Tegal
Northern Java Line
Cement Cargo Solusi Bangun Indonesia	Brumbung	Karangtalun

== See also ==
- Padalarang–Kasugihan railway
- Cikampek–Cirebon Prujakan railway
- Bandung–Surabaya line
