= Kutoarjo railway station =

Railway station in Indonesia

P09 JS07 Kutoarjo Station Stasiun Kutoarjo
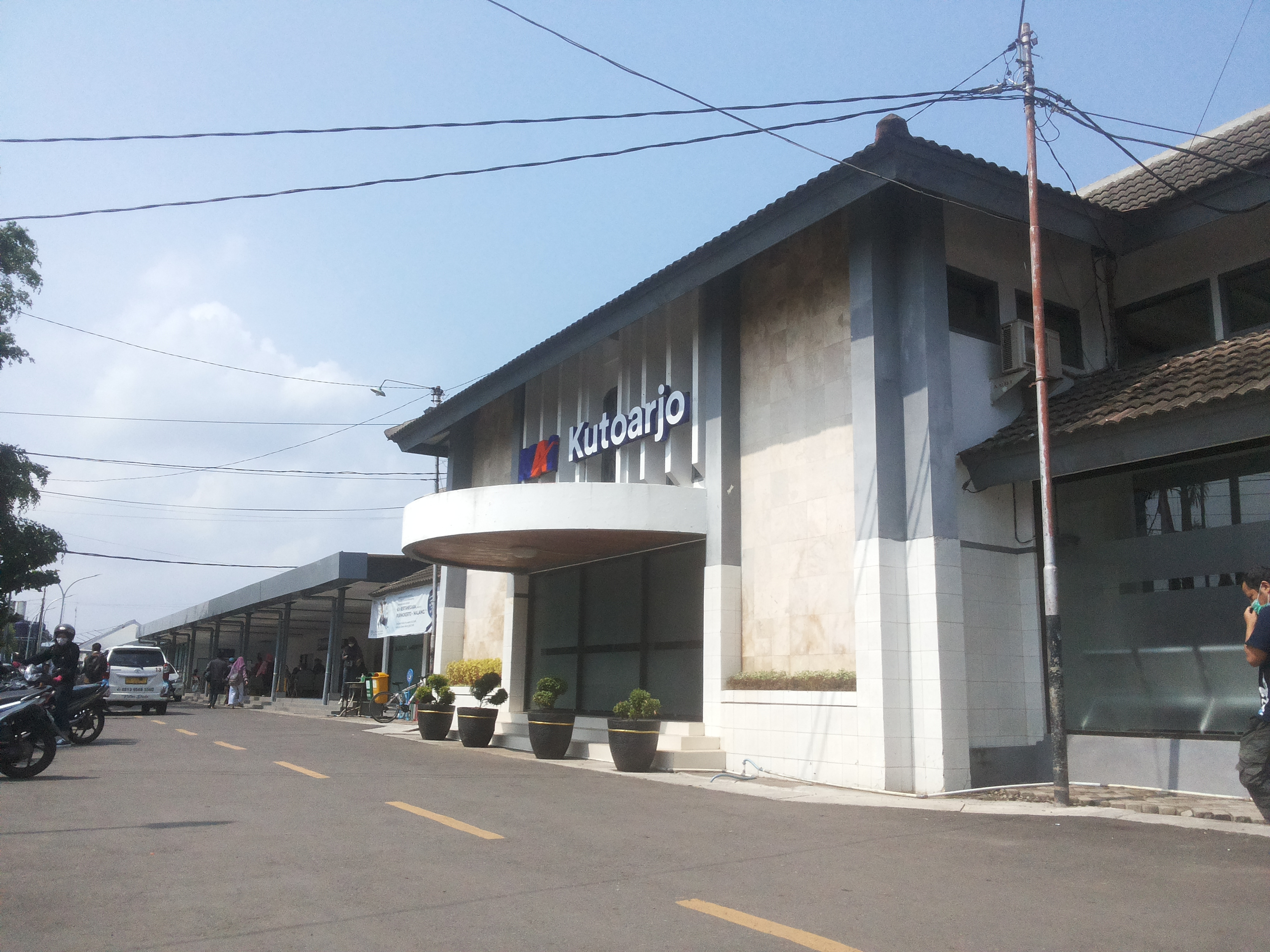
- Kutoarjo Station in 2021

General information
- Location: Jalan Merpati, Semawung Daleman, Kutoarjo, Purworejo Regency, Central Java, Indonesia
- Coordinates: 7.72603°S 109.90715°E
- Elevation: +16m
- Owner: Kereta Api Indonesia
- Manager: Kereta Api Indonesia
- Lines: Prambanan Express; Joglosemarkerto
- Platforms: 1 side platform 4 island platforms
- Tracks: 8

Construction
- Parking: Available

Other information
- Station code: KTA • 2040
- Classification: Large type A

Services
Preceding station		Following station
Jenar towards Yogyakarta	Prambanan Express	Terminus
Location
- Location within Java

Kutoarjo Station (KTA) is a large type A railway station located in Kutoarjo District, Purworejo Regency, Central Java, Indonesia. The station is located at an altitude of +16 meters and is the easternmost active station operated by Operation Area V Purwokerto.

== History ==
Kutoarjo Station was opened on 20 July 1887, along with the opening of Cilacap–Kroya–Kutoarjo–Yogyakarta mainline and the 12 km Kutoarjo–Purworejo branch line. The Purworejo branch line was closed in 2010, and over time the line was used to store disused sliding-roof wagons. The line was planned to be reactivated by late 2023, and beginning in June 2023 the disused wagons were scrapped.

== Building and layout ==
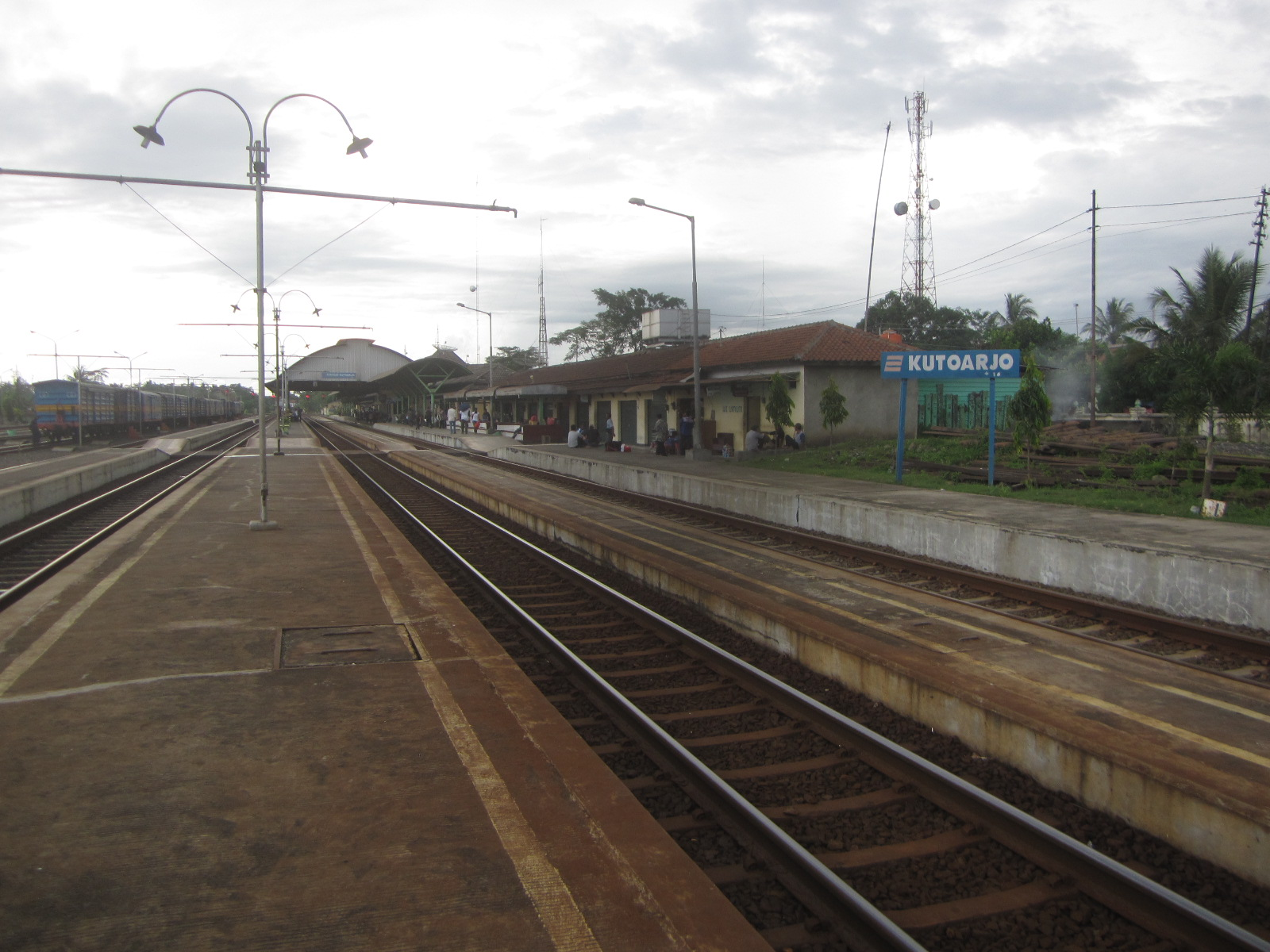
Platforms and railway lines of Kutoarjo station, 22 April 2011

Kutoarjo Station has eight railway lines. Initially the line 2 was a straight line, however after the completion of double track line to Surabaya/Malang in 2007 and was opened on 22 January 2008, the line 3 was used as the straight line for double track towards Surabaya/Malang as well as the main line for the single track towards Jakarta/Bandung, while line 2 is used as the straight line for double track towards Surabaya/Malang and also used for shunting line.

After the opening of double track line to Butuh Station on 30 November 2019, line 2 was used as the straight line towards Kroya, while line 3 was used as the straight line only to and from Surabaya/Malang. Lines 4 and 5 are used to accommodate trains departing from the station, while line 6 is usually utilized to store out-of-service trains and for shunting. To the east of the line 1 there is a junction for the branch line towards Purworejo, however the branch line was closed in 2010 and then was used to store disused sliding-roof wagons.

The current station building is not of the original Colonial era building, except for the platform canopy over line 1 to 3 along with some of the doors and wall facing to the platform 1. Kutoarjo Station original building is thought to have a similar architecture to Purworejo Station. The station building was renovated and altered to tackle overcrowding due to high passenger traffic.

To the east of the station there is a passenger coach depot and a locomotive shed. To the south of the station there are two lines for storing and washing the passenger coaches, while the lines itself lead to a turntable.

== Services ==
The following is a list of train services at Kutoarjo Station

=== Passenger services ===
==== Commuter ====
- Prambanan Express to Yogyakarta

==== Intercity ====
Train name	Class	Train endpoints		Note
Kutojaya Selatan	Economy	Kutoarjo	Kiaracondong	via Banjar
Lodaya	Executive-Economy	Bandung	Solo Balapan	via Banjar–Kutoarjo
Pasundan	Economy	Kiaracondong	Surabaya Gubeng	via Banjar–Lempuyangan
Argo Wilis	Executive	Bandung	Surabaya Gubeng	via Banjar–Yogyakarta
Turangga	Executive	Bandung	Surabaya Gubeng	via Banjar–Yogyakarta
Mutiara Selatan	Executive-Premium Economy	Bandung	Surabaya Gubeng	via Banjar–Yogyakarta
Kahuripan	Economy	Kiaracondong	Blitar	via Banjar–Lempuyangan
Malabar	Executive-Economy	Bandung	Malang	via Banjar–Yogyakarta
Sawunggalih	Executive-Premium Economy	Kutoarjo	Pasar Senen	via Purwokerto
Kutojaya Utara	Premium Economy	Kutoarjo	Jakarta Kota	via Purwokerto
Fajar and Senja Utama Yogya	Executive-Premium Economy	Pasar Senen	Yogyakarta	via Purwokerto
Taksaka (no stopped)	Executive-Luxury	Gambir	Yogyakarta	via Purwokerto
Bogowonto	Executive-Premium Economy	Pasar Senen	Lempuyangan	via Purwokerto
Gajahwong	Executive-Economy	Pasar Senen	Lempuyangan	via Purwokerto
Progo	Economy	Pasar Senen	Lempuyangan	via Purwokerto
Kertanegara	Executive-Economy	Purwokerto	Malang	via Yogyakarta–Blitar
Malioboro Express	Premium Economy	Purwokerto	Malang	via Yogyakarta–Blitar
Jaka Tingkir	Economy	Pasar Senen	Purwosari	via Purwokerto
Bengawan	Economy	Pasar Senen	Purwosari	via Purwokerto
Fajar and Senja Utama Solo	Executive-Premium Economy	Pasar Senen	Solo Balapan	via Purwokerto
Mataram	Executive-Premium Economy	Pasar Senen	Solo Balapan	via Purwokerto
Manahan	Executive	Gambir	Solo Balapan	via Purwokerto Only runs on Thursday–Sunday and national holidays
Bangunkarta	Executive-Economy	Pasar Senen	Jombang	via Purwokerto–Yogyakarta
Gaya Baru Malam Selatan	Executive-Economy	Pasar Senen	Surabaya Gubeng	via Purwokerto–Lempuyangan
Jayakarta	Premium Economy	Pasar Senen	Surabaya Gubeng	via Purwokerto–Lempuyangan
Argo Semeru	Executive	Gambir	Surabaya Gubeng	via Purwokerto–Yogyakarta
Bima	Executive	Gambir	Surabaya Gubeng	via Purwokerto–Yogyakarta
Singasari	Executive-Economy	Pasar Senen	Blitar	via Purwokerto–Lempuyangan
Gajayana	Executive-Luxury	Gambir	Malang	via Purwokerto–Yogyakarta
Logawa	Executive-Premuim Economy	Purwokerto	Jember	via Lempuyangan–Surabaya Gubeng
Wijayakusuma	Executive-Premium Economy	Cilacap	Ketapang	via Yogyakarta–Surabaya Gubeng
Sangkuriang	Executive-Premium Economy	Bandung	Ketapang	via Yogyakarta–Surabaya Gubeng
Ranggajati	Executive-Economy	Cirebon	Jember	via Yogyakarta–Surabaya Gubeng
Joglosemarkerto	Executive-Premium Economy	Yogyakarta	Cilacap	
Joglosemarkerto	Executive-Economy	Solo Balapan	Semarang Tawang	via Yogyakarta–Purwokerto–Tegal loop line and vice versa

=== Freight ===
- Parcel Selatan (Southern Parcel) to Bandung and Surabaya Kota via Banjar–Lempuyangan
- Parcel Tengah (Middle Parcel) to Kampung Bandan and Malang via Purwokerto–Lempuyangan

== Supporting transportation ==
The station is served by Trans Jateng bus rapid transit Route P1 to Purworejo, Purworejo Regency and Borobudur, Magelang Regency.

Preceding station	Kereta Api Indonesia	Following station
Butuh towards Kroya	Kroya–Kutoarjo–Purworejo	~~Purworejo~~
Terminus	Kutoarjo–Purwosari	~~Montelan~~ towards Purwosari
