= Groll =

Groll is a surname. Notable people with the surname include:

- Albert Lorey Groll (1866–1952), American artist
- Josef Groll (1813–1887), Bavarian brewer, first brewer of Pilsner beer
- Sarah Israelit Groll (1925–2007), Israeli Egyptologist
- Theodor Groll (1857–1913), German painter

== See also ==
- Coenraad Liebrecht Temminck Groll, Dutch architect (1925–2015)
