= Sarah Israelit Groll =

Israeli Egyptologist and linguist

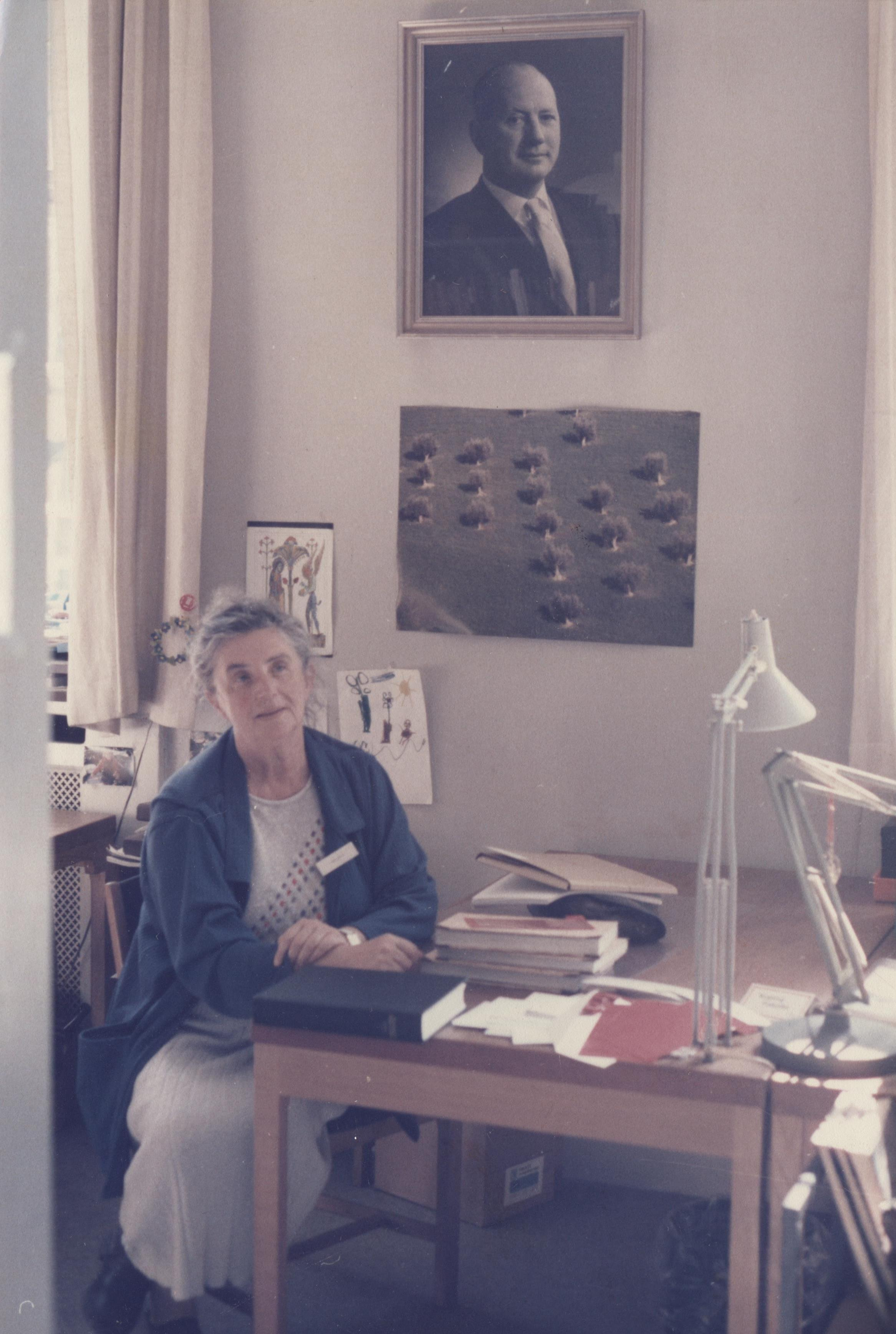
Sarah I. Groll, 1986, Copenhagen.

Sarah Israelit Groll (Hebrew: שרה ישראלית-גרול; 1925–2007) was an Israeli Egyptologist and linguist. She was born 1925 in Tel Aviv, Mandatory Palestine. She studied at the Hebrew University, Jerusalem, under Hans Jakob Polotsky, and at Oxford she studied Ramesside texts under Jaroslav Černý. She published her doctoral thesis On the problem of negative sentences in late Egyptian in 1963. In 1972 she founded the Department of Egyptology at the Hebrew University. She died on 16 December 2007. Groll's studies of the Late Egyptian verbal system deepened understanding of the ancient Egyptian language at this stage of its development.

== Works ==
- Sarah Israelit-Groll, Negative Verbal System of Late Egyptian, Oxford University Press, 1967
- Sarah Israelit-Groll, Egyptological Studies, 1983
- Jaroslav Cerny, Sarah Israelit Groll, Christopher Eyre, A Late Egyptian Grammar, 1984, ISBN 88-7653-435-0
- Sarah Israelit-Groll ed., Pharaonic Egypt: The Bible and Christianity, Hebrew University, Jerusalem 1985
- Sarah Israelit-Groll ed., Studies in Egyptology Presented to Miriam Lichtheim, The Magnes Press 1990, ISBN 965-223-733-7
- Marcel Sigrist, Sarah Israelit-Groll, Shalom M. Paul, B. Couroyer, Hans Jacob Polotsky, Krsysztof Modras, The Art of Love Lyrics : In Memory of Bernard Couroyer, OP and Hans Jacob Polotsky, First Egyptologists in Jerusalem, 2000
