= Kroya railway station =

Railway station in Indonesia

Kroya Station Stasiun Kroya
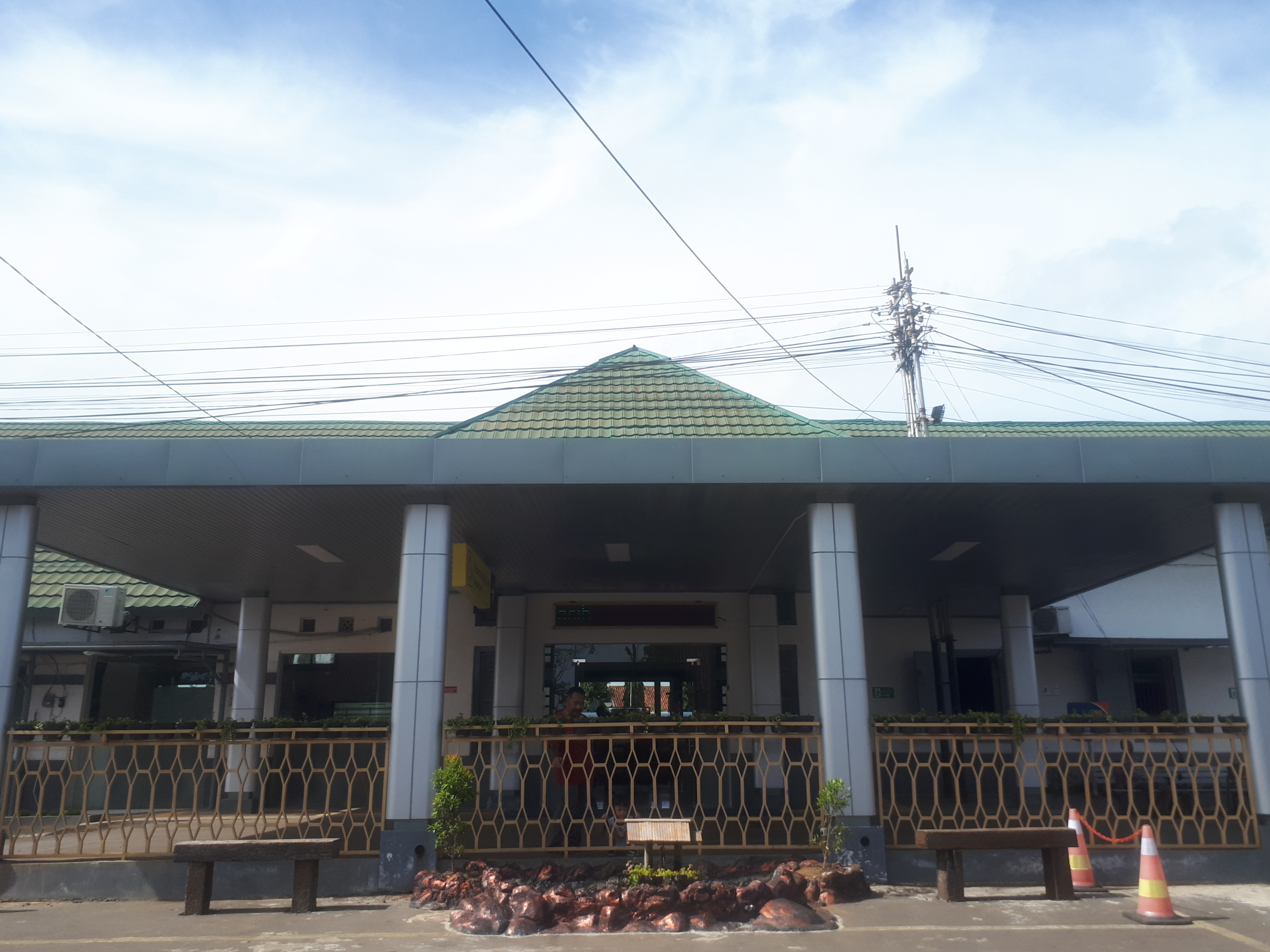
- Entrance of Kroya Station

General information
- Location: Bajing, Kroya, Cilacap Regency; Central Java; Indonesia
- Coordinates: 7.630113°S 109.253588°E
- Elevation: +11 m (36 ft)
- Owner: Kereta Api Indonesia
- Operator: Kereta Api Indonesia
- Lines: Kroya–Cilacap; Kroya–Kutoarjo; Prupuk–Kroya
- Platforms: 1 side platform 3 island platforms
- Tracks: 9

Construction
- Structure type: Ground
- Parking: Available
- Accessible: Available

Other information
- Station code: KYA • 2018
- Classification: Large class type B

History
- Opened: 20 July 1887
- Former names: Kroja Station
Location
- Location within Java

Kroya Station (KYA) is a railway station located in Bajing, Kroya, Cilacap Regency, Central Java, Indonesia. The station has nine railway tracks. It is a major junction station where the line from Yogyakarta split, where one goes to Purwokerto and Cirebon, while other head to Bandung.

== History ==
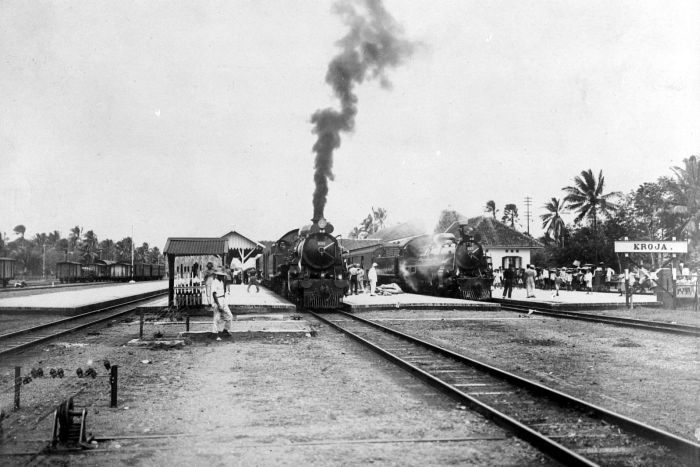
Eendaagsche Express, destination of Batavia–Soerabaja arrived at Kroya Station on 1 November 1929.

Kroya Station is estimated to have existed since the construction of the Cilacap-Kroya-Kutoarjo-Yogyakarta railway line on 20 July 1887. The development also included a branch line to Purworejo which opened on the same date.

On 1 July 1916, the Prupuk–Kroya railway was built to serve passengers from Cirebon.

Since the inauguration of the Eendaagsche Expres (one-day express) train by the Staatsspoorwegen (SS) on 1 November 1929, this station has been used as a place for the merger of the Eendaagsche Expres train which serves the Batavia–Soerabaja route with its feeder (KA feeder) coming from Bandung.

Initially this station consisted only of a main building and a platform that had a canopy that was almost similar to Manggarai Station (see picture). With the increase in the volume of passenger transportation at this station, the station building was later enlarged until it was finally replaced by overcapping in the 1990s. This old canopy, similar to Manggarai Station, appeared in the film Kereta Api Terakhir.

== Building and layout ==
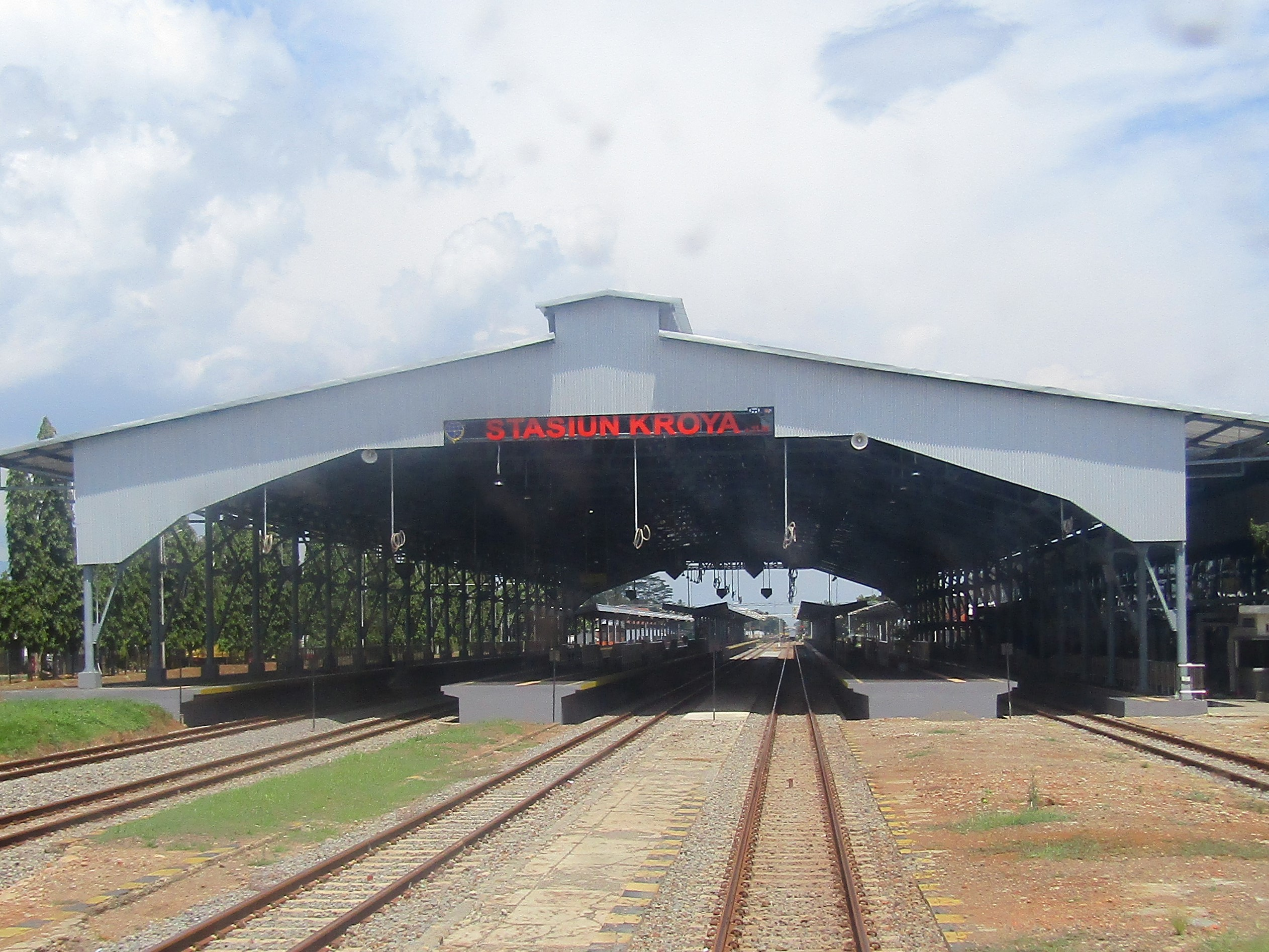
The emplacement of the station with the new roof overcapping, 2020

Kroya Station has nine railway lines. Initially, line 2 was a straight line in the direction of Bandung or Cilacap or Kutoarjo; line 3 is a straight line to and from Purwokerto; lines 1, 4 and 5 are used as lines for crossing and overtaking trains; lines 6 and 7 as lanes for the parking of freight trains and boiler trains; as well as lines 8 and 9 as connecting lines to the locomotive depot, train workshops, and UPT Mechanic Depot. After the double line was operated on this cross-station segment up to Purwokerto Station as of 5 March 2019 and then the plot of this station up to Kemranjen Station as of 31 July 2019, line 2 is now only used as a single track straight line from and only towards Bandung and Cilacap, line 4 is used as a double track straight line towards Kutoarjo, line 5 is used as a double track straight line towards Purwokerto, and lines 1, 3 and 6 are used as lines for crossing and overtaking trains.

There is a locomotive depot to the north of the station complex. In addition to servicing the locomotives that stopped by, this depot was once used to store locomotives and the Serayu train series. However, since the Serayu Train route was extended to Purwokerto Station, the allocation of the train series automatically moved to the Purwokerto Train Depot.

There is also a railway workshop which is located to the west of the station complex and is the largest train repair shop in Daop V. Apart from being a place for repairs, this workshop is used as a "cage" for KAI's Operational Area 5's auxiliary train facility.

Since the double-track was put into operation, the shape of this station has looked different compared to before. The overcapping roof covering lines 1–3 of these stations has been replaced with a new one and is larger in size; covering lanes 1–6. The station platform has also been extended and raised so that it can accommodate a long series of trains and makes it easier for passengers to get on and off the station platform. The typical old electrical signaling system from KAI's Operational Area 5 produced by Westinghouse Rail Systems which has been installed since 1999 has been replaced with the latest production by PT Len Industri. Now the former overcapping has been reused at Sumpiuh Station.

== Services ==
The following is a list of train services at the Kroya Station.

=== Passenger services ===
- Executive class
  - Argo Wilis, destination of Bandung and Surabaya Gubeng
  - Bima & Argo Semeru, destination of Gambir and Surabaya Gubeng
  - Gajayana, destination of Gambir and Malang
  - Turangga, destination of Bandung and Surabaya Gubeng
  - Taksaka, destination of Gambir and Yogyakarta
  - Purwojaya, destination of Gambir and Cilacap
- Mixed class
  - Mutiara Selatan, destination of Bandung and Surabaya Gubeng (executive-economy)
  - Malabar, destination of Bandung and Malang (executive-business-economy)
  - Gaya Baru Malam Selatan, destination of Pasar Senen and Surabaya Gubeng (executive-economy)
  - Ranggajati, destination of Cirebon and Jember via Surabaya Gubeng (executive-business)
  - Wijayakusuma, destination of Cilacap and Ketapang via Surabaya Gubeng (executive-economy)
  - Bangunkarta, destination of Pasar Senen and Jombang (executive-economy)
  - Mataram, destination of Pasar Senen and Solo Balapan (executive-business)
  - Bogowonto, destination of Pasar Senen and Lempuyangan (executive-economy)
  - Gajahwong, destination of Lempuyangan (executive-economy)
  - Sawunggalih, destination of Pasar Senen and Kutoarjo (executive-economy)
  - Lodaya, destination of Bandung and Solo Balapan (executive-economy-business)
  - Joglosemarkerto, looping train Central Java and Special Region of Yogyakarta (executive-economy) with destination of:
    - Semarang Tawang
    - Solo Balapan
  - Kutojaya Utara additional, destination of Pasar Senen and Kutoarjo (business-economy)
  - Logawa, destination of Purwokerto and Jember via Surabaya Gubeng (business-economy)
  - Malioboro Express, destination of Purwokerto and Malang (executive-economy)
- Economy class
  - Jayakarta, destination of Pasar Senen and Surabaya Gubeng
  - Kutojaya Utara, destination of Jakarta Kota and Kutoarjo
  - Sawunggalih, destination of Pasar Senen and Kutoarjo
  - Jaka Tingkir, destination of Pasar Senen and Purwosari
  - Kahuripan, destination of Kiaracondong and Blitar
  - Pasundan, destination of Kiaracondong and Surabaya Gubeng
  - Bengawan, destination of Pasar Senen and Purwosari
  - Progo, destination of Pasar Senen and Lempuyangan
  - Serayu, destination of Pasar Senen via Kiaracondong and Purwokerto
  - Kutojaya Selatan, destination of Kiaracondong and Kutoarjo

=== Freight services ===
- Over Night Services, destination of Surabaya Kota via Lempuyangan-Madiun-Jombang and Bandung via Tasikmalaya

== Gallery ==
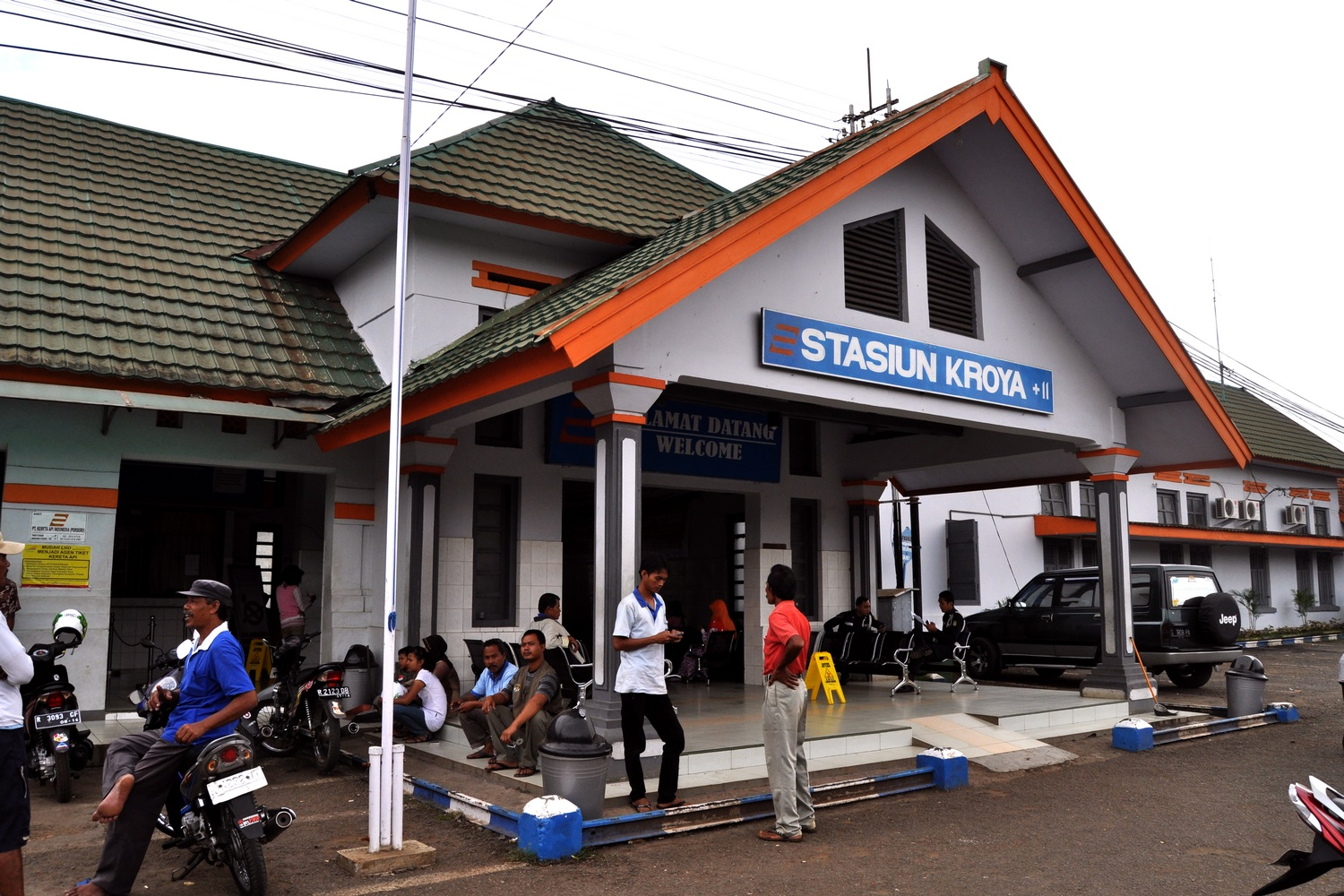
The front view of the station, 2012

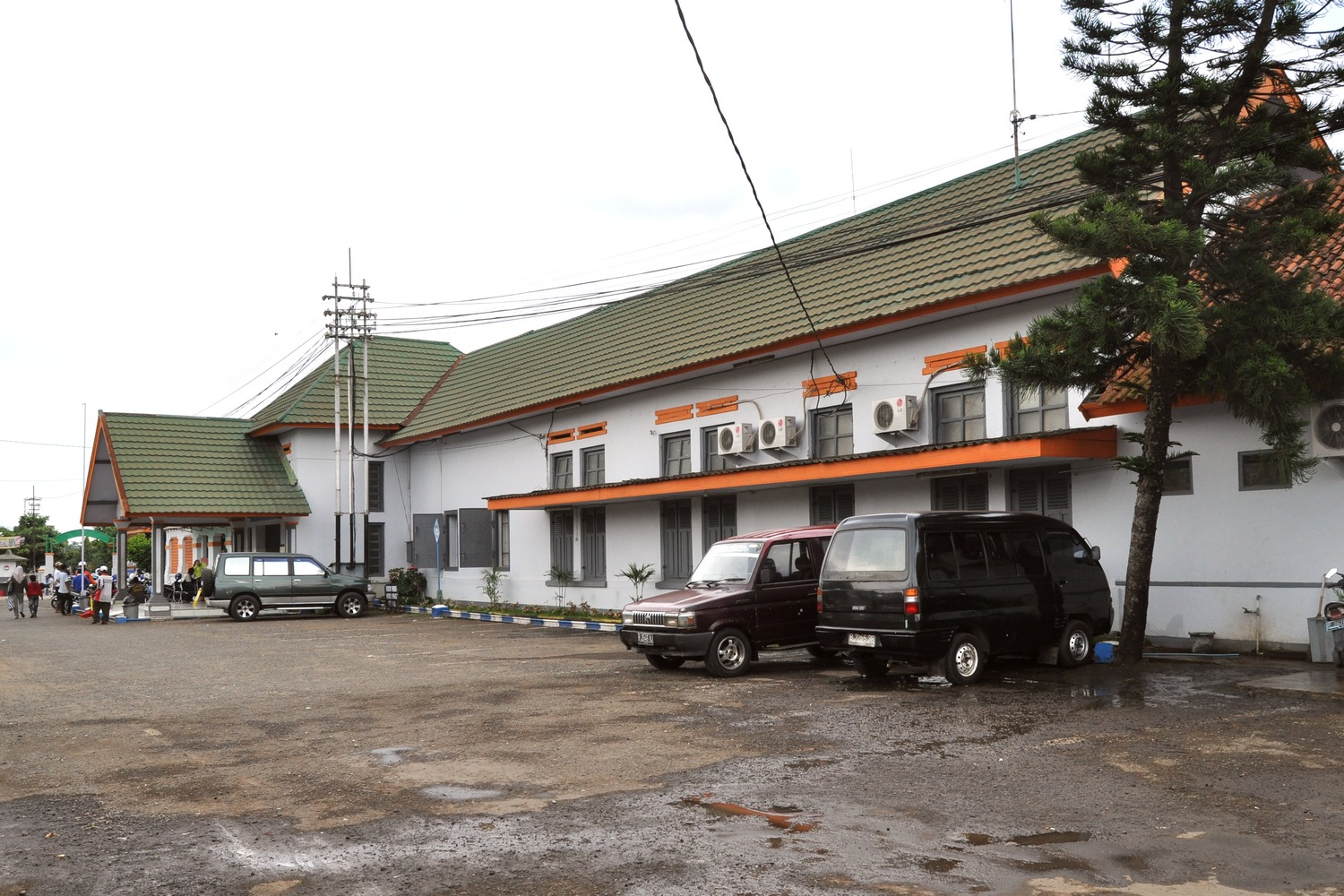
The front view of the station seen from the east

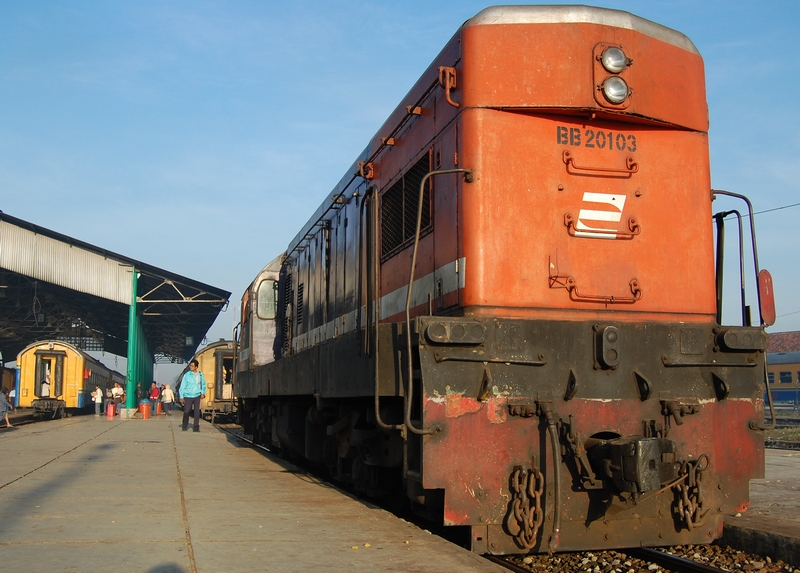
BB 201 Locomotive at Kroya Station, 2007

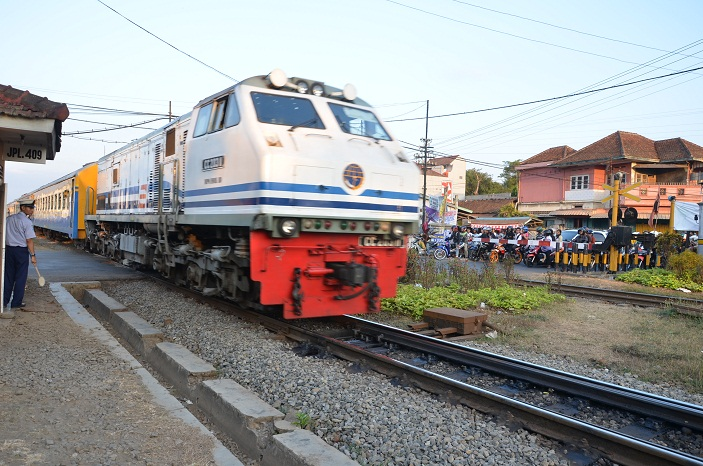
Ahmad Yani street level crossing at the west of Kroya Station

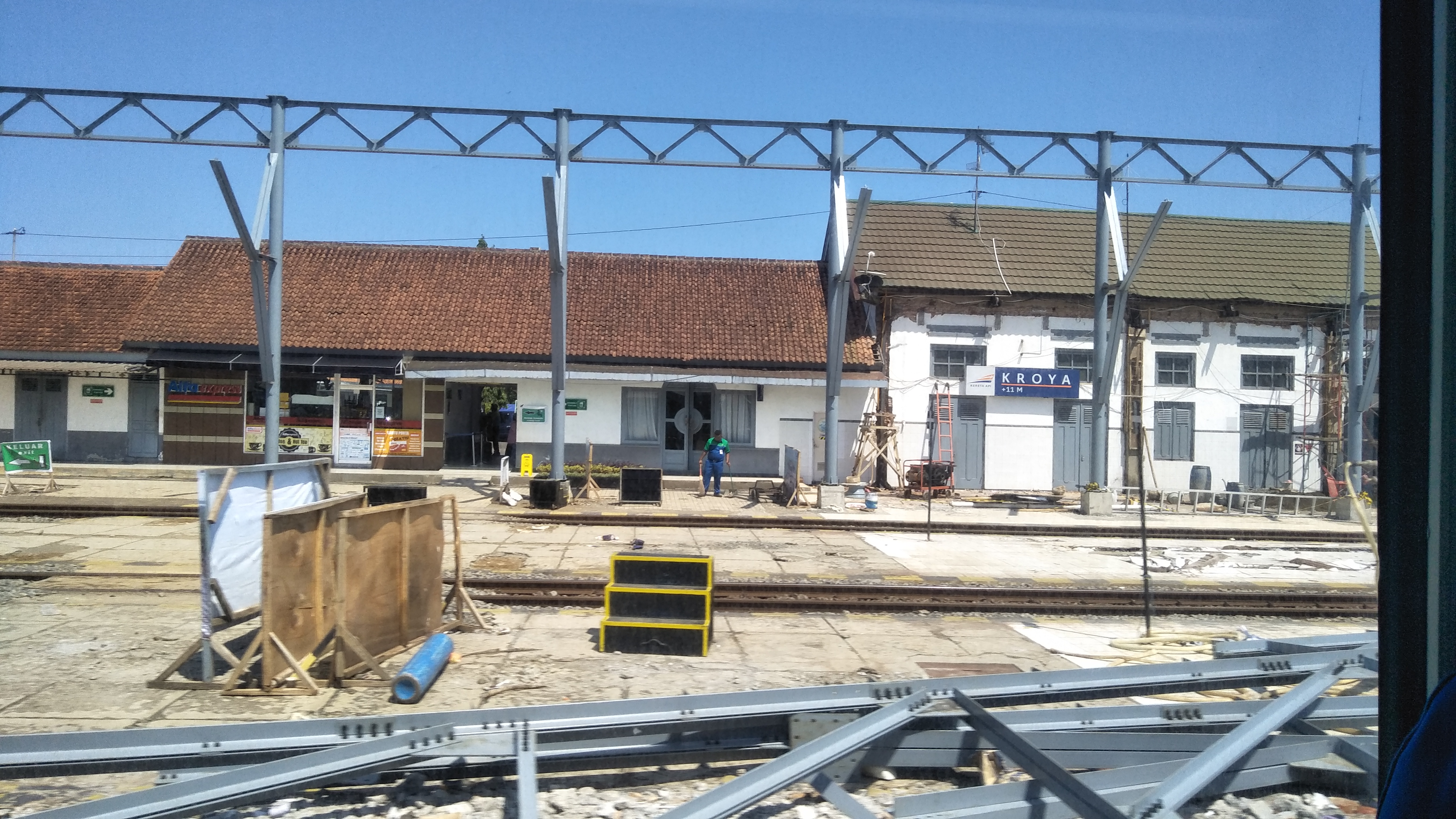
The reconstruction of the roof overcapping of the station

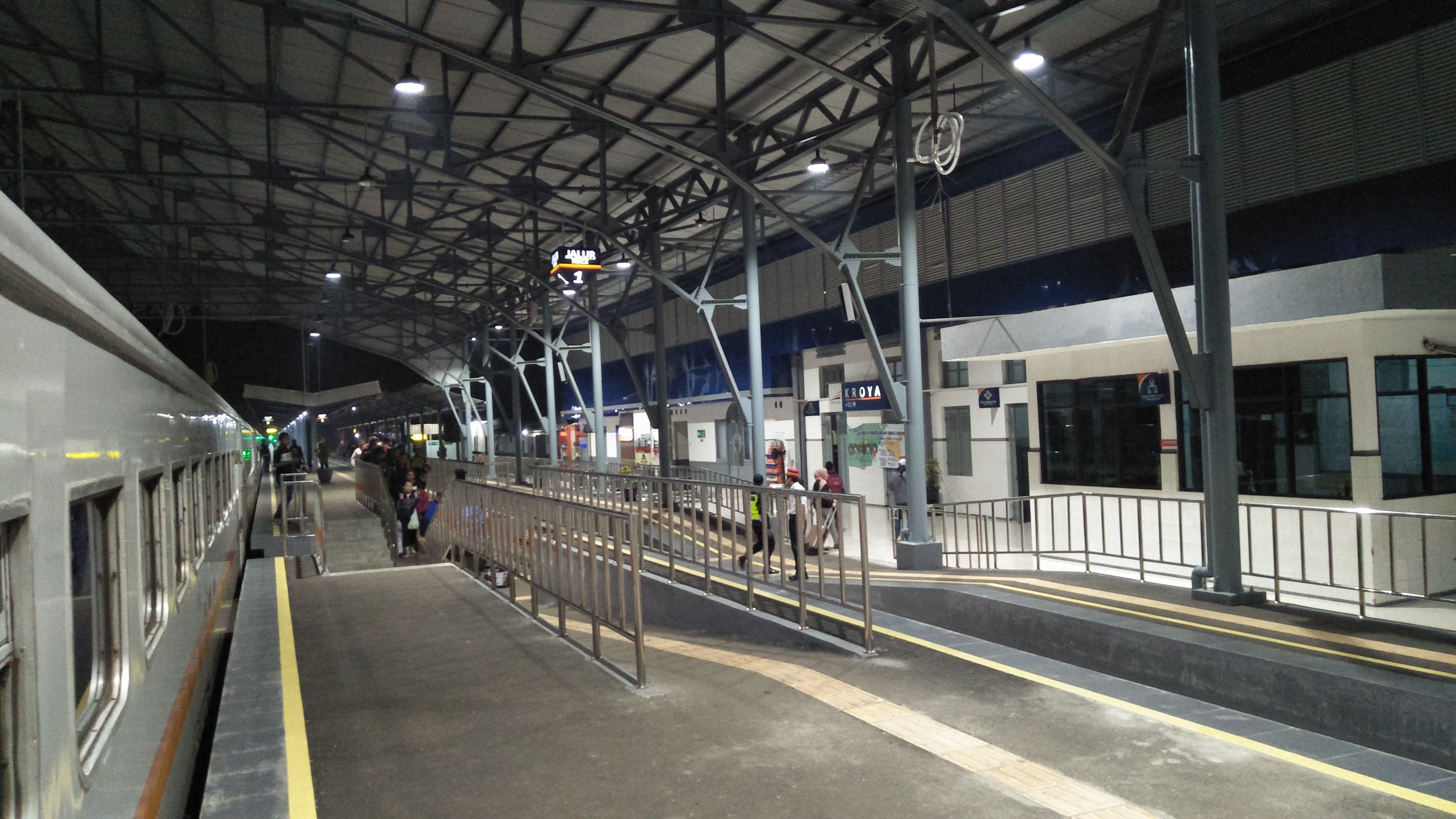
The emplacement of the station after renovation, March 2020

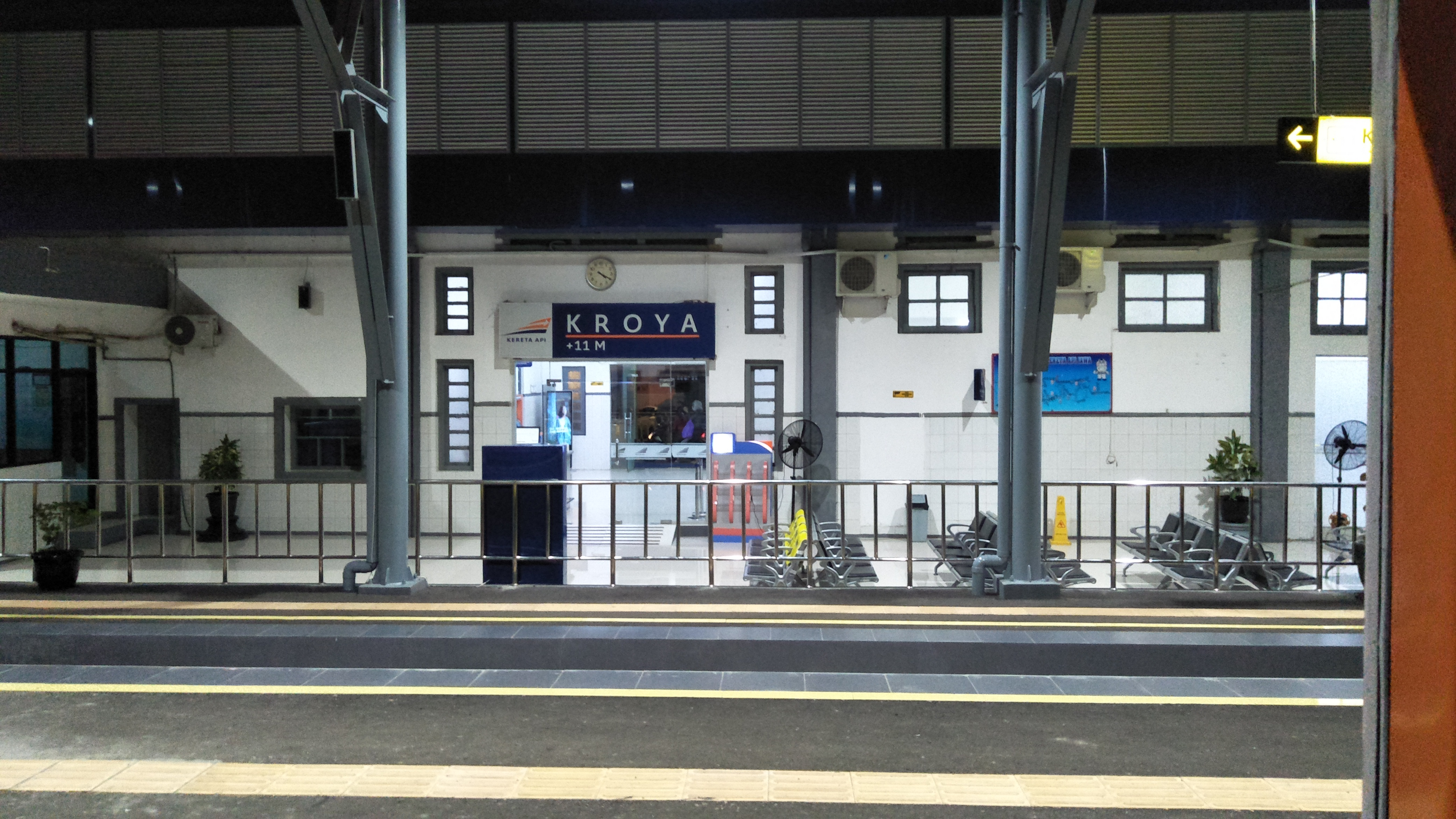
The signage of the station

Preceding station	Kereta Api Indonesia	Following station
Terminus	Kroya–Cilacap	Sikampuh towards Cilacap
Terminus	Kroya–Kutoarjo	Kemranjen towards Kutoarjo
Randegan towards Prupuk	Prupuk–Kroya	Terminus
