= Cilacap railway station =

Railway station in Indonesia

Cilacap Station Stasiun Cilacap
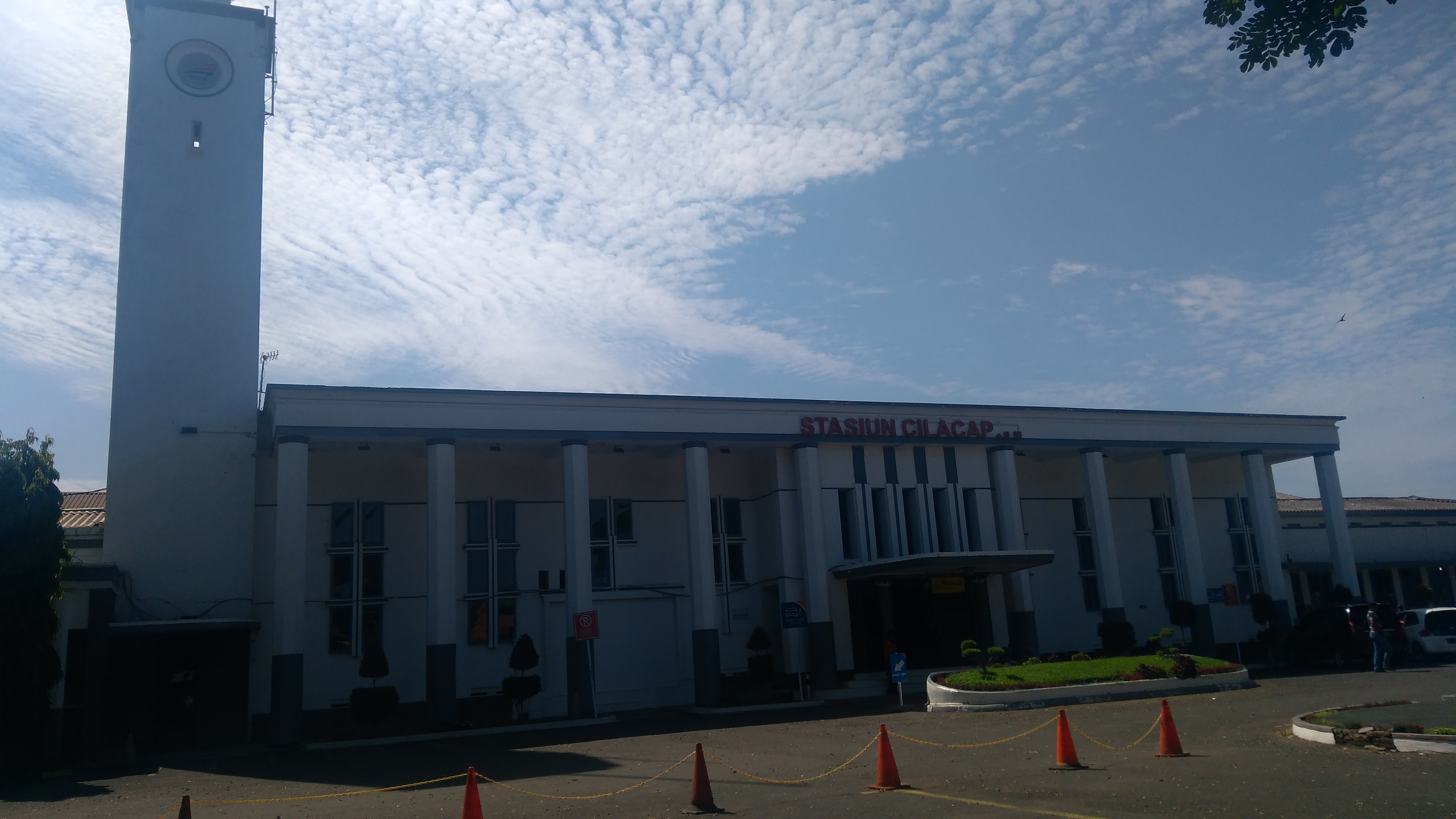
- Cilacap Station as of 2019.

General information
- Location: Sidakaya, South Cilacap, Cilacap Regency; Central Java; Indonesia
- Coordinates: 7.736093°S 109.006938°E
- Elevation: +8 m (26 ft)
- Owner: Kereta Api Indonesia
- Operator: Kereta Api Indonesia
- Line: Cilacap–Kroya
- Platforms: 1 side platform 2 island platforms
- Tracks: 5

Construction
- Structure type: Ground
- Parking: Available
- Accessible: Available

Other information
- Station code: CP
Location
- Location within Java

Cilacap Station is the most southern railway station in Java, Indonesia. It is located in Sidakaya, South Cilacap, Cilacap Regency, Central Java.

This station is served by 2 passenger train that are Purwojaya, directing to Gambir via Purwokerto and Wijayakusuma to Ketapang.

== Services ==
The following is a list of train services at the Cilacap Station

=== Central Java Lines ===
- Purwojaya, destination of Gambir via Purwokerto

=== Southern Java lines ===
- Wijayakusuma, destination of Ketapang

=== Northern Java lines ===
- Sancaka Utara to Surabaya Pasarturi

=== Agglomeration trains ===
- Kamandaka to Semarang Tawang Bank Jateng
- Joglosemarkerto train to Yogyakarta Station

=== Freight services ===
- Avtur, destination of Rewulu
- Fertilizer, destination of Gembong, Ceper and Maguwo

Preceding station	Kereta Api Indonesia	Following station
Terminus	Cilacap–Kroya	Gumilir towards Kroya
