= Surabaya Gubeng railway station =

Railway station in Indonesia

Surabaya Gubeng railway station Stasiun Surabaya Gubeng PD02 J02 PB01 SP02 A13

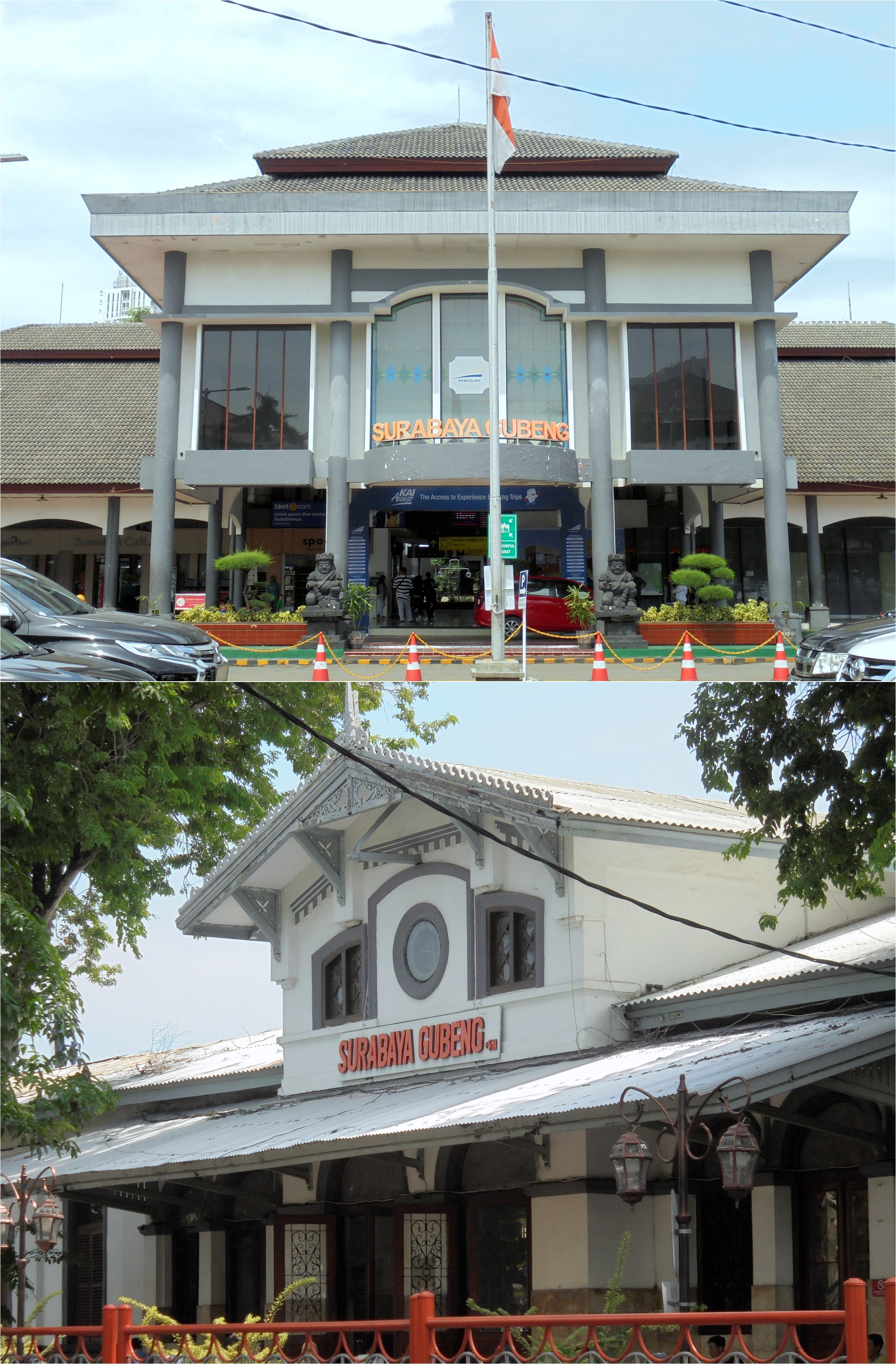
- Front view of the new station building (top) and the old station building (bottom)

General information
- Other names: Gubeng Station
- Location: Jalan Stasiun Gubeng (old building), Jalan Gubeng Masjid (new building), Pacarkeling, Tambaksari, Surabaya; East Java; Indonesia
- Coordinates: 07°15′55″S 112°45′08″E
- Elevation: +5 m (16 ft)
- Owner: Kereta Api Indonesia
- Operator: Kereta Api Indonesia; KAI Commuter
- Lines: Surabaya Railway; Wonokromo–Surabaya Gubeng Railway; Pasarturi–Gubeng Railway
- Platforms: 2 side platform 5 Island platforms
- Tracks: 6
- Connections: Trans Semanggi Suroboyo: K2L

Construction
- Structure type: Ground
- Parking: Available
- Cycle facilities: Bicycle parking
- Accessible: Available
- Architectural style: Neoclasic with touches of Chalet (old building); Modern (new building)

Other information
- Station code: SGU • 4520
- Classification: Large type A

History
- Opened: 16 May 1878; 148 years ago
- Rebuilt: 1905, 1928, 1995
- Former names: Station Goebeng Soerabaja
- Original company: Staatsspoorwegen Oosterlijnen

Services
Preceding station		Following station
Surabaya Pasarturi A14 towards Babat or Bojonegoro	Commuter Line Arjonegoro	Wonokromo A11 towards Sidoarjo
Surabaya Kota SP01 Terminus	Commuter Line Supas	Wonokromo SP04 towards Pasuruan or Probolinggo
Surabaya Pasarturi J01 towards Indro or Babat	Commuter Line Jenggala	Wonokromo J04 towards Mojokerto
Surabaya Kota PD01 One-way operation	Commuter Line Penataran East Java Circular Line (clockwise)	Wonokromo PD04 towards Malang, Blitar, Kertosono or Surabaya Kota
Wonokromo PD04 One-way operation	Commuter Line Penataran East Java Circular Line (clockwise)	Surabaya Kota PD01 Terminus
Surabaya Kota PD01 One-way operation	Commuter Line Dhoho East Java Circular Line (counter-clockwise)	Wonokromo PD04 towards Kertosono, Blitar, Malang or Surabaya Kota
Wonokromo PD04 One-way operation	Commuter Line Dhoho East Java Circular Line (counter-clockwise)	Surabaya Kota PD01 Terminus
Location
- Location within Surabaya

Surabaya Gubeng Station (SGU), known as Stasiun Surabaya Gubeng or Stasiun Gubeng in Indonesian and Spoorwegstation Goebeng Soerabaja during the Dutch East Indies era, is a type A large railway station located at Gubeng Station Street, Pacarkeling, Tambaksari, Surabaya, East Java, Indonesia. This station, which has an elevation of +5 m and is under the management of KAI's Daop VIII Surabaya as well as KAI Commuter, is the biggest railway station in Surabaya and East Java, and serves as the main derparture railway in Surabaya, especially towards the south and east routes of Java, replacing Surabaya Kota Station (except for the Sri Tanjung train), while trains that pass through the northern route of Java, such as major trains going to Jakarta via Semarang, are instead usually departed from Surabaya Pasar Turi Station. The name of the station comes from the Gubeng subdistrict of Surabaya, even though, administratively, the station lies northwest of the subdistrict.

Surabaya Gubeng station was first built on the west side of the railway tracks. In the mid-1990s, new Surabaya Gubeng station building was built on the east side of railway tracks, which are wider and has more modern architecture.

== History ==
=== Colonial era ===
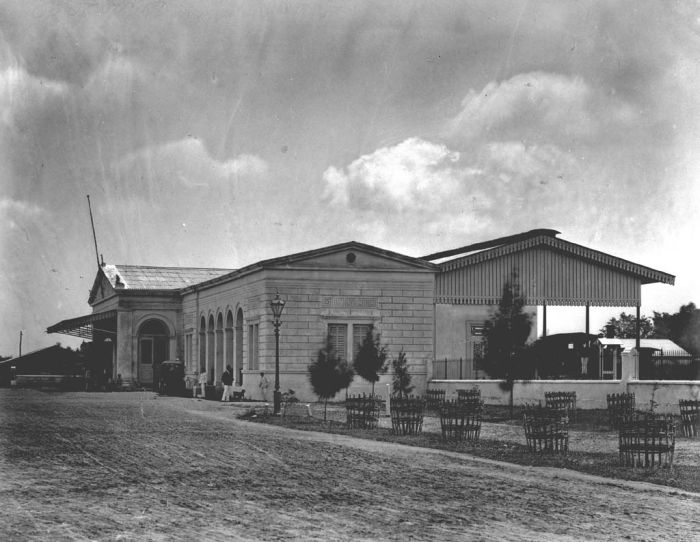
Goebang train station (late 19th century)

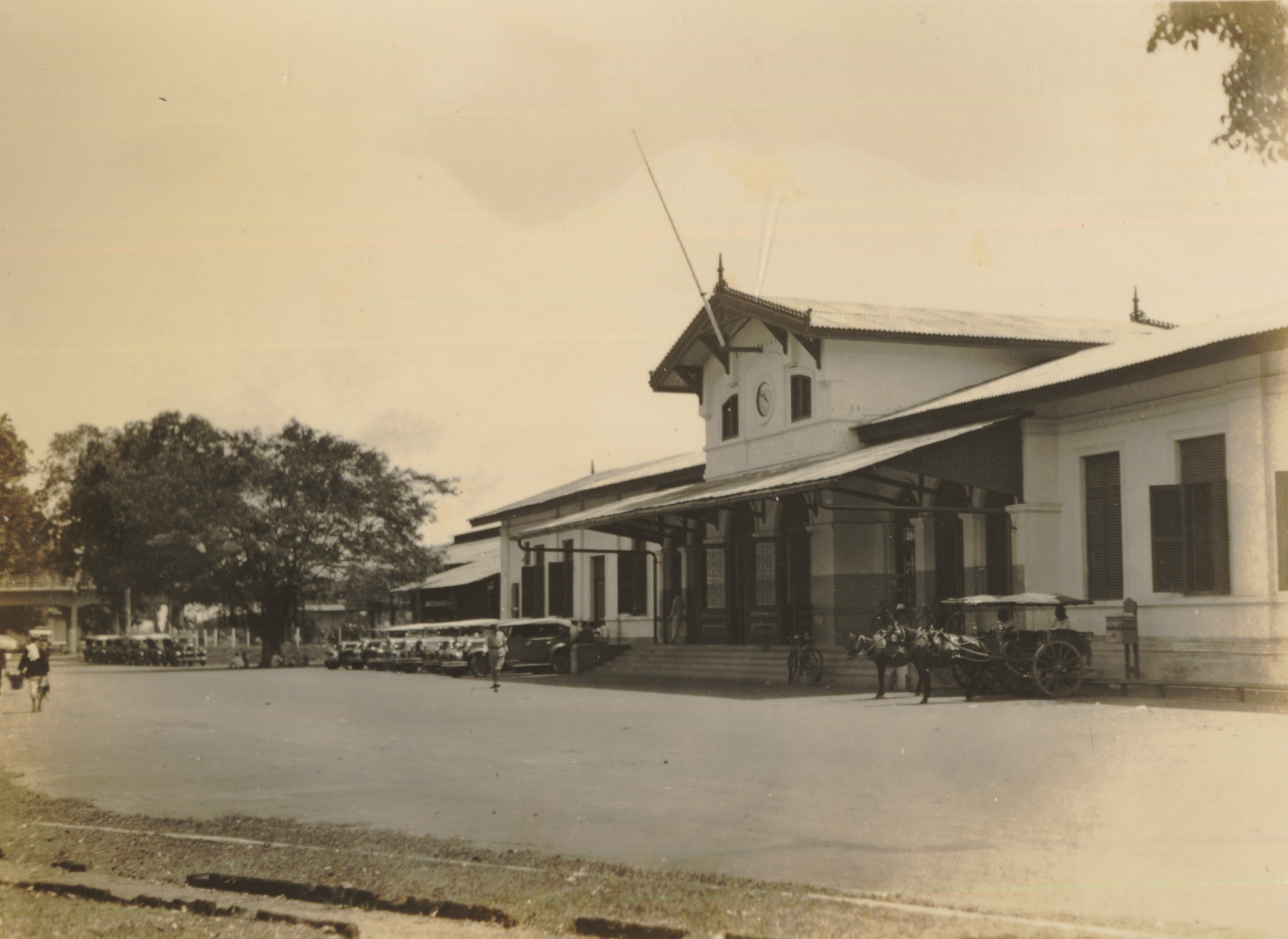
The front view perspective (the photographer facing towards northeast) of the station with a horse-drawn carriage at the front

Surabaya Gubeng Station is one of the railway stations belonging to Staatsspoorwegen which was inaugurated on 16 May 1878 as part of the Surabaya–Pasuruan railway development project. This station was first built on the west side of the railroad.

Initially, the station used a mechanical signaling system, then underwent a system change to electric in the 1970–1980s. On 7 June 1996, a new station building with an area of 13,671 m2 was completed on the east side of the railroad tracks with a more modern and wider architecture — the construction was estimated to cost Rp1.5 billion.

The old station building has also been renovated several times, including the renovation of the platform canopy in 1905 and the main building lobby in 1928. Its style is typical of the SS, namely the Chalet style, an architectural style characterized by solid high walls with roofs decorated with tendril ornaments made by wrought iron, as well as large windows with iron jalousie. The old station building has been designated as a cultural heritage by the Surabaya city government with Surabaya Mayor Decree No. 188.45/251/402.1.04/1996.

Surabaya Gubeng Station once was the station where Indonesia's first President Sukarno worked while studying at the Technische Hoogeschool te Bandoeng (now ITB). At the time, H.O.S. Cokroaminoto, who had become Sukarno's "father-in-law", was thrown into prison by the Dutch colonial government before Sukarno was in Bandung for 3 months. Sukarno used the title Raden Sukarno, B.K.L., der Eerste Klasse Categorie (first rank of first class). He worked as a clerk in the station administration. Sukarno was paid Rp165 per month and Rp125 was given to the Tjokroaminoto family. As H.O.S. Tjokroaminoto was released from prison in April 1922, three months later Sukarno returned to study at THB.

=== Post-colonial era ===
During the war for independence, the area around the station became the headquarters for dozens of armed members of the Indonesian Railways Youth Force (Indonesian: Angkatan Muda Kereta Api or AMKA). They are about 30 people led by Moh. Ali and some were equipped with submachine guns.

== Building and layout ==
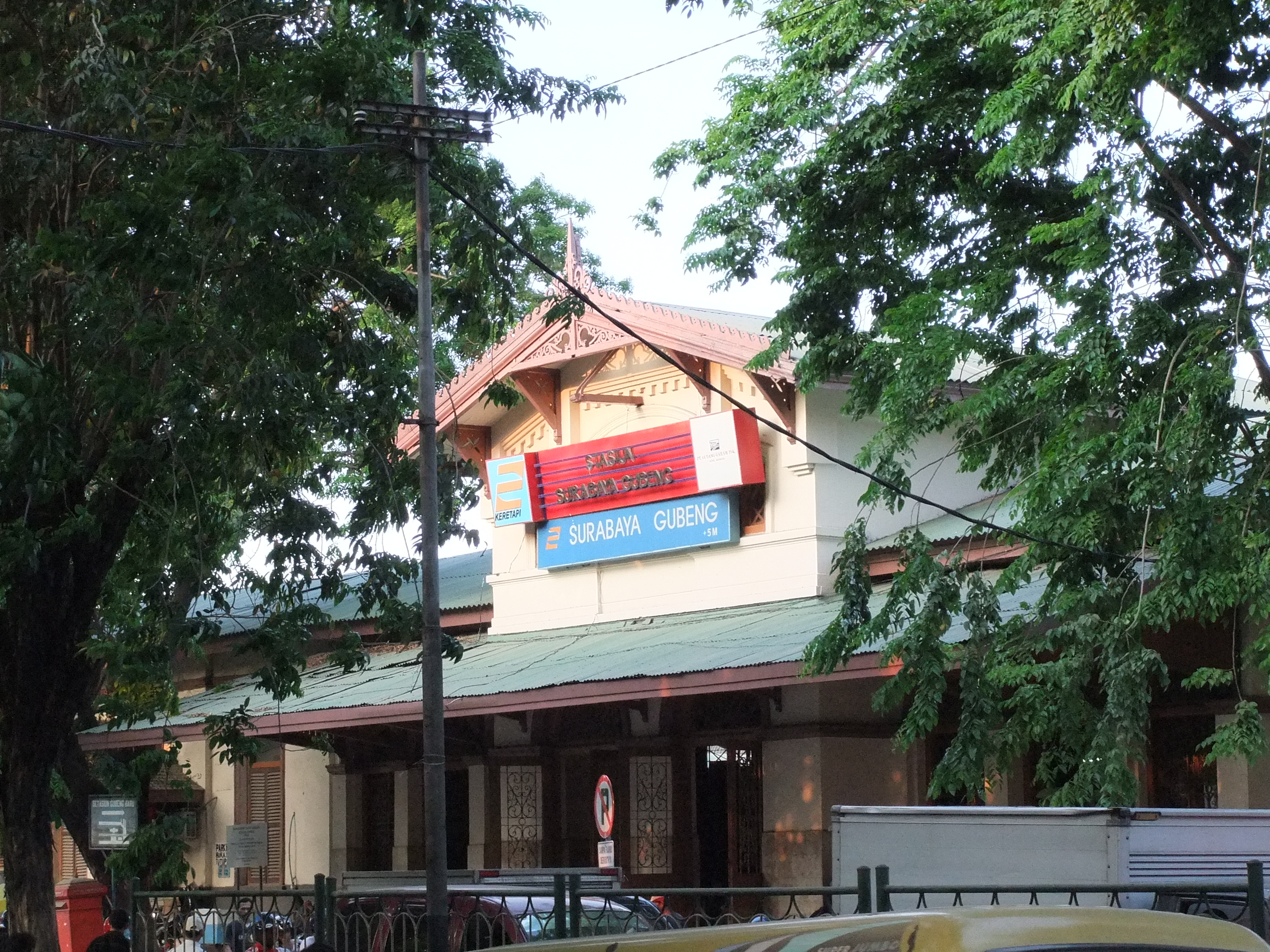
Surabaya Gubeng Station old building in 2009; the building is currently used only for local and commuter train passengers

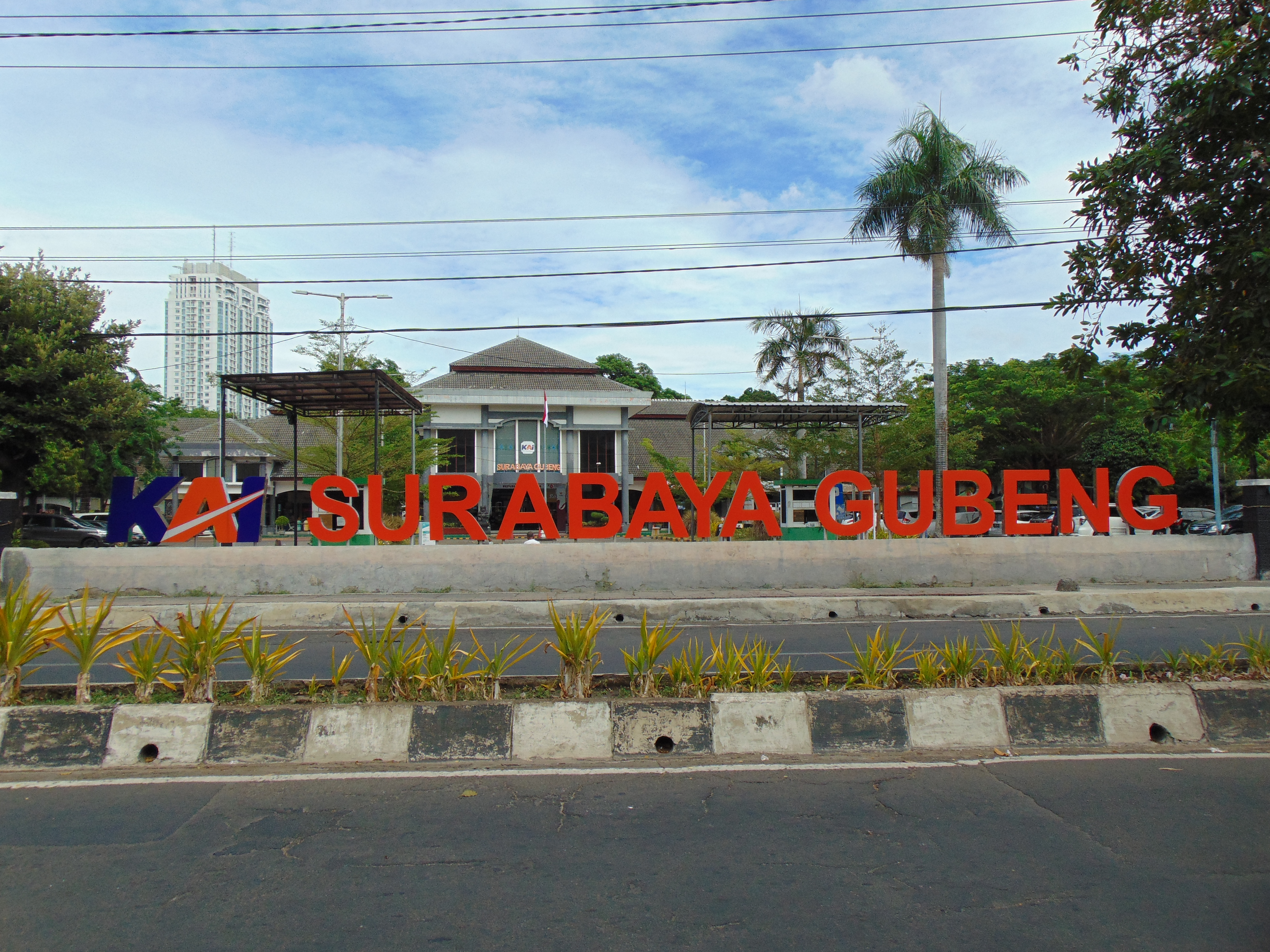
Surabaya Gubeng Station new building which has been in use since 1996, along with raised letters in the front; the building is used for departure and arrival of intercity trains (2021)

In the 1990s, Surabaya Gubeng Station had many railway tracks. However, since the new station building is in use, the number of tracks has been reduced to six. Track 1 (on the westernmost) is a straight track usually for departures of southbound local and commuter trains; track 2 is a straight line for the arrival of local and commuter trains from the south; tracks 3 and 4 are usually for economy-class train stops during the locomotive shutdown process, locomotive or train/carriage parking, and as a track for freight trains; track 5 is a straight line to and from Sidotopo–Benteng for train arrivals and departures when a train stops on track 6 and also serves as a direct running track for freight trains; and track 6 (on the easternmost) for various intercity trains across Java. To the north of track 6 is a spur to Surabaya Gubeng railway workshop.

The station has been equipped with signages to go to certain rooms, track numbers, and certain facilities; as well as track direction signs along with the distance traveled and monitor screens of real-time train departure and arrival information that look like those at an airport. As of 2020, the signages designs has been adjusted to ISO 7001:2007 standards by the 2021 Christmas and New Year season.

== Special Characteristics ==
Initially, the station used a bell melody based on the instrumental song “Rek Ayo Rek.”

By the end of May 2021, Stasiun Surabaya Gubeng introduced a keroncong-style welcome melody titled “Soerabaja,” performed by Sundari Soekotjo, a well-known keroncong singer. The song later became the standard arrival chime for all intercity terminus stations in Surabaya.

The song was originally popularized by the rock-and-roll group Dara Puspita and had already been used as the train arrival melody at Stasiun Surabaya Pasarturi since 2020.

In 2024, the station reverted to using the instrumental melody “Rek Ayo Rek,” but in a newer arrangement, replacing “Soerabaja” as performed by Sundari Soekotjo.

== Services ==
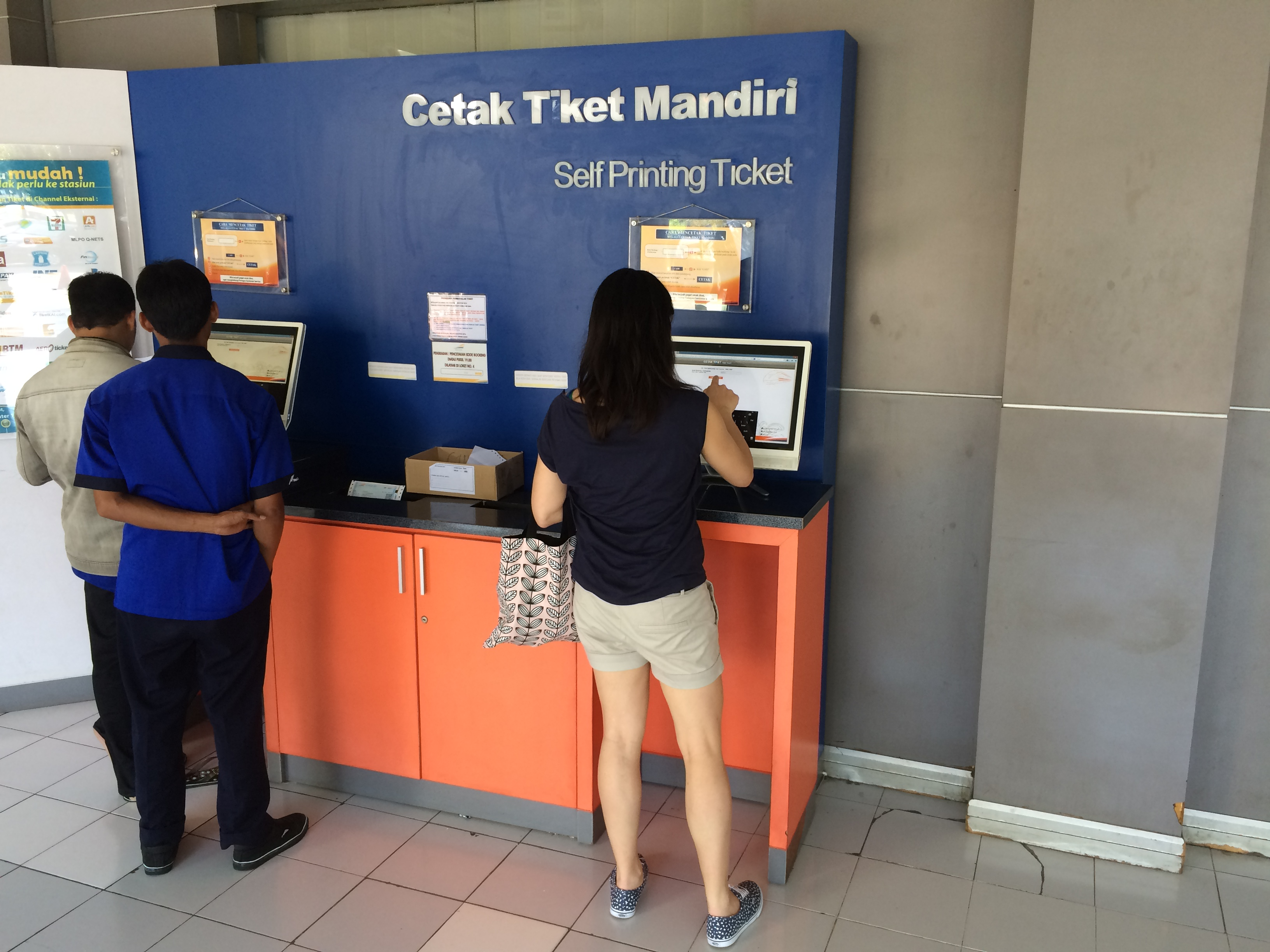
Self-print ticket service in Surabaya Gubeng Station

Passenger trains that use this station are:

- Intercity
  1. Argo Semeru from and to Gambir (1 compartment suite class + 9 newgen executive class)
  2. Argo Wilis from and to Bandung (1 panoramic class + 7 stainless steel executive class)
  3. Arjuno Express from and to Malang (8 executive class)
  4. Bima from and to Gambir (1 compartment suites class + 9 newgen executive class)
  5. Blambangan Express from and to Pasar Senen and Ketapang (5 executive class + 2 newgen modification economy class)
  6. Gayabaru Malam Selatan from and to Pasar Senen (4 newgen executive class + 5 newgen economy class)
  7. Jayabaya from and to Pasar Senen (via Surabaya Pasar Turi-Semarang Poncol) and Malang (4 newgen executive class + 5 newgen economy class)
  8. Jayakarta from and to Pasar Senen via Yogyakarta (14 new image premium economy class)
  9. Logawa from and to Purwokerto and Ketapang (8 stainless steel premium economy class)
  10. Mutiara Selatan from and to Bandung (4 stainless steel executive class + 4 stainless steel premium economy class)
  11. Mutiara Timur from and to Ketapang (4 executive class + 4 newgen modification economy class)
  12. Pandalungan from and to Gambir and Jember (8 stainless steel executive class)
  13. Pasundan from and to Kiaracondong (7 newgen modification economy class)
  14. Probowangi from and to Ketapang (6 106-seat economy class)
  15. Ranggajati from and to Cirebon and Jember (5 executive class + 4 newgen modification economy class)
  16. Sancaka from and to Yogyakarta (4 stainless steel executive class + 5 stainless steel premium economy class)
  17. Sri Tanjung from and to Lempuyangan and Ketapang (6 106-seat economy class)
  18. Turangga from and to Bandung 1 panoramic class + 7 stainless steel executive class)
  19. Wijayakusuma from and to Cilacap and Ketapang (5 executive class + 4 newgen modification economy class)
  20. Sangkuriang from and to Bandung and Ketapang (1 compartment suite class + 4 stainless steel executive class + 3 stainless steel premum economy class)
- Commuter and Local Train
  1. Komuter Surabaya–Bangil to Bangil via Sidoarjo
  2. Supas Commuter Line to Pasuruan via Sidoarjo
  3. Jenggala Commuter Line to Mojokerto
  4. Sindro Commuter Line to Sidoarjo and Indro
  5. Dhoho Commuter Line to Blitar via Kertosono
  6. Penataran Commuter Line to Blitar via Malang
  7. Bojonegoro Local Train to Bojonegoro and Sidoarjo
  8. Kertosono Local Train to Kertosono
  9. Tumapel Commuter Line to Malang

== Supporting transportation ==
Public transportation type	Route	Destination
West side
City bus	A2	Purabaya bus terminal–Surabaya Kota Station
Bemo	F	Joyoboyo intermodal terminal–Pegirian
Bemo	N	Jembatan Merah Plaza–Bratang bus terminal
Bemo	W	Pasar Dukuh Kupang–Pasar Rakyat Karang Menjangan
East side
Bemo	C	Pegirian–Pasar Rakyat Karang Menjangan
Bemo	T2	Joyoboyo intermodal terminal–Sepuluh Nopember Institute of Technology campus (via Mulyosari or Airlangga University campus C)
Bemo	T2	Joyoboyo intermodal terminal–Kenjeran Park
Bemo	W	Pasar Rakyat Karang Menjangan–Pasar Dukuh Kupang
Bemo	WB	Bulak Banteng–Bratang bus terminal
Trans Semanggi Suroboyo	K2L	Raya Lidah Wetan–ITS

== Gallery ==
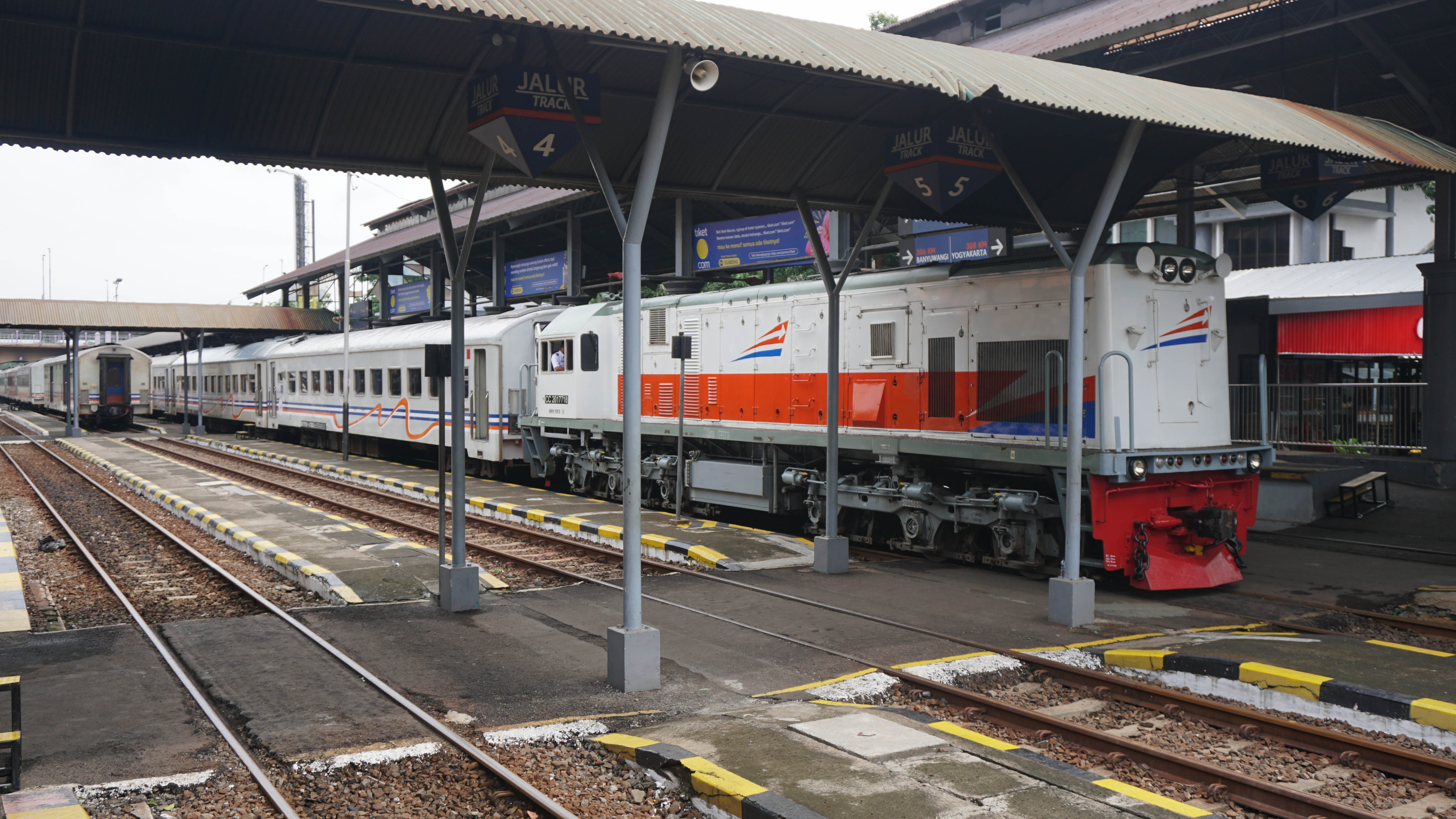
The Ranggajati train at Surabaya Gubeng station

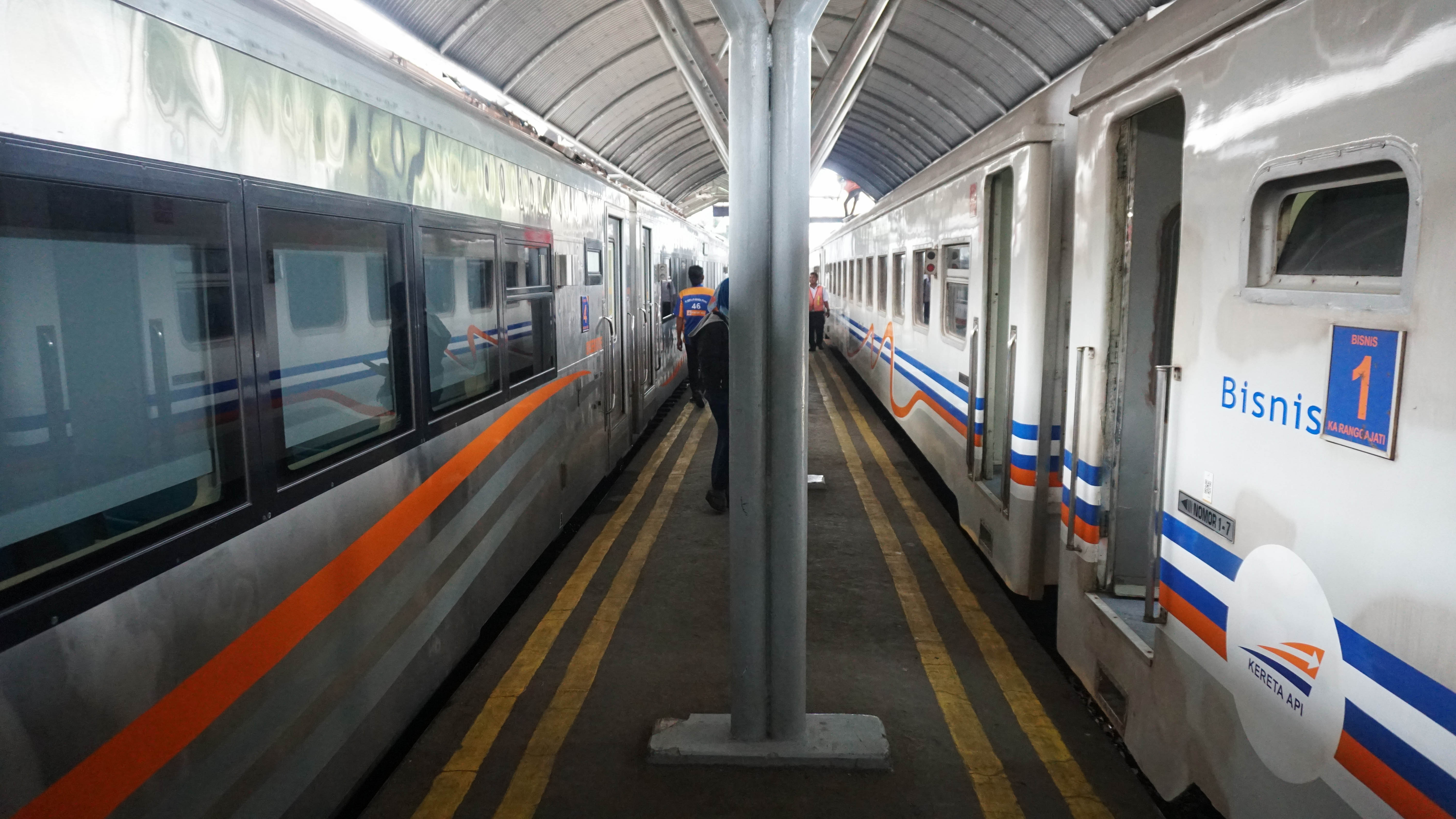
Mutiara Timur (left) and Ranggajati (right) trains at the station platform

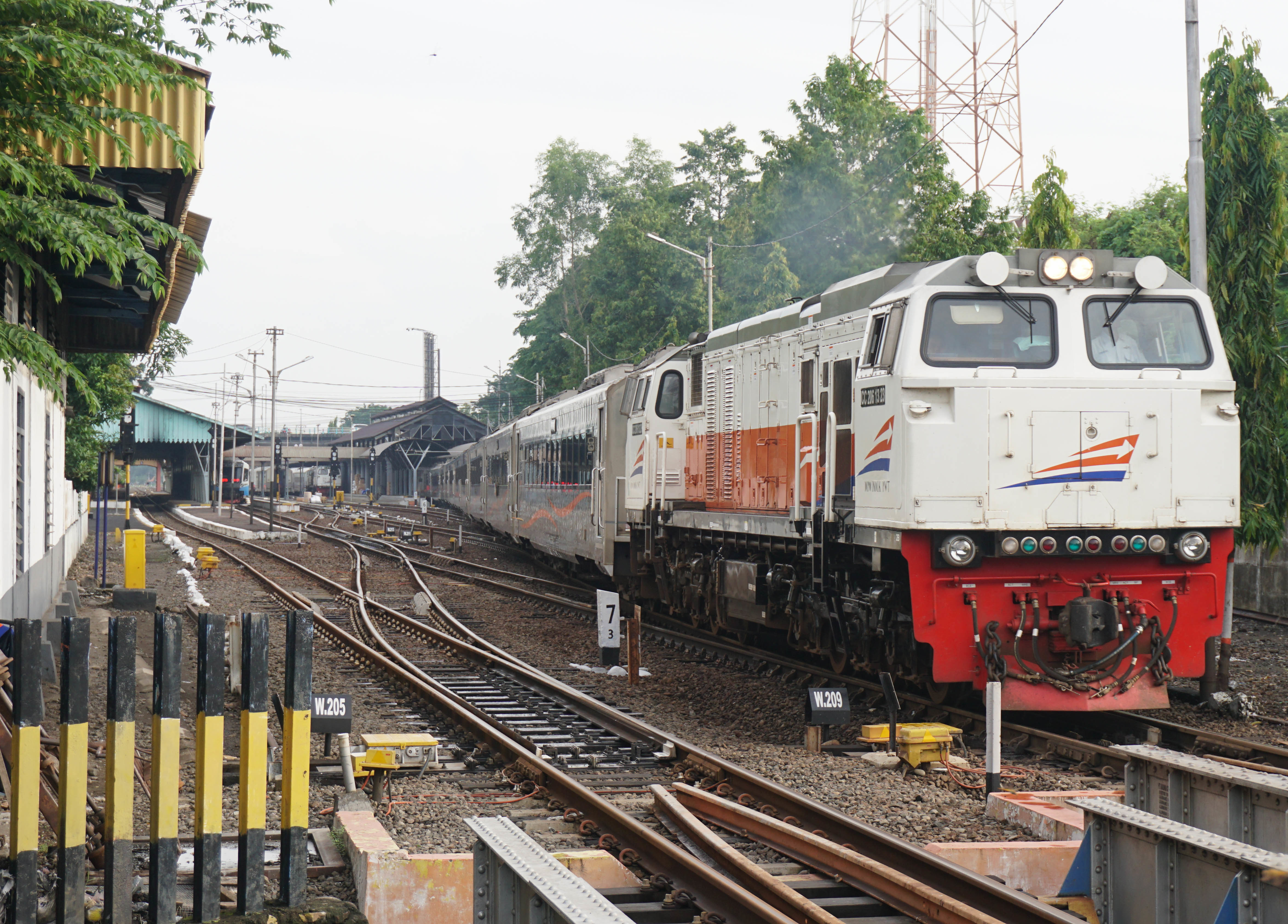
The Argo Wilis train departing from Surabaya Gubeng station

Preceding station	Kereta Api Indonesia	Following station
Surabaya Pasarturi; Terminus	Surabaya Railway; SBI–SGU	Terminus
Ngagel towards Wonokromo	Wonokromo–Surabaya Gubeng Railway; WO–SGU	Terminus
Terminus	Surabaya Railway; SGU–BET	Sidotopo towards Benteng
Terminus	Surabaya Railway; SGU–SB	Surabaya Kota; Terminus
