= Citiis railway bridge =

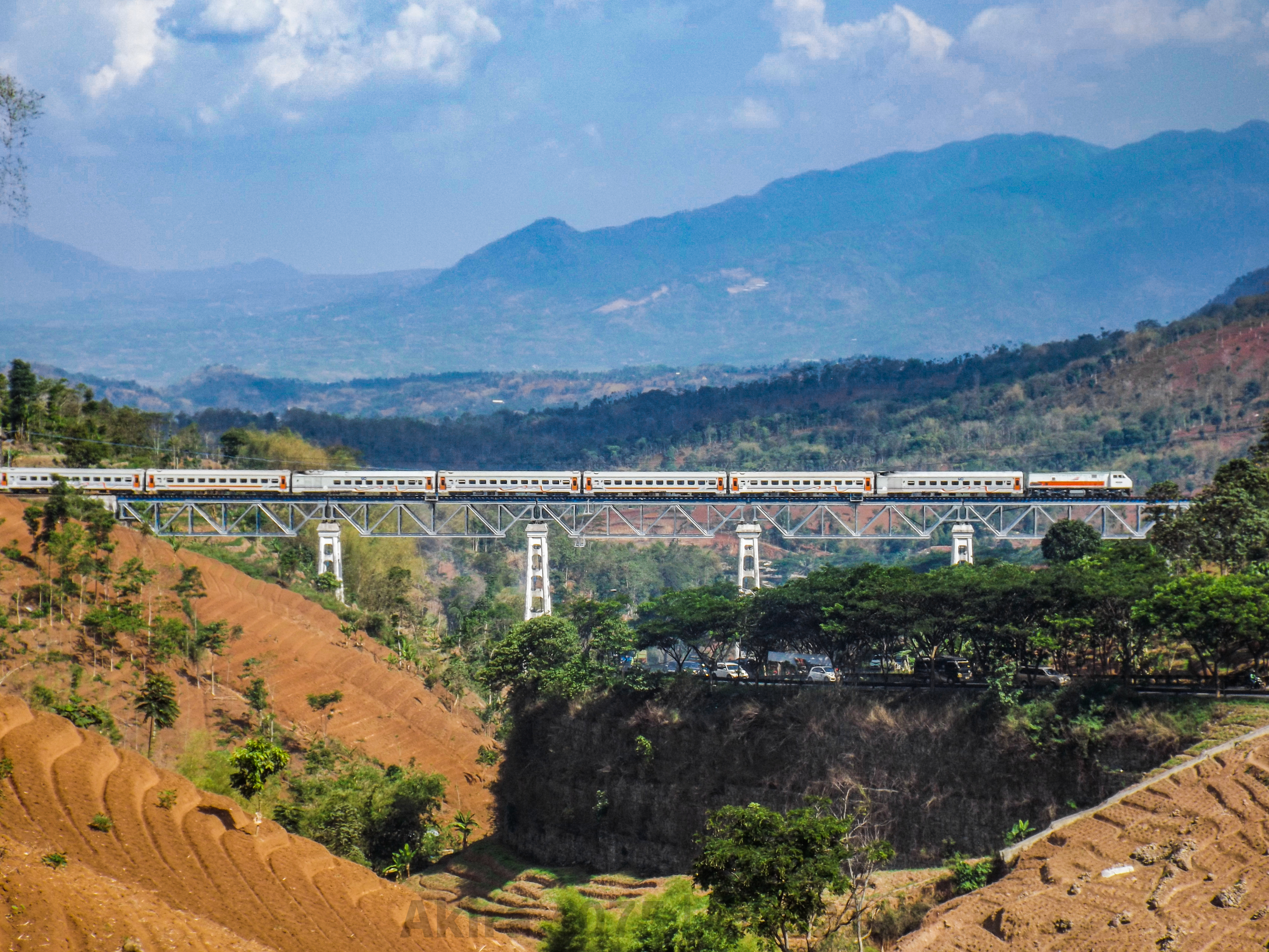
- Serayu passing the Citiis railway bridge to Leles, 2019
- Coordinates: 7°02′12″S 107°53′53″E
- Crosses: Padalarang–Kasugihan
- Locale: Ciherang, Nagreg, Bandung Regency, West Java
- Begins: Nagreg
- Ends: Lebakjero
- Owner: Directorate General of Railways

Characteristics
- Height: 820 meters

Rail characteristics
- Track gauge: 1067 mm

History
- Built: 1889
- Construction start: 1889
- Opened: 1921

Location
- Interactive map of Citiis railway bridge

Citiis railway bridge is a railway bridge that linked between Bandung and Garut, as well as Kroya that located in Ciherang, Nagreg, Bandung Regency, West Java, and stretches over the Cisaat Valley. The Citiis railway bridge also crosses the Nagreg Ring Road below.

== Geography ==
That situation at an altitude of 820 meters above sea level, the Citiis railway bridge is the highest active railway bridge in Indonesia. It was built during the Dutch East Indies colonial era, coinciding with the construction of the Cicalengka–Garut line by the Staatsspoorwegen (SS) in 1889.

== History ==
The Citiis railway bridge's construction was quite challenging, as it had to traverse a steep valley and rocky terrain. The railway bridge was completed on 10 January 1889, and spans 173 meters with five supporting pillars. The iron was imported directly from Europe via the port of Batavia.

In 1921, the Citiis railway bridge was reinforced with 20 tons of reinforcement to increase its bearing capacity.

== Service ==
Here is a train that crossing the Citiis Railway Bridge:

=== Passenger ===
- Executive class
  - Argo Wilis, between Bandung and Surabaya Gubeng
  - Turangga, between Bandung and Surabaya Gubeng
- Mixed class
  - Lodaya, between Bandung and Solo Balapan (executive–economy)
  - Malabar, between Bandung Malang (executive–economy)
  - Mutiara Selatan, between Bandung and Surabaya Gubeng (executive–economy)
  - Pangandaran ,between Gambir and Banjar (executive–economy)
  - Papandayan, between Gambir and Garut (executive–economy)
  - Baturraden Express, between Bandung and Purwokerto (executive–economy)
  - Sangkuriang, between Bandung and Ketapang (executive–economy)
- Economy class
  - Kahuripan, between Kiaracondong and Blitar
  - Kutojaya Selatan, between Kiaracondong and Kutoarjo
  - Pasundan, between Kiaracondong and Surabaya Gubeng
  - Serayu, between Pasar Senen and Purwokerto via Kroya - Kiaracondong - Purwakarta
  - Cikuray, between Pasar Senen and Garut
- Commuter Line
  - Garut Commuter Line

=== Freight ===
- Over Night Services between Surabaya Kota and Bandung

== Incident ==
- On 4 June 2019, the Serayu heading to Purwokerto derailed nearby with the Citiis railway bridge causing delayed train schedule include the Pangandaran & Galunggung train.

== See also ==
- Ciherang railway bridge
- Cirahong railway bridge
