= Leles railway station =

Railway station in Garut Regency, Indonesia

Leles Station Stasiun Leles
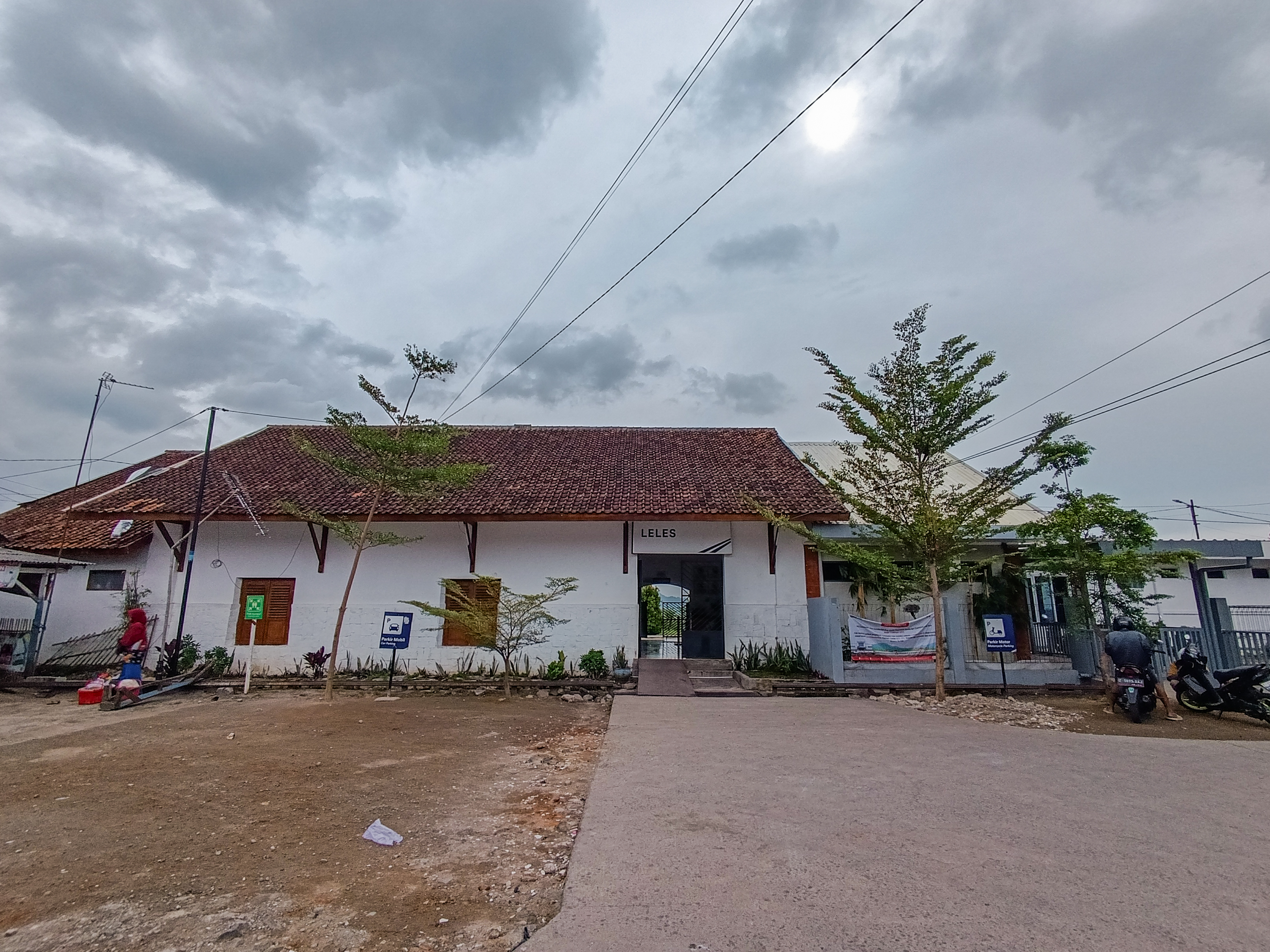
- Outside of Leles Station, February 2025

General information
- Other names: Kadungora Station
- Location: Kadungora, Kadungora, Garut Regency; West Java; Indonesia
- Coordinates: 7°05′04″S 107°53′59″E
- Elevation: +697 m (2,287 ft)
- Owner: Kereta Api Indonesia
- Operator: Kereta Api Indonesia; KAI Commuter
- Lines: Padalarang–Kasugihan; Garut Commuter Line
- Platforms: 2
- Tracks: 2
- Train operators: Kereta Api Indonesia; KAI Commuter

Construction
- Structure type: Ground
- Parking: Available
- Accessible: Available

Other information
- Station code: LL • 1609
- Classification: Class III

History
- Opened: 1890
- Original company: Staatsspoorwegen
Location
- Location within West Java
- Interactive map

Leles Station (LL) (Indonesian: Stasiun Leles, also known as Kadungora Station (Stasiun Kadungora), is a railway station located in Kadungora District, Garut Regency, West Java, Indonesia. It is operated by Kereta Api Indonesia (KAI) together with its subsidiary KAI Commuter as part of Operational Area II Bandung.

== Location ==
The station is situated at an elevation of +697 meters above sea level. Although named after Leles, the station is not actually located in Leles District, but rather to the north of it within the same regency.

On the track between this station and Lebakjero Station is a bend in the shape of horseshoe with a steep gradient of more than one hundred meters. The spot at this bend is often used by railfans and professional photographers who want to capture the moment of a train passing there.

== Services ==
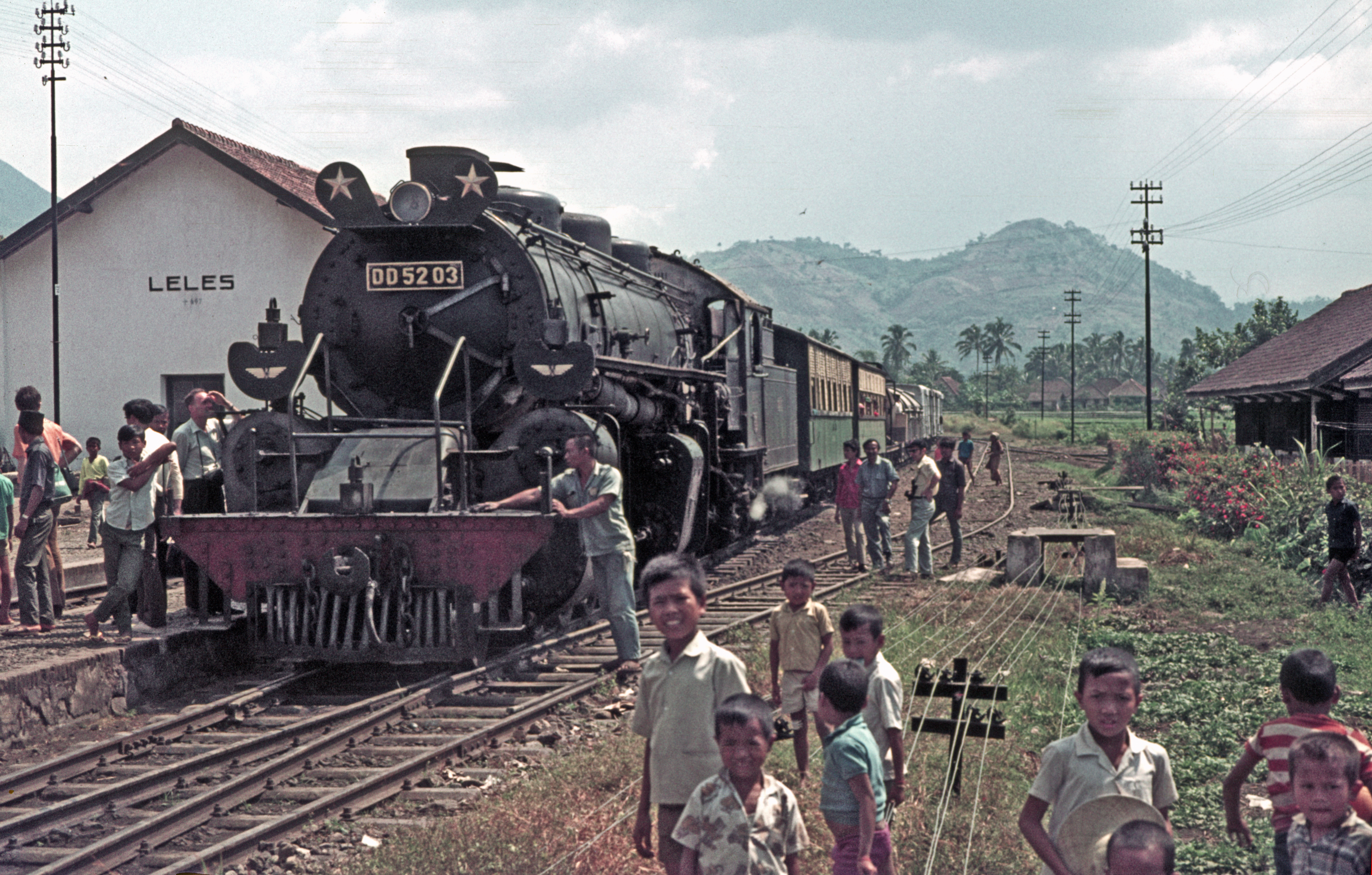
Leles Station, August 1972.

The following is a list of train services at the Leles Station

=== Intercity ===
Trains	Class	Routes		Notes
Mixed
Papandayan	Panoramic	Gambir	Garut	Via Purwakarta–Bandung
Papandayan	Executive	Gambir	Garut	Via Purwakarta–Bandung
Papandayan	Premium Economy	Gambir	Garut	Via Purwakarta–Bandung
Pangandaran	Panoramic	Gambir	Banjar	Via Purwakarta–Bandung
Pangandaran	Executive	Gambir	Banjar	Via Purwakarta–Bandung
Pangandaran	Premium Economy	Gambir	Banjar	Via Purwakarta–Bandung
Malabar	Executive	Bandung	Malang	Via Tasikmalaya–Yogyakarta
Malabar	Premium Economy	Bandung	Malang	Via Tasikmalaya–Yogyakarta
Economy
Kutojaya Selatan (non regular)	Economy	Kiaracondong	Kutoarjo	Via Tasikmalaya–Kroya
Cikuray	Economy (People's economy and Farmer-Trader economy)	Pasar Senen	Garut	Via Cikampek–Kiaracondong
Serayu	Economy	Pasar Senen	Purwokerto	Via Cikampek–Kiaracondong
Pasundan (regular & non regular)	Economy	Kiaracondong	Surabaya Gubeng	Via Tasikmalaya–Lempuyangan
Kahuripan	Economy	Kiaracondong	Blitar	Via Tasikmalaya–Lempuyangan

=== Local trains (Commuter Line) ===
Trains	Routes		Notes
Garut Commuter Line	Garut	Purwakarta	
Garut Commuter Line	Garut	Padalarang	

== Intermodal support ==
The following is a list of public transport routes serving Leles Station

Public transport type	Line	Destination
Angkot	10	Terminal Guntur–Kadungora

== Incidents ==
- On 15 October 1951, from 20.00 to 23.00 (UTC+7), there was a shootout between the Indonesian National Armed Forces and a gang believed to be affiliated with Darul Islam (DI/TII) around Leles Station. As a result, the station building was damaged.

Preceding station	Kereta Api Indonesia	Following station
Lebakjero towards Padalarang	Padalarang–Kasugihan	Karangsari towards Kasugihan
