= Papandayan (train) =

Passenger train service between Jakarta and Garut via Bandung, Indonesia

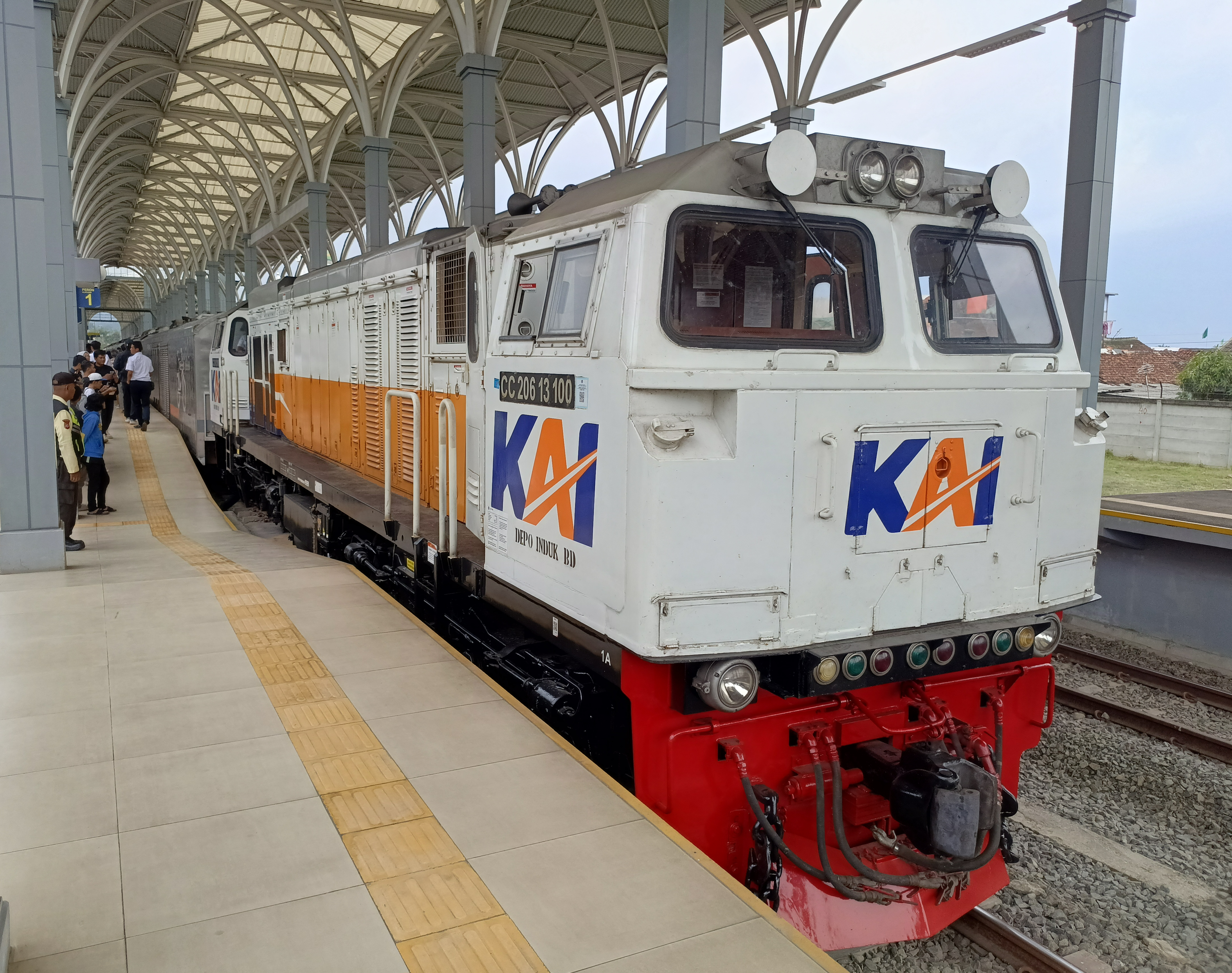
- Papandayan ready for departure to Gambir during inauguration, January 2024

Overview
- Service type: Inter-city rail
- Status: Operational
- First service: 3 March 2009
- Current operator: Kereta Api Indonesia

Route
- Termini: Jakarta Gambir; Garut
- Distance travelled: 246,7 km (152,8 mil)
- Average journey time: 5 hours 15 minutes
- Service frequency: 1x daily everyday (morning schedule from Gambir to Garut & noon/afternoon schedule from Garut to Gambir)
- Train number: 129-130

On-board services
- Classes: executive, premium economy, & panoramic
- Seating arrangements: 50 seats arranged 2–2 (executive) seats can recline and rotate; 80 seats arranged 2-2 (premium economy class); 38 seats arranged 2-2 (panoramic) seats can recline and rotate
- Catering facilities: On-board cafe and trolley service

Technical
- Rolling stock: CC206
- Track gauge: 1067 mm
- Operating speed: 55-120 km/h (34-75 mph)
Route map
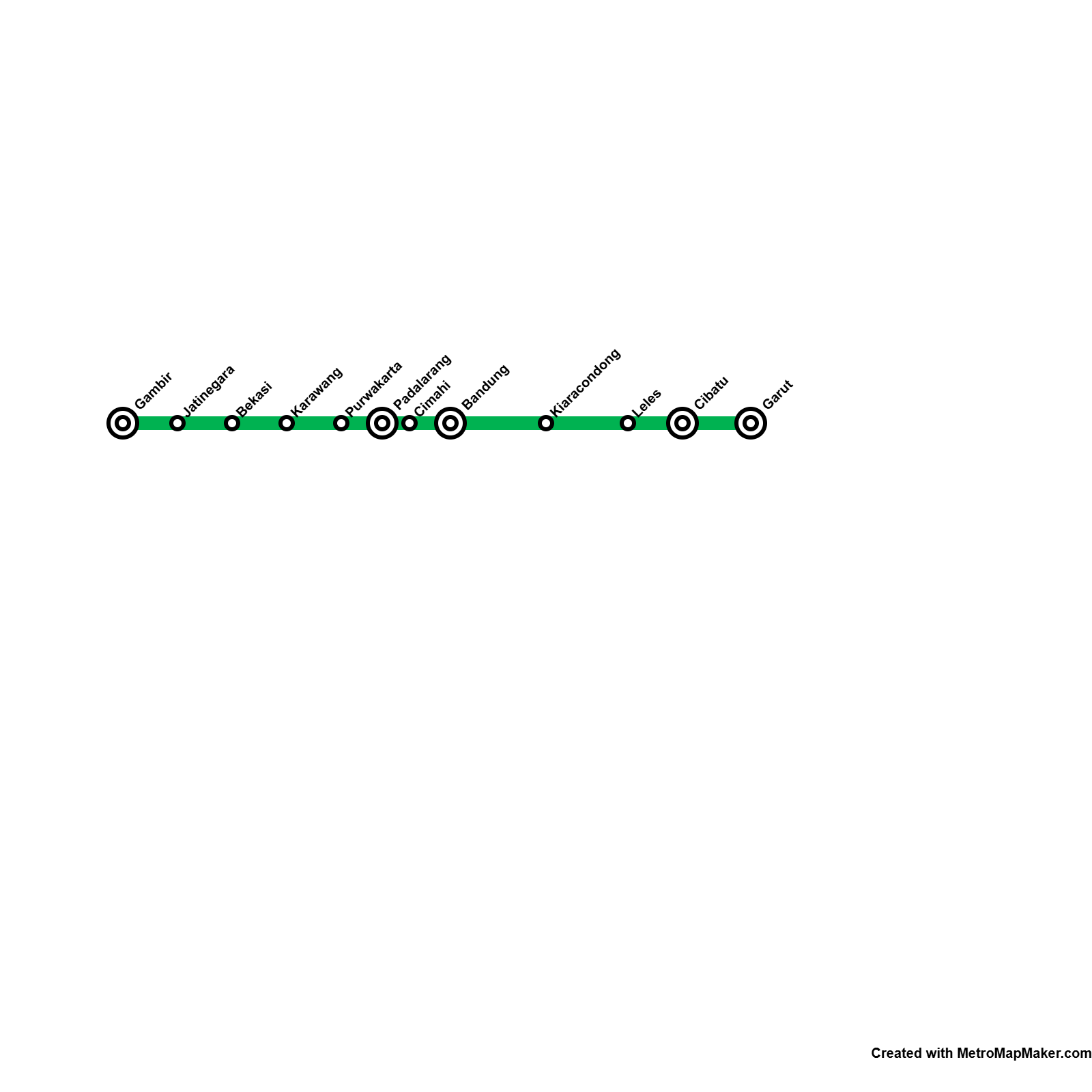

Papandayan train is an mixed class passenger train with executive, premium economy, & panoramic class that operated by Kereta Api Indonesia which run between Jakarta Gambir & Garut via Bandung (then continued to Cikajang if Garut-Cikajang rail line completed by the Government of West Java). This train offer 1x daily everyday, morning schedule from Jakarta Gambir to Garut & noon/afternoon schedule from Garut to Jakarta Gambir around 246,7 km (152,8 mil) in 5 hours 15 minutes.

The Papandayan train which start operation on 24 January 2024 with the Pangandaran which from Jakarta Gambir to Banjar.

== Name ==
The Papandayan name itself comes from the stratovolcano located in Cisurupan, Garut Regency, West Java: Mount Papandayan.

== History ==
A train service called "Papandayan" was actually planned since 3 March 2009. However, at that time, Papandayan was planned to operate serving the route from Bandung to Cirebon via Cikampek. Due to opposition from other transportation operators on the same route and the Department of Transportation (Dishub), the train was cancelled.

Following the reactivation of the Cibatu–Cikajang railway, KAI operated a subsidized economy class train service under the name Cikuray and the extension of the Commuter Line Garut to Garut.

Before the Papandayan train, the Gambir-Garut train route was actually listed in the 2021 of the enactment of new train travel chart 2021, but this train route was changed to the Pasar Senen-Garut route with the name Cikuray train which was operated on 25 March 2022, so the Gambir-Garut route had to find another train name until 2024. As of 24 January 2024, KAI added a travel route to Garut using a mixed class from Gambir with the name Papandayan (along with the operation of the morning schedule Malabar) when the enactment of new train travel chart 2023 was ongoing.

The Pangandaran and Papandayan were share with the Parahyangan the use of stainless steel bodied trains; consisting of three executive class trains, four premium economy class trains, one dining car, and one generator train, plus one panoramic train which uses stainless steel facilities which from PT INKA.

However, on 1 August 2025, the Pangandaran & Papandayan train with use Panoramic car were while adding Priority class to replace Panoramic class, which will could enter maintenance at Train depot.

Finally, on 1 September 2025, the Papandayan & Pangandaran train return use with the Panoramic car after 1 month for maintenance of the Panoramic car.

== List of the Station ==
On 1 February 2025 following of the enactment of new train travel chart 2025, the Papandayan train rolling system with the Pangandaran train that which from Jakarta Gambir to Banjar, but on 1 August 2025, the Papandayan & Pangandaran train with Panoramic car was replace to Priority for temporarily.

- Jakarta Gambir (Start/End)
- Jatinegara
- Bekasi
- Karawang
- Purwakarta
- Padalarang
- Cimahi
- Bandung
- Kiaracondong
- Leles
- Cibatu
- Garut (Start/End)

== Accident & Incident ==
- On 24 January 2024 right on the inauguration of the Papandayan train, A resident suspected of being deaf was killed after being hit by a Papandayan train. The collision occurred between Wanaraja and Garut stations. According to eyewitnesses, the victim was sitting on the tracks and didn't respond to the train's horn.

== See also ==
- Mount Papandayan
- Pangandaran
- Parahyangan
- Argo Wilis
- Lodaya
- Kereta Api Indonesia
- Cikuray
