= Panoramic coach (Indonesia) =

Indonesian passenger train

Panoramic
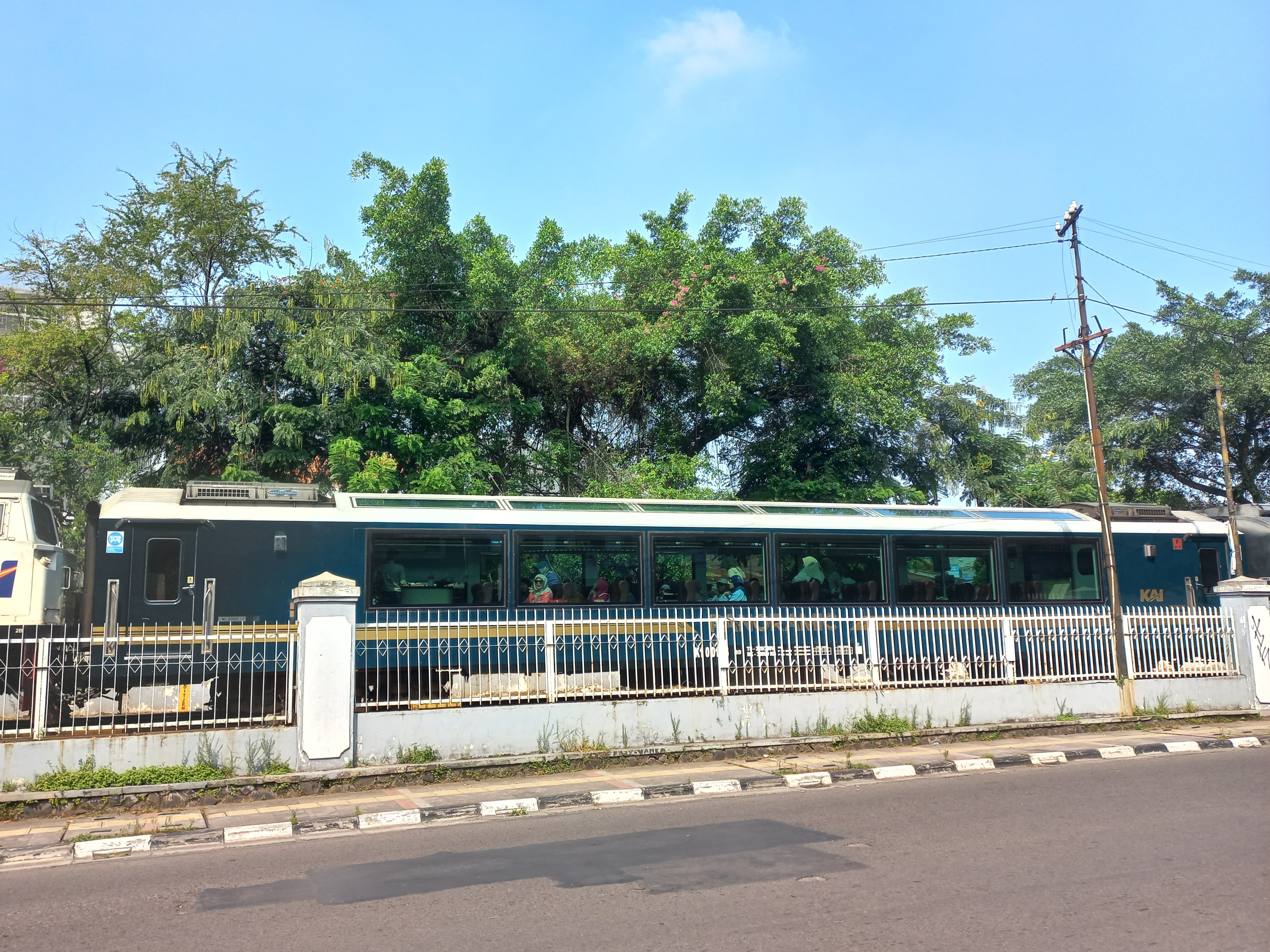
- Panoramic used by the Papandayan, 2025

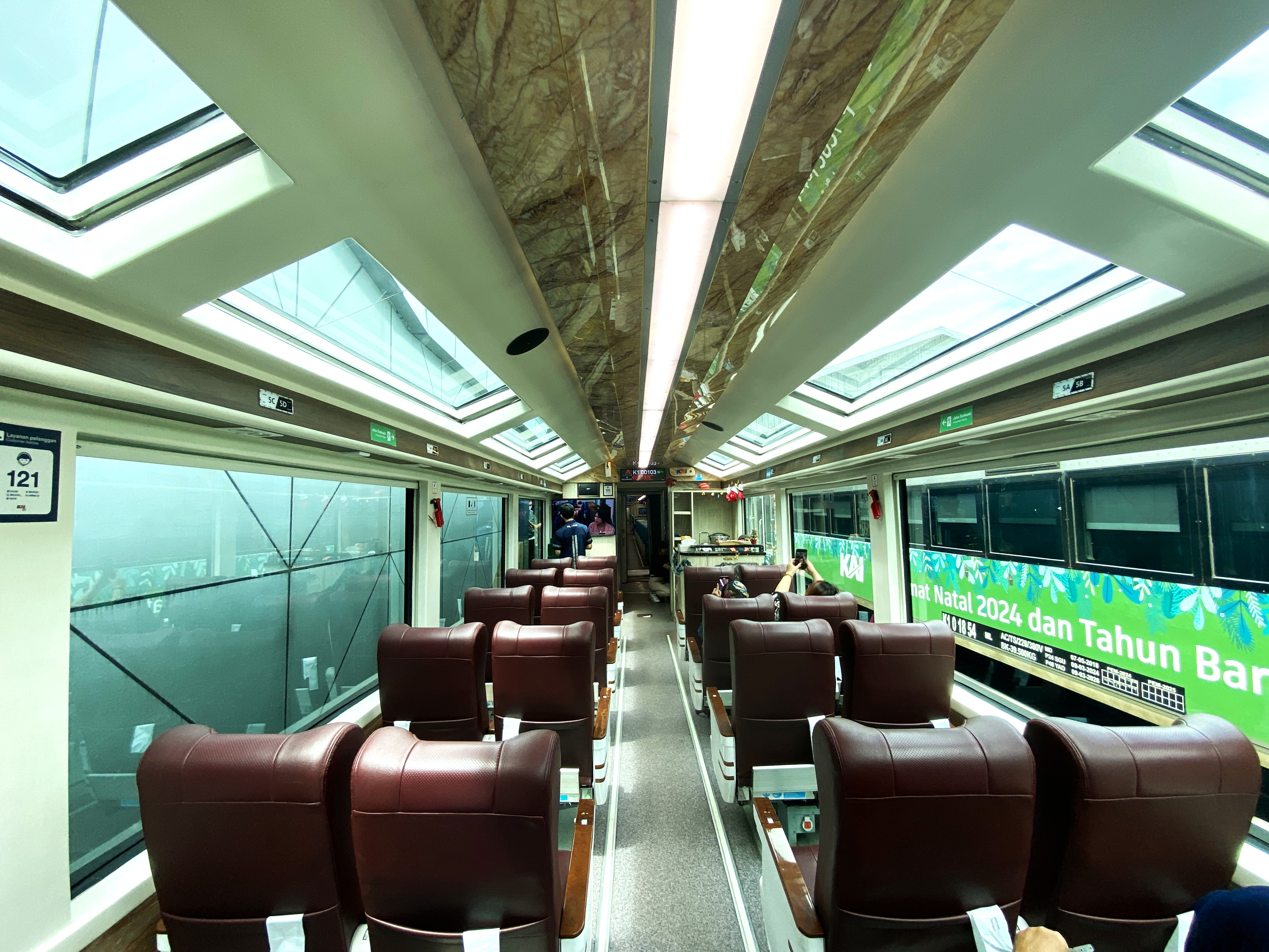
- Panoramic Interior in the Parahyangan
- Stock type: passenger railroad car
- In service: 2022–present
- Manufacturers: PT Kereta Api Indonesia (assembled using 1999 and 2001 executive trains produced by PT INKA)
- Assembly: Surabaya Gubeng railway workshop
- Constructed: 2022 (batch 1); 2023 (batch 2); 2025 (batch 3)
- Entered service: 25 September 2022
- Fleet numbers: batch 1 = K1 0 99 16 + K1 0 01 11; batch 2 = K1 0 01 03 + K1 0 01 06 + K1 0 01 08 + K1 0 01 09; batch 3 = K1 0 02 32 + K1 0 02 23 + K1 0 02 13 + K1 0 02 25 + K1 0 02 38
- Owner: Kereta Api Indonesia
- Operator: KAI Wisata
- Depot: Bandung (BD)

Specifications
- Car body construction: Light steel
- Car length: 20,920 mm (22 yd 2 ft 8 in)
- Width: 2,990 mm (3 yd 0 ft 10 in)
- Height: 3,810 mm (4 yd 0 ft 6 in)
- Floor height: 1,000 mm (1 yd 0 ft 3 in)
- Entry: Compatible high platform
- Doors: A pair on each side
- Wheel diameter: 774 mm (2 ft 6.5 in)
- Wheelbase: 14,000 mm (15 yd 0 ft 11 in)
- Maximum speed: 120 km/h (75 mph)
- Weight: 35,200 kilograms (77,600 lb)
- Axle load: 8,800 kilograms (19,400 lb)
- UIC classification: 2'2'
- Bogies: TB 1014
- Braking system: Compressed air (Westinghouse)
- Coupling system: Janney
- Seating: 38 seats arranged 2-2 seats can recline and rotate
- Track gauge: 1067 mm

Panoramic train is a large-glass sunroof passenger train which is a modification of the executive train by the Surabaya Gubeng in 2022. The Panoramic train service is operated by PT Kereta Api Indonesia and its subsidiary, KAI Wisata. Currently, panoramic train used by the Argo Wilis-Turangga (Bandung-Surabaya Gubeng), Parahyangan (Gambir-Bandung), Papandayan (Gambir-Garut), and Pangandaran (Gambir-Banjar).

== History ==
While the panoramic observation coach has been a Java-only operation, a prototype service, using a refurbished economy class CR/CDR 7000 coach, operated in the 1990s in KAI's West Sumatra Division 2 lines.

The modern prototype "Panoramic" class observation coach was introduced to the public on 25 September 2022, at an open house event at the Surabaya Gubeng station. According to Joni Martinus, Public Relations Officer of PT KAI, the panoramic open passenger coach was designed to meet the needs of tourists seeking a more expansive view of Java's natural landscapes via the railway. By modifying an old executive class coach, the Manggarai depot maintenance crew, together with employees of Industri Kereta Api, transformed the coach's walls into wider glass panels similar to those used in Switzerland, India, the US, and Canada.

== Design ==
This coach has a capacity of 38 seats, with large, see-through glass windows on both sides and a roof that extends from front to back with an automatic opening and closing system for more freedom for passengers to enjoy the scenery. It also features a sunroof. The facilities on this coach include luggage racks, mini bar, air conditioner sets (AC), television, electric plugs, blankets, pillows, soft seats that can be adjusted as desired and Wi-Fi, in addition to a complementary free heavy meal and snack offered to passengers.

The "Panoramic" coach is present as part of the consist of intercity train services on KAI Limited's southern Java mainline, namely the Parahyangan train serving the Gambir–Bandung route, the Papandayan, on the Gambir–Garut route, the Pangandaran serving Gambir–Banjar, and the Argo Wilis and the Turangga services plying Bandung–Surabaya Gubeng.

KAI Wisata, a subsidiary of KAI in the railway-based tourism sector, also provides Panoramic coach rentals for tourism purposes across both the northern and southern Java lines, with the latter taking priority as it is where the coaches do always operate.

== Service ==
Currently the Panoramic coach is available in 4 to 5 long distance express trainsets operated by KAI Ltd:

- Argo Wilis and Turangga, between Bandung and Surabaya Gubeng
- Parahyangan, between Gambir and Bandung
- Papandayan, between Gambir and Garut
- Pangandaran, between Gambir and Banjar

== See also ==
- Argo Wilis
- Turangga
