= Pangandaran (train) =

Executive and premium economy class train in Indonesia

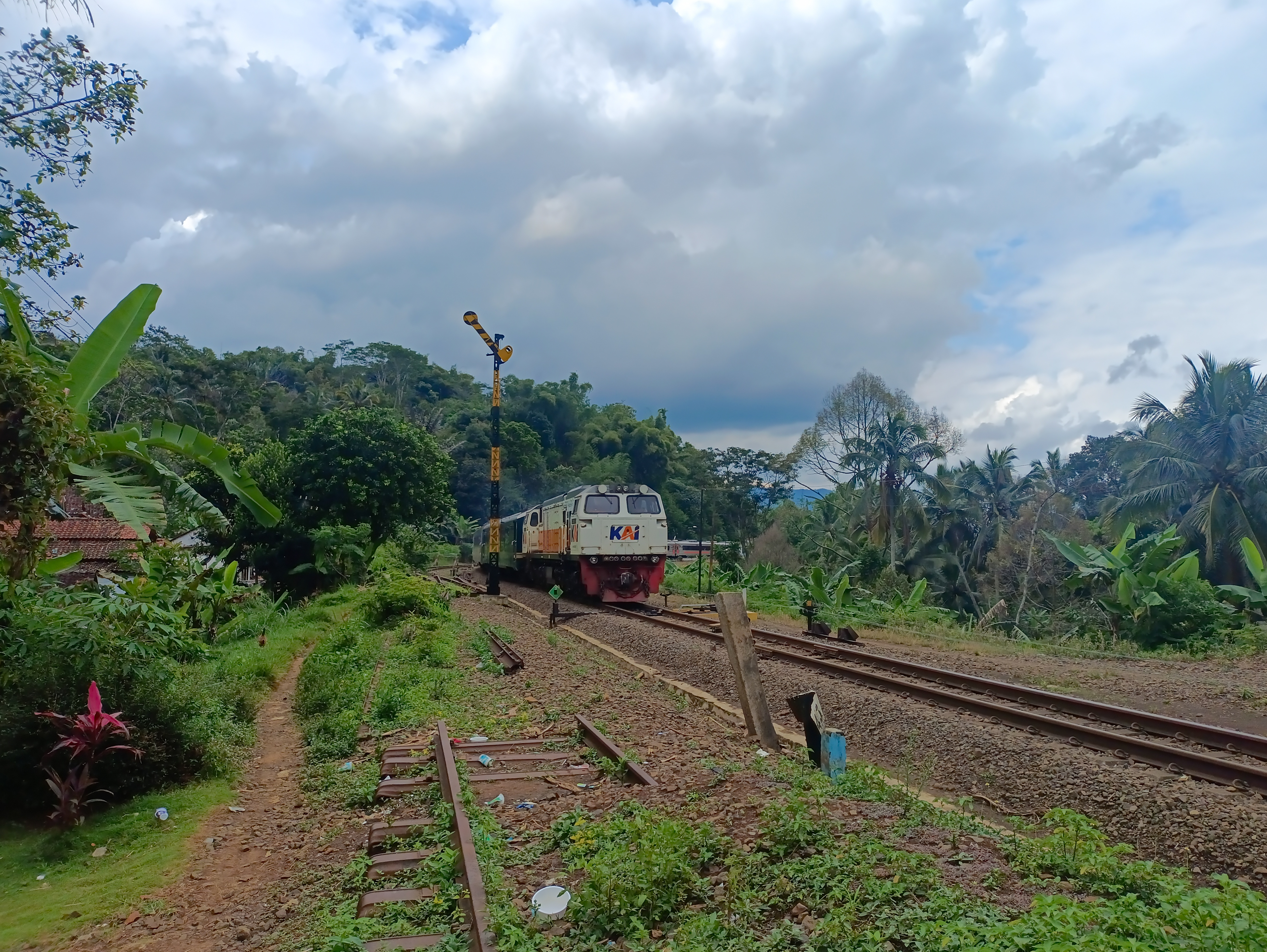
- Pangandaran train 128 passing Cirahayu, April 2025

Overview
- Service type: Inter-city rail
- Status: Operational
- Predecessor: Priangan Express (2009)
- First service: 2 January 2019
- Current operator: Kereta Api Indonesia

Route
- Termini: Gambir; Banjar
- Distance travelled: 325 km (202 mi)
- Average journey time: 7 hours 54 minutes
- Service frequency: Daily (morning schedule from Gambir to Banjar; evening schedule from Banjar to Gambir)
- Train number: 127–128

On-board services
- Classes: Executive, Premium Economy, and Panoramic
- Seating arrangements: 50 seats arranged 2–2 (Executive) seats can recline and rotate; 80 seats arranged 2–2 (Premium Economy); 38 seats arranged 2–2 (Panoramic) seats can recline and rotate
- Catering facilities: On-board cafe and trolley service

Technical
- Rolling stock: CC206
- Track gauge: 1067 mm
- Operating speed: 55–120 km/h (34–75 mph)
Route map

Pangandaran train is a mixed-class passenger train that includes executive, premium economy, and panoramic carriages that is operated by Kereta Api Indonesia, running between Jakarta Gambir and Banjar via Bandung with the plan for it to be continued to Pangandaran once the Pangandaran rail line is completed by the Government of West Java. The train runs once daily and offers a morning schedule from Jakarta Gambir to Banjar and an evening/night schedule from Banjar to Jakarta Gambir, covering around 325 km (201 mies) in 7 hours and 54 minutes for the travel.

The Pangandaran train itself takes its name from Pangandaran beach in Southern Java. However, for the journey to Pangandaran, passengers must travel with another vehicle after arriving at Banjar to reach the final destination.

== History ==
=== Priangan Express (2009) ===
Initially, there was a train service on the same route, namely the Priangan Express, which began operating on 12 August 2009. However, the Priangan Express train was ceased on 1 December 2009 due to low passenger occupation, and therefore it didn't cover operating costs- the small number of passengers was thought to be due to the departure time from the starting station being inconvenient for the public at the time.

=== Pangandaran train (2019–2021) ===
On 2 January 2019, Kereta Api Indonesia launched the Pangandaran train with executive and premium economy stainless steel carriages manufactured by PT INKA. The Pangandaran train served the route from Jakarta Gambir to Banjar via the Parahyangan mountainous region.

During the COVID-19 pandemic in Indonesia, the Pangandaran train was one of the trains whose operations were temporarily suspended due to the spread of the virus. Since the enactment of KAI's new train travel chart (Gapeka) schedule on 10 February 2021, this train service has only operated as a facultative train, meaning that it only ran at specific times. During the enactment of the 2021 Gapeka schedule, this train was not actually operational.

=== Pangandaran (2024–present) ===
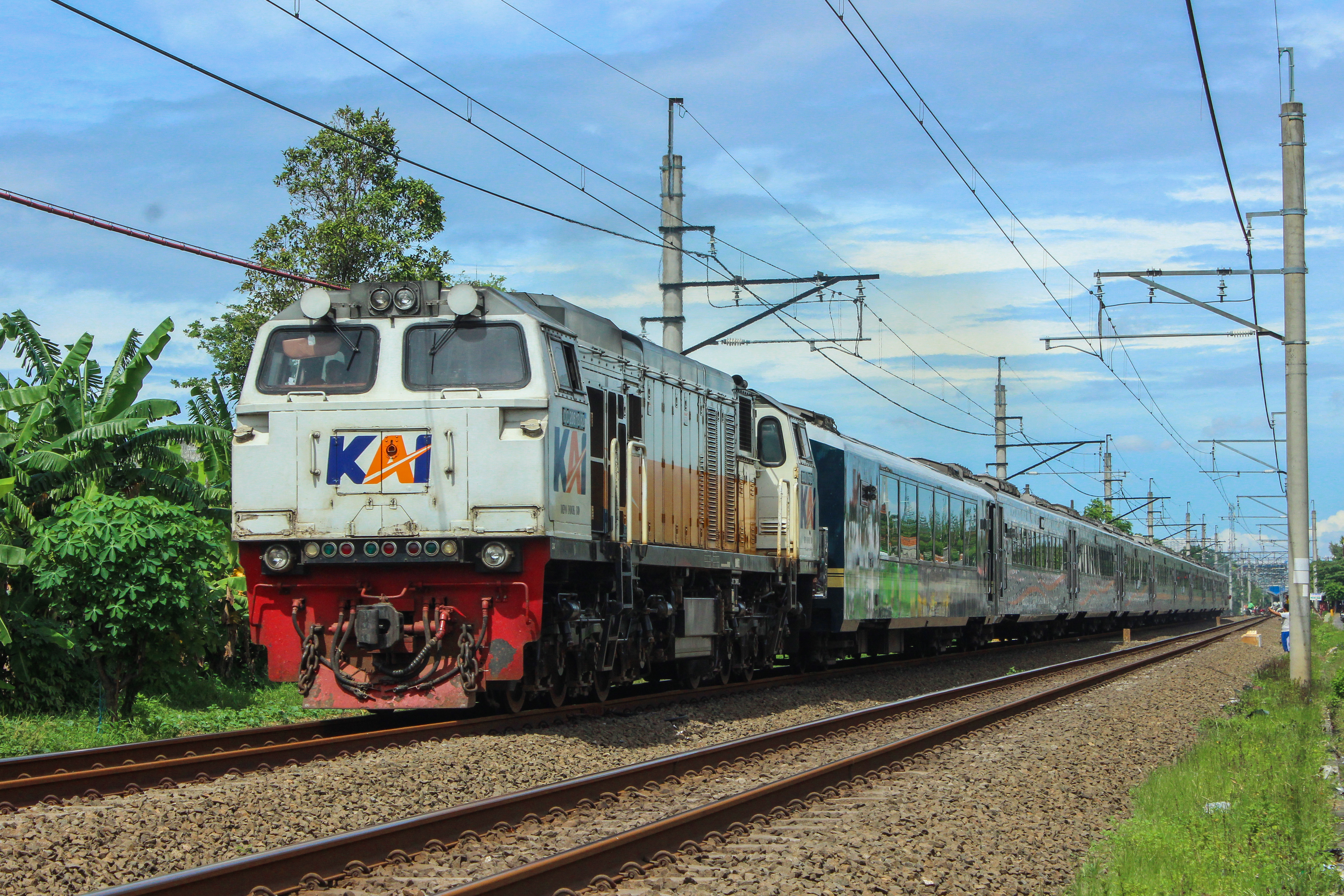
Pangandaran train heading to Banjar, 2024

Then, since the enactment of KAI's new train travel chart 2023, the travel status of this train changed to an additional train.

In September 2023, Public Relations of Operation Area 2 Bandung, Mahendro, revealed that the regional government in the East Priangan region [had] proposed the resumption of the executive train route from Jakarta to their region. He said that the regional governments in question were likely the Tasikmalaya Regency, Tasikmalaya, Ciamis, and Banjar City.

On 24 January 2024, the Pangandaran returned to operation as a regular train as a response to the regional government throughout the East Priangan region. Finally, the Pangandaran train was back by KAI after a four-year suspension due to the COVID-19 pandemic, but unlike the previous class, a panoramic car was added to the train for the route to Banjar from Jakarta.

The Pangandaran and Papandayan share the use of stainless-steel-bodies trains with the Parahyangan. The consist includes three executive class trains, four premium economy class trains, one dining car, and one generation car, plus one panoramic train which uses stainless steel facilities.

However, on 1 August 2025, the Pangandaran and Papandayan trains, which used the Panoramic car, temporarily replaced the Panoramic class with a Priority class while the Panoramic class car was undergoing maintenance at the train depot.

Finally, on 1 September 2025, the Pangandaran and Papandayan trains returned to using the Panoramic car after one months of maintenance to this car.

== Stations ==
Since 1 February 2025, following the enactment of the 2025 train travel chart, the Pangandaran train shares a rolling stock rotation with the Papandayan (Gambir–Garut).

- Jakarta Gambir (Start/End)
- Jatinegara
- Bekasi
- Karawang
- Purwakarta
- Padalarang
- Cimahi
- Bandung
- Kiaracondong
- Leles
- Cibatu
- Cipeundeuy
- Tasikmalaya
- Ciamis
- Banjar (Start/End)

== See also ==
- Parahyangan
- Argo Wilis
- Turangga
- Lodaya
- Malabar
- Papandayan
- Kereta Api Indonesia
