= Cikuray (train) =

Economy class train service in Indonesia

Cikuray train

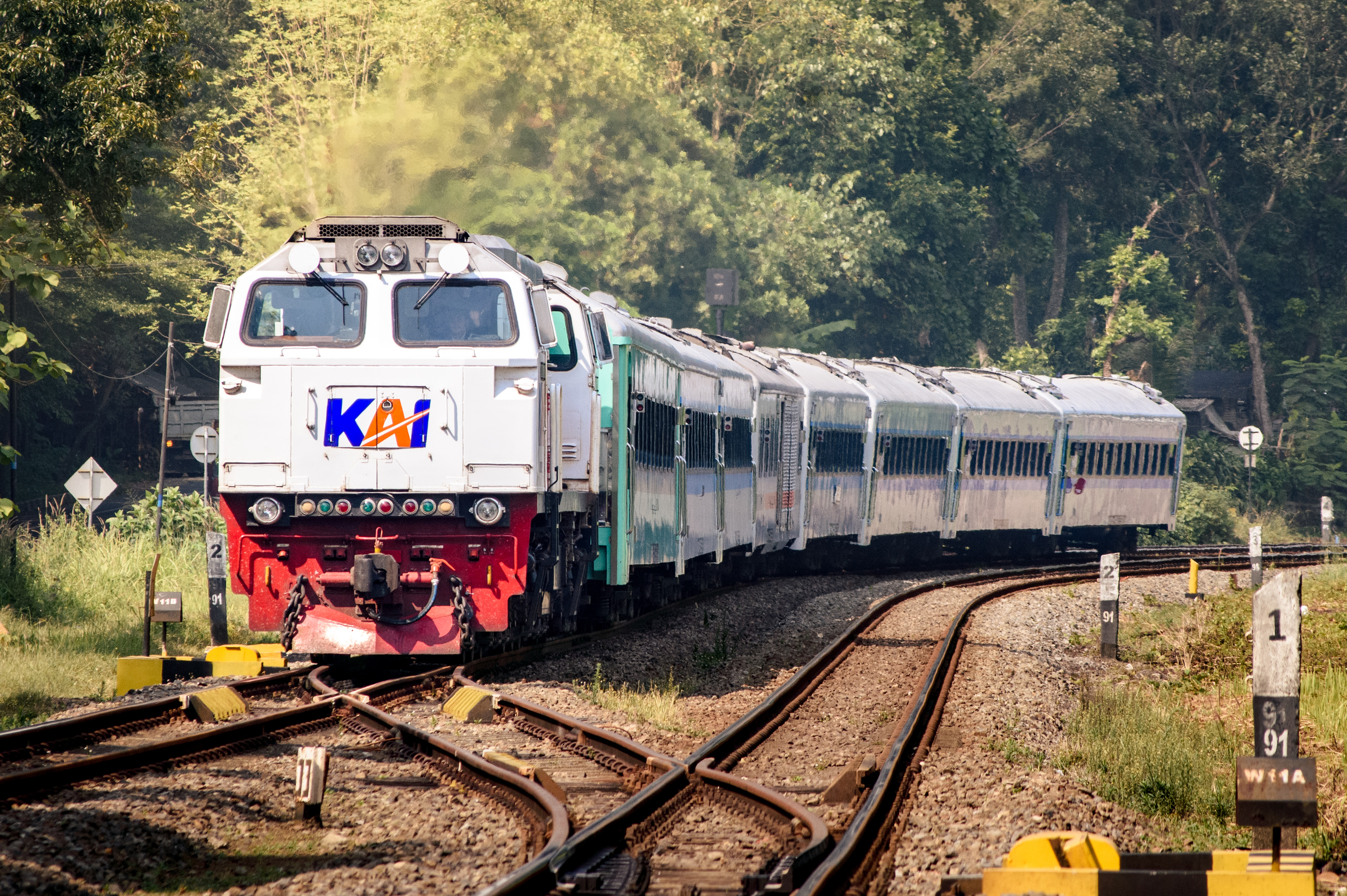
- Cikuray with its new trainset

Overview
- Service type: Inter-city rail
- Status: Operational
- First service: 25 March 2022
- Current operator: Kereta Api Indonesia

Route
- Termini: Jakarta Pasar Senen; Garut
- Distance travelled: 245 km (152 mil)
- Average journey time: 5 hours 40 minutes
- Service frequency: 1x daily everyday (morning schedule from Garut to Pasar Senen & evening schedule from Pasar Senen to Garut)
- Train number: 299-300

On-board services
- Classes: People's economy; Farmer and Trader economy
- Catering facilities: On-board cafe and trolley service

Technical
- Rolling stock: CC206
- Track gauge: 1067 mm
- Operating speed: 50 - 100 km/h (31 - 62 mph)
Route map
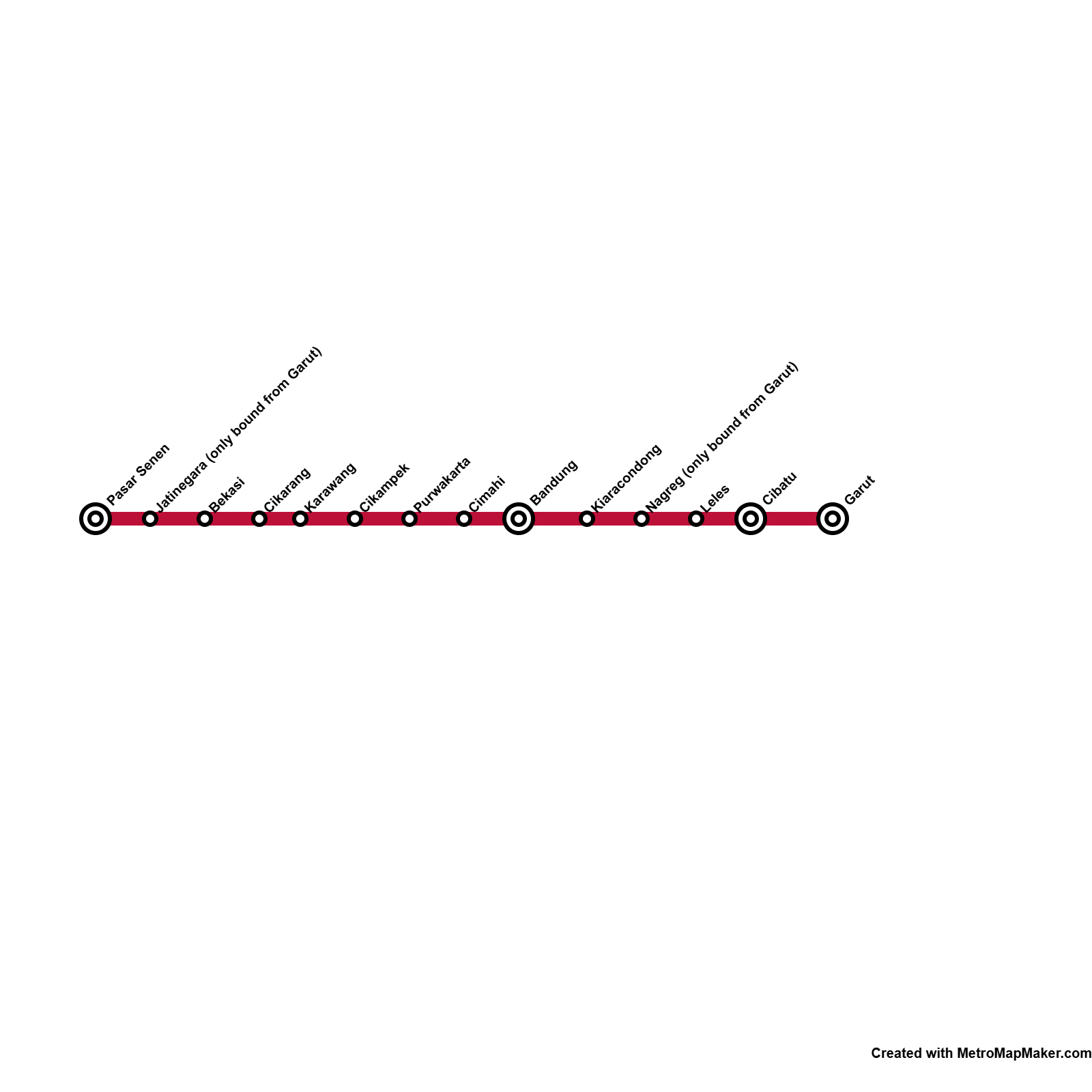

Cikuray train is an intercity rail passenger train operated by Kereta Api Indonesia (KAI) serving the route between Garut in West Java and Pasar Senen in Jakarta. The train operates one daily round trip, with a morning departure from Garut and an evening departure from Jakarta. It is an economy class service designed to provide affordable long distance rail transport.

The route covers a distance of approximately 245 kilometres, with an average travel time of around 5 hours 30 minutes, following timetable adjustments under the 2025 train travel chart. The train has been in operation since 25 March 2022, following the reactivation of the Garut railway line after decades of inactivity.

== History ==
The Cikuray train was officially inaugurated on 25 March 2022, marking the return of regular passenger rail services to Garut after the Garut–Cibatu line had been inactive for almost four decades.

The name Cikuray is derived from Mount Cikuray, a stratovolcano located in Garut Regency. The name reflects KAI's practice of using prominent geographical features for train branding and was proposed during preparations for the service launch by the local government of Garut.

On 1 February 2025, the travel schedule and running time of the Cikuray train were revised following the implementation of the 2025 train travel chart. Under this revision, the train continued to operate once daily in each direction, but with improved efficiency and a shorter journey time of around 5 hours 30 minutes. The revised schedule retained a morning departure from Garut and an evening departure from Pasar Senen.

== Stations ==
Under the train travel chart in force since February 2025, the Cikuray train serves the following stations along its Garut–Pasar Senen route:

- Garut (start and end)
- Cibatu
- Leles
- Nagreg
- Kiaracondong
- Bandung
- Cimahi
- Padalarang
- Purwakarta
- Cikampek
- Karawang
- Cikarang
- Bekasi
- Jatinegara
- Pasar Senen (start and end)

== Gallery ==
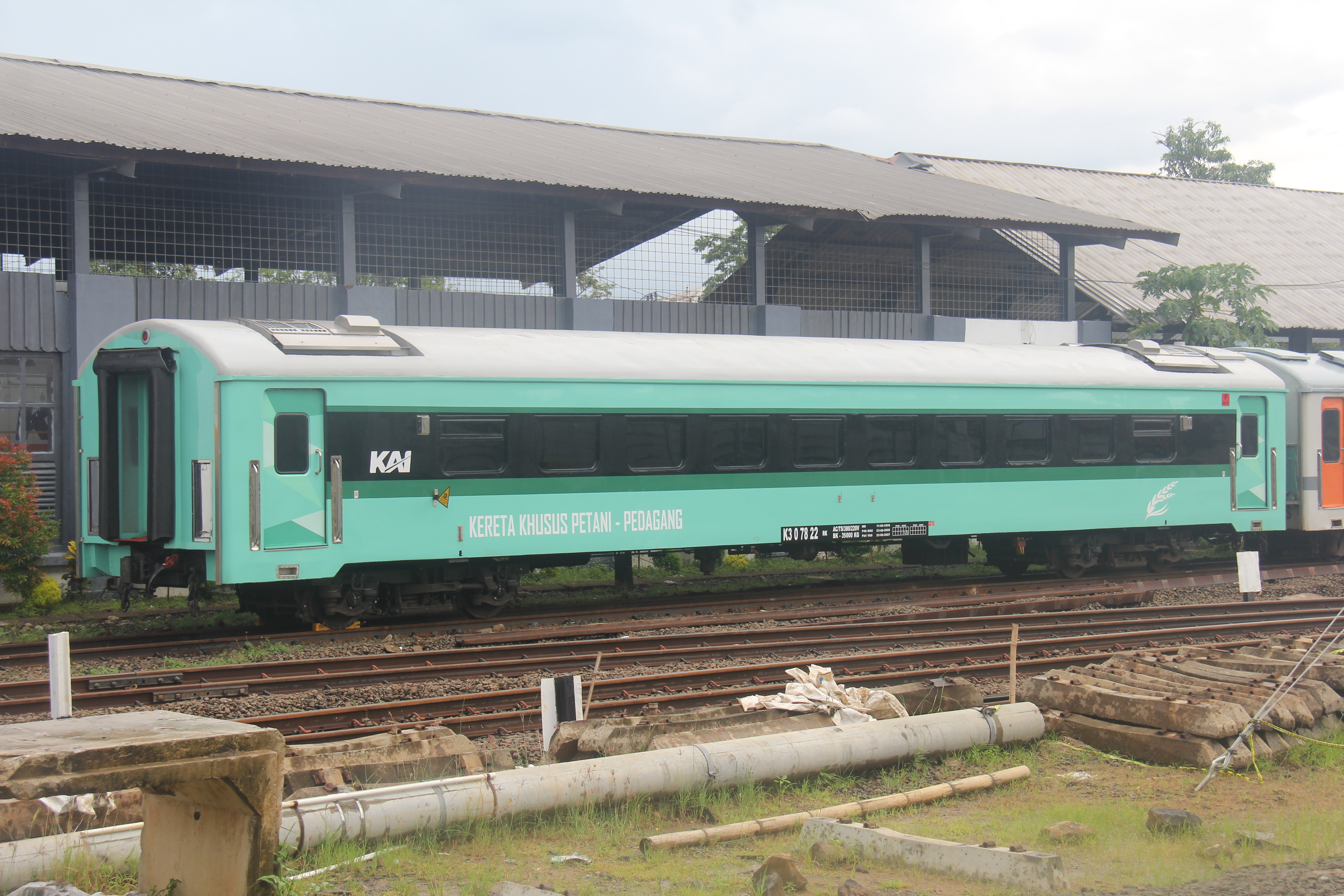
Farmer and Trader economy special used by the Cikuray train on 10 June 2026

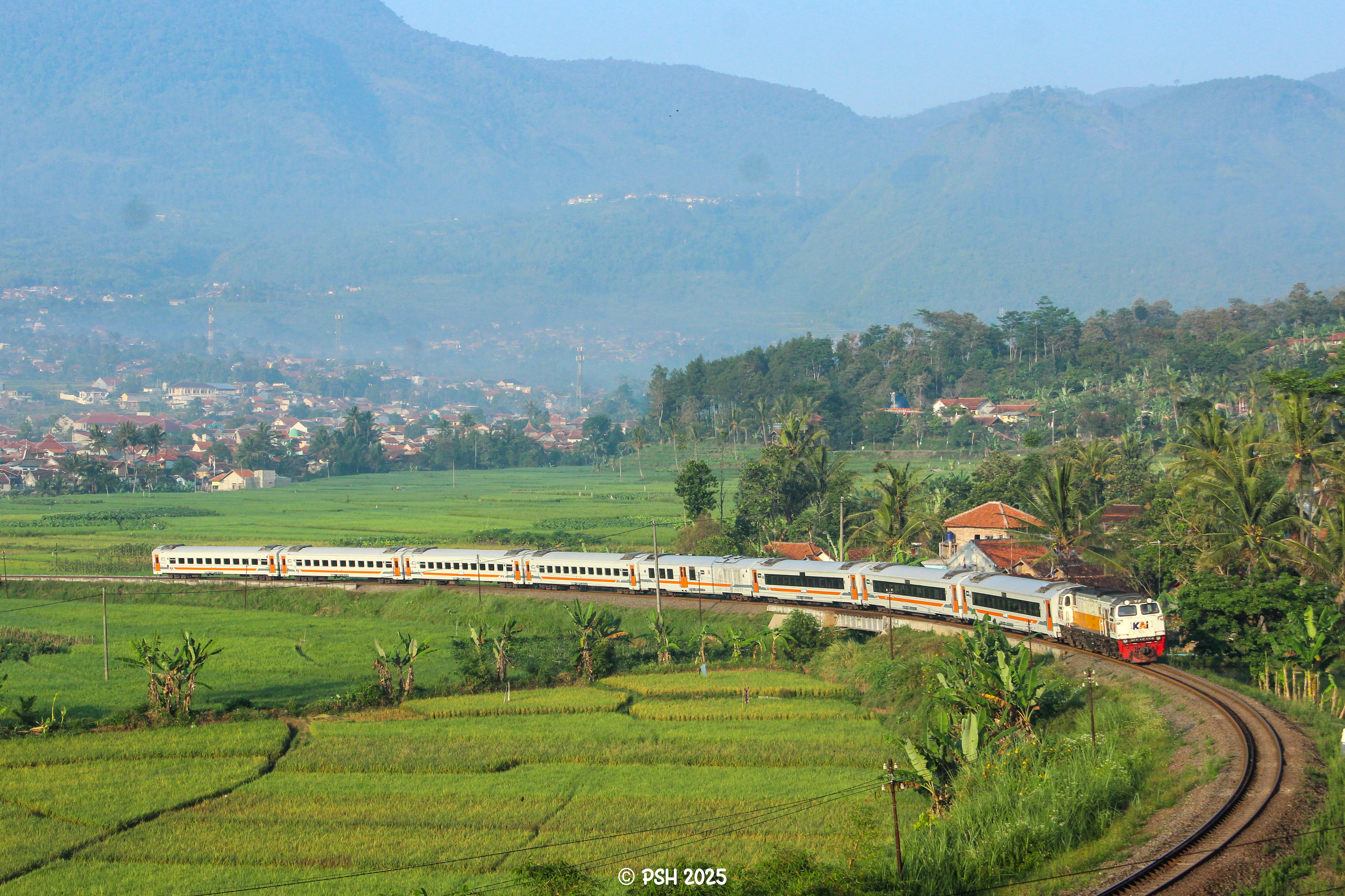
Cikuray in Kadungora Curve, 2025

== See also ==
- Papandayan
- Pangrango
- Pangandaran
