= Parahyangan (train) =

Train service between Jakarta and Bandung in Indonesia

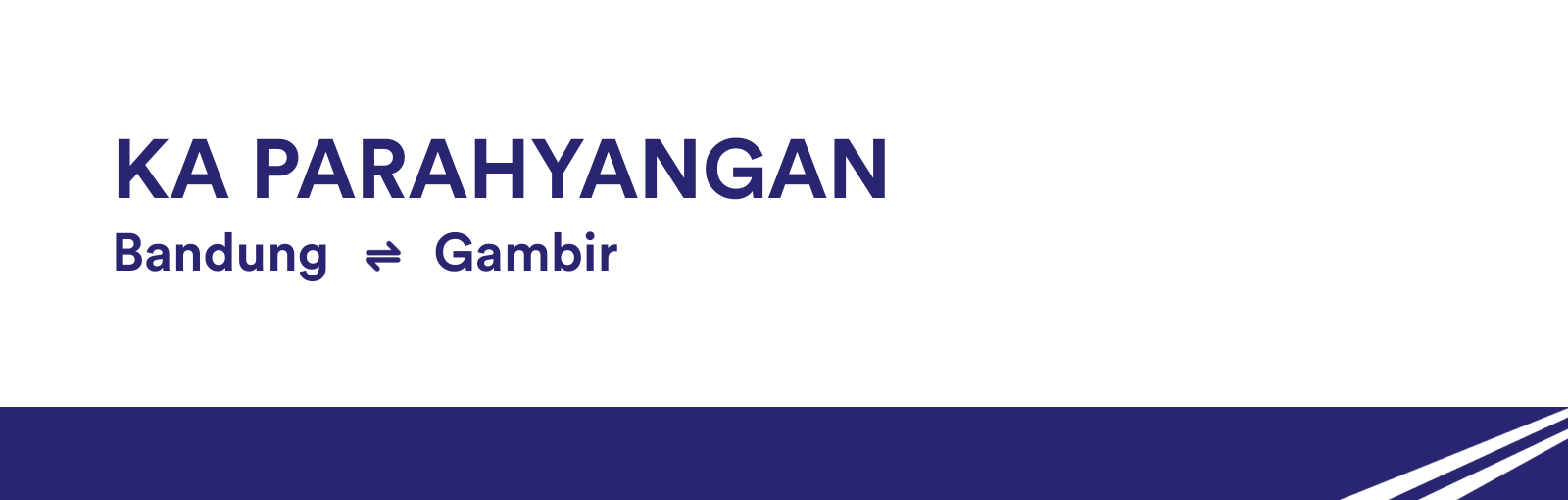

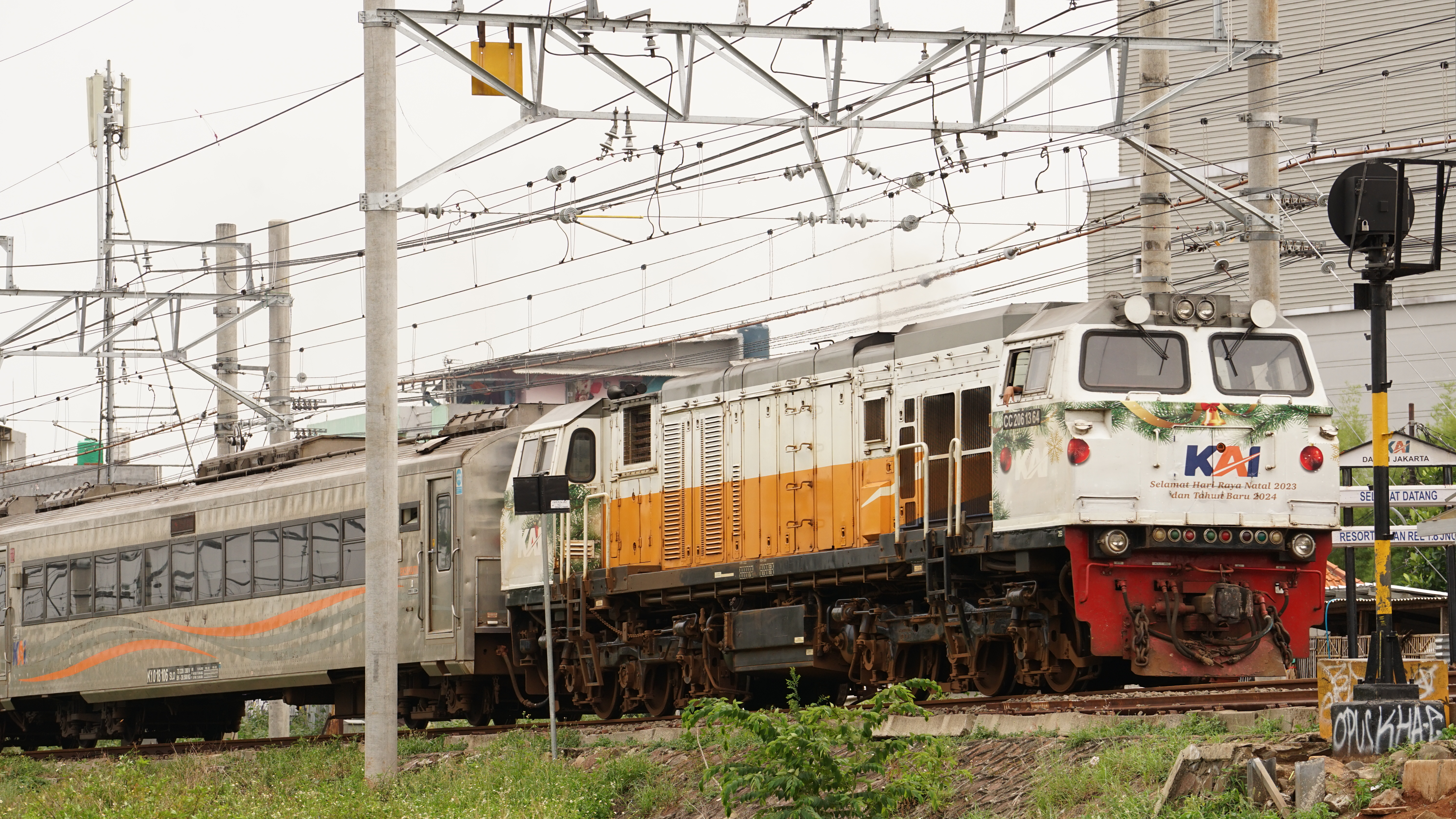
- Argo Parahyangan going up to the elevated rail section after Jatinegara Station, 2024

Overview
- Service type: Inter-city rail
- Status: Operational
- Locale: Operational Area II Bandung; Operational Area I Jakarta
- Predecessor: Parahyangan (1971–2010); Argo Gede (originally JB250 Argogede) (1995–2010); Argo Parahyangan (2010–2025)
- First service: 27 April 2010 (as the Argo Parahyangan); 1 February 2025 (returned to Parahyangan)
- Last service: 31 January 2025 (Argo Parahyangan)
- Current operators: Kereta Api Indonesia; Operational Area II Bandung; Operational Area I Jakarta

Route
- Termini: Bandung; Gambir
- Stops: look below
- Distance travelled: 166 kilometres (103 mi)
- Average journey time: 2 hours 58 minutes
- Service frequency: 20
- Train numbers: 131-140 (regular train); 141-142 (facultative train)

On-board services
- Classes: Panoramic, Executive and Economy Premium (Regular train); Executive and Priority (using Pandalungan idle trainset); Executive and Economy Premium (using Malabar idle trainset); Executive and Luxury (using Gajayana idle trainset); Executive (using Argo Wilis idle trainset); Executive and Panoramic (using Turangga idle trainset)

Technical
- Rolling stock: CC206 class
- Track gauge: 1,067 mm (42.0 in)
- Operating speed: 60–120 km/h (37–75 mph)

Parahyangan, formerly known as Argo Parahyangan or Gopar for short, is an inter-city train service consisting of executive and economy premium class operated by Kereta Api Indonesia (KAI / Indonesian Railways Company) between Gambir railway station, Jakarta and Bandung in Java, Indonesia. The train covers 166 kilometres (103 mi) in 2 hours 58 minutes (average time). From Jakarta to Bandung the train stops at Bekasi, Purwakarta, and Cimahi, whereas from Bandung to Jakarta it stops only at Jatinegara. KAI operates 34 trips daily in the route.

== Etymology ==
The train service is named after Parahyangan or Priangan or Preanger, a cultural and mountainous region in West Java. The term "Parahyangan" itself in Sundanese means "the place where the gods (hyang) reside".

== History ==
=== Parahyangan (1971–2010) ===
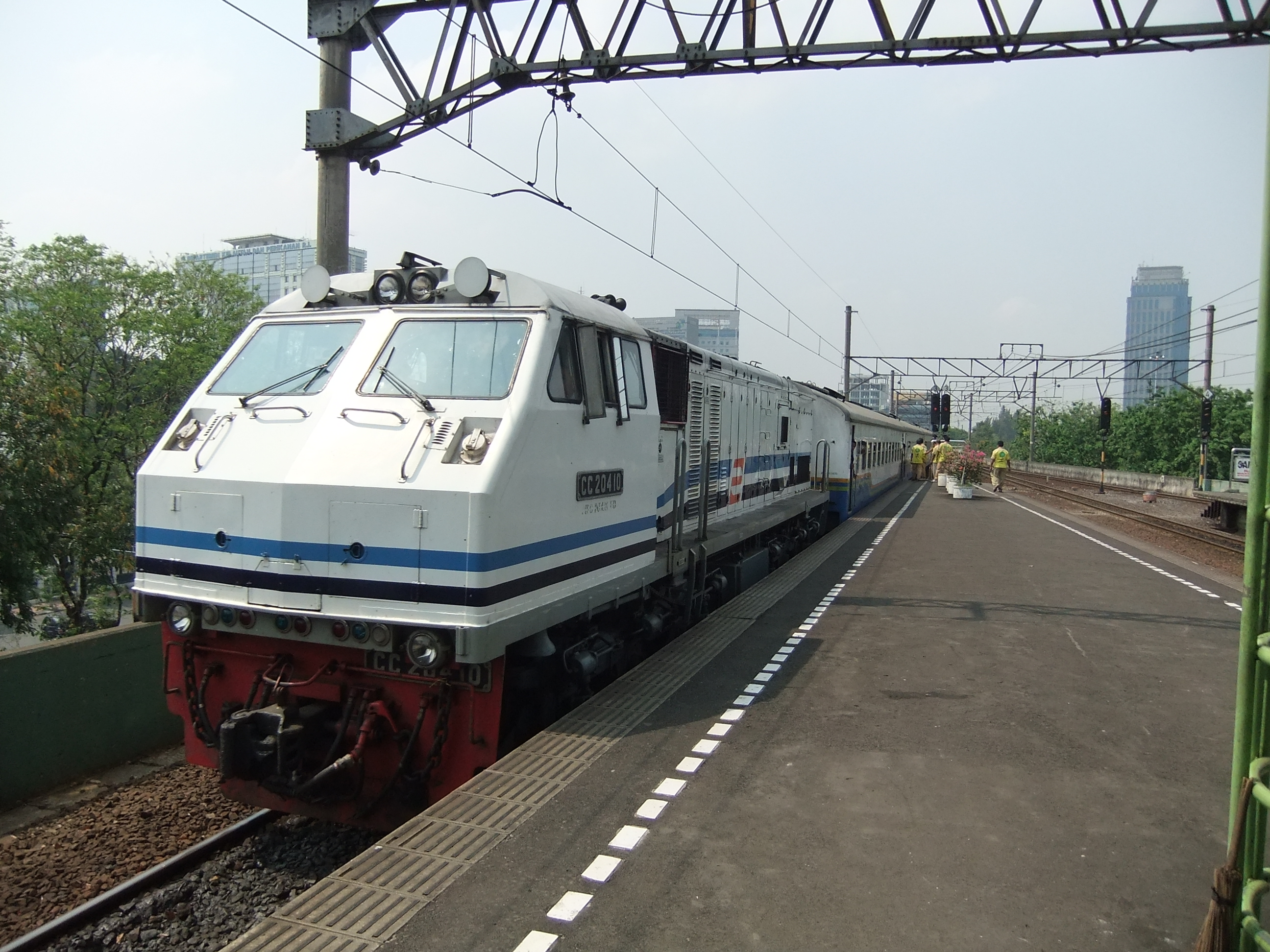
Parahyangan arriving at Gambir Station, 2009

The then-State Railways Company (Perusahaan Negara Kereta Api or PNKA) launched the Parahyangan train service on 31 July 1971 with business and executive class services, connecting Bandung to Jakarta in 2 hours and 30 minutes.

At the beginning of its operation, this train was often hauled by BB301 class locomotives. The BB304 class locomotive was also used once before being replaced by the CC201 class locomotive.

In 2005, the Parahyangan operated with two executive class cars and three business class cars in a trainset as the result of a decrease in passenger occupancy levels due to the opening of the Cikampek–Purwakarta–Padalarang (Cipularang) toll road—of which the journey from Jakarta to Bandung at that time was faster. To increase passenger occupancy, KAI had imposed a fare discount starting 7 March 2008 before this train service was discontinued on 26 April 2010.

=== Argo Gede (1995–2010) ===
The Argo Gede train was the first Argo train service to operate from 31 July 1995. The train service was named after Mount Gede, one of the mountains in West Java. This train service was launched at Gambir Station by the Railway Company simultaneously with the inauguration of the JS-950 Argo Bromo train and the launch of the CC203 class locomotive. During its operation, this train travels from Jakarta to Bandung for 2.5 hours and operates using a series of trains made by INKA released in 1995. As of October 1999, this train service served two trips a day and the fare was set at Rp40,000.00.

The company then launched the Argo Gede II train service on 20 May 2001—along with the launch of the Argo Muria II and Gumarang train services—to increase the number of trips across Jakarta–Bandung route.

Several Jakarta-Bandung route services experienced a decrease in occupancy rates due to the operation of the Cipularang toll road in 2005. Even so, the occupancy rate of the Argo Gede train was higher when compared to the Parahyangan.

=== Argo Parahyangan (2010–2025) ===
Argo Parahyangan began its operation on 27 April 2010–by merging two train services of the same route, namely Parahyangan and Argo Gede train services. The Argo Parahyangan was the result of the fusion of both train services, as well as the result of Kereta Api Indonesia's response to passengers' disappointment after the termination of Parahyangan train service.

==== Business and Executive class (2010–2016) ====
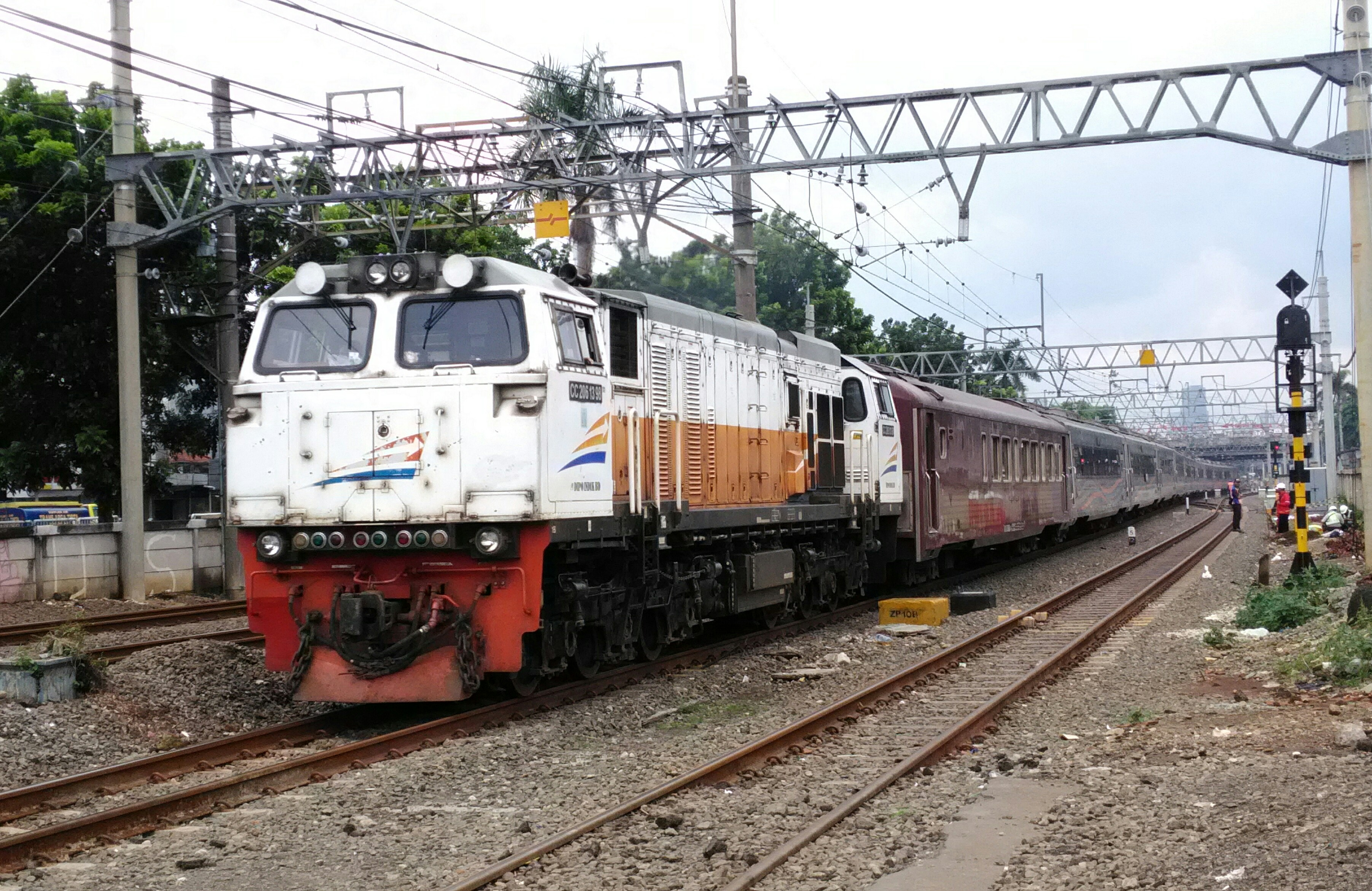
Argo Parahyangan at Pisangan Timur, Pulo Gadung, East Jakarta, 2020

The Argo Parahyangan had operated with trainsets consisting of three to four executive class cars (former Argo Gede cars) and two to three business class cars (former Parahyangan cars). Since 2010, Argo Parahyangan train also became the first Argo class train to have a class other than the executive class.

==== Economy and Executive class (2016–2017) ====
Since 25 October 2016, the Argo Parahyangan business class service has been changed to economy plus class. The economy plus class cars were made by INKA and released in 2016. The cars was once used for the Mutiara Selatan train service or other services, and the cars were criticized by the public for reasons of convenience, namely the narrow distance between seats. In addition, the number of trips was added due to an increase in occupancy rates.

==== 2017–2025 ====
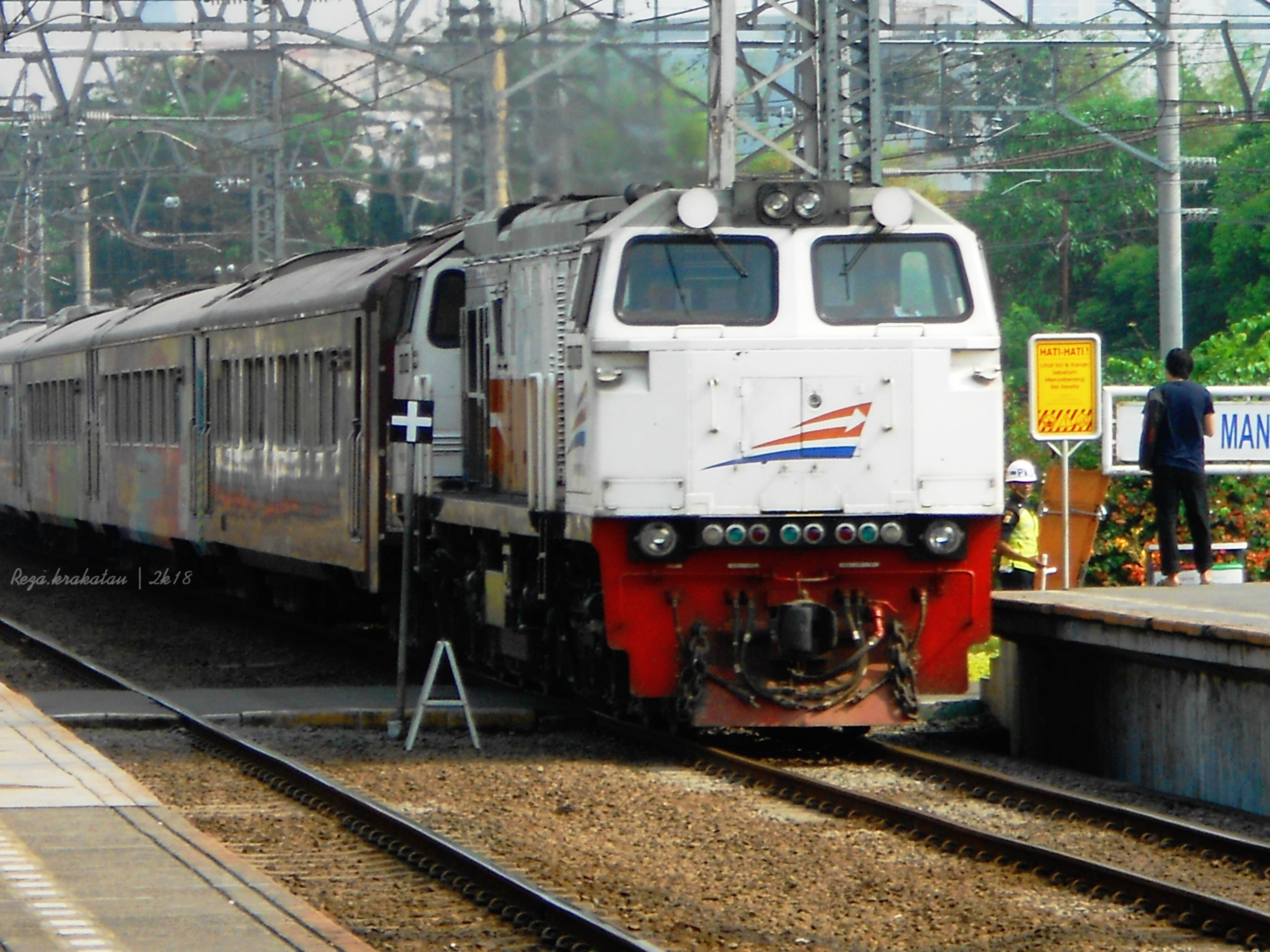
Argo Parahyangan passing through Manggarai Station, 2018

Between 2017 and 2019, this service began operating using trainsets made by INKA, consisting of the premium economy class cars made in 2017 and executive class made of stainless steel made in 2018. In addition, this train started serving Priority class services on 9 March 2018. The regular Argo Parahyangan trainset was replaced with a new set of INKA-manufactured passenger coaches made of stainless steel starting in 2019.

KAI launched a train service with a shorter travel time (2 hours 50 minutes) named Argo Parahyangan Excellence, starting on 1 October 2019.

According to the 2021 train travel chart (Grafik Perjalanan Kereta Api or Gapeka), this train has four regular round trips and six optional train trips.

As of 3 February 2023, the Argo Parahyangan received additional Panoramic Train coaches which operates throughout February 2023 on Friday for train number 44A and Sunday for train number 51A.

However, on 1 June 2023 followed by the enactment of the new train travel chart for 2023, Kiaracondong Station will not be served by the Argo Parahyangan.

=== Parahyangan (2025–present) ===
On 1 February 2025, following the enactment of new train travel chart for 2025, PT Kereta Api Indonesia reverted the train's name from Argo Parahyangan back to its previous name of Parahyangan, 14 years after its discontinuance on 26 April 2010.

== Facilities ==
At present 17 trains of several types of Parahyangan series operate. The latest Parahyangan Excellence train is the fastest among different types, which takes journey at 2 hours and 50 minutes.

For the Turangga series, the train uses CC206 locomotive consisting of one generator car, six executive train carriages, and one dining car. Harina series uses CC206 locomotive consisting of one economy train carriage, two business train carriages, four executive train carriages, one generator train, and one dining car.

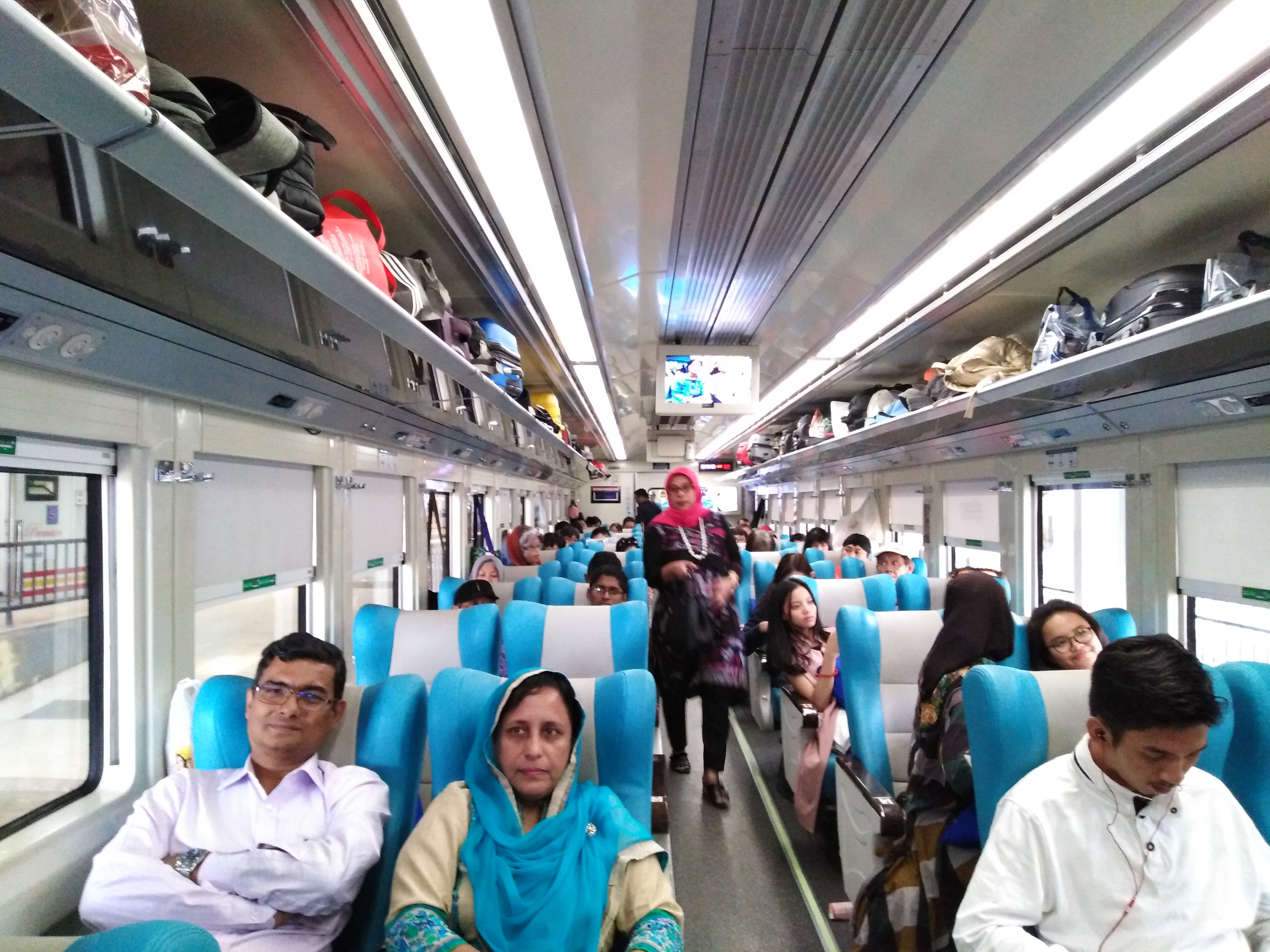
Interior of an Argo Parahyangan executive class, 2018

Parahyangan Regular train series usually consists of four economy plus train carriages, four executive carriages, one dining, one panoramic observation, and one power generator car. As for the additional trains, the series consists of one generator car, one dining car, four executive carriages, and three economy carriages.

The new configured train, which was inaugurated in March 2018, has capacity of 400 seats passengers per train, consisting of eight executive class cars, one dining train with praying facility, and one generator car. Each coach has Two 32-inch TV, installed at the front and rear end, and two 19-inch screens hang on the ceiling of the train. The train is equipped with modern technology such CCTV and smoke detector. Seats have sleep and reading lights, audio jack for earphone or headset, fold-able mini tables on the armrests, and separate cabin baggage.

Additionally, some Parahyangan train consists have one added Priority class coach with seating capacity of 28 passengers. This train car has extra facilities such as audio video on demand (AVOD) in every seat, a minibar, 52-inch flat screen TV, special attendants, luxurious toilet, as well as premium seats.

== Incidents ==
- On 30 May 2014, the Argo Parahyangan train derailed in Depok, Darangdan, Purwakarta towards Cikadongdong Station which resulted in two cars and a locomotive derailing. Apart from that, the journey of the Serayu train was diverted and hundreds of passengers on the Argo Parahyangan train were stranded.
- On 26 August 2019 at 13:00, Argo Parahyangan train number 32 collided with an employee transport bus at the Warungbambu level crossing, East Karawang, Karawang because the bus broke down while crossing the railroad crossing. This incident resulted in the glass of the locomotive's lamps breaking, the generator car and several passenger cars being damaged. There were no casualties in the incident because the driver and passengers got out to avoid the accident. However, train travel was hampered.
- On 21 December 2019 at 22:15, the Argo Parahyangan train crashed into a car on a level crossing in Cibitung, Wanasari, Cibitung, Bekasi Regency which resulted in the car being badly damaged and seven passengers dying at the accident site. In addition, the left fog light on the locomotive broke then made an extraordinary stop at Tambun Station to inspect the locomotive.

== Gallery ==
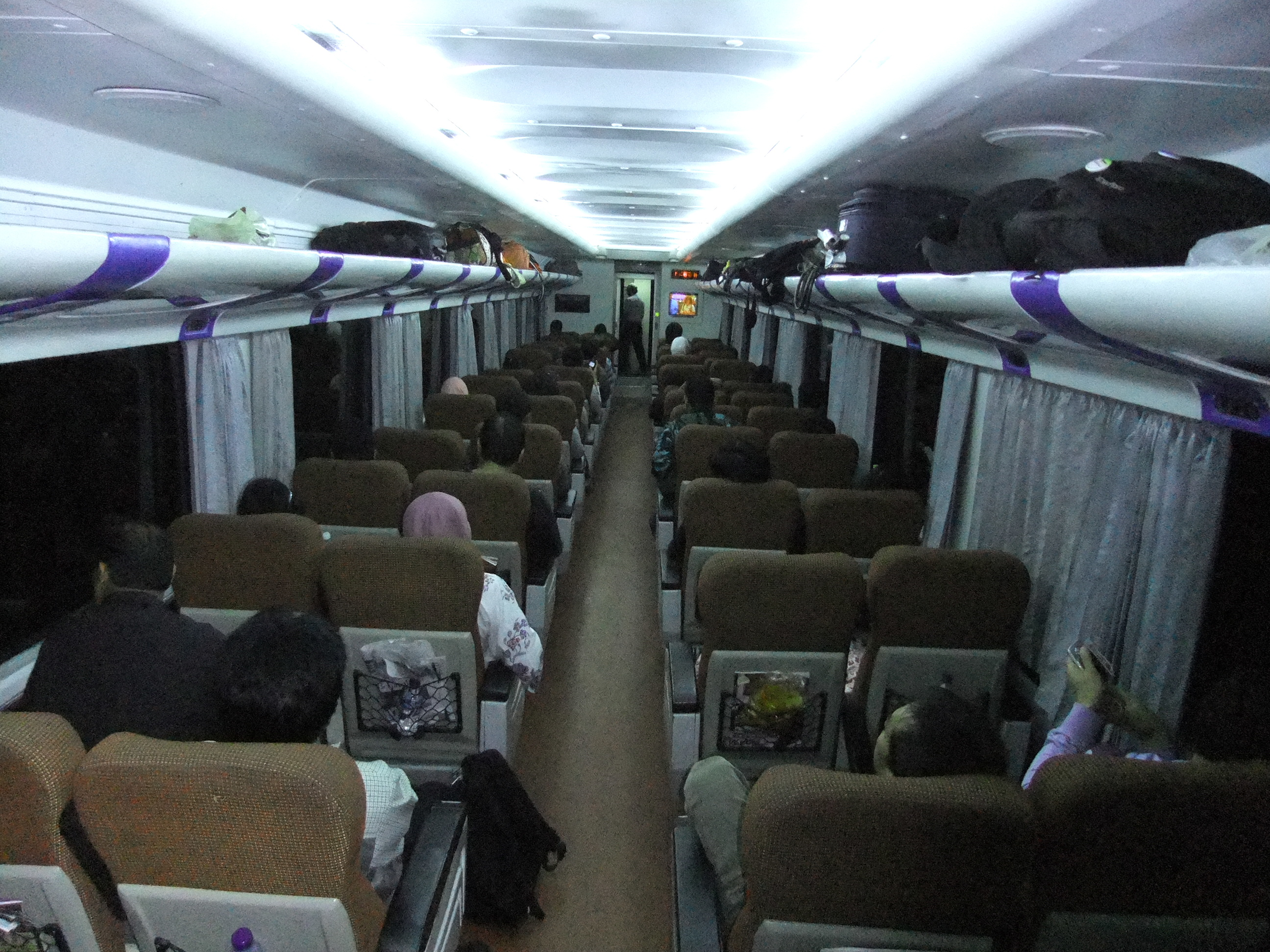
Inside the Argo Parahyangan executive car prior to train series changing, 2010

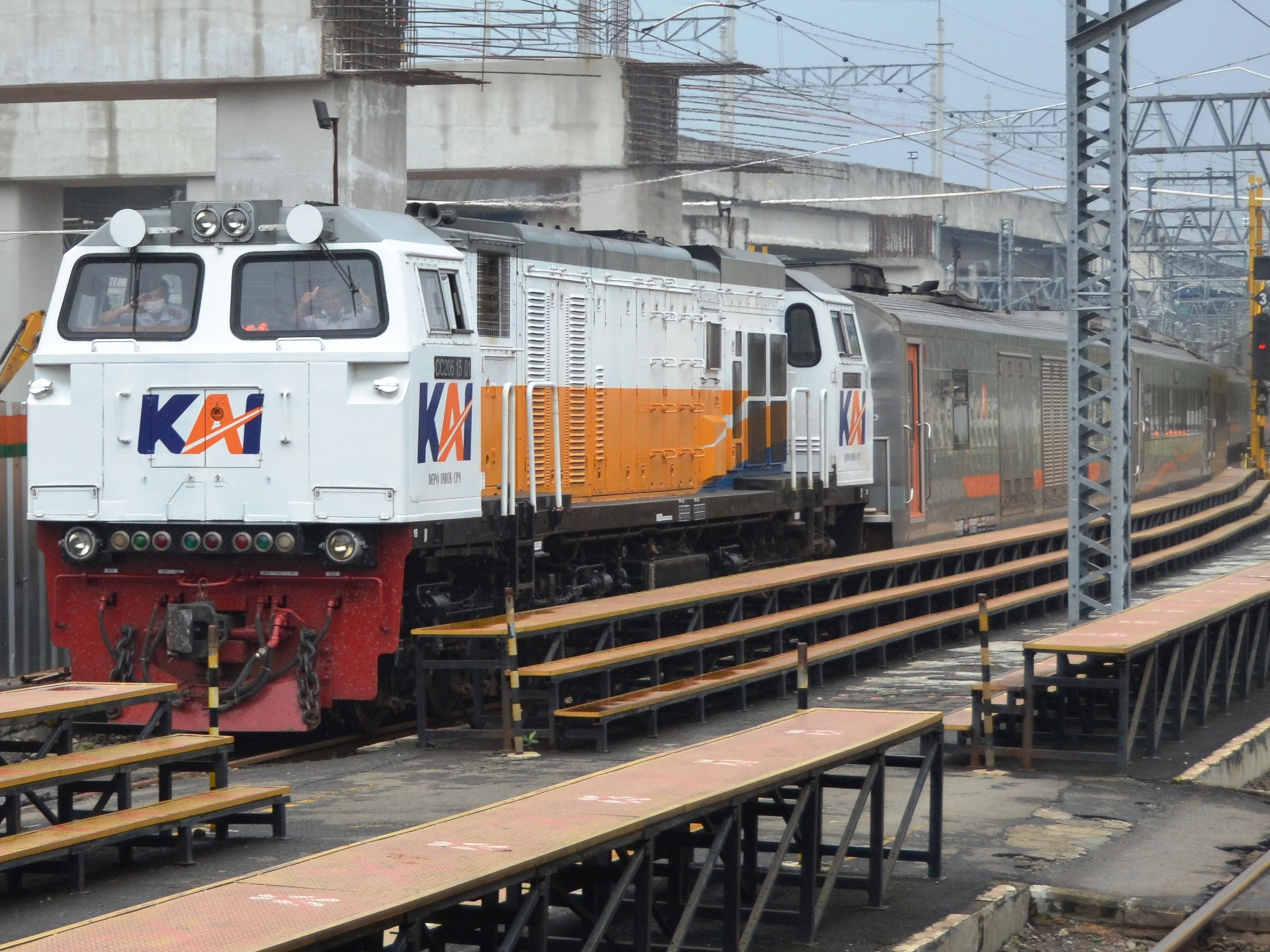
The Parahyangan train pulled by the CC 206 15 01 passing through Manggarai Station, 2022

== See also ==
- Kereta Api Indonesia
- Rail transport in Indonesia
- List of named passenger trains of Indonesia
- Pangandaran
- Jakarta–Bandung line
