= Turangga =

Passenger train service between Bandung and Surabaya, Indonesia since 1995

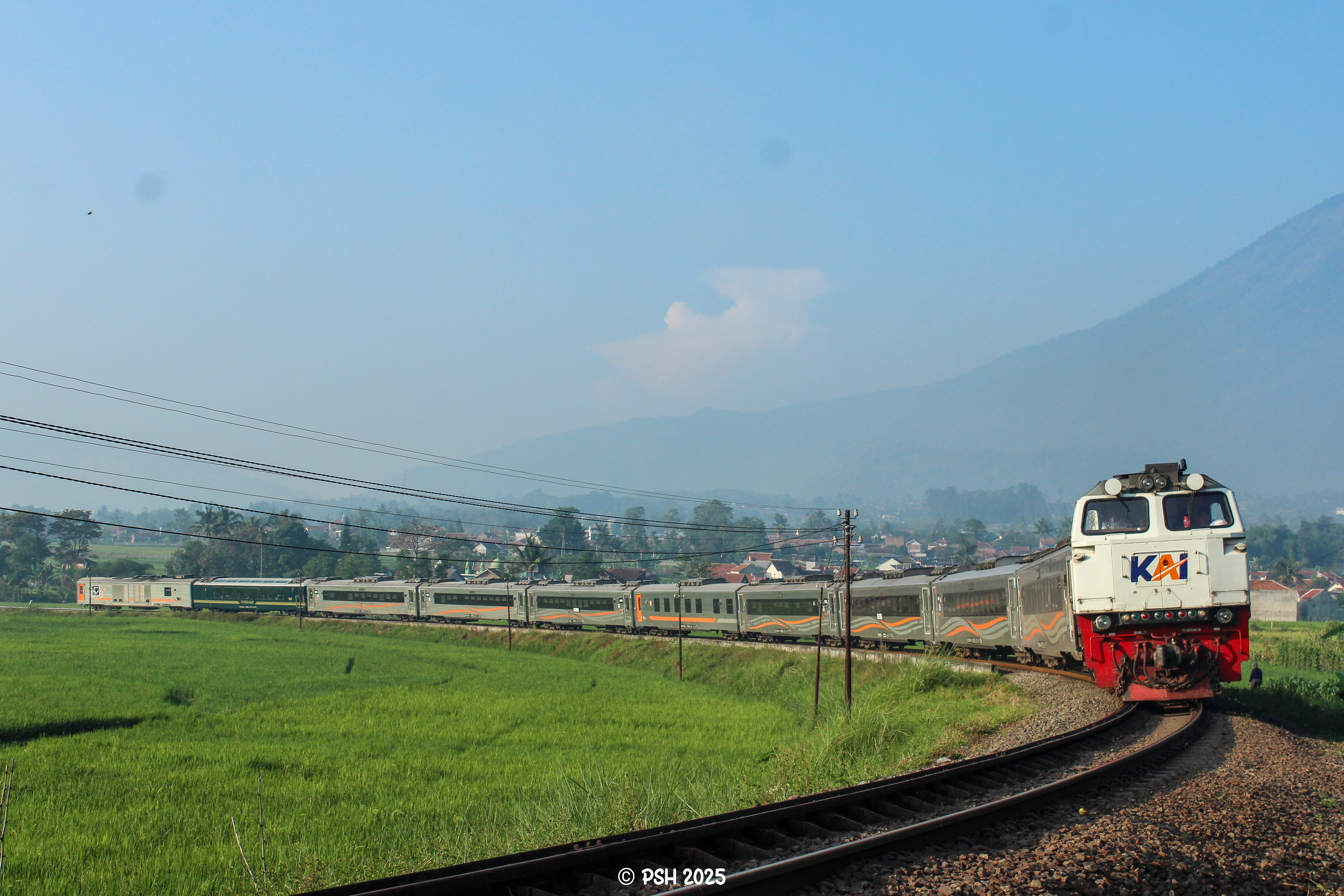
- Turangga train (11) at Kadungora curve, August 2025

Overview
- Service type: Inter-city rail
- Status: Operational
- Locale: Operational Area II Bandung
- First service: 1 September 1995
- Current operator: Kereta Api Indonesia

Route
- Termini: Bandung; Surabaya Gubeng
- Distance travelled: 696 km (432 miles)
- Average journey time: 10 hours 5 minutes
- Service frequency: Daily each way
- Train number: 11-12

On-board services
- Classes: Executive & Panoramic
- Seating arrangements: 50 seats arranged 2–2 (executive) seats can recline and rotate; 38 seats arranged 2-2 (panoramic) seats can recline and rotate
- Catering facilities: On-board cafe and trolley service
- Observation facilities: The duplex panoramic glass, with blinds, heat insulating laminated layer
- Entertainment facilities: free Wi-Fi, Air conditioning Passenger information system, USB, etc

Technical
- Rolling stock: CC206
- Track gauge: 1.067 mm
- Operating speed: 70–120 kilometres per hour (43–75 mph)
Route map

Turangga is an executive and panoramic passenger train service operated by Kereta Api Indonesia serving the Bandung (BD)–Surabaya Gubeng (SGU) via the southern route of Java. This train departs from its starting station in the evening and arrives at its ending station the following morning schedule, in contrast to the Argo Wilis. This train is a inter-city rail, the train travel offer 1x travel around 696 km (432 miles) in 10 hours 5 minutes at night schedule for replacing the Argo Wilis which only at morning schedule.

This train only service at evening or night schedule, also the Turangga train was launched at 1 September 1995. The Turangga train as the first train name from mythology animal in southern of Java before the Lodaya that heading to Solo Balapan (SLO) which launched on 12 May 2000.

== Mythology ==
The name of Turangga is taken from the name of an animal, which, according to local belief, is another name for the horse ridden by Javanese nobility and king. This horse symbolizes a fast and resilient vehicle. This naming clearly aims to ensure the Turangga train provides the best service for the satisfaction and pride of its passengers at night. Physically, the Turangga horse isn't much different another horses, instead that the Turangga horse can run faster. Beside this his name as identity of the train name, the Turangga also found some that Vehicle named from Turangga in Indonesian National Armed Forces include TAD Turangga armored infantry vehicle of Indonesia.

== History ==
=== Begin of the Turangga train (1995 - 2018) ===
The Turangga train first operated on 1 September, 1995, serving the Bandung-Surabaya route with business plus and executive class services. Since 11 October 1999, it has only served executive class and operated using new train sets from INKA manufactured in 1999, while its business class sets were transferred to Malang for the operation of the Gajayana train.

Since 19 January 2009, this train has been operating using refurbished train sets made in 1960's most of the colors visible in the train are green.

=== Turangga train (2018 - Present) ===
Since mid-2018, stainless steel train sets manufactured by the PT INKA have been used to operate the Turangga train. With the release of the latest train schedule by the Directorate General of Railways and Railways of Indonesia on 1 December 2019, the Turangga train route was extended to Gambir railway station rolling with the Argo Wilis.

However, on 1 September 2020, the Turangga train returned to the original route (Bandung - Surabaya) due to the Covid-19 pandemic.

Beginning on 28 September 2022, to coincide with the 77th birthday of Kereta Api Indonesia, the Turangga train experienced an increase in speed from 105 km/h (65 mph) to 120 km/h (75 mph)

On 1 June 2023, following the enactment of new train travel chart 2023, The Turangga train will exchange train sets with the Argo Wilis, which is planned that 2 Turangga train train sets will be transferred 1 train set to the Jakarta Kota train depot (JAKK) for the purpose of operating the Manahan train while the other 1 train set has been transferred to the Bandung train depot (BD), even then the Turangga train was also taken over operationally to Operational Area II Bandung from Operational Area VIII Surabaya.

On 3 June 2023, two days after the implementation of the enactment of new train travel chart 2023 followed by the launch of services for the western line trains, namely Argo Parahyangan, the Panoramic train set on the Argo Wilis and Turangga trains on the southern route of Java Island is now operating regularly with train numbers 5 and 6 for the Argo Wilis train and numbers 65 and 66 for the Turangga train.

== Routine Service ==
Since begin of the enactment of new train travel chart 2025, the Argo Wilis & Turangga train using a train swap system with a "three trains & four trips" operating pattern where they exchange trains with each other. For example, Turangga 12 departs from Bandung at 17:40 WIB and arrives at Surabaya Gubeng Station at 03:40 WIB. Upon arrival in Surabaya, the former Turangga 12 train will 'change its name' to Argo Wilis 9 departing from Surabaya Gubeng at 08:30 WIB. Likewise, the arrival of Argo Wilis 10, at 17:15 WIB in Surabaya Gubeng will also change its name to Turangga 11 for the 20:00 WIB departure from Surabaya Gubeng.

However, unlike the arrival or departure of the Turangga and Argo Wilis trains at Bandung Station, which not allow for "exchange" like at Surabaya Gubeng Station. To overcome this, a "3rd reserve" trainset is needed that will be reused. When the Turangga train from Surabaya Gubeng arrives at Bandung Station at 06.10, the former Turangga train will "sleep" at the Bandung Train Depot and one "3rd reserve" trainset (former from the Sidotopo Main Depot) will be used by the Argo Wilis to go to Surabaya and exchange with the Turangga at Surabaya Gubeng.

== List of the Station ==
On 1 Februari 2025, following of the enactment of new train travel chart 2025, the Turangga train will service at night only for replacing the Argo Wilis.

- Bandung (Start/End)
- Cipeundeuy
- Tasikmalaya
- Ciamis railway station
- Banjar
- Kroya
- Kebumen
- Kutoarjo
- Yogyakarta
- Solo Balapan
- Madiun
- Nganjuk
- Kertosono
- Jombang
- Mojokerto railway station
- Surabaya Gubeng (Start/End)

== Accident & Incidents ==
- On 8 May 2006 at 05.02 local time, the Turangga train was collision with the Freight train carrying rails that no one person of passenger or crew of the Turangga were killed in accident in Karangsari, Garut Regency, West Java.
- On 30 March 2023, the Turangga train, pulled by locomotive CC 206 13 99, collided with a truck carrying animal feed at railroad crossing number 76 between Sembung Station and Jombang Station in Jatipelem, Diwek, Jombang Regency, East Java. The accident was caused by a truck that broke down at the crossing. The locomotive pulling the Turangga train was damaged, but there were no fatalities in this incident. This incident caused delays for trains crossing the Kertosono–Surabaya railway line.
- On 5 Januari 2024 at 06:03 local time, the Turangga train (65A) was Collision with 350 Greater Bandung Commuter Line from Haurpugur railway station in western Cicalengka, Bandung Regency, West Java. The accident occurred at the entrance signal of Cicalengka Station, specifically at kilometer 181+700. At the time of the accident, the Turangga train was carrying 287 passengers, and the Greater Bandung Commuter Line train was carrying 191 passengers. The incident causing 4 people are dead, including the engineer, the assistant engineer, a security guard for the Greater Bandung Commuter Line, and a Turangga train attendant. 37 passengers suffered minor injuries. Due Incident, Southern jawa railway from Bandung until Kroya station not allowed to the Bandung or left from Bandung. so that all trains passing through the railway line were diverted via Cikampek–Cirebon Prujakan railway and Cirebon Prujakan–Kroya railway until the evacuation and normalization southern java line process was completed.
- On 30 March 2025, the Turangga train (12) collision with a car in Krendaten Village, Purworejo Regency, Central Java the passenger car were no fatalities.

== Gallery ==
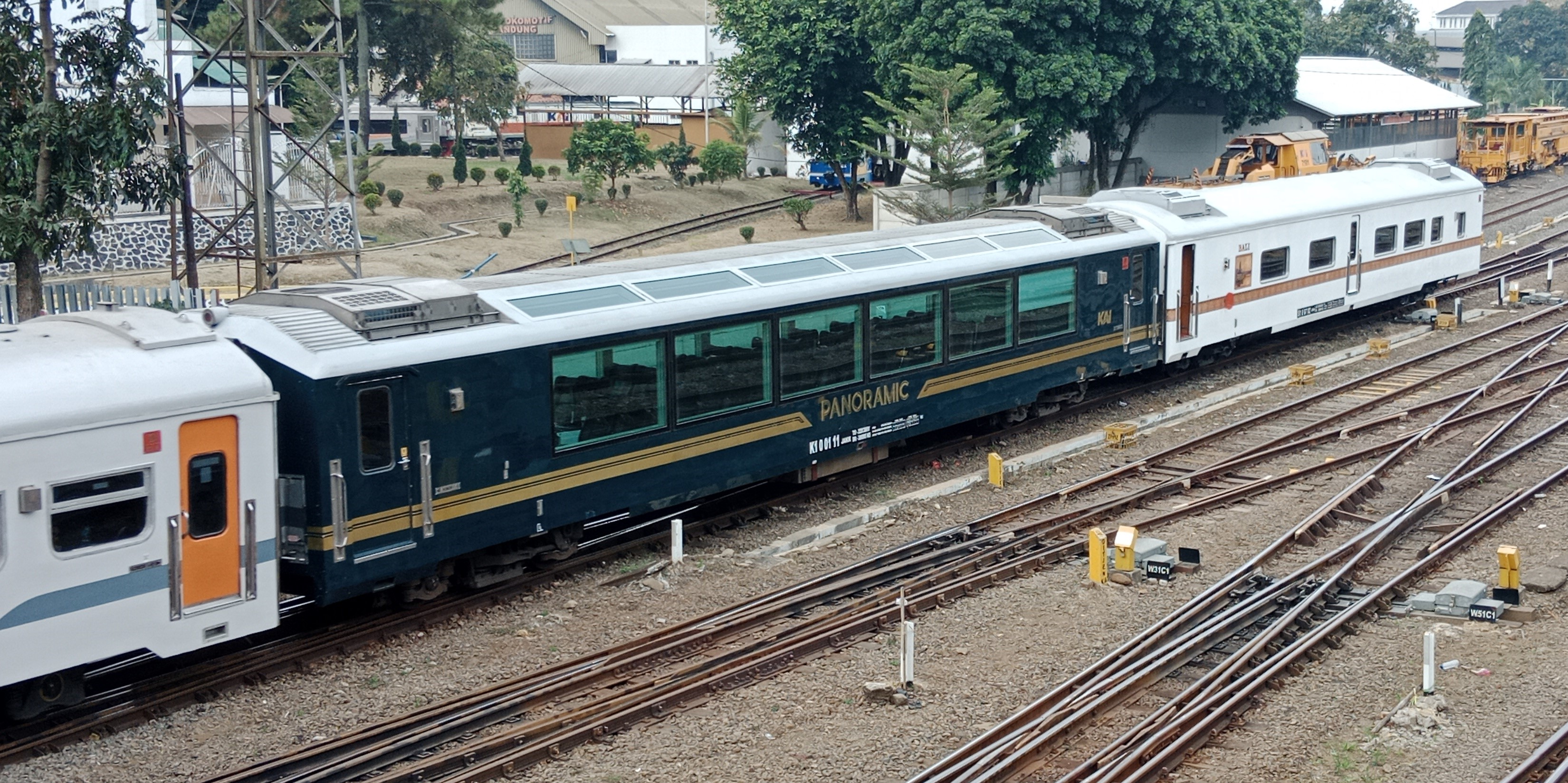
Panoramic coach used by the Turangga and Argo Wilis

== See also ==
- Argo Wilis
- Lodaya
- Turangga (horse)
- Sembrani
- Malabar
- Taksaka
- Sancaka
- Gumarang
