= Garut railway station =

Railway station in Indonesia

Garut Station Stasiun Garut
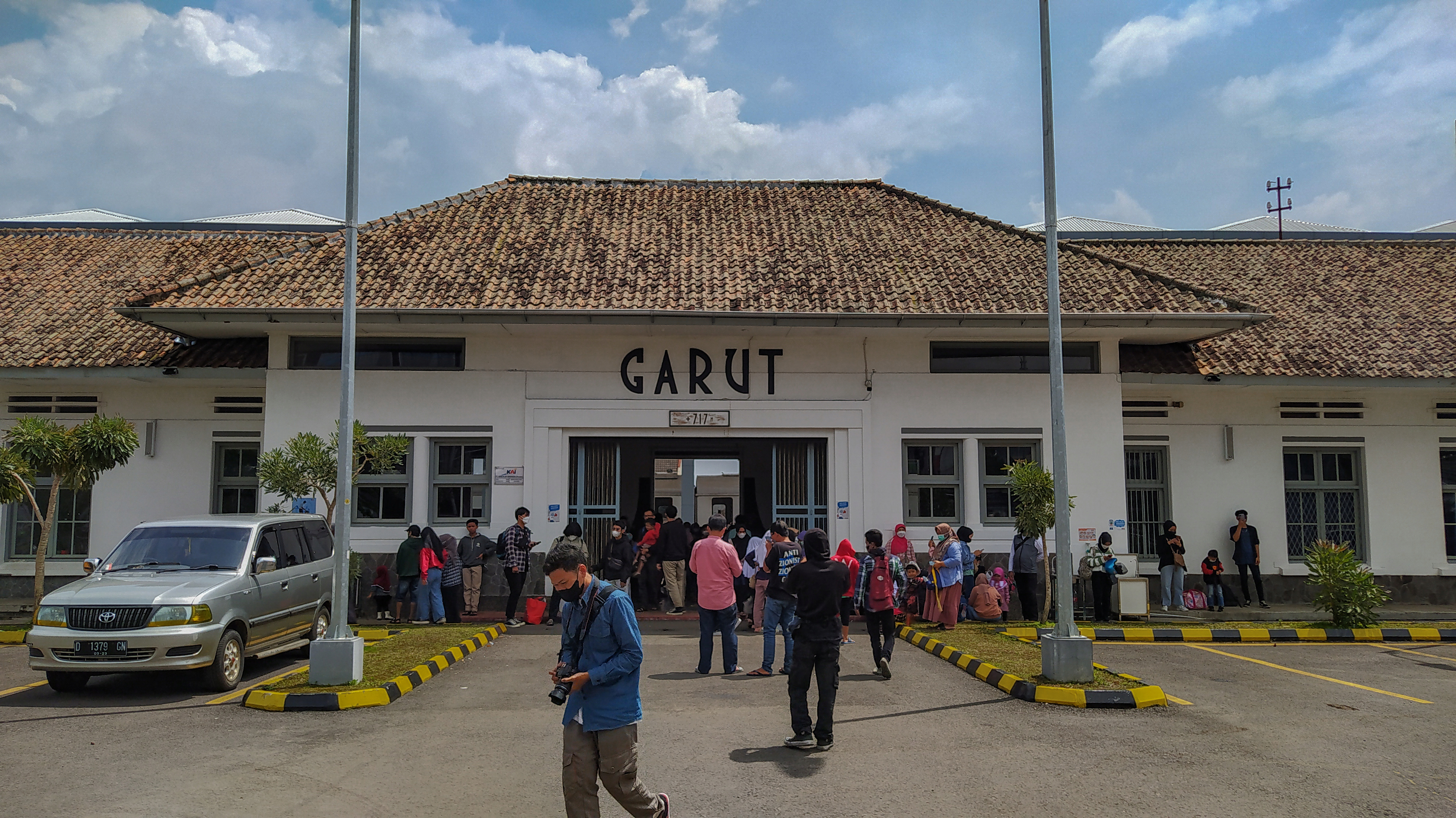
- Front view of Garut Station's old building in April 2022

General information
- Location: Jalan Bank Pakuwon, Garut Kota, Garut Regency, West Java, Indonesia
- Coordinates: 7.2135°S 107.9036°E
- Elevation: 717 metres (2,352 ft)
- Owner: Kereta Api Indonesia
- Manager: Kereta Api Indonesia; KAI Commuter
- Lines: Cibatu–Cikajang; C Garut Commuter Line
- Platforms: 1 side platform 1 island platform
- Tracks: 3

Construction
- Parking: Available
- Accessible: Available

Other information
- Station code: GRT • 1820
- Classification: II

History
- Opened: 14 August 1899
- Closed: 1983–2022
- Rebuilt: 1947; 2019–2020

Key dates
- 2022: Reopening on 24 March
Location
- Location within West Java

Garut Station (GRT) is a class II railway station located in Pakuwon, Garut Kota, Garut Regency, West Java, Indonesia. The station, which is located at an elevation of 717 meters, is operated by Operation Area II Bandung of Kereta Api Indonesia.

The station used to be the main station in Garut Regency, serving passengers and goods. As part of the Cibatu–Cikajang route, it was originally built to connect the southern Java main route with the government center of Garut. The line was later extended to Cikajang. In connection with the Garut people's interest in railways, Garut Station, which had been inactive since 1983, was then revived as part of a railway reactivation program launched by the Ministry of Transportation.

To the east of the station is a railway semaphore signal that was used to control train travel. After reactivation, it was considered obsolete and replaced with a semi-automatic Siemens & Halske signal.

== History ==
Garut Station was built simultaneously with the construction of the Cibatu–Garut line. Because the city center of Garut is quite far from the railway main line, it is considered necessary to create a railway branch. A railway line was built from Cibatu Station to Garut Station. This line opened simultaneously with the line from Cicalengka on 14 August 1889.

The route was opened after going through quite intensive work for two years. Governor General Pijnacker Hordijk, accompanied by his wife, opened the 51 km line at Garut Station.

The old station building has now disappeared, replaced by a more modern building. The station building is very similar to Karawang and Rambipuji stations. In the past, Garut was attacked by the KNIL army in 1947 which damaged the track infrastructure, forcing it to be renovated.

In the past, when it was still active, Garut Station was always crowded with passengers who travel by train until it was finally closed in 1983 because its facilities were old and deemed unable to compete with private cars or public transportation. In addition, PJKA (now KAI) often suffer losses due to stowaway passengers.

During its inactive period, the station building was used as the secretariat of Garut branch of Pancasila Youth, and its yard turned into a market.

=== Reactivation ===
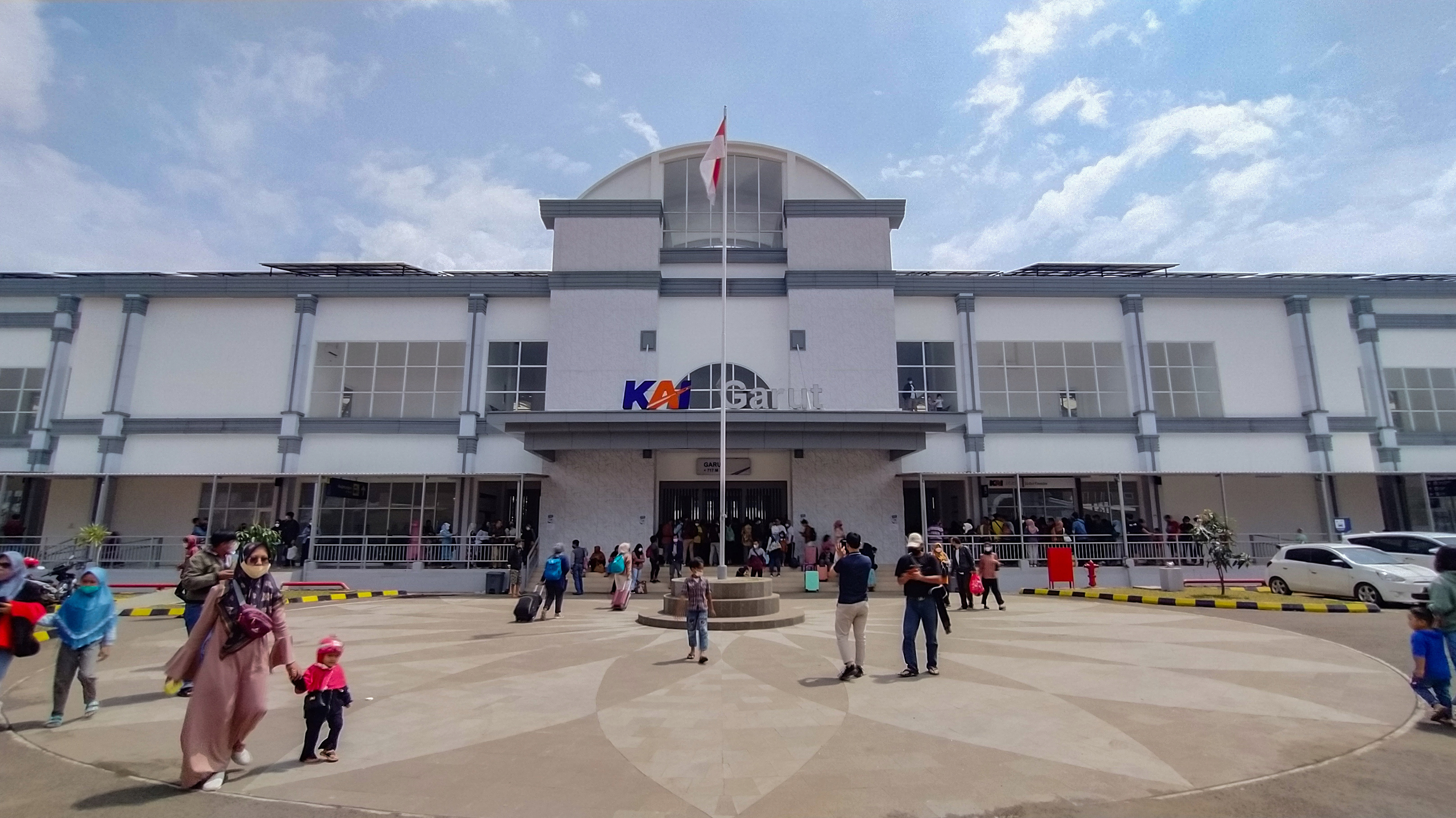
Front view of Garut Station's new building

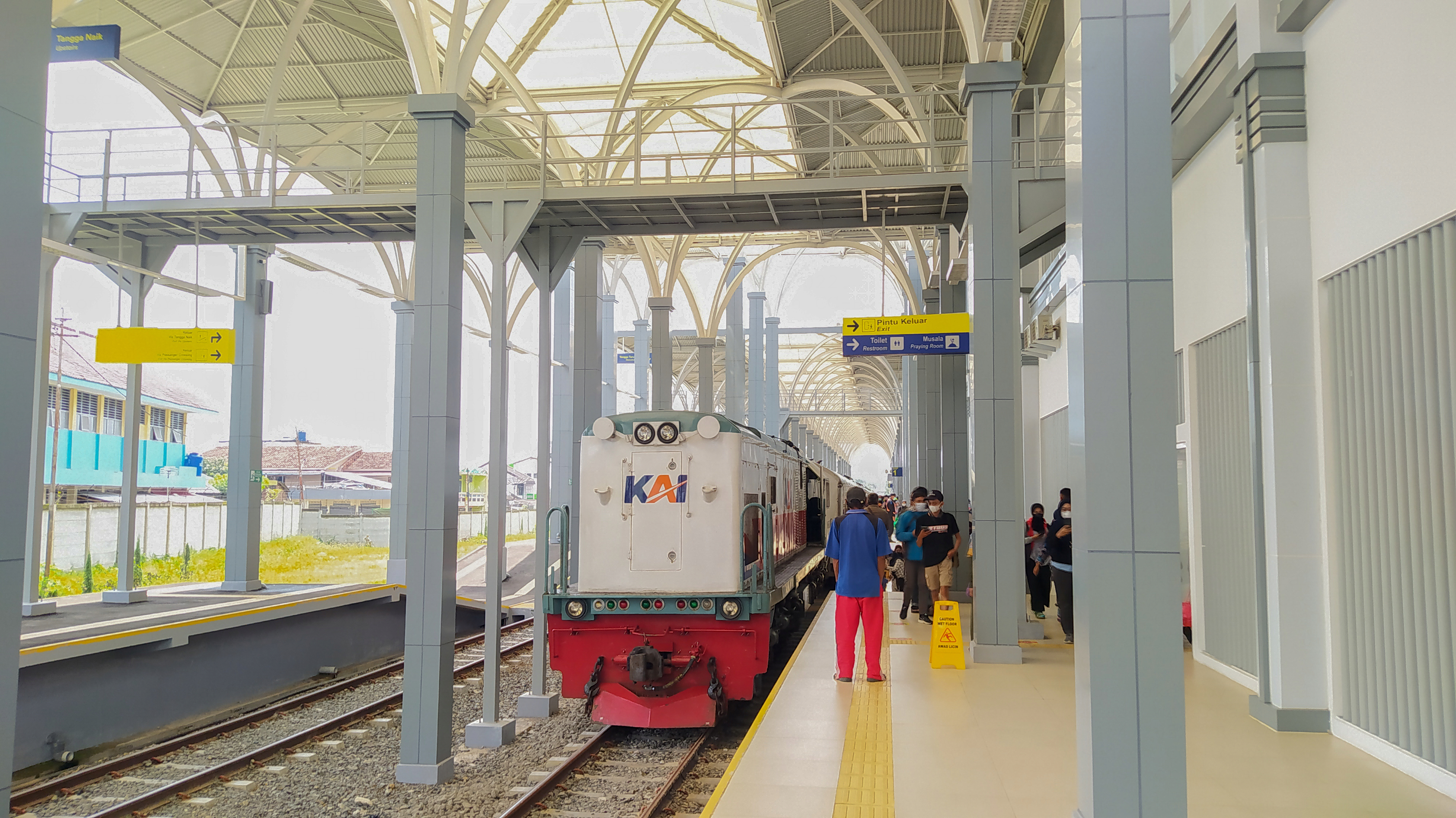
The interior, platform, and canopy of Garut station after the reactivation. The Garut Cibatuan train is seen arriving at track 1

With the reactivation of Cibatu–Garut railway line, Garut Station is undergoing a series of renovations. All buildings standing on KAI's land must be demolished. The buildings located around the official residence left by the Staatsspoorwegen and the station building have been razed to the ground.

Once active, the station is planned to have two buildings and three railway lines with track 1 being a straight track. In addition, a few hundred meters of the railroad tracks westward were also reactivated to support the shunting activities of locomotives and train sets.

Initially, the inauguration of the Cibatu-Garut line was planned for late February or early March 2020, awaiting permission from the Ministry of Transportation. KAI has planned the operation of the Garut Cibatuan local train, which its schedule has been made simultaneously with the enactment of the 2019 train travel chart and serves as a pioneer local transportation. The train is planned to be free during trial period.

The COVID-19 pandemic caused the inauguration to be postponed. Garut Station, along with the line reactivation, was only officially reopened on 24 March 2022.

== Services ==
=== Passenger services ===
==== Inter-city trains ====
Line	Train name	Class	Destination	Notes
Southern Java routes	Papandayan	Panoramic Executive Premium Economy	Jakarta Gambir-Garut	Via Bandung-Purwakarta
Southern Java routes	Cikuray	Economy	Jakarta Pasar Senen–Garut	Via Kiaracondong

==== Local trains ====
Train service name	Destination	Notes
C Garut Commuter Line	Garut–Padalarang	Only morning schedules with one direction
C Garut Commuter Line	Garut–Purwakarta	Trip to Purwakarta only operates at daytime, while the opposite direction operates at night

== Gallery ==
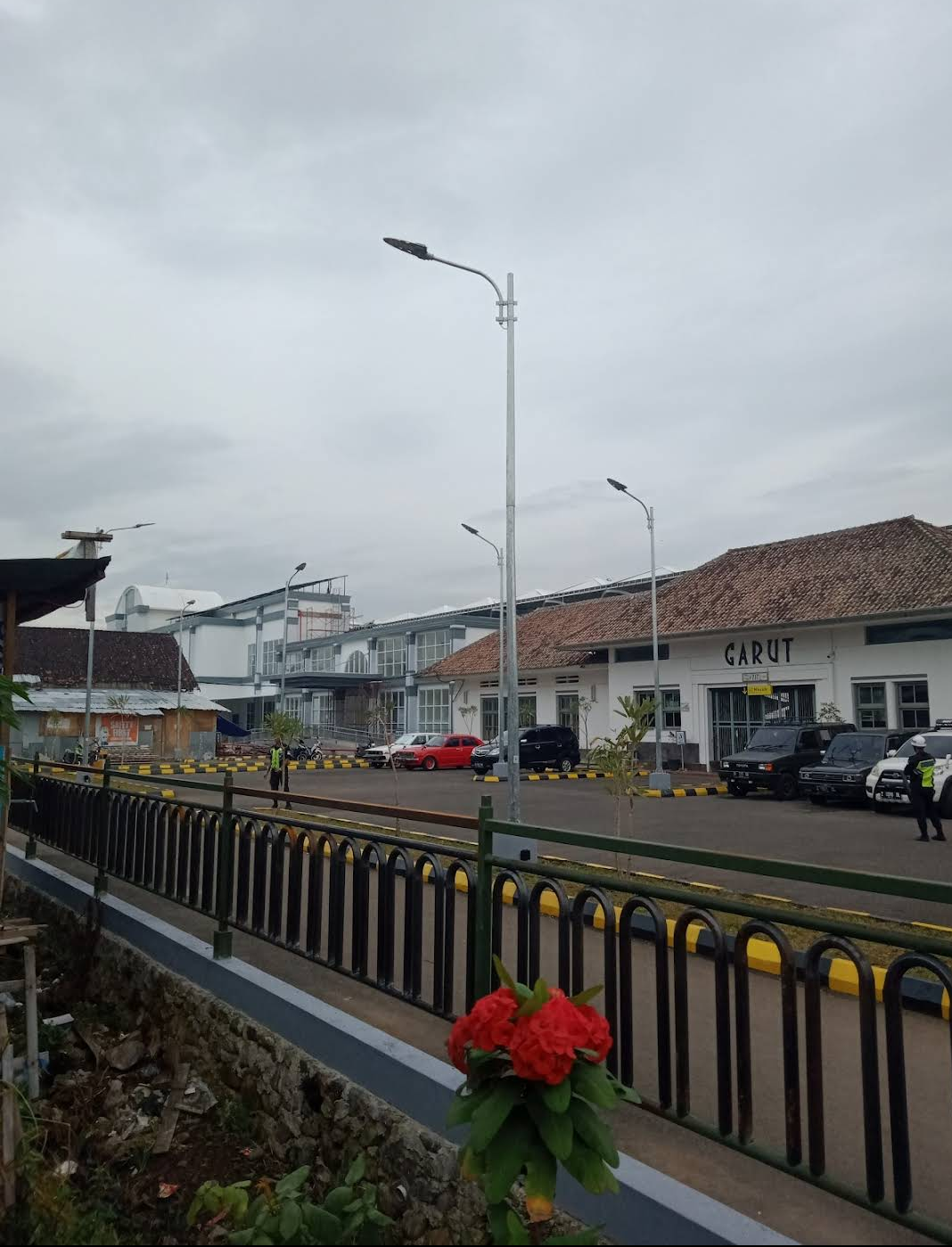
The old building of Garut Station (2021)

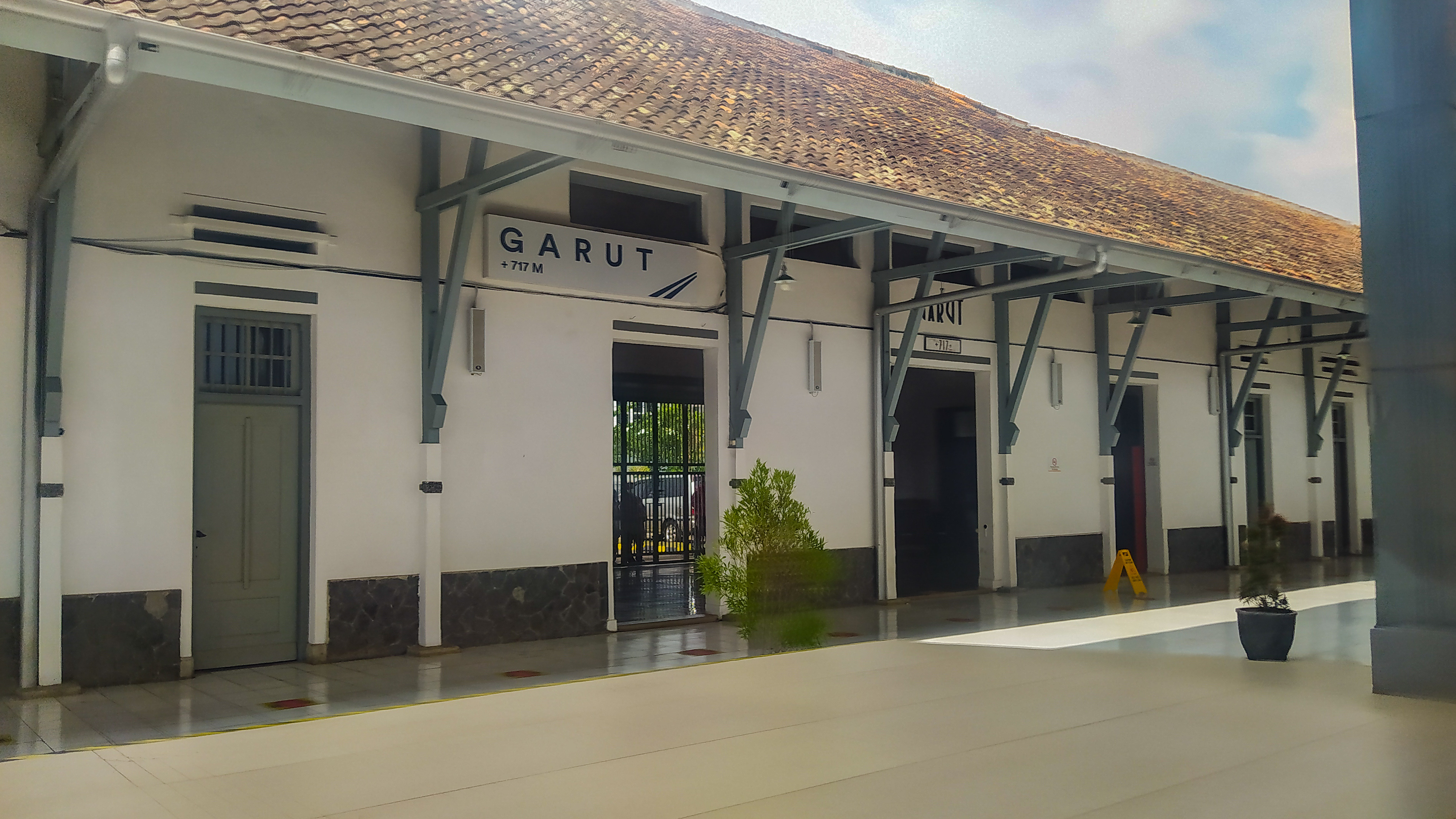
The old building of the station seen from the platform area

Preceding station	Kereta Api Indonesia	Following station
Wanaraja towards Cibatu	Cibatu–Cikajang	~~Pamoyanan~~ towards ~~Cikajang~~
