= Gedangan railway station (Sidoarjo) =

Railway station in Indonesia

Gedangan Station Stasiun Gedangan PD10 A05 J16 SP10

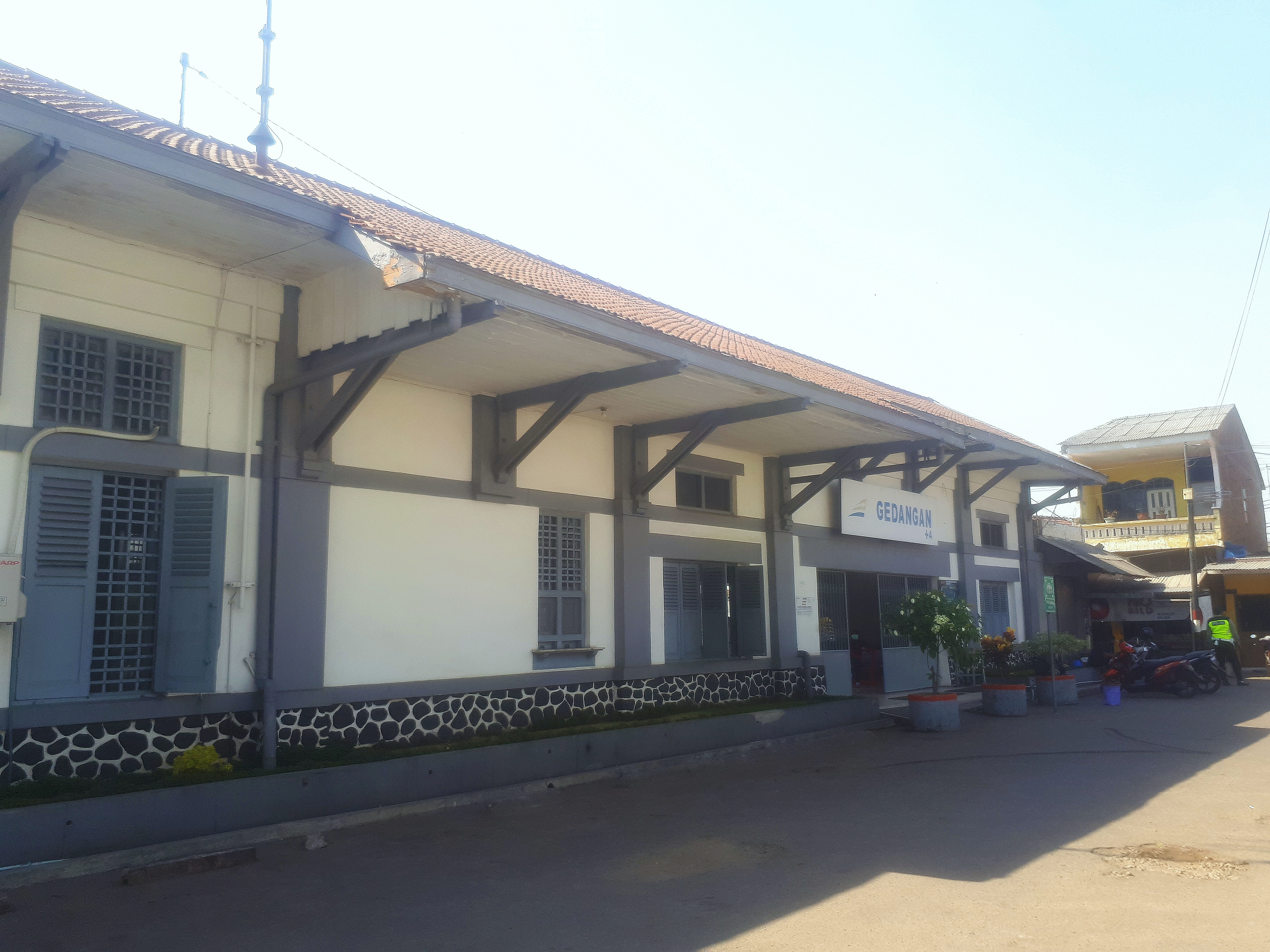
- Gedangan Station, photo was taken on 12 September 2020.

General information
- Location: Jl. Stasiun Gedangan, Gedangan, Gedangan, Sidoarjo Regency; East Java; Indonesia
- Coordinates: 7.38889°S 112.729°E
- Elevation: +4 m (13 ft)
- Owner: Kereta Api Indonesia
- Operator: Kereta Api Indonesia
- Line: Wonokromo–Bangil
- Platforms: 1 island platform 1 side platform
- Tracks: 2

Construction
- Structure type: Ground
- Parking: Available
- Accessible: Available

Other information
- Station code: GDG
- Classification: Class III

History
- Opened: 16 May 1878

Services
Preceding station		Following station
Waru A07 towards Babat or Bojonegoro	Commuter Line Arjonegoro	Sidoarjo A01 Terminus
Waru SP08 towards Surabaya Kota	Commuter Line Supas	Sidoarjo SP14 towards Pasuruan or Probolinggo
Waru J18 towards Indro	Commuter Line Jenggala	Sidoarjo J12 towards Mojokerto
Waru PD08 One-way operation	Commuter Line Penataran East Java Circular Line (clockwise)	Sidoarjo PD14 towards Malang, Blitar, Kertosono or Surabaya Kota
Sidoarjo PD14 One-way operation	Commuter Line Dhoho East Java Circular Line (counter-clockwise)	Waru PD08 towards Surabaya Kota
Location
- Location within Sidoarjo Regency

Gedangan Station (GDG) is a class III railway station located in Gedangan, Gedangan, Sidoarjo Regency, included in Operation Area VIII Surabaya at an altitude of +4 meters.

== Services ==
The following is a list of train services at the Gedangan Station.

- Economy class
  - Penataran, to Surabaya Gubeng or Surabaya Kota and to Blitar
  - Tumapel, to Surabaya Kota and to Malang
  - Local economy:
    - to Sidoarjo and to Bojonegoro
    - to Sidoarjo and to Surabaya Kota
  - Commuter:
    - to Surabaya Kota and to Bangil
    - to Surabaya Pasar Turi and to Indro
    - to Sidoarjo and to Surabaya Kota or Surabaya Pasar Turi
    - to Surabaya Kota and to Pasuruan

Preceding station	Kereta Api Indonesia	Following station
Sawotratap towards Wonokromo	Wonokromo–Bangil	Banjarkemantren towards Bangil
