= Jemursari railway station =

Railway station in Indonesia

Jemursari Station Stasiun Jemursari
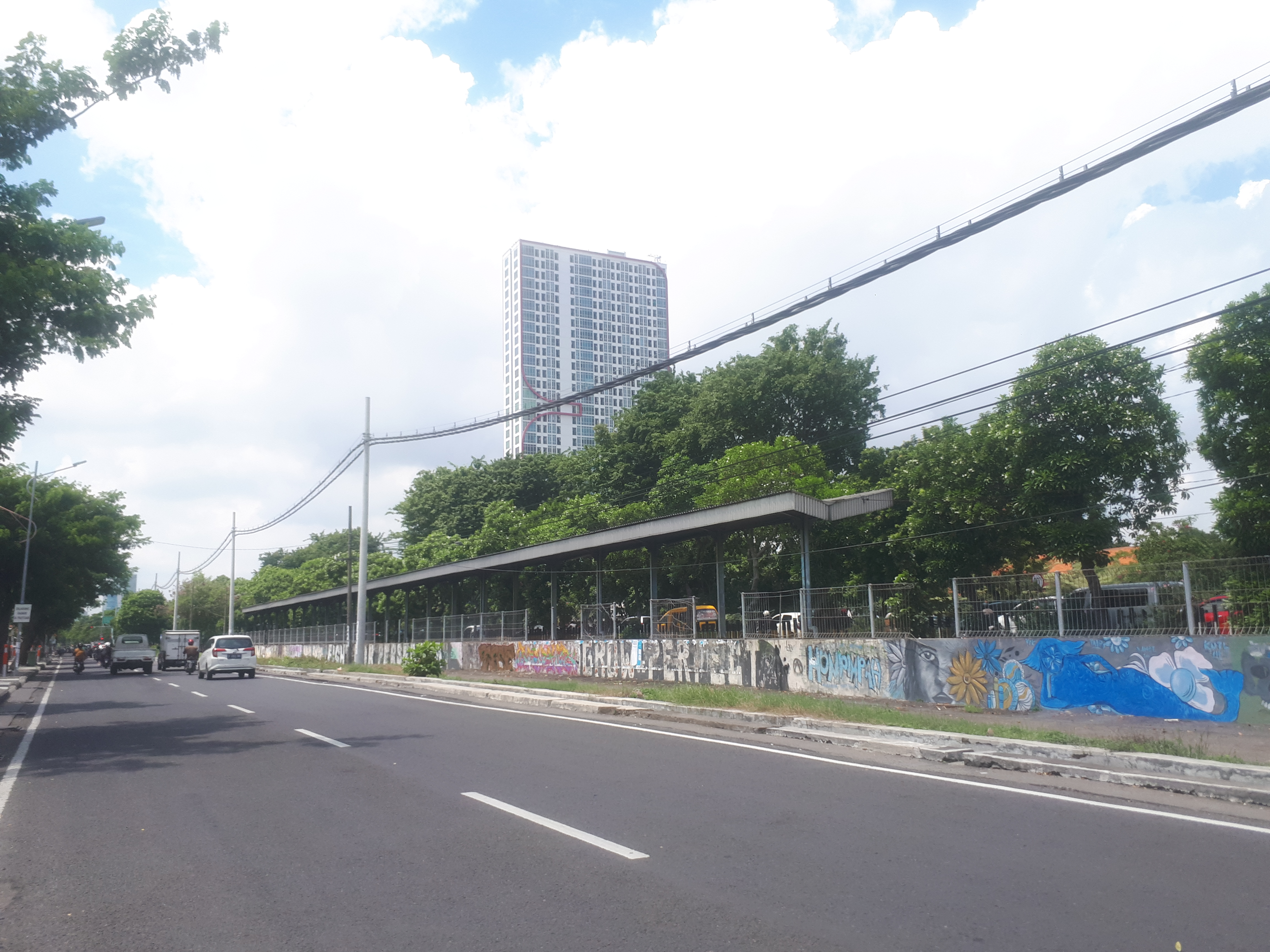
- Jemursari Station

General information
- Location: Jl. Frontage Ahmad Yani, Jemur Wonosari, Wonocolo, Surabaya; East Java; Indonesia
- Coordinates: 7.32937°S 112.731°E
- Owner: Kereta Api Indonesia
- Operator: Kereta Api Indonesia
- Line: Wonokromo–Bangil
- Platforms: 1 side platform
- Tracks: 1

Construction
- Structure type: Ground
- Parking: Unavailable
- Accessible: Available

Other information
- Status: Inactive
- Station code: JMS
- Classification: Halt

History
- Opened: 9 February 2004
- Closed: 10 February 2021
Location
- Location within Surabaya

Jemursari Station (JMS) is an inactive railway station located on the border of Jemur Wonosari and Gayungan. This station was included in the Operation Area VIII Surabaya, to be precise 3 kilometres (1.9 mi) from Wonokromo Station to the south and 2.5 kilometres (1.6 mi) from Waru Station to the north.

Jemursari Station was one of the first railway stations in the city of Surabaya which was built in 2003–2004 during the launch of the Delta Ekspres service for the Surabaya–Sidoarjo connection. This railway station was inaugurated on 9 February 2004, in conjunction with the launch of the Delta Express by President Megawati Sukarnoputri. However, on 10 February 2021, the passenger service at this station was discontinued so that now not a single commuter train service stops at this station.

== Services ==
Starting 10 February 2021 there will be no more passenger services at this station.

Preceding station	Kereta Api Indonesia	Following station
Margorejo towards Wonokromo	Wonokromo–Bangil	~~Kertomenanggal~~ towards Bangil
