= Waru railway station =

Railway station in Indonesia

Waru Station Stasiun Waru PD08 A07 J18 SP08 PB03

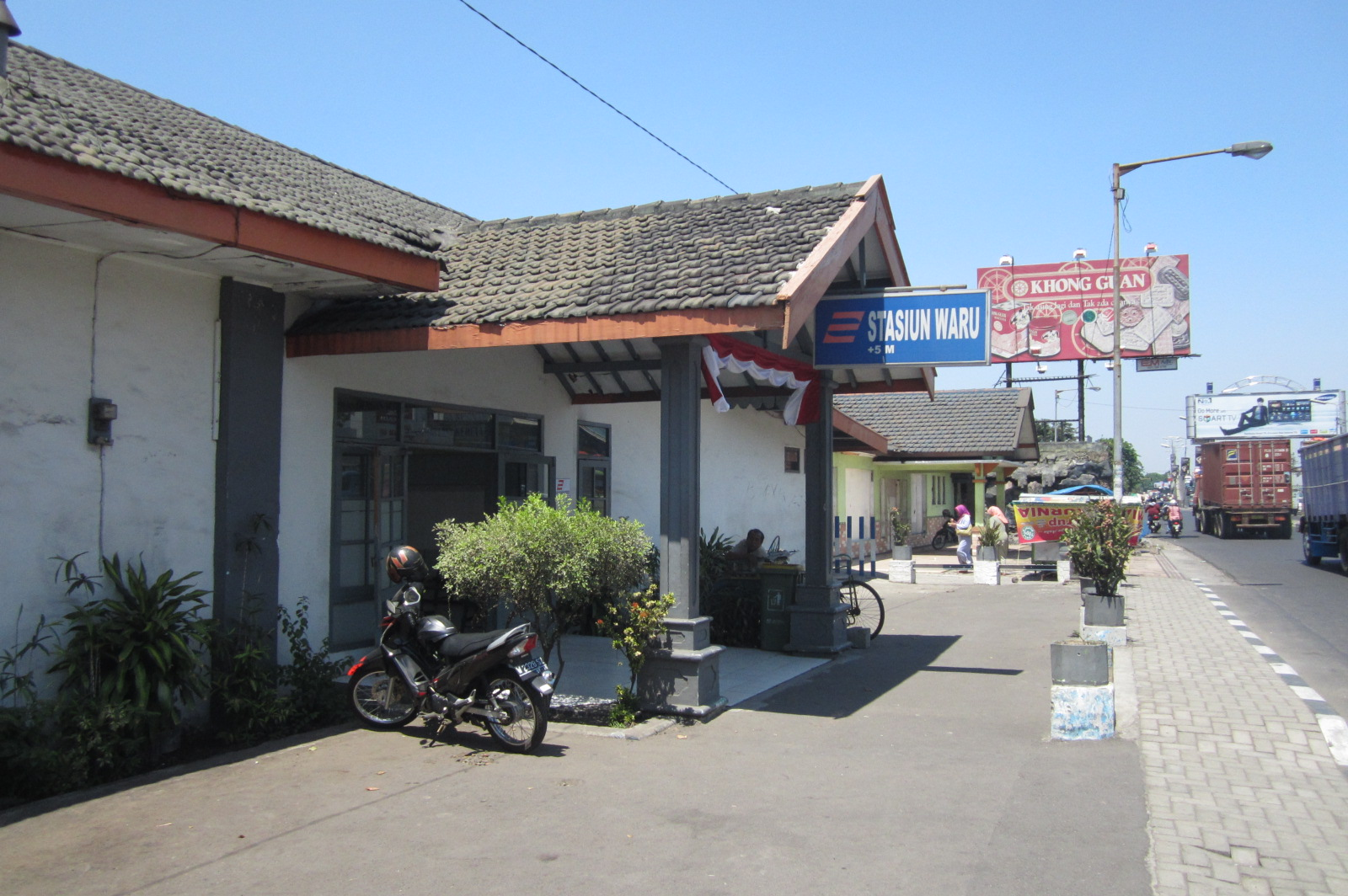
- Waru Station, as of 2011

General information
- Location: Jl. Raya Waru, Kedungrejo, Waru Sidoarjo Regency; East Java; Indonesia
- Coordinates: 7.35264°S 112.729324°E
- Elevation: +5 m (16 ft)
- Owner: Kereta Api Indonesia
- Operator: Kereta Api Indonesia
- Line: Wonokromo–Bangil
- Platforms: 1 side platform 2 island platforms
- Tracks: 4

Construction
- Structure type: Ground
- Parking: Available
- Accessible: Available

Other information
- Station code: WR
- Classification: Class II

History
- Opened: 16 May 1878

Services
Preceding station		Following station
Wonokromo A11 towards Babat or Bojonegoro	Commuter Line Arjonegoro	Gedangan A05 towards Sidoarjo
Wonokromo SP04 towards Surabaya Kota	Commuter Line Supas	Gedangan SP10 towards Pasuruan or Probolinggo
Wonokromo J04 towards Indro	Commuter Line Jenggala	Gedangan J16 towards Mojokerto
Wonokromo PD04 One-way operation	Commuter Line Penataran East Java Circular Line (clockwise)	Gedangan PD10 towards Malang, Blitar, Kertosono or Surabaya Kota
Gedangan PD10 One-way operation	Commuter Line Dhoho East Java Circular Line (counter-clockwise)	Wonokromo PD04 towards Surabaya Kota
Location
- Location within Sidoarjo Regency

Waru Station (WR) is a class II railway station located in Kedungrejo, Waru, Sidoarjo Regency, East Java, Indonesia included in the Operation Area VIII Surabaya at an altitude of +5 meters (16 ft). The station is strategically located on the Surabaya–Sidoarjo main route and close to Purabaya Bus Terminal.

Tracks 3 and 4 were previously used for container loading and unloading activities from Tanjung Priuk and Kalimas, these trains only operate once in two days. However, a plan for the construction of the Waru–Buduran frontage road resulted in the activity being completely moved to Kalimas Station, since early 2015.

== Services ==
The following is a list of train services at the Waru Station.

- Economy class
  - Penataran, to Surabaya Gubeng or Surabaya Kota and to Blitar
  - Probowangi, to Surabaya Gubeng and to Ketapang
  - Tumapel, to Surabaya Kota and to Malang
  - Local economy:
    - to Sidoarjo and to Bojonegoro
    - to Sidoarjo and to Surabaya Kota
  - Commuter:
    - to Surabaya Kota and to Bangil
    - to Surabaya Pasar Turi and to Indro
    - to Sidoarjo and to Surabaya Kota or Surabaya Pasar Turi
    - to Surabaya Kota and to Pasuruan

Preceding station	Kereta Api Indonesia	Following station
Kertomenanggal towards Wonokromo	Wonokromo–Bangil	~~Sawotratap~~ towards Bangil
