= Kertomenanggal railway station =

Railway station in Indonesia

Kertomenanggal Station Stasiun Kertomenanggal
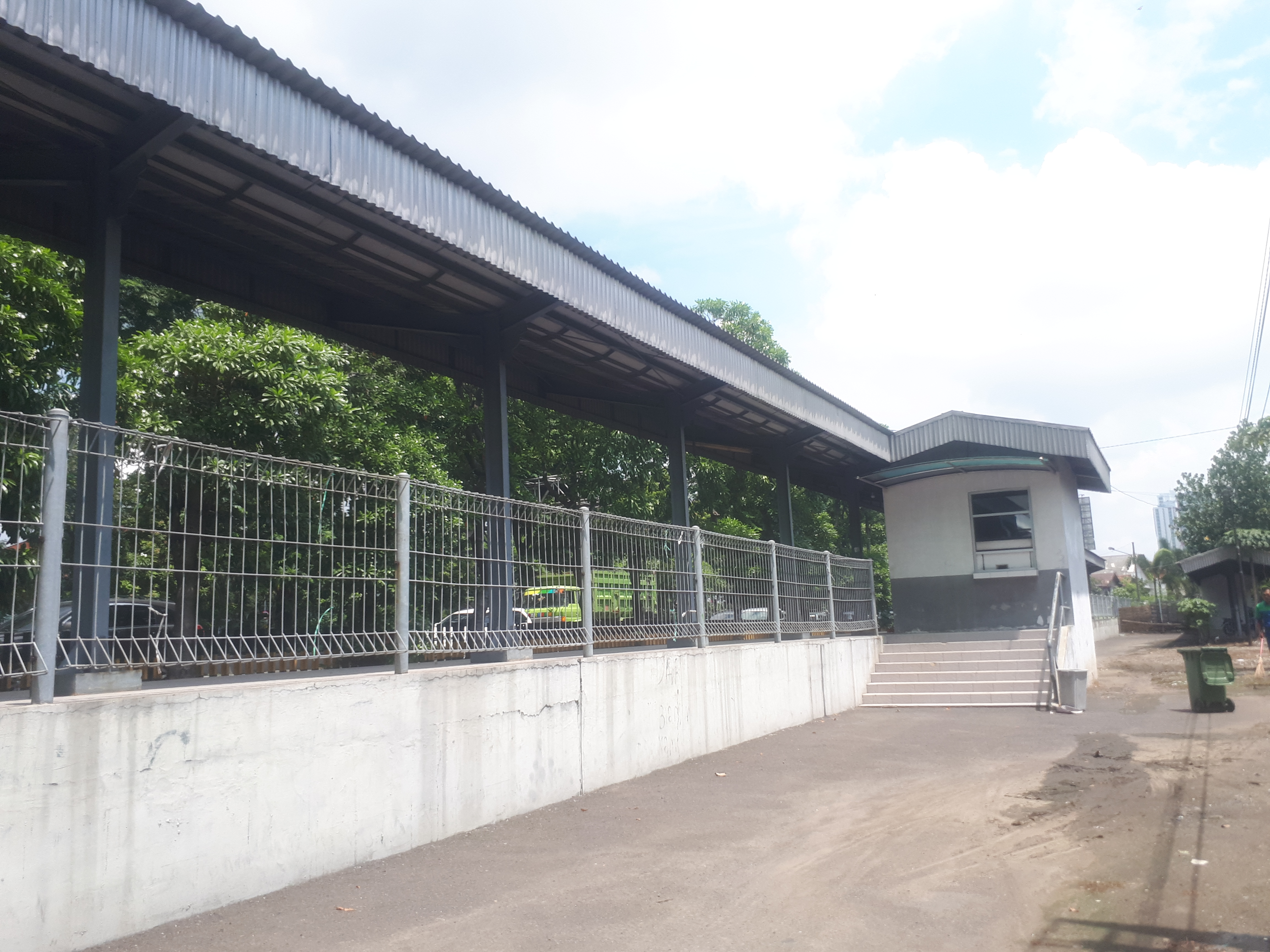
- Kertomenanggal Station

General information
- Location: Jl. Frontage Ahmad Yani, Menaggal, Wonocolo, Surabaya; East Java; Indonesia
- Coordinates: 7.340578°S 112.729508°E
- Owner: Kereta Api Indonesia
- Operator: Kereta Api Indonesia
- Line: Wonokromo–Bangil
- Platforms: 1 side platform
- Tracks: 1

Construction
- Structure type: Ground
- Parking: Unavailable
- Accessible: Available

Other information
- Status: Inactive
- Station code: KTL
- Classification: Halt

History
- Opened: 9 February 2004
- Closed: 10 February 2021
Location
- Location within Surabaya

Kertomenanggal Station (KTL) is an inactive railway station located in Menanggal, Gayungan, Surabaya. This station is included in the Operation Area VIII Surabaya and is a railway station that is located in the southernmost city of Surabaya.

This station is 1.2 km (0.75 mi) from Waru Station to the north, to be precise near the Surabaya Golkar Building. The location of this station is also close to one of the modern shopping centers in Surabaya called City of Tomorrow.

This station was inaugurated on 9 February 2004, along with the launch of the Delta Express by President Megawati Soekarnoputri. However, on 10 February 2021, the passenger service at this station was discontinued so that now not a single commuter train service stops at this station.

== Services ==
Starting 10 February 2021 there will be no more passenger services at this station.

Preceding station	Kereta Api Indonesia	Following station
~~Jemursari~~ towards Wonokromo	Wonokromo–Bangil	Waru towards Bangil
