= Sawotratap railway station =

Railway station in Indonesia

Sawotratap Station Stasiun Sawotratap
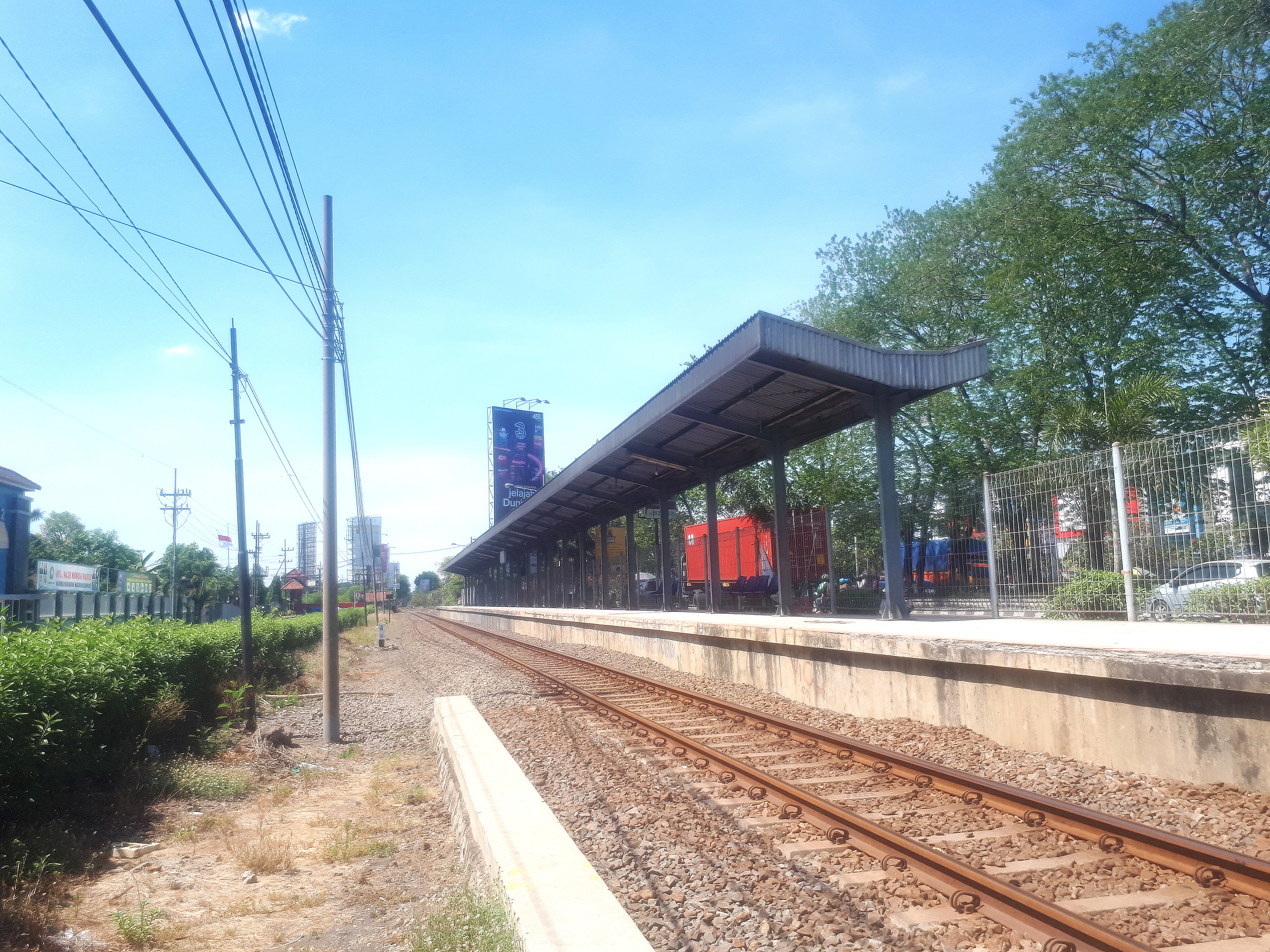
- Sawotratap Station platform on 11 October 2020

General information
- Location: Sawotratap, Gedangan, Sidoarjo Regency; East Java; Indonesia
- Coordinates: 7.3685°S 112.729°E
- Owner: Kereta Api Indonesia
- Operator: Kereta Api Indonesia
- Line: Wonokromo–Bangil
- Platforms: 1 side platform
- Tracks: 1

Construction
- Structure type: Ground
- Parking: Available
- Accessible: Available

Other information
- Status: Inactive
- Station code: STP
- Classification: Halt

History
- Opened: 9 February 2004
- Closed: 10 February 2021
- Former names: Makro Halt
Location
- Location within Sidoarjo Regency

Sawotratap Station (STP) is an inactive railway station located in Sawotratap, Gedangan, Sidoarjo Regency. The station is included in the Operation Area VIII Surabaya. Previously, the station only served the Surabaya–Bangil Commuter service.

This station was inaugurated on 9 February 2004, along with the launch of the Delta Express by President Megawati Soekarnoputri. However, since the enactment of the timetable schedule according to 2021 timetable as of 10 February 2021, passenger services at this station have been removed so that now there is not a single commuter train service that stop at this station.

== Services ==
Starting 10 February 2021 there will be no more passenger services at this station.

Preceding station	Kereta Api Indonesia	Following station
Waru towards Wonokromo	Wonokromo–Bangil	Gedangan towards Bangil
