= Sidoarjo railway station =

Railway station in Indonesia

Sidoarjo Station Stasiun Sidoarjo PD14 A01 J12 SP14 PB04

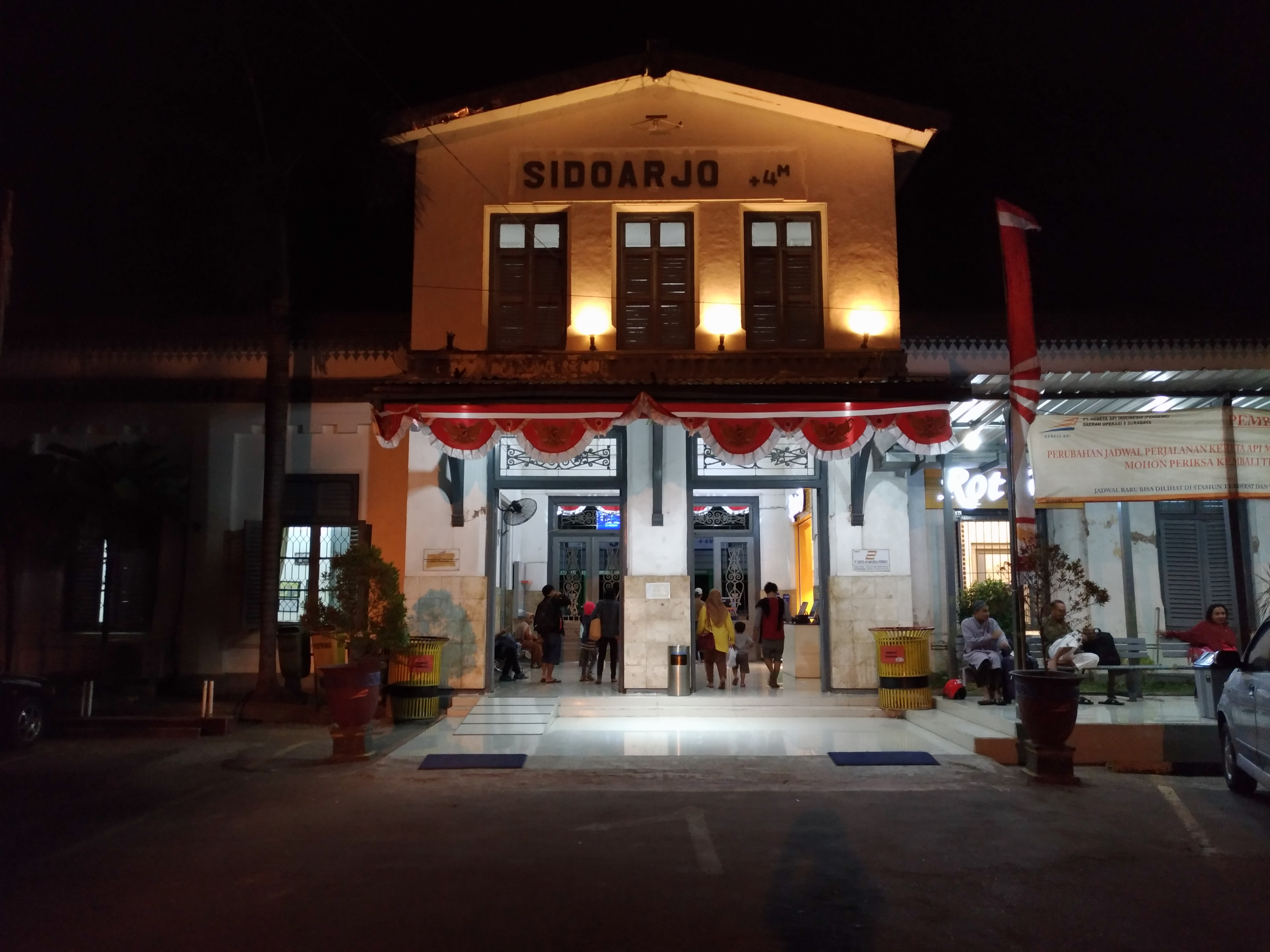
- Main entrance of Sidoarjo Station

General information
- Location: Jl. Diponego, Lemahputro, Sidoarjo, Sidoarjo Regency; East Java; Indonesia
- Coordinates: 7.4569°S 112.7129°E
- Elevation: +4 m (13 ft)
- Owner: Kereta Api Indonesia
- Operator: Kereta Api Indonesia
- Line: Wonokromo–Bangil
- Platforms: 2 side platforms 3 island platforms
- Tracks: 4
- Connections: Trans Jatim: JTM1

Construction
- Structure type: Ground
- Parking: Available
- Cycle facilities: Available
- Accessible: Available

Other information
- Station code: SDA • 4654
- Classification: I

History
- Opened: 16 May 1878; 148 years ago
- Former names: Sidhoardjo Station

Services
Preceding station		Following station
Gedangan A05 towards Babat or Bojonegoro	Commuter Line Arjonegoro	Terminus
Gedangan SP10 towards Surabaya Kota	Commuter Line Supas	Tanggulangin SP15 towards Pasuruan or Probolinggo
Gedangan J16 towards Indro	Commuter Line Jenggala	Tulangan J11 towards Mojokerto
Gedangan PD10 One-way operation	Commuter Line Penataran East Java Circular Line (clockwise)	Tanggulangin PD15 towards Malang, Blitar, Kertosono or Surabaya Kota
Tanggulangin PD15 One-way operation	Commuter Line Dhoho East Java Circular Line (counter-clockwise)	Gedangan PD10 towards Surabaya Kota
Location
- Location within Sidoarjo Regency

Sidoarjo Station (SDA) is a railway station located in Lemahputro, Sidoarjo, Sidoarjo Regency, East Java, Indonesia. The station passes the railway to the east (Jember-Banyuwangi) and the path to Malang-Blitar. The station located at the height of + 4 meters is included in the Operation Area VIII Surabaya.

== Building and layout ==
The station initially had seven tracks with track 1 as a straight track, but track 5 has now been evicted for new platforms and tracks 6 and 7 have now been evicted in 1992 for the purpose of shop development. Formerly this station contained locomotive depot and warehouse, but was demolished in 1992 due to the construction of shop.

From track 4, the dead track that leads to Tarik is reactivated as part of the relocation of the Wonokromo–Bangil railway line following the hot mudflow in Porong.

As a first-class train station, almost all trains stop at this station. Only freight trains (tank and cement) are passing directly / do not stop.

== Services ==
Passenger trains that use this station are:

=== Mixed class ===
- Mutiara Timur, to Ketapang (and Denpasar for night trip only with DAMRI bus connecting trip) and Surabaya Gubeng (executive - premium economy)
- Ranggajati, to Cirebon via Surabaya Gubeng and Jember (executive - business)
- Logawa, to Purwokerto via Surabaya Gubeng and Jember (business - economy)

=== Economy class ===
- Jayabaya to Pasar Senen via Surabaya Pasar Turi and Malang
- Sri Tanjung, to Lempuyangan via Surabaya Kota and Ketapang
- Probowangi, to Ketapang and Surabaya Gubeng

=== Commuter and Local train ===
- Komuter Subang, to Surabaya Kota and Bangil
- Penataran Commuter Line, to Blitar via Malang and Surabaya Kota
- Lokal Bojonegoro, to Bojonegoro via Surabaya Pasar Turi
- Jenggala Commuter Line, to Mojokerto via Tulangan

== Supporting transportation ==
Public transportarion type	Route	Destination
Trans Jatim	1	Porong–Purabaya–Bunder

== Gallery ==
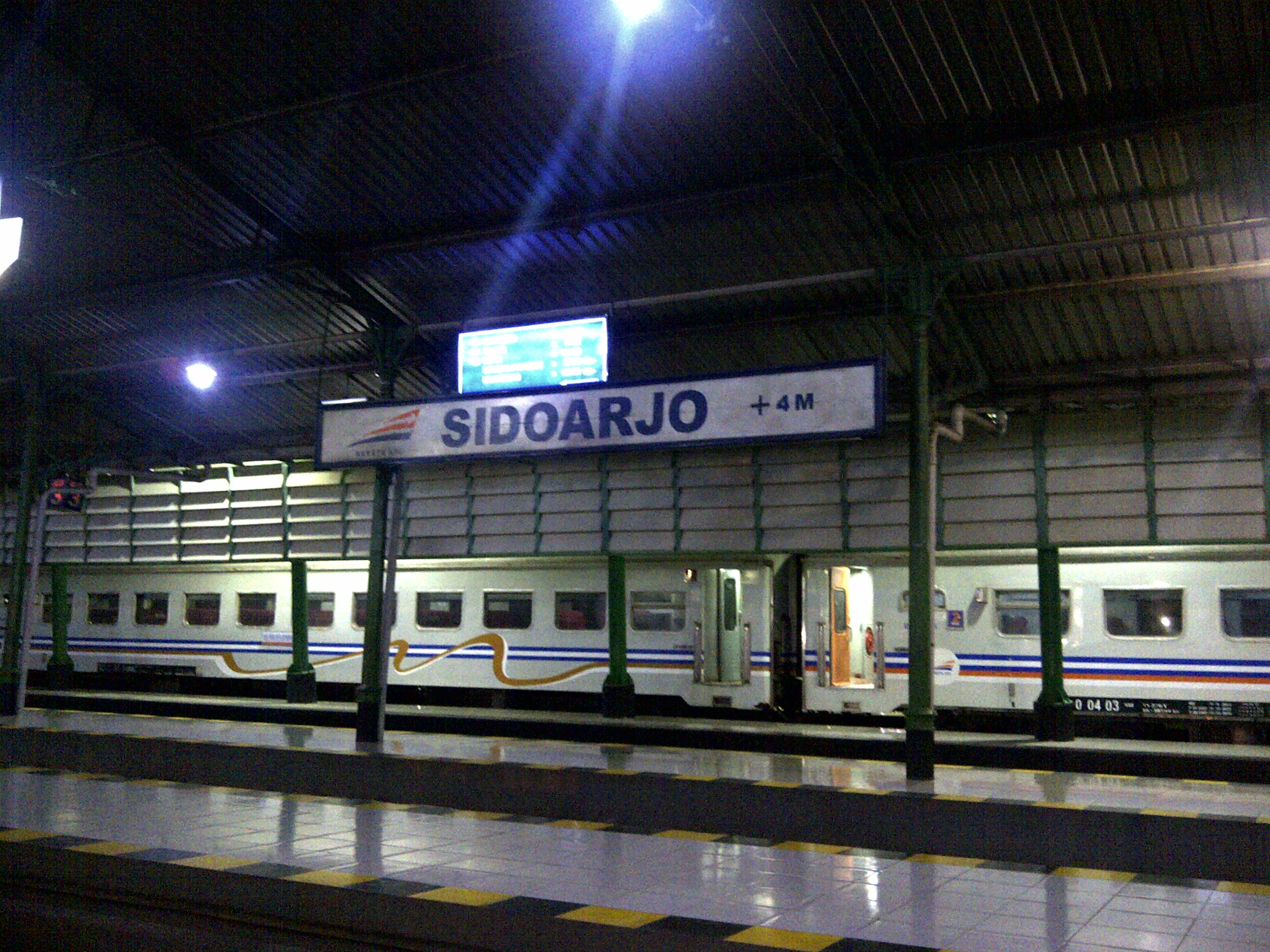
The station platform at night with old version of the signage (2017)

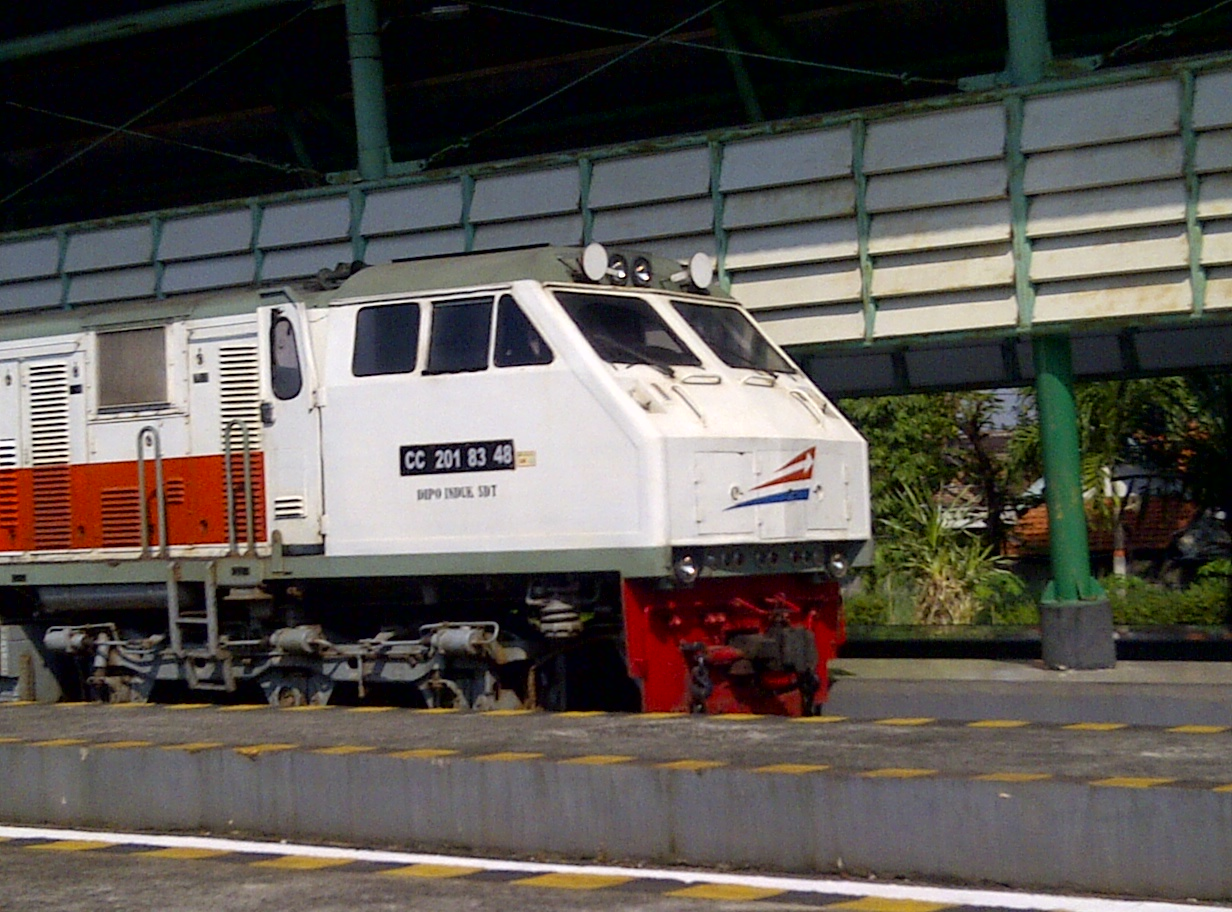
CC201 19R Locomotive entering the station

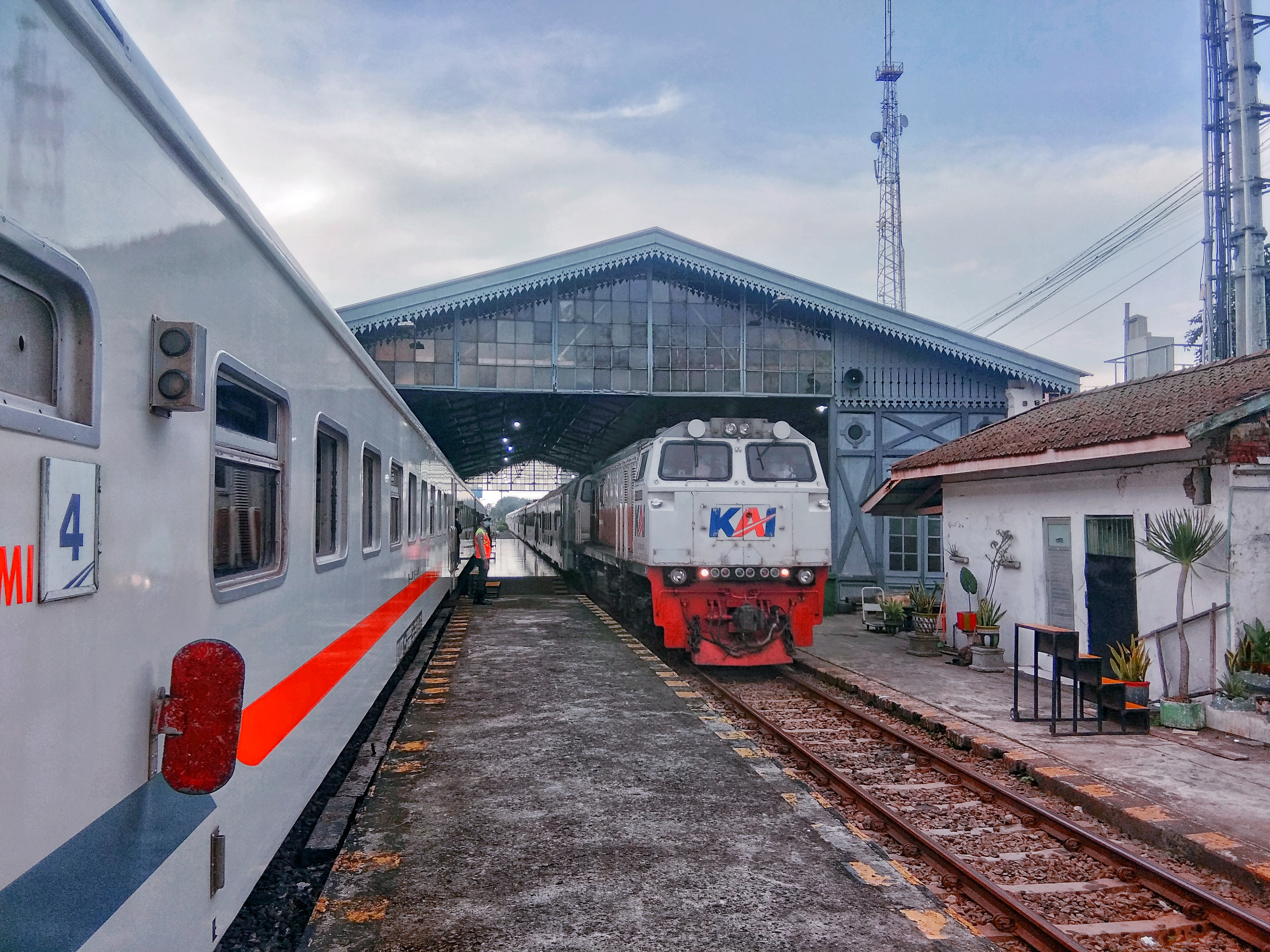
The south side of the platform (2022)

Preceding station	Kereta Api Indonesia	Following station
Pagerwojo towards Wonokromo	Wonokromo–Bangil	Tanggulangin towards Bangil
Terminus	SDA-TRK	Tulangan towards Tarik
