= Wonokromo railway station =

Railway station in Indonesia

Wonokromo railway station Stasiun Wonokromo PD04 J04 PB02 SP04 A11

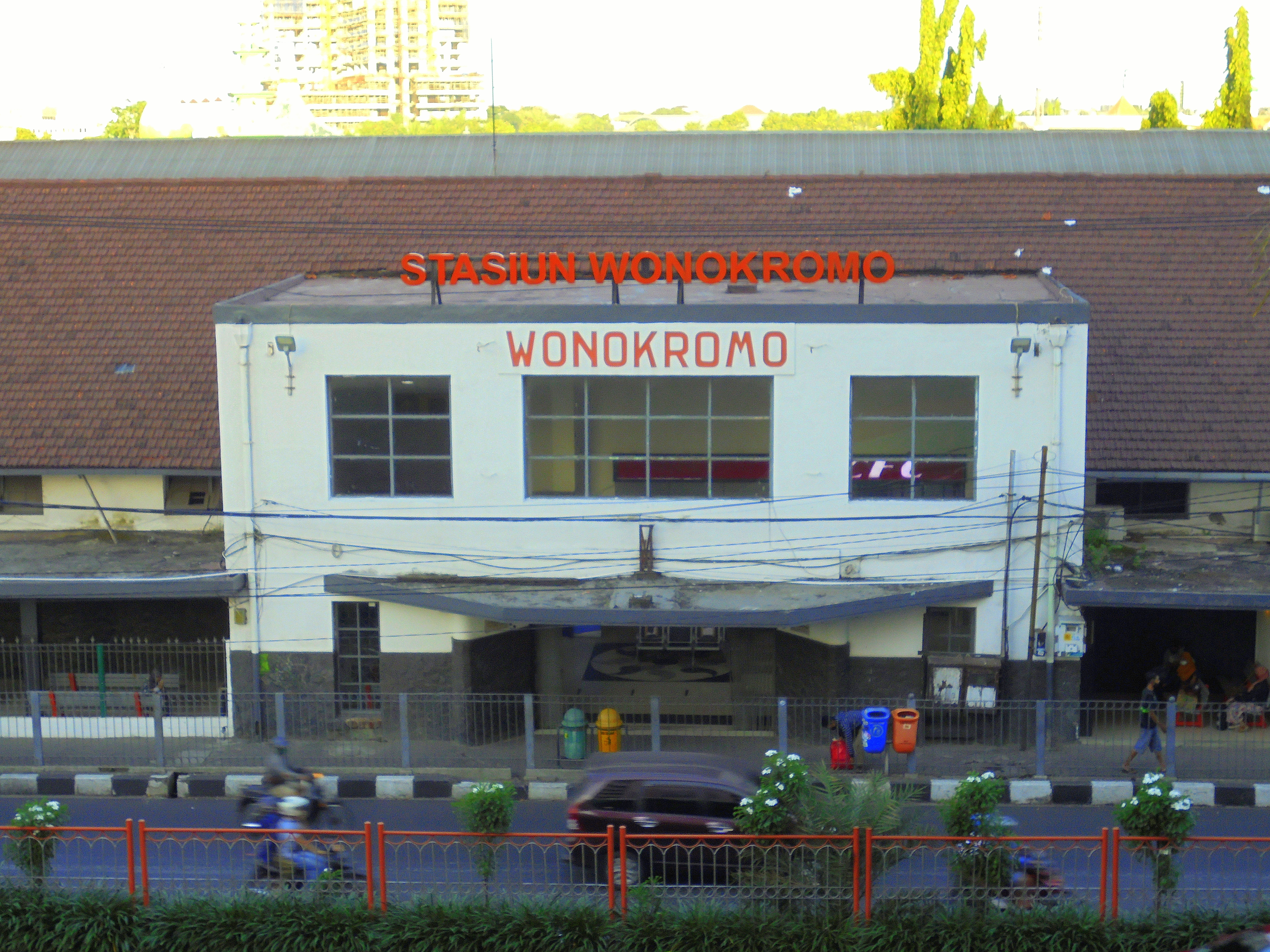
- Wonokromo Station, photo was taken on 21 June 2020

General information
- Location: Jagir, Wonokromo, Surabaya; East Java; Indonesia
- Coordinates: 7.301883°S 112.739100°E
- Elevation: +7 m (23 ft)
- Owner: Kereta Api Indonesia
- Operator: Kereta Api Indonesia
- Lines: Kertosono–Wonokromo; Wonokromo–Bangil; Surabaya Railway
- Platforms: 1 side platform 3 island platforms
- Tracks: 5
- Connections: Suroboyo Bus: R1 R2 R7

Construction
- Structure type: Ground
- Parking: Available
- Accessible: Available

Other information
- Station code: WO • 4530
- Classification: Large type C

Services
Preceding station		Following station
Surabaya Gubeng A13 towards Babat or Bojonegoro	Commuter Line Arjonegoro	Waru A07 towards Sidoarjo
Surabaya Gubeng SP02 towards Surabaya Kota	Commuter Line Supas	Waru SP08 towards Pasuruan or Probolinggo
Surabaya Gubeng J02 towards Indro or Babat	Commuter Line Jenggala via Sepanjang	Sepanjang J05 towards Mojokerto
Surabaya Gubeng J02 towards Indro	Commuter Line Jenggala via Sidoarjo	Waru J18 towards Mojokerto
Surabaya Gubeng PD02 One-way operation	Commuter Line Penataran East Java Circular Line (clockwise)	Waru PD08 towards Malang, Blitar, Kertosono or Surabaya Kota
Sepanjang PD59 One-way operation	Commuter Line Penataran East Java Circular Line (clockwise)	Surabaya Gubeng PD02 towards Surabaya Kota
Surabaya Gubeng PD02 One-way operation	Commuter Line Dhoho East Java Circular Line (counter-clockwise)	Sepanjang PD59 towards Kertosono, Blitar, Malang or Surabaya Kota
Waru PD08 One-way operation	Commuter Line Dhoho East Java Circular Line (counter-clockwise)	Surabaya Gubeng PD02 towards Surabaya Kota
Location
- Location within Surabaya

Wonokromo Station (WO) is a large class type C railway station in Jagir, Wonokromo, Surabaya, East Java, operated by Kereta Api Indonesia. The station is located about 5 kilometers (3 mi) south of Surabaya Gubeng Station. It is close to the railway junction with each directions to Surabaya Gubeng station, Sidoarjo, and Madiun.

The station's name must be distinguished from Wonokromo Kota Station. Wonokromo Station is the legacy of Staatsspoorwegen, while Wonokromo Kota Station is the former station of Surabaya tram network built by Oost-Java Stoomtram Maatschappij during Dutch era.

== Building and layout ==
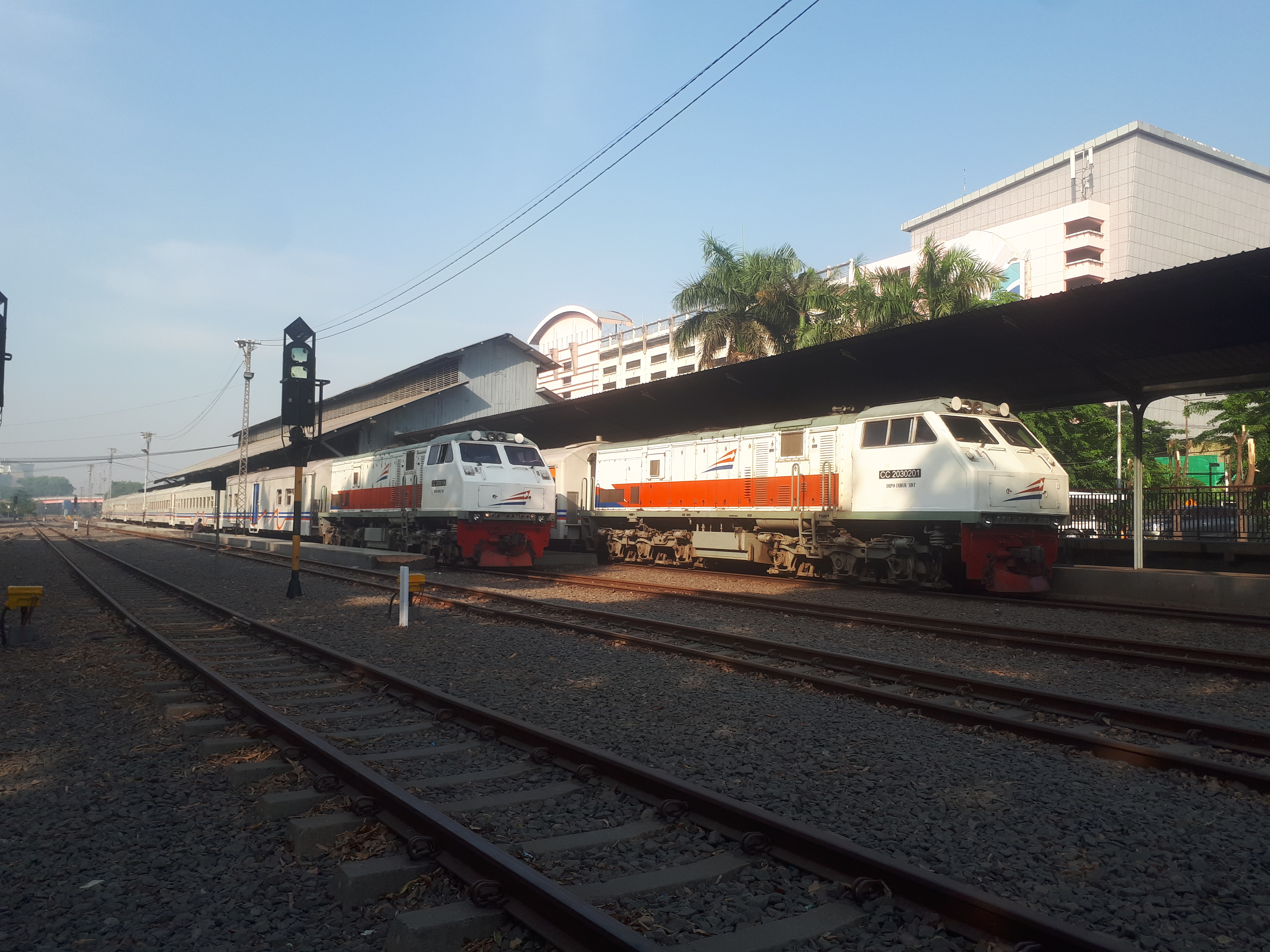
The station yard with Penataran and Kertosono local economy trains

The station has 5 tracks, but the tracks usually used are platform 1, 2, and 3. Track 1 is used for train going to Madiun, Solo Balapan, Yogyakarta, Purwokerto, Bandung and Jakarta Kota. Track 2 is used for train going to Sidoarjo, Malang, Pasuruan, Probolinggo, Jember and Ketapang (Banyuwangi).

There is a former locomotive warehouse/depot to the north of the station which is expected to operate when the double track was put into use, currently the building is a storage warehouse for local residents. On a railway bridge across Jagir River north of the station, there are also former foundations for the railway bridge leading to Ngagel industrial area.

== Services ==
=== Passenger services ===
==== Mixed class ====
- Gaya Baru Malam Selatan, destination of Surabaya Gubeng and Pasar Senen
- Logawa, destination of Purwokerto and Jember (business-economy)
- Mutiara Selatan, destination of Surabaya Gubeng and Malang (executive-economy)
- Ranggajati, destination of Surabaya Gubeng (executive-business)

==== Economy class ====
- Pasundan, destination of Surabaya Gubeng and Kiaracondong
- Probowangi, destination of Surabaya Gubeng and Ketapang
- Sri Tanjung, destination of Lempuyangan and Ketapang

==== Lokal or Commuter ====
- Komuter Supor, destination of Surabaya Kota and Bangil
- Dhoho, destination of Surabaya Kota and Blitar via Kertosono
- Penataran, destination of Surabaya Kota and Blitar via Malang
- Tumapel, destination of Surabaya Kota and Malang
- Lokal Bojonegoro, destination of Bojonegoro-Surabaya Pasar Turi and Sidoarjo
- Lokal Kertosono, destination of Surabaya Kota and Kertosono

== Supporting transportation ==
Source: Surabaya City Transportation Agency

Public transportation type	Route	Destination
City bus	A2	Purabaya–Ngagel–Surabaya Kota station
Bemo	F	Joyoboyo–Ngagel–Endrosono
Bemo	H1	Sepanjang–Wonokromo
Bemo	P	Petojo–Joyoboyo
Bemo	P	Kenjeran–Petojo–Joyoboyo
Bemo	P	Ketintang–Petojo
Bemo	P	Kenjeran–Gebang Putih–Joyoboyo
Bemo	S	Joyoboyo–Bratang–Kenjeran
Bemo	JBM	Keputih–Bratang–Joyoboyo
Bemo	GL	Gadung–Pasar Loak
Bemo	H2P	Wonokromo market–Pagesangan–Menanggal–Purabaya
Bemo	H4W	Wonokromo market–Rungkut Industri–Sedati
Bemo	U	Joyoboyo–Jagir–Wonokromo–Rungkut Menanggal
Suroboyo Bus	R1	Purabaya–Rajawali (transfer at Joyoboyo bus stop)
Suroboyo Bus	R2	Rajawali–Purabaya (transfer at Joyoboyo 2 bus stop)
Suroboyo Bus	R7	Joyoboyo–Jono Soewojo (transfer at Joyoboyo bus stop)

== Incidents ==
- On 22 June 2002 at 21:00, the fuel-carrying train caught fire at Wonokromo Station. There were no casualties in this incident.

Preceding station	Kereta Api Indonesia	Following station
Sepanjang towards Kertosono	Kertosono–Wonokromo	Surabaya Gubeng
Terminus	Wonokromo–Bangil	Margorejo towards Bangil
Terminus	Wonokromo–Surabaya Gubeng; WO-SGU	Ngagel towards Surabaya Gubeng
