= Greater Surabaya Commuter Line =

Commuter rail system in Greater Surabaya, Indonesia

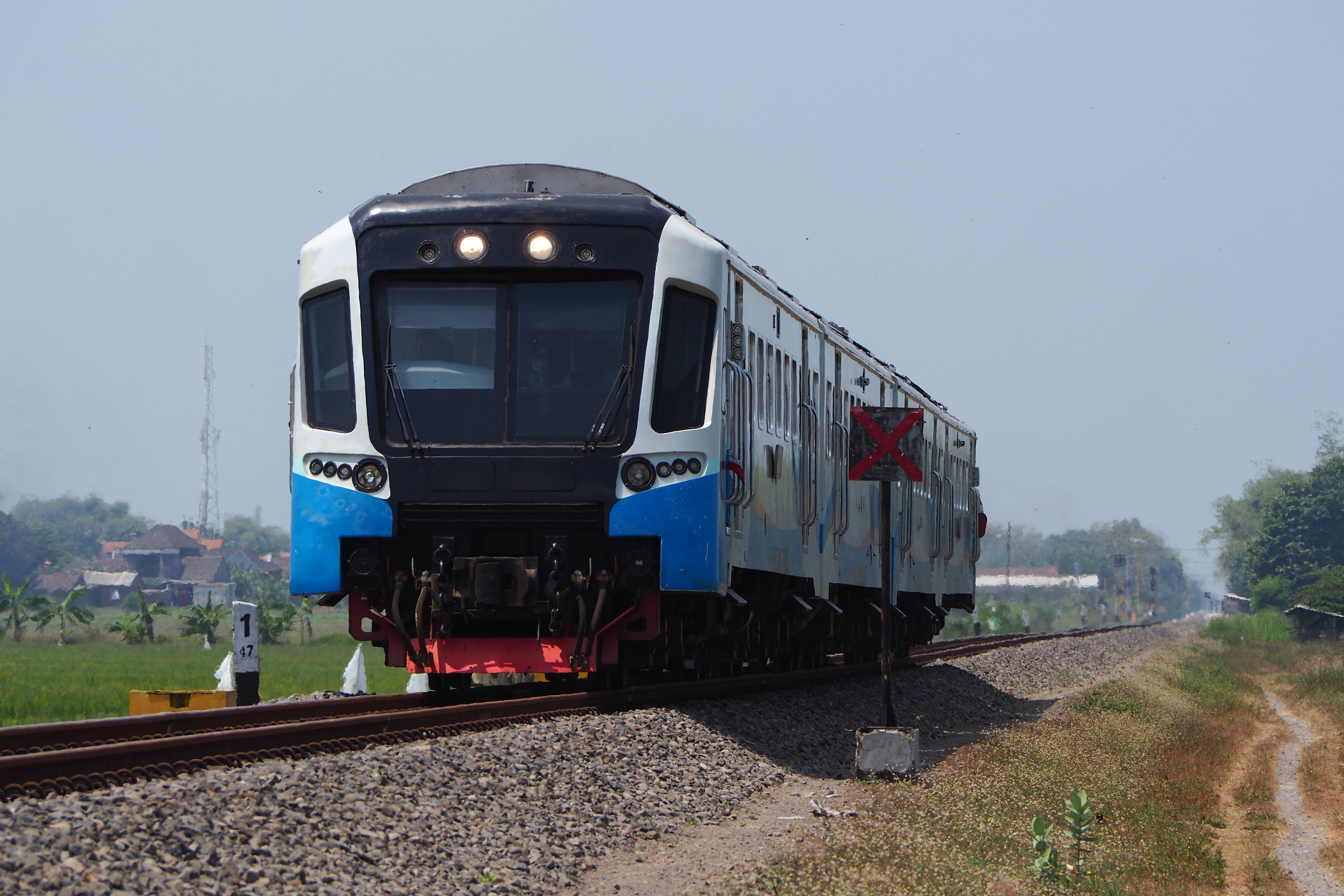
- KA Jenggala passing Tarik, Sidoarjo Regency

Overview
- Native name: KA Komuter Surabaya–Bangil; KA Komuter Supas; KA Komuter Jenggala; KA Komuter Sindro; KA Komuter Blorasura; KA Komuter Arjonegoro; KA Komuter Dhoho; KA Komuter Penataran; KA Komuter Tumapel
- Owner: Kereta Api Indonesia
- Locale: East Java (Surabaya, Gresik Regency, Lamongan Regency, Pasuruan Regency, Sidoarjo Regency, Mojokerto City, Mojokerto Regency, also Malang and Blitar)
- Transit type: Commuter rail
- Number of lines: 7
- Daily ridership: 52,502 (Highest); 43,881 (Average, 2025)
- Annual ridership: 16.02 million (2025)
- Headquarters: Surabaya, Indonesia
- Website: www.kai.id www.commuterline.id

Operation
- Operators: KAI Commuter (Surabaya area); Kereta Api Indonesia (Jember area)
- Rolling stock: INKA Kereta Rel Diesel Indonesia (KRDI) DMU

Technical
- Track gauge: 1,067 mm (3 ft 6 in)
- Top speed: 80 km/h (50 mph)

Commuter rails in Surabaya metropolitan area consists of separate commuter-type local train services operated by KAI Commuter in Surabaya, East Java, Indonesia, and its surrounding areas, such as Gresik, Mojokerto, Pasuruan, Sidoarjo, Bojonegoro and Lamongan with Commuter Line Supas (KA Komuter Supas), Commuter Line Jenggala (KA Komuter Jenggala), Commuter Line Sindro (KA Komuter Sindro), Commuter Line Arjonegoro (KA Komuter Arjonegoro), and Commuter Line Blorasura (KA Komuter Blorasura) trains, also Malang and Blitar with Commuter Line Dhoho (KA Komuter Dhoho), Commuter Line Penataran (KA Komuter Penataran), and Commuter Line Tumapel (KA Komuter Tumapel)

These trains currently use INKA-built Kereta Rel Diesel Indonesia (KRDI) diesel multiple unit (DMU) for their service.

== Greater Surabaya Commuter trains ==
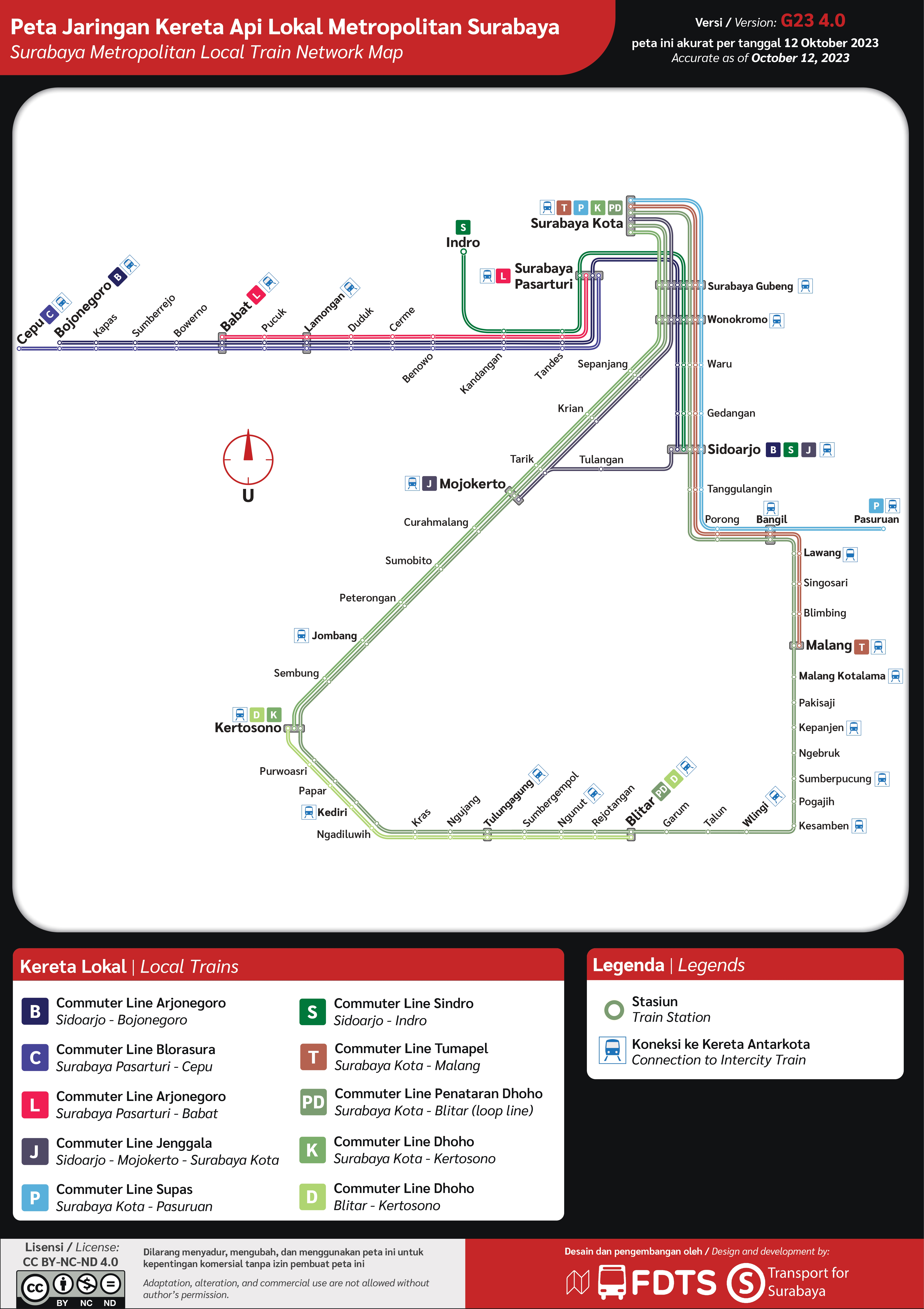
The map of Commuter rail of Surabaya as per October 2023

- Commuter Line Supas is a commuter train serving Surabaya Kota station for Pasuruan station and vice versa. The train was first launched on 9 February 2004 as Delta Express and inaugurated by President Megawati Sukarnoputri, serving Surabaya and Sidoarjo. Several stops were built by KAI along the Surabaya–Sidoarjo railway line to support the train's operation, but in 2021 all stops were closed. The route was extended further to Porong station in December 2017, and finally to Bangil station starting from December 2019. Formerly using Nippon Sharyo-built MCW 302 DMU, currently the train using KRDI DMU for its service. An extended line of KA Komuter Surabaya–Bangil, it was launched on 10 February 2021 as the 2021 train timetable (Gapeka 2021) was started.
- Commuter Line Jenggala is a commuter train serving Surabaya Kota station for Mojokerto station and Sidoarjo station, vice versa. First operating on 12 November 2014, the train is the first train operating in the reactivated Tarik–Sidoarjo railway line.
- Commuter Line Sindro is a commuter train serving Sidoarjo station for Indro station in Gresik and vice versa. First operating on 10 February 2021, the train is the first train operating in the partly reactivated, previously freight-only Indro–Kandangan railway line.
- Commuter Line Blorasura is a commuter train serving Surabaya Pasar Turi station for Cepu station in Blora and vice versa with a stop in Lamongan station. Between 2004-2023, the line that served Lamongan station was called "Sulam", from the abbreviation for Surabaya and Lamongan, indicating the train terminus. On June 1, 2023, followed by the enactment of the 2023 train timetable (Gapeka 2023), the "Sulam" commuter train was merged with the Blorasura which serves the same line.
- Commuter Line Arjonegoro is a local economy train route Sidoarjo–Surabaya Pasarturi–Bojonegoro has a distance of 133 kilometers which takes about 3 hours 45 minutes. This train serves passenger stops at all stations on the Sidoarjo–Bojonegoro route, except Surabaya Station and Gembong Station.

== Other commuter trains ==
Besides the aforementioned trains, there are a number of medium-range commuter trains services between Surabaya and several cities/regencies:

- Commuter Line Dhoho and Commuter Line Penataran, two train routes starting from Surabaya Kota station for Blitar station and vice versa via Kertosono for Dhoho and Malang for Penataran (make a stop in each station excluding Ngagel).
- Commuter Line Tumapel, starting from Surabaya Kota station to Malang station, vice versa.

Between 2009 and 2013, KA Arek Surokerto ([id], Arek Surokerto Train) was operational, serving Surabaya Gubeng station for Mojokerto station and vice versa, and make a stop in each station. "Arek Surokerto" stands for Angkutan Rakyat Ekonomi Kecil Surabaya-Mojokerto (Small Economy People's Transport Surabaya-Mojokerto). The train was using INKA-built electro-diesel train as its rolling stock.

== Gallery ==
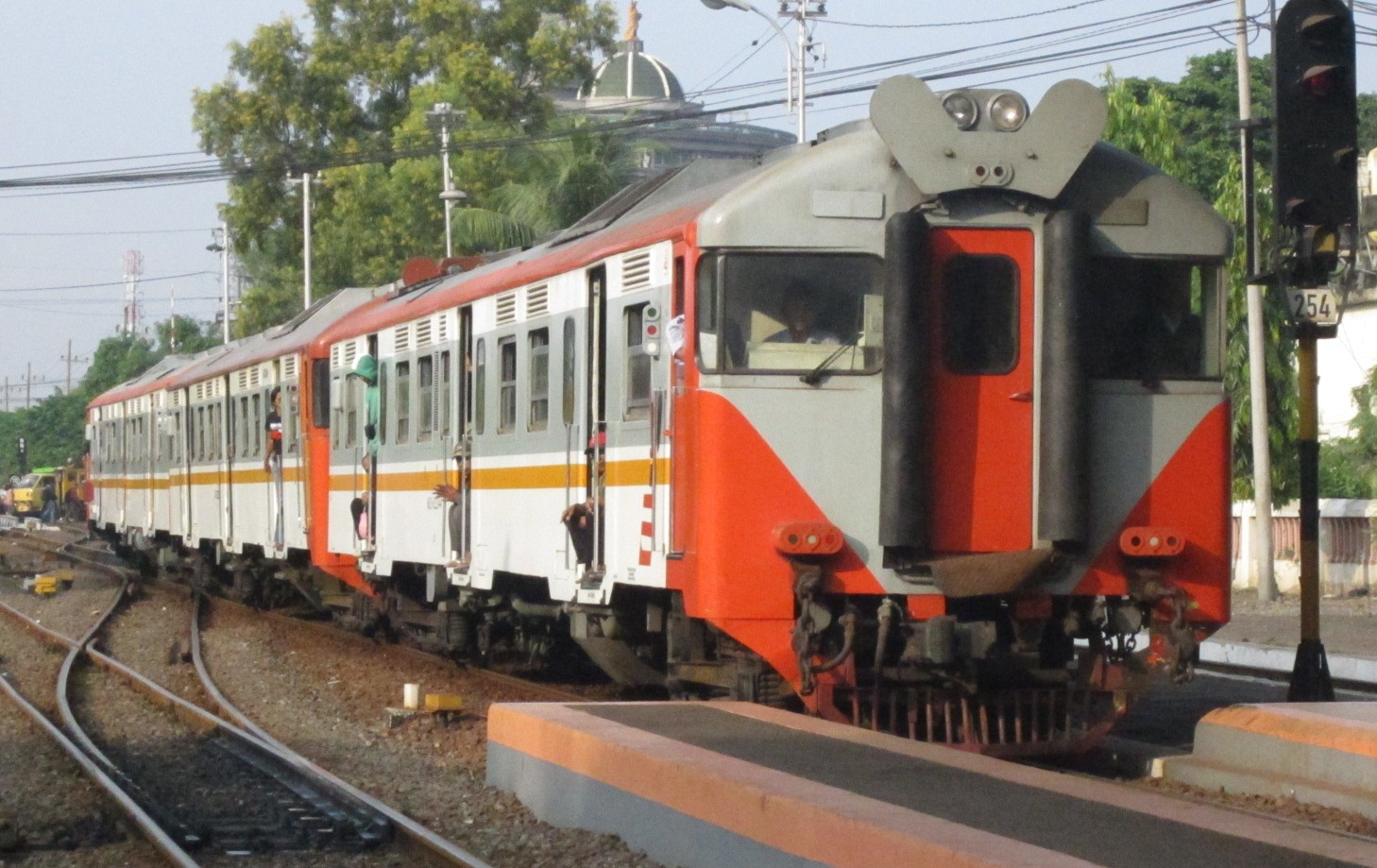
Delta Express (currently Commuter Line Supas) trainset in Surabaya Gubeng Station, 2011.

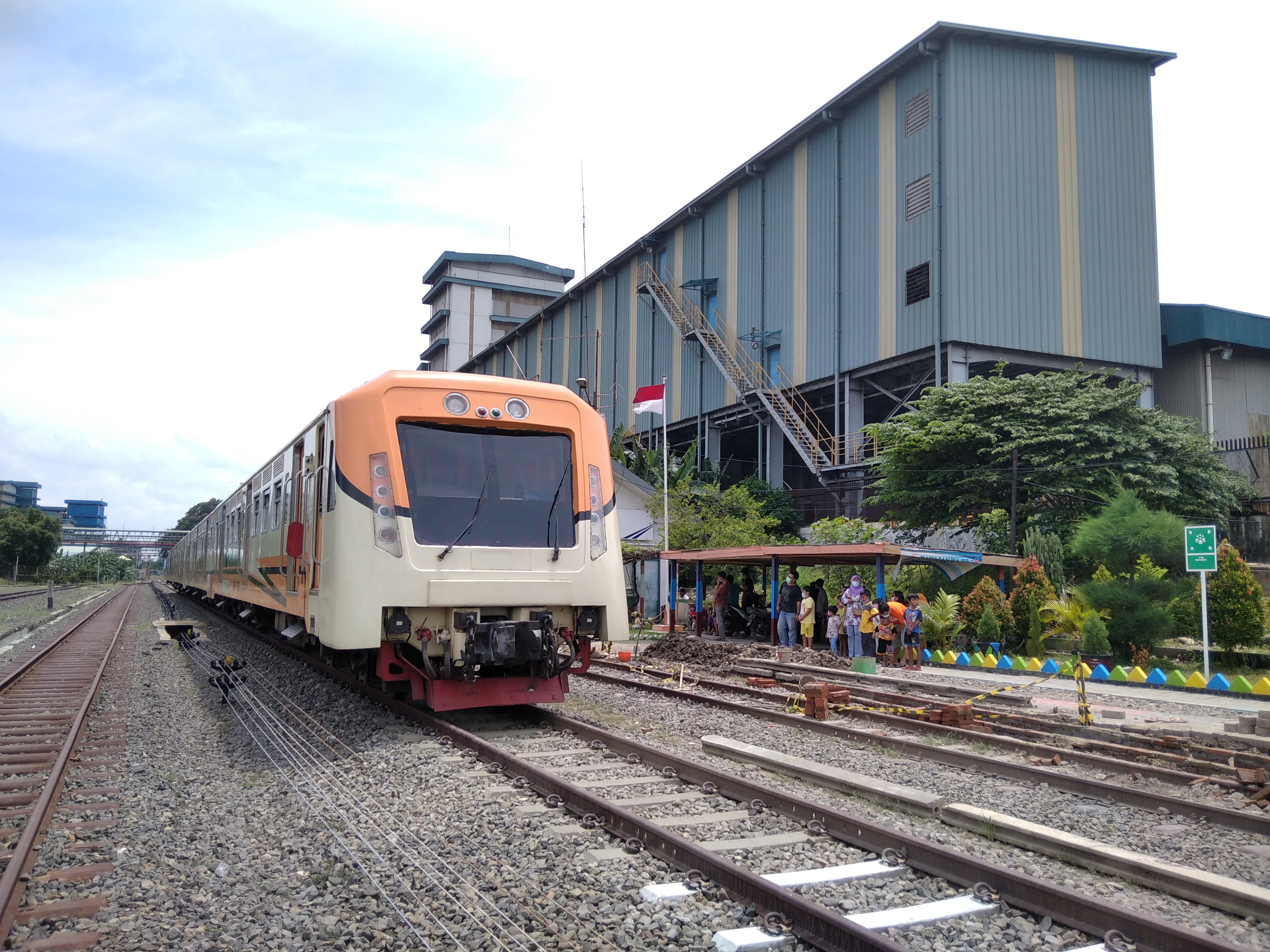
Commuter Line Sindro trainset in Indro Station, Gresik.

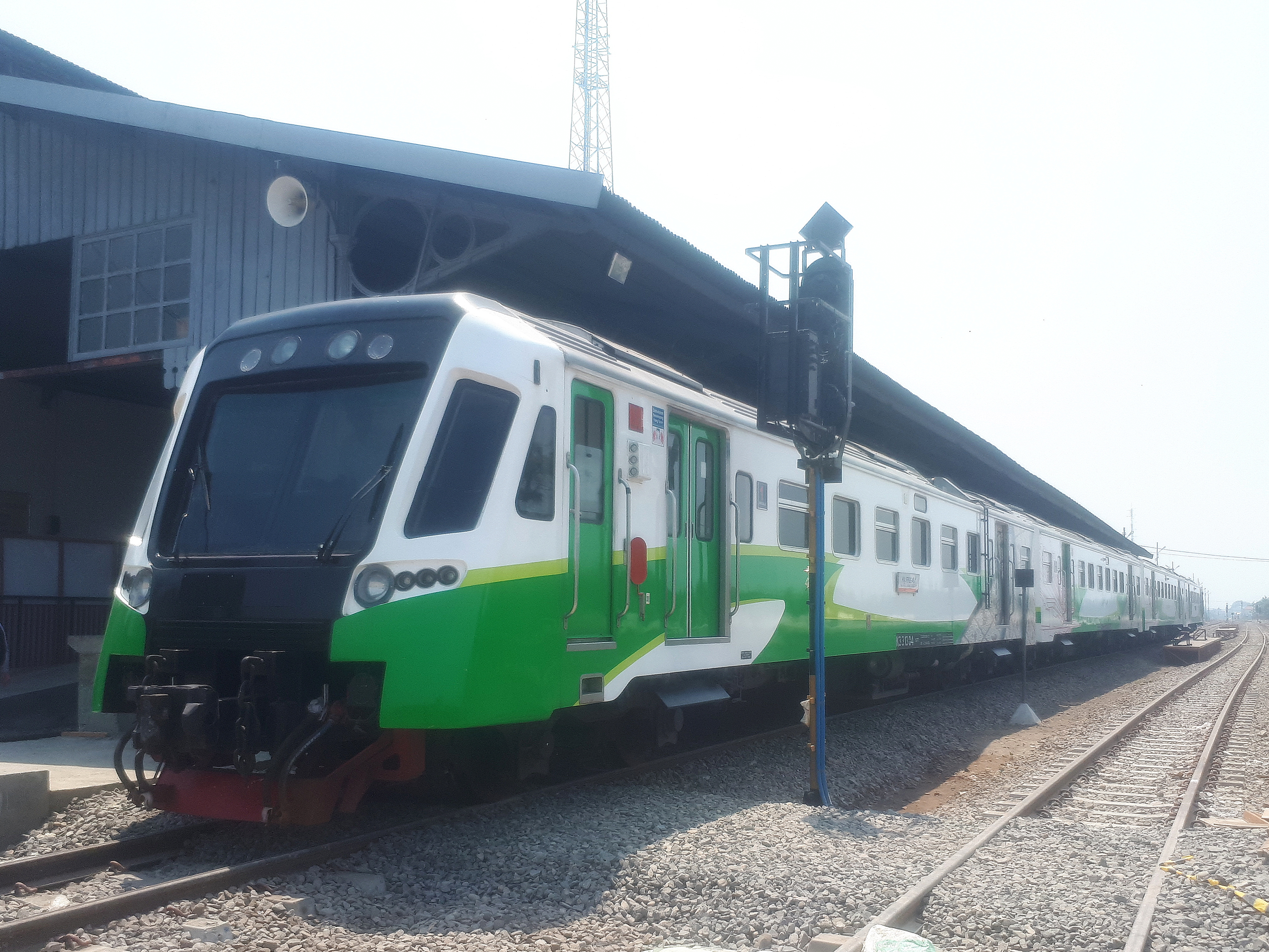
Commuter Line Jenggala trainset in Mojokerto Station.

== See also ==
- Rail transport in Indonesia
- KAI Commuter
