= Bangil railway station =

Railway station in Indonesia

Bangil railway station Stasiun Bangil
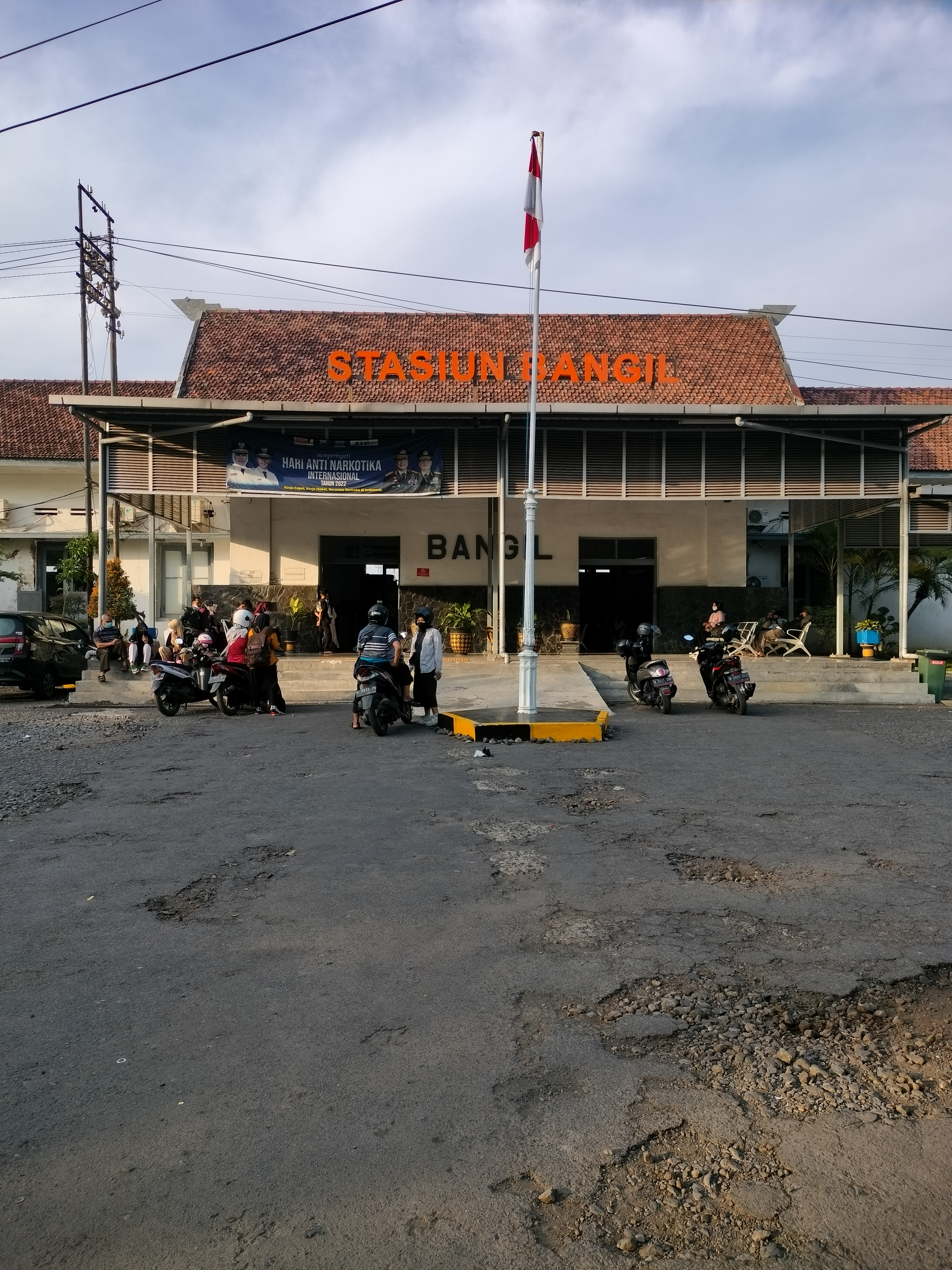
- Front view of Bangil railway station also as main building

General information
- Location: Pogar, Bangil, Pasuruan Regency; East Java; Indonesia
- Coordinates: 7°35′56″S 112°46′42″E
- Elevation: +9 m (30 ft)
- Owner: Kereta Api Indonesia
- Operator: Kereta Api Indonesia
- Line: Surabaya–Bangil-Pasuruan
- Platforms: 1 side platform 2 Island platforms
- Tracks: 8

Construction
- Structure type: Ground
- Parking: Available
- Accessible: Available

Other information
- Station code: BG

History
- Opened: 16 May 1878; 148 years ago
- Rebuilt: around 1948―1950

Services
Preceding station		Following station
Porong towards Surabaya Kota	Commuter Line Supas SB-PS	Pasuruan towards Pasuruan or Probolinggo
Porong towards Surabaya Kota	Commuter Line Supas SB-PB	Pasuruan towards Pasuruan or Probolinggo
Lawang One-way operation	Commuter Line Dhoho SB-SB East Java Circular Line (counter-clockwise)	Porong towards
Lawang One-way operation	Commuter Line Dhoho BL-SB East Java Circular Line (counter-clockwise)	Porong towards
Lawang One-way operation	Commuter Line Dhoho East Java Circular Line (counter-clockwise)	Porong towards Surabaya Kota
Porong One-way operation	Commuter Line Penataran SB-SB East Java Circular Line (clockwise)	Lawang towards
Porong One-way operation	Commuter Line Penataran East Java Circular Line (clockwise)	Lawang towards Malang, Blitar, Kertosono or Surabaya Kota
Porong One-way operation	Commuter Line Penataran SB-BL East Java Circular Line (clockwise)	Lawang towards
Location
- Location within Java

Bangil Station (BG) is a class I (one) railway station located in Pogar, Bangil, Pasuruan Regency; entered within eastern border of Operational Area VII Surabaya of Kereta Api Indonesia (KAI) at the height of ± 9 meters above sea level (railway line Surabaya-Bangil). To the east of this station, there are branches towards Pasuruan-Probolinggo-Jember-Banyuwangi and to Malang.

To the west of this station, before entering Porong there is Gununggangsir which is deactivated due to low income. Bangil is the main railway station in the west of Pasuruan Regency, so this is one of the most busiest station in East Java that most of the trains stop at here.

== History ==
Bangil railway station was commissioned by Staatsspoorwegen Oosterlijnen (East Line) as a state railway company in Dutch East Indies on May 16, 1878, at the same time as the commissioning of Surabaya - Sidoarjo -Bangil - Pasuruan railway line which was among the first railway line construction. Bangil is classified as a huge station, it has an engine shed. Just after the Staatsspoorwegen (SS) commissioned Surabaya−Pasuruan line, the company continued to build a new line to Malang which was commissioned on July 20, 1879.

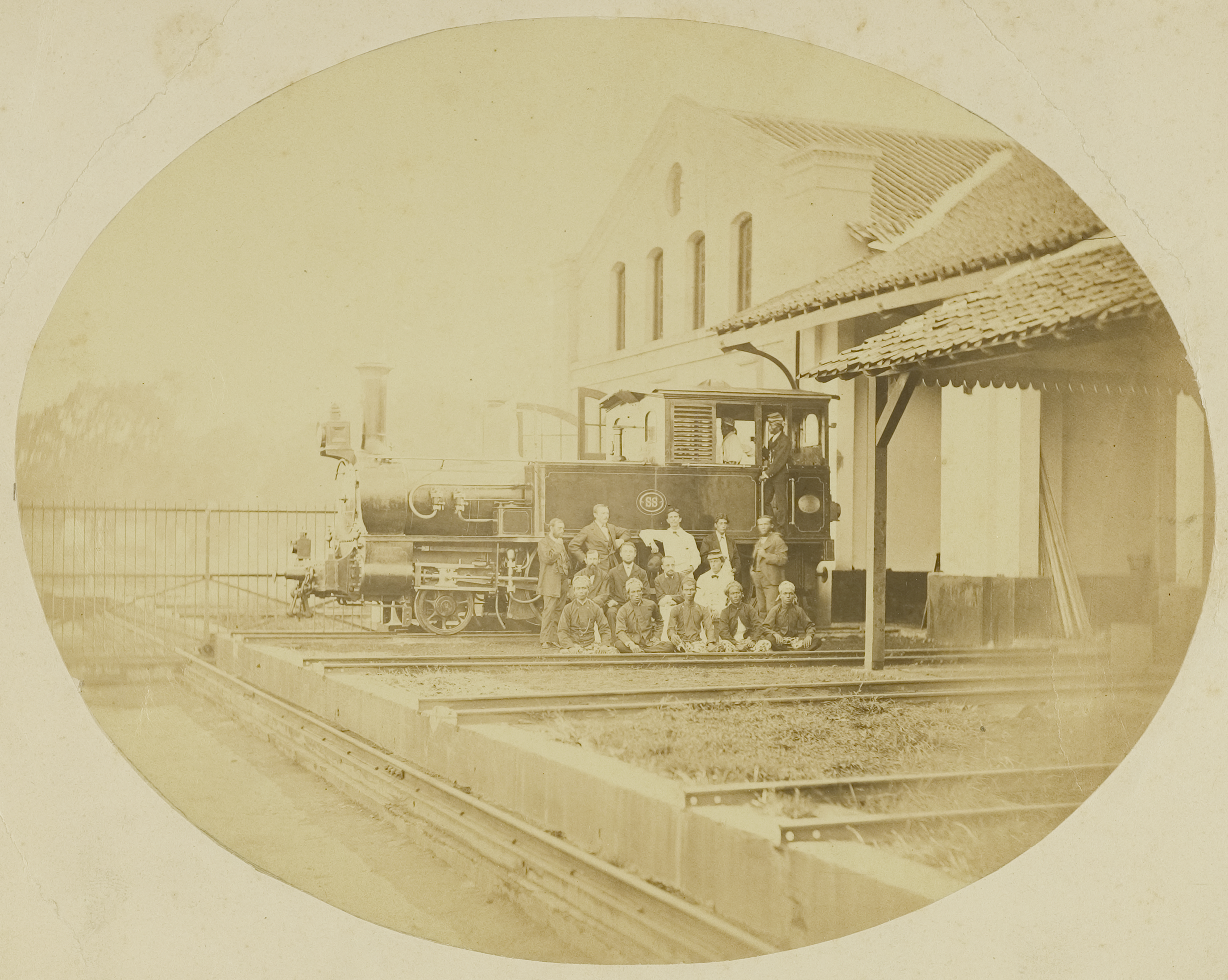
One of the first fleet of Staatsspoorwegen flat-track steam engine manufactured by Fox, Walker & Co. for Surabaya-Bangil line

Malang is a cold mountainous area in the south, where its geographical condition, apart from plantation area, is also a city that is suitable for weekend getaway destinations for city residents, most travelers went to Batu area. The railway line to Malang is incline passing several plantations and mountain ranges. The line begins to encounter steep incline in the area of Sengon. So, at the beginning of the operation, the SS didn't have large and powerful locomotives yet to accommodate trains passing through the mountainous route of Malang. So an engine shed was established to accommodate train trips from urban areas. Initially, the shed was a stopover for small steam locomotives (flat and mountainous-tracks) from Fox, Walker & Co., England as well as several locomotives from Sächsische Maschinenfabrik (Hartmann), Germany just like 2-6-0T SS300 and SS400 classes (DKA/PNKA C11 and C12). Over time, the shed became a stopover for larger and more powerful locomotives, such as the mallet locomotive 2-6-6-0T SS520 classes (DKA CC10s), ex-Preanger (West Java) mountain locomotives 2-12-2T SS800 classes (DKA F10) also known as "Javanic" and the express steam engines 4-6-4T SS1100 and SS1300 classes (DKA C27 and C28) to serve the express train from Surabaya to Malang named Vlugge Vijf (The Fast Five) which at the first operational had five round trips serving passengers from Surabaya to Malang. The Vlugge Vijf had ever booked a record just only 75 minutes from Surabaya to Malang because the line from Surabaya to Porong was linked by double-track line (later was shut down to only single track during Japanese occupation in World War II, transported for railway construction in Burma or another region). This station also served both as a stop and double heading for the express train to tackled the steep line to Malang, while the line of Surabaya–Malang could be driven by trains up to 90 km/hour in the late 1930s. At the eve of 70s was the edge of steam ages, the PJKA or Perusahaan Jawatan Kereta Api at the time slowly replaced their old steam engines with the newer diesels. Meanwhile, the fate of the steams had been scrapped or become static exhibits. The last occupants of the shed which ever documented in late 1970 to 80s were Georg Krauß C21s which was belonged to Mojokerto Steam Tramway (MdjSM), Hartmann C1136 (ex-SS336), the Werkspoor DKA C5317 (ex-SS1017), the Hohenzollern Locomotive Works D11s ex-Malang Steam Tramway, Hanomag "Javanic" DKA F1007 (ex-SS807) and DKA C2843 (ex-SS1343).

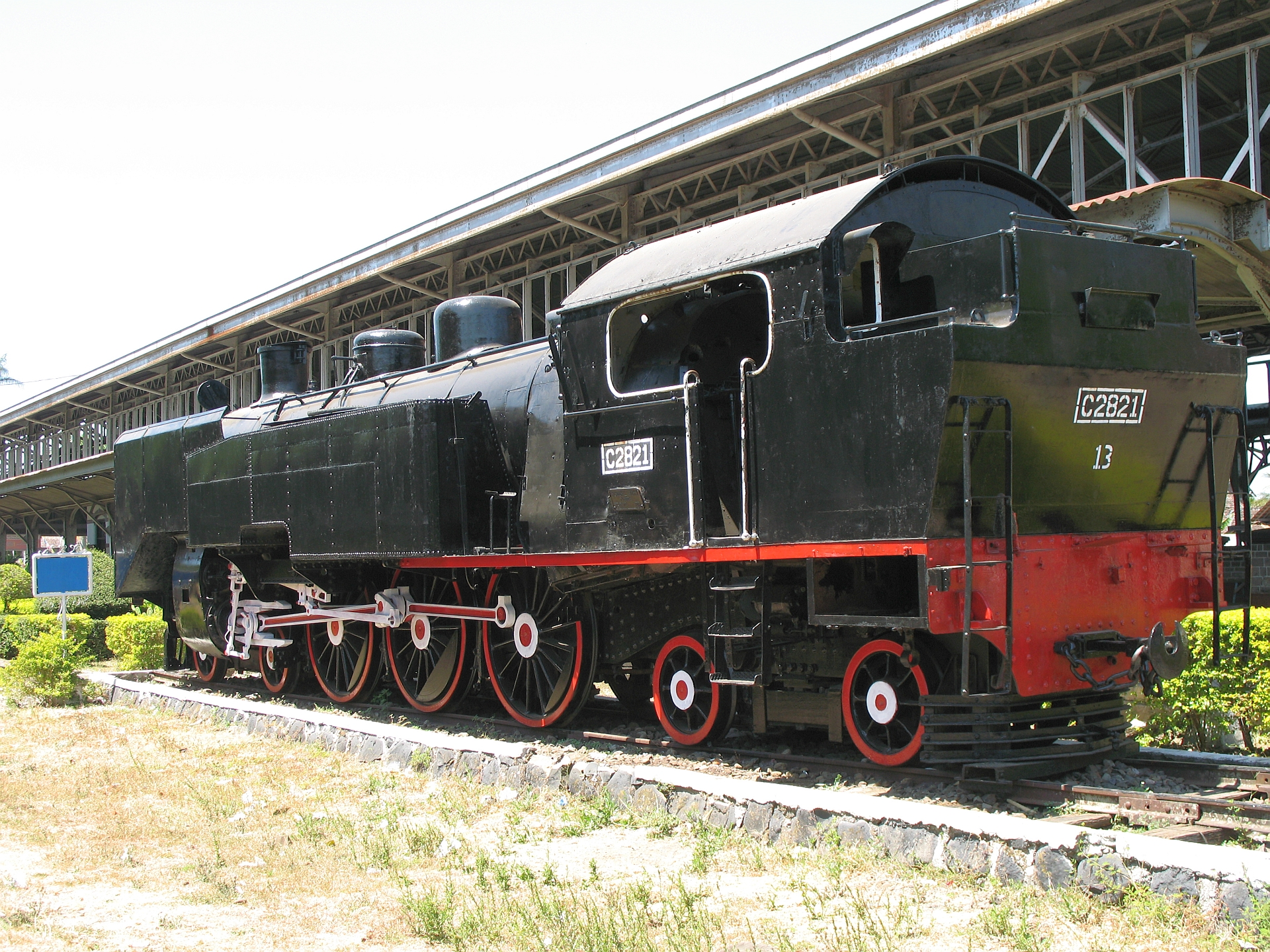
The last surviving "the express" SS1300 class locomotive, the ex-SS1321 (become C2821) with smoke deflector at the front of its water tank, preserved at Ambarawa Railway Museum

This station has the same facade and design as Kertosono that includes the main building, canopy and the emplacement. The main building of the station had been rebuilt, except for the platform canopy and a turntable also locomotive depot that both of them are not used today. In some records, the original main building was bombed and destroyed during 2nd Dutch Military Aggression against the Republic of Indonesia, (see Operation Kraai) in 1948. After the battle, the DKA-RI (the Department of Railways of the Republic of Indonesia) rebuilt the main building of the station at the following year.

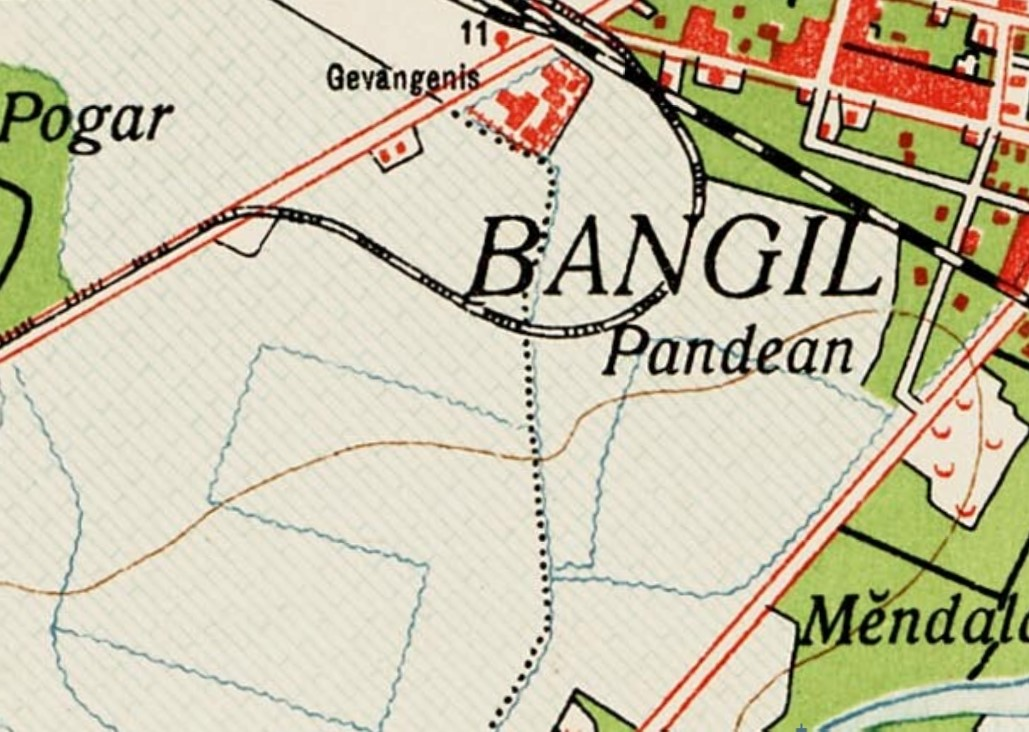
This was a 1912 map image of the first Modjokerto Steam Tramway's line to Pandaan (Pandakan) which was inaugurated in September 1899 before being shifted to the south of Bangil station in 1919.

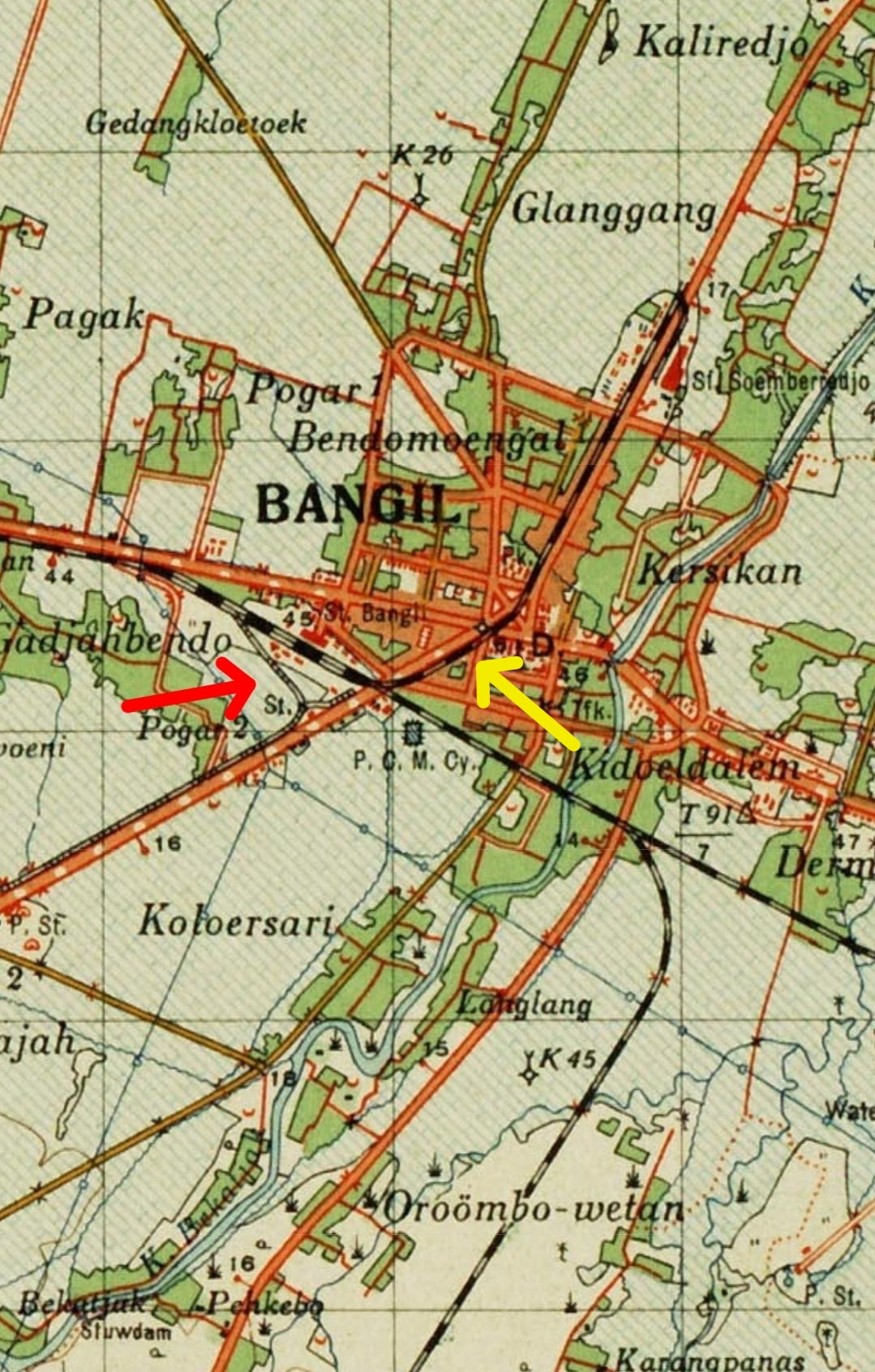
A map issued in 1937 shows new tram line of Modjokerto Steam Tramway to Pandaan (red arrow) established in 1919, the State Railway line to Sumberredjo sugar mill (yellow arrow)

To the south of the station, behind an abandoned locomotive depot there was branch connected to Pandaan and Japanan operated by a private tramway company named Modjokerto Stoomtram Maatschappij (MdjSM) or Mojokerto Steam Tramway as for Bangil-Japanan-Mojokerto rail line which opened on May 4, 1919. The line itself was used for the freight route and along this line, there were Panda'an (Ardiredjo) and Japanan sugar mills. Actually, this line was a displacement railway line for MdjSM from the first line which was inaugurated on September 18, 1899. The first MdjSM line used this station from track no.1 to the east (to Pasuruan) and then curved to the south passing behind the prison. Then, around 1914 Staatsspoorwegen (SS) proposed a line construction using the actual Modjokerto tramway's line map to the north (Kaliredjo) which connected to Sumberredjo sugar mill as a freight route service and this also impacted the operation of MdjSM's asset with the move of their railway line. The move of MdjSM railway line to the south because the line to Sumberredjo was actually belonged to MdjSM as part of Panda'an-Bangil line based on Colonial Government's Decree No.1 on 31 of December 1895. After line to Panda'an finished and opened in 1899, the MdjSM didn't execute the line construction to the north (Kaliredjo) which connected to the sugar mill and they considered it less profitable for their business operations. Finally, this line was taken over by State Railway or Staatsspoorwegen to build it which started from track number one from this station connected to Sumberredjo passing Bangil town square (just north from the station) around 1914-16 and finished in 1919.

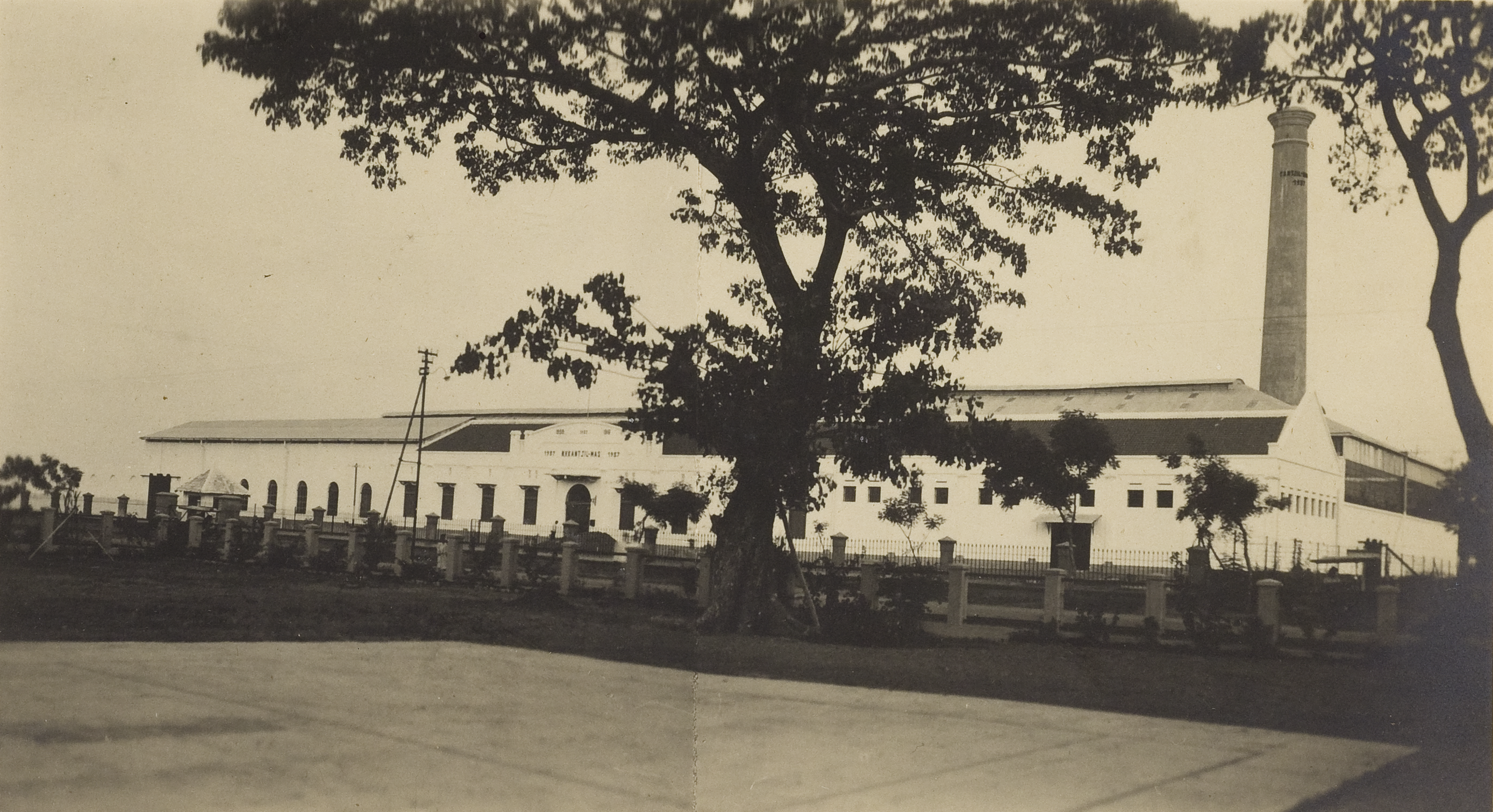
Kantjil Mas Textile Factory (ex-Sumberredjo sugar mill) established in 1937

After MdjSM moved their line to the south, they also built their own station (Bangil MdjSM) not far from Bangil station in the south which now become a resident house, just behind Bangil locomotive depot. The sugar mill itself was defunct around 1932/1933 followed by Pandaan and Japanan as the result of Great Depression, then Sumberredjo was re-acquired by NV. Textielfabriek en Handelsmaatschappij "Kantjil Mas" and changed to a textile industry named "Kantjil Mas" in 1937. During Independence War (1947-1949), Bangil-Japanan railway line was damaged so it couldn't be used so after the war the DKA (Djawatan Kereta Api) Building Service was forced to renovate this rail line around 1949-1950 so that these lines could be operated again. Finally, this line was deactivated in 1969 as a result of a mismatched with the urban planning of Mojokerto at the time, while the line to Kantjil Mas or called Kancil Mas today was deactivated around the 1980s.

== Building Layout ==
Bangil railway station has 8 active tracks with two additional tracks to the warehouse located in southwest of the station. Track no.2 is straight-track to and from the east line (Jember–Ketapang (Banyuwangi)), while the track no.3 is straight-track to the south line (Malang – Blitar – Kertosono) and Surabaya is from the west. In addition, track no.6 to no.8 are used as loops to store fuel-tank wagons or another cars.

As of from May 2010, the station's signaling system has been replaced with an electrical signaling system based on Programmable Logic Controller (PLC) made by Len Industri, namely the 2nd generation Len Interlocking System (SIL-02).

== Services ==
The following list of trains that are stopped at this station :

=== Passenger Train ===
==== Intercity ====
Railway Line	Train Name	Class	Destination	Description
Northern Java Line	Blambangan Express	Executive and Premium Economy	Ketapang (Banyuwangi)	Via Surabaya Pasar Turi
Northern Java Line	Blambangan Express	Executive and Premium Economy	Jakarta Pasar Senen	Via Surabaya Pasar Turi
Northern Java Line	Jayabaya	Executive and Premium Economy	Malang	Via Surabaya Pasar Turi and Semarang Poncol
Northern Java Line	Jayabaya	Executive and Premium Economy	Jakarta Pasar Senen	Via Surabaya Pasar Turi and Semarang Poncol
Northern Java Line	Pandalungan	Executive	Jakarta Gambir	via Surabaya Gubeng–Surabaya Pasar Turi–Semarang Tawang
Northern Java Line	Pandalungan	Executive	Jember	via Surabaya Gubeng–Surabaya Pasar Turi–Semarang Tawang
Central Java Line	Arjuno Express	Executive	Surabaya Gubeng	(Facultative schedule). Train no.83F (to Malang) and no.84F (to Surabaya). Operates on Saturday and Sunday (weekend).
Central Java Line	Arjuno Express	Executive	Malang	(Facultative schedule). Train no.83F (to Malang) and no.84F (to Surabaya). Operates on Saturday and Sunday (weekend).
Southern Java Line	Ranggajati	Executive and Premium Economy	Cirebon	-
Southern Java Line	Ranggajati	Executive and Premium Economy	Jember	-
Southern Java Line	Wijayakusuma	Executive and Premium Economy	Cilacap	-
Southern Java Line	Wijayakusuma	Executive and Premium Economy	Banyuwangi	-
Southern Java Line	Mutiara Timur	Executive and Premium Economy	Yogyakarta	No schedule for this moment
Southern Java Line	Mutiara Timur	Executive and Premium Economy	Banyuwangi	No schedule for this moment
Southern Java Line	Logawa	Business and Economy	Purwokerto	-
Southern Java Line	Logawa	Business and Economy	Jember	-
Southern Java Line	Sri Tanjung	Economy	Lempuyangan	-
Southern Java Line	Sri Tanjung	Economy	Banyuwangi	-
Eastern Java Line	Probowangi	Economy	Surabaya Gubeng	-
Eastern Java Line	Probowangi	Economy	Banyuwangi	-
Eastern Java Line	Tawang Alun	Economy	Malang Kotalama	-
Eastern Java Line	Tawang Alun	Economy	Banyuwangi	-

==== Commuter / Local ====
Name of the train	Destination	Description
Penataran	Surabaya (Surabaya Gubeng or Surabaya Kota)	Via Malang
Penataran	Blitar	Via Malang
Tumapel	Surabaya Kota	-
Tumapel	Malang	-
Commuter Surabaya−Pasuruan (SuPas)	Surabaya Kota	-
Commuter Surabaya−Pasuruan (SuPas)	Pasuruan	-

=== Freight Train ===
Pertamina Tanker, to Benteng and Malang Kotalama

== Gallery ==
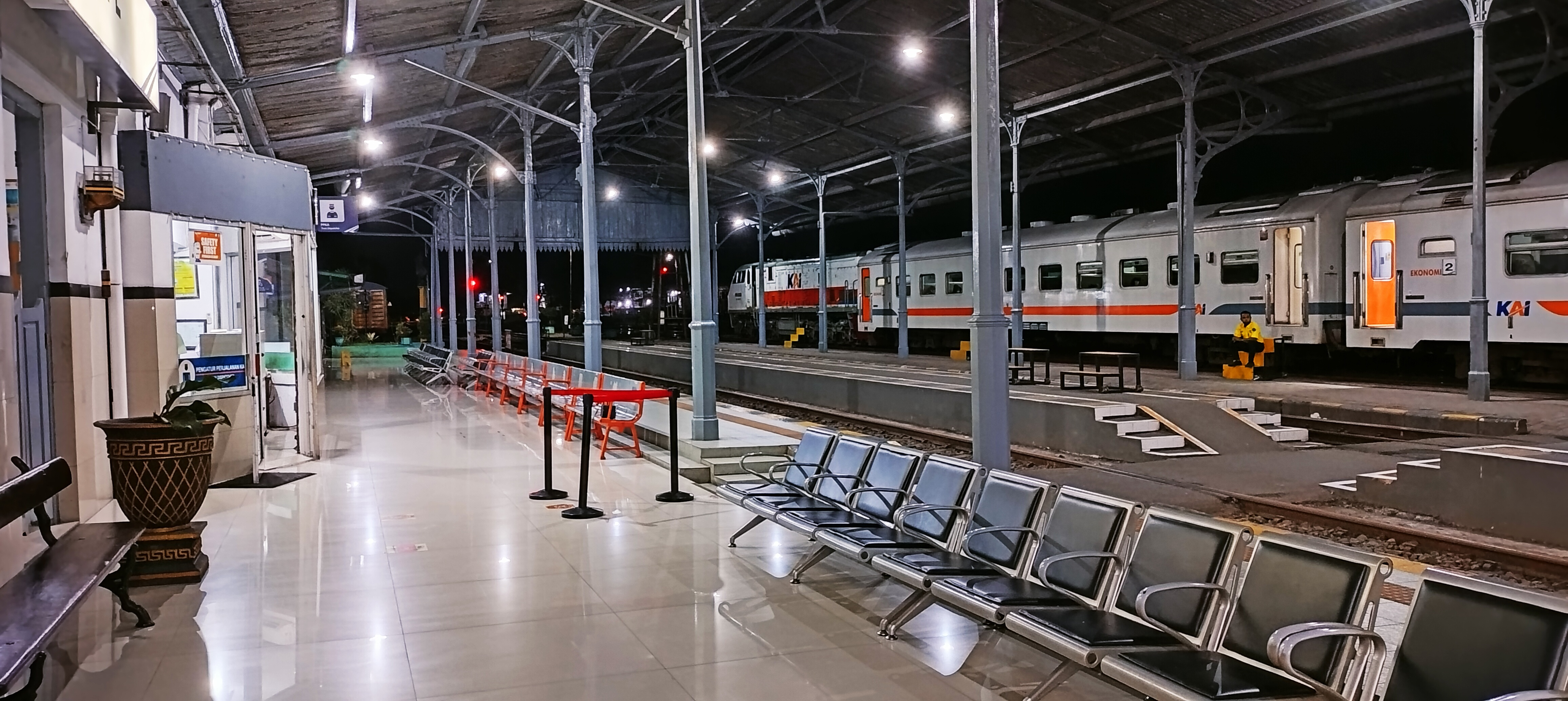
Bangil stations platform to the east (Pasuruan/Malang) at night

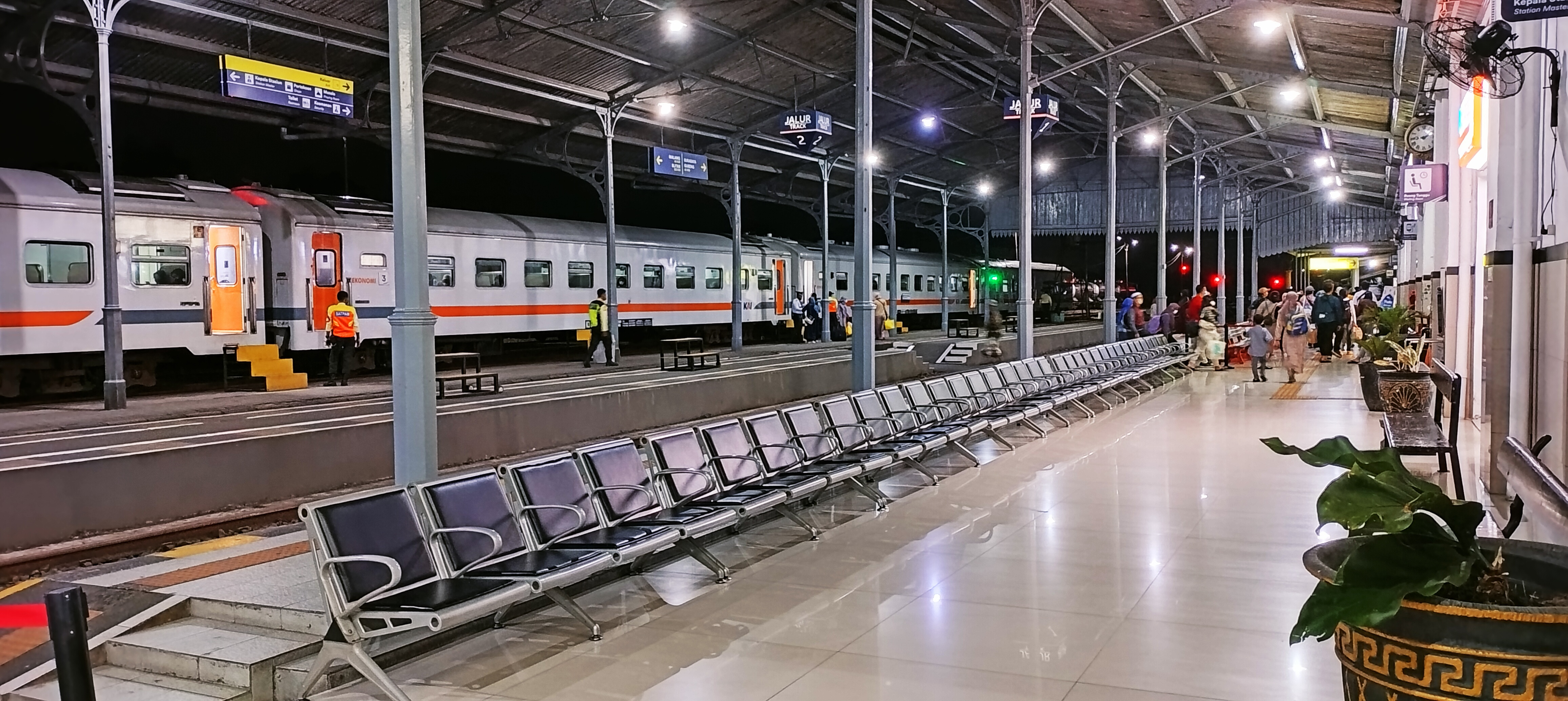
Bangil stations platform to the west (Surabaya) at night

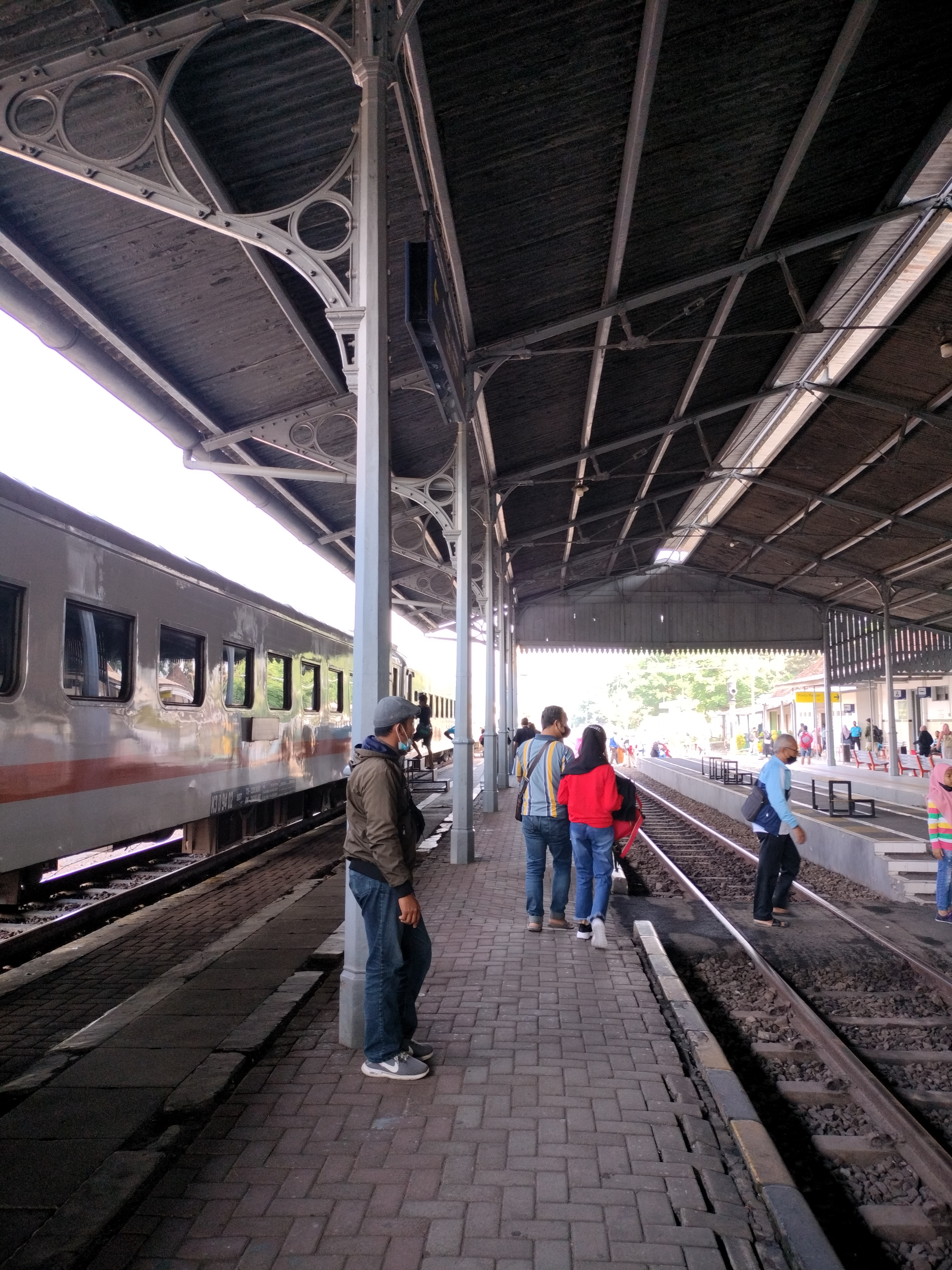
Island platform's view from third track of Bangil station. Also showed, a local train named Penataran from Blitar-Malang to Surabaya.

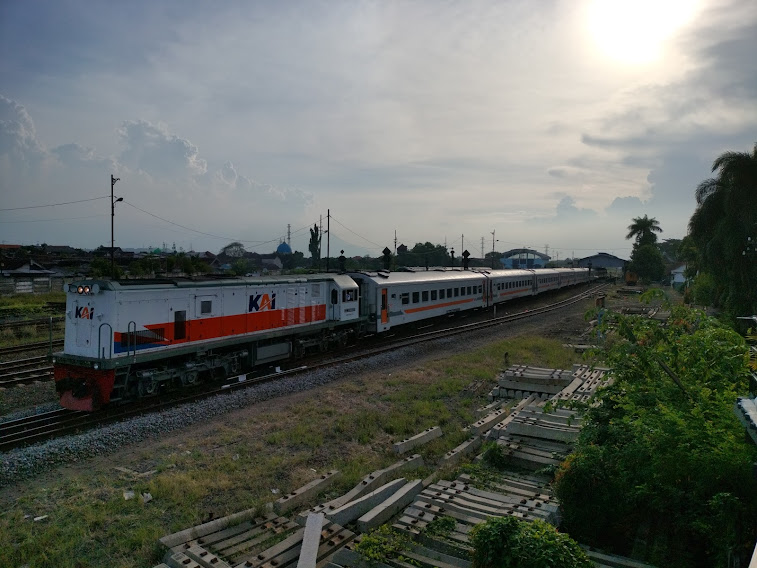
The SuPas (Surabaya-Pasuruan) commuter train in passenger coach-locomotive arrangement at Bangil prepared to depart for Pasuruan

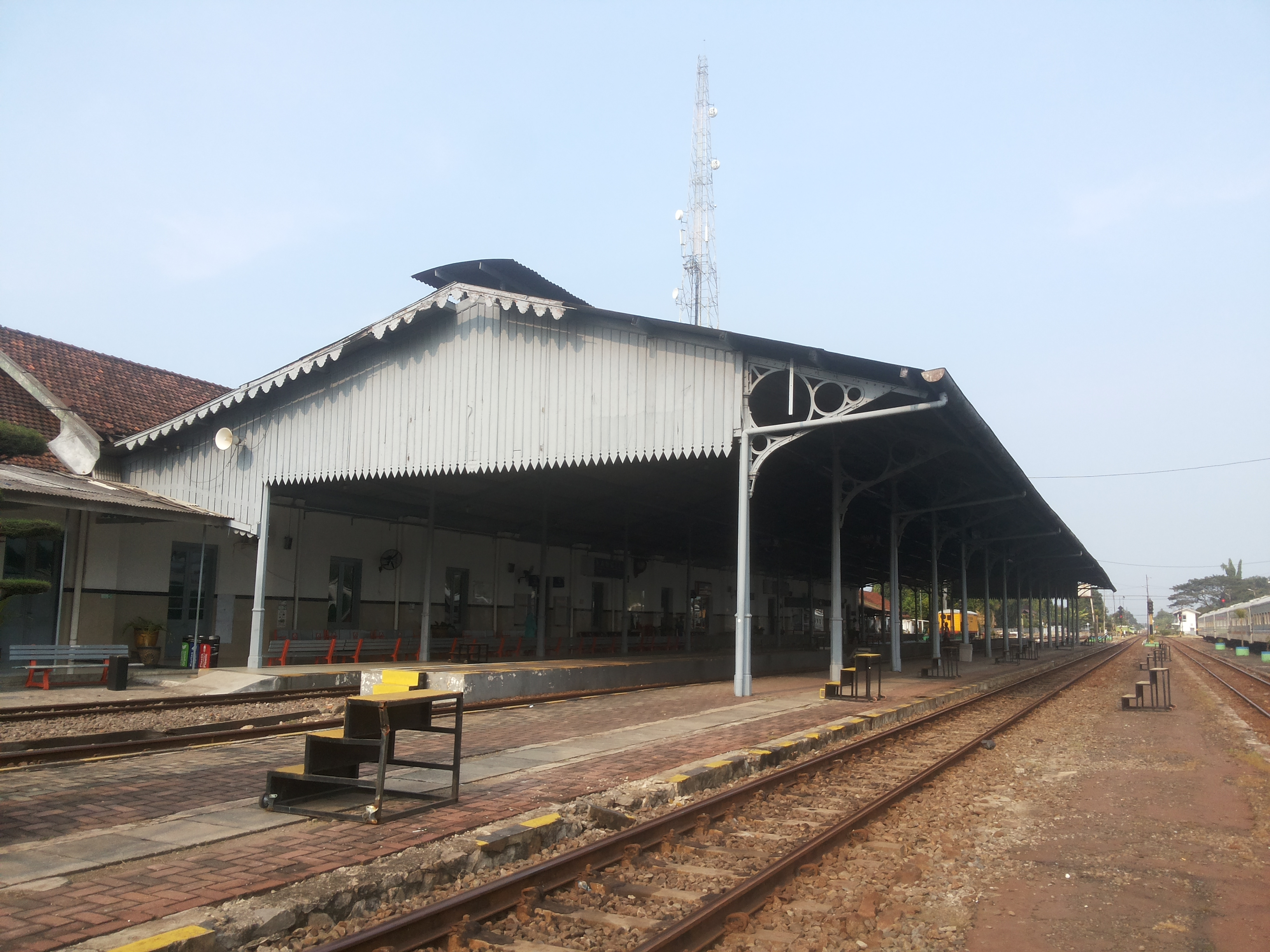
Bangil train station from west (Surabaya), showing its platforms, canopy, main building and some tracks.

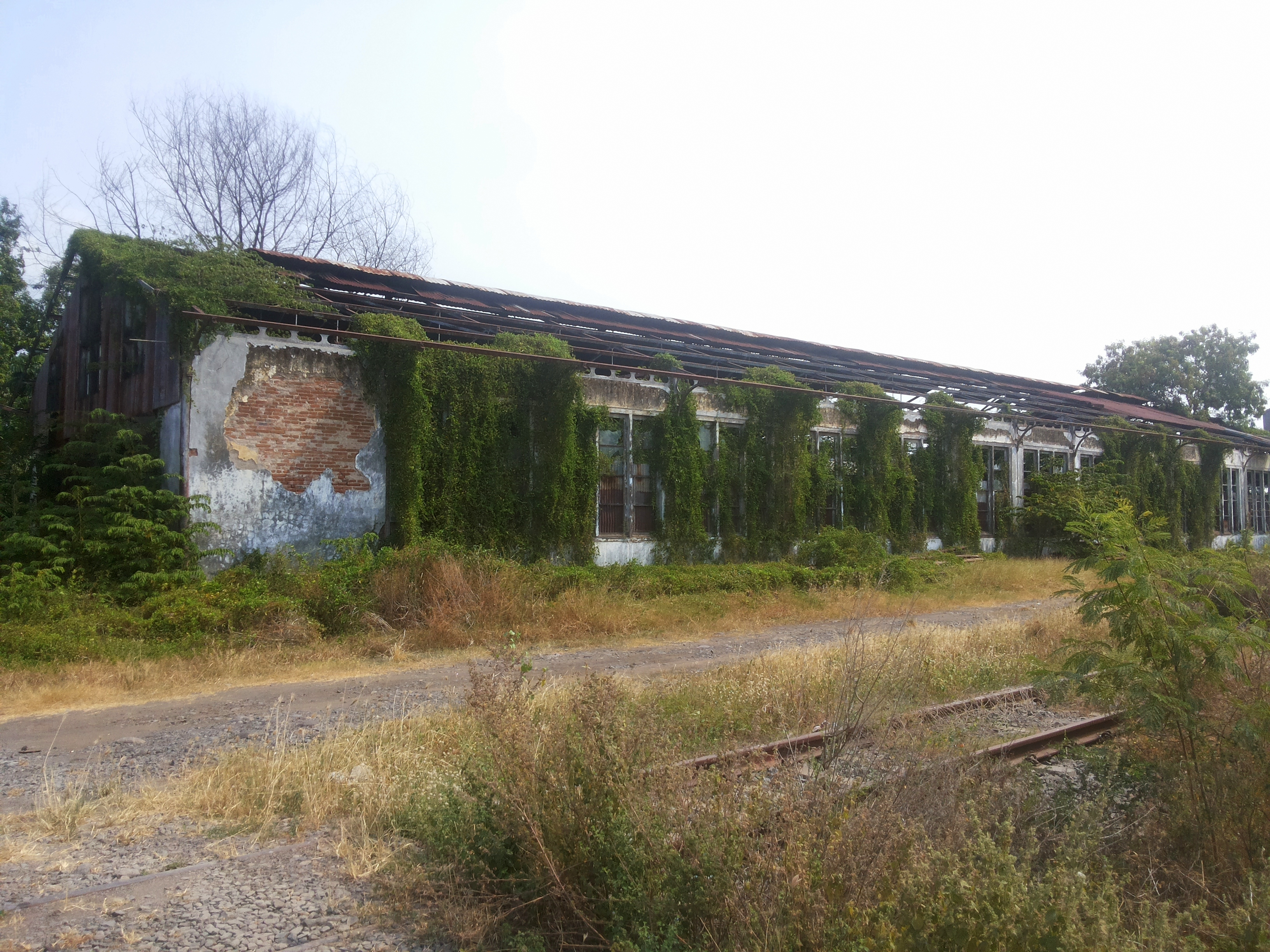
Bangil shed which isn't used today

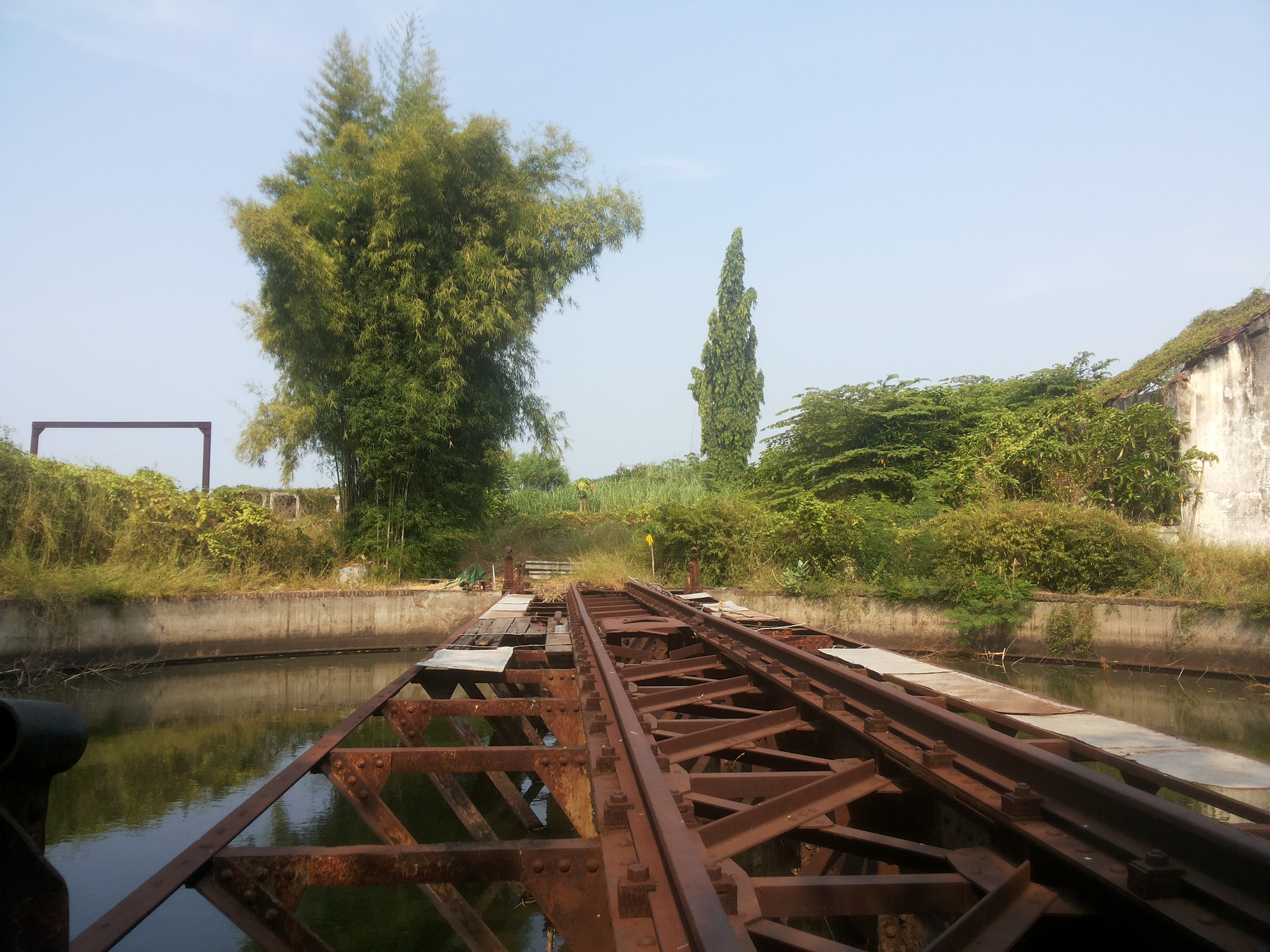
Bangil locomotive turntable that isn't used today (not far from the shed)

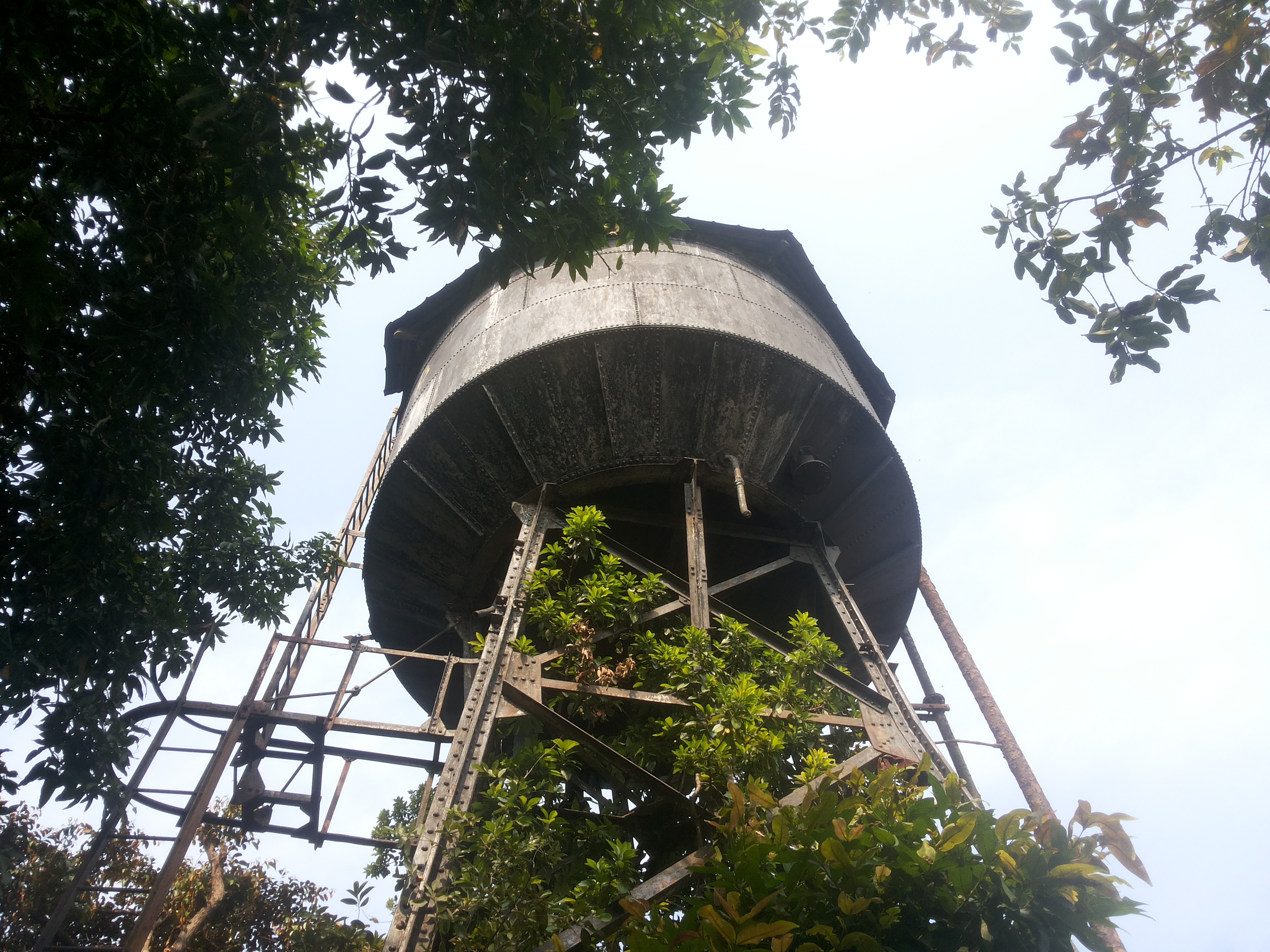
Watertower of Bangil station which is close to ex-Bangil MdjSM (Modjokerto Steam Tram) station.

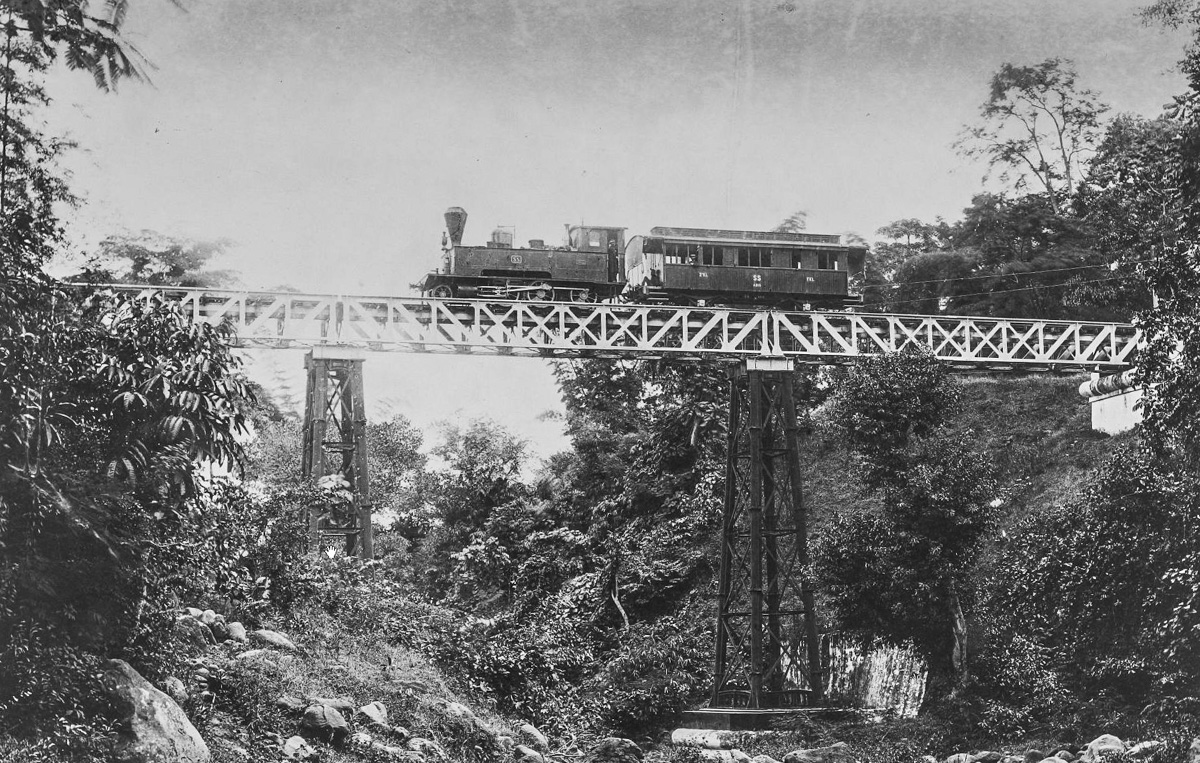
A photo shows a 2-6-0T SS300 class steam engine (later type C11) hauled an SS inspection car passing a bridge on the Bangil-Malang railway line

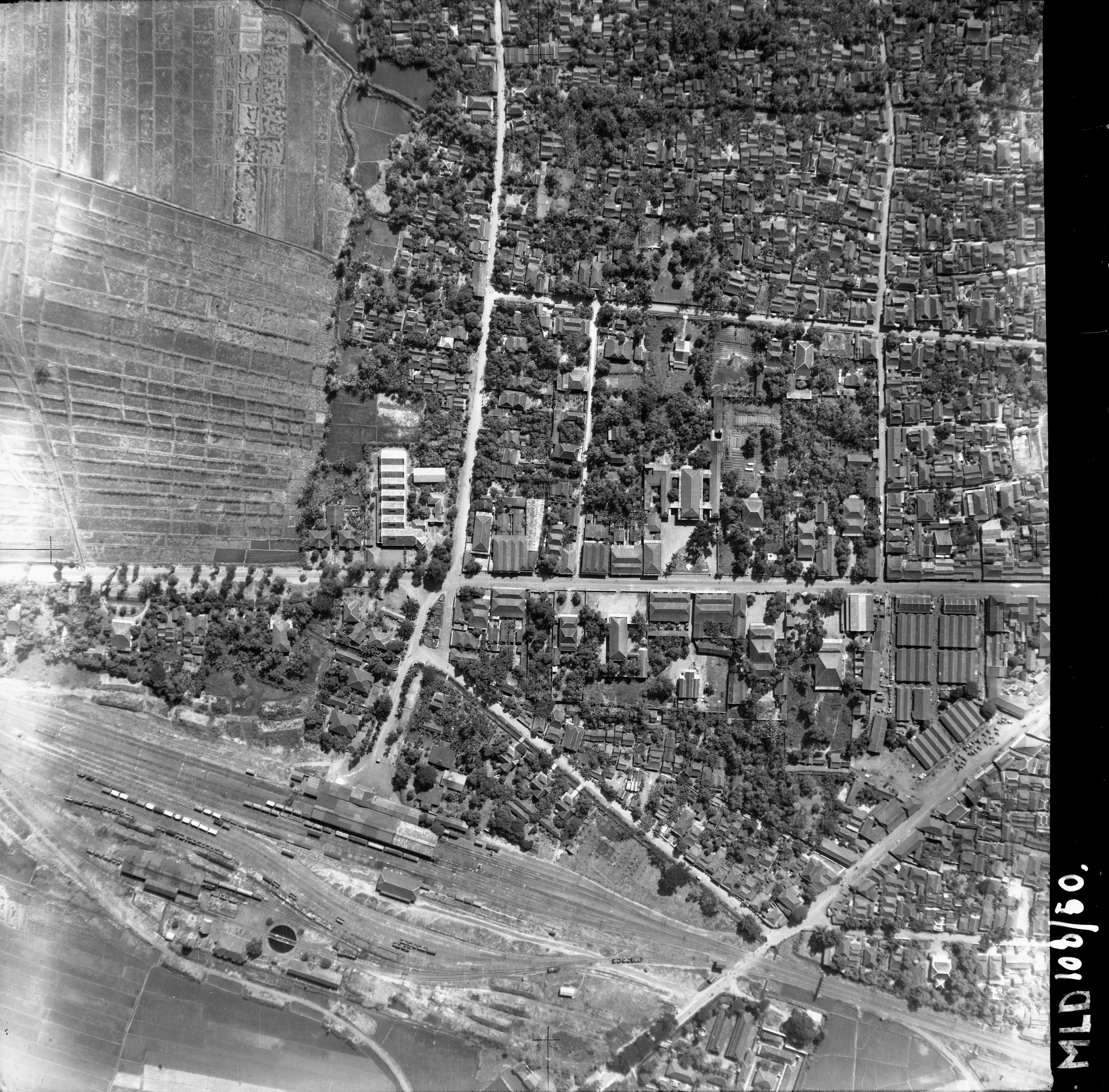
An aerial photo of Bangil and Melaten roads in 1947, also shows Bangil railway station (bottom) before being rebuilt with its warehouse, loops, siding to the locomotive depot, turntable and line to "Kantjil Mas" (Kancil Mas) Textile Factory (ex-Sumber Redjo sugar mill) then a branch line of Modjokerto Steam Tram Co. to Pandaan-Japanan (bottom middle-left).
