= List of bus operator companies in Indonesia =

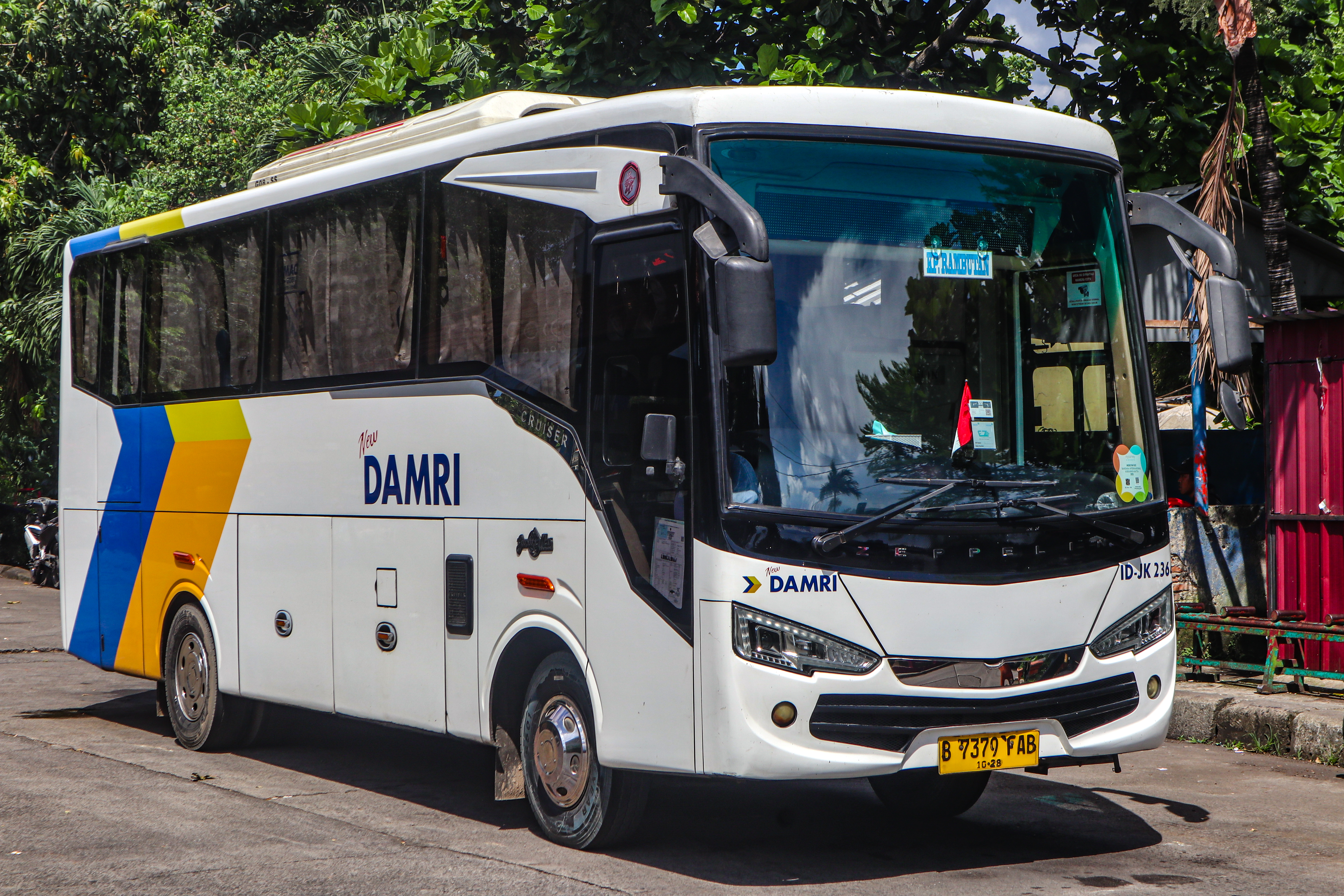
Perum DAMRI is a state companies bus operator in Indonesia, it serves connecting Inter-city, City bus, and also Cross-border bus line

This is a list of bus companies in Indonesia. In Indonesia, long-distance buses are categorized into 2 types, namely "intercity bus within the province" (Indonesian: Antarkota Dalam Provinsi or AKDP) and "intercity interprovince bus" (Antarkota Antarprovinsi or AKAP).

== Transportation within the route ==
=== Inter-city buses ===
In Indonesia, intercity buses are classified into three types: interstate buses (crossing national borders), intercity interprovincial buses (AKAP), and intercity buses within provinces (AKDP).

==== Cross-border bus lines ====
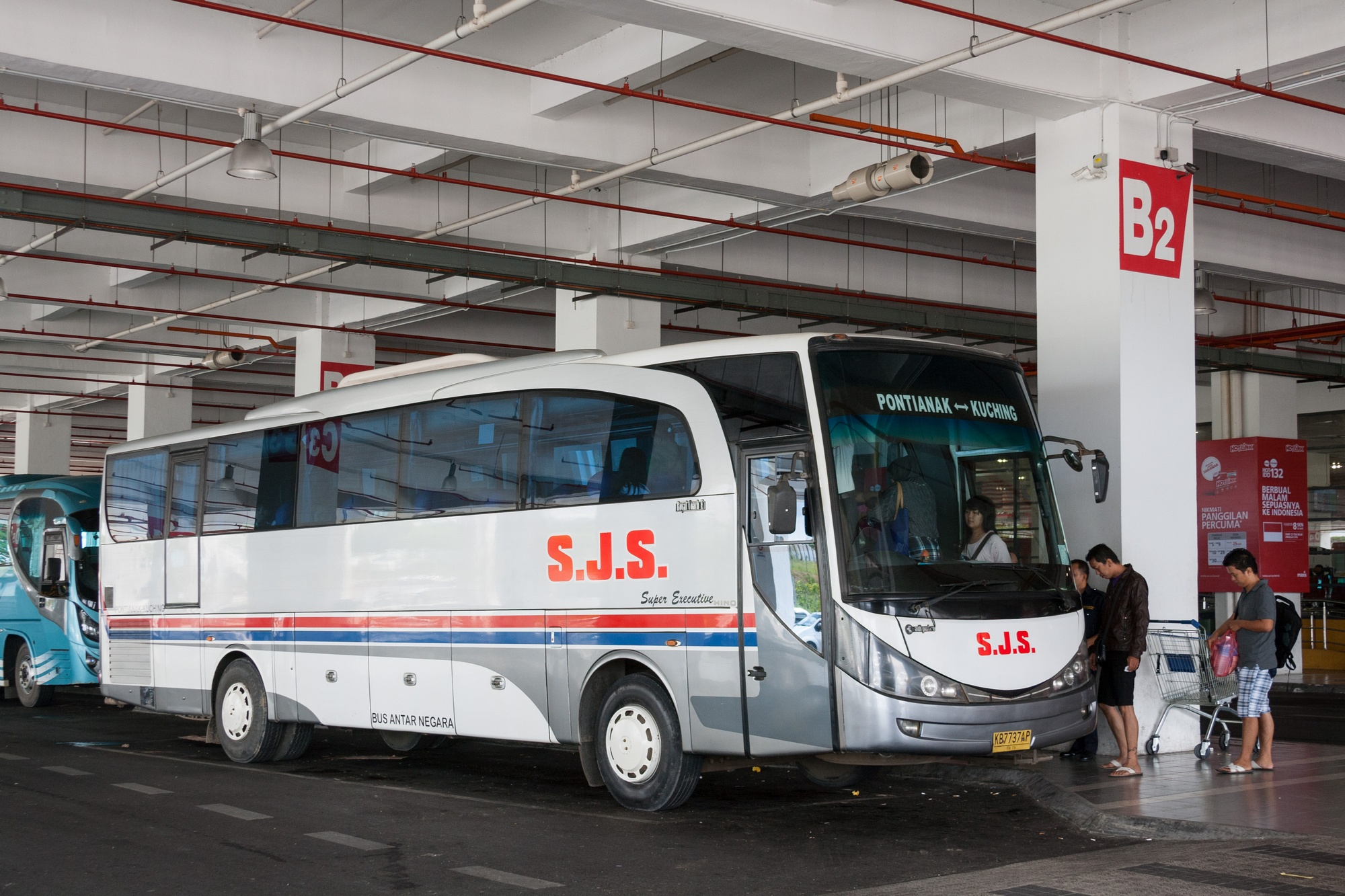
International bus Setia Jiwana Sakti serving the route Pontianak–Kuching

- Bagong (Kupang, Indonesia – Dili, Timor Leste)
- Perum DAMRI
  - Pontianak, West Kalimantan, Indonesia – Kuching, Sarawak, Malaysia – Bandar Seri Begawan, Brunei
  - Kupang, East Nusa Tenggara, Indonesia – Dili, Timor Leste
  - Jayapura, Papua, Indonesia – Vanimo, Papua New Guinea
- Setia Jiwana Sakti (Pontianak, West Kalimantan, Indonesia – Kuching, Sarawak, Malaysia – Bandar Seri Begawan, Brunei)

==== Intercity, interprovincial, and intercity within a province ====
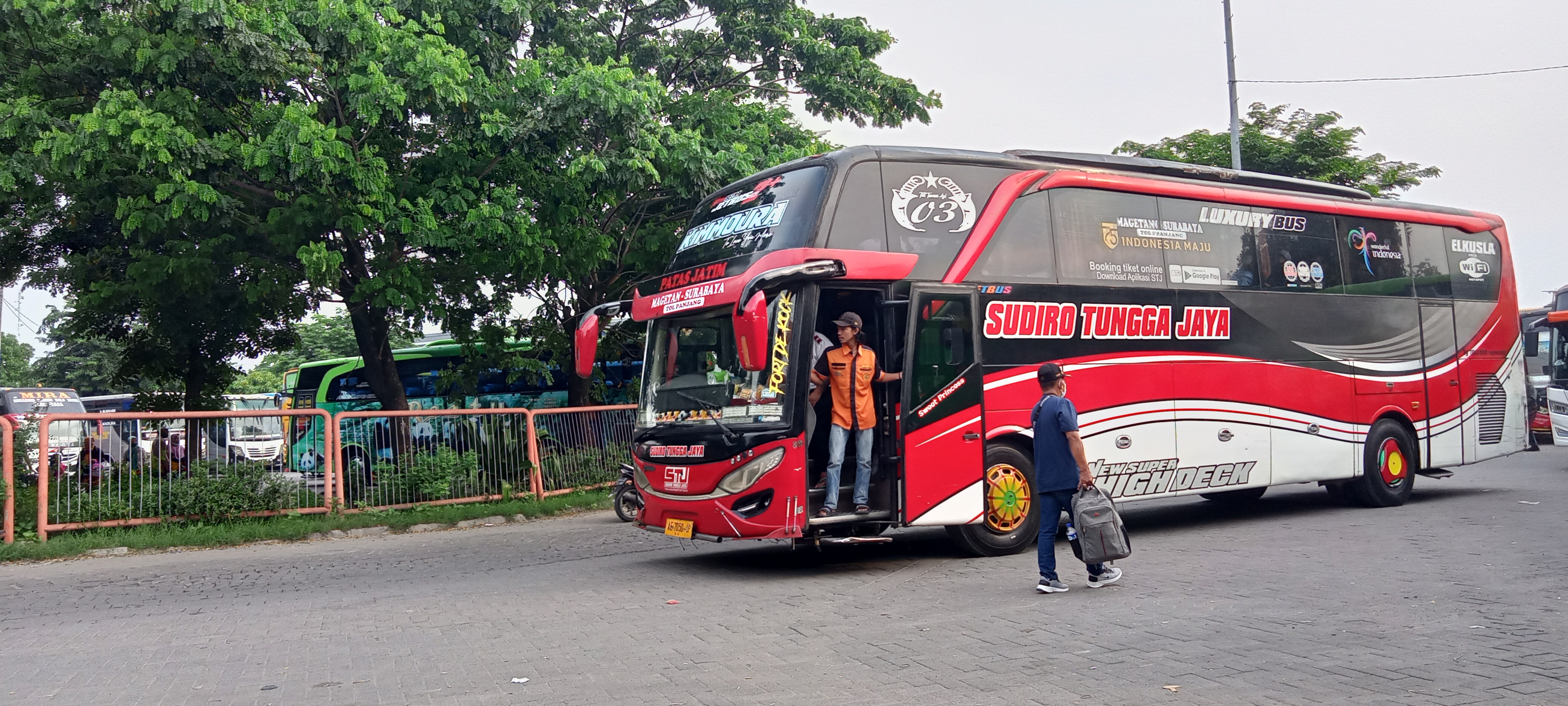
Sudiro Tungga Jaya as limited-express intercity within East Java province at Surabaya–Magetan route, October 2022

The following is a list of bus companies in Indonesia that serve intercity routes:

- 168Trans
- 27Trans*
- ABG Bersholawat
- Adhi Prima
  - KencanaQu
- Adhi Putra
- Adibuzz
- Aerobus:
- Agam Tungga Jaya Group
  - Sudiro Tungga Jaya
  - Tunas Muda Transportation
- Agra Mas
- Agung Sejati
- Akas*
  - Akas Aurora Amanah (Akas AAA)
  - Akas Asri
  - Akas Green
  - Akas I
  - Akas IV
  - Akas N1
  - Akas NR
  - Anggun Krida
  - Harapan Kita
  - Indonesia Abadi
  - Mila Sejahtera
- Al Hijrah*
- Alendra
- Almira
- Almuna Trans
- ALS
  - Satu Nusa
- Aneka Jaya*
- ANG
- Angkasa Trans Jaya
- ANS
- Arimbi
  - Bima Suci
- Arya Prima
- Atlantic pm
- ATM Prima
- Bagong
  - MTrans
- Bali Kayana
- Bali Perdana
- Balisana
- Balideva Transport
- Bandung Express
- Barumun
- Barxolid Maxalmina
- Basuma Jaya
- Batang Pane Baru
- Batutumonga
- Bayu Mawla Putra
- Bejeu
- Bekasi Raya
- Berlian Blambangan
- Berlian Jaya
- BEsT Premium
- Bhisa*
- Bimasatya
- Bintan Jaya
- Bintang Asri
- Bintang Khatulistiwa
- Bintang Marwah
- Bintang Prima
- Bintang Selamat
- Bintang Selatan
- Bintang Timur
- Bintang Utara
- Bintang Utara Putra
- Bintang Zahira
- BKL Trans
- Borlindo
- Borneo Trans Mandiri
- Brata Yudhistira
- Brave Trans
- Budiman*
- Cahaya Bone
- Cahaya Solo
- Cahaya Trans
- ~~Cahaya Kembar Jaya~~
  - ~~Cahaya Kembar Gemilang~~
- Cahaya Ujung Pandang
- Charisma Transport
- Cititrans
- Coyo
- CSH 88
- Dahlia Indah
- DAMRI
- Dali Jaya Mandiri*
- Dali Mas
- Dali Prima
- Dedy Jaya
- Debe Trans
- Delima Sri Gemilang
- Dewi Sri
- Dharma Jaya Group
  - Puspa Sari
  - Restu Mulya
  - Wisata Komodo
- Diana Sejahtera
- Dieng Indah
- Dunia Mas
- Eco Indo
- Efisiensi
  - Tividi*
- Eka-Mira
- Elstar
- EPA Star
- Ezri
- Fajar Riau Wisata
- Family Raya Ceria
- Gajah Mulia Sejahtera
- Gajah Mungkur
- Gapuraning Rahayu
- Garuda Mas
- Gemilang Timur Transport
- Giri Indah
- Goodwill
- Gumarang Jaya
- Gumay Sakti
- Gunung Harta*
  - Gunung Harta Transport Solution*
- Gunung Mas NTT
- Gunung Mulia
- Handoyo
  - HD Trans
  - Indo Trans
  - ~~Mandala~~
- Harapan Baru
- Harapan Indah
- Harapan Jaya
- Harta Sanjaya
- Harum Prima
- Haryanto*
- Harvest
- Hiba Group
  - Asli Prima
  - Bayu Megah
  - Bela Utama
  - Hiba Putra
  - Hiba Prima
  - Kurnia Jaya
  - Laju Prima
  - Laju Utama
  - Murni Jaya
  - Pandu Jaya
  - Putri Jaya
  - Restu Jaya
  - Setia Negara
  - Wanaraja
- Intra
  - Eldivo
- INA Bus
- Jahe Raya
- Jambi Express Transport
- ~~Jasa Rahayu Gumpueng~~
- Jatra
- Jawa Indah Transindo
- Jaya Ponorogo
  - Jaya Kuning Abadi
  - Jaya Putih Reog
- Jaya Utama Indo
- Jember Indah
- Juragan 99 Trans*
- Kalebas
- Kalingga Jaya
- Kalisari
- Kapuas Raya Express
- Karona
- Kaswa
- Kemenangan Tjipto G.M
- Kemumai
- Ketty Trans
- Kharisma Wahyu Trans
- Khatulistiwa Trans
- Kosayu
- Kramat Djati
- Krui Putra
- Kupu Kupu Ayu
- Kurnia Anugerah Pusaka
- KYM Trans*
- Ladju
- Laksana Anda
- Laksmi (bus company)
  - Laksmi Langgeng
- Langsung Indah
- Langsung Jaya
- Langsung JB
- Lantra Jaya
- LBJ Transport
- Liman
- Limbersa*
- Litha & Co.
- Logos
- Lorena-Karina
- Luragung Group
  - Luragung Jaya
  - Luragung Termuda
  - Luragung Utama
  - Putra Luragung
  - Putri Luragung
- M Dewantara Ayu
- Madu Kismo
  - Zentrum-MK
- Mahardhika*
- ~~Mahendra Transport Indonesia~~
- Mahkota*
- Majoe Muda Mandiri
  - Antar Lintas Selatan
  - Bali Trans
  - Cendana
  - Madjoe
  - Neo Harapan Utama
  - Pacitan Indah
  - Ponorogo Indah
  - Purwodadi Permai
  - Putra Ponorogo
  - Sari Indah
  - Semarang Raya
  - Sumatera Raya Trans
- Maju Lancar
  - Citra Adi Lancar
- Maju Terus (Marus)
- Makmur-Halmahera
- Malang Indah
- Malino Putra
- Mandailing Antar Nusa
- Manggala Trans
- Mansion Trans
- Mario Merlin Jaya
- Matano Trans Nusa
- Mawar
- Mayasari Group
  - CBU-MGI
  - Doa Ibu
  - Karunia Bakti
  - Maya Gapura Intan
  - Primajasa
- Medal Sekarwangi
- Medali Mas
- Medan Jaya
- Mega Mas
- Mega Mustika
- Mekar Prima
- Meranti Etam
- Merdeka
- Metro Permai
- Metro Putra
- Miyor
- MPN
- Muji Jaya
- Mulyo
- Mulyo Indah
- Mutia Putri Mulia
- Mutiara Express
- NPM
- Narendra
- Neo Trans
- Nusa Bali
- Nusa Bhakti Trans
- Nusa Biru
- Nusa Jaya Indofast
- Nusantara
- Ohana
- Padaidi
- Pahala Kencana
- Paimaham
- Palala
- Pandawa 87*
- Pangeran Aman Sukses
- Paradise Indah
- Pares Indah Team
- Parikesit
- Pebepe
- Pelita Mas
- Pelita Paradep
- Perama
- Perintis
- Piposs
- PMH
- PMS
- PMTOH
- Pontiac Prima Jaya
- Pratama Putra NTT
- Primadona
- Primajaya
- Puspa Jaya
- Putera Bangka
- ~~Putera Mulya~~
- Putra Inhil
- Putra Jaya Sulawesi
- Putra Pandawa Karya
- Putra Pelangi
- Putra Pelangi
- Putra Rafflesia
- Putra Remaja
- Putra Simas
- Putra Sulung
- Putri Candi
- Qitarabu
- Rahmat Putra
- Raja Perdana Inti
- Raja Trans
- Rajawali
- Rajawali Citra Transportasi
- Ramayana
- Ranajaya
- Ranau Indah
- Rappan Marannu
- Rasa Sayang
- Ratulangi
- Raya*
  - Sedya Utama
- Remaja Jaya
- Restu*
  - Sinar Mandiri Mulia
- Rhema Abadi
- Rimba Raya*
- Rinjani Indah
- Rinra Trans
- Rona Indah
- Rosalia Indah*
- Royal Kencana
- Royal Platinum
- Royal Safari
  - Blue Line
- Rudi
- Sabar Indah
- Safari Dharma Raya*
- Safari Lux
- Sahaalah
- Sahabat Prima Abadi*
- Sakhindra Trans
- Samarinda Lestari
  - Bintang Mas
  - Pulau Indah Jaya
- Sapulidi
- Sampri
- Sampagul
- San
- SantGold
- Santoso Bangkit Jaya
- Santoso Kencana Sakti
- Sari Harum
- Sari Mustika
- Sarwonadhi Trans
- Sedya Mulya
- Sejahtera
- Sembodo
- Semeru*
- Sempati Star
- Senopati Bangka
- Setiawan
- Sinar Dempo
- Sinar Jaya
  - DMI
- Sinar Remaja
- Sinar Rezeki
- Sinar Sari
- Sindoro Sejahtera Mulya
- Sipirok Nauli
- Singa Raja Putra
- New Surabaya Indah
  - SPS Liner
- Srikandi
- Sugih Jaya
- Suharno Group
  - Mustika
  - Prayogo*
  - Sumber Waras
  - Sumber Waras Putra*
- Sumber Alam*
- Sumber Group
  - Sugeng Rahayu
  - Sumber Selamat
- Sumber Jaya Makmur*
- Sumber Jaya Trans*
- Surabaya Indah
- Surya Bali
- Surya Indah
- Surya Jaya
- Surya Kencana
- Surya Primadona
- Surya Trans
- SS Transport*
- Tami Jaya*
- Telaga Indah Armada
- Tentrem
- Tiara Mas
- Tispa
- Titian Mas
- TN Trans
- Trans Agung Mandiri
- Trans Flores
- Trans NTT
- Trans Nusa Tenggara
- Transnusa
- Transport Express
- Tristar Melawi
- Tujuh Dua Trans
- Tunas Antarnusa Muda*
- Tunggal Dara
- Tunggal Daya
- Tunggal Jaya*
- Ujang Jaya
- Unicorn Indorent
- Wafaa Holiday
- Warga Baru*
- Widji Lestari*
- Yessoe Travel
- Yoanda Prima
- Zafa Trans

Note:

- The * sign indicates the tour bus is also operating as an intercity bus, or vice versa.
- The ~~bus company name~~ sign indicates that the bus company has ceased operations, either as a legal entity or as an intercity bus service.

== Urban ==
=== Integrated Bus Rapid Transit ===
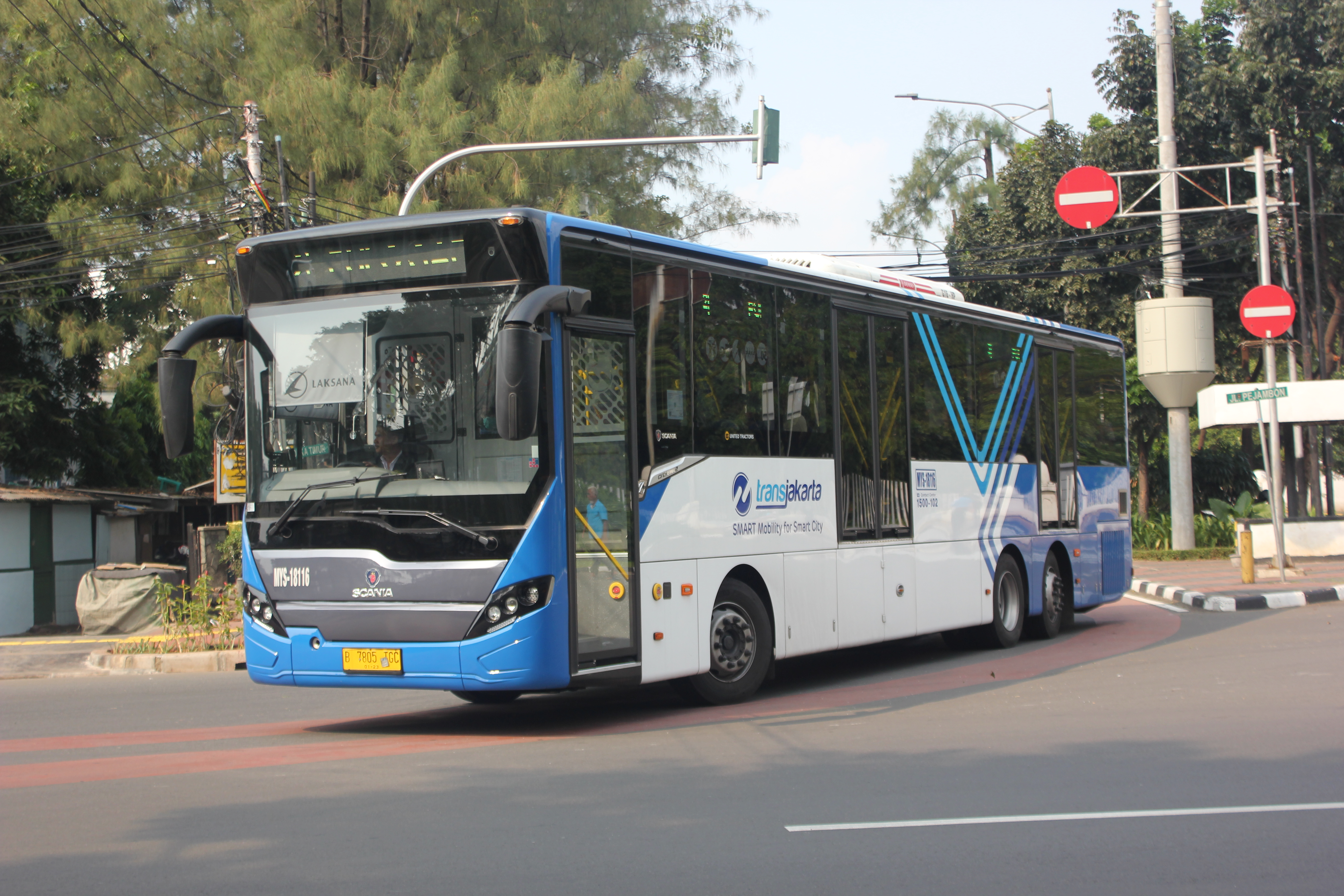
Bus rapid transit Transjakarta owned by bus operator Mayasari Bakti

==== National scope ====
- Teman Bus

==== Regional scope ====
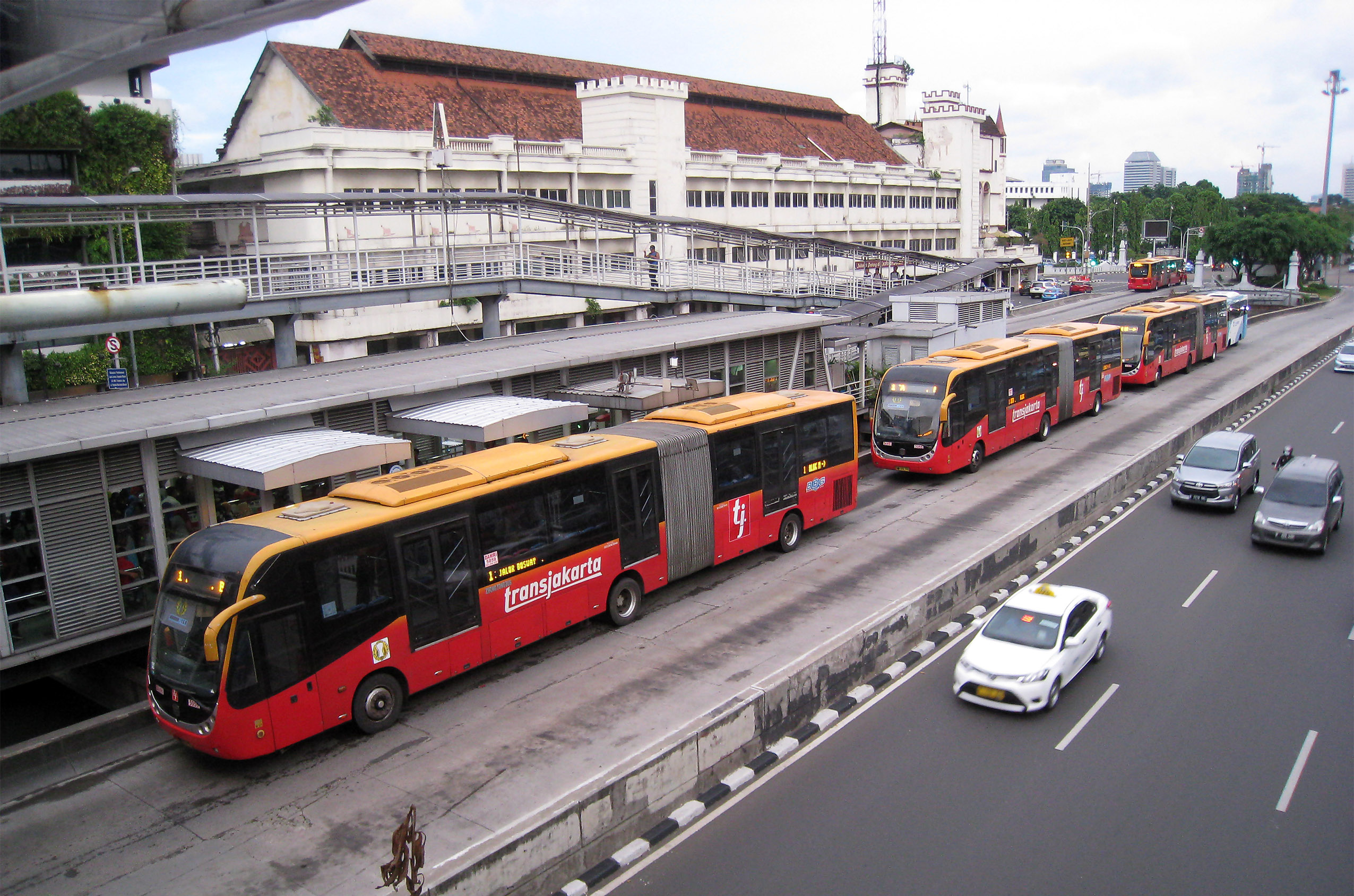
TransJakarta at Harmoni Central

- Balikpapan City Trans
- BRT Banjarbakula
- Bus Listrik Medan
- BisKita Trans Bekasi Patriot
- Trans Depok
- Trans Bandar Lampung
- Trans Banjarasmin
- Trans Banyumas
- Trans Batam
- BRT Trans Cirebon
- Trans Semanggi Suroboyo
- Transjakarta
- Trans Jayapura
- Trans Jateng
- Trans Jatim
- Trans Jogja
- Trans Koetaradja
- Trans Mamminasata
- Trans Mebidang
- Trans Metro Bandung
- Trans Metro Deli
- Trans Metro Dewata
- Trans Metro Pekanbaru
- Trans Musi Jaya
- Trans Padang
- Trans Palu
- BisKita Trans Pakuan
- Trans Palangka Raya
- Trans Pontianak Khatulistiwa
- Trans Sarbagita
- Trans Semanggi Suroboyo
- Trans Semarang
- Trans Tangerang Ayo
- Metro Jabar Trans
- Suroboyo Bus

== City bus companies ==
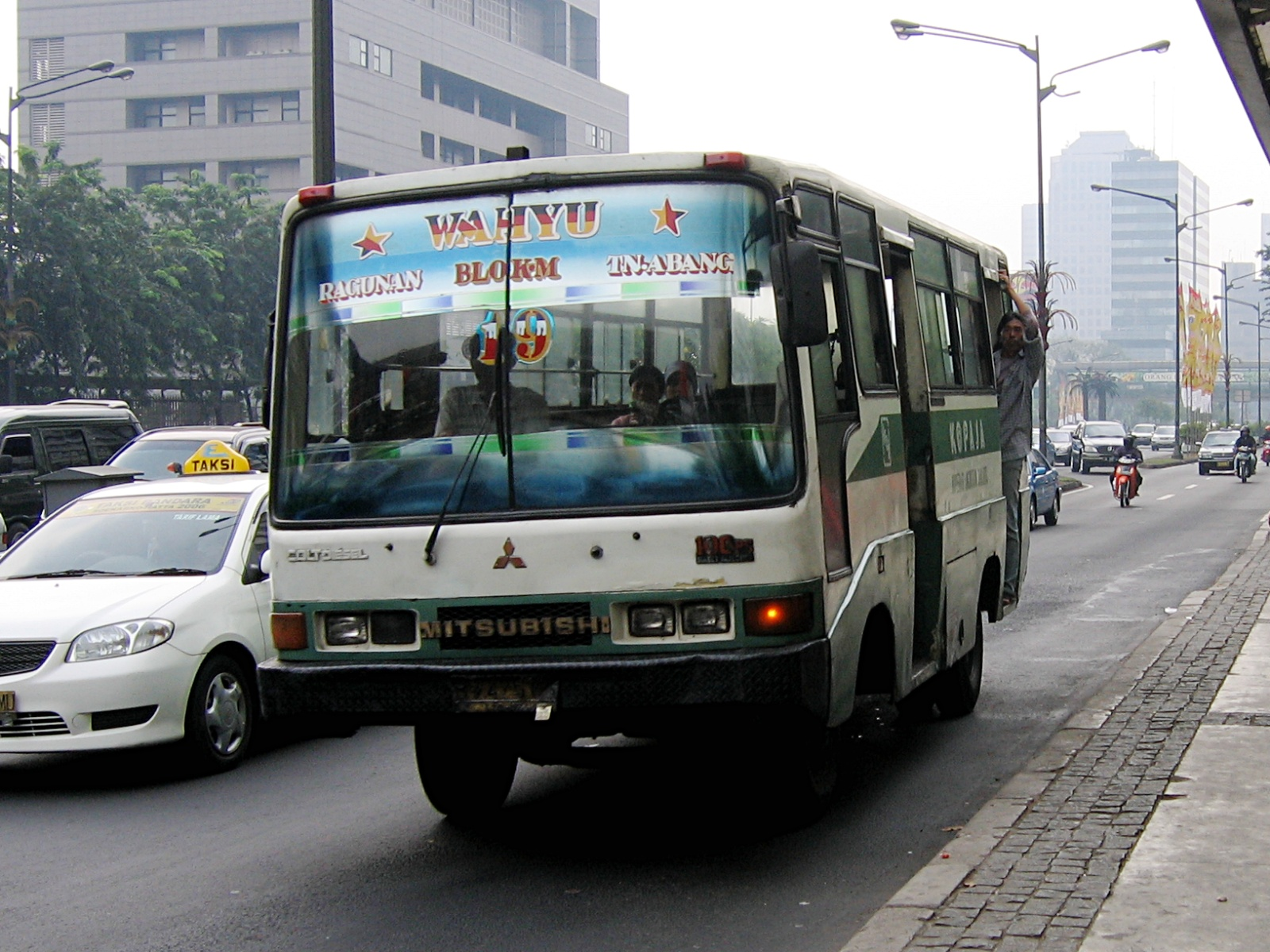
Kopaja (Koperasi Angkutan Jakarta), a former city bus of Jakarta, now replaced by Metrotrans and Minitrans buses.

=== Greater Jakarta ===
==== Active operator ====
- Bayu Holong Persada
- Bianglala Metropolitan
- Koantas Bima
- Kopaja
- Kopkarmi
- Mayasari Bakti
- MetroMini
- Metrotrans
- Mikrotrans
- Miniarta
- Minitrans
- Perum DAMRI
- Perum PPD
- Royaltrans
- Steady Safe
- Transjabodetabek
- and others

==== Former operators ====
- APTB (Angkutan Perbatasan Terintegrasi Bus Transjakarta)
- ARH (Arief Rahman Hakim)
- Arion
- BKTB (Bus Kota Terintegrasi Bus Transjakarta)
- Himpurna
- Garuda Mas
- Medal Sekarwangi
- Pahala Kencana
- SMS
- TAVIP

=== Greater Surabaya ===
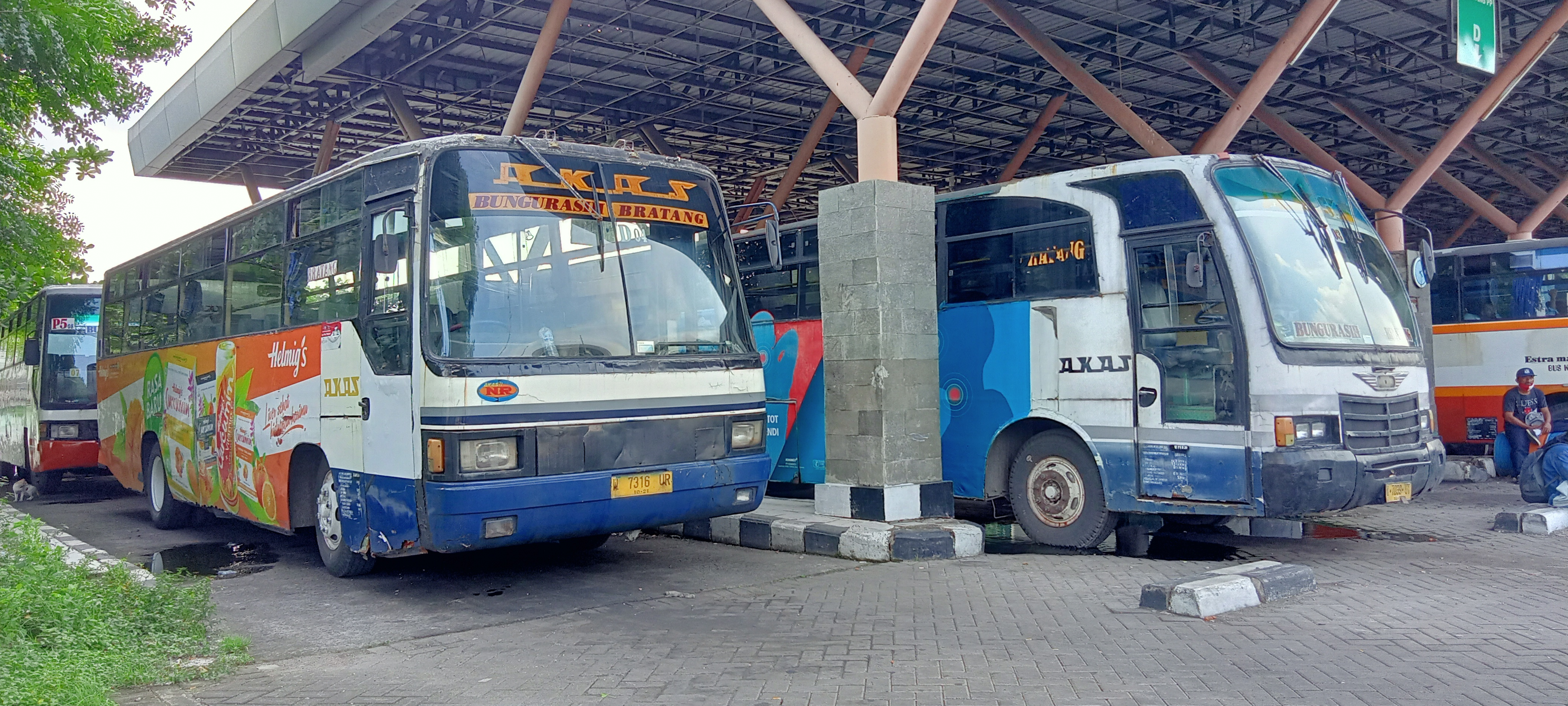
The bumper color on each regular city bus unit in Surabaya shows the class identity of the bus. The dark blue bumper is used by the economy bus unit, while the red-orange bumper is used by the patas bus unit. However, the AC patas bus unit does not use this identity, but maintains the original bumper produced by the bodywork company.

- AKAS NR
- Dua Putra
- Estraa Mandiri
- Indrapura 88
- Mandala
- Mandiri
- Perum DAMRI
- Rodta
- Sabar Indah
- Sari Indah

=== Medan ===
- Blue Bird Group (electric bus)

== Airport Transit Bus ==
- Agra Mas
- DAMRI
- Harapan Jaya
- Hiba Utama
- Lorena
- Pahala Kencana
- Primajasa/RedWhite Star
- Sinar Jaya

== Passenger and freighter ==
- Hiba Group
- Perum DAMRI
- Rosalia Indah

== Tourist bus ==
=== City tour buses ===
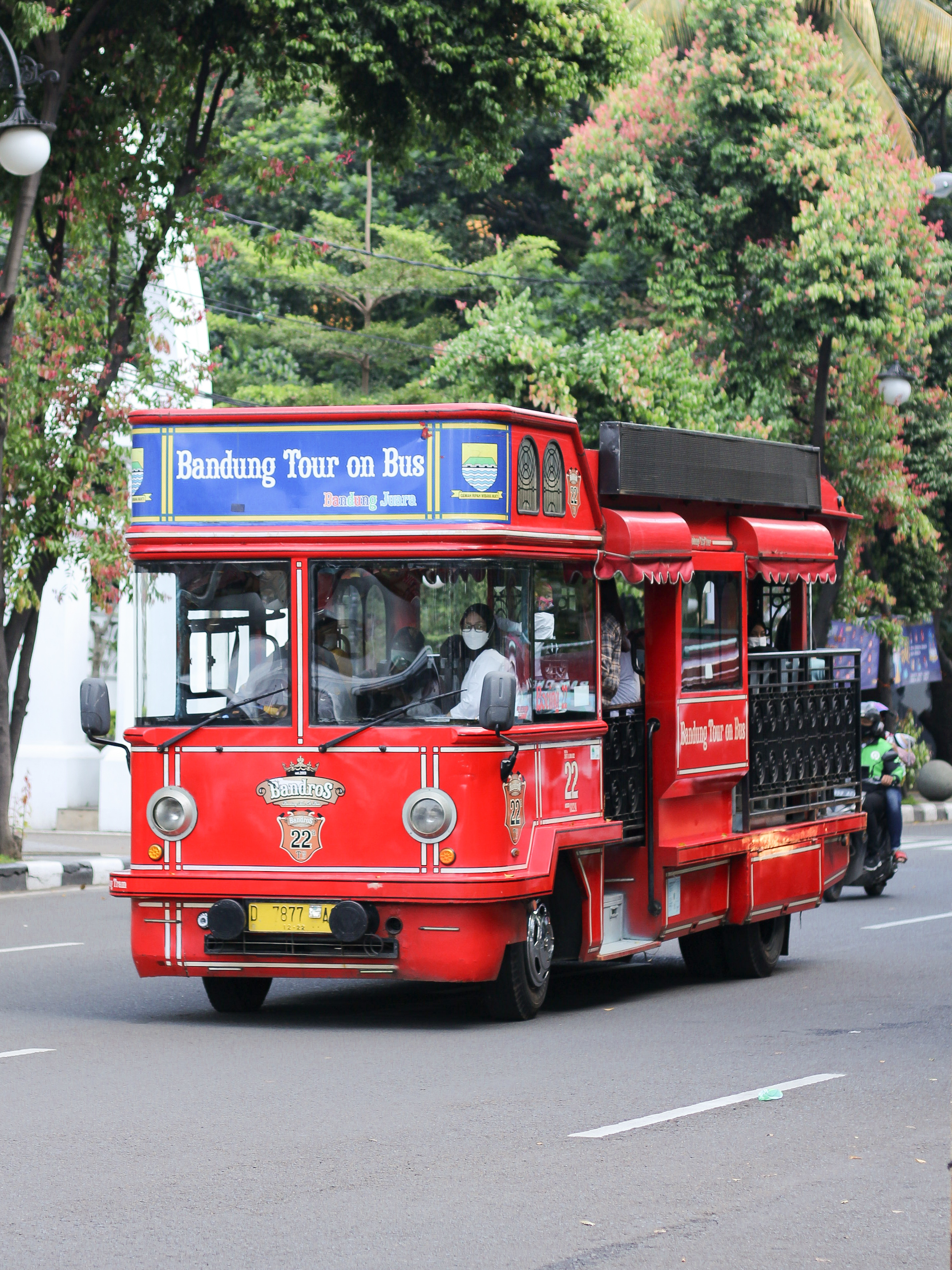
Bandros (Bandung Tour On The Bus), city tour bus in Bandung

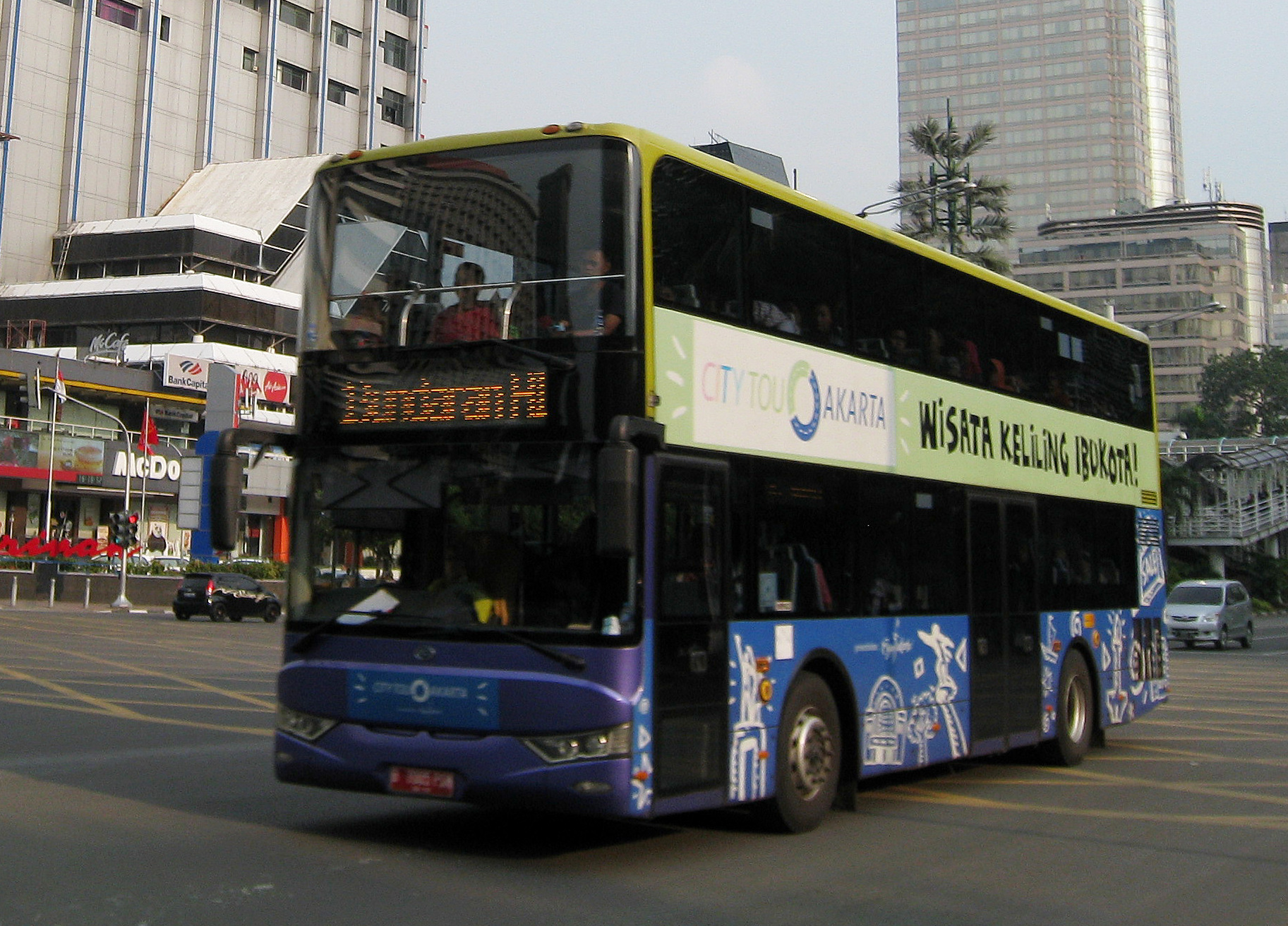
Jakarta Doubledecker Tourist Bus at Sarinah Thamrin (cropped)

- Bajajalanan (Banjarmasin)
- Balikpapan City Tour
- Bandros (Bandung)
- Bus Tram Batavia
- Jakarta City Tour
- Jawara (Tangerang)
- Jogja Heritage Track (Yogyakarta)
- Mabour (Madiun)
- Macito (Malang)
- Mpok Siti (Jakarta)
- Si Kenang (Semarang)
- Suroboyo City Tour (Surabaya)
- Surabaya Heritage Track
- SSCT (Surabaya)
- Uncal (Bogor)
- Werkudara City Tour (Surakarta)
- Medan City Tour Bus

== Off-route transportation ==
=== Tourist and rental buses ===
The following bus companies offer both tourist and charter services:

- 27Trans
- 44Trans
- Abisatya Trans
- Adi Jaya
- Afna Trans
- Agam Tungga Jaya
- Agra Icon
- Akas
  - Akas Asri
  - Akas Green
  - Akas NR
  - Akas N1
  - Akas Mila Sejahtera
- Al Akbar
- Andaru Utama
- Anugerah Gemilang Indonesia
- AO Transport
- Arjuna Samba
- Armada Jaya Perkasa
- Bagong Biru
- Bali Radiance
- Bcoach
- Beebuzz
- Bhaladika
- Bhisa
- Bigbird
- Bimo Transport
- Bin Ilyas
- Biru Samudera Trans
- Blue Star
- Brilliant
- Bris Trans
- BS Guvilli
- Budiman
- Bulan Jaya
- CitiRent
- Citra Dewi
- Daksina Trans
- Dali Mas
- DAMRI
- DEM Holidays
- Delfin Trans
- Djoko Kendil Putra
- DMH Trans
- D'Masimo Bus
- Eagle High
- Efa Transport
- Efisiensi Group
  - Ratna Sari
  - RV Trans
  - Tividi
- Eka
- Excellent Group
- Fajar Riau Wisata
- Fajar Transport
- Fransindo Trans
- Gagak Rimang
- Gana Trans Bali
- Galatama
- Gardena
- GD Bali
- GeGe Transport
- Giri Indah
- Golden Star
- Golden Ways
- Gracias
- Gunung Harta
- Harapan Jaya
- Haryanto
- Hasyim Asyari
- Hiba Utama
- Imas Putra
- Indo Trans
- Insan Maulana
- Jackal Holidays
- Juragan 99 Trans
- Kalebas
- Karyajasa
- Tourism Cherub
- KPM
- Kramat Djati
  - Tourism Expert
- Kupu Kupu Ayu
- Kwantrans
- Limas Tourism
- Limbersa
- Lirafa
- Lucky Trans
- Marissa Holiday
- Marita
- Mata Trans
- Mayasari Group
  - City Miles
  - City Trans Utama
  - RedWhite Star
- Mega Mas
- Megati Trans
- Mekar Jaya
- Melody Transport
- Metropolitan
- Midas Nusantara
- Mitra Rahayu
- MSM Asyrof
- Muji Jaya Gemilang
- Mutiara Abadi
- Nafit Trans
- Ness Transport
- New Satria Kirani
- Nirwana Luxury Tourist Bus
- NTTS Trans
- Nuansa Ilham
- Nusa Bhakti
- Nusa Indah
- Nusantara
- Nyaman Holiday
- Onebus
- Pandawa 87
- Pangeran (Aditya Ina Pratama)
- Panorama
- Patriot
- Pelita Baru
- Pesona Transport Service
- PHB Wisata
- Premium Passion
- Purnayasa
- Putra Dewantara Ayu
- Putra KJU
- Putra KSM
- QQ Trans
- Rahma Wisata
- Ramayana
- Raya
- Transport Fortune
- Remaja
- Rimba Raya
- RJB Trans
- Rosalia Indah
- Royal Java
- Dharma Raya Safari
- Sahaalah
- Eternal Prima Friends
- Sakhindra Trans
- Trans Ocean
- Sandpaper
- Sari Lorena
- Young Knights
- Semanta Transport
- Siena Tours
- SAE
- Scorpion Holidays
- Sekawan Wisata
- Sembodo
- Senja Furnindo
- SJM Trans
- SS Travelink
- Starbus
- Subur Jaya
- Suharno Group
  - Prayogo
  - Sumber Waras Putra
- Suka
- Sumber Alam
- Sumber Jaya Trans
- Surya Putra
- Syifa Putra
- SPS Travel
- TAM
- Tami Jaya
- Tentrem
- Trac Astra
- Trans Saba
- Tri Putra Jaya
- Tridara Trans
- Tunggal Jaya
- Unicorn Indorent
- Vircansa Tour Bus

=== Worker shuttle bus ===
- Bagong
- Blue Star
- Eagle High
- Harapan Jaya
- Hiba Utama / Berdikari
- Jejak Hasanah
- Kalisari
- Pakar Wisata
- Restu
- Starbus
- Trac Astra
- White Horse Group

=== Shuttle bus ===
- Arnes Shuttle
- Bagong
- Bejeu
- Budiman
- Bhinneka Sangkuriang
- Cititrans
- DayTrans
- Efisiensi
- Indo Trans
- Joglosemar
- Lintas Shuttle
- Mayasari Group
  - RedWhite Star
  - TRAVL
- Muji Jaya Pitoe
- Pasteur Trans
- Putra Remaja
- Rimba Raya
- Rosalia Indah
- Sahabat Shuttle
- Sempati Star
- Sinar Jaya
- Sumber Alam

=== Residential shuttle bus ===
- AO Shuttle
- DAMRI
- Lorena
- Sinar Jaya
- Transjakarta
- Wifend Darma Persada

=== Airport apron bus ===
- Gapura Angkasa (operated by Safari Dharma Raya)

== See also ==
- List of buses
- List of trolleybus systems
- List of bus rapid transit systems
- List of bus transit systems in Indonesia
- List of bus operating companies
- Public transport bus service
- Pulo Gebang Bus Terminal
- Transport in Indonesia
