= Trans Jatim =

Overview
- Owner: East Java Department of Transportation
- Area served: Surabaya metropolitan area; Malang metropolitan area
- Number of lines: 8 Route Regular Class; 2 Route Luxury Class
- Headquarters: East Java Department of Transportation Jalan Ahmad Yani Nomor 268, Kelurahan Menanggal, Kecamatan Gayungan, Kota Surabaya 60234 Indonesia
- Website: https://www.instagram.com/officialtransjatim/

Operation
- Began operation: 19 August 2022; 4 years ago
- Operators: Perum DAMRI Surabaya, PT Harapan Jaya Mining Transport, PT Bagong Dekaka Makmur, PT Yukida Multi Sinergy, PT Menggala Garuda Lokatara

Trans Jatim is a BRT public transport system that serves in metropolitan area in East Java, like Surabaya metropolitan area and Malang metropolitan area. Trans Jatim using scheme Buy The Service for the operational. Trans Jatim using many bus operator like Perum Damri, PT. Harapan Jaya Mining Transport, PT. Bagong Dekaka Makmur, PT. Yukida Multi Sinergy, and PT. Menggala Garuda Lokatara. Trans Jatim has unique name of its route. Naming route of Trans Jatim using history based like Kingdom name and Nobleman name in old empire at East Java.

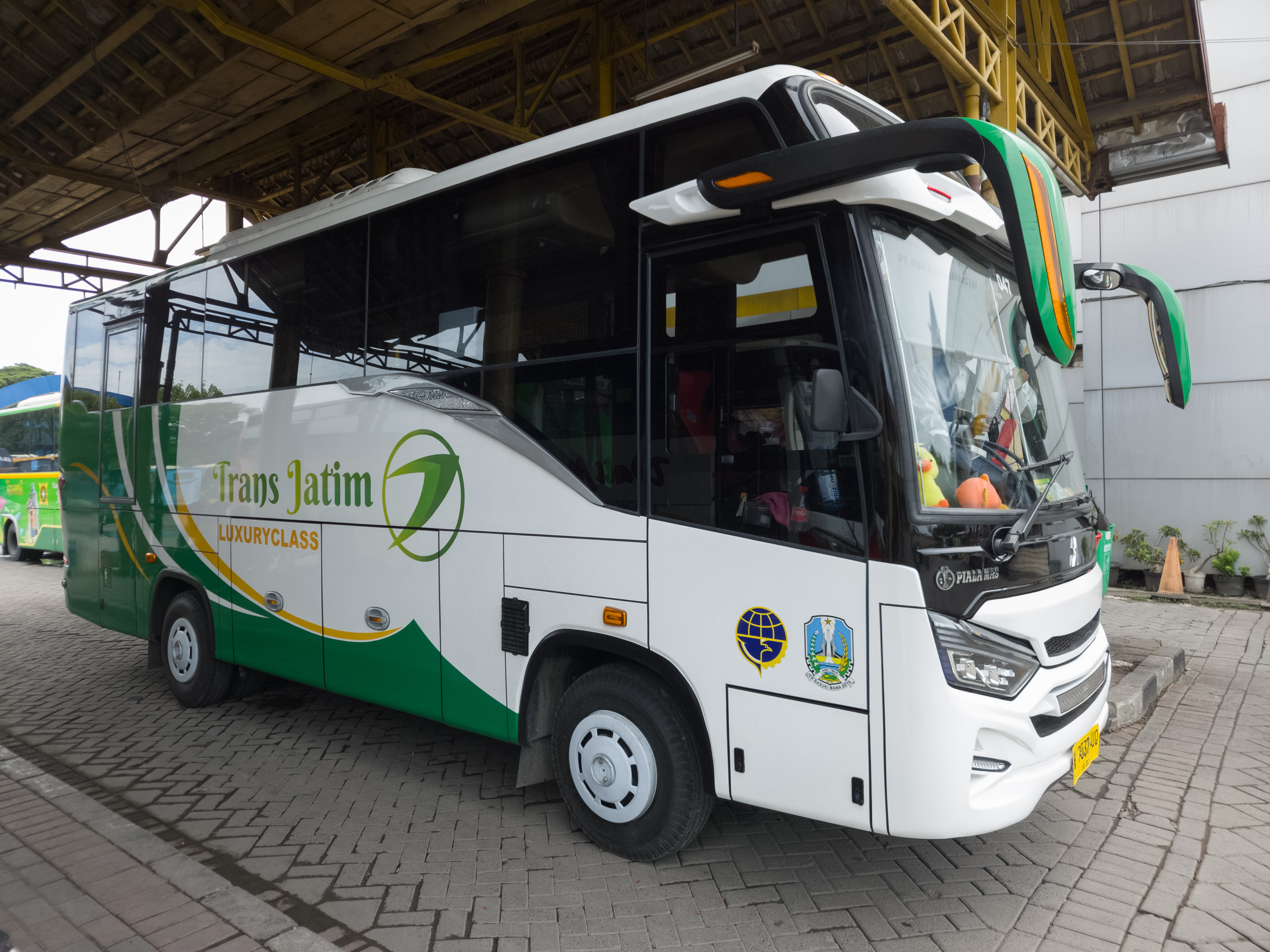
Trans Jatim K1 Luxury bus waiting in Bunder Bus Terminal

== History ==
Before Trans Jatim planned, there was Trans Gerbangkertosusila (BRT public transport) service. From lockdown COVID-19 in April 2020, all Trans Gerbangkertosusila service in 1 route (Porong - Purabaya) operation were stopped. After lockdown were loosened, East Java Government planning masterplan of BRT every East Java metropolitan area.

Trans Jatim first route inaugurated on 19 August 2022. The first route service Bunder - Purabaya - Porong route. After that, Trans Jatim planned to make bus stop connected to other public transport like Suroboyo Bus, Wira-Wiri, and Trans Semanggi Suroboyo.

== Fares ==
Trans Jatim using various method of purchasing like:

Methode Payment	Operator	Fares Category	
Methode Payment	Operator	Public	Student
Cash		Rp 5.000	Rp 2.500
Card	Mandiri e-money BCA Flazz BRIZZI BNI TapCash KMT KAI Commuter	Rp 5.000	Rp 2.500
E-Wallet	Gopay Astrapay LinkAja QRIS	Rp 5.000	Rp 2.500

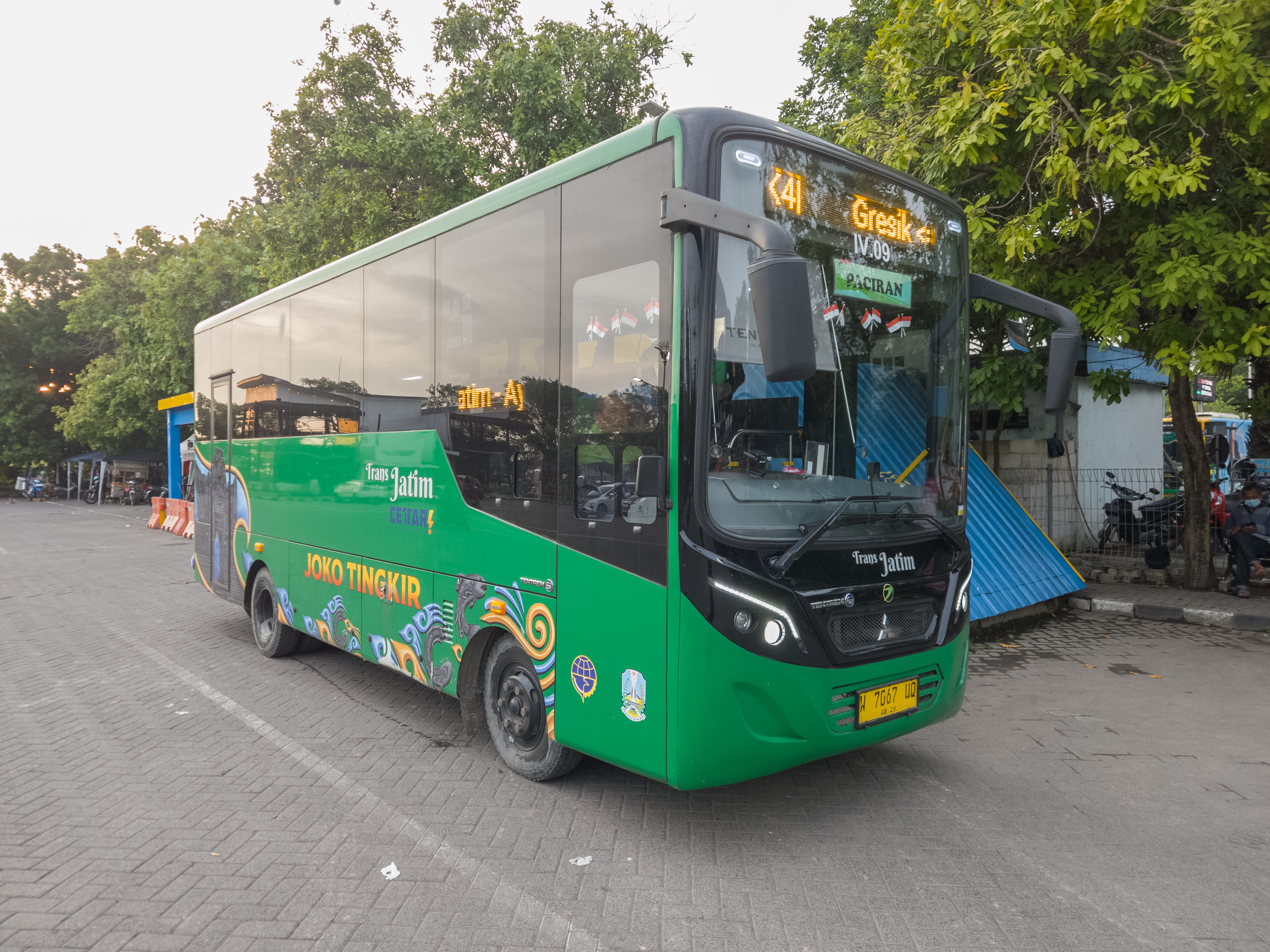
Trans Jatim K4 Bus waiting in Bunder Bus Terminal

== Tracking Application ==
Trans Jatim using application TRANSJATIM - AJAIB. Application can be downloaded in Google Play Store and Apple App Store. Feature in application like tracking bus position, bus stop position, and route information in real time.

== Route ==
Trans Jatim has 8 route regular class, and 2 route luxury class.

Route Title	Route Code	Colour	Start Route	Stop at	End Route	Bus Stop Amount	Bus Amount	Length Route	Operation Time
Surabaya Metropolitan Area
Raden Wijaya	J1	Green	Porong Bus Terminal (Sidoarjo)	Purabaya Bus Terminal	Bunder Bus Terminal (Gresik)	39	40	72 km	05.00 - 21.00 (Last start 19.00)
Tribhuwana Tunggadewi	J2	Light Blue	Kertajaya Bus Terminal (Mojokerto)	Dukuh Menanggal (Surabaya)	Kertajaya Bus Terminal (Mojokerto)	38	22	42 km	04.00 - 21.40 (Last start 19.00)
Dyah Suhita	J3	Orange	Kertajaya Bus Terminal (Mojokerto)		Bunder Bus Terminal (Gresik)	68	15	30 km	05.00 - 21.20 (Last start 19.30)
Jaka Tingkir	J4	Brown	Bunder Bus Terminal (Gresik)		Paciran Bus Terminal (Lamongan)	74	15	54 km	05.00 - 21.10 (Last start 19.10)
Cakraningrat	J5	Indigo	Purabaya Bus Terminal		Bangkalan Bus Terminal (Bangkalan)	67	15	59 km	05.00 - 21.00 (Last start 19.10)
Patih Gajah Mada	J6	Pink	Porong Bus Terminal (Sidoarjo)	Mojosari Bus Terminal (Mojokerto)	Kertajaya Bus Terminal (Mojokerto)	60	15	34 km	05.00 - 21.00 (Last start 19.30)
Sunan Drajat	J7	Dark Brown	Paciran Bus Terminal (Lamongan)		Lamongan Bus Terminal (Lamongan)	86	15	47 km	05.00 - 21.10 (Last start 19.20)
Malang Metropolitan Area
Gajayana	N1	Blue	Batu Bus Terminal (Batu)	Langdungsari Bus Terminal	Hamid Rusdi Bus Terminal	71	14	41 km	05.00 - 21.30 (last start 19.20)
Luxury Class
K1 Luxury	L1	Purple	Porong Bus Terminal (Sidoarjo)	Purabaya Bus Terminal	Bunder Bus Terminal (Gresik)	39	6	72 km	05.20 - 20.00
K4 Luxury	L4	Magenta	Bunder Bus Terminal (Gresik)		Paciran Bus Terminal (Lamongan)	74	0	54 km	05.40 - 20.00
