= NPM =

NPM may refer to:

== Organizations ==
- npm, Inc., a software development and hosting company in the United States
- Naikilah Perusahaan Minang, an Indonesian bus operator company
- National Postal Museum, the primary postal museum in the United States
- National Palace Museum, a museum in Taiwan
- NPM/CNP (Compagnie Nationale à Portefeuille SA), a Belgian non-listed holding company
- New People's Militia, India

== Technology ==
- npm, the default package manager for the JavaScript runtime environment Node.js
- Network performance management
- Nintendo Power magazine, a video game magazine

== Other uses ==
- Nils Petter Molvær, a Norwegian jazz trumpeter, also known as NPM (born 1960)
- New Public Management, a management doctrine for governments
- Net profit margin, a measure of profitability
