= List of bus transit systems in Indonesia =

The following is a list of bus transit systems in Indonesia with active regular service. The list excludes defunct services, charter buses, private bus operators, and long-distance intercity buses. Many of the systems self-characterize as bus rapid transit, but most are not certified by Institute for Transportation and Development Policy.

== List ==
System	City(s) served	Opened	Routes	Fleet	Daily ridership	References
Transjakarta	Greater Jakarta	15 January 2004	14 main and 65 feeder (2024) (Note: Excluding MikroTrans feeders, tour buses, charter services, and special services.)	4,388 (2024)	1.01 million (2024)	
Trans Semarang	Semarang and Semarang Regency	17 September 2009	8 main and 4 feeder (2025)	305 (2025)	35,900 (2024)	
Trans Jogja	Yogyakarta, Bantul, Sleman	18 February 2008	20 (2025)	116 (2025)	24,550 (2024)	
Batik Solo Trans	Surakarta, Sukoharjo, Boyolali, Karanganyar	1 September 2010	6 main and 6 feeder (2024)	42 (2025)	13,800 (2023) (Note: 4,872,803 between 1 January to 20 December 2023.)	
Trans Metro Deli	Medan		5 (2024)	72 (2024)	13,750 (2023)	
Trans Padang	Padang	14 February 2014	6 (2025)	72 (2024)	9,860 (2023)	
BisKita Trans Pakuan	Bogor and Bogor Regency	2 November 2021	2 (2025)	19 (2025)	8,350 (2024) (Note: 2,103,458 passengers from 1 January to 9 September 2024.)	
Suroboyo Bus	Surabaya	7 April 2018	3 (2024)	39 (2024)	5,440 (2024)	
Trans Mamminasata	Makassar	13 November 2021	4 (2023)	87 (2023)	5,010 (2023)	
Trans Batam	Batam	18 July 2005	9 (2024)	95 (2025)	c. 5,000 (2025)	
Trans Depok	Depok	14 July 2024	1 (2024)	15 (2024)	4,820 (2024) (Note: 891,131 passengers between 14 July to 31 December 2024.)	
Trans Metro Dewata	Denpasar metropolitan area	7 September 2020 (Note: Service was terminated between 1 January and 19 April 2025 before resuming in 20 April due to budget cuts.)	6 (2024)	105 (2024)	4,765 (2024)	
Trans Banyumas	Banyumas	5 December 2021	3 (2024)	52 (2024)	4,510 (2024)	
Trans Metro Pekanbaru	Pekanbaru	18 June 2009	8 (2024)	38 (2024)	c. 4,500 (2024)	
Trans Banjarbakula	Banjarmasin metropolitan area	2019	4 (2024)		c. 4,000 (2023)	
Trans Musi Jaya	Palembang		4 (2024)	66 (2024)	3,930 (2023)	
Trans Tangerang Ayo	Tangerang City	1 December 2016	4 (2024)	40 (2024)	2,620 (2024)	
Trans Koetaradja	Banda Aceh	4 April 2016	10 (2024)	59 (2024)	2,610 (2024)	
Trans Bekasi Patriot	Bekasi	3 March 2024	5 (2024)	15 (2024)	c. 2,000 (2024)	
Trans Metro Bandung	Bandung		5 (2024)	34 (2024)	1,920 (2023)	
Trans Cirebon	Cirebon	12 April 2021	2 (2024)	10 (2024)	210 (2024)	
SATRIA Bus	Kediri	1 September 2023	1 (2024)	5 (2024)	c. 70 (2024)	
Balikpapan City Trans	Balikpapan	8 July 2024	3 (2024)	19 (2024)	N/A	
Trans Wibawa Mukti	Bekasi Regency	1 December 2024	1 (2024)	15 (2024)	N/A	
