= Rajawali Corpora =

Indonesian holding company

PT Rajawali Corpora
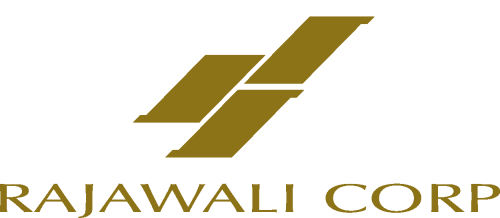

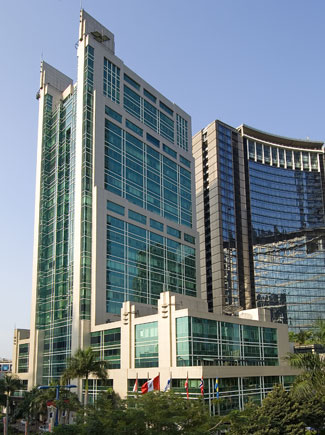
- Rajawali Tower in Setiabudi, Jakarta
- Formerly: PT Rajawali Wira Bhakti Utama (1984–1993); PT Rajawali Corporation (1993–2008)
- Company type: Private
- Industry: Conglomerate
- Founded: 1 February 1984; 42 years ago
- Founder: Peter Sondakh
- Headquarters: Jakarta, Indonesia
- Key people: Peter Sondakh (Chairman and CEO); Abed Nego (CFO)
- Products: Agriculture; Media; Communication; Mining; Natural resources; Property
- Services: Information; Technology; Transportation; Hospitality
- Website: www.rajawali.com

PT Rajawali Corpora (RC) is an Indonesian holding company based in Jakarta, Indonesia. The corporation was formerly established in 1984 by Peter Sondakh as Rajawali Wira Bhakti Utama. Throughout the decades, Rajawali has developed into a regional player in several major business ventures and portfolios, ranging from agriculture, infrastructure, information, technology, consumer goods, media, communication, mining, natural resources, property, hospitality, retail, and transportation services.

In 2004, Sondakh founded Rajawali Foundation (RF) as the philanthropic arm of Rajawali Corpora. The mission of RF is to promote peace, prosperity, and the conservation of Indonesia's natural heritage through support for research, education, and training. The foundation's emphasis on education reflects Sondakh's view that knowledge, skills, and creativity are the true foundations of equitable and sustainable economic development.

== Business units ==
=== Current ===
- Archi Indonesia
  - Meares Soputan Mining
  - Tambang Tondano Nusajaya
- Eagle High Plantations
- Fortune Indonesia
  - Fortune Pramana Rancang
  - Pelita Alembana
  - Fortune Adwicipta
- Indo Mines
- Rajawali Property Group
  - Rajawali Place (under development)
  - St. Regis Jakarta (under development)
  - St. Regis Bali Resort
  - St. Regis Langkawi
  - Four Seasons Jakarta
  - The Laguna Resort & Spa
  - The Westin Langkawi
  - Sheraton Senggigi Beach Resort
  - Sheraton Imperial Hotel
  - Novotel Lombok Resort
- Rajawali Televisi
- Velo Networks

=== Former ===
- RCTI (1987–2000), sold to MNC Media.
- Bank Pos Nusantara (1989–1999), merged into Bank Danamon.
- Express Group (1989–2020), sold to other shareholders though Rajawali still has the 10.7% equity share.
- Bentoel Group (1991–2009), sold to British American Tobacco.
- Metro Department Store (1991–2000), sold to CT Corp.
- Excelcomindo Pratama (1989–2007), sold to Axiata.
- Semen Gresik (2006–2010), reorganized into a subsidiary of Semen Indonesia Group.
- Nusantara Infrastructure (2010–2017)
- Golden Eagle Energy (2012–2023)
