= Trans Sarbagita =

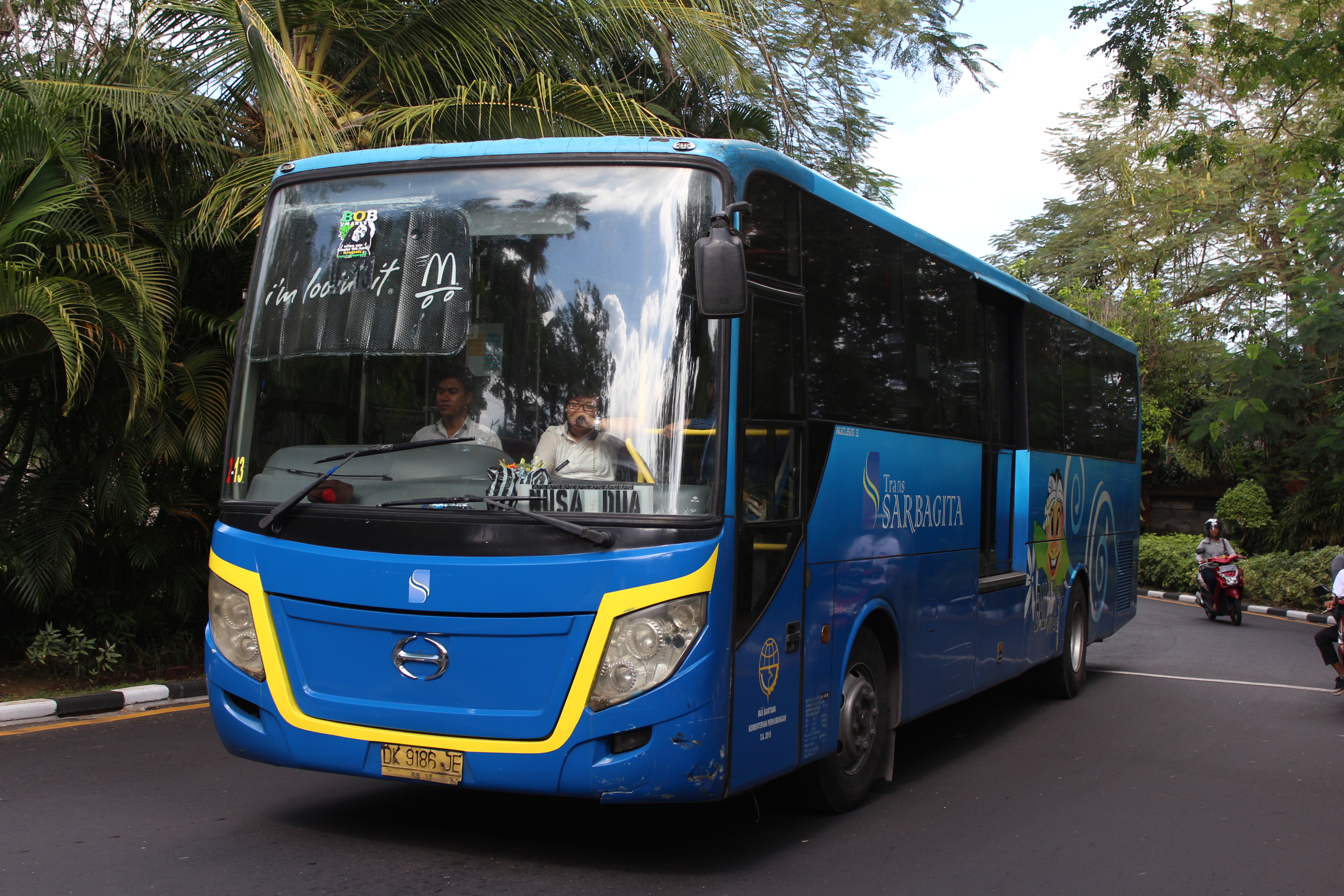

Overview
- Locale: Denpasar, Bali, Indonesia
- Transit type: bus rapid transit
- Number of lines: 1 as of 2026
- Number of stations: 31 Stations
- Daily ridership: 5,000 passengers per day (2014)

Operation
- Began operation: 18 August 2011; 15 years ago

Technical
- System length: 42 Km

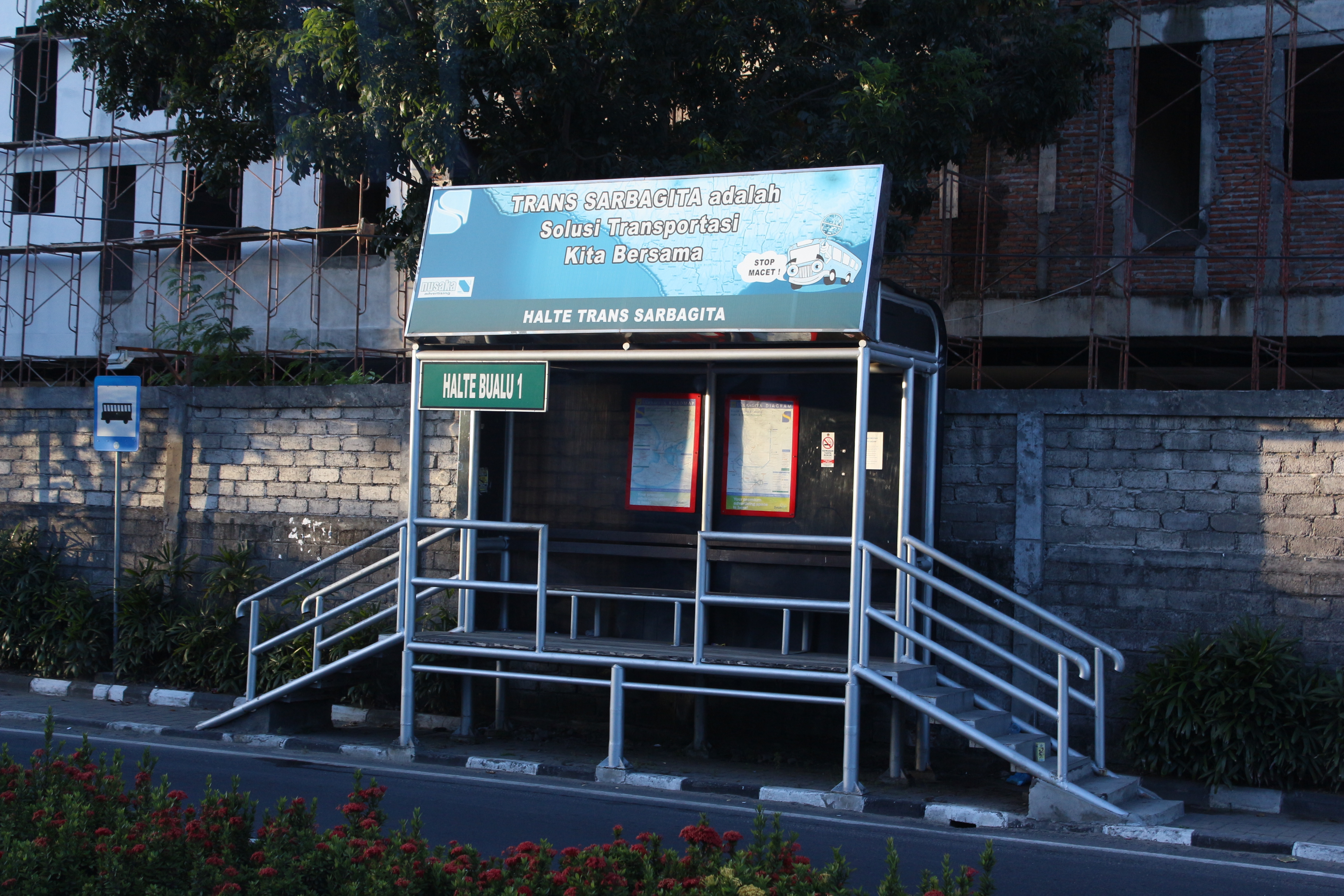
Bus Stop "Bualu 1" in Bali, Indonesia.

Trans Sarbagita is a bus rapid transit (BRT) system in Denpasar metropolitan area, Bali, Indonesia. Its operational area includes Denpasar, Badung Regency, Tabanan Regency, and Gianyar Regency.

As of 2014, the buses carried 5,000 passengers per day with 25 buses in operation. In 2015 Trans Sarbagita launched two new routes, Tabanan-Mengwi-Bandara and Mahendradata-Sanur-Lebih. As of 2025, only route number 1 is still operational owing to the system being mostly replaced by the newer Trans Metro Dewata bus system. Tickets are 4400 IDR for adults. The average time between buses is over an hour as of 2022.

== Routes ==
2026 Bus Rapid Transit route map in the Denpasar area. On this map, Trans Sarbagita is marked with the prefix S1 (thin line, light teal).

Route	Route
1	Kota - Garuda Wisnu Kencana
2	Batubulan - Sentral Parkir Kuta - Nusa Dua
3	Sanur - Renon - Petitenget
4	Batubulan - Jl. Gatot Subroto - Bandara
5	Sanur - Kedewatan - Ubud
6	Mengwi - Kota - Benoa Harbour
7	Tabanan - Mengwi - Bandara
8	Sentral Parkir Kuta - Tanah Lot
9	Batubulan - Kota - Sentral Parkir Kuta
10	Sanur - Bandara - Nusa Dua
11	Mahendradata - Sanur - Lebih Beach
12	Sanur - Kota - Canggu
13	Gianyar - Mengwi - Tabanan
14	Ubung - Buluh Indah - Sentral Parkir Kuta
15	Mengwi - Dalung - Batubulan
16	Tegal - Mambal
17	Mengwi - Darmasaba - Batubulan

== Feeder services ==
Trans Sarbagita had seven feeder services that continue on the narrow roads and connect to the main bus corridors. There are three services in the Badung Regency, and four services in Denpasar city. The ticket prices are 3,000 IDR for adults and 2,000 IDR for students in C1, F1 and F2. 8,000 IDR for adults and 2,000 IDR for students in TP 01, TP 02, TP 03 and TP 04. In 2015, the feeder services were suspended due to low ridership.

Feeder	Route	Fleet Colours
S1	Tegal - Sentral Parkir Kuta - Bandara	Dark Blue
F1	Tanjung Benoa - Garuda Wisnu Kencana	White and Green
F2	Kedonganan - Garuda Wisnu Kencana - Uluwatu	White and Green
TP 01	Kota - Renon - Jl. Sudirman	Light Green
TP 02	Sanur - Jl.Simpang Enam Teuku Umar	Light Green
TP 03	Jl.Nias (RS Sanglah) - Jl.Simpang Enam Teuku Umar - Pemogan - Jl. P.Kawe - Jl.Nias (RS Sanglah)	Light Green
TP 04	Jl.Sudirman - Jl.Waturenggong - Sidakarya	Light Green

== Minibus (Non Feeder) ==
Angkot services other than feeder services is also exist in Denpasar City. they operated and owned mostly by driver itself and the service is not integrated to Trans Sarbagita since the feeder service is suspended.

Feeder	Route	Fleet colours
A	Kereneng - Sanur - Semawang	Green
E	Kereneng - Jl.Teuku Umar - Jl.Gatot Subroto - Jl.A.Yani - Kereneng	Light Yellow
F	Kereneng - Nitimandala Renon - Jl.Teuku Umar - Jl.Gatot Subroto - Jl.Nangka - Kereneng	Light Yellow and Red
G	Tegal Bus Station - Jl.Teuku Umar - Gemeh - Nitimandala Renon - Sanur - Semawang	Dark Blue and White
L	Gunung Agung Bus Station - Padang Indah Monang-Maning	Orange
S4	Suci - Pesanggaran - Benoa Harbour	Grey
S7	Suci - Sidakarya - Suwung Kangin - Semawang	Grey and Yellow
S8	Suci - Pesanggaran - Benoa Harbour - Suwung Kauh Via Bypass Ngurah Rai	Grey and Green
UK	Ubung Bus Station - Kereneng	Blue and Red
US	Ubung Bus Station - RS Sanglah	Blue and Yellow
KS	Kereneng - RS Sanglah	Blue and Black
UT	Ubung Bus Station - Tegal Bus Station	Green

== Fleet ==
Operator	Fleet
Perum DAMRI	Mitsubishi Fuso FE 84BC
