= Trans Semanggi Suroboyo =

Bus transit system in Surabaya, Indonesia

- Logo of Trans Semanggi Suroboyo

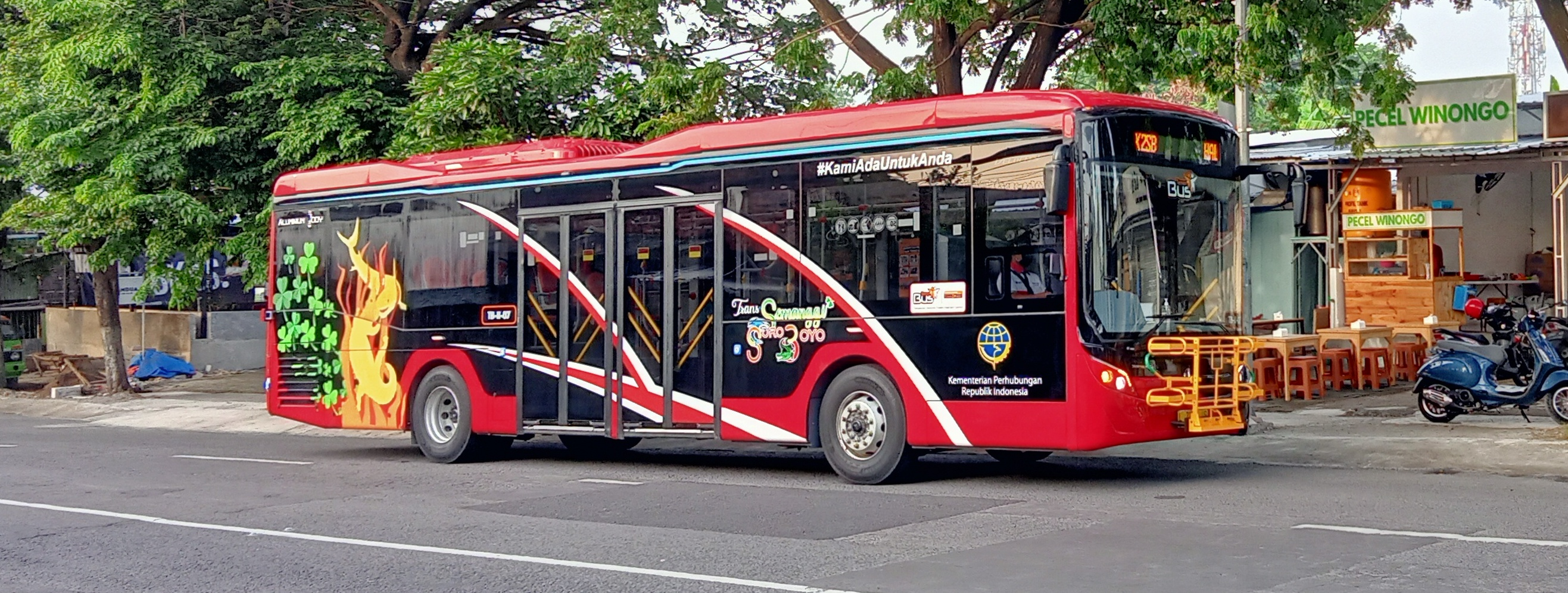
- Trans Semanggi Suroboyo bus stopped at Babatan bus stop, 3 February 2022.

Overview
- Owner: Ministry of Transportation
- Area served: Greater Surabaya
- Locale: Surabaya, Indonesia
- Transit type: Transit bus
- Number of lines: 2 corridors (peak, in 2025)
- Headquarters: Surabaya Office of Transportation, Dukuh Menanggal, Gayungan, Surabaya, Indonesia

Operation
- Began operation: 29 December 2021; 4 years ago
- Operators: PT Seduluran Bus Suroboyo; INKA
System map

Trans Semanggi Suroboyo (Note: Also called Surabaya BTS, Teman Bus Surabaya, Trans SBS, or Trans Metro Surabaya.), abbreviated TSS, was a Transit bus system in Surabaya, East Java, Indonesia. The entire system is operated via the Teman Bus Buy-The-Service scheme initiated by the Indonesian Ministry of Transportation. The system was officially opened on 29 December 2021, making it the tenth city in Indonesia to implement the scheme. The bus fleet procurement is conducted by the Ministry of Transportation, while its operational management is handled by third-party companies such as PT Seduluran Bus Suroboyo and state-owned bus company Perum DAMRI. It has since been acquired by Suroboyo Bus.

== Routes ==
During its time of operation, Trans Semanggi Suroboyo operated two routes:

- K2L – Kejawan Putih Tambak – UNESA Lidah Wetan
- K3L – Terminal Purabaya – Gunung Anyar – ITS – Kenjeran Park

== Fleet ==
K2L used 17 Tentrem New Velocity W5 buses on Mercedes O 200 U chassis'.

K3L used 14 Laksana Nucleus buses, formerly used in Teman Bus' Trans Jogja operation. K3L also formerly used INKA E-Inobuses in 2024.

== Payment and Integration ==
During commencement of service, K2L and K3L implemented an IDR 6,200 fare, with a IDR 2,000 fare for students.

Starting May 2025, K2L implemented an IDR 5,000 fare for the general public and an IDR 2,5000 fare for students, in line with Suroboyo Bus. K2L also accepted payment via QRIS Tap, electronic payment cards, as well as digital tickets pre-purchased in the GOBIS app. Users of the GOBIS app can also pay for tickets in bulk at discounted prices that can also be used in Suroboyo Bus routes. K3L did not receive this fare integration until its closure at the end of 2025.

== History ==
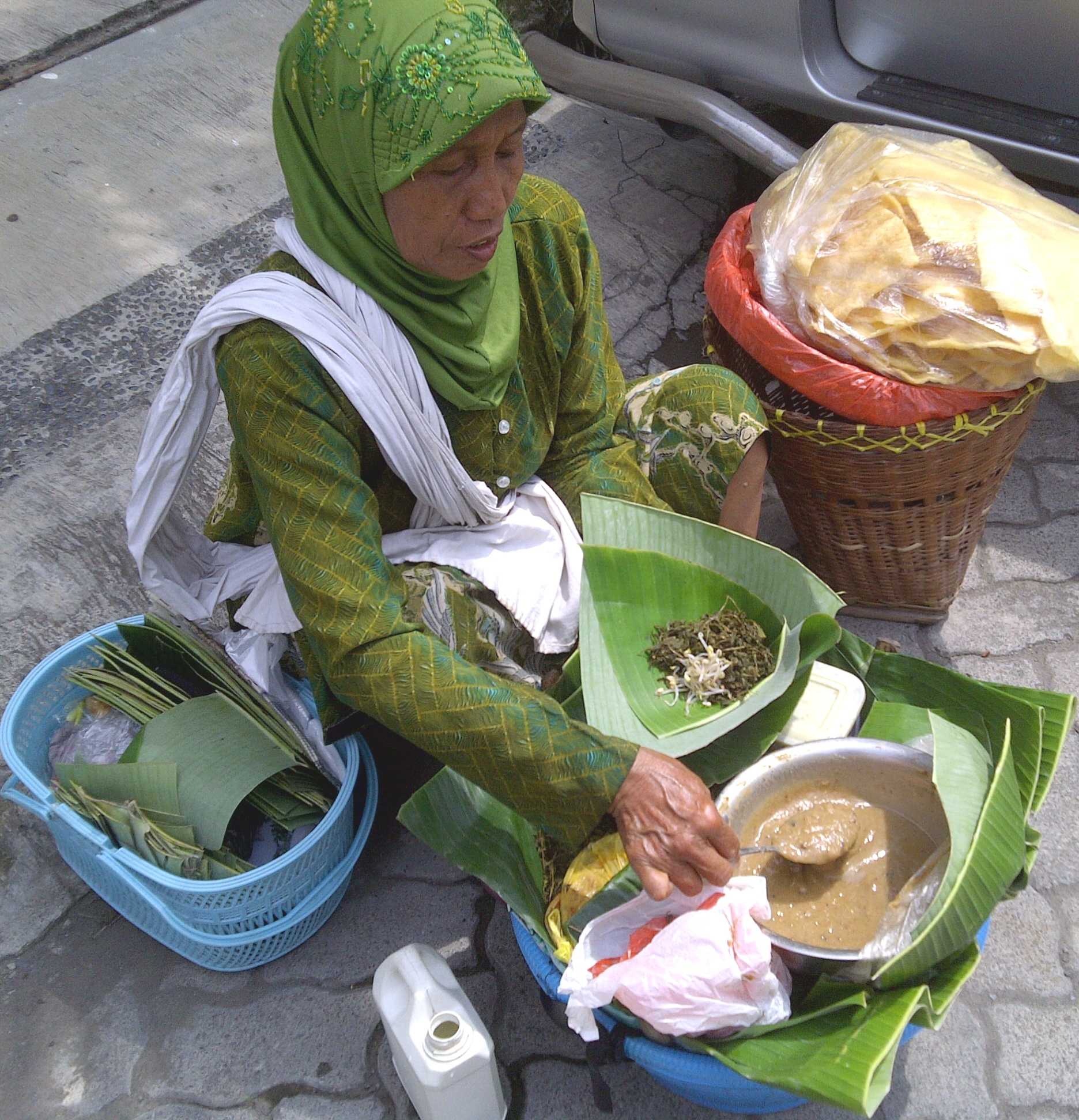
A woman is serving a portion of pecel semanggi, a special dish of Surabaya.

On 22 October 2020, the Director General of Land Transportation within the Indonesian Ministry of Transportation, Budi Setiyadi, signed a memorandum of understanding with the Mayor of Surabaya, Tri Rismaharini regarding the plan and implementation of a road-based transportation program with a BTS scheme in Surabaya. Surabaya is part of the pilot project for the Teman Bus program with nine other cities in Indonesia. Surabaya received a grant of 104 bus units from the ministry, which will be operated in six different corridors. Its procurement program starts in mid-2021, later than the other planned nine cities.

The Director General of Land Transportation carried out an auction for the third party operator of Surabaya city bus system development on 29 October 2021. Based on the selection and verification results, PT Seduluran Bus Suroboyo was eligible to become the operator. It is a joint consortium of three existing autobus companies providing intercity bus services in East Java, such as PT Kalisari Citra Jaya, PT Harapan Jaya Prima and PT Tentrem Sejahtera Karoseri.

The system, which later named Trans Semanggi Suroboyo, was finally launched in a ceremony on 29 December 2021, at Surabaya City Hall. Originally one of the corridors launched was planned to start operating on 1 January 2022, however, this plan was postponed, following a circular letter from the Director General of Land Transportation to the Surabaya city government dated 31 December 2021 called for the temporary suspension of Teman Bus operation. It is issued because the Ministry of Transportation is currently conducting a thorough evaluation and finalizing a number of technical operations on Teman Bus services. After being postponed for a month, the Corridor 2 (Lidah Wetan–Kejawan Putih Tambak) began its operation on 1 February 2022.

During the 2025 August protests and rioting, Trans Semanggi K2L experiences partial service interruptions during the 29th, 30th, and 31st. Service either bypassed several stops or halted prematurely.

=== Naming ===
"Trans Semanggi Suroboyo" is the official brand of Teman Bus service in Surabaya. Its name comes from pecel semanggi, one of Surabaya's traditional dish and a cultural heritage. The dish uses clover (semanggi) leaves as one of its main ingredients. Kampoeng Semanggi Benowo, a culinary center located in Benowo district of Surabaya, is an area that is well known for clover cultivation and the dish preservation.

== Corridors ==
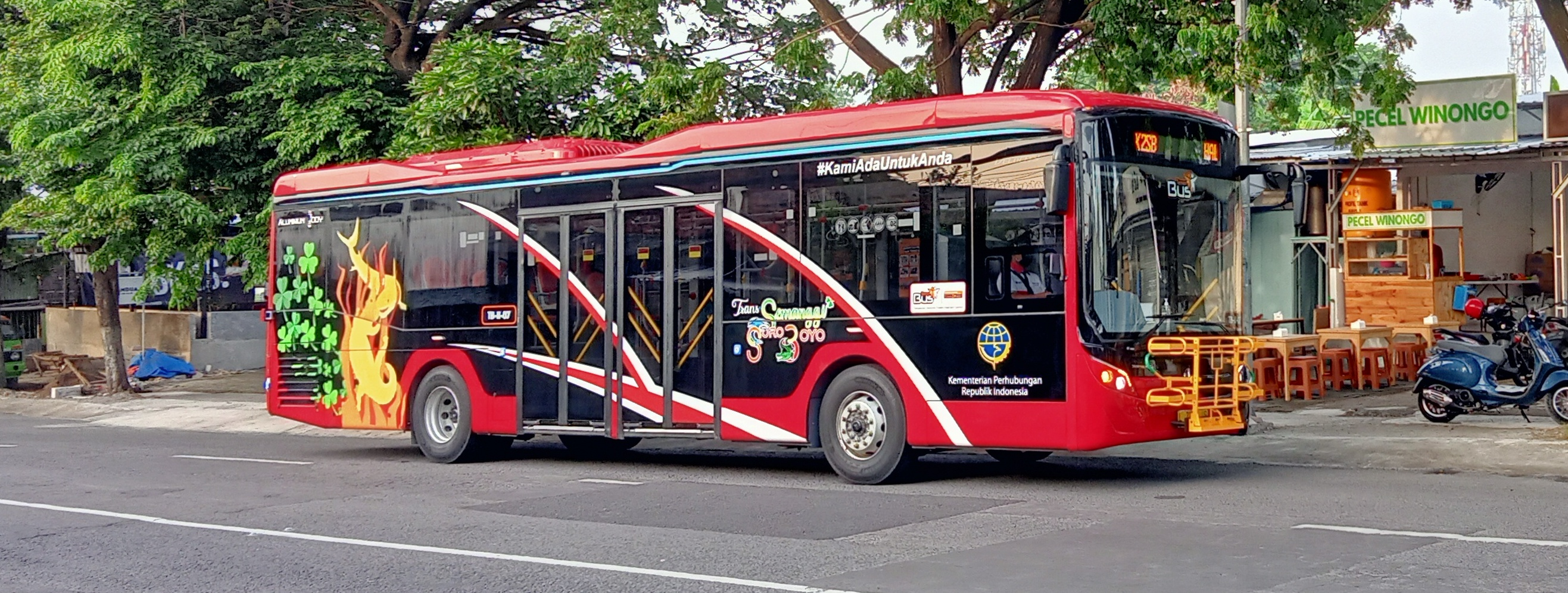
The Mercedes-Benz bus fleet that serves corridor K2L

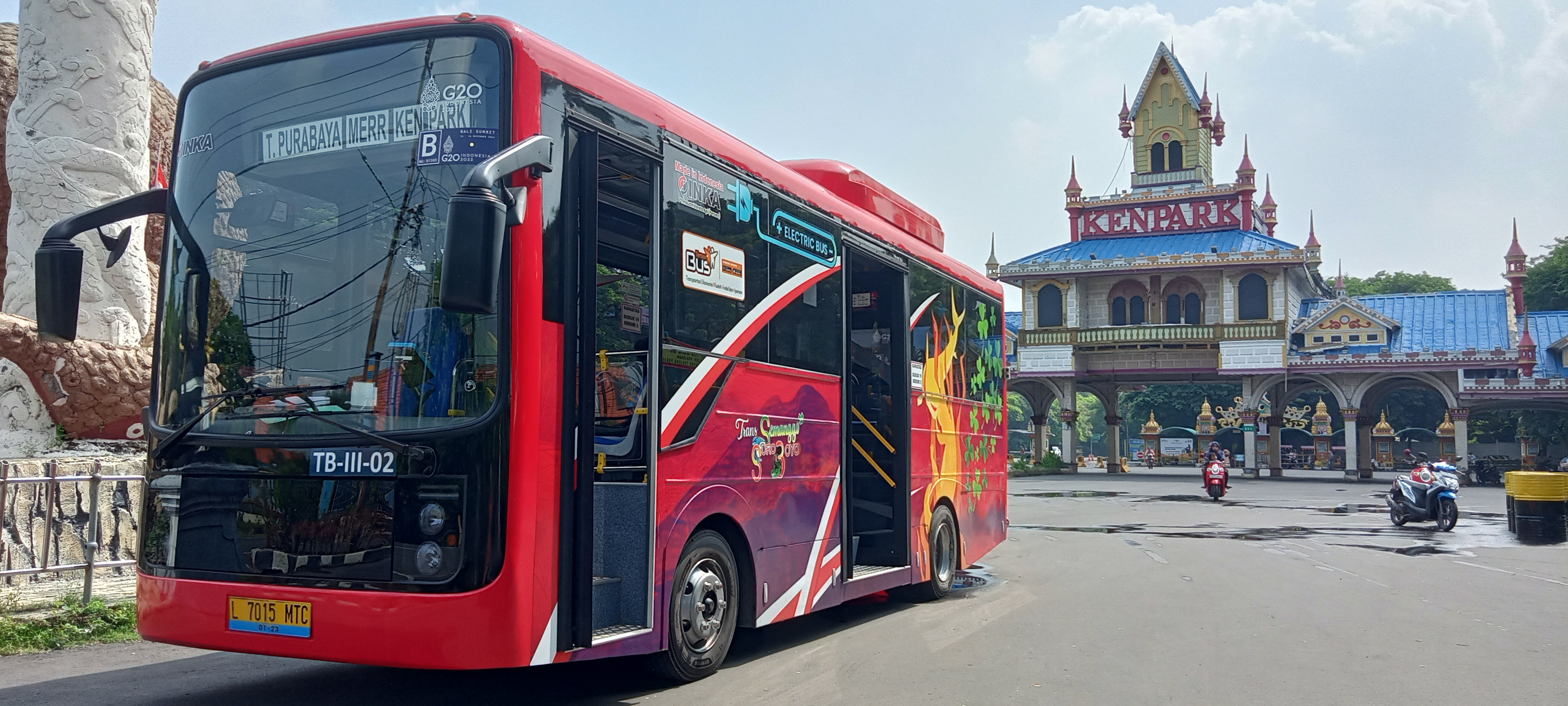
The INKA bus fleet that served corridor K3L until December 2024

The Trans Semanggi Suroboyo will be realized in six corridors between 2022 and 2024. These six corridors will reach most of the primary arterial roads in Surabaya's inner city. Four corridors have previously been served by the existing Suroboyo Bus, while the other two corridors are the new development of urban bus lines that reaches Pakal district Sepuluh Nopember Institute of Technology and Airlangga University campus areas.

Corridor	Route	Fleets	Operator	Began operation
K1L	Purabaya Bus Terminal–Tanjung Perak via Darmo	20	N/A	TBA
K2L	Lidah Wetan–Kejawan Putih Tambak	17	PT Seduluran Bus Suroboyo	1 February 2022 – 7 July 2023
K2L	Kejawan Putih Tambak–Unesa	17	PT Seduluran Bus Suroboyo	8 July 2023
K3L	Purabaya Bus Terminal–Kenjeran Park via ITS	17	INKA	25 February 2024-31 December 2024 14 January 2025
K3L	Gunung Anyar Timur–Kenjeran Park	5	N/A	TBA
K4L	GBT Stadium–Mastrip (Wiyung)	21	N/A	TBA
K5L	Benowo Bus Terminal–Tunjungan	19	N/A	TBA
K6L	Purabaya Bus Terminal–Campus C of Unair	19	N/A (implemented as Suroboyo Bus R4)	N/A (implemented as Suroboyo Bus R4)
