= PO Coyo =

Transportation company of Indonesia

PO. COYO PT.
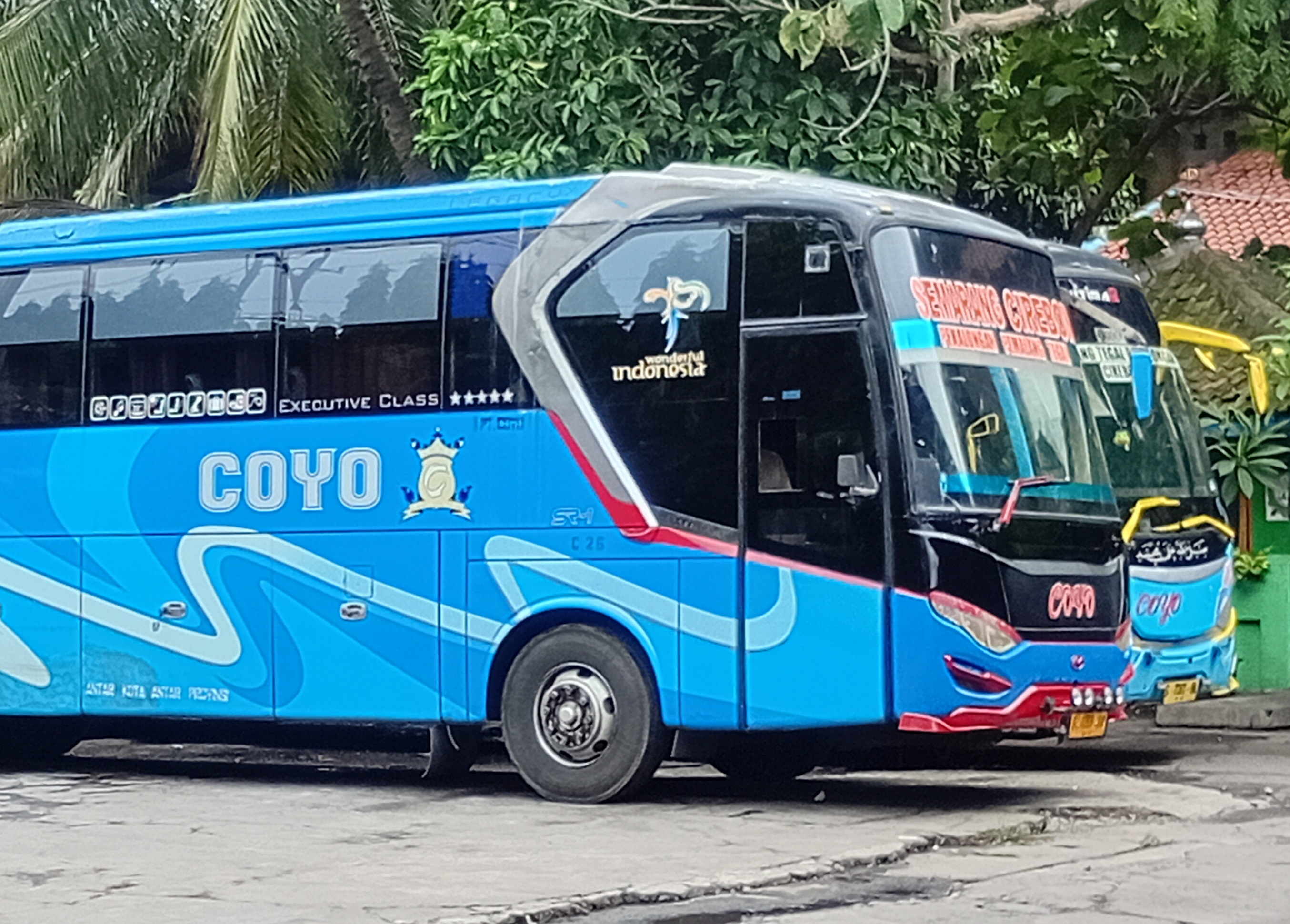
- The bus is parked in its garage, using a Legacy SR1 body from Laksana
- Founded: 1950
- Headquarters: Pekalongan, Central Java, Indonesia
- Service area: West Java, Central Java, East Java
- Service type: Bus AKAP
- Destinations: Malang, Surabaya, Cirebon
- Hubs: Tegal
- Lounge: Super executive & Executive
- Fuel type: Diesel fuel
- Chief executive: Charles Prasetyo Winoto

PO. COYO PT. or commonly called PO Coyo is one of the bus companies from Pekalongan, Central Java. The bus serves passengers from Semarang to Cirebon and also Cirebon to Malang. This company is one of the oldest bus companies in Indonesia.

== History ==
COYO, formerly named TJOJO, began operating around 1950 with the fleet at that time Ford. Had formed a bus route in Central Java routes. But for now the Coyo bus departure schedule is not as busy as before because of the lack of passengers and lost to other modes of transportation such as trains or private vehicles.

This company is also almost collapsed because there are no family members in Indonesia who want to continue the business of the owner. Until finally the owner's son who was in America was called Untung, to continue the business. According to the owner himself who said why no one wanted to continue this business, because the passenger transportation business needed large capital but the benefits gained were small and capital was returned. long.

== Routes and classes ==
PO Coyo currently serves routes in several cities on Java, with two classes of buses, including:

- Semarang, Tegal, Cirebon - Economy PATAS AC
- Cirebon, Surabaya, Malang - Super Executive seat configuration 2-1

== Fleet ==
PO Coyo currently has dozens of bus fleets, among them :

=== Current fleet ===
- Hino Motors
- Hyundai

=== Former fleet ===
- Ford
- Mercedes-Benz
- Mitsubishi
