= Pahala Kencana =

Transportation company of Indonesia

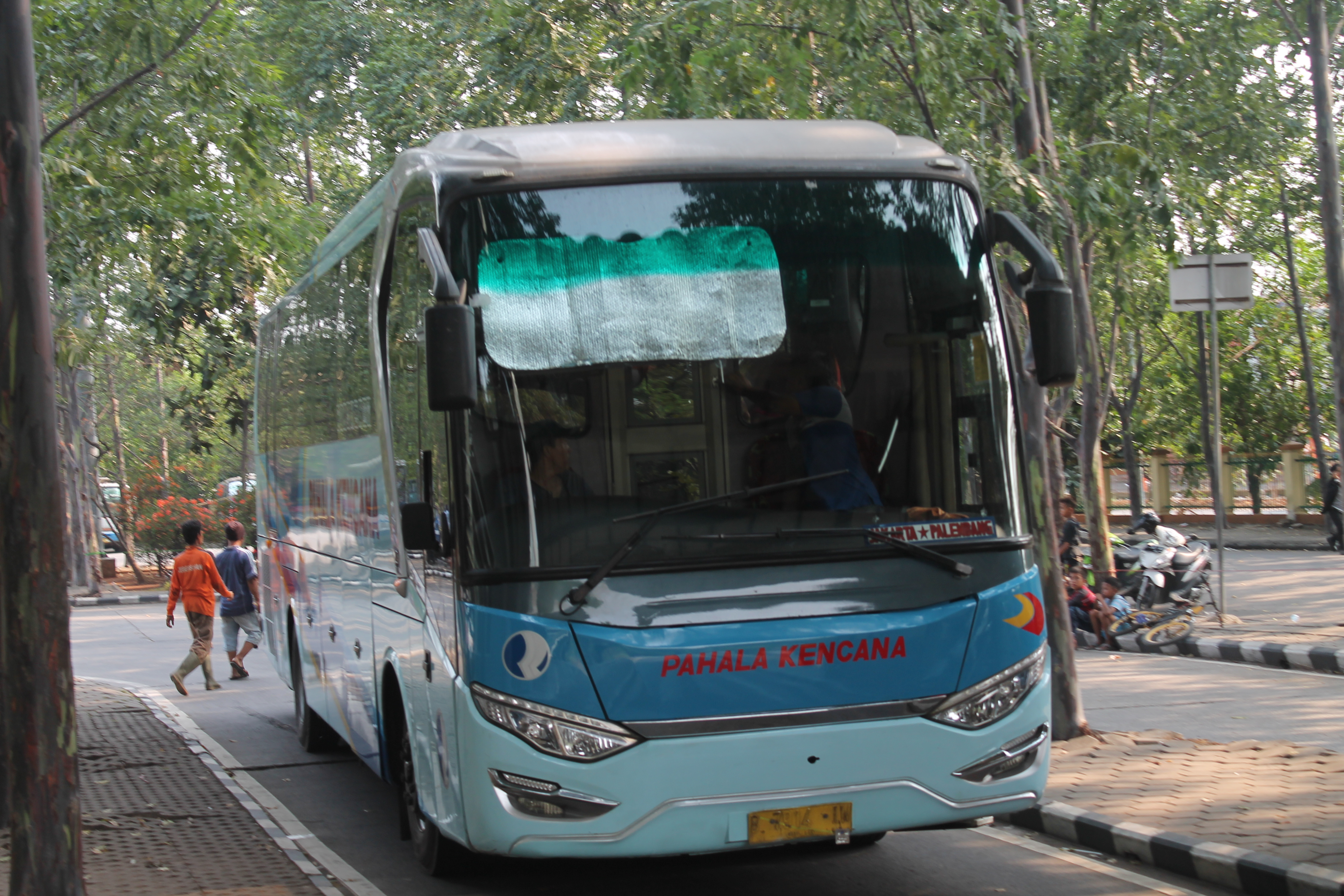
- Pahala Kencana Intercity Bus
- Founded: 1976
- Headquarters: Kelapa Gading, Jakarta Utara, DKI Jakarta
- Service area: Bali, Java, Sumatra
- Service type: Bus, Intercity bus
- Lounge: Executive & business
- Fuel type: Diesel fuel
- Chief executive: Bambang T. Tedjokusumo

PT. Pahala Kencana (established in Kudus, Central Java, 1976) is a transportation service company based in North Jakarta, Indonesia.

== History ==
Pahala Kencana started its business in 1976 serving from Jakarta to Kudus and Solo – Jakarta, vice versa. The dynamic situation of the business movement spurred Pahala Kencana to continue to expand its marketing operations area to reach several large and small cities in Sumatra, Java, Madura, Bali, and Lombok. In 1993, the Pahala Kencana Depository Services business was developed, which initially only served available operating destinations, relying on remaining luggage space, with a few smaller vehicles as modes for the "last mile" delivery. In the same year, PT BPW Pahala Kencana Travel Bureau which later became better known as Pahala Tours & Travel was established. In 1997, PK operated a number of city buses in Jakarta, and in 1998 Pahala Kencana resumed business by opening inter-city routes within the province (AKDP).

In 2000, PT Pahala Kencana began to expand into the field of tourism transportation which included the provision of tourism buses and rental vehicles under the Nirwana Luxury Tourist Bus brand. In the same year, Pahala Kencana moved its headquarters from Kudus, Central Java to Jakarta. Then in 2005, PT Pahala Kencana developed an airplane ticket sales business that concentrated on selling airline tickets at low rates by establishing PT Nata Tours.

== Intercity Services ==
Pahala Kencana operates Intercity bus routes.

=== Routes ===
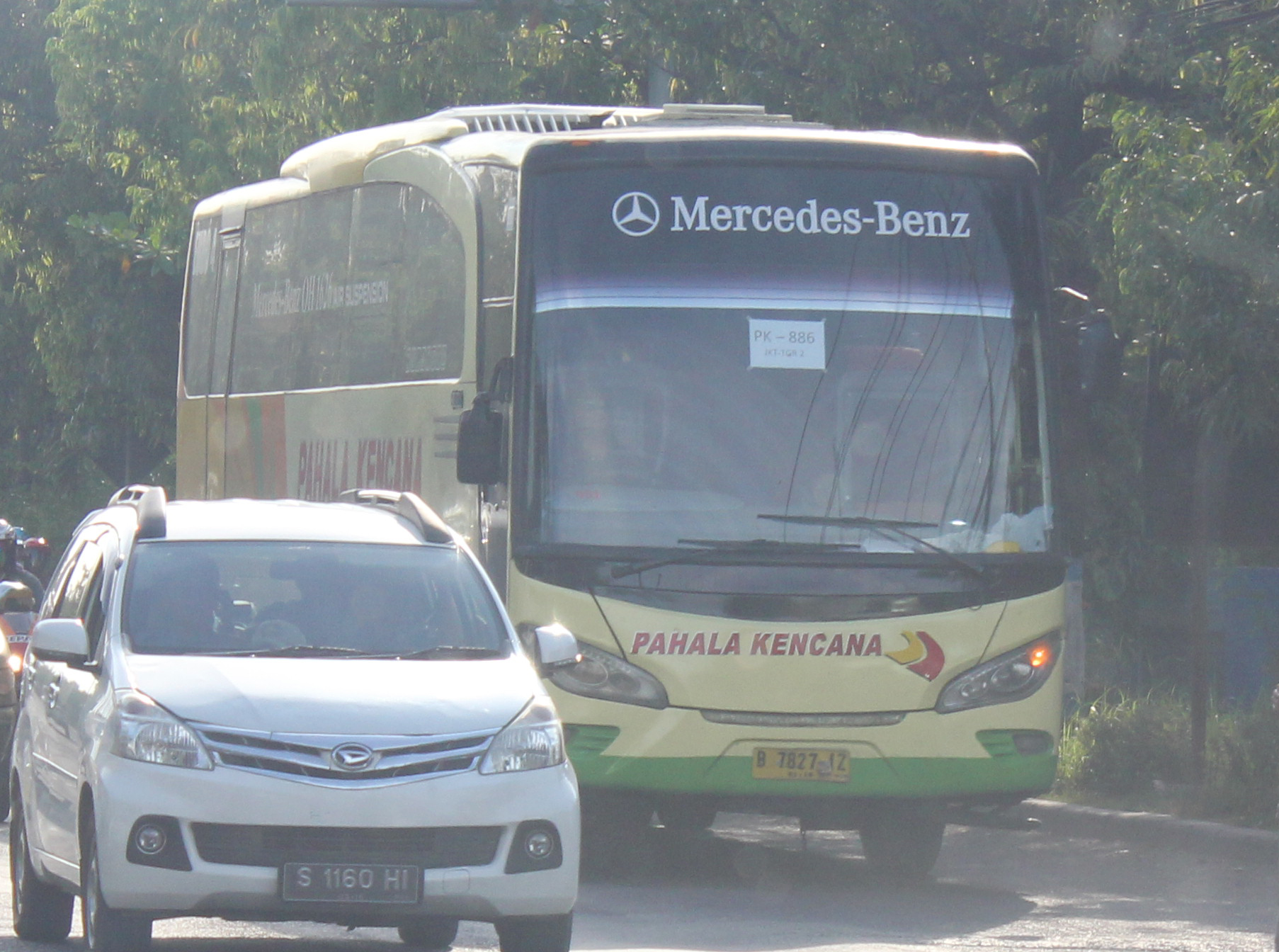
Pahala Kencana Intercity bus

Pahala Kencana currently serves more than 93 cities in Java, Bali, Sumatra with the frequency of the main route commuting 86 times. Some routes include:

- Jakarta – Sumenep
- Jakarta – Ponorogo
- Jakarta – Wonogiri
- Jakarta – Yogyakarta
- Jakarta – Banyuwangi
- Jakarta – Palembang
- Jakarta – Wonosobo
- Bandung – Bandarlampung
- Bandung – Denpasar
- Bandung – Palembang
- Bandung – Solo
- Bandung – Surabaya
- Bandung – Blitar
- Palembang – Solo
- Semarang – Denpasar
- Malang – Denpasar
- Surabaya – Jakarta
- Denpasar – Sumenep
- Denpasar – Yogyakarta

Nb: All routes are operated vice versa

=== Class ===
- Executive

The executive class has comfortable chair facilities with spacious rooms, audio-visual equipment, toilets, meals and snacks

- VIP

VIP class has comfortable chair facilities, audio-visual equipment, toilets, meals and snacks

- Business

Business class has comfortable chair facilities with wide spaces, audio-visual equipment, toilets

== City Bus Services ==
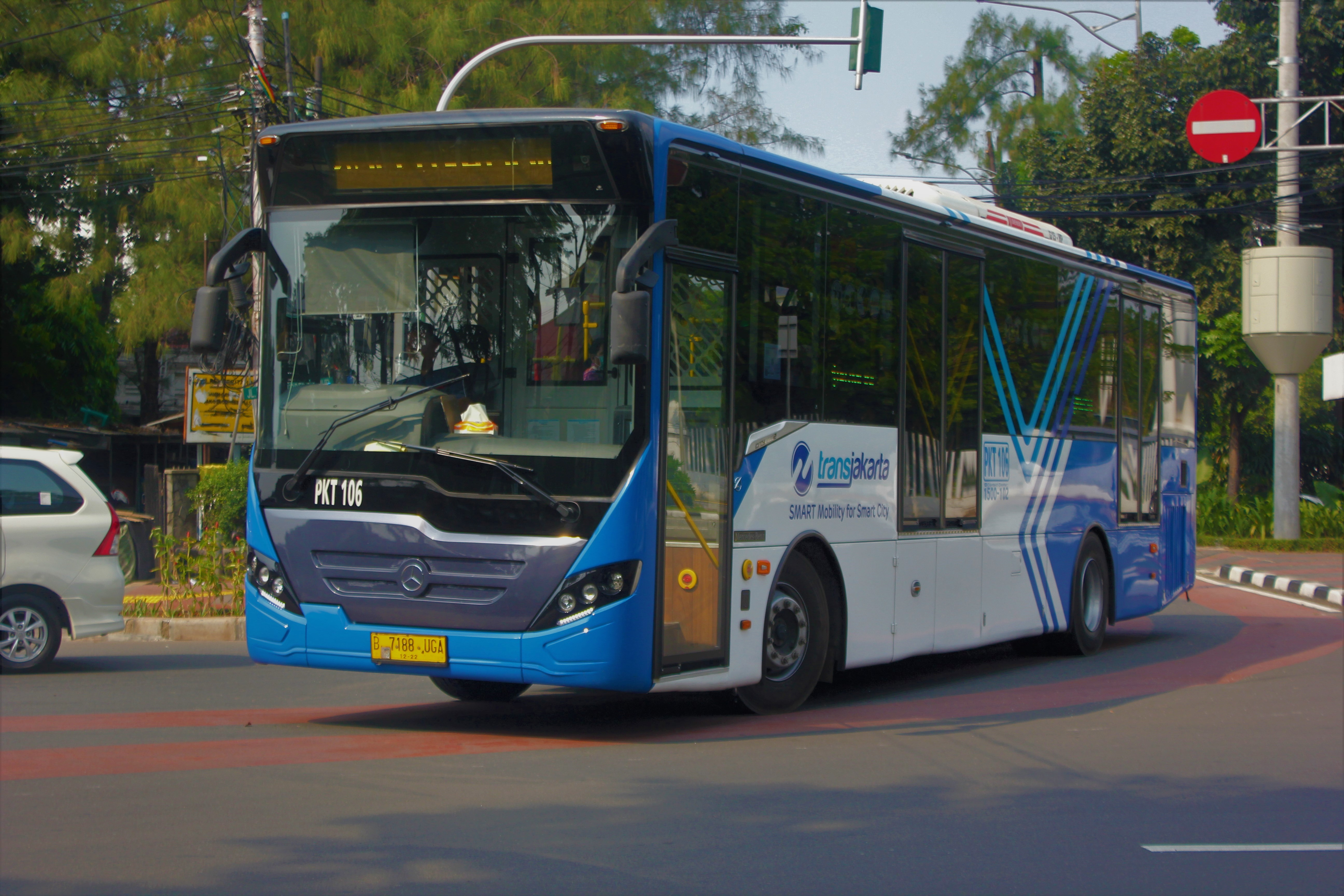
Transjakarta PKT 106 at Gambir

In January 2018, Pahala Kencana started to operate buses for TransJakarta. Pahala Kencana currently operates 15 Mercedes-Benz buses bodied by Laksana carroseries with the Cityline 2 body, as most for TransJakarta buses.

== Fleet ==
- Hino
- Mercedes-Benz
