= Express Group (Indonesia) =

Transportation company in Indonesia

PT Express Transindo Utama Tbk
- Trade name: Express Group
- Formerly: PT Kasih Bhakti Utama (1981 - 1991)
- Company type: Public company
- Traded as: IDX: TAXI
- Industry: Transportation
- Founded: 11 June 1981; 45 years ago
- Headquarters: Jakarta, Indonesia
- Area served: Indonesia
- Key people: Johannes Triatmojo (President Director and CEO); Abed Nego (Chief Commissioner)
- Brands: Express Taxi; Eagle Taxi; Eagle High
- Services: Taxi; Bus
- Revenue: Rp 7,263 billion (2021)
- Net income: Rp 188,639 billion (2021)
- Total assets: Rp 91,040 billion (2021)
- Total equity: Rp 76,068 billion (2021)
- Owner: Zico Trust (S) Pte Ltd (22,39%); UOB Kay Hian Pte Ltd (17,27%); PT Rajawali Corpora (10,70%); PT Asuransi Multi Artha Guna (5,53%)
- Number of employees: 44 (2021)
- Subsidiaries: See list
- Website: www.expressgroup.co.id

PT Express Transindo Utama Tbk (doing business under the name Express Group) is an Indonesian ground transportation company headquartered in Jakarta. Until the end of 2021, this company operates 130 taxi units and 40 bus units in Jadetabek (Greater Jakarta). Express Group is also the second largest taxi company in Indonesia after Blue Bird Group.

== History ==
The company began its history in 1981 as a trading and distribution firm under the name "PT Kasih Bhakti Utama." In 1991, it changed its name to its current title and shifted its focus to land transportation. In 2002, the company implemented a partnership scheme that allows drivers to operate one unit of the company's vehicle for five to seven years, after which the vehicle can belong to the driver. In 2010, the company began offering premium taxi services, and in 2012, it was officially listed on the Indonesia Stock Exchange. In 2021, the company is holding a second private placement.

== Subsidiaries ==
Until the end of 2021, this company has 16 subsidiaries, namely:

1. PT Wahyu Mustika Kinasih, engages in the taxation sector in Tangerang City, Banten
2. PT Semesta Indoprima, engages in the taxation sector in West Jakarta, Special Capital Region of Jakarta
3. PT Tulus Sinar Selatan, engages in the taxation sector in South Jakarta, Special Capital Region of Jakarta
4. PT Mutiara Express Perdana, engages in the taxation sector in Bekasi City, West Java
5. PT Fajar Mutiara Timur, engages in the taxation sector in South Tangerang, Banten
6. PT Express Kencana Lestari, engages in the taxation sector in Depok, West Java
7. PT Ekspres Sarana Batu Ceper, engages in the taxation sector in Bekasi City, West Java
8. PT Ekspres Mulia Kencana, engages in the taxation sector in Bekasi City, West Java
9. PT Indo Semesta Luhur, engages in the taxation sector in Surabaya, East Java
10. PT Express Kartika Perdana, engages in the taxation sector in Surabaya, East Java
11. PT Express Limo Nusantara, engages in the taxation sector in Medan, North Sumatra
12. PT Satria Express Perdana, engages in the taxation sector in Semarang, Central Java
13. PT Express Sabana Utama, engages in the taxation sector in Padang, West Sumatra
14. PT Lendang Karun, engages in the taxation sector in Mataram, West Nusa Tenggara
15. PT Express Jakarta Jaya, engages in Jakarta
16. PT Mutiara Kencana Sejahtera, engages in Jakarta

== See also ==
- Blue Bird Group
