= Naikilah Perusahaan Minang =

Indonesian autobus company

PT Naikilah Perusahaan Minang
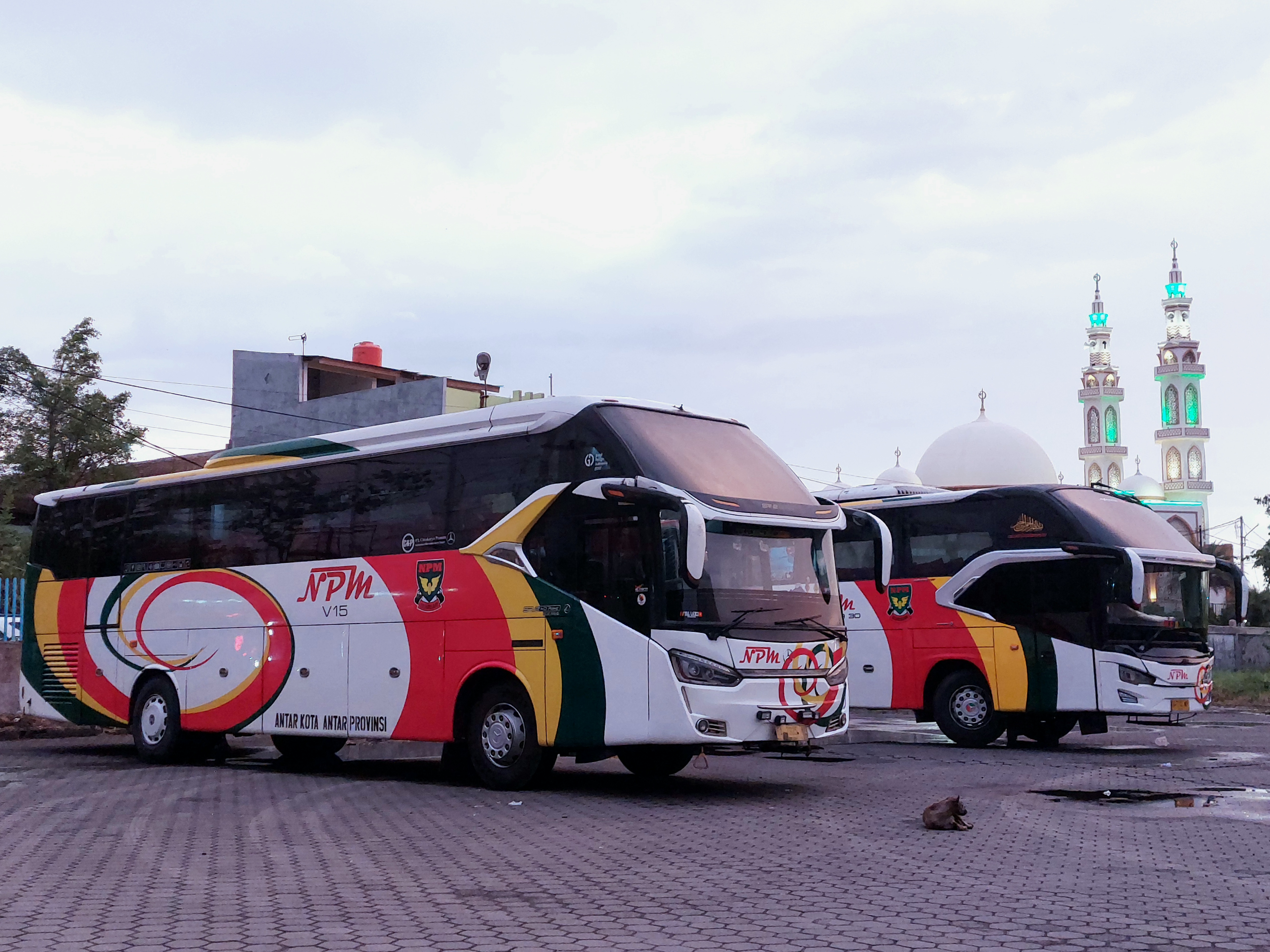
- NPM buses in Padang
- Founded: 1 November 1937
- Headquarters: Padang Panjang, West Sumatra
- Fleet: ~80
- Chief executive: Angga Vircansa Chairul
- Website: www.busnpm.com

PT Naikilah Perusahaan Minang (lit. "Take the Minang Company Limited"), abbreviated as NPM, is an Indonesian autobus company based in Padang Panjang, West Sumatra. Founded in 1937, it is the oldest operating autobus company in Indonesia.

== History ==
The firm was founded on 1 November 1937 by Bahauddin Sutan Barbangso Nan Kuniang as a joint venture with several Chinese Indonesian businessmen in Padang Panjang. It was chartered in 1948. Bahauddin had previously engaged in the transportation business and operated dogcarts. In its first decades, the company only served routes between cities and towns in West Sumatra, before later expanding to other cities in Sumatra and later to Java in the 1980s.

At its peak, the company operated over 100 buses, its Bukittinggi–Padang route being particularly important to the firm's business. During the 1990s and 2000s, the decline in business due to the Asian financial crisis and competition from air travel forced the company to downsize, until it operated just 27 buses in 2009. It briefly ceased operations during the COVID-19 pandemic in Indonesia due to a collapse in passenger numbers. As of 2021, it was the oldest autobus company still operating in Indonesia, being run by the third generation of the founder's family.

== Fleet and routes ==
As of 2022, the company operates 80 buses serving routes such as Padang–Jakarta and Padang–Medan, with 275 employees. NPM's routes link West Sumatra with other cities in Sumatra and Java, with the longest route being Bukittinggi–Bandung and the shortest being Bukittinggi–Padang. For passengers heading to Central Java and East Java, the company has transfer agreements with other autobus companies.
