= Suroboyo Bus =

Bus system in Surabaya, Indonesia

- Logo of Suroboyo Bus

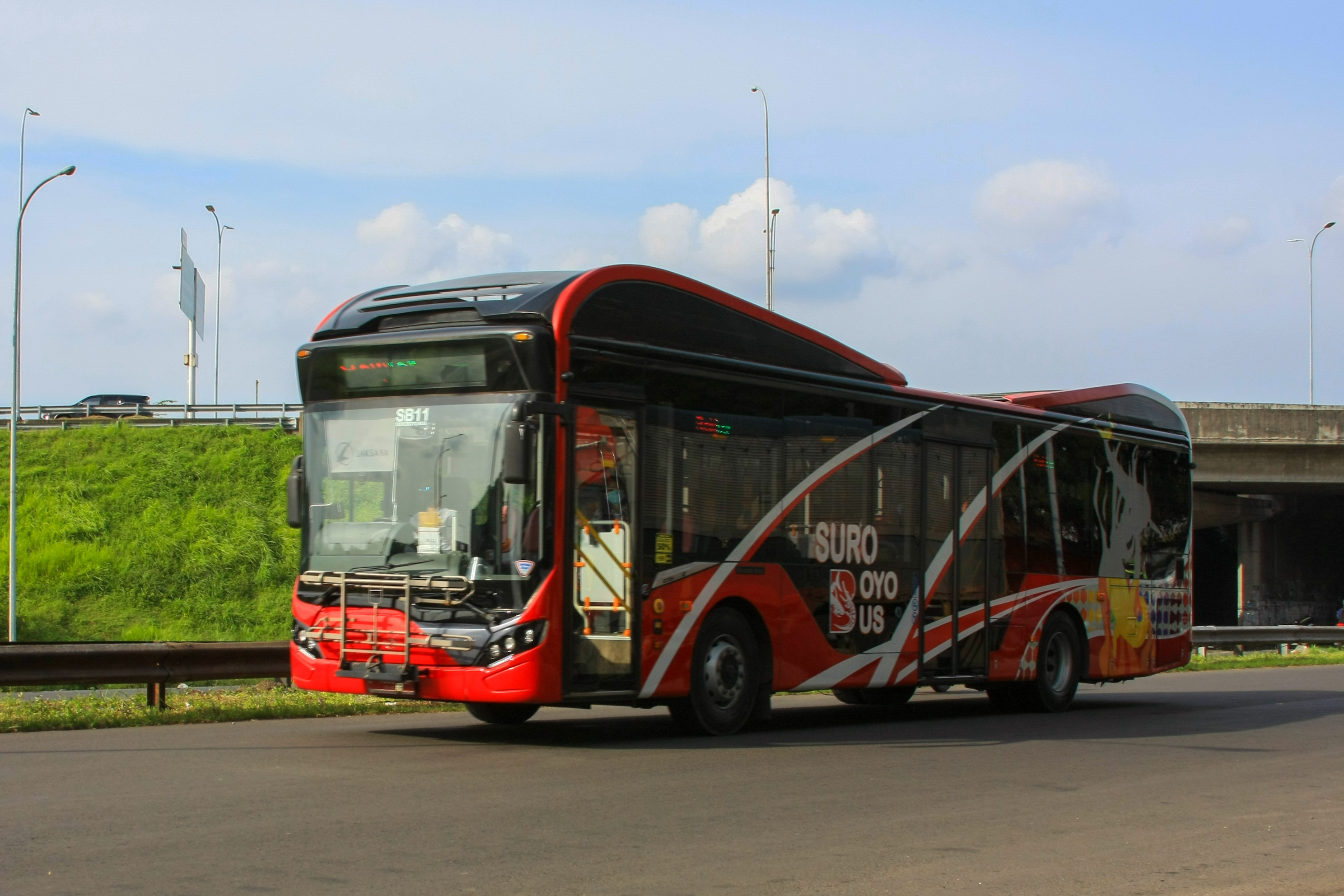
- A Suroboyo Bus fleet

Overview
- Owner: Government of Surabaya
- Area served: Greater Surabaya
- Locale: Surabaya, Indonesia
- Transit type: Bus rapid transit
- Number of lines: 4 Corridors
- Headquarters: Park and Ride Mayjen Sungkono, Gunungsari, Dukuh Pakis, Surabaya, East Java

Operation
- Began operation: 7 April 2018; 8 years ago
- Operators: Public Transport Management Unit, Government of Surabaya

Suroboyo Bus, abbreviated SB, is a Transit bus system in Surabaya, East Java, Indonesia. Suroboyo Bus was launched on 7 April 2018 under the former mayor Tri Rismaharini. Suroboyo Bus can be tracked live on the GOBIS app, as well as the MitraDarat app by the Ministry of Transport.

== Routes ==
Suroboyo Bus route map

Currently, Suroboyo Bus operates 4 routes:

- R1 - Purabaya - Perak

- R2 - UNESA - ITS - Kejawan Putih Tambak
- R4 - Purabaya - UNAIR C - ITS
- R5 - Benowo - Tunjungan

== Fleet ==
- R1: 28 units

(SB01-18) 18 units Laksana CityLine 2 built on Mercedes chassis (2018)

(SB19-26) 8 units Laksana CityLine 3 built on Scania chassis (2020)

(SB77-78) 2 units Laksana Nucleus 6 built on Mitsubishi Fuso chassis (2026)

- R2: 17 units

(SB59-75) 17 units Tentrem New Velocity W5 Lowdeck built on Mercedes chassis (2021)

- R4: 16 units

(SB27) 1 unit Skywell (2024)

(SB28-38) 11 units Laksana E-Nucleus 5 built on Hyundai chassis (2024)

(SB56-58, 76) 4 units Laksana Nucleus 6 built on Mitsubishi Fuso chassis (2026)

- R5: 17 units

(SB39-55) 17 units Laksana Nucleus 6 built on Mitsubishi Fuso chassis (2025)

== Operating hours and Payment ==
Suroboyo Bus operating hours range from 05.30–21.30 WIB.

Currently, Suroboyo Bus accepts payment via QRIS, electronic payment cards, as well as via the GOBIS app. Payment via plastic bottles are still accepted, however plastic bottles must be exchanged at specific drop-off points, which can then be exchanged for points within the GOBIS app.

== Incidents ==
During the August 2025 Indonesian protests, Suroboyo Bus R1 experienced interruptions in service patterns on 29 August, with service concluding prematurely at 20.35 WIB. Interruptions continued into 30 August, where R1 bypassed stops affected by protests.

== See also ==
- City bus in Surabaya
- List of bus operator companies in Indonesia
- Transportation in Indonesia
- Transport in Jakarta
