= Purabaya Bus Terminal =

Bus station in East Java, Indonesia

Purabaya Bus Terminal Terminal Purabaya/Terminal Bungurasih
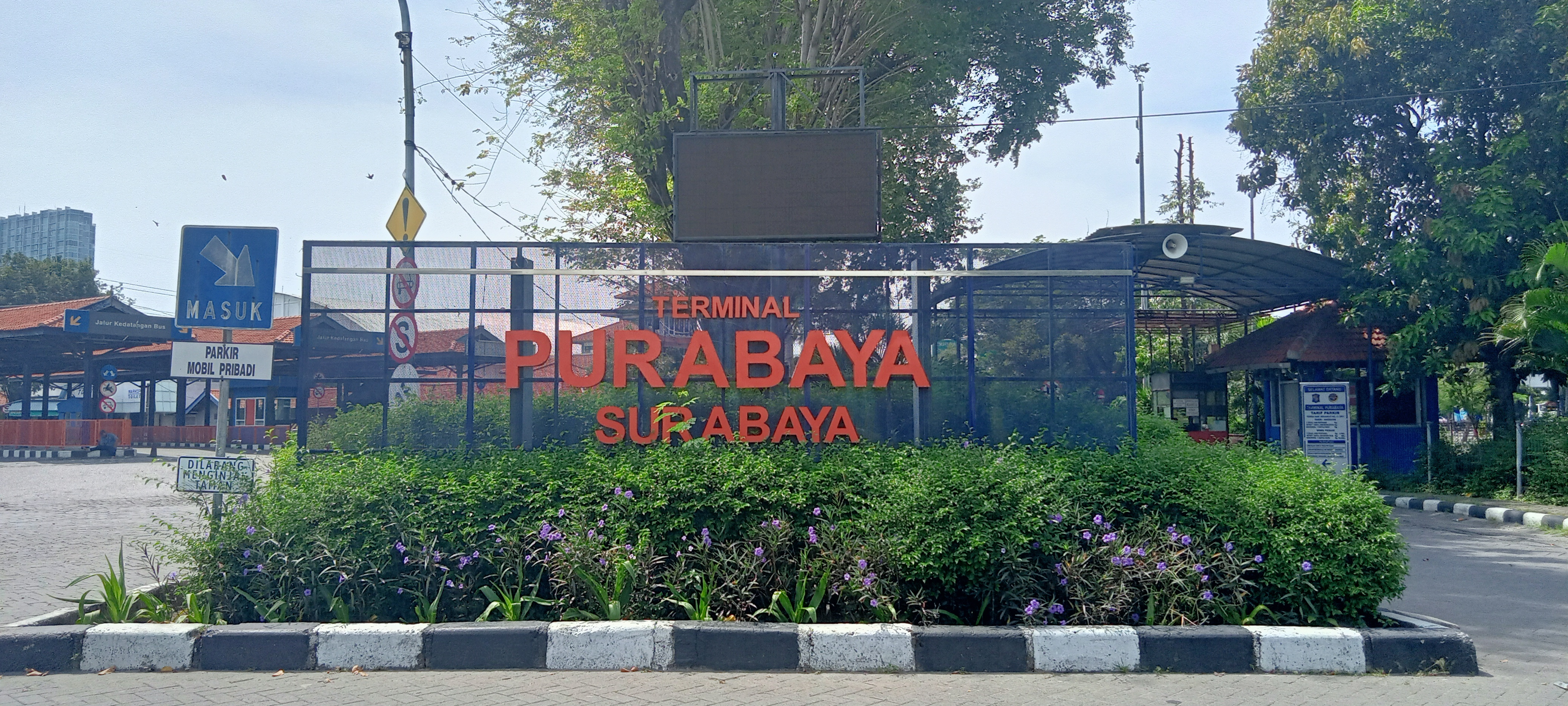

General information
- Location: Jl. Letjen Sutoyo, Bungurasih, Waru, Sidoarjo Regency, East Java; Indonesia
- Coordinates: 07°21′04″S 112°43′28″E
- System: Bus terminal
- Owner: Ministry of Transportation

History
- Opened: March 11, 1991; 35 years ago
Location

Purabaya Bus Terminal (Indonesian: Terminal Purabaya), or Bungurasih Bus Terminal, is a type-A bus terminal serving bus services in Greater Surabaya area of Indonesia. It is located in the outskirts of Surabaya; in Bungurasih, Waru, Sidoarjo Regency, East Java. It serves local and inter-island routes.
