= Trans Metro Dewata =

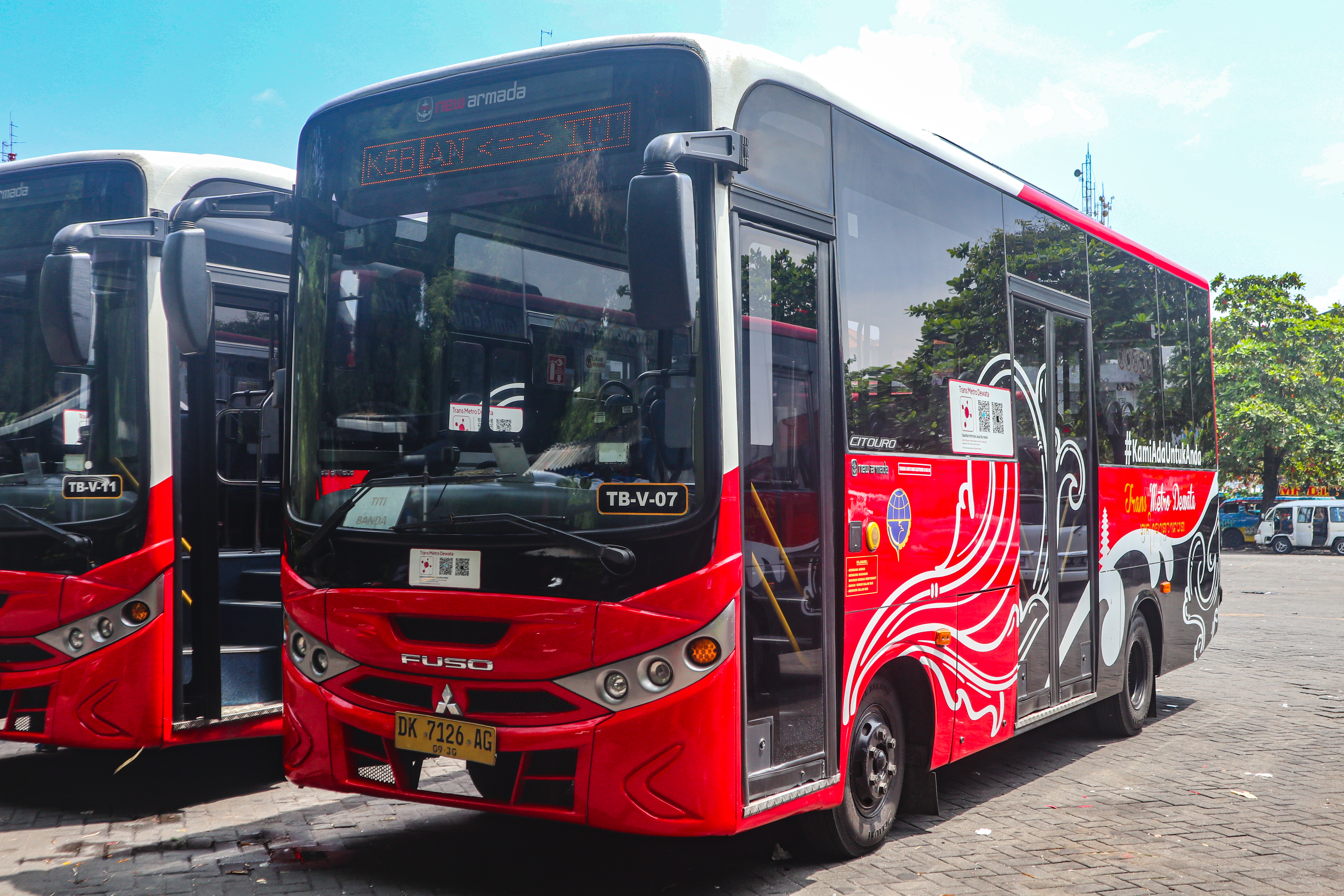
- A Trans Metro Dewata bus

Overview
- Owner: Government of Bali
- Area served: Sarbagita (Denpasar metropolitan area)
- Locale: Denpasar, Indonesia
- Transit type: Bus rapid transit
- Number of lines: 6
- Website: bali.trans.my.id

Operation
- Began operation: 7 September 2020; 6 years ago 20 April 2025; 18 months ago (reactivation)
- Operator: PT Satria Trans Jaya

Trans Metro Dewata is a bus transportation system that operated from September 7, 2020, to December 31, 2024, and was reactivated on April 20, 2025, in the Denpasar metropolitan area of Bali.

== History ==
Trans Metro Dewata was inaugurated by the Governor of Bali I Wayan Koster and the Director General of Land Transportation of the Ministry of Transportation Budi Setiyadi on September 7, 2020, at Badung Market, Denpasar. Trans Metro Dewata routes are spread across the areas of Denpasar, Badung, Gianyar, and Tabanan. A total of 105 buses serve the six Trans Metro Dewata routes. The Trans Metro Dewata service operator is PT Satria Trans Jaya.

Trans Metro Dewata operations were temporarily suspended until from December 31, 2024, to April 20, 2025, due to funding and organisational problems in the transfer of the service from the national government to the Balinese government. Compared to before the suspension of services, in 2025 there are fewer services with a greater interval between buses on all six routes. Timetables and information are available on the MitraDarat app. Depending on route, the first service of the day departs between 04:30 and 05:00 and the final service of the day departs between 18:30 and 19:00. Buses come every 15–20 minutes as of 2026.

== Fares ==
Adult fares are Rp 4,400 per trip, paid by scanning a QR code for the QRIS cashless payment system. This system, where passengers show their digital payment receipt to the driver after scanning the code, is commonly circumvented by passengers as of 2025 as drivers do not have the time to check each passenger's payment receipt. Additional ticket checks and changes to the system to produce an audible tone indicating payment were scheduled to be introduced.

== Route map ==
Public transport network in Greater Denpasar as of March 2026
