= Pasuruan–Kalisat–Banyuwangi railway =

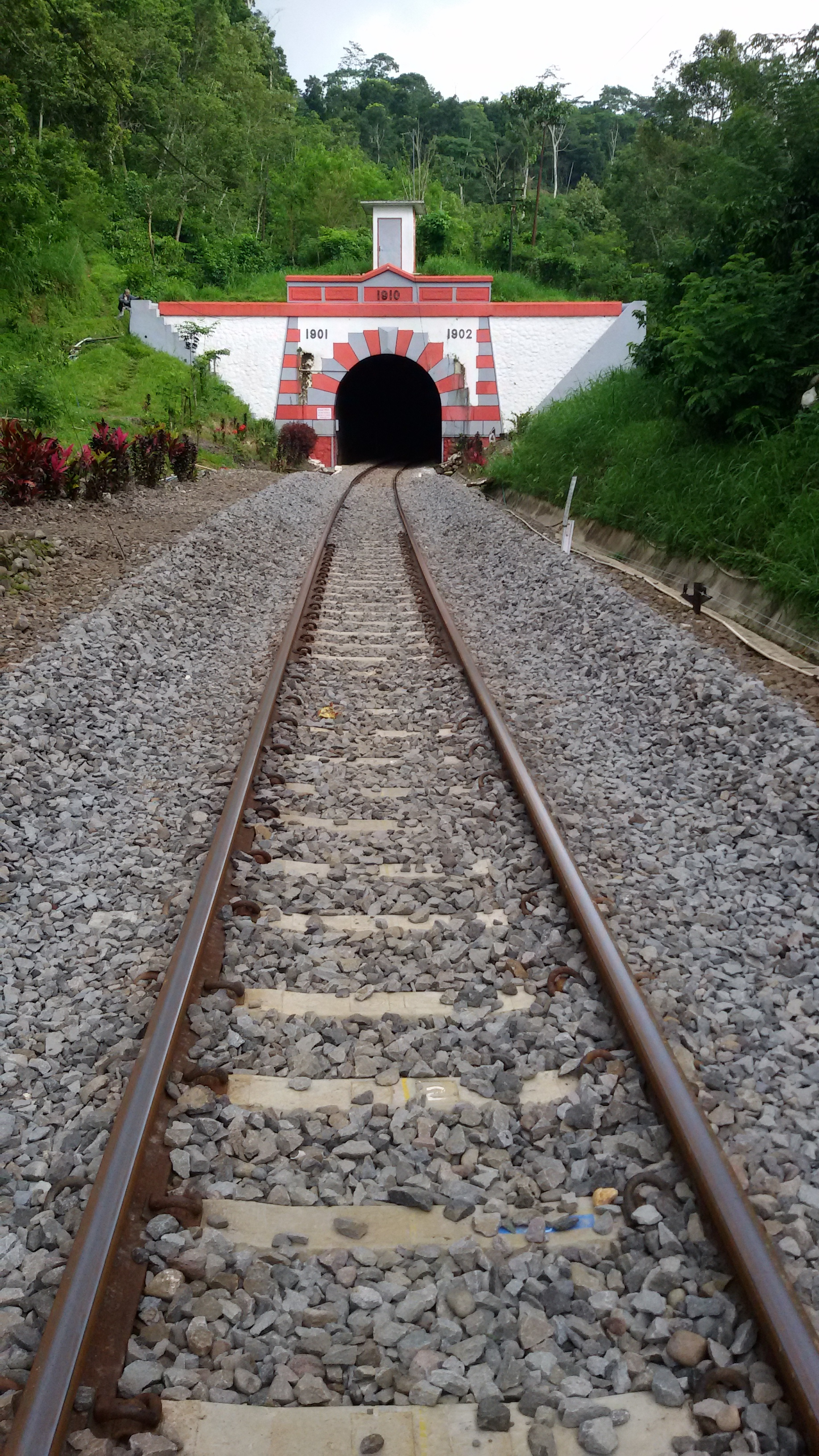
- Views of the Mrawan railway tunnel, 2015

Overview
- Native name: Jalur kereta api Pasuruan–Kalisat–Banyuwangi
- Status: Operational
- Owner: Directorate General of Railways (DJKA)
- Locale: Pasuruan-Banyuwangi, East Java
- Termini: Pasuruan; Ketapang
- Stations: 37

Service
- Type: Inter-city rail
- Operator(s): PT Kereta Api Indonesia

History
- Opened: 1878-1903

Technical
- Number of tracks: 1
- Track gauge: 1,067 mm (3 ft 6 in)
- Electrification: not available

Pasuruan–Kalisat–Ketapang railway is a railway line that connecting between Pasuruan and Ketapang, Banyuwangi via Jember and Kalisat. This line include in Operational IX Jember in around railway line, also have a railway tunnel, like the Mrawan railway tunnel and Garahan railway tunnel.

== History ==
=== Pasuruan–Kalisat segment ===
Before retiring on 15 November 1880, Maarschalk personally surveyed plans for an extension of the line to Probolinggo Station to connect it to Tanjung Tembaga Harbor. The proposed construction was approved on 11 December 1881. On 3 May 1884, the SS completed construction of the Pasuruan–Probolinggo line.

Based on Staatsblad Number 214 published on 23 June 1893, Staatsspoorwegen again expanded the network by building the Probolinggo–Jember–Panarukan railway line. The 34-kilometer Probolinggo–Klakah segment was completed on 1 July 1895. On 1 June 1897, the 62-kilometer Klakah–Jember line was completed. The final segment, namely Jember–Kalisat to Panarukan along with its branch lines, was operational on 1 October 1897.

=== Kalisat–Ketapang segment ===
The difficulty of transporting agricultural products from the Banyuwangi region, which is an isolated area and surrounded by steep hills that can't be traversed by village roads or cart paths, has resulted in Staatsspoorwegen (SS) offering trains as a solution for transporting agricultural products from this region. The Government support the plan was implemented with the publication of the General Plan for Railways on Java Island on 12 October 1893. The Kalisat–Banyuwangi railway line was one of the priorities in the plan.

Right after the construction of the Kalisat–Panarukan railway line, in 1897, the line to Banyuwangi was built. On 31 December 1898, the government issued a regulation that became the basis for the construction of this line. This route was built through the mountains, crossing two tunnels, and has a fairly deep bridge in the Garahan–Mrawan section. On 10 December 1902, the 30-kilometer segment from Kalisat to the Mrawan Tunnel was completed. The line to Banyuwangi was then completed on 2 February 1903, marking the full opening of the line to public service by the SS.

Although the operation of this line is now a "main line", this line was originally built by the SS as a branch/junction line (zijtak) because the main line of the eastern railway network was the Kalisat–Panarukan which was actually operationally changed the other way around. At the beginning of its operation, precisely on 27 February 1908, an earthquake struck Gumitir Mountains and Banyuwangi. As a result, a landslide occurred in the Mrawan railway tunnel, but it did not cause the hole in the tunnel to collapse. This allowed repairs to be carried out at the earliest up to five days later.

Once the line opened, 3,000 families decided to settle along the tracks. This demonstrates the importance of the railway as an economic driver at that time.

== Construction of the new Ketapang railway and closure of the Kabat–Banyuwangi Lama segment ==
On 7 September 1985, A new railway line has been completed by PJKA from Kabat to Ketapang, resulting in a gradual decline in traffic on the segment to Banyuwangi Lama. In addition to serving passengers, the railway line was also built to support the operations of the Pupuk Sriwidjaja (Pusri) warehouse in the Meneng Harbor area.

The segment to Old Banyuwangi was officially closed on 31 March 1988. Since the 90s, this line has not been operated anymore because it was replaced by a new line from Kabat to Ketapang which has quite close access to Ketapang Port (and even closer to cross to Bali than Boom Port).

The condition of the railway line varies from one area to another. Kabat is no longer in use and all that can be seen is a roofless building overgrown with weeds. Banyuwangi Lama is also no longer in use and is now a shopping complex, but the original architecture of this station is still maintained. The line that passes through the village of Kedayunan still exists although only the rail iron and the sleepers have been lost. In the Kalirejo Permai housing complex, these rail irons have been removed for sale, some houses even have fences made from old railway tracks. The railway crossing on Jalan S. Parman now has a police post built on it. Jalan Kepiting in Kelurahan Sobo is a new highway built shortly after the railway was no longer in use, on the right and left sides of Jalan Kepiting there are rusty iron poles that were probably once blue and white, a sign that a railway once existed there. Residential settlements and shopping complexes were built on this defunct railway from Kertosari to Karangrejo. Several manual crossing barriers also still exist, such as those on the railway that crosses Jalan Ikan Sadar, Karangrejo. Several former industrial buildings and factories are also found near the railway, indicating that there was once industrial activity that utilized trains. One of the most famous factories is the Naga Bulan factory, a copra oil processing company. Remnants of the railway can still be traced all the way to Boom Beach, but the turntable that once stood at the end of the railway has disappeared.

The construction of a permanent structure on the dead Kabat-Banyuwangi track violates Law No. 23 of 2007 concerning Railways, which states that land assets around railway tracks belong to the state and cannot be owned by private individuals. This was further explained by Gatut Setyatmok, Head of PT KAI Operations Region IX Jember. Consequently, the permanent structure must be prepared for demolition at any time without compensation.

== Service ==
Here's train that passing the Pasuruan-Ketapang railway line:

- Pandalungan, between Gambir and Jember
- Sri Tanjung, between Lempuyangan and Ketapang
- Blambangan Express, between Pasar Senen and Ketapang
- Wijayakusuma, between Cilacap and Ketapang
- Logawa, between Purwokerto and Ketapang (via Surabaya Gubeng)
- Ijen Express, between Malang and Ketapang
- Mutiara Timur, between Surabaya Pasar Turi
- Probowangi, between Surabaya Gubeng and Ketapang
- Tawang Alun, between Malang Kotalama and Ketapang
- Ranggajati, between Cirebon and Jember
- Pandanwangi, between Jember and Ketapang
- Sangkuriang train, between Bandung and Ketapang

== See also ==
- Wonokromo–Bangil–Pasuruan railway
