= Garahan railway tunnel =

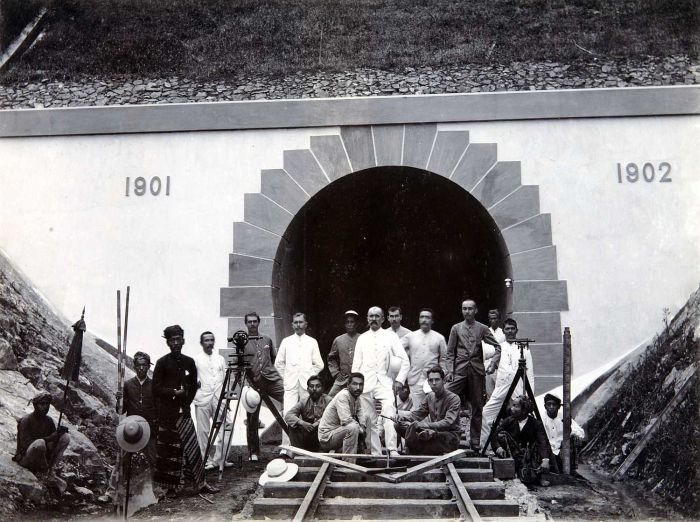
- Photo of the Garahan railway tunnel circa 1902, after completion by the Staatsspoorwegen.
- Interactive map of Garahan railway tunnel

Overview
- Location: Garahan, Silo, Jember Regency, East Java
- Status: Active
- Route: Jember - Banyuwangi
- Crosses: Jember-Banyuwangi railway line
- Start: km 25+493
- End: km 25+606
- No. of stations: Garahan

Operation
- Work began: 1901
- Constructed: 1901-1902
- Opened: 1902
- Owner: Kereta Api Indonesia

Technical
- Length: 113 m (371 ft)
- Track gauge: 1067 mm

The Garahan railway tunnel is a railway tunnel located near with Garahan in Garahan, Silo, Jember Regency, East Java. The tunnel started construction in 1901 and was complated 1902 by Staatsspoorwegen (SS), the Dutch East Indies railway company, with a length of 113 m. To the southeast of it, there is the Mrawan railway tunnel.

== History ==
In 1901, the Staatsspoorwegen began building the Garahan and Mrawan railway tunnels. The Garahan tunnel was completed and opened in 1902.

In January 2025, PT KAI will trial the New Generation stainless steel that produce from the PT INKA of the Logawa for extended to Ketapang as a preparation for the enactment of new train travel chart 2025 will effect on 1 February 2025. However, the new generation stainless steel of the Logawa train were stuck in the Garahan railway tunnel as a result, the Logawa train finally downgraded to stainless steel train sets produced in 2018.

== Service ==
Below is a list of trains that go through the Garahan railway tunnel:

- Sri Tanjung, between Lempuyangan and Ketapang
- Blambangan Express, between Pasar Senen and Ketapang
- Wijayakusuma, between Cilacap and Ketapang
- Logawa, between Purwokerto and Ketapang (via Surabaya Gubeng)
- Ijen Express, between Malang and Ketapang
- Mutiara Timur, between Surabaya Pasar Turi
- Probowangi, between Surabaya Gubeng and Ketapang
- Tawang Alun, between Malang Kotalama and Ketapang
- Pandanwangi, between Jember and Ketapang
- Sangkuriang train, between Bandung and Ketapang

== See also ==
- Pasuruan–Kalisat–Banyuwangi railway
