= Mrawan railway tunnel =

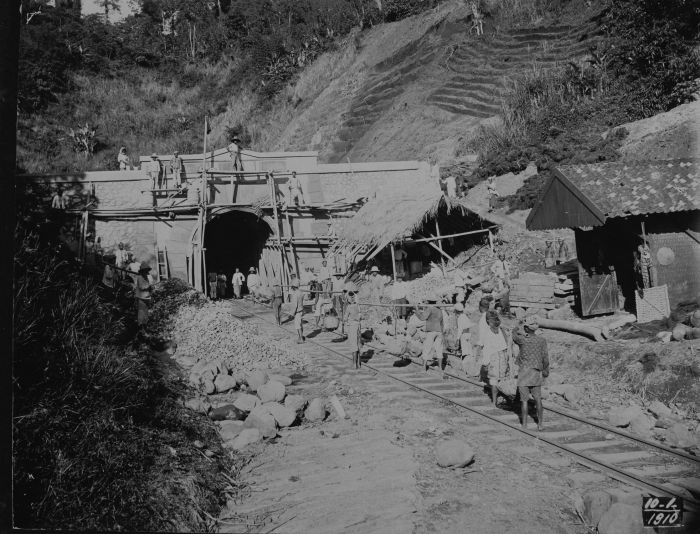
- Mrawan railway tunnel is under construction and finishing phase
- Interactive map of Mrawan railway tunnel

Overview
- Location: Sidomulyo, Silo, Jember Regency, East Java
- Status: active
- Route: Jember – Banyuwangi
- Crosses: Jember-Banyuwangi railway line
- Start: Mrawan
- End: Kali Baru
- No. of stations: Mrawan

Operation
- Work began: 1901
- Constructed: 1901–1902
- Opens: 1910
- Owner: Kereta Api Indonesia

Technical
- Length: 690 m (2,260 ft)
- Track gauge: 1067 mm

Mrawan railway tunnel is a railway tunnel that located northwest of Mrawan, Sidomulyo, Silo, Jember Regency, East Java. This tunnel was built in 1901–1902 and completed in 1910 by the Staatsspoorwegen, the Dutch East Indies railway company, with a length of 690 m. The Garahan railway tunnel is to the northwest.

== Geography ==
The tunnel is located close to Mrawan and the Gumitir tourist area.

== History ==
This tunnel penetrates Mount Gumitir which borders Jember Regency with Banyuwangi Regency. When this tunnel was built, the first parts to be built were the left and right walls in 1901–1902, then continued with the construction of the railway tunnel's closing arch which took about eight years, until it was completed in 1910.

== Manager ==
This railway tunnel is managed by Jember Operations Area IX and guarded by tunnel guard officers (PJTW) based at Mrawan Station, located not far from this tunnel. The name Mrawan comes from the river that flows near the station complex and this tunnel. The architecture of this tunnel is similar to the Sasaksaat railway tunnel in Cipatat, West Bandung Regency.

== Technical data ==
BH – 152A
Length	690 m
Date production	1901–1902, completed in 1910
Location	km 30 between Jember-Banyuwangi railway line

== Service ==
Trains that enter the Mrawan railway tunnel:

- Sri Tanjung, between Lempuyangan and Ketapang
- Blambangan Express, between Pasar Senen and Ketapang
- Wijayakusuma, between Cilacap and Ketapang
- Logawa, between Purwokerto and Ketapang (via Surabaya Gubeng)
- Ijen Express, between Malang and Ketapang
- Mutiara Timur, between Surabaya Pasar Turi
- Probowangi, between Surabaya Gubeng and Ketapang
- Tawang Alun, between Malang Kotalama and Ketapang
- Pandanwangi, between Jember and Ketapang
- Sangkuriang train, between Bandung and Ketapang (via Yogyakarta and Surabaya Gubeng)

== See also ==
- Pasuruan–Kalisat–Banyuwangi railway
