= Wonokromo–Bangil–Pasuruan railway =

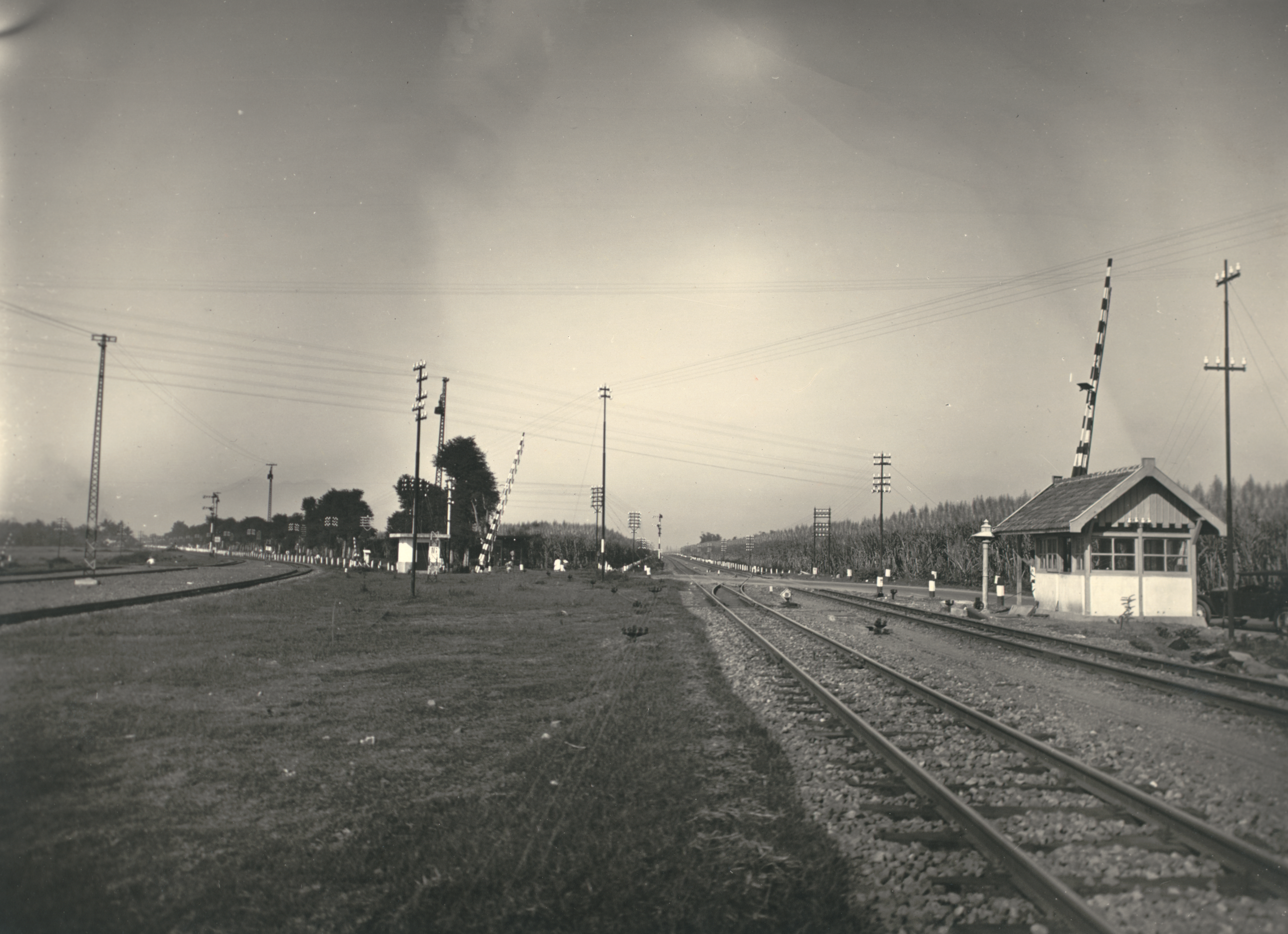
- Branch south of Wonokromo, left: to Pasuruan and right: to Solo Balapan.

Overview
- Native name: Jalur kereta api Wonokromo–Bangil–Pasuruan
- Status: Operational
- Owner: Directorate General of Railways (DJKA)
- Locale: Surabaya-Pasuruan, East Java
- Termini: Wonokromo; Pasuruan
- Stations: 9

Service
- Type: Inter-city rail
- Operator: PT Kereta Api Indonesia

History
- Opened: 16 May 1878

Technical
- Number of tracks: 1
- Track gauge: 1,067 mm (3 ft 6 in)
- Electrification: not available

The Wonokromo–Bangil–Pasuruan railway is a railway line between Wonokromo and Pasuruan.

It was the first railway line owned by the Staatsspoorwegen (SS). Along the Tanggulangin–Porong section, there is a retaining wall to prevent the Sidoarjo mud flow on the east side of the tracks. At Waru, there is a container terminal that is now unused, with loading and unloading activities moved to Kalimas. The Surabaya Kota–Wonokromo segment is part of the southern Java line that connects East Java with Central Java, the Special Region of Yogyakarta, West Java, and Jakarta and its buffer zone. This line is developed by the Surabaya Class I Railway Engineering Center within the Directorate General of Railways. Apart from the Surabaya Kota–Wonokromo segment which is double-track, the entire railway line is a single-track railway and uses semi-automatic Siemens & Halske type mechanical signalling.

== History ==
=== Introduction ===
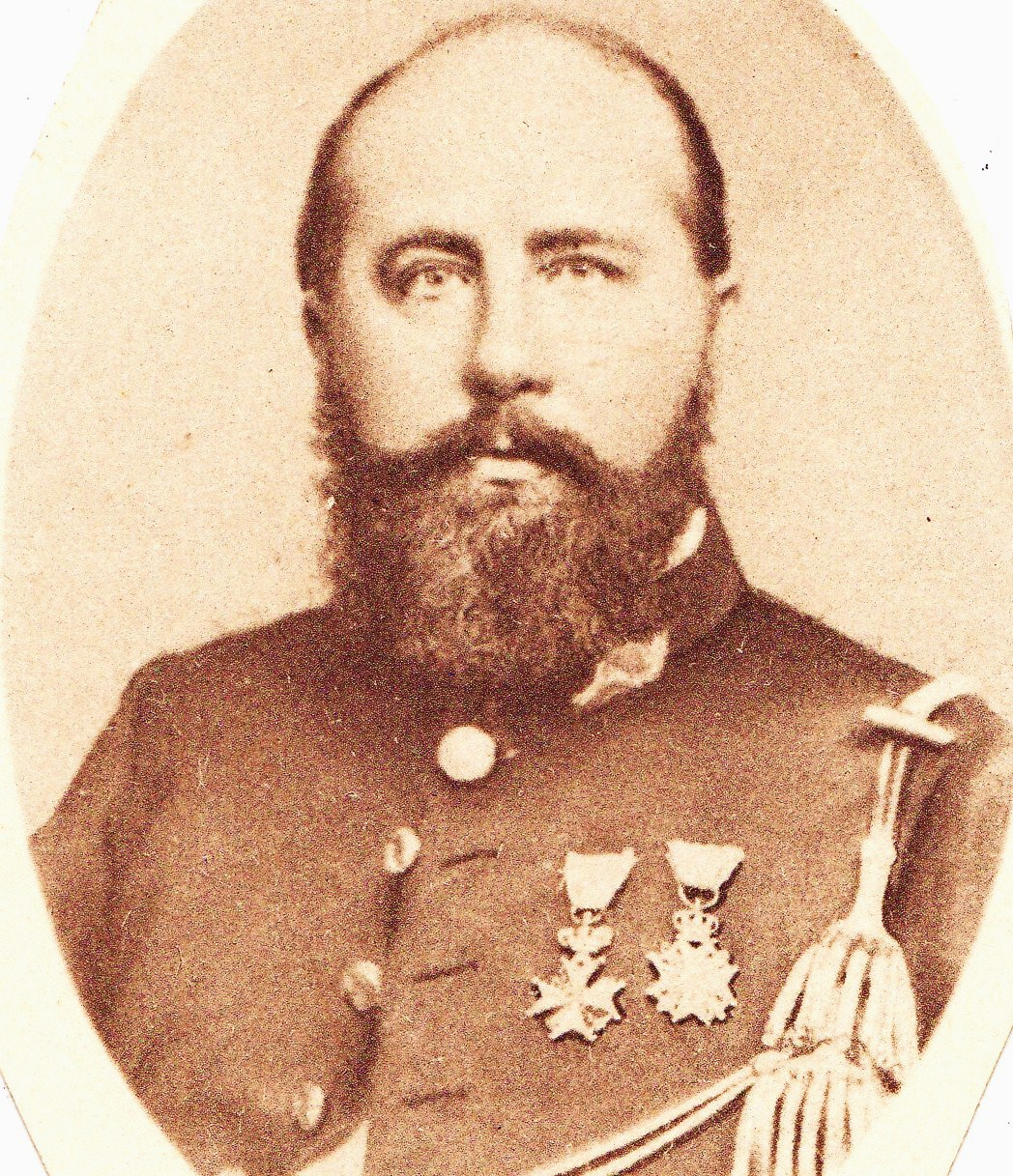
David Maarschalk

The Wonokromo–Pasuruan railway line was the first SS railway line completed on 16 May 1878. This line passed through Bangil and Sidoarjo, connecting sugar factories in Sidoarjo and Pasuruan with the port in Surabaya. Maarschalk carried out this construction with "a reasonable duration and without cost overruns."

=== Double track project ===
Previously, both the Wonokromo–Tarik and Wonokromo–Porong segments were double-track, but after the Japanese occupation, the lines were reverted to single-track. Double-track railway The Wonokromo–Sidoarjo and Surabaya Gubeng–Tarik lines were built in the early 1920s, but according to the SS annual report prepared for the 1923 fiscal year, the most recently completed segment was Wonokromo–Tarik. For Surabaya Kota–Wonokromo, the project wasn't yet completed, because the Kali Jagir bridge hadn't yet been built. In November 1924, the SS planned to expand the Wonokromo emplacement, in connection with the planned construction of a double track to Sidoarjo.

The Wonokromo–Bangil segment was also built, and in 1925 SS had reported that the doubling of the line cost ƒ4,000,000, and to carry out the project, the Kali Porong bridge was widened. In November 1926, there was a reappearance of discourse to extend the double track to Kertosono and Bangil, but SS management stated that the project was being postponed.

== Service ==
=== Passenger ===
==== Inter-city rail ====
Southern Java railway
Train name	Route
Executive-Premium Economy
Wijayakusuma	Cilacap–Surabaya Gubeng–Banyuwangi
Executive-Economy
Ranggajati	Cirebon–Surabaya Gubeng–Jember
Sangkuriang	Bandung–Surabaya Gubeng–Banyuwangi
Premium Economy
Logawa	Purwokerto–Surabaya Gubeng–Banyuwangi
Economy
Sri Tanjung	Lempuyangan–Surabaya Kota–Banyuwangi

Eastern Java railway
Train name	Route
Executive
Mutiara Timur Facultative	Surabaya Gubeng–Banyuwangi
Executive-Economy
Mutiara Timur	Surabaya Pasarturi–Ketapang
Ijen Express	Malang–Ketapang
Economy
Probowangi	Surabaya Gubeng–Banyuwangi
Tawang Alun	Malang Kotalama–Ketapang

Northern Java railway
Train name	Route
Executive
Pandalungan	Gambir–Surabaya Pasarturi–Jember
Executive-Economy
Jayabaya	Pasar Senen–Surabaya Pasarturi–Malang
Blambangan Express	Pasar Senen–Surabaya Pasarturi–Banyuwangi

==== Commuter and Local ====
Train name	Route
Commuter Line Arjonegoro	Bojonegoro–Sidoarjo
Commuter Line Arjonegoro	Babat–Surabaya Pasarturi/Sidoarjo
Commuter Line Blorasura	Cepu–Surabaya Pasarturi
Dhoho Commuter Line	Surabaya Kota–Blitar–Surabaya Kota via Kertosono–Malang rotate counterclockwise
Dhoho Commuter Line	Surabaya Kota–Malang via Kertosono rotate counterclockwise
Dhoho Commuter Line	Surabaya Kota–Blitar via Kertosono rotate counterclockwise
Dhoho Commuter Line	Surabaya Kota–Kertosono
Dhoho Commuter Line	Blitar–Surabaya Kota via Malang
Dhoho Commuter Line	Malang–Surabaya Kota
Commuter Line Jenggala	Babat–Surabaya Gubeng–Mojokerto via Krian
Commuter Line Jenggala	Indro–Sidoarjo/Mojokerto
Commuter Line Jenggala	Indro–Krian–Mojokerto
Commuter Line Jenggala	Surabaya Pasarturi–Sidoarjo
Penataran Commuter Line	Surabaya Kota–Blitar–Surabaya Kota via Malang–Kertosono rotate clockwise
Penataran Commuter Line	Surabaya Kota–Blitar via Malang rotate clockwise
Penataran Commuter Line	Malang–Blitar–Surabaya Kota via Kertosono rotate clockwise
Penataran Commuter Line	Blitar–Surabaya Kota via Kertosono
Penataran Commuter Line	Surabaya Kota–Malang
Penataran Commuter Line	Kertosono–Surabaya Kota
Supas Commuter Line	Surabaya Kota–Pasuruan
Pandanwangi	Jember–Banyuwangi

=== Freight ===
Northern Java railway
Train name	Route
BBM Pertamina Cargo	Benteng–Malang Kotalama

== See also ==
- Kertosono–Bangil railway
