= Ijen Express =

Passenger train Malang - Ketapang, Banyuwangi service in Indonesia

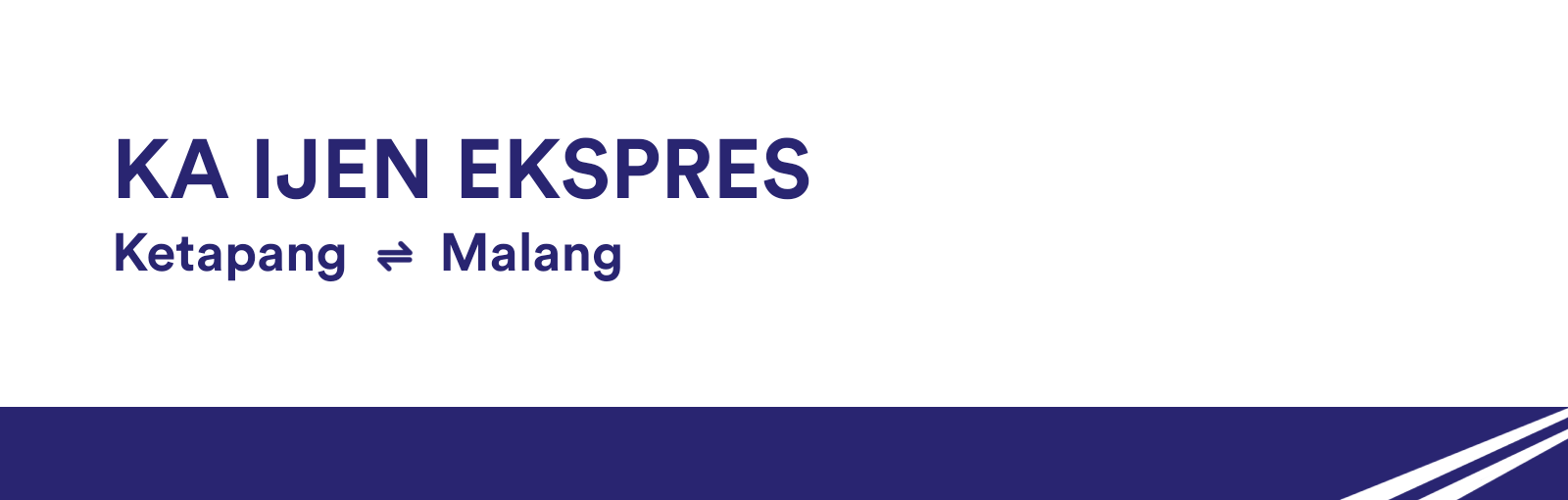

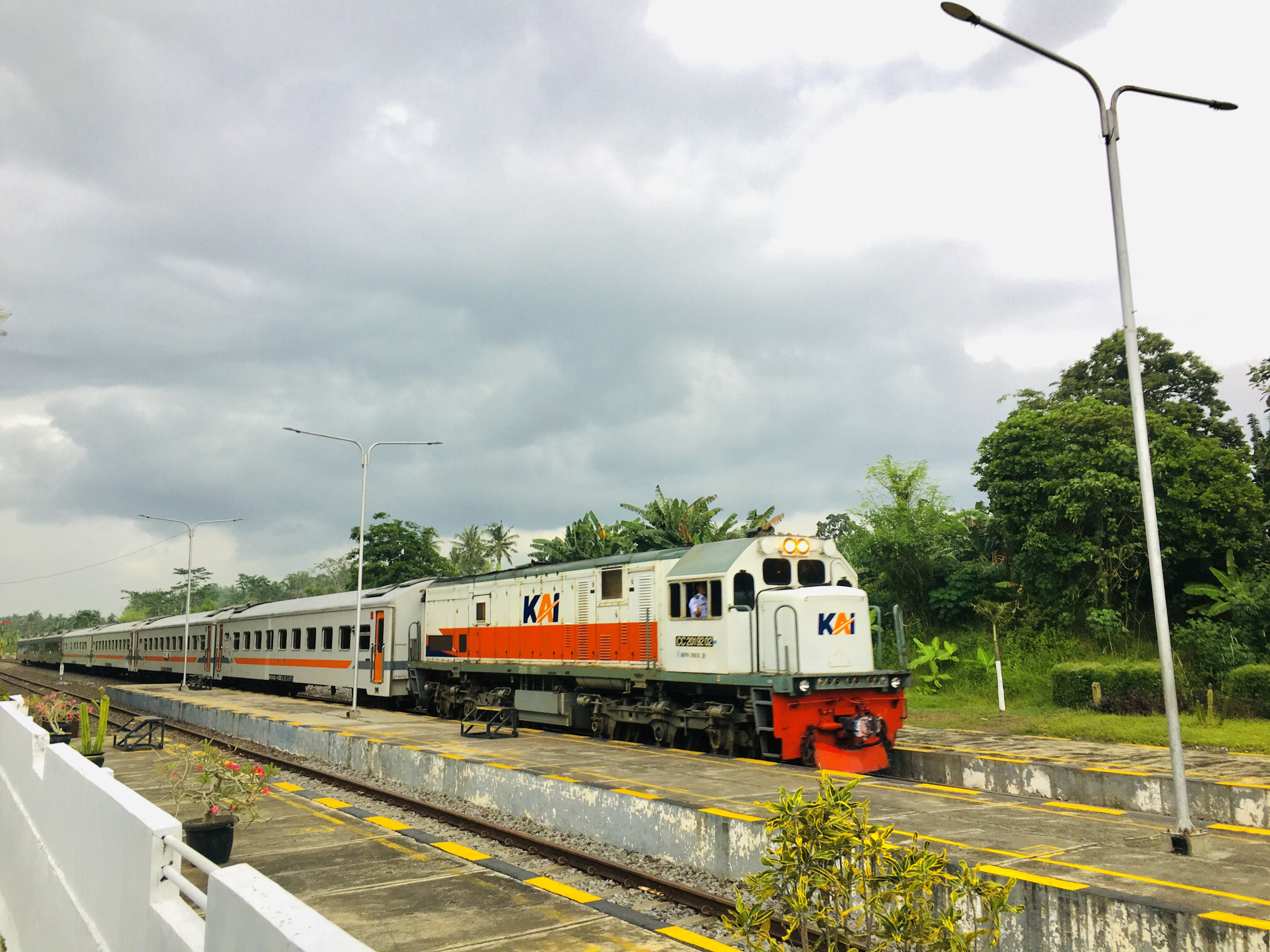
- Ijen Express arrive in Banyuwangi Kota heading to Ketapang, 2025

Overview
- Service type: Inter-city rail
- Status: Operational
- Locale: Operational Area IX Jember
- First service: 1 February 2025
- Current operator: Kereta Api Indonesia

Route
- Termini: Malang; Ketapang
- Distance travelled: 312 kilometres (194 miles)
- Average journey time: 7 hours 2 minutes
- Service frequency: daily each way
- Train number: 239F-242F

On-board services
- Classes: economy and executive
- Seating arrangements: 50 seats arranged 2-2 (executive class); 72 seats arranged 2-2 (economy class)
- Catering facilities: On-board cafe and trolley service

Technical
- Rolling stock: CC203; CC201
- Track gauge: 1,067 mm
- Operating speed: 60–100 kilometres per hour (37–62 mph)
Route map
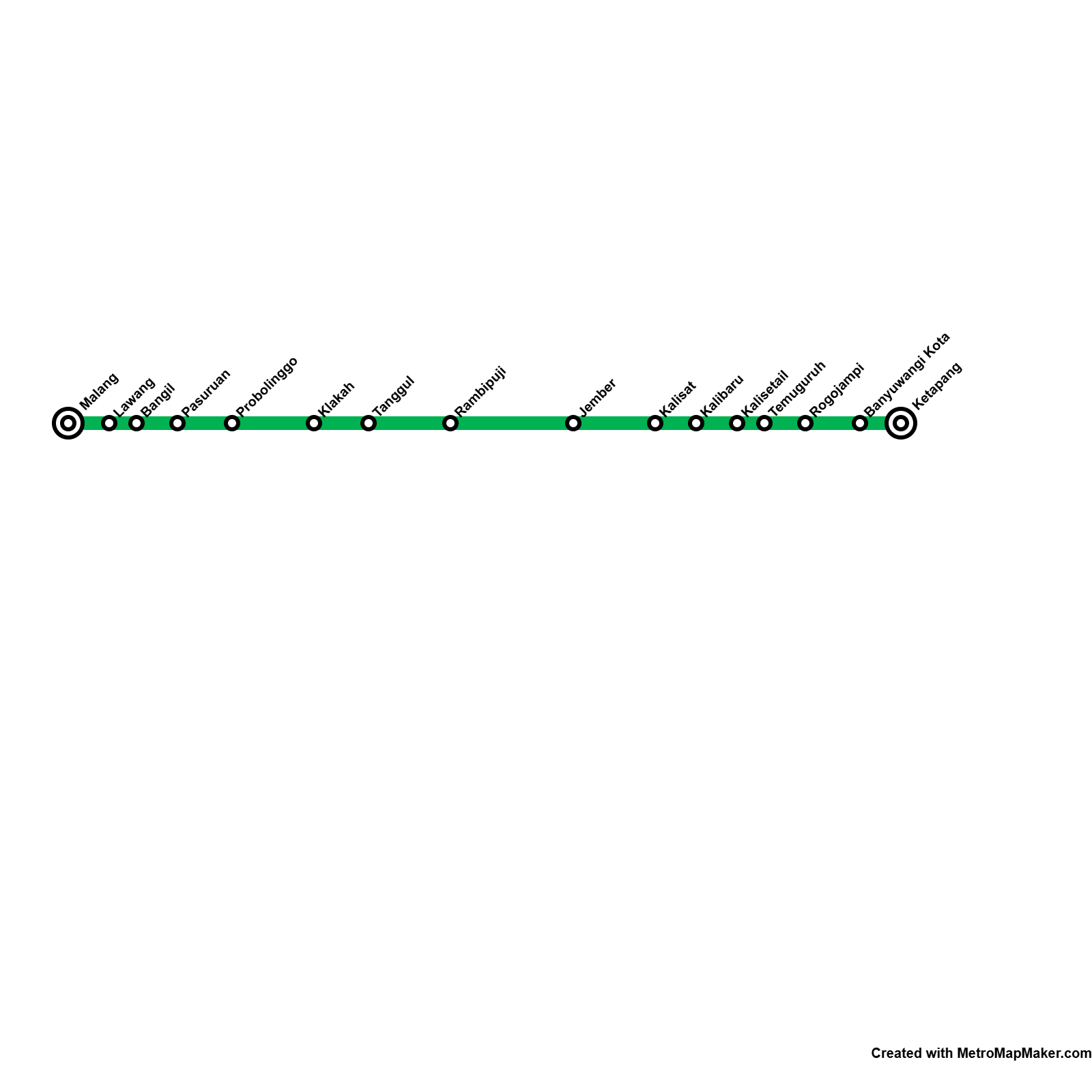

Ijen Express is an passenger train with the executive and economy class that is operated by Kereta Api Indonesia which between Malang and Ketapang via Bangil and Jember. The trip time around 312 km (194 mil) in 7 hours 2 minutes.

The Ijen Express itself as the 2nd name "Express" after the Blambangan Express from Pasar Senen as the Indonesia's longest inter-city rail at Pasuruan-Kalisat-Banyuwangi railway line. The Ijen Express also support for the Tawang Alun which has a subsidized economy class (PSO).

== Branding ==
The name "Ijen Express" itself comes from the stratovolcano located on the borders of the Horseshoe in East Java, namely Bondowoso Regency and Banyuwangi Regency, namely Mount Ijen.

== History ==
Before the Ijen Express on the Banyuwangi–Malang, there was a rumor of this train service with the Jember–Jakarta route in Gapeka 2023, although the Ijen Express wasn't yet listed in the enactment of new train travel chart 2023 in 2023. However, this train was canceled and replaced with the Pandalungan (train) service on the Jakarta–Jember route via the northern Java route. In 2025, this train service reappeared in the enactment of new train travel chart 2025 with the Banyuwangi–Malang route, namely the Ijen Express.

In the enactment of new train travel chart 2025, the Ijen Express officially operated using a series of executive class trains stainless steel produced in 2018 which are second-hand from Jakarta Kota Depot, while the latest generation economy class trains are modified which are second-hand from Sidotopo Depot. This train series consists of two executive class trains made of stainless steel, four latest generation economy class trains modified by Balai Yasa Manggarai, and one dining car with power plant facilities.

== Station ==
Here's route station of the Ijen Express is:

- Malang (start/end)
- Lawang
- Bangil (for car curtains of locomotive to Malang or Ketapang, Banyuwangi)
- Pasuruan
- Probolinggo
- Klakah
- Tanggul
- Rambipuji
- Jember
- Kalisat
- Kali Baru
- Kali Setail
- Temuguruh
- Rogo Jampi
- Banyuwangi Kota
- Ketapang (start/end)

== Incident ==
- On 30 April 2025, the Ijen Express collided with a truck at level crossing 9 between Kalisat and Ledokombo and was delayed.

== See also ==
- Tawang Alun
