= Pasuruan railway station =

Railway station in Indonesia

SP18 PB06 TA05 Pasuruan railway station Stasiun Pasuruan
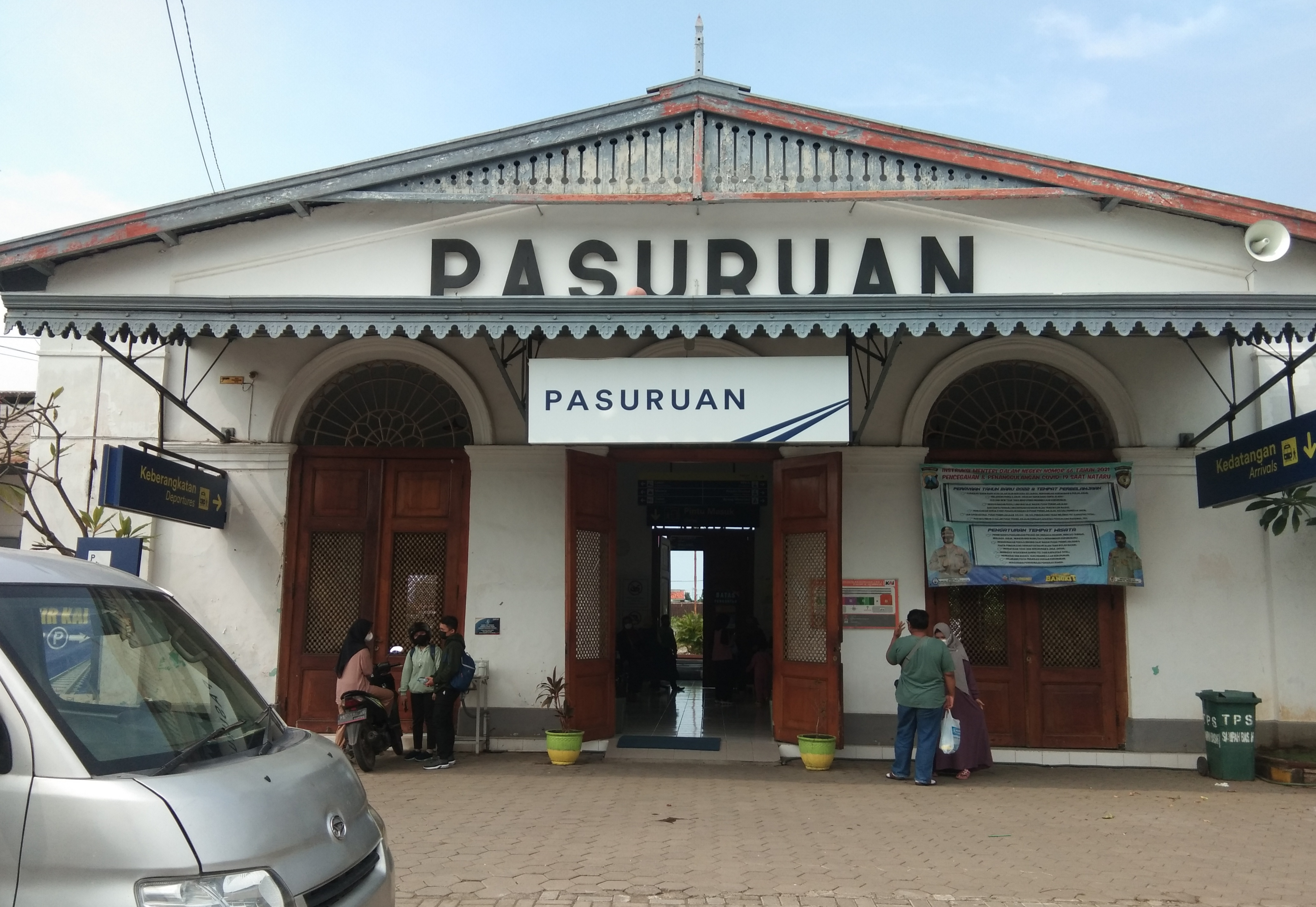
- Main entrance of Pasuruan train station

General information
- Location: Stasiun Pasuruan street, Trajeng, Panggungrejo, Pasuruan; East Java; Indonesia
- Coordinates: 7.6378384°S 112.910158°E
- Elevation: +3 m (9.8 ft)
- Owner: Kereta Api Indonesia
- Operator: Kereta Api Indonesia
- Lines: Wonokromo–Bangil–Pasuruan; Bangil–Kalisat
- Platforms: 1 island platform 1 side platform
- Tracks: 4

Construction
- Structure type: Ground
- Parking: Available
- Cycle facilities: Available
- Accessible: Available

Other information
- Station code: PS

History
- Opened: 16 May 1878; 148 years ago
- Former names: Station Pasoeroean

Services
Preceding station		Following station
Bangil towards Surabaya Kota	Commuter Line Supas SB-PS	Terminus
Bangil towards Surabaya Kota	Commuter Line Supas SB-PB	Probolinggo towards Pasuruan or Probolinggo
Location
- Location within Java

Pasuruan Station (PS) is a II class railway station located in Trajeng, Panggungrejo, Pasuruan; this station is in PT.KAI Operation Area IX of Jember at a height of 3 meters (9.8 ft) above sea level.

This station is the terminus for local commuter Surabaya-Pasuruan trains. At present, all of the passenger trains which travel through Bangil-Jember line stop at this station.

== History ==
This station is one of the most oldest train stations in East Java. It was commissioned by Staatsspoorwegen Oosterlijnen (East Line) on 16 May 1878 as the end point of Surabaya-Sidoarjo-Bangil-Pasuruan line. It was built not far from Hoofdstraat or de Grote Postweg (see Great Post Road), now Jl. Soekarno Hatta provincial road in the Indische-Empire and Neoclassic style.

The station previously had 7 tracks, one of which led to the train workshop, warehouses and a locomotive turntable. One track on the eastern side was a branch which connected to the light rail line or tram line belonging to a private tramway company named Pasoeroean Stoomtram Maatschappij (PsSM).

In addition, to the west of this station before entering Bangil there was a small station named Kraton which was used by natives as commuter station and also connected to the coffee factory not far from there. It was closed because the station was so close to Pasuruan.

== Building layout ==
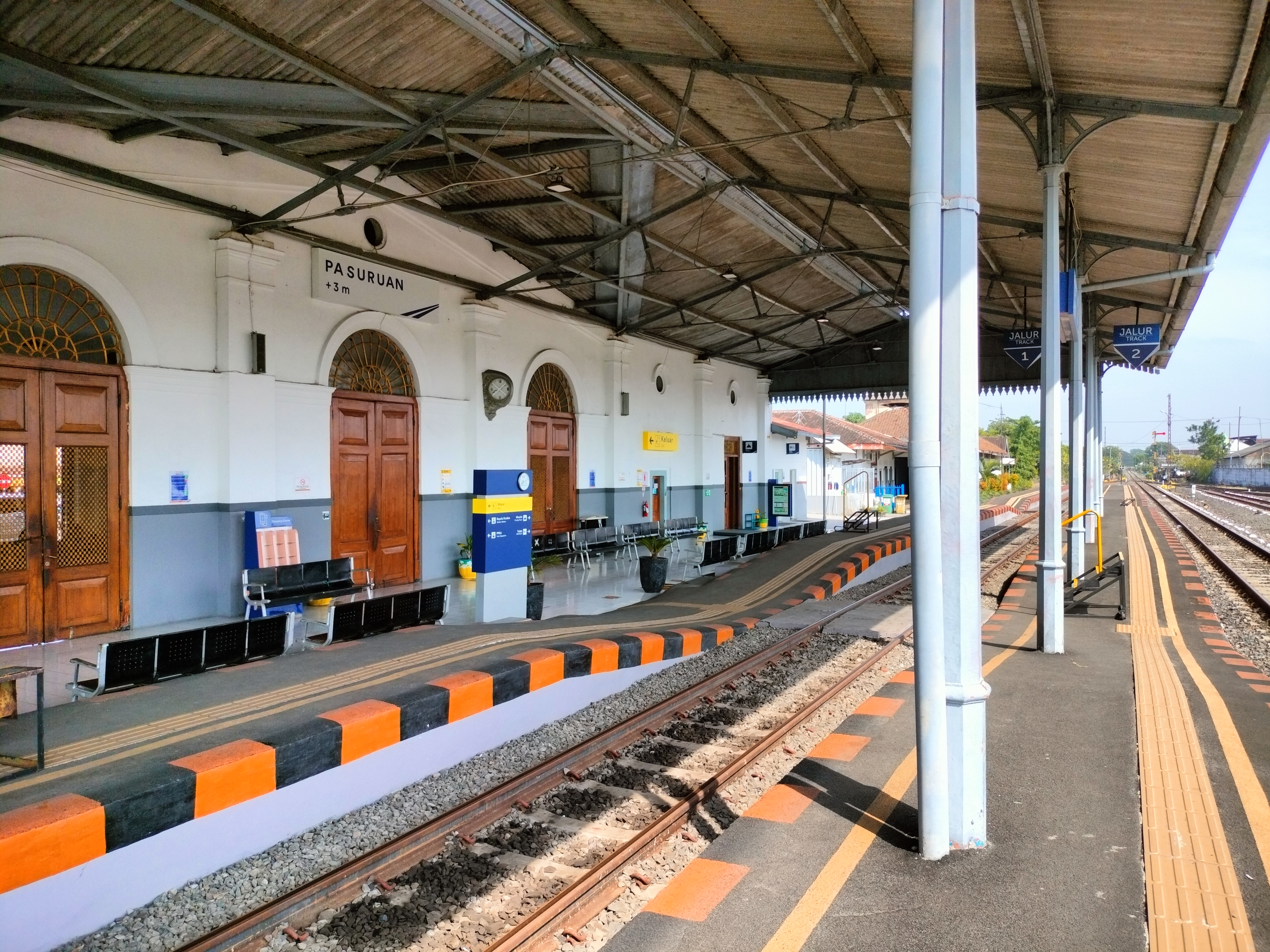
New image of the station's inner side platform (taken from the island platform of the second track), with 2021 stayle of station nametag.

Pasuruan is a side stop railway station. It has 4 active tracks, and an additional turn track as a buffer stop or stop block. It has a side platform for the first track and an island platform for the second track as a stop for intercity and commuter trains. The first and third tracks are is used as a passing loop. The third track is sometimes used when train traffic is busy due to delay or early arrivals. The fourth track is rarely used.

4th Track
Loop track (rarely used)
3rd Track
Loop track (occasionally used)
2nd Track
← Straight track also as the main line train stop →
Island platform
1st Track
← Main loop track for the train stop →

(Bangil) ← Local Commuter Surabaya-Pasuruan, from and to Surabaya Kota

Side platform
G
main building of the station

== Train services ==
=== Commuter line ===
Railway Line	Name of the train	Class	Direction	Description
Wonokromo–Bangil―Pasuruan	Local Commuter Surabaya―Pasuruan	Economy	Surabaya Kota	Round trip train. Depart at 05:25, 10:05, 16:10 and 20:40.
Wonokromo–Bangil―Pasuruan	Local Commuter Surabaya―Pasuruan	Economy	Pasuruan	Round trip train. Depart at 05:25, 10:05, 16:10 and 20:40.

=== Intercity ===
Railway Line	Name of the train	Class	Direction	Description
Northern Java Line	Blambangan Express	Executive and Premium Economy	Ketapang (Banyuwangi)	via Surabaya Gubeng–Surabaya Pasar Turi
Northern Java Line	Blambangan Express	Executive and Premium Economy	Jakarta Pasar Senen	via Surabaya Gubeng–Surabaya Pasar Turi
Northern Java Line	Pandalungan	Executive	Jember	via Surabaya Gubeng–Surabaya Pasar Turi–Semarang Tawang
Northern Java Line	Pandalungan	Executive	Jakarta Gambir	via Surabaya Gubeng–Surabaya Pasar Turi–Semarang Tawang
Southern Java Line	Ranggajati	Executive and Premium Economy	Cirebon	-
Southern Java Line	Ranggajati	Executive and Premium Economy	Jember	-
Southern Java Line	Wijayakusuma	Executive and Premium Economy	Cilacap	-
Southern Java Line	Wijayakusuma	Executive and Premium Economy	Ketapang (Banyuwangi)	-
Southern Java Line	Mutiara Timur	Executive and Premium Economy	Yogyakarta	No schedule for this moment
Southern Java Line	Mutiara Timur	Executive and Premium Economy	Ketapang (Banyuwangi)	No schedule for this moment
Southern Java Line	Logawa	Bisnis (Business) and Economy	Purwokerto	-
Southern Java Line	Logawa	Bisnis (Business) and Economy	Jember	-
Southern Java Line	Sri Tanjung	Economy	Lempuyangan	-
Southern Java Line	Sri Tanjung	Economy	Ketapang (Banyuwangi)	-
Eastern Java Line	Probowangi	Economy	Surabaya Gubeng	-
Eastern Java Line	Probowangi	Economy	Ketapang (Banyuwangi)	-
Eastern Java Line	Tawang Alun	Economy	Malang	-
Eastern Java Line	Tawang Alun	Economy	Ketapang (Banyuwangi)	-

== Gallery ==
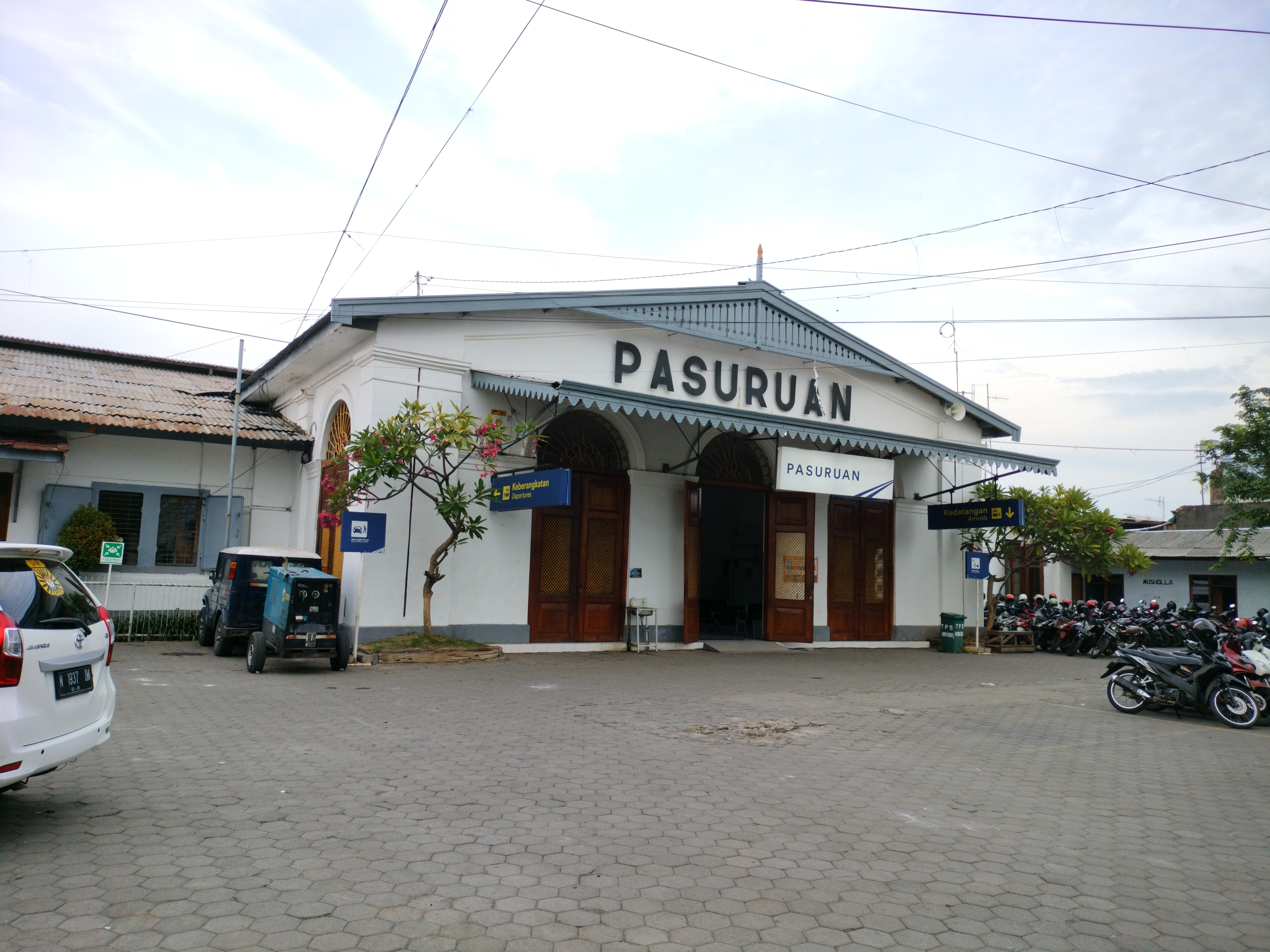
The main building of Pasuruan railway station from the parking lot (2022)

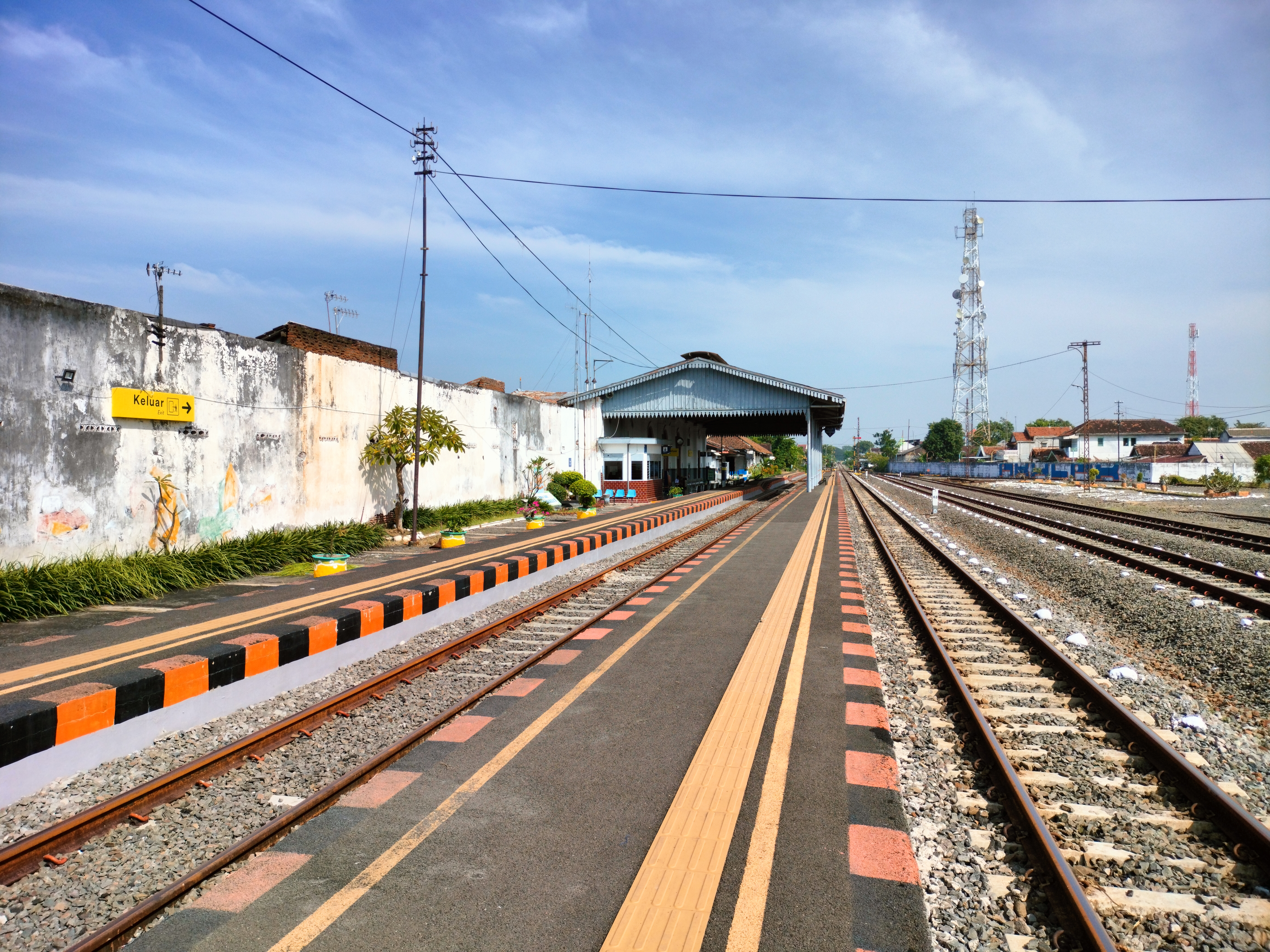
The elevated platform of Pasuruan railway station from the second track, taken in 2023

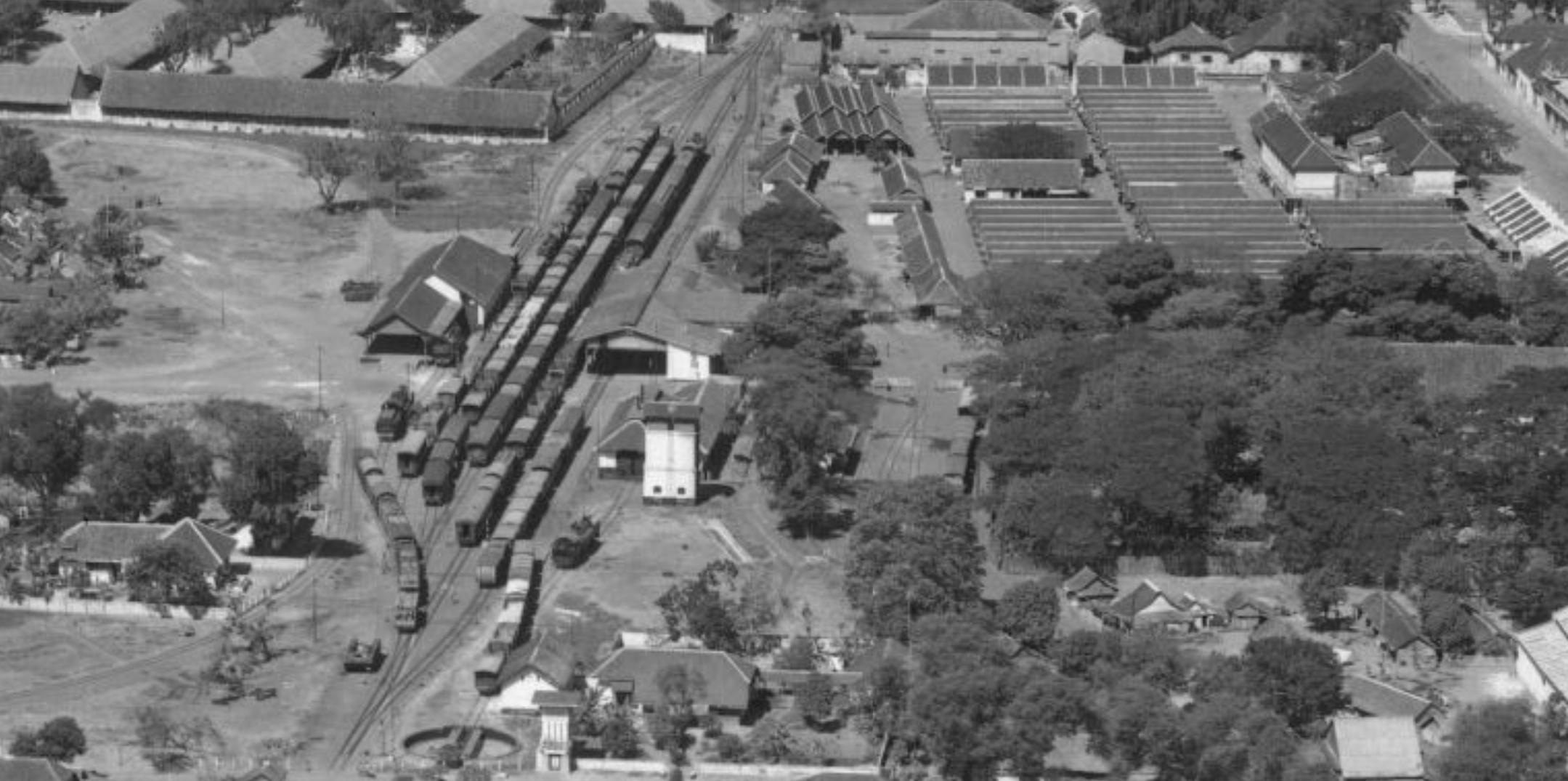
Aerial photo of Pasuruan Station (from west) along with PsSM Station in 1947

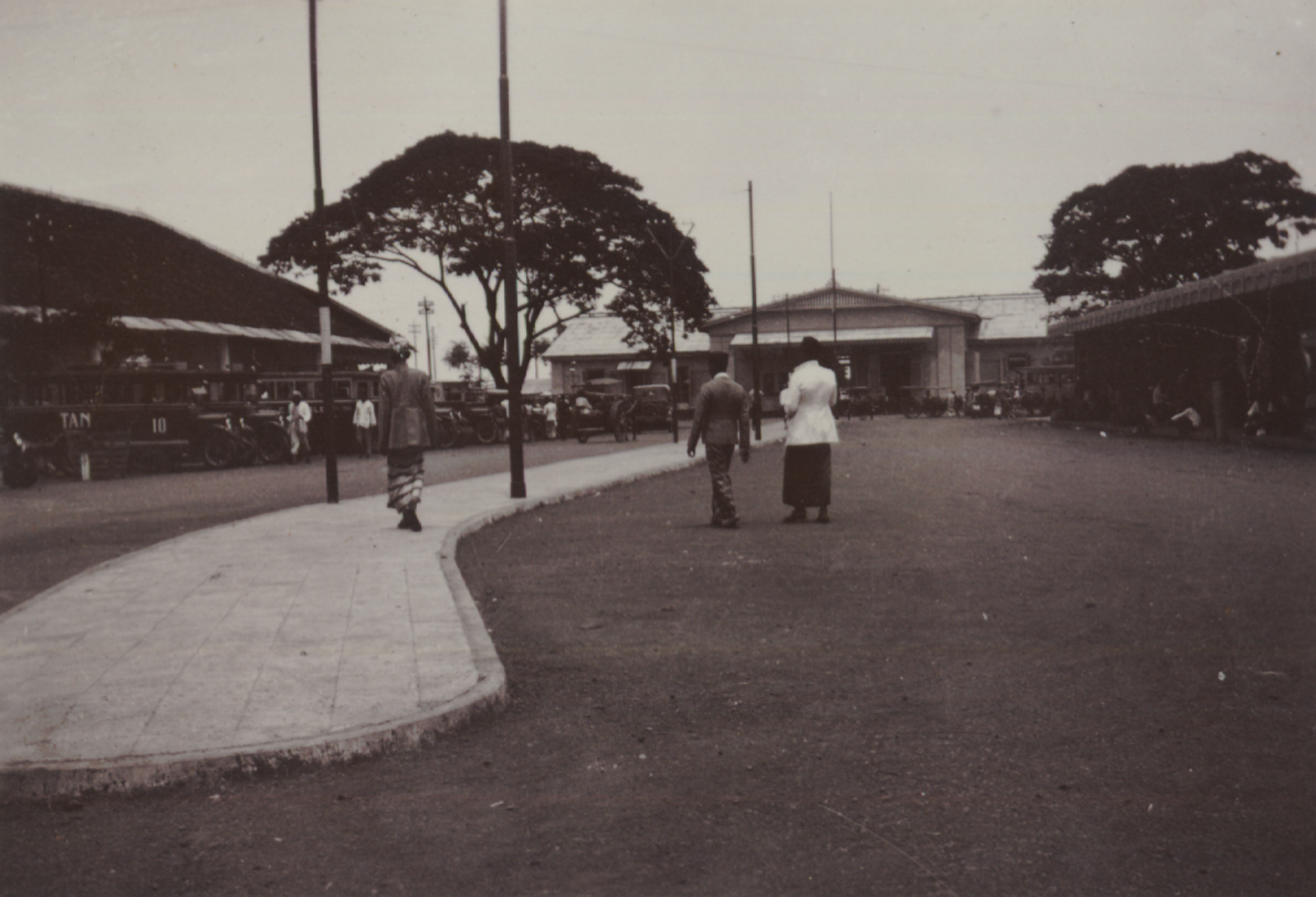
Station street which connecting Postweg (now Soekarno Hatta road) to Pasuruan Station (middle), taken c. 1929

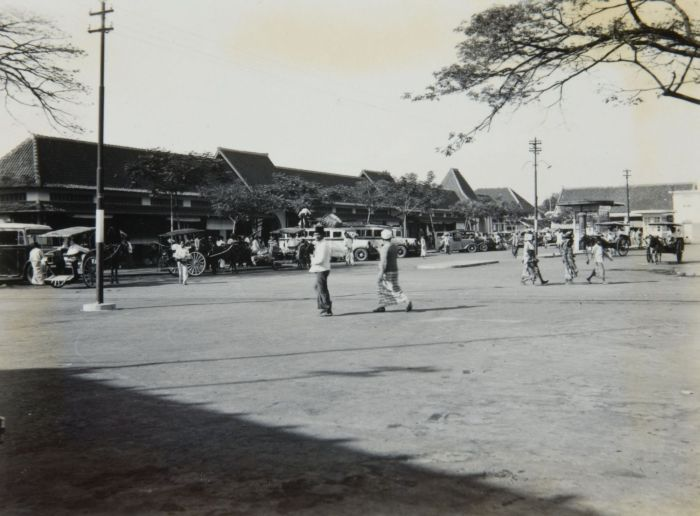
Front yard of Pasuruan train station, c. 1934
