= Pandalungan =

Passenger train service between Jakarta and Jember, Indonesia

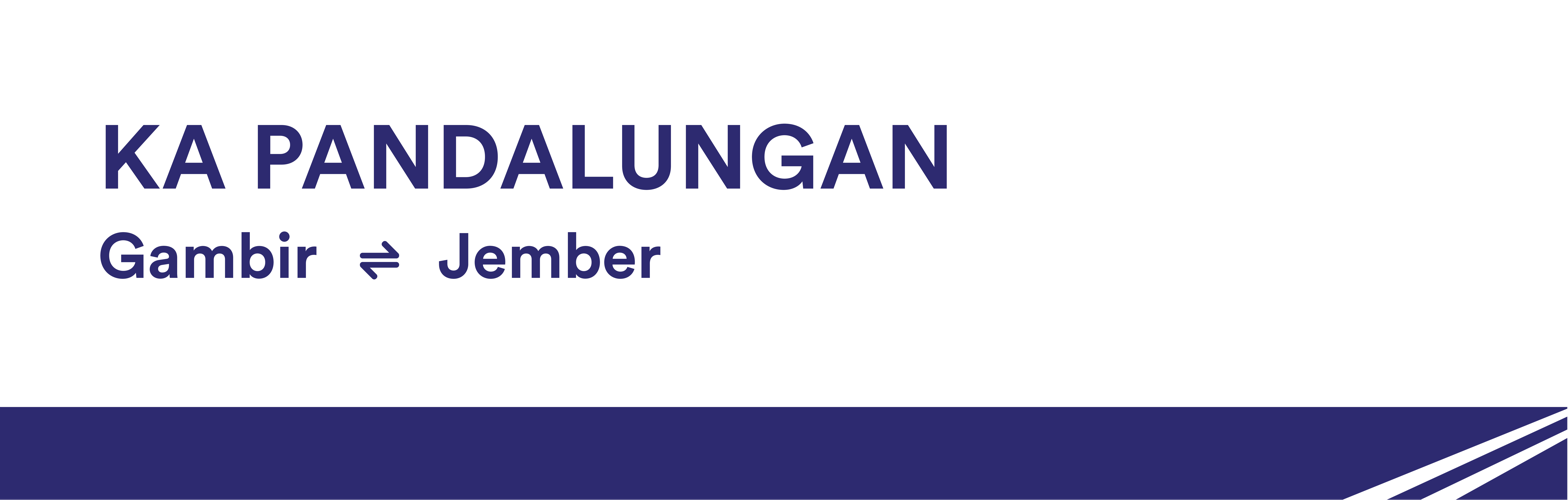

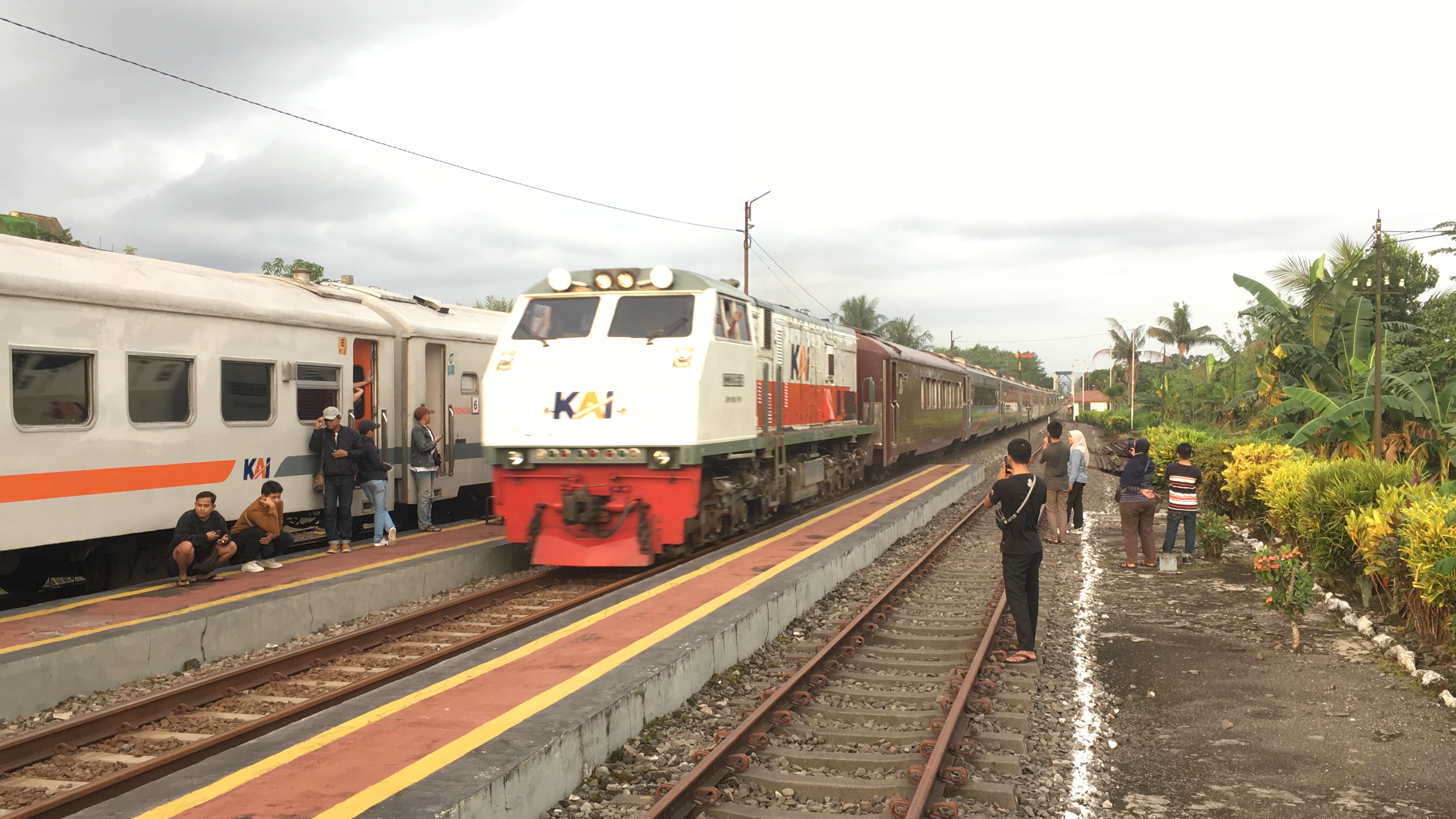
- Pandalungan passed Jatiroto station, 2025

Overview
- Service type: Inter-city rail
- Status: Operational
- First service: 1 June 2023
- Current operator: Kereta Api Indonesia

Route
- Termini: Gambir; Jember
- Distance travelled: 919 km (571 mil)
- Average journey time: 12 hours 47 minutes
- Service frequency: Daily each way
- Train numbers: 31/34 - 32/33 (night); 7049/7048 - 7050/7047 (morning)

On-board services
- Classes: executive & priority
- Seating arrangements: 50 seats arranged 2-2 (executive class); 28 seats arranged 2-2 (priority); Seats can recline and swivel
- Catering facilities: On-board cafe and trolley service

Technical
- Rolling stock: CC206
- Track gauge: 1067 mm
- Operating speed: 80 km/h (50 mph) to 120 km/h (75 mph)
Route map
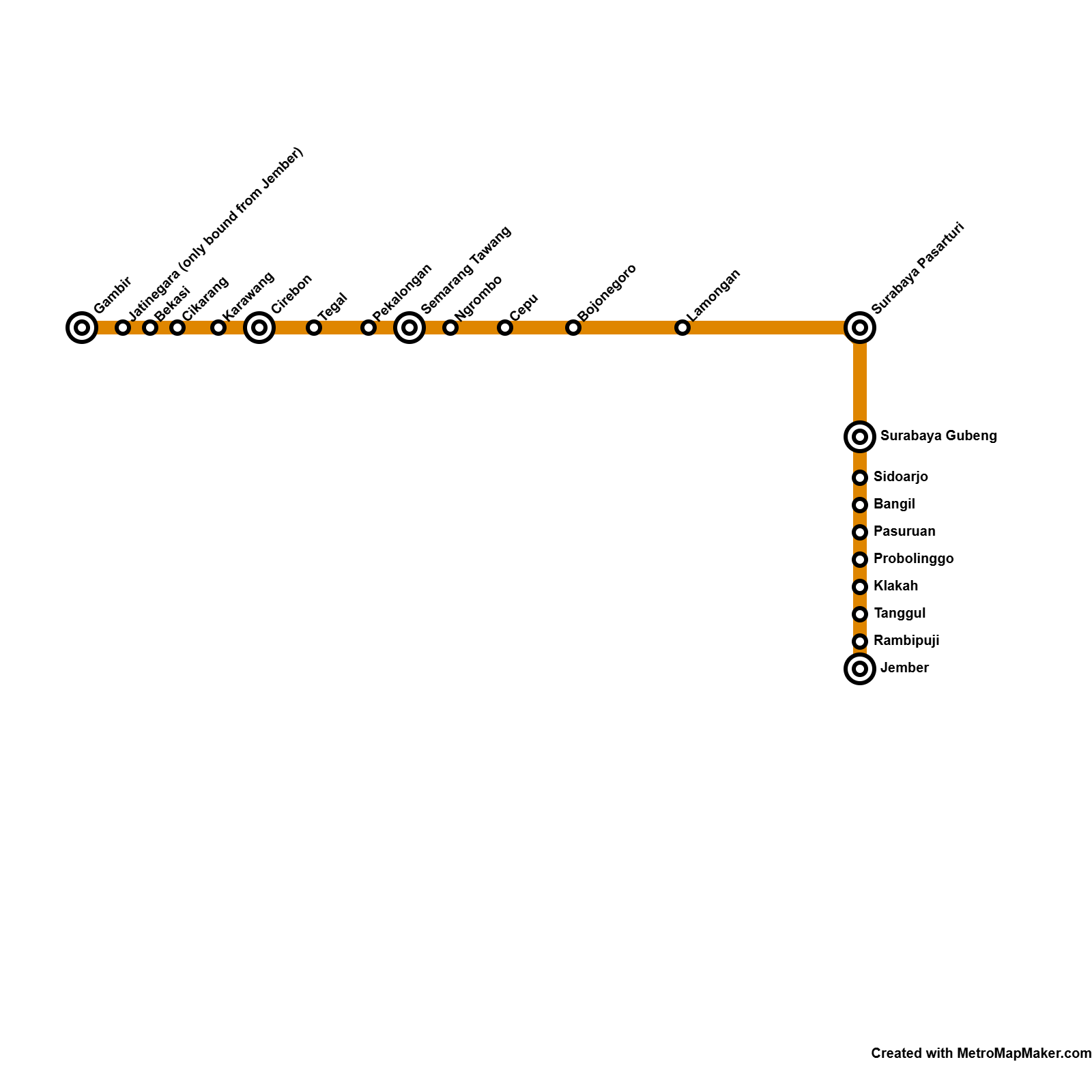

Pandalungan train is an executive & priority class that operated by Kereta Api Indonesia in Java which between Gambir and Jember via Semarang Tawang and Surabaya Pasarturi.

The train offer 2x daily each way with morning and evening/night schedule around 919 km (571 mil) approximately 12 hours 47 minutes for this trip from Jakarta to Jember via Semarang and Surabaya.

The train was once the longest intercity train in Indonesia. However, the Pandalungan train's position as the 3rd longest passenger train route in Indonesia after the Blambangan Express as the longest intercity train in Indonesia, which was extended to Jakarta in July 2024, with a distance of 1,031 km (640 mil) connecting the eastern tip (Banyuwangi) and the capital of Indonesia, Jakarta and the Sangkuriang as the 2nd longest intercity train in the country, which from Bandung to Ketapang since May 2026 with a distance of 1,002 km (662 mil) connecting the eastern tip Banyuwangi and the capital of West Java, Bandung.

The previous record was held by the Krakatau train (Krakatoa train), Merak-Blitar round trip, with 965 km (599 mil) via the southern route of Java, making it the only train to ever traverse all provinces on the island of Java.

== Origin ==
The name of Pandalungan comes from the assimilation or fusion of two distinct ethnicities and cultures, Javanese and Madurese, in the Oosthoek or Horseshoe region (the name for the eastern part of Java). Not only are languages and dialects intermingled, but so are the arts and cultural life of the people. The word "Pandalungan" means a large pot (large or expansive area) that accommodates many ethnic groups and gives rise to a unique new culture.

== History ==
On 1 June 2023 following of the enactment of new train travel chart 2023, PT KAI launching of the Pandalungan train from Jakarta Gambir to Jember making as the longest intercity in Indonesia that before changed by Blambangan Express train which between Jakarta Pasar Senen & Ketapang that causing the Pandalungan downgrade to the 2nd longest intercity in Indonesia after the Blambangan Express. The trains used are from the Sembrani addition trainsets. The Pandalungan train is a train service that connects Jakarta's Operational Area 1 to Jember's Operational Area 9 without a stopover in Surabaya for those traveling from Jakarta to Jember or vice versa.

The locomotive CC203 is often used as the locomotive to pull this train, although sometimes also using the locomotive CC201, CC204, or CC206.

On 20 December 2023, the Pandalungan which originally used a light steel series produced in the 1990s and 2000s, was replaced with a light steel series produced in 2016 and 2017 (known as the new image) which is a legacy of the Gajayana train on the Gambir–Malang service via the southern Java line (via Purwokerto–Yogyakarta). Then, along with the change in the Bima and Argo Semeru series to a new generation stainless steel series (stainless steel new generation) on 5 December 2024, the Pandalungan train uses a stainless steel series produced in 2018 and 2019 which is a legacy of the two trains.

On 2 March 2025, the Pandalungan train received A Priority tourist train by PT KAI.

This train set consists of eight executive class passenger cars, one Priority tourist car, one executive class dining car, and one power car.

Upon arrival in Jakarta, the Pandalungan train set will be used for the 137-138 Parahyangan that service on the Gambir-Bandung and vice versa.

On 18 June 2026, the Pandalungan train with morning schedule officially released as "Pandalungan 2" train by Kereta Api Indonesia because the passenger trains want to Jember for morning schedule.

== List of the Station ==
On 1 February 2025 following of the enactment of new train travel chart 2025, the Pandalungan train serving with the Priority Tourist class since 2 March 2025.

- Gambir (Start/End)
- Jatinegara (only bound from Jember)
- Bekasi (only bound from Gambir)
- Cikarang
- Karawang (only bound from Jember)
- Cirebon
- Tegal
- Pekalongan
- Semarang Tawang
- Ngrombo
- Cepu
- Bojonegoro
- Lamongan
- Surabaya Pasarturi
- Surabaya Gubeng
- Sidoarjo
- Bangil
- Pasuruan
- Probolinggo
- Klakah
- Tanggul
- Rambipuji
- Jember (Start/End)

== Accident & Incident ==
- On 14 January 2024 at 07:57 WIB, the Pandalungan train derailed right at the switch on the north side of Tanggulangin, Sidoarjo, East Java. This incident caused traffic jams on Kludan Highway and Perumtas Highway, because the rear of the train blocked the track. PT KAI Operational Area 8 Surabaya immediately evacuated the derailed locomotive and front carriage to ease train traffic on the Wonokromo–Bangil railway which had been disrupted. The KNKT investigation stated that this incident was caused by the right tongue of the switch not being able to be locked, so that the switch didn't have a position when the train passed.
- On 1 October 2024 at 08.50 local time, the Pandalungan train crashed into a truck loaded with animal feed between the Grati Station and Bayeman Station plots, precisely to the west of ayeman Station, Probolinggo Regency, East Java. The incident caused damage to the front of the locomotive CC203 95 08. There were no fatalities in the incident, but the engine driver, assistant engineer, and one officer who was traveling with the Pandalungan train locomotive were injured.

== See also ==
- Parahyangan
