= Ranggajati =

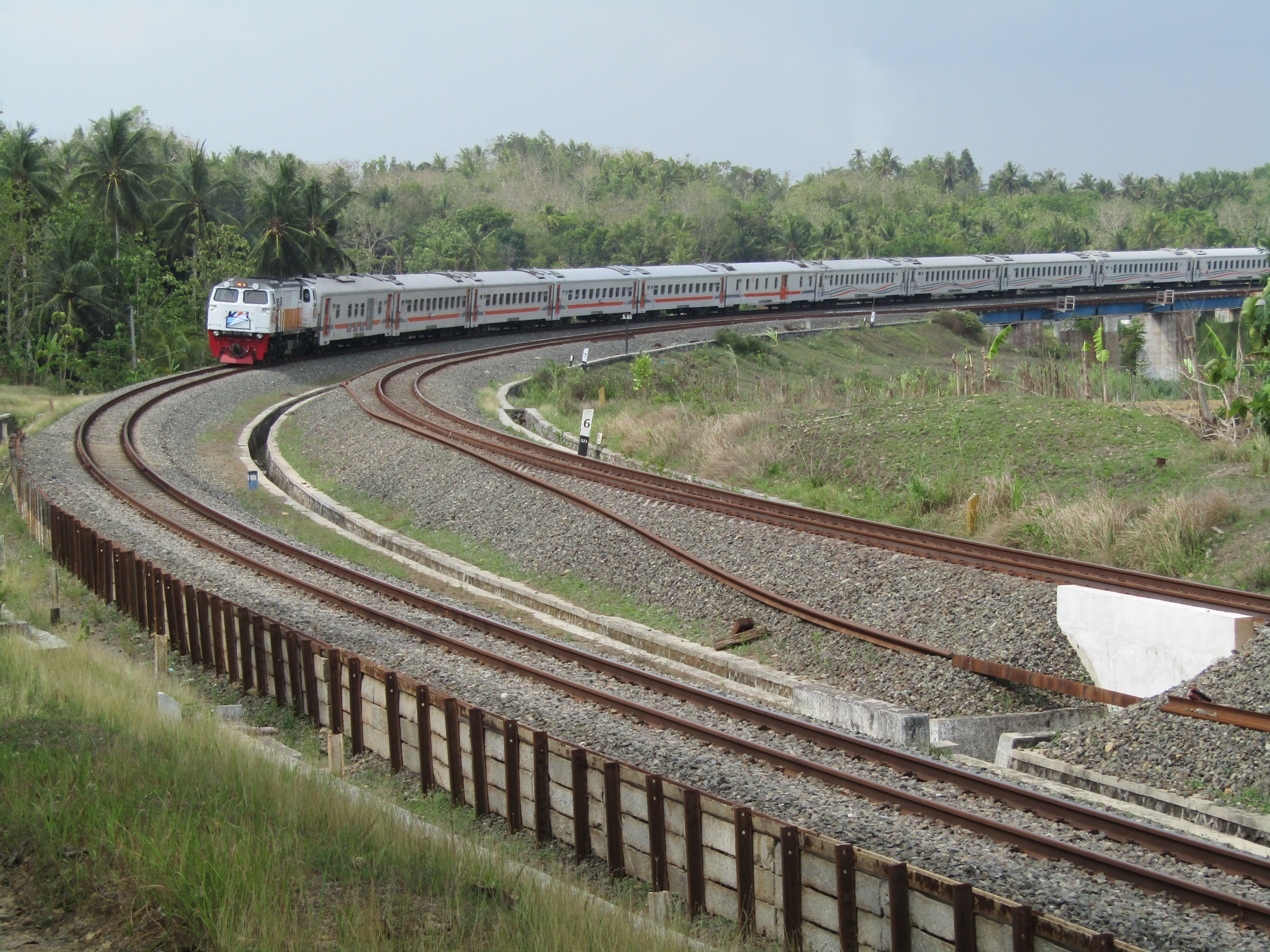
- Ranggajati train in Sentolo, Kulon Progo, Yogyakarta

Overview
- Service type: Inter-city rail
- Status: Operating
- Locale: West Java and East Java, Indonesia
- First service: 1 November 2016; 9 years ago
- Current operator: KAI Operational Area III Cirebon

Route
- Termini: Cirebon; Jember
- Distance travelled: 801 km (498 mi)
- Average journey time: 13 hours and 31 minutes
- Service frequency: daily each way
- Train number: 153-156

On-board services
- Classes: Executive and Economy class
- Seating arrangements: 2-2
- Catering facilities: On-board café
- Baggage facilities: Overhead racks.

Technical
- Track gauge: 1,067 mm (3 ft 6 in)
- Operating speed: 70–100 km/h

Ranggajati is a train that serves the Cirebon–Jember route via the southern railway line of Java Island (via Purwokerto–Yogyakarta–Surabaya Gubeng).

The name of this train comes from a figure from Cirebon named Ki Gede Ranggajati who was instrumental in spreading Islamic teachings in the Cirebon area (city and regency) at that time and was the founder of the Sumber Kingdom which later became the capital of the regency.

== History ==
The inauguration of this train was carried out on 1 November2016, attended by a number of officials from Greater Cirebon and the leadership of KAI Operations Area III Cirebon. Initially, the travel time for this train was 15 hours 53 minutes. At the same time, the Logawa train departing from Jember was delayed for 70 minutes.

Based on the latest schedule, the travel time of the Ranggajati train has been accelerated to 13 hours 43 minutes and since 1 November 2024, this train has changed its train series from the one that originally carried executive-business class to the executive-economy class series.

== Route ==
Station name	Distance from (km)		Location	
Station name	Previous station	Cirebon	Regency/Cities	Province
Cirebon	—		Cirebon	West Java
Ciledug	31.851		Cirebon Regency	West Java
Ketanggungan	16.033	47.884	Brebes	Central Java
Bumiayu	45.508	93.392	Brebes	Central Java
Purwokerto	37.385	130.777	Banyumas	Central Java
Kroya	27.277	158.054	Cilacap	Central Java
Gombong	28.489	186.543	Kebumen	Central Java
Kebumen	19.467	206.010	Kebumen	Central Java
Kutowinangun	8.993	215.003	Kebumen	Central Java
Kutoarjo	19.120	234.123	Purworejo	Central Java
Yogyakarta	63.649	297.772	Yogyakarta	Special Region of Yogyakarta
Klaten	28.558	326.330	Klaten	Central Java
Solo Balapan	30.579	356.909	Surakarta	Central Java
Sragen	28.959	385.868	Sragen	Central Java
Madiun	67.978	453.846	Madiun	East Java
Nganjuk	46.941	500.787	Nganjuk	East Java
Kertosono	21.954	522.741	Nganjuk	East Java
Jombang	15.391	538.132	Jombang	East Java
Mojokerto	24.139	562.271	Mojokerto	East Java
Surabaya Gubeng	44.403	606.674	Surabaya	East Java
Sidoarjo	22.035	628.709	Sidoarjo	East Java
Bangil	21.528	650.237	Pasuruan Regency	East Java
Pasuruan	15.938	666.175	Pasuruan	East Java
Probolinggo	38.475	704.650	Probolinggo	East Java
Klakah	33.933	738.583	Lumajang	East Java
Tanggul	31.666	770.249	Jember	East Java
Rambipuji	19.538	789.787	Jember	East Java
Jember	10.697	800.484	Jember	East Java

== Incident ==
On 17 December 2019, the air conditioning of this train was not working due to interference originating from the generator train shortly before entering Madiun.
