= Mutiara Timur =

Passenger train service in Indonesia since 1972

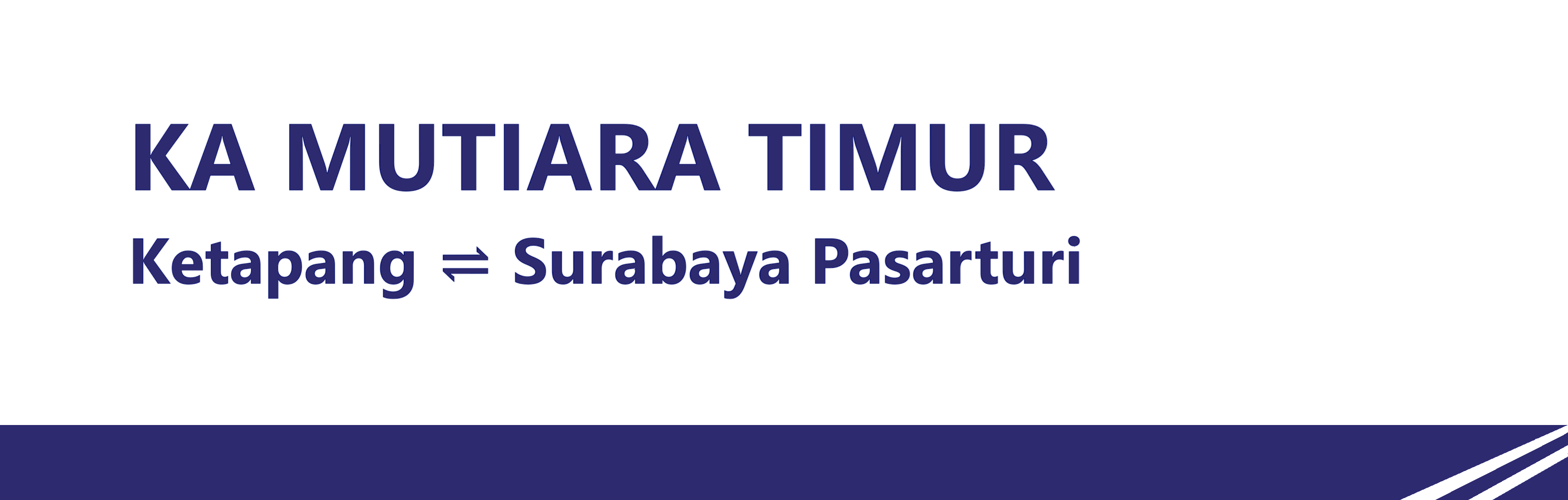

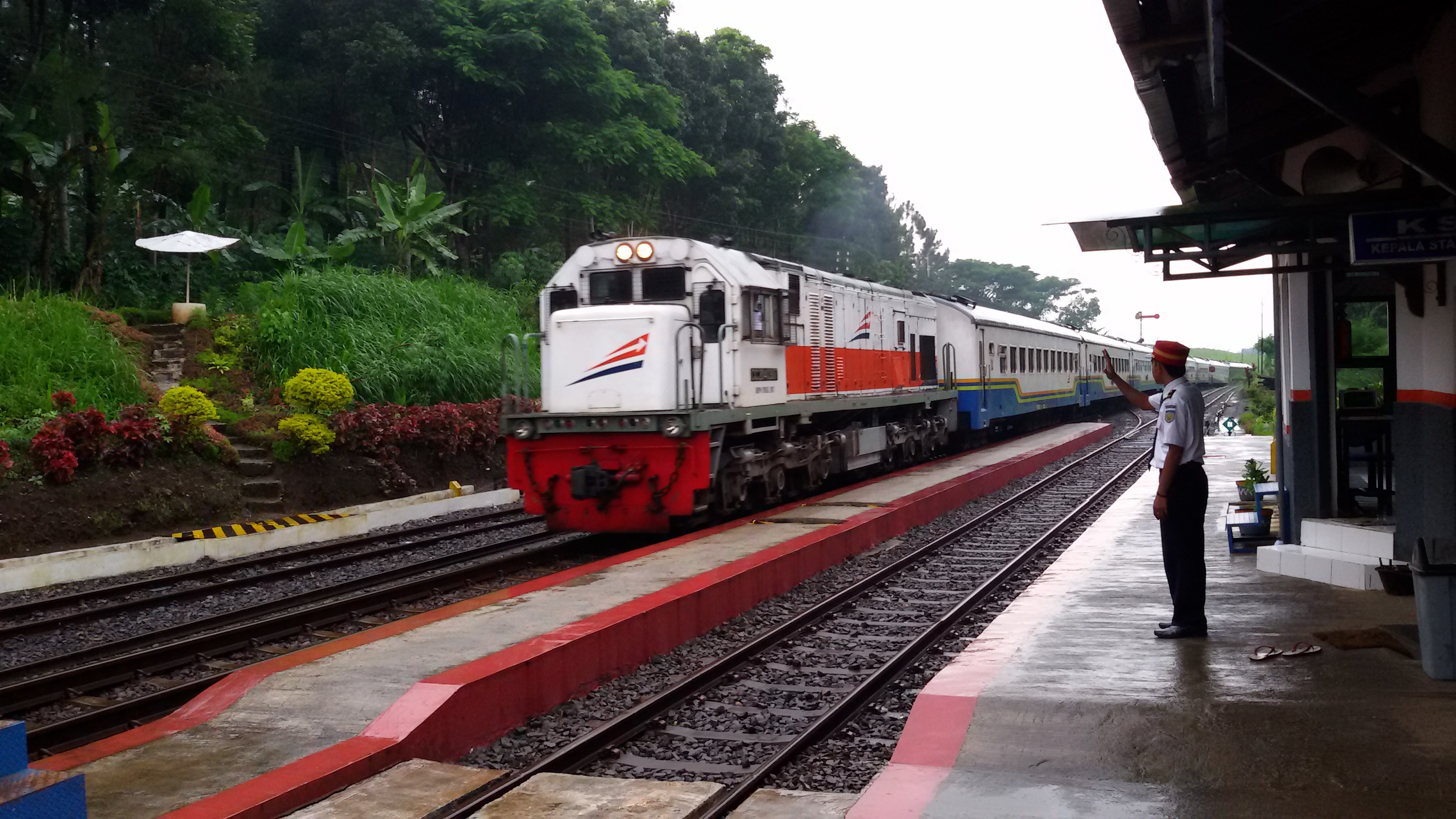
- Mutiara Timur passing Garahan, 2015

Overview
- Service type: Inter-city rail
- Status: Operational (regular and facultative)
- First service: 6 March 1973
- Current operator: Kereta Api Indonesia

Route
- Termini: Surabaya Pasarturi ketapang, Banyuwangi
- Distance travelled: 312 km (193 mi) (KTG-SBI); 307 km (190 mil) (KTG-SGU)
- Average journey time: KTG-SBI: 6 hours 20 minutes; KTG-SGU: 5 hours 54 minutes
- Service frequency: 1 Daily each time
- Train numbers: 209–210 (executive & economy); 211F-212F (executive)

On-board services
- Classes: executive & economy (KTG-SBI); executive & panoramic (sometimes service) (KTG-SGU)
- Seating arrangements: 50 seats arranged 2–2 (executive class); 72 seats arranged 2–2 (economy class)
- Catering facilities: On-board café and trolley service
- Observation facilities: The duplex panoramic glass, with blinds, heat insulating laminated layer

Technical
- Rolling stock: CC206/CC203/CC201
- Track gauge: 1.067 mm
- Operating speed: 50–70 km/h (31–62 mph)
Route map
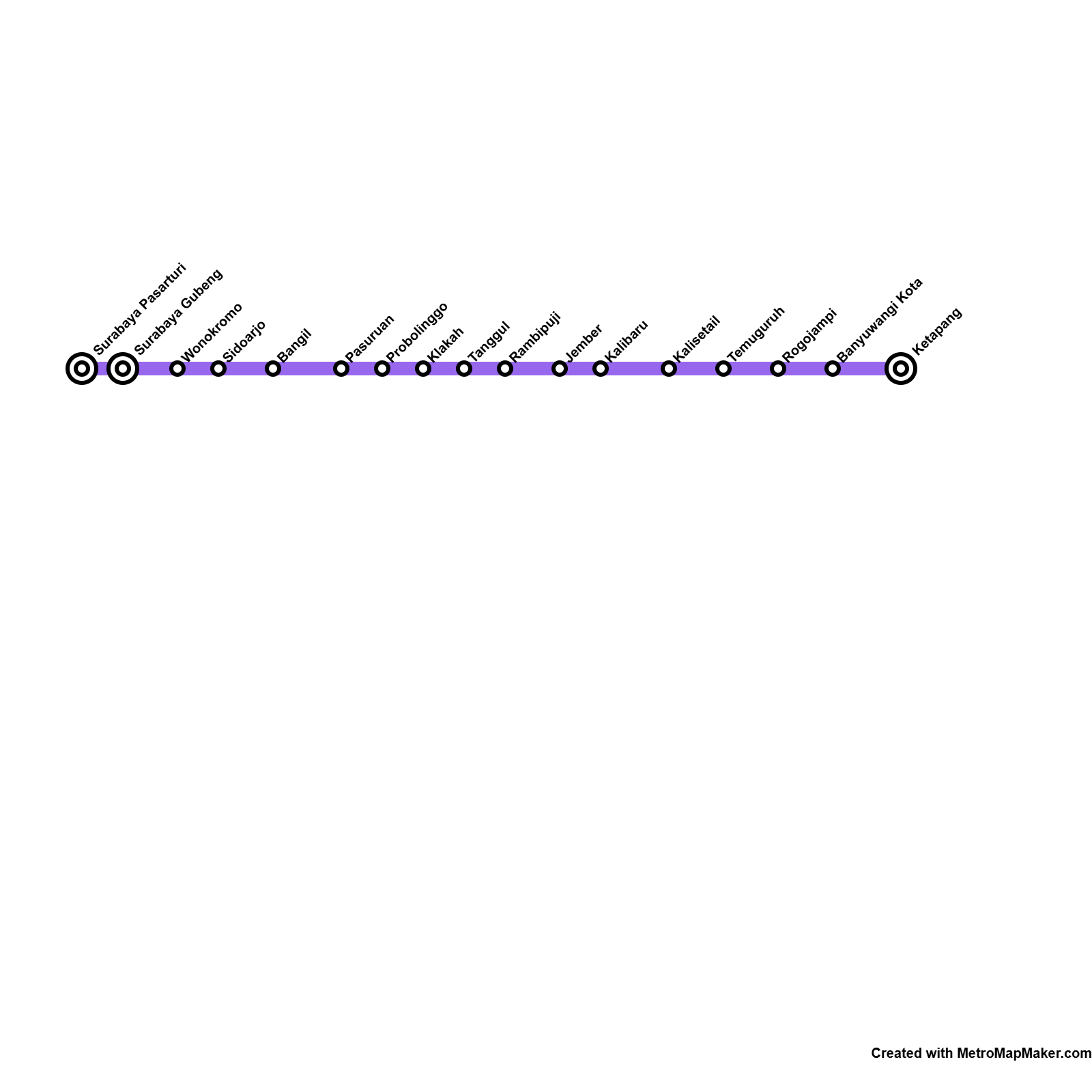

Mutiara Timur (in English is Eastern Pearl) is an executive, premium economy, and panoramic (sometimes operational for panoramic sets) passenger train that operated by Kereta Api Indonesia which between Surabaya Pasarturi and Ketapang (regular) also between Surabaya Gubeng and Ketapang (facultative).

This train as 3rd oldest oldest passenger train service in Indonesia after the Mutiara Selatan and Bima, which still operates under the same name since 1 June 1967 and 17 August 1972.

== History ==
=== Introduction (1973–2018) ===
On 6 March 1973, Railway Service Corporation LLC (PJKA) officially launched the Mutiara Timur on the route Surabaya Kota–Banyuwangi round trip with economy class (3rd class) service (2 CW with 80 rattan seats, 1 special CW with 80 covered seats, and 1 CFW with 32 passenger seats). This intercity train was launched as an alternative transportation for tourists who want to travel to Bali from Java. At that time, the infrastructure support capacity on the eastern Java route still used rails with numbers R2, R3, and R14 so that the train could only run at a maximum speed of 45 km/hour with a travel time of about 6.5 hours. In fact, so that the train could run faster, infrastructure improvements were made so that the train could run at 55 km/hour. This train was inaugurated by Soempono Bajoeadji, Directorate General of Land Transportation at that time.

At the launch of the Mutiara Timur, Bajoeadji bluntly accused the PJKA of lacking initiative in decision-making and relying too heavily on the government. He stated that the investment required for railway development was Rp5 billion (at the then-exchange rate of US$20 million), but that railway development at that time wasn't optimal. He was known as the most feared figure among PJKA officials, as he could immediately reprimand PJKA officials if there were indications of misconduct or indiscipline in their work. When launching the Mutiara Timur, he wanted the PJKA to optimize the transportation potential of natural resources from the eastern region of Java to accelerate national development.

In the early days of its operation, this train was pulled by a BB301, BB303, or BB304 hydraulic diesel locomotive as its service locomotive. Started in 1996, the service class of this train was changed to business and executive class from the former economy class.

=== Operational (2018–present) ===
On 15 December 2018, the Mutiara Timur operates using a series of stainless steel trains made by PT INKA with class service changes to executive class and premium economy.

Since 10 February 2021 following the enactment of new train travel chart 2021, the Mutiara Timur train route was extended to Yogyakarta Station and only ran at night. As a result, this train gradually became less popular with the average user. Furthermore, its ticket prices became relatively more expensive compared to other trains on the same route, the Wijayakusuma train, which in fact ran longer distances than the Mutiara Timur.

Began end of March 2022, The Mutiara Timur trains have returned to using mild steel trains and have undergone a change in service class, switching to executive and economy plus, similar to the Jayabaya train. This is because the stainless steel trains have been transferred to other train depots that require them, such as the Yogyakarta, Sidotopo, Bandung, and Jakarta Kota train depots. During 2022, the Mutiara Timur train set that was idle at Yogyakarta Station was used for the operation of the Joglosemarkerto Train towards Cilacap or the Bogowonto Train route Lempuyangan–Pasar Senen round trip. Then starting at the end of that year, the Mutiara Timur train set was used for the operation of the Blambangan Express route Banyuwangi–Semarang round trip, resulting in the operation of the Mutiara Timur train being temporarily suspended.

After almost two years of suspended, this train was operated again during the Eid al-Fitr and Eid al-Adha transportation period in 2024. Initially, this train only had economy class services consisting of two types of economy class train facilities, namely the Ministry of Transportation economy class train containing 64 seats that support passengers with disabilities and a modified "new generation" economy class train containing 72 seats. Then, the Ministry of Transportation's economy class train facilities were replaced with executive class.

Since on 1 September 2024, the Mutiara Timur service was reconfigured to business and executive class using the Baturraden Express train, which had temporarily suspended operations. Then, starting 11 and 12 December 2024, the Mutiara Timur train line was replaced by a modified version of the executive and business classes, replacing them with a modified version of the "new generation" executive and economy classes. This train set consists of four to five executive class carriages, three to four economy class carriages, and one dining carriage with power generation facilities.

Starting from the 2025 Chinese New Year holiday, this optional train service will be operated with only executive class service using used Blambangan Express. The trains will consist of six to seven 48-seat mild steel executive cars, one dining car, and one power car. During the 2025 Eid homecoming, one Panoramic train will be added to the optional journey.

== Station ==
Here's route of the Mutiara Timur:

- Surabaya Pasarturi (start/end of regular)
- Surabaya Gubeng (start/end of facultative)
- Wonokromo
- Sidoarjo
- Bangil
- Pasuruan
- Probolinggo
- Klakah
- Tanggul
- Rambi Puji
- Jember
- Kali Baru
- Kali Setail
- Temuguruh
- Rogo Jampi
- Banyuwangi Kota
- Ketapang (start/end)

== Incident ==
- On 20 June 1981 at 05.55 local time, the Mutiara Timur train had an accident before entering Rogojampi. The train derailed and one BW train fell into the river.
- On 7 November 1986 at 13.28, the Mutiara Timur train derailed and overturned about 1 kilometer before entering Tanggul Station. Three passengers suffered serious injuries and 29 others suffered minor injuries. Following the incident, the railway line was closed for two days.
