= Blambangan Express =

Passenger train service between Jakarta and Ketapang (Banyuwangi), Indonesia

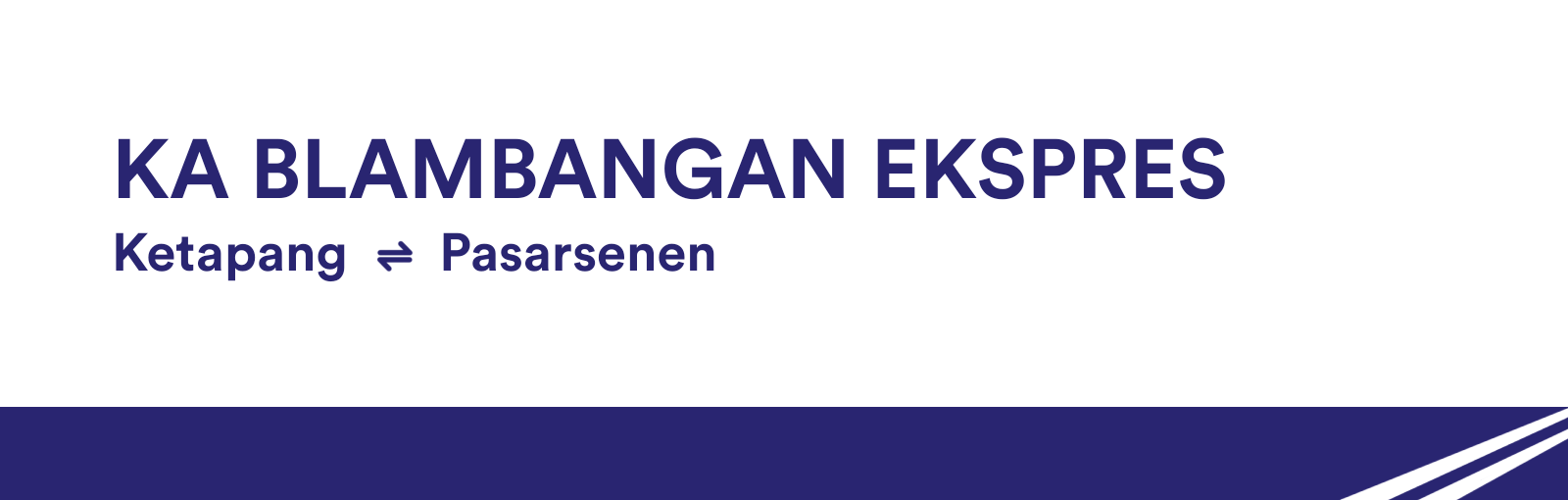

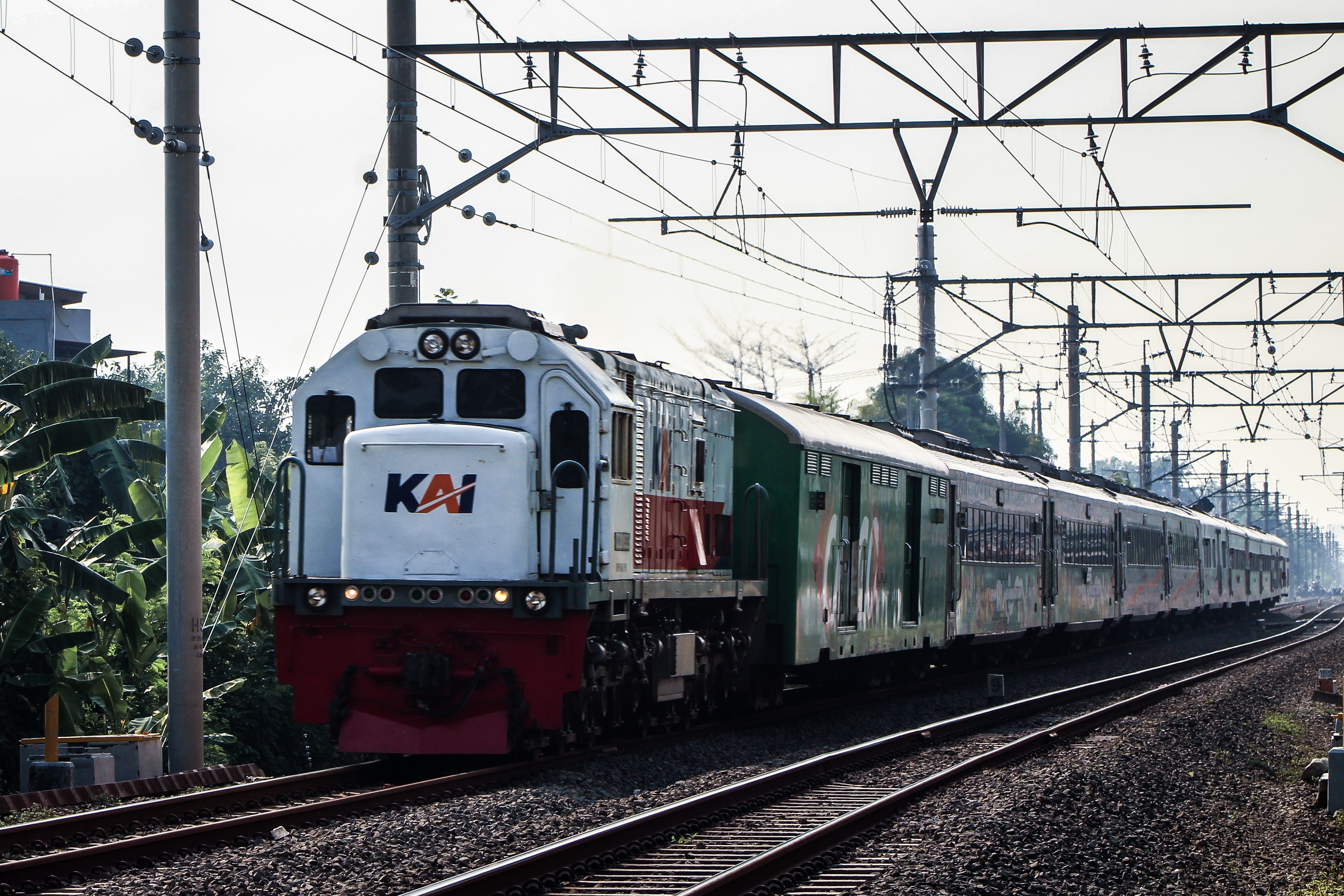
- Blambangan Express passing to Tambun, 2025

Overview
- Service type: Inter-city rail
- Status: Operational
- First service: 2 December 2022
- Current operator: Kereta Api Indonesia

Route
- Termini: Jakarta Pasar Senen; Ketapang
- Distance travelled: 1.031 km (640 mil)
- Average journey time: 16 hours 30 minutes
- Service frequency: Daily each way
- Train number: 145-148

On-board services
- Classes: executive & economy
- Seating arrangements: 50 seats arranged 2-2 (executive class); 72 seats arranged 2-2 (economy class)
- Catering facilities: On-board cafe and trolley service

Technical
- Rolling stock: CC206; CC203; CC201
- Track gauge: 1067 mm
- Operating speed: 70 - 100 km/h (43 - 62 mph)
Route map
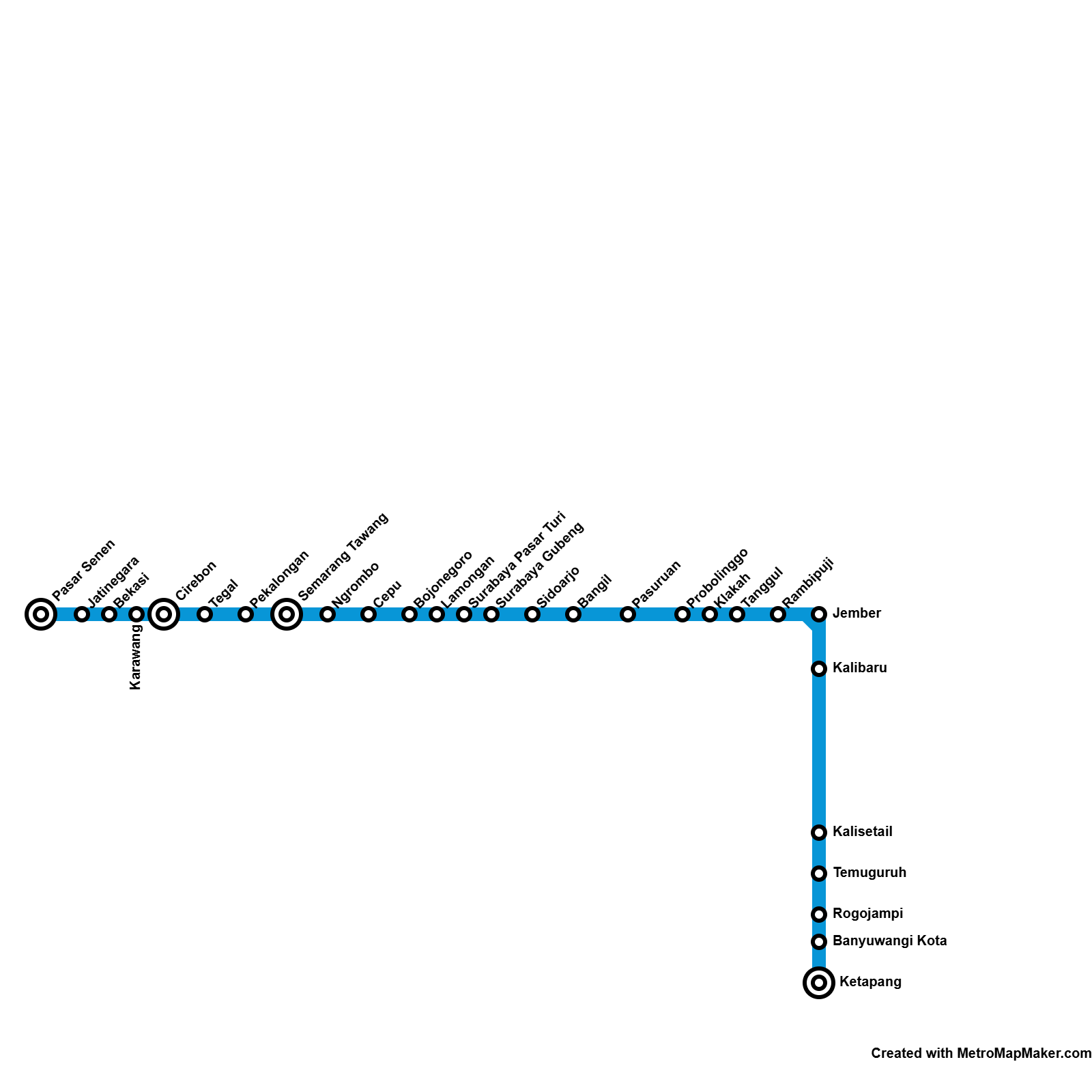

Blambangan Express (Indonesian: Kereta Api Blambangan Ekspres) is an inter-city passenger train operated by Kereta Api Indonesia (KAI) with executive and economy classes. It was introduced on 2 December 2022 as a Semarang Tawang–Ketapang service, and its route was extended to Pasar Senen in July 2024, allowing travel between Jakarta and Banyuwangi without changing trains.

The service runs once daily in each direction. Following the Jakarta extension, it covers about 1,031 km and takes about 16 hours 25 minutes, making it the longest KAI inter-city route to date.

The train is the 2nd the longest travel time after the Sangkuriang which Bandung-Ketapang service since 1 May 2026.

== History ==
KAI announced the Blambangan Express in late November 2022 as a new Semarang–Ketapang round-trip service. The name "Blambangan" was taken from the historic Blambangan Kingdom in eastern Java (Banyuwangi area). KAI stated that the trainset included 4 executive coaches and 3 economy coaches, with 440 seats per trip.

The train began operating on 2 December 2022 with limited operating dates during December (trial/introductory period). KAI also offered promotional fares for departures from 2 to 18 December 2022. One report on the inaugural day noted 150 passengers on the first departure from Semarang, and published the initial timings for the Semarang–Ketapang schedule (18:05 from Semarang; 19:30 from Ketapang). Another report described the service used rolling stock reassigned from the former the former Mutiara Timur operation, with early operations tested on weekends and selected dates.

In July 2024, KAI extended the route from Semarang to Jakarta, launching Ketapang–Pasar Senen on 26 July 2024 and Pasar Senen–Ketapang on 27 July 2024. The new schedule was published as 14:50 from Ketapang (arriving 07:15) and 12:15 from Pasar Senen (arriving 04:55). Also in July 2024, the train began using new generation economy coaches in a modified layout with 72 seats, following refurbishment work carried out at Manggarai Railway Workshop.

From 1 February 2025, the service schedule was adjusted again following the implementation of train travel chart 2025, including updated departure times for the Jakarta–Ketapang and Ketapang–Jakarta trips (for example, departures shown as 12:10 from Pasar Senen and 15:45 from Ketapang in one published schedule).

== Stations ==
Based on published operational information, Blambangan Express serves the following stations:

- Pasar Senen (Start/End)
- Jatinegara
- Bekasi
- Karawang
- Cirebon
- Tegal
- Pekalongan
- Semarang Tawang
- Ngrombo
- Cepu
- Bojonegoro
- Lamongan
- Surabaya Pasarturi
- Surabaya Gubeng
- Sidoarjo
- Bangil
- Pasuruan
- Probolinggo
- Klakah
- Tanggul
- Rambipuji
- Jember
- Kalibaru
- Kalisetail
- Temuguruh
- Rogojampi
- Banyuwangi Kota
- Ketapang (Start/End)

== Incident ==
On 6 March 2026 at 01.49 local time, the Blambangan Express crashes with a truck at level crossing 13 in Probolinggo-Leces section Probolinggo Regency, East Java causing locomotive of the train CC 201 83 53 JR suffered very severe damage to the cabin, resulting in the train driver and assistant driver suffering serious and moderate injuries.

== See also ==
- Sri Tanjung
- Wijayakusuma
- Sangkuriang
- Merak–Ketapang line
