= Sri Tanjung (train) =

Sri Tanjung train

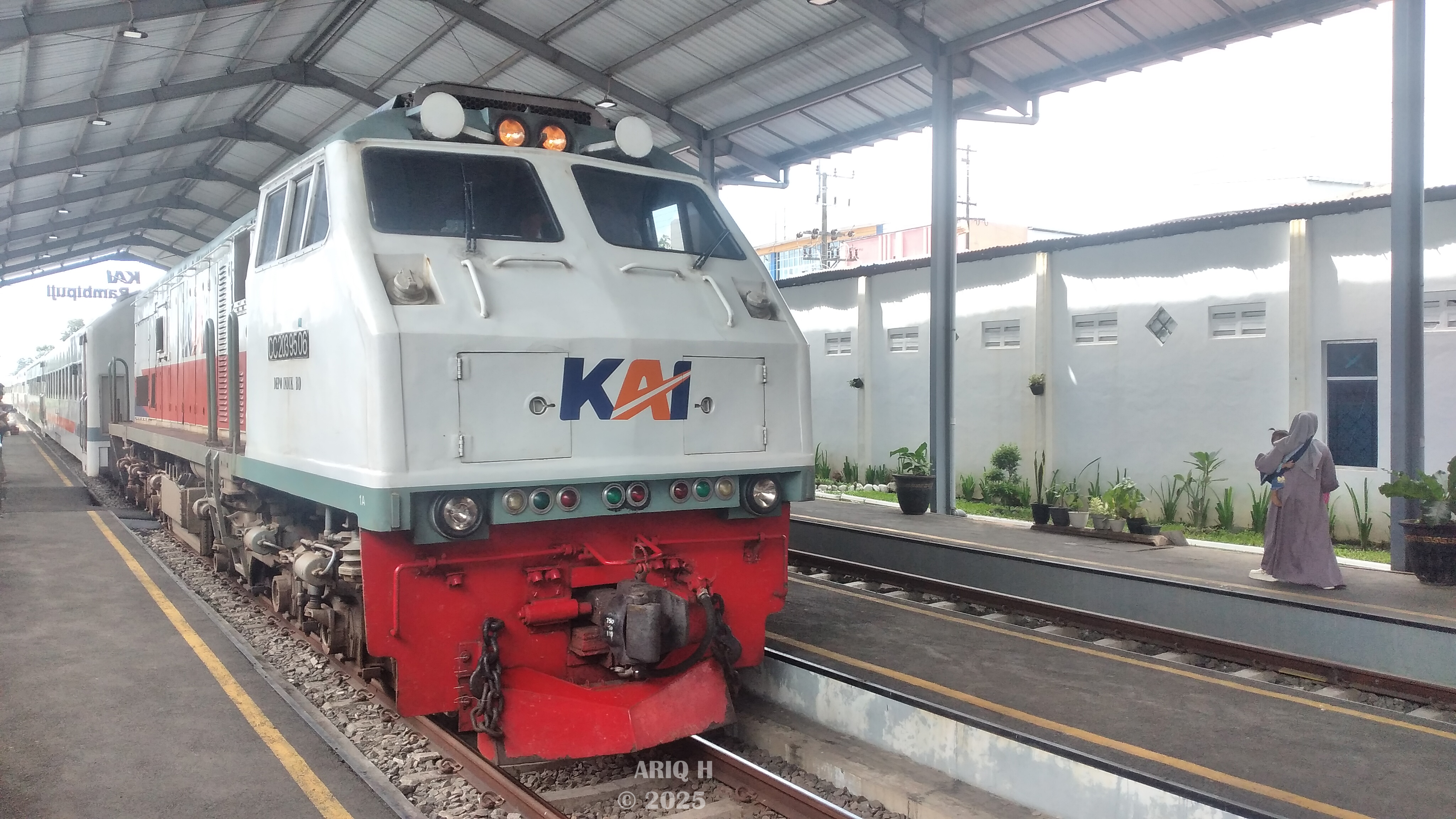
- Sri Tanjung train stopped at Rambipuji, 2025

Overview
- Service type: Inter-city rail
- Status: Operational
- Predecessor: Argopuro (1986-1995)
- First service: 1995
- Current operator: Kereta Api Indonesia

Route
- Termini: Lempuyangan; Ketapang
- Distance travelled: 620 km (385 mil)
- Average journey time: 12 hours 39 minutes
- Service frequency: daily each way
- Train number: 277–280

On-board services
- Class: economy
- Seating arrangements: 106 seats arranged 3-2 (economy)
- Catering facilities: snack, food, & drink service

Technical
- Rolling stock: CC206; CC203; CC201
- Track gauge: 1067 mm
- Operating speed: 60-100 km/h (37-62 mph)
Route map
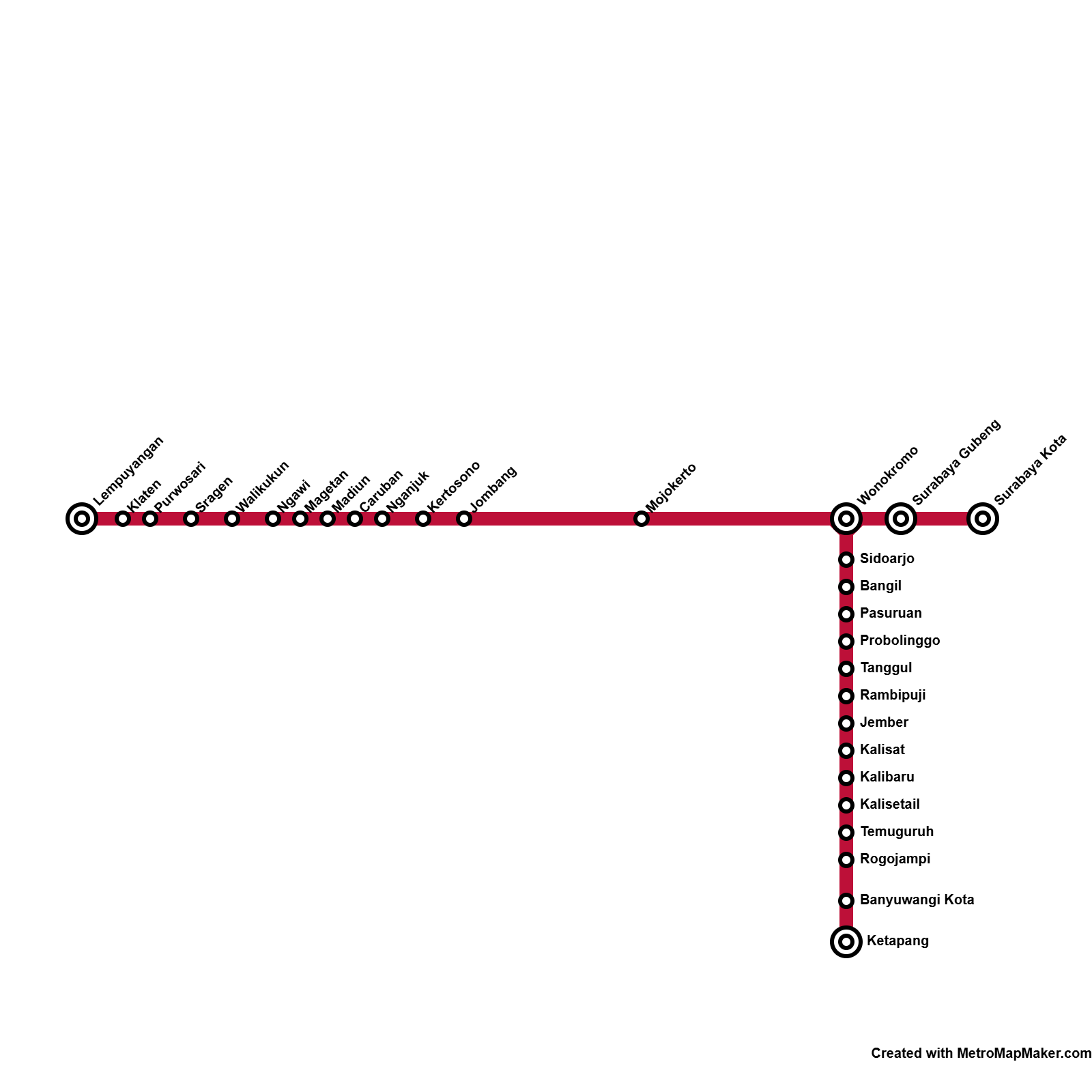

Sri Tanjung train is an passenger train with economy class that is operated by Kereta Api Indonesia between Lempuyangan, Yogyakarta and Ketapang via Surabaya Kota and Wonokromo.

The train offers two trips daily each way morning and night schedule, 620 kilometers (385 miles) in 12 hours 39 minutes.

== Branding ==
The name of the Sri Tanjung train is taken from Sri Tanjung, the wife of Raden Sidapaksa, who is part of the folklore about Banyuwangi Regency.

== History ==
In 1986, the Argopuro train was launched by KAI as the introduction of the Sri Tanjung train. In 1995, the Argopuro changed the name to the Sri Tanjung train due to the name collected from Sri Tanjung as a wife of Raden Sidapaksa which part of the folklore in Banyuwangi Regency, especially the Sri Tanjung train, so as not to be confused with new train service with faster travel times that had started, namely Argo Bromo Anggrek and Argo Gede.

The Sri Tanjung train consists of 7 economy class passenger cars, 1 economy class power dining car, and 1 baggage car.

== Tariff ==
Sri Tanjung train ticket fare range from Rp. 88,000 to Rp. 94,000. depending on the distance traveled.

== Incidents ==
- On 26 October 2012, the Sri Tanjung train hit a Suzuki Carry car that was crossing a level crossing 200 meters east of Mangli Station, dragging it all the way to the station. As a result, the car's body was crushed and the driver was seriously injured and suffered broken ribs.
- On 24 June 2013 at 07.00, the Sri Tanjung train collided with a truck, causing the train to derail and the truck to suffer severe damage.
- On 17 August 2020, at around 1:05 PM, the Sri Tanjung train hit a Kijang LGX train with the license plate number L 1197 KA at the Gilang crossing, Taman, Sidoarjo. The car was dragged for 27 meters. This incident resulted in three deaths and two injuries.
- On 28 June 2023, at 07:04, the Sri Tanjung train collided with a Honda Mobilio at an unmarked crossing in Klatak, Kalipuro, Banyuwangi. Both passengers survived but sustained injuries.
- On 28 May 2025, at approximately 14:15, the Sri Tanjung train collided with a Vario motorcycle with license plate number W 6729 NI under the Jenggolo Flyover in Buduran, Sidoarjo. One person died at the scene, and the collision caused a 23-minute delay for the Sri Tanjung train.

== List of stations ==
The Sri Tanjung train as a favorite by foreign tourists that from Lempuyangan, Yogyakarta to Bali via train, the schedule of the Sri Tanjung train was busiest.

- Lempuyangan (Start/End)
- Klaten
- Purwosari
- Sragen
- Walikukun
- Ngawi
- Magetan
- Madiun
- Caruban
- Nganjuk
- Kertosono
- Jombang
- Mojokerto
- Wonokromo
- Surabaya Gubeng
- Surabaya Kota (for car curtains of locomotive to Yogyakarta or Banyuwangi)
- Sidoarjo
- Bangil
- Pasuruan
- Probolinggo
- Tanggul
- Rambipuji
- Jember
- Kalisat
- Kalibaru
- Kalisetail
- Temuguruh
- Rogojampi
- Banyuwangi Kota
- Ketapang (Start/End)
