= Wijayakusuma =

Executive and premium economy class train in Indonesia

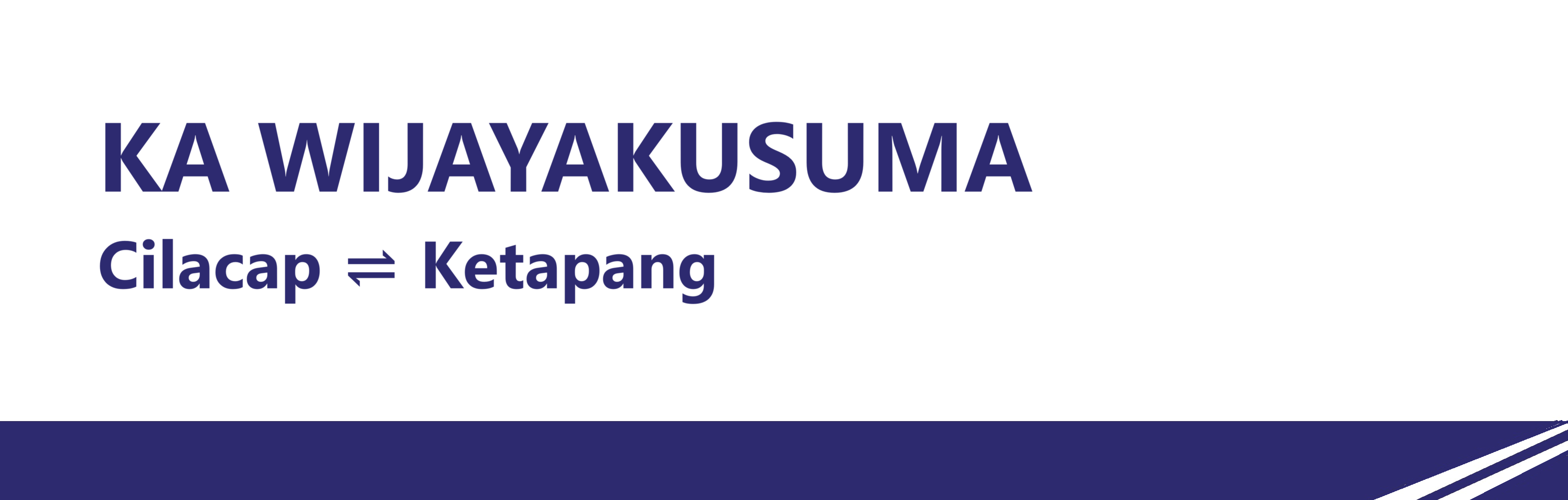

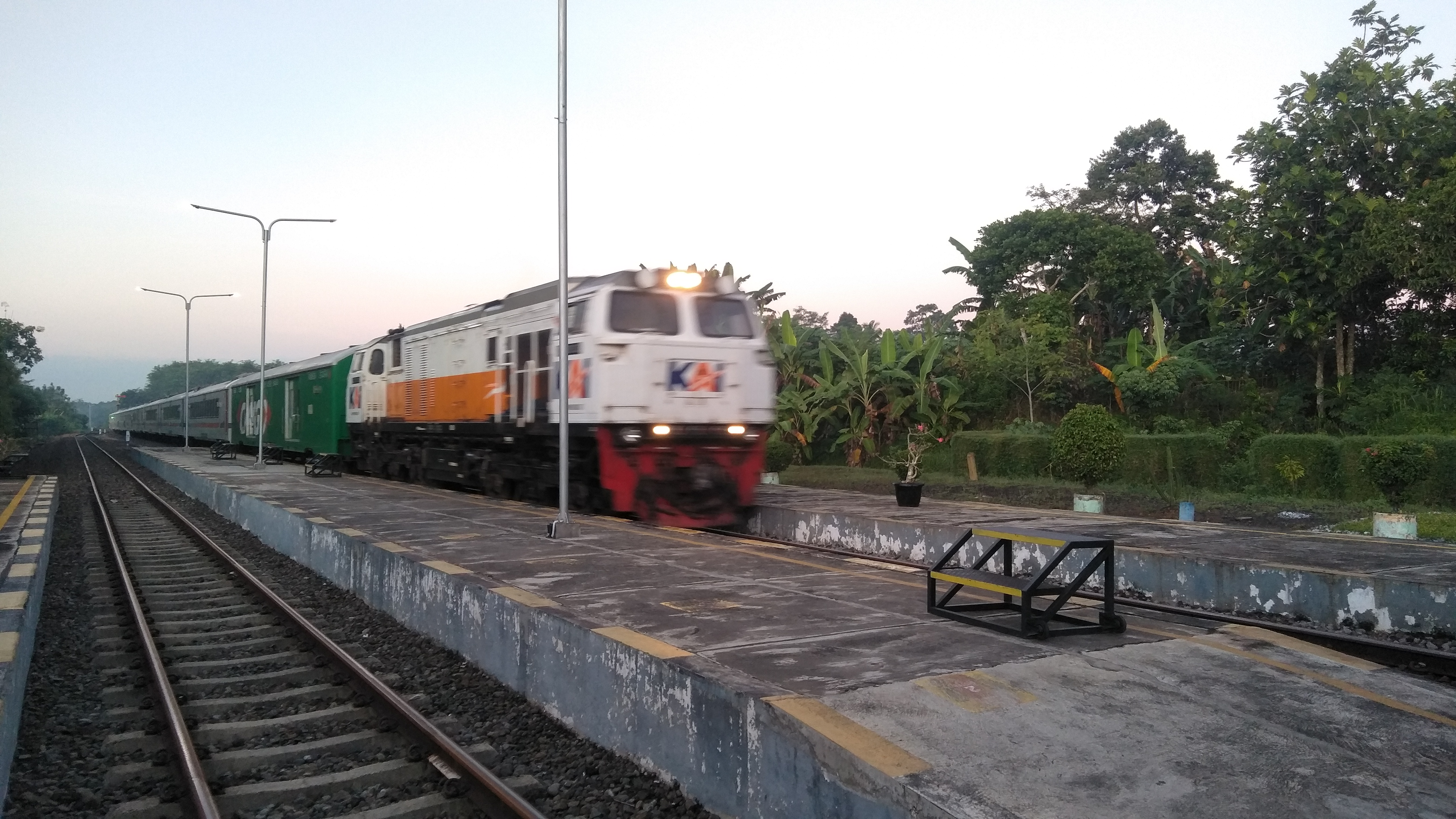
- Wijayakusuma entering Banyuwangi, 2023

Overview
- Service type: Inter-city rail
- Status: Operational
- First service: 26 September 2017; 8 years ago
- Current operator: Kereta Api Indonesia

Route
- Termini: Cilacap; Ketapang
- Distance travelled: 788 km (489 mil)
- Average journey time: 14 hours 15 minutes
- Service frequency: 2x Daily each way
- Train number: 157-160

On-board services
- Classes: premium economy & executive
- Seating arrangements: 50 seats arranged 2-2 (executive class); 64 seats arranged 2-2 (premium economy)
- Catering facilities: On-board cafe and trolley service

Technical
- Rolling stock: CC206
- Track gauge: 1067 mm
- Operating speed: 60-100 km/h (37-62 mph)
Route map
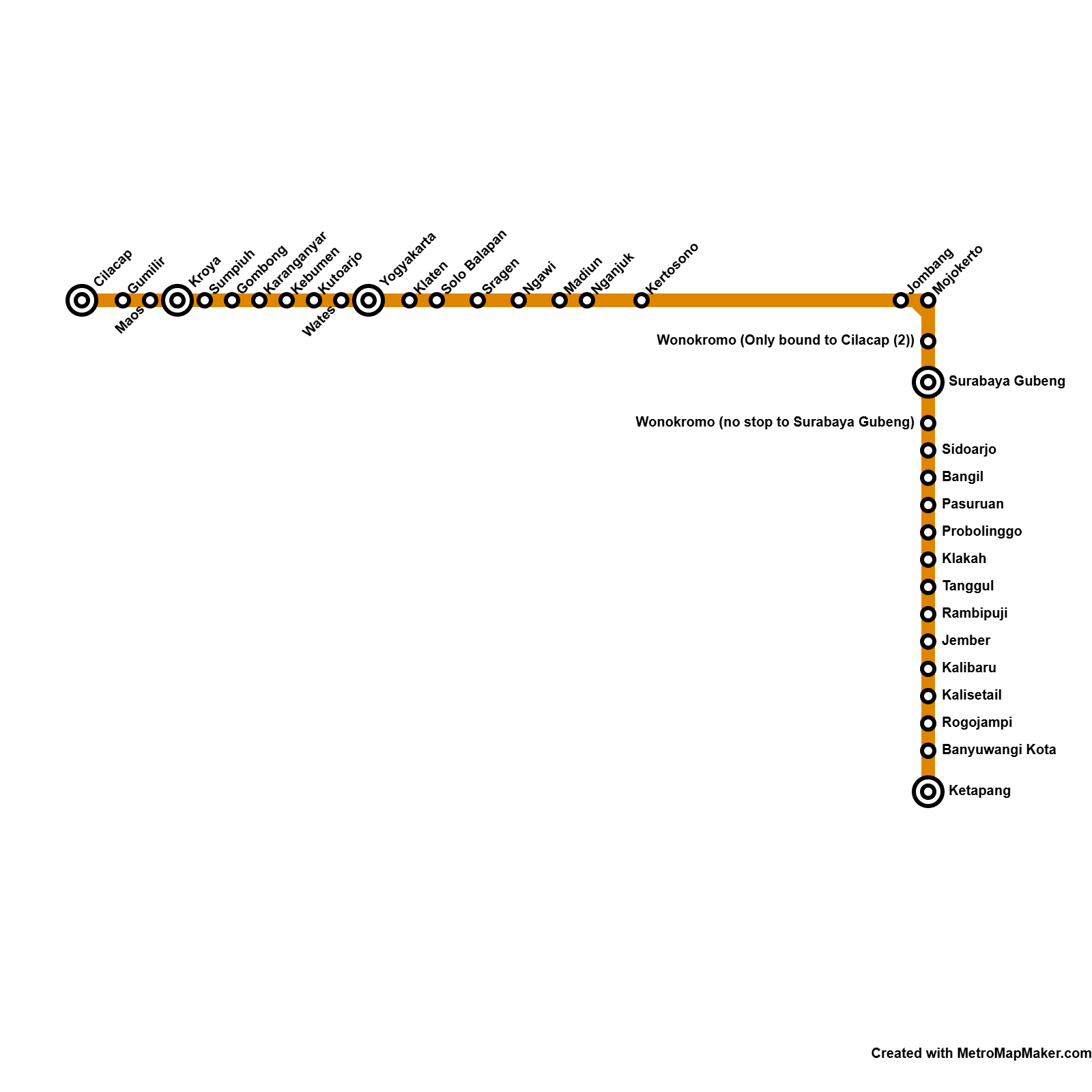

Wijayakusuma is an passenger train with the premium economy & executive class that operated by Kereta Api Indonesia which run between Cilacap & Ketapang via Yogyakarta & Surabaya Gubeng.

In the January–September 2024 period, this train became the commercial train service with the highest occupancy in Indonesia, reaching 193%.

== Etymology ==
The word and name of Wijayakusuma is taken from the type of flower Wijayakusuma (Flower), with the scientific name Epiphyllum oxypetalum. In Javanese mythology, this flower is believed to be a sacred flower that can bring the dead back to life. This flower is a characteristic of Cilacap Regency, which is stated in the regional motto, namely "Jala Bhumi Wijayakusuma Çakti" in Sanskrit, which means "The ability to cultivate the earth, sea, and water for prosperity".

== History ==
The Wijayakusuma train was first operated between Cilacap and Solo Balapan via Yogyakarta on 26 September 2017 to increase passenger train services to Cilacap Station, which at that time was still very limited.

On 1 September 2018, the Wijayakusuma train was extended to Ketapang Station with the addition of executive class services.

This train set was also loaned for the operation of the Joglosemarkerto Train route Yogyakarta–Cilacap round trip. Its inaugural trip from Cilacap Station to Yogyakarta Station started on 25 February 2022 and has been running regularly every day.

The Wijayakusuma train series consists of four to five executive trains, three premium economy trains, one power dining train and one baggage train.

== List of the station ==
On 1 February 2025, the Wijayakusuma train was connecting between Cilacap & Banyuwangi due the passenger went to Bali via train from Cilacap.

- Cilacap (Start/End)
- Gumilir
- Maos
- Kroya
- Sumpiuh
- Gombong
- Karanganyar
- Kebumen
- Kutoarjo
- Wates
- Yogyakarta
- Klaten
- Solo Balapan
- Sragen
- Ngawi
- Madiun
- Nganjuk
- Kertosono
- Jombang
- Mojokerto
- Wonokromo (only bound to Cilacap)
- Surabaya Gubeng (for car curtains of locomotive to Cilacap or Banyuwangi)
- Sidoarjo
- Bangil
- Pasuruan
- Probolinggo
- Klakah
- Tanggul
- Rambipuji
- Jember
- Kalibaru
- Kalisetail
- Rogojampi
- Banyuwangi Kota
- Ketapang (Start/End)

== Incident ==
- On 5 November 2019 at 21.52 WIB, the Wijayakusuma train bound for Cilacap derailed when it was about to enter West Station (now Magetan Station). There were no fatalities or injuries in this incident, but 13 trains bound for various destinations were delayed at several stations due to the evacuation process.

== See also ==
- Pandalungan (train)
