= Argo Anjasmoro =

Passenger train Jakarta - Surabaya facultative service in Indonesia

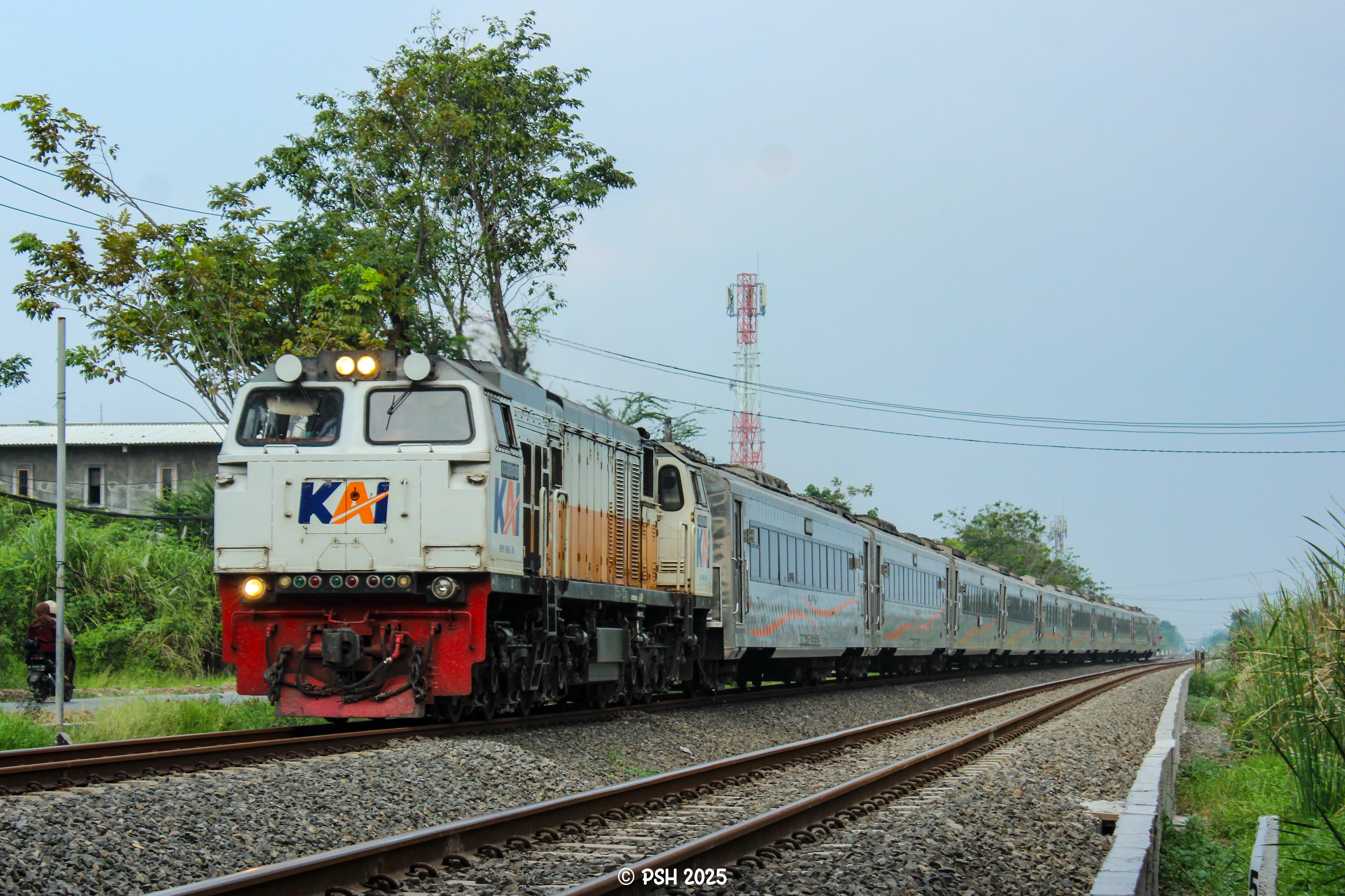
- Argo Anjasmoro under the flyover of Tanjungmas–Srondol Toll Road, Semarang

Overview
- Service type: Inter-city rail
- Status: Operational (facultative)
- Locale: Operational Area I Jakarta
- Predecessor: Anjasmoro train (PSE-JG route via YK; 2019-2021)
- First service: 20 March 2025
- Current operator: Kereta Api Indonesia

Route
- Termini: Gambir; Surabaya Pasarturi
- Distance travelled: 720 kilometres (450 miles)
- Average journey time: 9 hours 5 minutes
- Service frequency: daily each way
- Train number: 29F-30F

On-board services
- Class: executive
- Seating arrangements: 50 seats arranged 2-2 (executive class)
- Catering facilities: On-board cafe and trolley service

Technical
- Rolling stock: CC206/CC203
- Track gauge: 1,067 mm
- Operating speed: 90–120 kilometres per hour (56–75 mph)
Route map
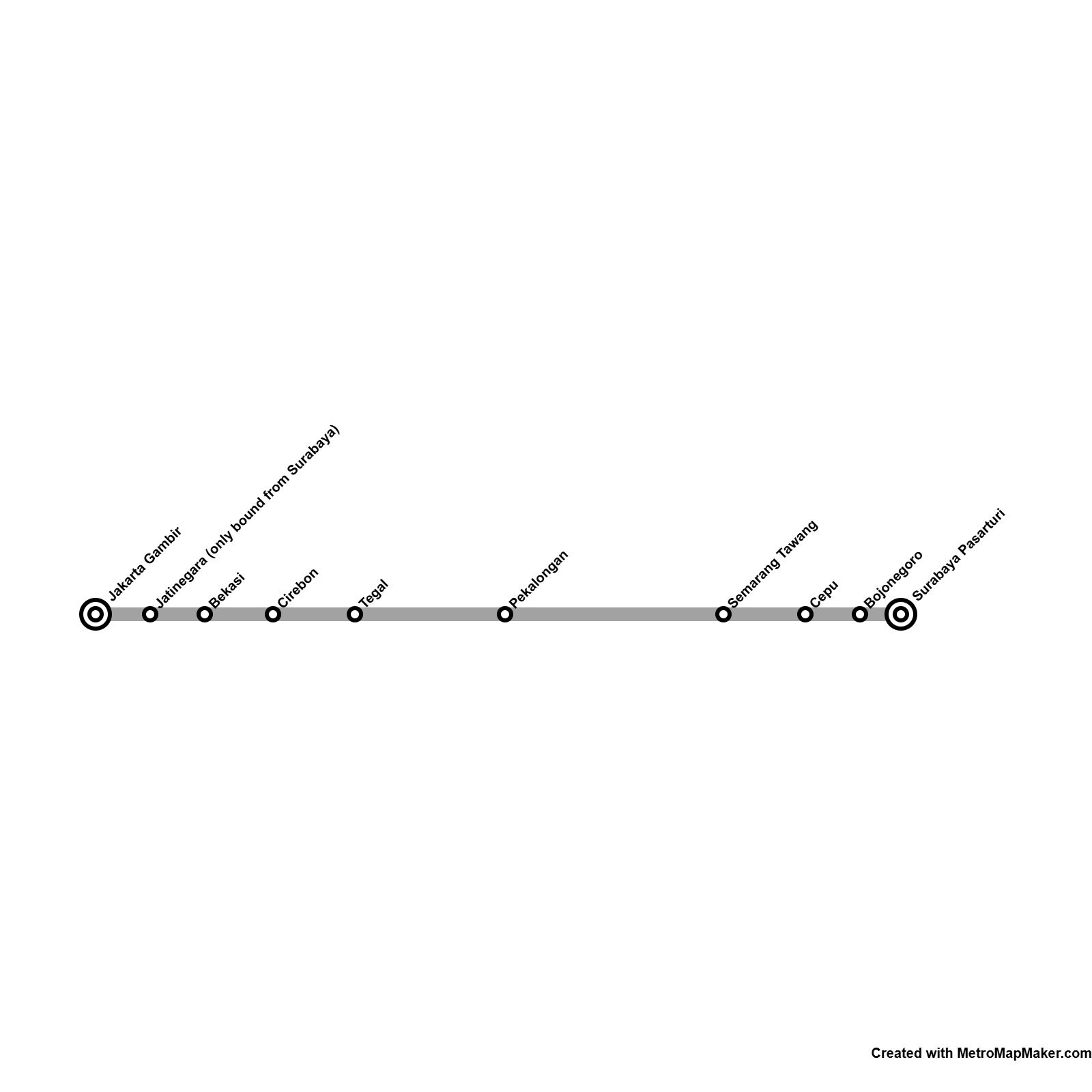

Argo Anjasmoro is an passenger train with the executive class that is operated by Kereta Api Indonesia which between Gambir and Surabaya Pasarturi. The trip will time around 720 km (450 mil) in 9 hours 5 minutes, this train as a facultative service that meaning only the certain day, like Ramadan, Eid al-Fitr, and other day only few operated for support of the Argo Bromo Anggrek and Sembrani.

However, In between September, October, and November 2025, the Argo Anjasmoro continues to operate every day for the schedule before to December.

== Etymology ==
The word Argo (Javanese for "mountain") is a brand name used for executive train services operated by Kereta Api Indonesia. The Argo Anjasmoro is named after a mountain range in East Java. The Anjasmoro Mountains are located in five regions, namely Jombang Regency, Kediri Regency, Mojokerto Regency, Malang Regency, and Batu City. The mountain range has the highest peak, Mount Anjasmoro, at an altitude of 2,372 meters above sea level.

== History ==
=== Introduction ===
On 1 December 2019 following the enactment of new train travel chart 2019, The brand name Anjasmoro is used by the Anjasmoro train which serves the Pasar Senen–Jombang line via the southern Java line (via Cirebon–Yogyakarta), with executive and economy classes. The train uses an interchange operating pattern with the Jayabaya, the Anjasmoro train sets are allocated by Jakarta Kota Train Depot.

The Anjasmoro train underwent rebranding to Bangunkarta train on the enactment of new train travel chart 2021 which took effect from 10 February 2021.

=== Argo Anjasmoro (present) ===
On the enactment of new train travel chart 2025, The brand name Anjasmoro was reused for an executive class Argo service called the Argo Anjasmoro, with the relation Gambir–Surabaya Pasarturi via the northern line of Java to replace the train service from Sembrani additional train.

This train will start operating on 20 March 2025, which coincides with the 2025 Eid al-Fitr holiday period.

=== Operational ===
The Argo Anjasmoro is included in the enactment of new train travel chart 2025 and began operating on 20 March 2025. With an average travel time in 9 hours and 5 minutes, this train is the only executive class Argo train with optional status. According to the enactment of new train travel chart 2025, the Argo Anjasmoro consists of eight executive cars, one dining car, and one power car. These cars are allocated by Cipinang Train Depot.

The Argo Anjasmoro uses the latest generation of stainless steel trains manufactured by PT INKA. This is a temporary operation before the company returns to using 1st generation stainless steel.

== Station ==
Here's route of the Argo Anjasmoro is:

- Surabaya Pasarturi (Start/End)
- Bojonegoro
- Cepu
- Semarang Tawang
- Pekalongan
- Tegal
- Cirebon
- Bekasi
- Jatinegara (only bound from Surabaya)
- Gambir (Start/End)

== See also ==
- Argo Bromo Anggrek
- Sembrani
- Argo Semeru
- Bima
