= Corridor coach =

Type of railway passenger coach

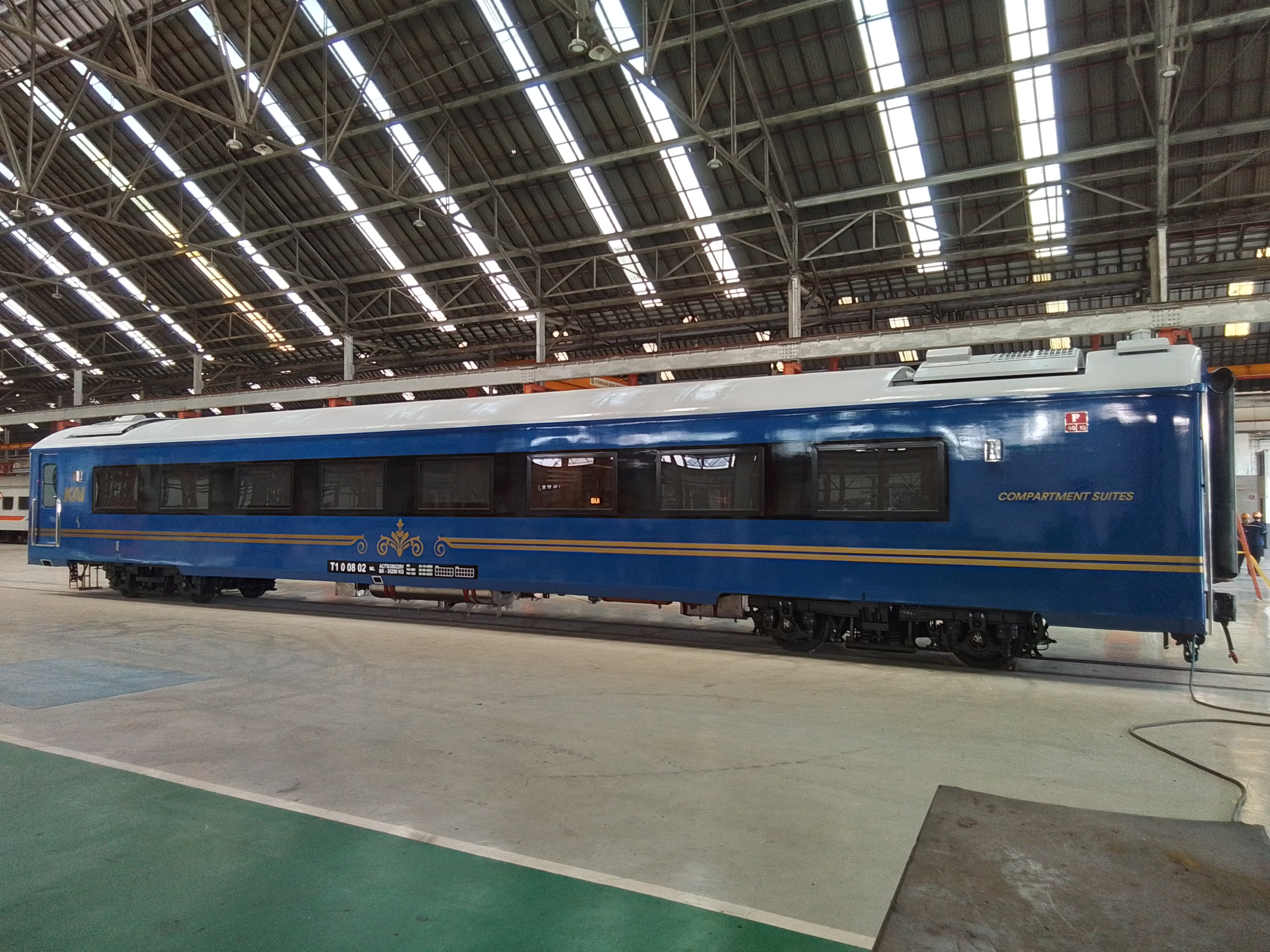
An Indonesian compartment suite coach for Bima, Argo Semeru, Argo Bromo Anggrek, and Sangkuriang Train, which is considered as "corridor coach", rather than "compartment coach"

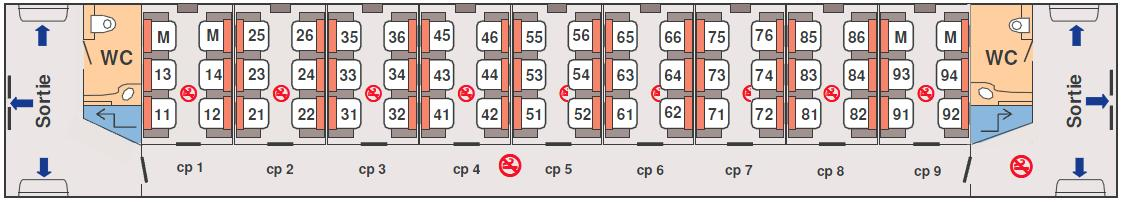
Diagram of a French corridor coach (SNCF A9u)

A corridor coach is a type of railway passenger coach divided into compartments and having a corridor down one side of the coach to allow free movement along the train and between compartments.

The idea of connecting railway coaches by means of an interior corridor and exterior platform at each end dates to at least 1865, when a patent was obtained by William Chubb and Solomon Fry of Bristol. This concept was first applied in Britain around the start of the 20th century, because the advent of dining cars made it advantageous to enable passengers to move down the length of a train. This was achieved by linking the corridors of adjacent coaches using a "corridor connector". The "Standard Corridor" thus became one of the standard mid-20th century designs of railway carriage.

The corridor coach was known on the European continent as the American system or American coach in the early 1900s.

== See also ==
- British Rail coach type codes
- Corridor (rail vehicle)
- Soft sleeper
