= Sembung railway station =

Railway station in Indonesia

Sembung Station Stasiun Sembung
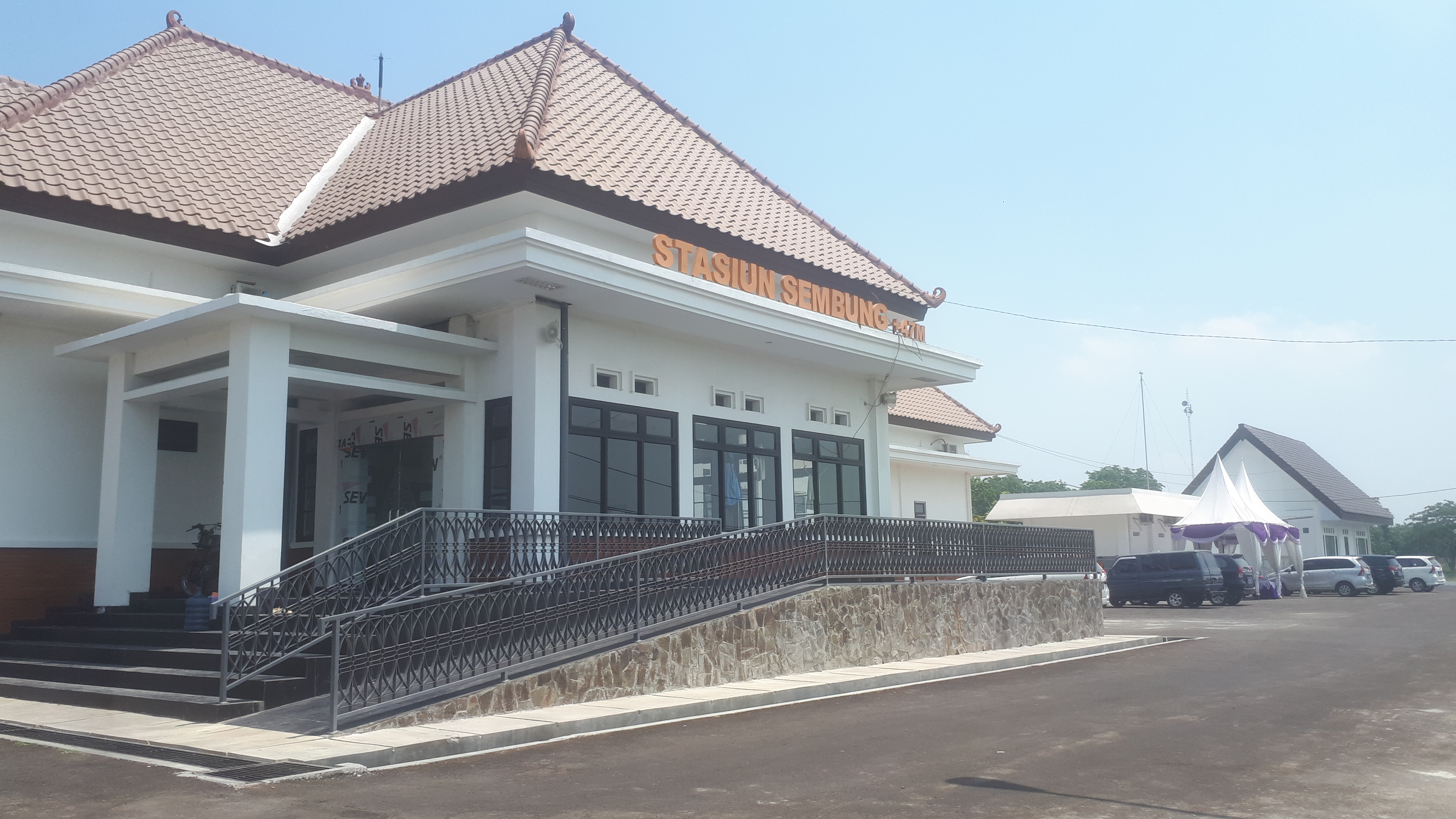
- Sembung railway station's new building, 2019

General information
- Location: Jombang–Kertosono Road; Sembung, Perak, Jombang Regency; East Java; Indonesia
- Coordinates: 7°34′58″S 112°10′2″E
- Elevation: +47 m (154 ft)
- Operator: Kereta Api Indonesia
- Line: Kertosono–Wonokromo
- Platforms: 1 side platform 2 island platforms
- Tracks: 4

Construction
- Structure type: Ground
- Parking: Available
- Accessible: Available

Other information
- Station code: SMB
- Classification: Third-class station

History
- Rebuilt: 30 October 2019

Services
Preceding station		Following station
Jombang One-way operation	Commuter Line Dhoho SB-SB East Java Circular Line (counter-clockwise)	Kertosono towards
Jombang One-way operation	Commuter Line Dhoho SB-ML East Java Circular Line (counter-clockwise)	Kertosono towards
Jombang One-way operation	Commuter Line Dhoho SB-BL East Java Circular Line (counter-clockwise)	Kertosono towards
Jombang One-way operation	Commuter Line Dhoho East Java Circular Line (counter-clockwise)	Kertosono towards Kertosono, Blitar, Malang or Surabaya Kota
Kertosono One-way operation	Commuter Line Penataran SB-SB East Java Circular Line (clockwise)	Jombang towards
Kertosono One-way operation	Commuter Line Penataran ML-SB East Java Circular Line (clockwise)	Jombang towards
Kertosono One-way operation	Commuter Line Penataran BL-SB East Java Circular Line (clockwise)	Jombang towards
Kertosono One-way operation	Commuter Line Penataran East Java Circular Line (clockwise)	Jombang towards Surabaya Kota
Location
- Location within Java

Sembung Station (Indonesian: Stasiun Sembung, station code: SMB) is a third-class railway station in Sembung, Perak, Jombang Regency, East Java, Indonesia, operated by Kereta Api Indonesia. This railway station is at the most western railway station in Jombang Regency. This station is located Jalan Raya Sembung, 100 m south of Jombang–Kertosono Road. This station's new building is operated—which has four tracks (two main lines and two passing tracks)—since Jombang–Baron double track segment activation on 30 October 2019.

== Services ==
This railway station has no train services except for train overtaking.

Preceding station	Kereta Api Indonesia	Following station
Kertosono; Terminus	Kertosono–Wonokromo	Jombang towards Wonokromo
