= Jayakarta (train) =

Jayakarta train based from the Jakarta's past in Banten Sultanate era

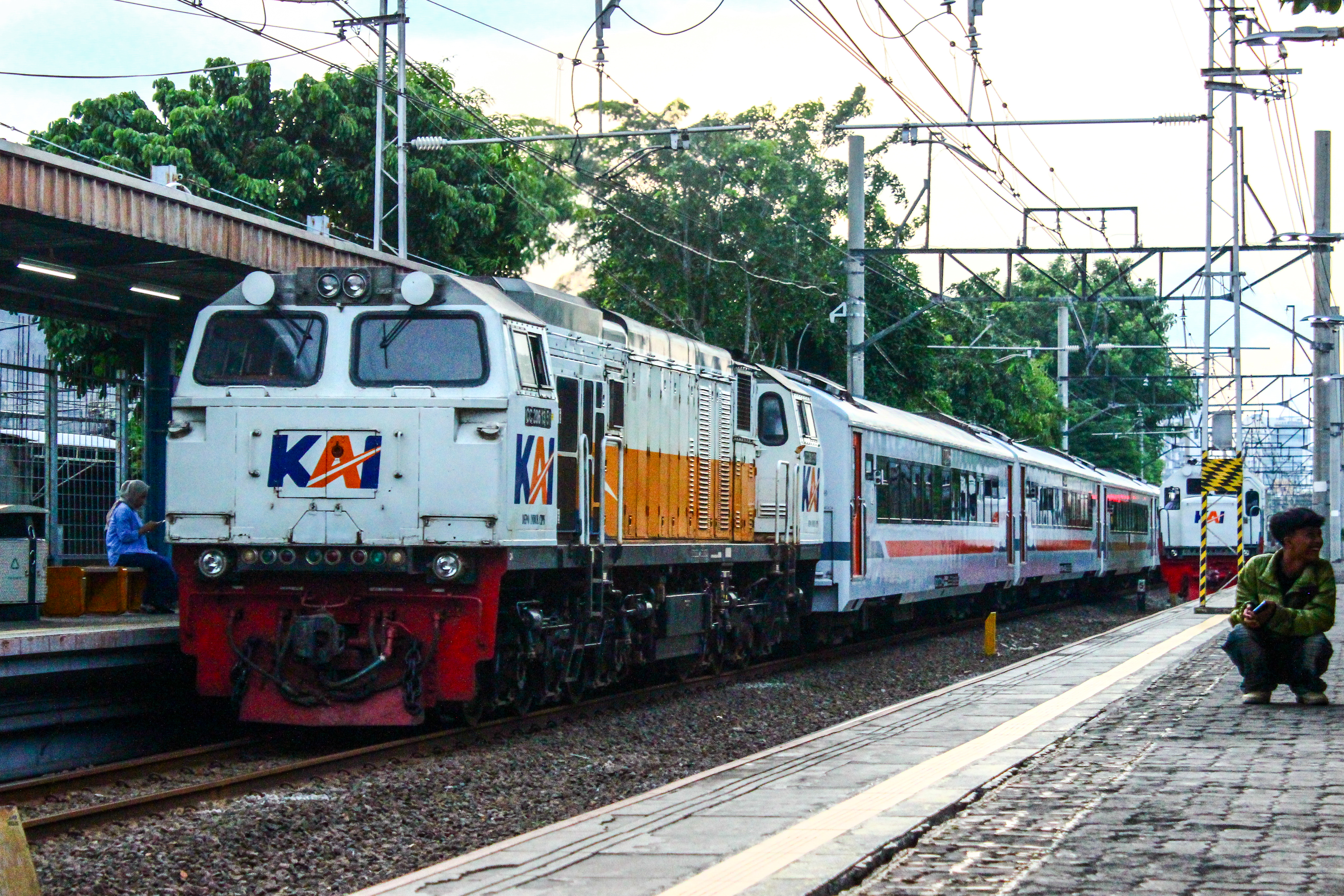
- Jayakarta train passing in Gang Sentiong, 2024

Overview
- Service type: Inter-city rail
- Status: Operational
- Locale: Operational Area I Jakarta
- Predecessor: Jayabaya Selatan (1990-2007); GBMS Premium (2017)
- First service: 28 September 2017
- Current operator: Kereta Api Indonesia

Route
- Termini: Surabaya Gubeng; Pasar Senen
- Distance travelled: 820 kilometres (510 miles)
- Average journey time: 12 hours 47 minutes
- Service frequency: daily each way
- Train number: 251-252

On-board services
- Class: premium economy
- Seating arrangements: 80 seats arranged 2-2 (premium economy class)
- Catering facilities: On-board cafe and trolley service

Technical
- Rolling stock: CC206
- Track gauge: 1,067 mm
- Operating speed: 80–120 kilometres per hour (50–75 mph)
Route map

Jayakarta is an Indonesian inter-city passenger train operated by Kereta Api Indonesia (KAI). It provides premium economy class service between Pasar Senen in Jakarta and Surabaya Gubeng in Surabaya via the southern Java route, serving cities in Central and East Java such as Purwokerto, Yogyakarta or Lempuyangan and Madiun. The train usually operates with ten premium economy coaches, giving a total of 768 seats that include cars equipped for passengers with disabilities.

== History ==
Before the introduction of Jayakarta Premium, long distance services on the Jakarta–Surabaya corridor included the Jayabaya Selatan train. That service ran between 1989 and 2006 using the southern route with a journey time of around 17 hours and was later withdrawn after passengers shifted to faster alternatives such as the newer Jayabaya on the northern double track line, which reduced the journey time to about 13 hours.

The direct predecessor of the Jayakarta train on the Pasar Senen–Surabaya Gubeng route was Gaya Baru Malam Selatan Premium, which KAI operated as an facultative service during peak periods such as long weekends and major holidays. Strong passenger demand and consistently high seat occupancy led KAI to change the status of this facultative service into a regular daily train and to give it a new name, Jayakarta Premium, as part of the celebrations for the company's 72nd anniversary. The inaugural run under the new name was scheduled for 28 September 2017, departing from Pasar Senen and serving the same corridor to Surabaya Gubeng.

The train formation at launch consisted of eight premium economy (K3) coaches with 80 seats in each car and two premium economy coaches with 64 seats configured for passengers with disabilities, giving a total capacity of 768 seats per journey. Although classified as economy class, the interior uses reclining 2+2 seating with wider legroom than conventional economy coaches, luggage racks similar to those found on aircraft, air conditioning and on board entertainment screens, so the ride experience is marketed as comparable to executive class facilities. The train was planned to depart from Pasar Senen at 13.20 and arrive at Surabaya Gubeng at 03.47, while the opposite working was scheduled to leave Surabaya Gubeng at 15.00 and arrive back at Pasar Senen at 05.30.

The name "Jayakarta" is taken from an earlier name for Jakarta. The term was used for the port that later became Jakarta after forces from the Demak Sultanate under Fatahillah expelled the Portuguese from Sunda Kelapa in 1527, and KAI selected it for the train to reflect the Jakarta origin of the service.

On 29 May 2019, Jakarta Kota station began to handle certain long distance departures in order to relieve congestion at Pasar Senen, and Jayakarta Premium was one of the trains reassigned so that passengers could also board from Jakarta Kota.

From 26 September 2023 KAI began introducing modified economy coaches referred to as the "New Generation" on the Jayakarta service. This configuration combines four executive class (K1) cars, five New Generation economy (K3 NG) cars and one dining and generator car (MP3). The New Generation economy coaches are rebuilt from earlier 80 seat economy cars and now have 72 captain seat style reclining seats per coach with increased legroom, brighter interiors, redesigned luggage racks, upgraded toilets and a public information display system showing time and temperature. In this arrangement, Jayakarta runs between Pasar Senen and Malang via Surabaya with one daily round trip using the mixed executive and New Generation economy formation.

== Stations ==
When introduced as a regular service, Jayakarta served the following stations on the Pasar Senen–Surabaya Gubeng route:

- Pasar Senen (start/end)
- Jatibarang
- Cirebon
- Bumiayu
- Purwokerto
- Randegan
- Kroya
- Tambak
- Karanganyar
- Kebumen
- Wonosari
- Prembun
- Kutoarjo
- Lempuyangan
- Klaten
- Solo Balapan
- Masaran
- Walikukun
- Paron
- Madiun
- Nganjuk
- Baron
- Kertosono
- Jombang
- Mojokerto
- Surabaya Gubeng (start/end)
