= Jombang railway station =

Railway station in Indonesia

Jombang Station Stasiun Jombang
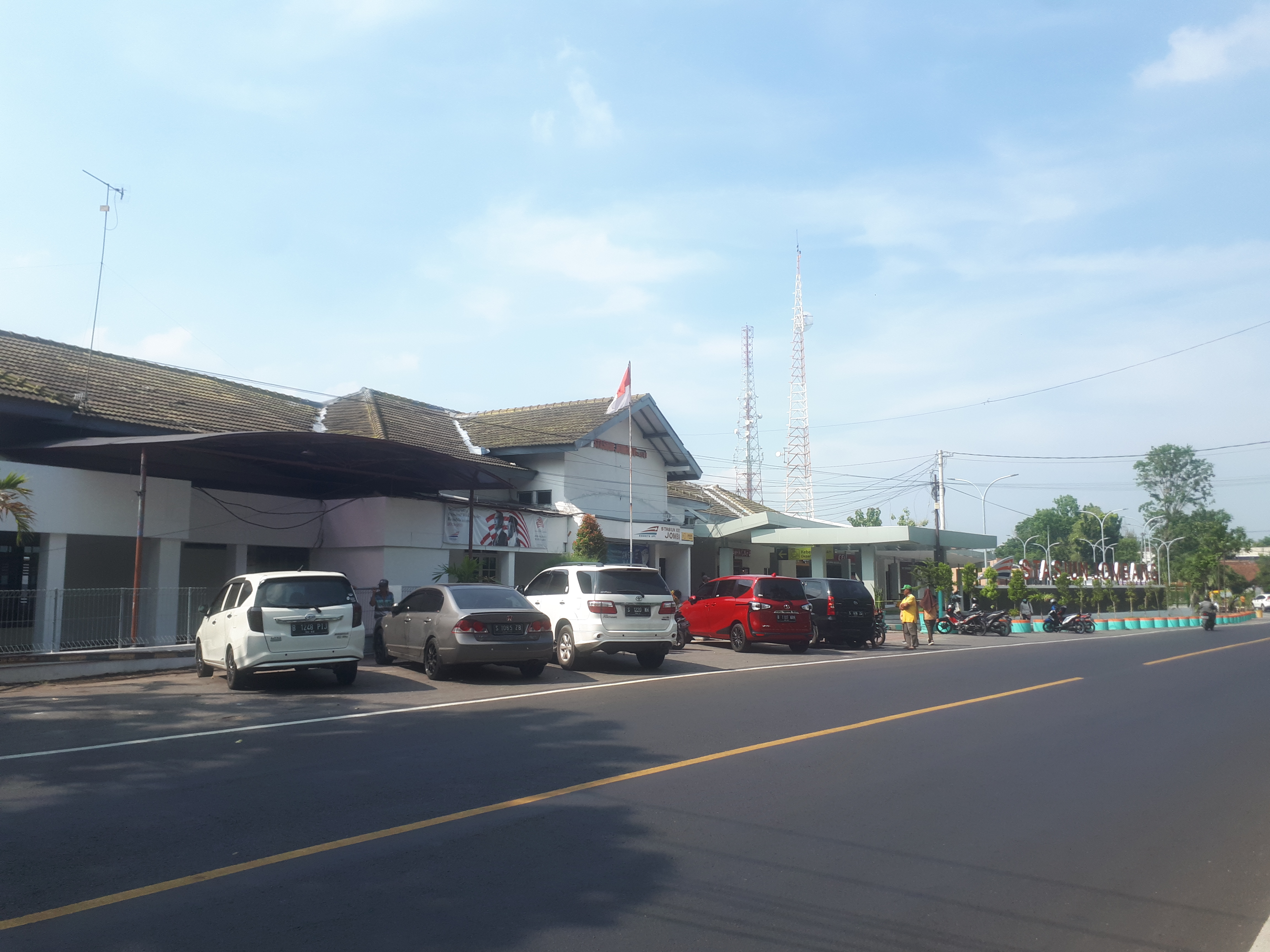
- Jombang Station

General information
- Location: Jl. Jenderal Basuki Rachmat No. 1, Jombatan, Jombang, Jombang Regency; East Java; Indonesia
- Coordinates: 7.558174°S 112.233592°E
- Elevation: +43 m (141 ft)
- Owner: Kereta Api Indonesia
- Operator: Kereta Api Indonesia
- Line: Kertosono–Wonokromo
- Platforms: 1 side platform 4 island platforms
- Tracks: 8

Construction
- Structure type: Ground
- Parking: Available
- Accessible: Available

Other information
- Station code: JG
- Classification: Large class type C

History
- Opened: 27 February 1881

Services
Preceding station		Following station
Peterongan One-way operation	Commuter Line Dhoho SB-SB East Java Circular Line (counter-clockwise)	Sembung towards
Peterongan One-way operation	Commuter Line Dhoho SB-ML East Java Circular Line (counter-clockwise)	Sembung towards
Peterongan One-way operation	Commuter Line Dhoho SB-BL East Java Circular Line (counter-clockwise)	Sembung towards
Peterongan One-way operation	Commuter Line Dhoho East Java Circular Line (counter-clockwise)	Sembung towards Kertosono, Blitar, Malang or Surabaya Kota
Sembung One-way operation	Commuter Line Penataran SB-SB East Java Circular Line (clockwise)	Peterongan towards
Sembung One-way operation	Commuter Line Penataran ML-SB East Java Circular Line (clockwise)	Peterongan towards
Sembung One-way operation	Commuter Line Penataran BL-SB East Java Circular Line (clockwise)	Peterongan towards
Sembung One-way operation	Commuter Line Penataran East Java Circular Line (clockwise)	Peterongan towards Surabaya Kota
Location
- Location within Java

Jombang Station (JG) is a large class type C railway station located in Jombatan, Jombang, Jombang Regency, the station is included in the Operation Area VII Madiun at an altitude of +43 m. The location of this station is right across the Alun-alun Jombang. All trains passing the Kertosono-Surabaya Gubeng must stop at this station.

== Building and layout ==
Jombang Station initially had nine train lines with line 2 being a straight line, but only lines 1–3 were used frequently. After double track operated from this station to Baron as of 30 October 2019 and then until Mojokerto as of 26 October 2020, the track layout was changed. The old line 4 has been dismantled to expand the middle platform, leaving only eight lanes. Line 2 is used as a straight line in the Kertosono direction, line 3 is used as a straight line for Wonokromo, and the old line 8 which was previously a turning line is changed to the new line 7 as a badug track. In addition, a new canopy was added to cover the new line 4 and the old electric signaling system (Ansaldo type) has been replaced with the latest electric signaling produced by PT Len Industri.

This station is equipped with a waiting room (there is an executive waiting room) and a platform that is high enough to make it easier for passengers to get on and off the train.

From this station, there used to be a fork to the north from line 1 to Ploso – Babat and from the old line 5 to Kediri via Pare.

== Services ==
The following is a list of train services at the Jombang Station.

=== Passenger services ===
- Executive class
  - Argo Wilis, to Bandung via Madiun-Solo Balapan-Yogyakarta-Tasikmalaya and to Surabaya Gubeng.
  - Bima & Argo Semeru, to Gambir via Madiun-Solo Balapan-Yogyakarta-Purwokerto-Cirebon and to Surabaya Gubeng.
  - Turangga, to Bandung via Madiun-Solo Balapan-Yogyakarta-Tasikmalaya and to Surabaya Gubeng.
  - Bangunkarta, to Gambir via Madiun-Solo Jebres-Semarang Tawang-Cirebon and to Surabaya Gubeng.
- Mixed class
  - Mutiara Selatan, to Bandung via Madiun-Solo Balapan-Yogyakarta-Tasikmalaya and to Surabaya Gubeng (executive-premium economy).
  - Gaya Baru Malam Selatan, to Pasar Senen via Madiun-Purwosari-Lempuyangan-Purwokerto-Cirebon Prujakan and to Surabaya Gubeng (executive-economy plus).
  - Ranggajati, to Cirebon via Madiun-Solo Balapan-Yogyakarta-Purwokerto and Surabaya Gubeng to continued Jember (business-executive).
  - Wijayakusuma, to Cilacap via Madiun-Solo Balapan-Yogyakarta and Surabaya Gubeng to Ketapang (executive-premium economy).
  - Anjasmoro, from and to Pasar Senen via Madiun-Yogyakarta-Purwokerto-Cirebon (executive-economy plus).
  - Sancaka, to Yogyakarta via Madiun-Solo Balapan and to Surabaya Gubeng (regular: executive-premium economy; facultative: executive-economy plus or premium).
  - Logawa, to Purwokerto via Madiun-Purwosari-Lempuyangan and Surabaya Gubeng to continue Jember (business-economy).
- Premium economy class
  - Jayakarta, to Jakarta Kota via Madiun-Solo Balapan-Yogyakarta-Purwokerto-Cirebon and to Surabaya Gubeng.
- Economy class
  - Pasundan, to Kiaracondong via Madiun-Purwosari-Lempuyangan-Tasikmalaya and to Surabaya Gubeng.
  - Sri Tanjung, to Lempuyangan via Madiun-Purwosari and to Surabaya Gubeng to continue Ketapang.
- Local economy
  - Dhoho, to Kertosono continued Blitar via Kediri and to Surabaya Kota.
  - Ekonomi lokal Kertosono, to Kertosono and to Surabaya Kota.

=== Freight services ===
- Over Night Services, to Surabaya Kota and to Bandung via Madiun-Lempuyangan-Kroya-Tasikmalaya.

== Incidents ==
- On 14 January 1997 at 4.30, three train carriages carrying fuel - possibly in being pulled by locomotive Krupp-M1500BB (BB301 22) - rolled 800 meters west of Jombang Station after hitting an embankment. As a result, BBM (Bahan Bakar Minyak) (consisting of diesel fuel and premium fuel) spilled and flowed into the Bokrantai River, then caught fire. One resident was killed, while the machinist and kernet suffered burns. The journey of a number of trains was hampered by this incident.
- On 27 November 2007, the locomotive and one Bangunkarta train plunged 300 meters west of Jombang Station. There were no fatalities in this incident, but the train journey had to be delayed until evening.
- On 14 August 2010, there was a wessel error so that the GE U20C (CC203 20) locomotive that was pulling the Rapih Dhoho train entered the Badug track and fell into the fields. There were no casualties in this incident.

Preceding station	Kereta Api Indonesia	Following station
Sembung towards Kertosono	Kertosono–Wonokromo	Peterongan towards Wonokromo
