= Petarukan train collision =

2010 train crash in Central Java, Indonesia

Details
- Date: 2 October 2010; 03:00 local time (20:00, 1 October UTC.)
- Location: Petarukan
- Coordinates: 6°51′36″S 109°20′24″E
- Country: Indonesia
- Operator: PT Kereta Api
- Incident type: Rear-end collision
- Cause: Signal passed at danger

Statistics
- Trains: 2 (Senja Utama Semarang and Argo Bromo Anggrek)
- Passengers: 900 (approx)
- Deaths: 36
- Injured: 50

The Petarukan train collision occurred on 2 October 2010, at Petarukan, in Pemalang Regency of Central Java, Indonesia, when two intercity trains collided with each other. Thirty-six people died as a result of the accident, and 50 people were reported injured.

== Accident ==
At 3:00am local time on 2 October 2010, an Argo Bromo Anggrek executive train travelling from Jakarta to Surabaya ran into the rear of a Senja Utama Semarang business train at Petarukan, Pemalang, a city on the north coast of central Java. The Argo Bromo executive train had 336 passengers on board, while the Senja Utama Semarang business train was bound for Semarang and carrying 663 passengers. The Senja Utama Semarang train was waiting for an oncoming train at Petarukan station because of a single track section ahead. The Argo Bromo Anggrek train passed a signal at danger and eventually rear-ended the waiting train. Three carriages derailed and overturned, 36 people were reported killed and 50 injured, with the death toll expected to rise. The accident was the deadliest in Indonesia since the Bintaro train crash on 19 October 1987, which killed 156 people.

At around the same time, a second crash in Surakarta (Solo), also in Central Java, killed a single person when an economy train was grazed in the rear by an express train.

== Reaction ==
A spokesman for Indonesian President Susilo Bambang Yudhoyono said the president had instructed "sanction[s] against whoever was responsible for the accident."

Director General of Railway Affairs at the Ministry of Transportation Tunjung Inderawan offered apologies for the two incidents, saying that "I apologize to the families of all the victims of the train accidents."
