= Jakarta–Surabaya line =

Railway line in Indonesia

Jakarta-Surabaya railway
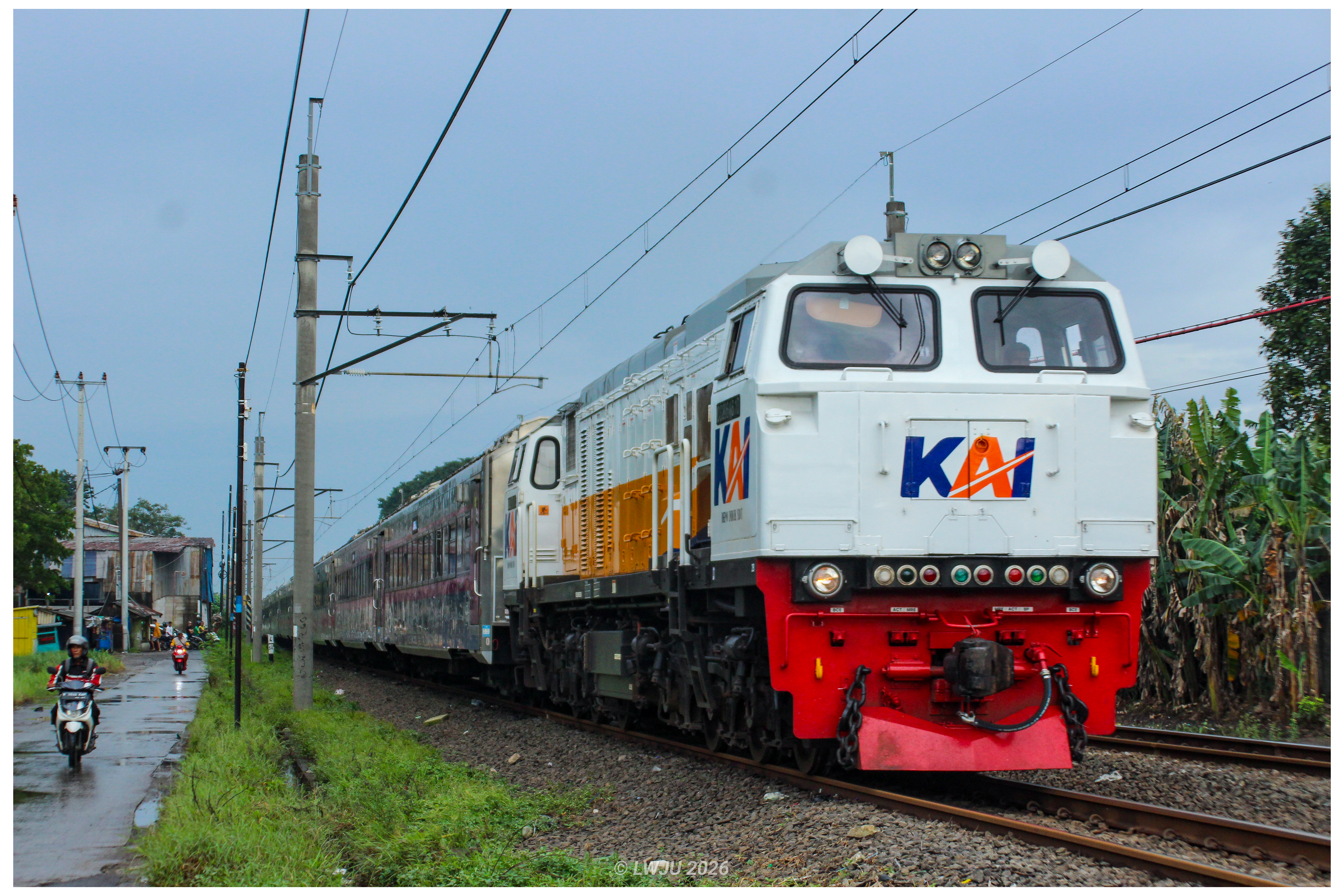
- 1 Argo Bromo Anggrek passing in Tambun, 2026

Overview
- Status: Operational
- Locale: Indonesia
- Termini: Jakarta Kota Station; Surabaya Pasar Turi Station

Service
- Operator(s): PT Kereta Api

Technical
- Number of tracks: Partially double track (double-tracking ongoing)
- Track gauge: 3 ft 6 in (1,067 mm)
- Electrification: Jakarta-Cikarang section

The Jakarta-Surabaya line (the North line; Indonesian: Lintas Utara) is one of two rail lines on the island of Java that connect Jakarta and Surabaya. The line follows the route of the North Coast Road. The executive-class Argo Bromo Anggrek express train provides a limited-stop service on the line.

In September 2019, Indonesia signed a project agreement with Japan for the medium-speed train project to link Jakarta and Surabaya. The project, which will incorporate some existing tracks, is expected to double the current speed of the existing train to 160kph. It will slash travel time between the two cities from nine hours to five and a half hours. It is estimated that the project will cost IDR60tn (US$4.3bn), which will be funded by Japanese loans. However, the project was cancelled in July 2023 due to the lack of progress. In September 2023, Indonesian and Chinese authorities discussed further plans to extend the Jakarta-Bandung high speed railway across the Java island. It is estimated that travel time between Jakarta and Surabaya will be shortened to 3.5 hours.

== See also ==
- Argo Bromo Anggrek
- Sembrani
- Jakarta–Manggarai line
- PT Kereta Api
