= Sembrani =

Passenger train service in Indonesia

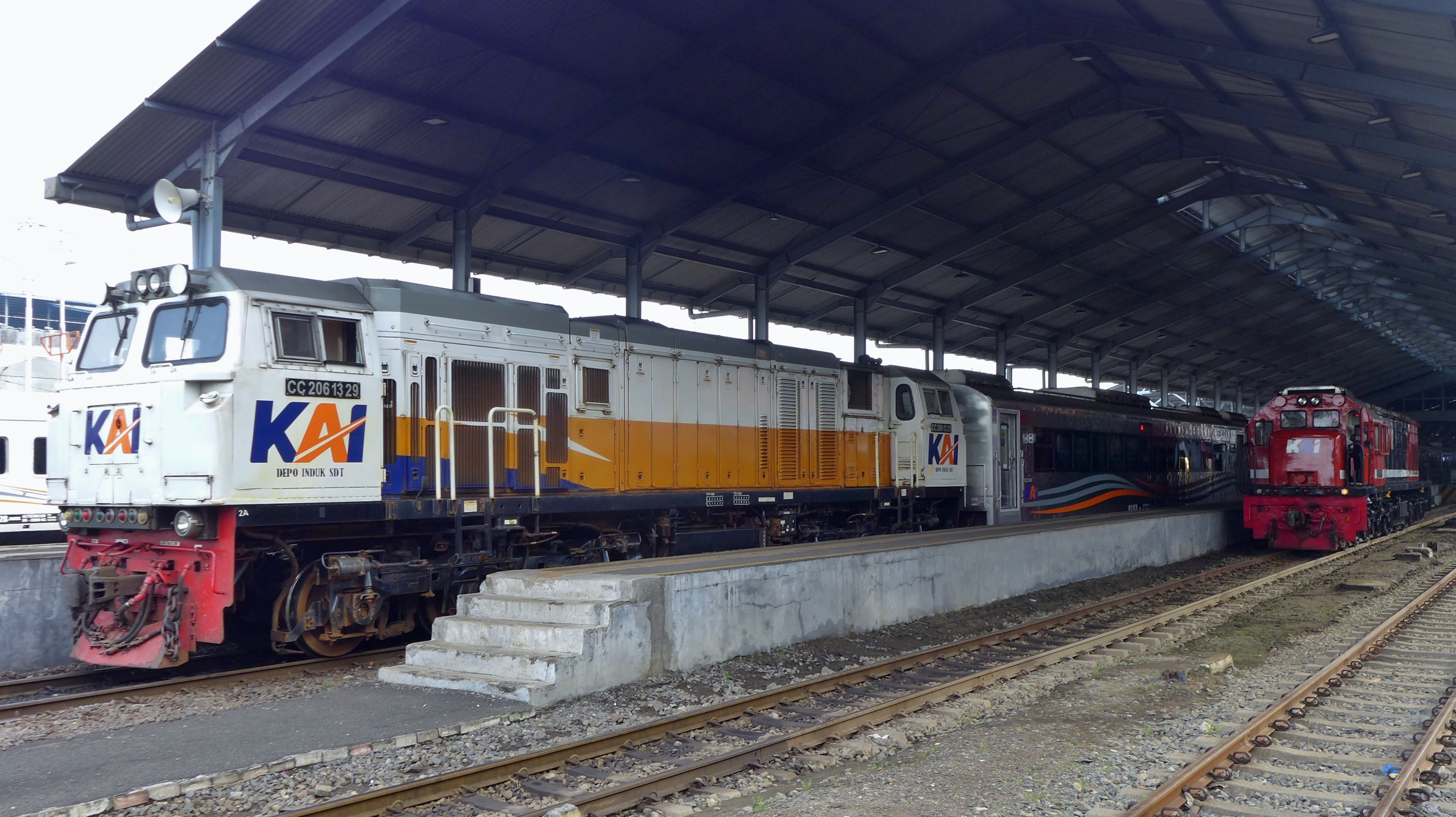
- Sembrani train was stand by at Surabaya Pasar Turi station, February 2025

Overview
- Service type: Inter-city rail
- Status: Operational (regular and addition)
- Locale: Operational VIII Surabaya
- Predecessor: Mutiara Utara train (North Pearl train) (1980s - 1995)
- First service: 1 October 1995
- Current operator: Kereta Api Indonesia

Route
- Termini: Surabaya Pasarturi; Gambir
- Distance travelled: 720 km (447 mil)
- Average journey time: 8 hours 28 minutes
- Service frequency: 2x daily each way
- Train numbers: 39-42 (regular); 7003-7004 (addition)

On-board services
- Classes: executive and luxury
- Seating arrangements: 50 seats arranged 2–2 (executive); 26 seats arranged 1–2 (luxury); 18 seats arranged 1–1 (luxury)
- Sleeping arrangements: Seats swivel and recline up to 140° (luxury for 39 and 42); Seats don't swivel but recline up to 170° (luxury for 40 and 41)
- Catering facilities: On-board cafe and trolley service

Technical
- Rolling stock: CC206
- Track gauge: 1.067 mm
- Operating speed: 105-120 km/h (65-75 mph)
Route map

Sembrani is a mixed passenger train offering executive and luxury class train service, operated by PT Kereta Api Indonesia. It runs between Surabaya Pasarturi and Gambir. The train offers a morning and a night service, travelling around 720 kilometres (450 miles) in 8 hours 28 minutes.

The Sembrani train was launched on 1 October 1995, a month after the launch of the Turangga train from Bandung to Surabaya Gubeng on 1 September 1995. Unlike the Argo Bromo Anggrek that only stops at two stations (Cirebon and Semarang Tawang), the Sembrani train stops at nine stations including Jatinegara, Surabaya Pasar Turi and Gambir.

== Mythology ==
Unlike the Turangga train (Bandung-Surabaya Gubeng) that takes its name from the horse (land), the Sembrani train is named after the winged horse in Javanese culture, a mythological Hindu creature depicted as capable of flight. This horse was also ridden by the god Vishnu.

The Sembrani train, which operates between Surabaya Pasar Turi and Gambir, began operating on 1 October 1995.

== History ==
=== Mutiara Utara train (North Pearl train) ===
Mutiara (Pearl) was a passenger train service owned by the National Railway Corporation (PNKA) that once served the Surabaya–Jakarta route via Semarang Tawarang. The train was officially launched 26 September 1971. Initially, it featured a Class I train service, featuring only the first-class sitting carriages and a dining car, later added with a power car. In an advertisement published in Berita Buana (Buana News) on 25 September 1971, PNKA offered air conditioning and audio entertainment, reclining seats, and breakfast, dinner, and snacks.

Later, the name of this train was changed to "Mutiara Utara" (in English, "North Pearl") due to the emergence of the Mutiara Selatan train. In the mid-1980s, Mutiara Utara's rake changed to mixed clas, carrying both first and second class passengers. On 9 June 1990, the then Railways Service Corporation LLC (PJKA) inaugurated the first true executive class passenger coaches (at that time a class above the existing first class AC), with the first going to the Bima and Mutiara Utara. Anwar Suprijadi, who was then the Operational Director of PJKA LLC, targeted a revenue of Rp6 billion from executive class ticket sales.

On 11 March 1992, Perumka changed the format of the executive train classes, to Executive-A and Executive-B, which was later simplified to simply a singular "Executive" class. Mutiara Utara was briefly removed when Perumka launched the Suryajaya in 1994. However, that train was later reinstated by Perumka LLC due to public outcry and huge demand. The Mutiara Utara service didn't last long, ending in October 1995 and was replaced by the Sembrani with the Satwa (animal) Executive class.

=== Sembrani train ===
The Sembrani train made its official first public trip on 16 October 1995, by the Railways Public Corporation LLC (Perumka) as an upgrade and development of the previously operating Mutiara Utara. At the beginning of its operation, the Head of the Commercial Section of Perumka Operational Area VIII Surabaya targeted a daily passenger capacity of 4,000.

In the 2000s, this train had a bad reputation among the riding public due to the uncomfortable passenger seats on some coaches manufactured in the 1950s and 1960s as part of its rake. To improve this train's image, one train set underwent a refurbishment at the Manggarai Railway Center, which began operating in 2010 under the name "Sembrani New Image." As of 2016, the Sembrani train operated using a series of executive coaches made by PT INKA, manufactured for KAI Ltd in 2016.

As of mid-November 2019 before the implementation of the train travel chart (Gapeka 2019) effect on 1 December 2019, the Sembrani train (along with the Gumarang train) was taken over operational ownership to Operational Area VIII Surabaya from Operational Area I Jakarta along with the train set was transferred to the Surabaya Pasarturi Train Depot (SBI), which was caused by 2 new trains that would arrive at Gapeka 2019, namely Dharmawangsa train (PSE-SBI) and Anjasmoro train (PSE-JG) as well as the extension of three train services from Operation Area II Bandung namely Argo Wilis (GMR-BD-SGU), Mutiara Selatan (South Pearl) train (GMR-BD-ML) and Malabar (ML-BD-PSE) as of 1 December 2019. Since 1 December 2019, Sembrani train have added a 26-seat Luxury class train service which was previously used by Taksaka.

Sembrani train began serving passengers at Ngrombo beginning on 20 January 2020. On 28 September 2022, The speed of the Sembrani train (except for the Additional Sembrani) was upgraded to 120 km/hour (75 mph) from the original 105–110 km/h (65-68 mph). Sembrani trains added stops at Cikarang Station starting 1 February 2022, and during the 2023 Eid al-Fitr holiday period, the speed was also increased to 120 km/h (75 mph).

On 1 June 2023, following the enactment of new train travel chart 2023, the Sembrani train added a morning service with train numbers 61–62, the successor to the "Sembrani Additional Train" that departs on a morning schedule from Surabaya Pasarturi and Gambir. This train was a "trial run" of morning passenger train service during the Eid al-Fitr 1444 H homecoming and return journeys. In connection with the change of the Argo Bromo Anggrek train series to a new generation executive, starting 29 March 2024, the Sembrani train will began using legacy coaches from the first generation stainless steel train sets manufactured by INKA Limited.

On 1 June 2025, the Sembrani train (for 40 and 41) added a Luxury Sleeper class coach (a legacy of the Argo Bromo Anggrek) which will also replace the Luxury class Generation 2 coach as the Impact of the Argo Bromo Anggrek's adoption of the compartment suite coach in 2024. This version of the Sembrani therefore is now considered a de facto night train, the first non-Argo Class type overnight and sleeper train service in the KAI network after 30 years.

== List of stations ==
On 1 February 2025 following of the enactment of new train travel chart 2025, the Sembrani train will depart each way after the Argo Bromo Anggrek that use the new generation stainless steel for morning and night schedule.

- Surabaya Pasarturi (Start/End)
- Lamongan (night schedule only)
- Bojonegoro
- Cepu
- Ngrombo (no stopped as schedule)
- Semarang Tawang
- Pekalongan
- Tegal
- Cirebon
- Bekasi
- Jatinegara (only bound from Surabaya)
- Gambir (Start/End)

== Accidents and incidents ==
- On 14 April 2006 at 02.10 local time, The Sembrani train bound for Surabaya Pasarturi collided with the Kertajaya train bound for the same destination at Gubug Station. This incident began when the Sembrani train was about to overtake the Kertajaya train which entered track 1 after the Gumarang train had overtaken it. The Kertajaya train then proceeded towards track 2, while the Kertajaya train had not yet been permitted to proceed. At that time, the Sembrani train was passing directly on track 2 at high speed, resulting in an unavoidable accident. This incident resulted in the killing of 14 people.
- On 14 June 2025, 3 children were hit by the Sembrani train at a Level crossing in Demak, Central Java. 1 of the 3 children was killed.
- On 16 August 2025, at 08.00 local time (before Independence of Indonesia), the Sembrani collided with a motorcycle rider in Surabaya, causing train travel delays.

== See also ==
- Argo Bromo Anggrek
- Harina
- Argo Wilis
- Taksaka
- Lodaya
- Turangga
- Gumarang
- Sancaka
