= Anggrek (train) =

Luxury executive class train in Indonesia

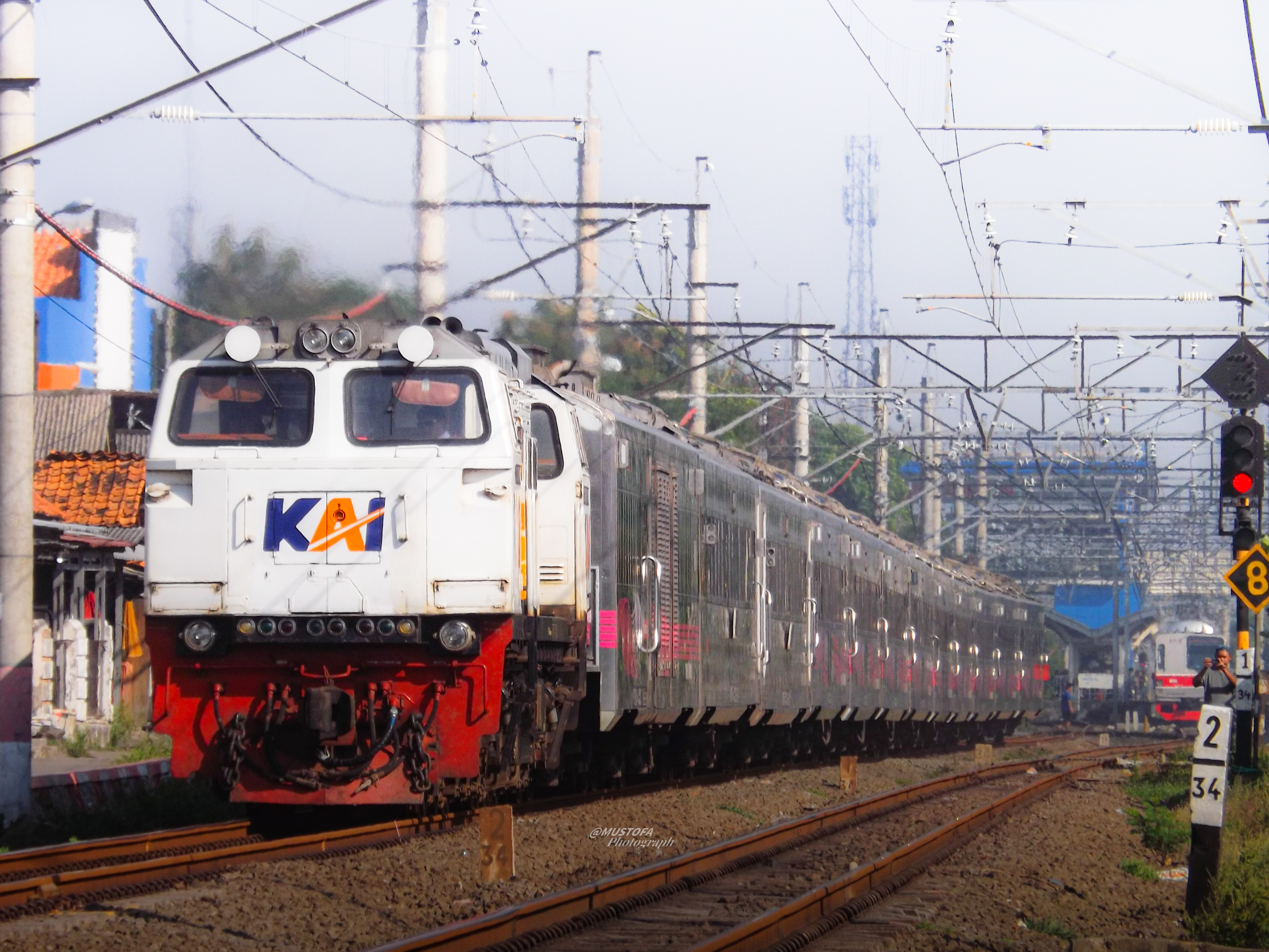
- Argo Bromo Anggrek with the New Generation executive train speeding to Surabaya Pasar Turi station (2024)

Overview
- Service type: Inter-city rail
- Status: Operational
- Locale: The 8th Operational Area of Surabaya
- Predecessor: Suryajaya (1994-1995); Argo Bromo (1995-2000); Argo Bromo Anggrek (1997-2026)
- First service: 24 September 1997; 29 years ago (as the Argo Bromo Anggrek); 9 May 2026; 6 months ago (as the Anggrek)
- Current operator: Kereta Api Indonesia

Route
- Termini: Surabaya Pasar Turi; Gambir
- Stops: Semarang Tawang, Cirebon
- Distance travelled: 720 kilometres (447 mi)
- Average journey time: 7 hours and 45 minutes
- Service frequency: Twice daily
- Train number: 1-4

Technical
- Rolling stock: CC206
- Operating speed: 90–120 km/h (55–75 mph)

Anggrek, formerly known as Argo Bromo Anggrek, is the name of Executive and Compartment Suite train jointly operated by Kereta Api Indonesia between Surabaya and Jakarta in Indonesia. The train covers 720 kilometres (447 mi) in 7 hours and 45 minutes along Java's north coast, stopping at Semarang Tawang and Cirebon. It is one of the best known trains in Indonesia.

== Etymology ==
The name Argo Bromo was derived from the volcano Bromo in East Java. The term anggrek (Indonesian: orchid) - the current name of the train - was added to differentiate the train from its predecessor service in 1997. The orchid was for years represented in the purple-white livery of the train.

== Service ==
In December 1994, KAI Ltd launched the Suryajaya, a executive class intercity long distance service running the Jakarta-Surabaya route in 10 hours, using newly refurbished executive class passenger coaches (ex-East German imports produced for KAI in the 1960s), a dining car, baggage generator car, and a CC201 diesel locomotive.

The immediate predecessor of this train, the JS950 Argo Bromo, made the Jakarta–Surabaya run in a record nine hours (one less than the Suryajaya) and was inaugurated with its first official trip in Gambir Station on 31 July 1995 by the second President of Indonesia, Suharto, ahead of both the 50th Indonesian Independence Day Golden Jubilee celebrations in 17 August (hence the JS950, for "Jakarta–Surabaya in nine hours, launched to commemorate the 50th anniversary of Indonesia's independence") - and the golden jubilee of Kereta Api Indonesia that September. The success of the service led to the introduction of Argo Bromo Anggrek service which commenced with its first timetable appearance on 24 September 1997 in time for KAI's 52nd corporate anniversary and as part of celebrations for the 130th anniversary of the KAI network.

The difference between Argo Bromo Anggrek and the original JS950 Argobromo intercity train service, which would be fused into the former in the 2000s, is the usage of a set of more sophisticated passenger coaches with bolsterless bogies, which are made locally by Indonesian Railway Industry Ltd (INKA) - no less than future president B. J. Habibie was responsible for the concept and partially the design for these passenger coaches, the first all-Indonesian produced modern long distance executive class coaches for intercity services after years of licensed productions by INKA from overseas designs. Although initially hailed as technological innovation of its day, even nicknamed as "747 on rail" by Tourism Minister Joop Ave, they were later downgraded in later years by having the disc brakes replaced with conventional brake shoes, and automatic doors replaced by manual ones due to poor maintenance, especially during and after the 1997 Asian financial crisis and a derailment at Manggarai station in 2010.

In 2021 schedule, From Gambir station (Jakarta), this train departs at 08.00 and 20.30, and arrives at Pasar Turi station (Surabaya) at 16.42 and 05.12. From Pasar Turi, this train departs at 09.00 and 20.35, arrives at Gambir at 17.44 and 05.19.

Currently Anggrek train consists are composed of eight executive class and one Luxury class passenger coaches, together with a compartment suite sleeping car, a dining car and baggage-generator car, all pulled by GE CM20EMP (previously GE U20C) locomotives. At the time of its first inauguration, the train used a set of special coaches with "K9" bolsterless bogies. Since December 2010, coaches from the Sembrani and other standard executive class trains (K1) substitute the K9 coaches, which in that stage underwent refurbishment and renovation at INKA factories located in Madiun, East Java. Since 2019, Argo Bromo Anggrek uses stainless-steel coaches produced by INKA which has a standardized design as other executive class coaches built in the same period in Indonesia. Since 29 March 2024, Argo Bromo Anggrek has officially used the "New Generation" executive trainsets whose overall construction have a 2023/2024 stainless steel body made by PT INKA.

Starting February 1, 2025, Argo Bromo Anggrek train no longer stops on Bojonegoro and Pekalongan Stations, so that the train can shorten its distance time to 7 hours 45 minutes.

On June 1, 2025, Argo Bromo Anggrek officially added the Compartment Suite sleeper/compartment car, also made by INKA, to its consist, which is also the same used on three intercity long distance services, the Bima and Argo Semeru, and the new Sangkuriang, becoming the 3rd Argo class train to receive this coach for the overnight runs from Jakarta to Surabaya.

On May 5, 2026, KAI Ltd announced that the train service will be renamed the Anggrek beginning May 9, in a decision that sparked outrage and shock amongst the rail enthusiast community and the riding public, given that the historic Argo Bromo branding was to be officially retired by the company after 31 years with effect from May 8. It would remain an Argo-classed service, however, given its long history and prestige as KAI's flagship northern Java intercity service.

== Facilities ==
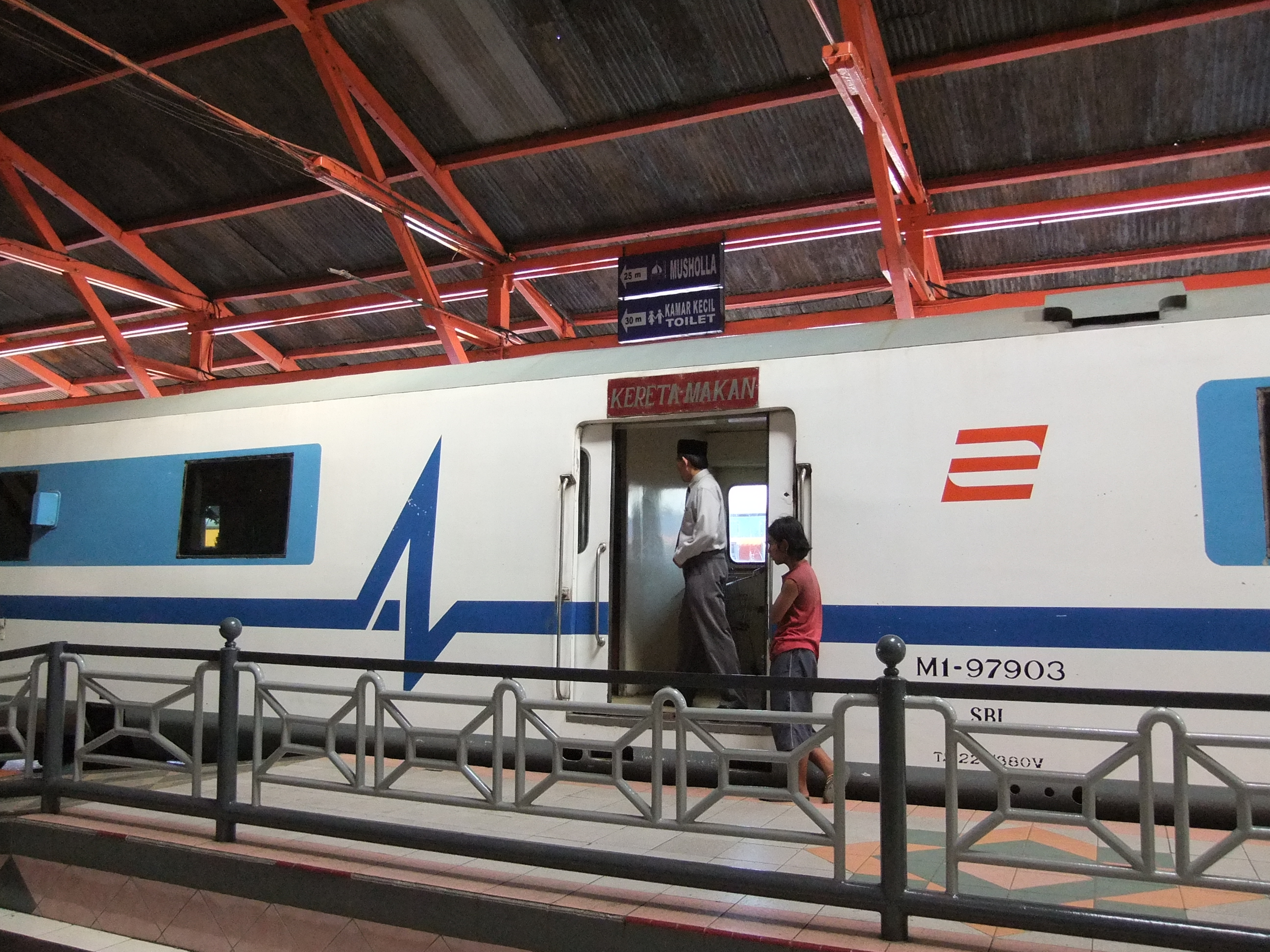
Argo Bromo Anggrek dining car (old version)

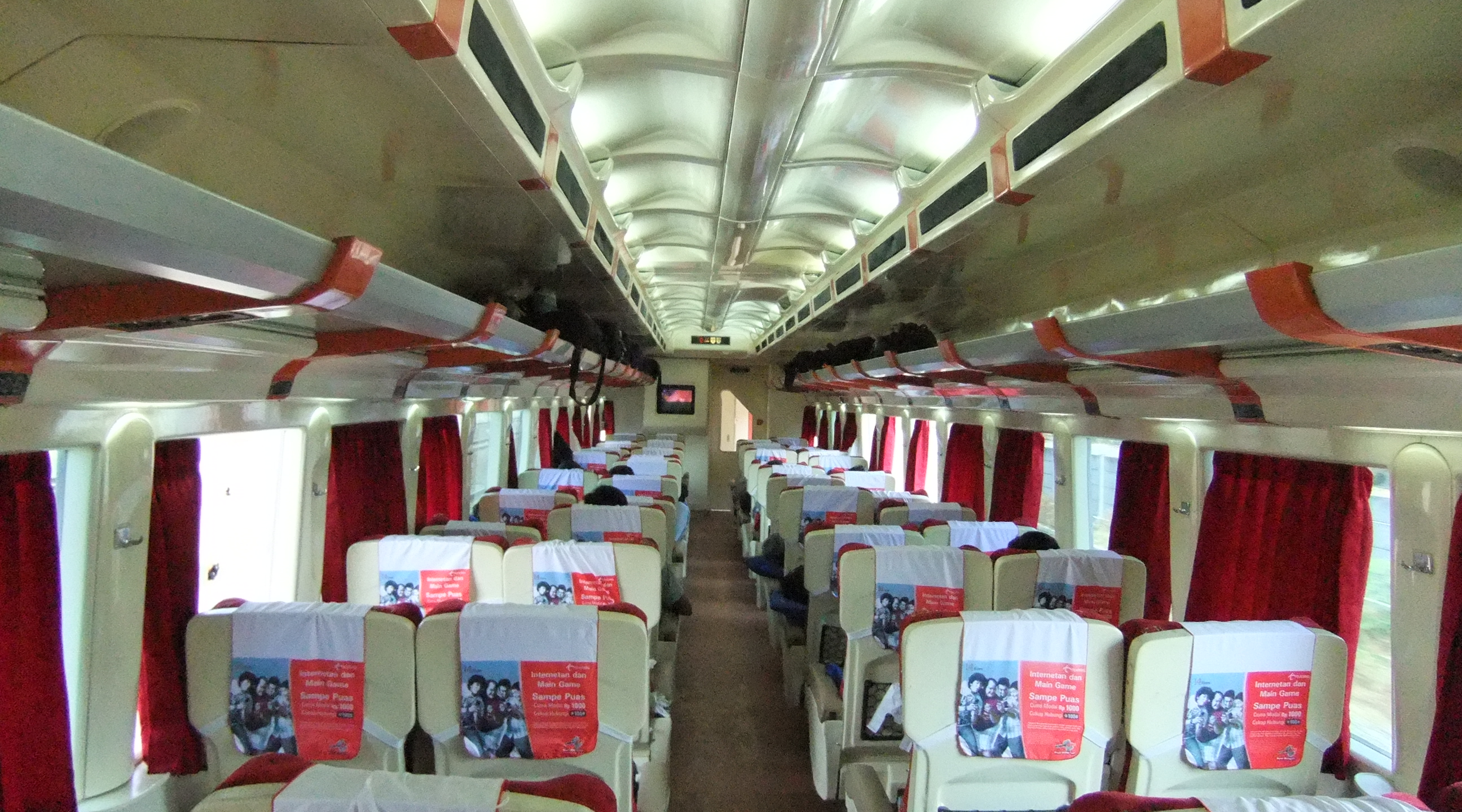
Interior of Argo Bromo Anggrek (old version)

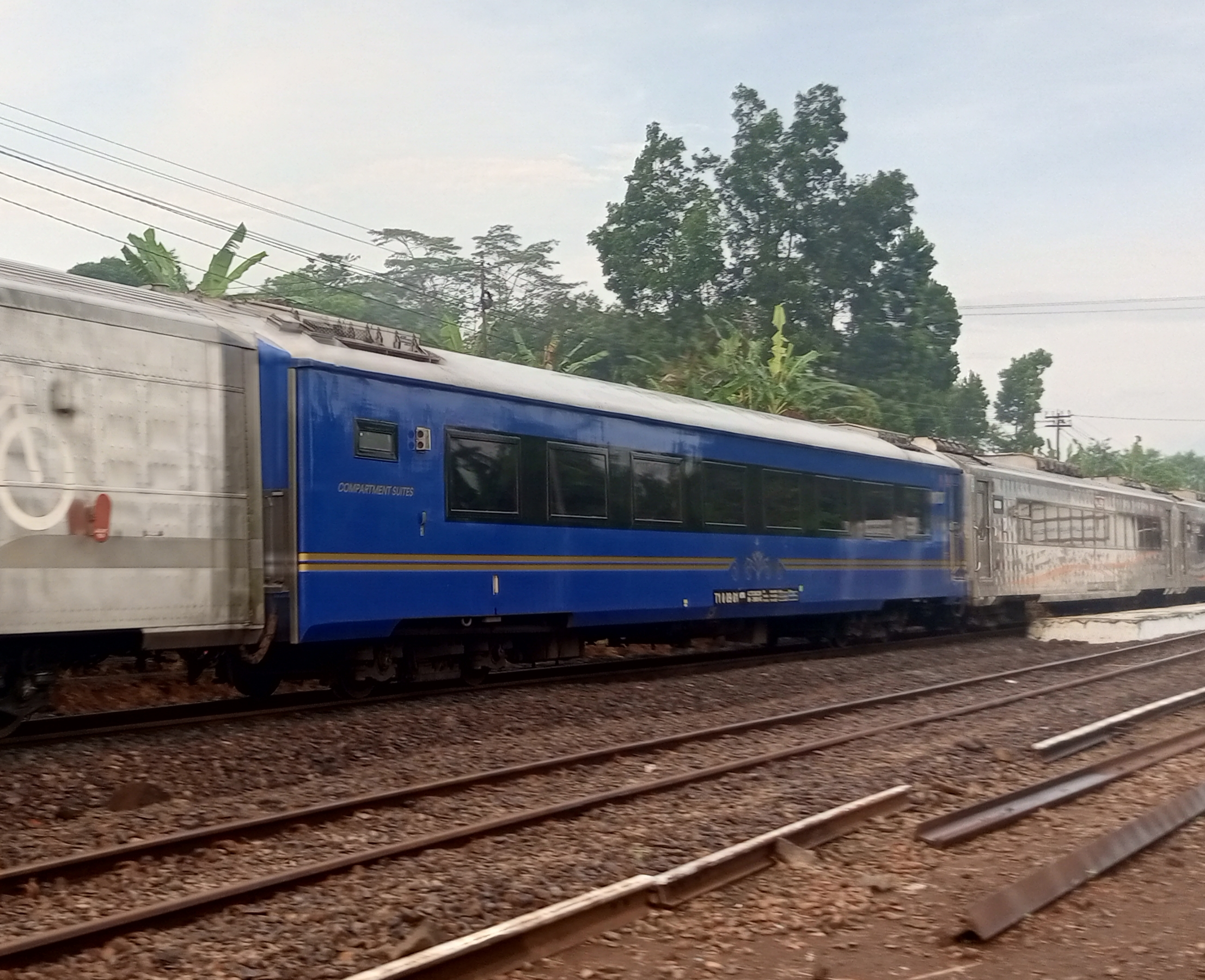
Compartment suite with T1 0 09 XX used by the Anggrek and Sangkuriang intercity trains

The Anggrek provides entertainment facilities during the long day or night journey in the form of audio-video (Show On Rail) either thru TVs on the passenger coaches or thru individual extra android-ready facilities in the Compartment Suite car. Passengers can also order food and drinks, which can be consumed in either the passenger coaches, the compartment suite car, or in a dedicated dining car equipped with karaoke facilities. All of this is deliberately designed to give the atmosphere of a tourist hotel on rails.

For overnight passengers, individual sleeping facilities are offered on the Compartment Suite sleeper car, which also provides private facilities for day travellers seeking privacy and comfort.

Free Wi-Fi is available on all coaches regardless of class as well as a passenger information system.

== Timetable ==
Anggrek train route map, accurate since 1 February 2025 (based on 2025 train travel graphics in Java)

Anggrek train schedule as of 1 February 2025, times are in GMT+7:

Anggrek Train Day Service
KA 1 (Surabaya Pasarturi-Gambir)			KA 2 (Gambir-Surabaya Pasarturi)		
Station	Arrive	Depart	Station	Arrive	Depart
Surabaya Pasarturi	——	09.10	Gambir	——	08.20
Semarang Tawang Bank Jateng	12.02	12.05	Cirebon	10.43	10.46
Cirebon	14.24	14.27	Semarang Tawang Bank Jateng	13.05	13.08
Gambir	16.55	——	Surabaya Pasarturi	16.05	——

Anggrek Train Overnight
KA 3 (Surabaya Pasarturi-Gambir)			KA 4 (Gambir-Surabaya Pasarturi)		
Station	Arrive	Departed	Station	Arrive	Departed
Surabaya Pasarturi	——	21.15	Gambir	——	20.30
Semarang Tawang Bank Jateng	00.07	00.10	Cirebon	22.53	22.56
Cirebon	02.29	02.32	Semarang Tawang Bank Jateng	01.15	01.18
Gambir	05.00	——	Surabaya Pasarturi	04.15	——

== Incidents ==
- 2005: a dining car caught fire.
- 2009: a power car caught fire at Cikampek. The train continued on to Cirebon without the power car.
- 2 October 2010: at 3:00 am, the Argo Bromo Anggrek collided with the Fajar Utama Semarang near Petarukan station. Thirty-three people were killed and 26 injured, and coaches six and nine destroyed.
- 16 December 2010: four students were hit in Dengok, Padangan, Bojonegoro, East Java. Three were killed.
- 16 November 2012: the train derailed near Bulakamba station.
- 9 March 2015: the train, pulled by locomotive 13 68, collided with a truck in Weleri, Kendal, Central Java. The driver died after the accident.
- 30 April 2021: the train hit 2 people at an unguarded illegal crossing in Penaburan Village, Weleri
- 1 August 2025: the train derailed at the Pegaden Baru railway station yard, Subang Regency, West Java. There were no fatalities from this incident, but 1 person suffered minor injuries.
- 27 April 2026: At 8:52 pm, the Argo Bromo Anggrek collided with Cikarang Loop Line KRL Commuterline number PLB 5568A at Bekasi Timur station. Currently 88 injuries are reported, at least 16 of them are fatal.
- 1 May 2026: the train hit a minibus that carried Hajj pilgrims in Pulokulon Village, Grobogan Regency, Central Java, killing four people and wounding five others.

== See also ==
- Jakarta–Surabaya line
- List of named passenger trains of Indonesia
- Rail transport in Indonesia
- Argo Semeru, same destination but different start and route
- Bima (train), same destination but different start and route
- Sembrani, same destination and route (Pasarturi Station–Gambir Station), but different executive class (satwa class)
- Argo Wilis
- Turangga
