= Bima (train) =

Passenger train service between Jakarta and Surabaya (via Yogyakarta), Indonesia

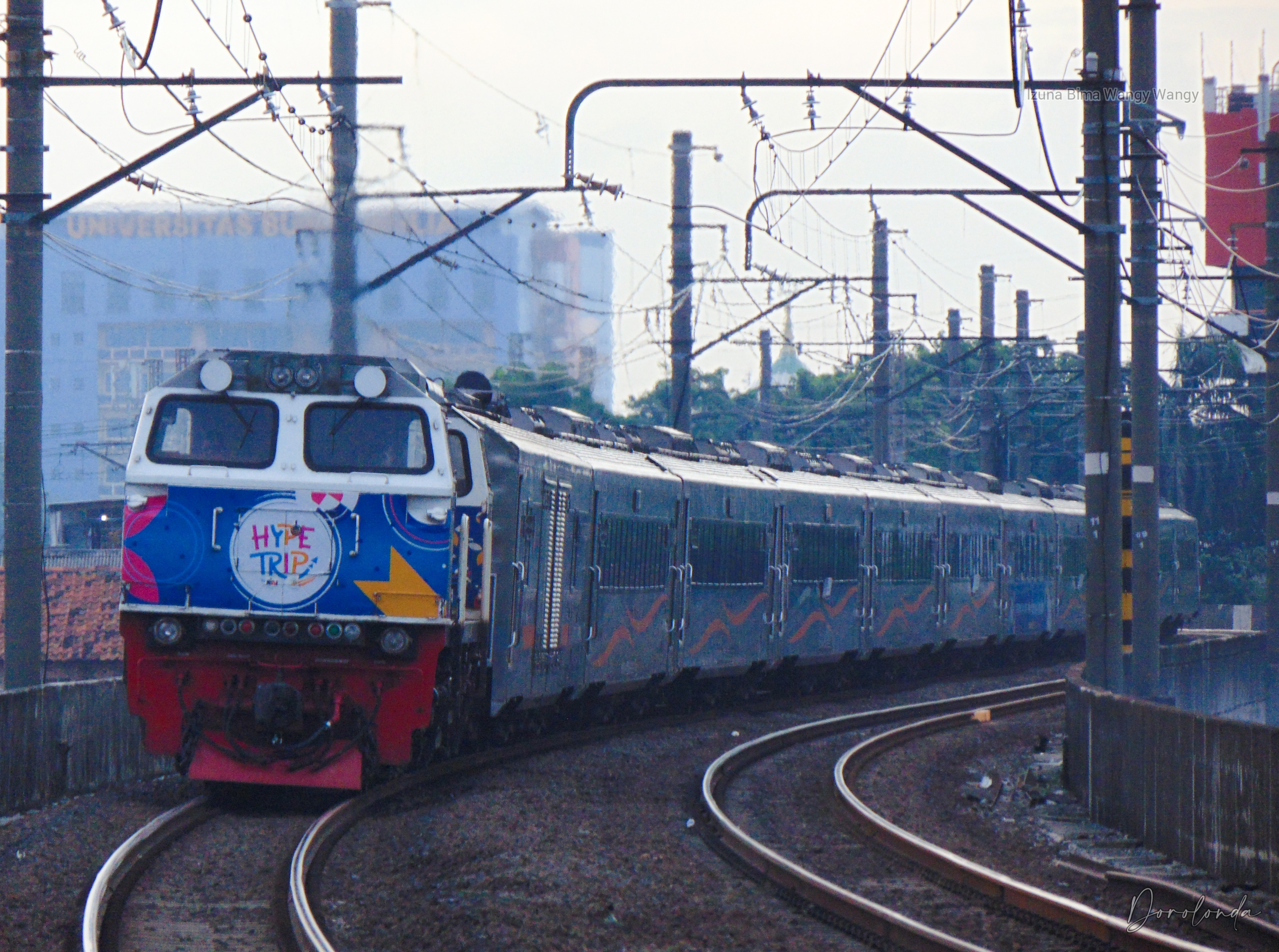

Overview
- Service type: Inter-city rail
- Status: Operational
- First service: 1 June 1967
- Current operator: Kereta Api Indonesia
- Ridership: 800-1000 daily

Route
- Termini: Gambir; Surabaya Gubeng
- Stops: 16
- Distance travelled: 820 km (510 mi)
- Average journey time: 10 hours 22 minutes
- Service frequency: Daily each way
- Train numbers: 7 (Surabaya Gubeng to Gambir); 8 (Gambir to Surabaya Gubeng)

On-board services
- Class: Executive with compartment suite
- Seating arrangements: Recline-able and rotatable seating in 2-2 configuration
- Catering facilities: On-board cafe and trolley service

Technical
- Rolling stock: CC206
- Track gauge: 1,067 mm (3 ft 6 in)
- Operating speed: 80 km/h (50 mph) to 120 km/h (75 mph)
- Track owners: DJKA and Ministry of Transportation
Route map

The Bima train (Indonesian: Kereta Api Bima) is an executive class train service with compartment suite that is operated by PT Kereta Api Indonesia (Persero) on the island of Java. The service runs between Gambir Station (GMR) in Jakarta at the west end of the island and Surabaya Gubeng Station (SGU) in Surabaya in the east. The train covers 820 kilometres (510 mi) in 10 hours 22 minutes. Bima was initially an acronym for "Biru Malam" (lit. Night Blue).

Uniquely, this train does not use the Jakarta–Surabaya railway line or North Line along the northern coast of Java, but rather a route that takes it along the southern coast of the island.

Although the Satwa class, KA Bima is an Argo class Executive train and uses the Argo train, in this case is the ex-Argo Bromo train. This train is the first AC executive train and the oldest train that still operates in Indonesia.

== History ==
The service was commenced on 1 June 1967, succeeding Bintang Fadjar (Dawn Star) and Bintang Sendja (Twilight Star) trains launched in 1961 which had stops at Semarang Tawang station. A few weeks later, Bima train was rerouted via Purwokerto and Yogyakarta, and its fleet renewed with the arrival East German-made blue sleeper, dining and baggage-generator cars manufactured for KAI Ltd by Waggonbau Görlitz. This was the first all-AC executive class trainset in KAI's inventory when the class was adopted in 1984.

In 1984, PJKA (now KAI) withdrew the majority of sleeper cars and replaced it with executive-class AC passenger coaches made by Astra Arad in Romania. The sleeper coaches of the Bima train was removed because of the frequent report of alleged gambling or inappropriate things done inside the lockable compartement. The Romanian-built cars were disliked due to their uncomfortable non-reclining seats, earning them a reputation as PJKA's worst executive train service.

On 6 February 2014, the route was extended to Malang station, but on 1 September 2020, Bima was returned to Surabaya, due to the COVID-19 pandemic that caused passenger decrease in the Surabaya - Malang area.

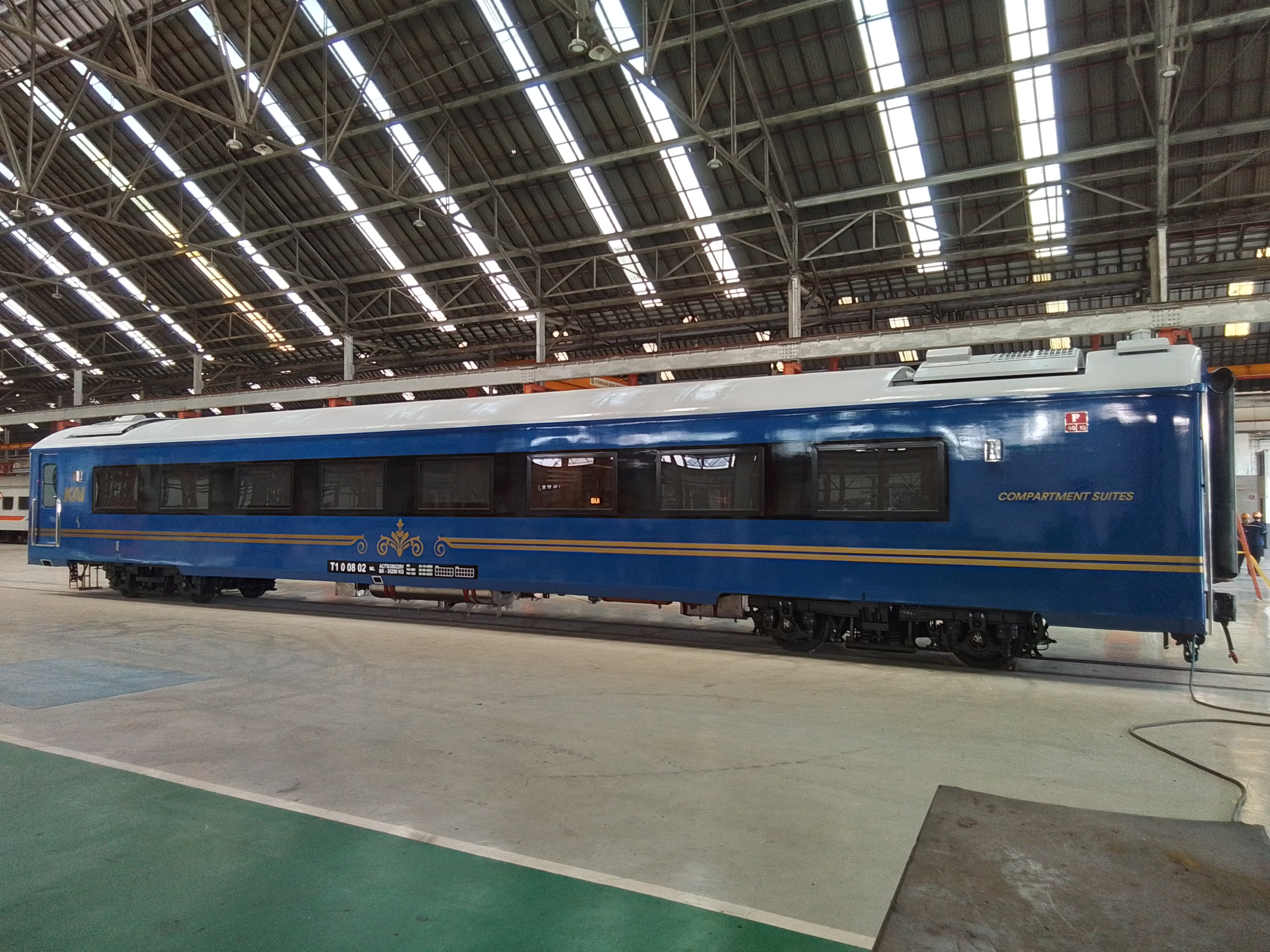
Compartment suite that owned by Bima and Argo Semeru trains

On 10 October 2023, sleeper carriages on Bima train were added again and reinaugurated as Compartement Suite coaches, which are also available on the day Argo Semeru and the Argo Bromo Anggrek.

== Facilities ==
The Bima train consists of executive class and sleeper (compartment suites class) carriages. Executive-class carriages have 50 reclinable and rotatable seats in a 2+2 configuration. Meanwhile, sleeper carriages consist of 16 reclinable sleeping seats (up to 180°) with massager in individual private rooms. The carriage has a luxurious design with entertainment systems, smart toilets, and automatic doors.

== List of stations ==
Legend:

★	Terminus station
●	All trains stop
○	Only night trains stop
▲	Only westbound trains (towards Gambir) stop

Station		Transfer/Notes	City/Regency	Province
★	Gambir	Terminal station. Gambir Gambir 2	Central Jakarta	Jakarta
▲	Jatinegara	Towards Gambir only. Cikarang Loop Line Bali Mester Stasiun Jatinegara Flyover Jatinegara	East Jakarta	Jakarta
●	Cirebon		Cirebon	West Java
●	Purwokerto	Pasar Pon terminal	Purwokerto	Central Java
●	Kroya		Cilacap Regency	Central Java
●	Kebumen		Kebumen Regency	Central Java
●	Kutoarjo	Prambanan Express	Purworejo Regency	Central Java
●	Yogyakarta	Yogyakarta Line Prambanan Express YIA Airport rail link Trans Jogja: 1A, 1B, 2A, 3A, 3B, 13, 15	Yogyakarta	Special Region of Yogyakarta
●	Solo Balapan	Yogyakarta Line Adisumarmo Airport Rail Link Batik Solo Trans: 2, 6, 7F Trans Jateng: 1 Tirtonadi terminal	Surakarta	Central Java
●	Madiun		Madiun	East Java
●	Nganjuk	Dhoho Commuter Line	Nganjuk Regency	East Java
●	Kertosono	Dhoho Commuter Line	Nganjuk Regency	East Java
●	Jombang	Dhoho Commuter Line	Jombang Regency	East Java
●	Mojokerto railway station	Dhoho and Jenggala commuter lines	Mojokerto	East Java
★	Surabaya Gubeng	Terminal station. Surabaya commuter rail system Trans Semanggi Suroboyo: K2L	Surabaya	East Java

== Incidents ==
- On 12 May 1980, eastbound Bima 2 train which had just departed from Purwokerto Station collided with Arimbi bus at level crossing 363, Pasirmuncang, Purwokerto, Central Java. 21 passenger of the bus was killed. 14 were killed by impact, while 7 other died after evacuation. The bus was destroyed and the locomotive of Bima 2 derailed.
- On 2 October 2010, eastbound Bima executive train crashed into the rear of Gaya Baru Malam Selatan economy train in Purwosari Station, Surakarta. 1 died and 4 injured.
- On 8 September 2015 at 05:20, Bima train collied with a pick-up truck in Pulo Gadung, East Jakarta, Jakarta. The collision disrupt KRL Commuterline and other inter-city train schedules.
- On 10 November 2015, a woman and her child were killed by a Bima train on a level-crossing in Kramatjegu Taman, Sidoarjo.

== See also ==
- Rail transport in Indonesia
- List of named passenger trains of Indonesia
- Argo Semeru, same destination and route, but different schedule
