= Compartment suite =

Indonesian sleeper passenger train

Compartment Suite
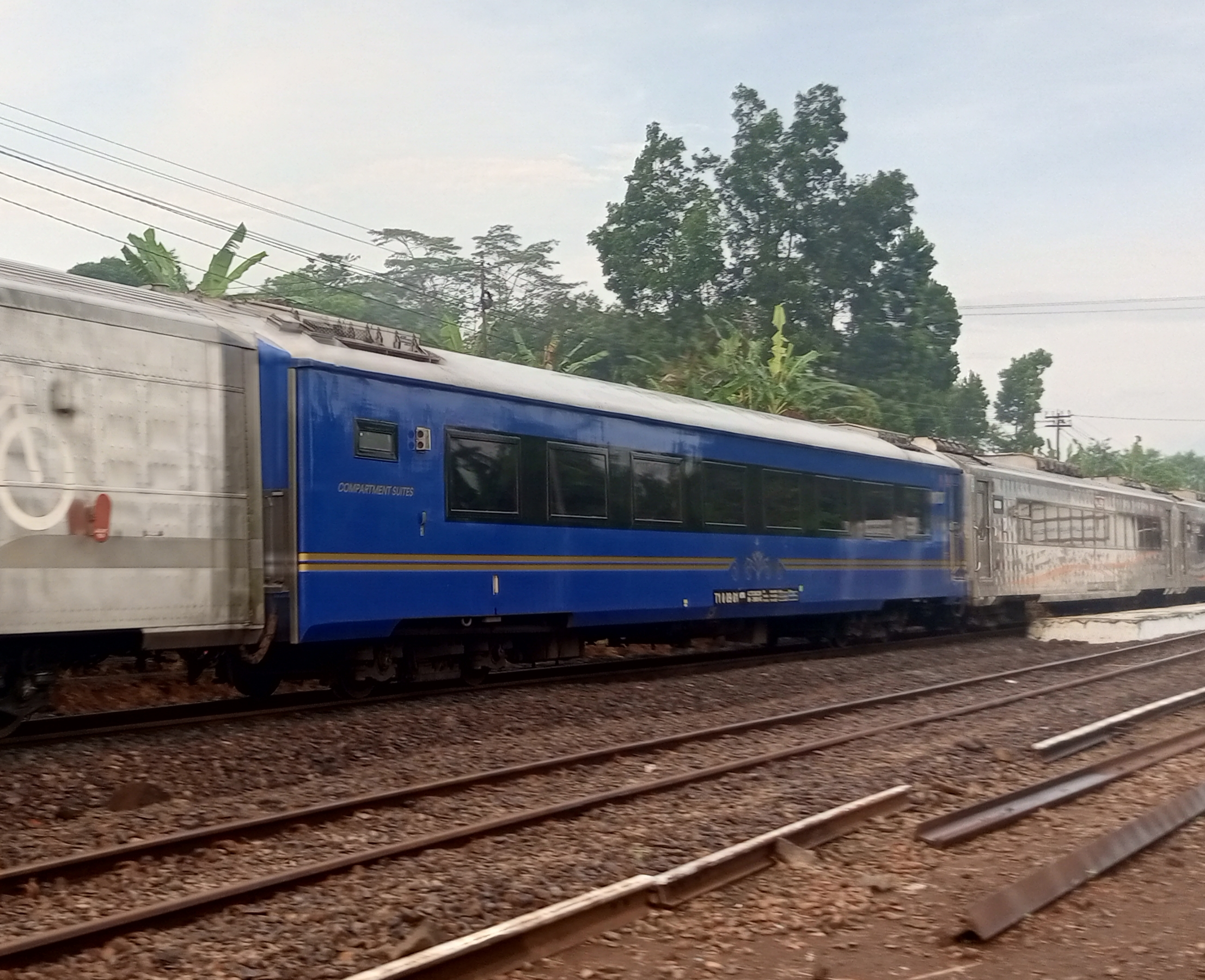
- Compartment Suite T1 0 09 XX (batch 2) use by the Sangkuriang when passed in Warungbandrek, 2026
- Stock type: Passenger railroad car; corridor coach
- In service: 28 September 2023 - present
- Manufacturers: PT Kereta Api Indonesia (assembled using 2008 and 2009 executive trains produced by PT INKA)
- Assembly: Manggarai railway workshop
- Family name: Suite Class
- Constructed: 2023 (batch 1); 2025 (batch 2)
- Entered service: 10 October 2023 (batch 1; Bima and Argo Semeru (Gambir–Surabaya Gubeng)); 1 June 2025 (batch 2; Argo Bromo Anggrek (Gambir–Surabaya Pasarturi)); 1 May 2026 (batch 2; Sangkuriang (Bandung–Ketapang))
- Fleet numbers: T1 0 08 XX (batch 1); T1 0 09 XX (batch 2)
- Owner: Kereta Api Indonesia
- Depots: Jakarta Kota (JAKK) (batch 1); Surabaya Pasarturi (SBI) (batch 2); Ketapang (Banyuwangi) (KTG) (batch 2)

Specifications
- Car body construction: Light steel
- Car length: 20,920 mm (22 yd 2 ft 8 in)
- Width: 2,990 mm (3 yd 0 ft 10 in)
- Height: 3,810 mm (4 yd 0 ft 6 in)
- Floor height: 1,000 mm (1 yd 0 ft 3 in)
- Entry: Compatible high platform
- Doors: A pair on each side (hinge doors) and 16 electric sliding doors in each compartment
- Wheel diameter: 774 mm (2 ft 6.5 in)
- Wheelbase: 14,000 mm (15 yd 0 ft 11 in)
- Maximum speed: 120 km/h (75 mph)
- Weight: 35,200 kilograms (77,600 lb)
- Axle load: 8,800 kilograms (19,400 lb)
- HVAC: Central AC
- UIC classification: 2'2'
- Bogies: TB 1014
- Braking system: Compressed air (Westinghouse)
- Coupling system: Janney
- Seating: 16 seats are arranged 1-1 in the direction of travel
- Track gauge: 1067 mm

A Compartment Suite (Indonesian: Kereta Api Kelas Kompartemen) is a railway passenger coach that is a modification of wide glass executive coaches (K1 08) and airplane glass executive coaches (K1 09) produced by INKA in 2008 and 2009. The modification work was carried out by the Manggarai railway workshop. The compartment suite service is operated on Java by Kereta Api Indonesia (KAI).

The compartment train operates on the Bima and Argo Semeru services on the Gambir-Surabaya Gubeng route since 10 October 2023, on Argo Bromo Anggrek on the Gambir-Surabaya Pasarturi route since 1 June 2025, and on Sangkuriang services on the Bandung-Ketapang route since 1 May 2026. As a result, compartment services are available only on routes connecting Jakarta Gambir with Surabaya Gubeng and Surabaya Pasar Turi, also Bandung and Ketapang, Banyuwangi stations.

The service is considered a revival of sleeper train-style travel, following the end of sleeper services on the Bima and the compartment service on Senja Utama Solo in the 1990s. However, despite being called a compartment train, it is technically classified as a corridor coach, as all cabins are connected by a central aisle.

== History ==
Sleeper trains were operated from the Staatsspoorwegen era through the Perumka era for overnight services, including the Java Nacht Express and later the Bima train during the PNKA and PJKA periods. Over time, these services were gradually discontinued due to financial and social issues, including high ticket prices, high maintenance costs, and reported misuse of on board facilities. Sleeper train services effectively ended in the 1990s with the withdrawal of the sleeping coach service on the Senja Utama Solo trains.

To improve passenger comfort, KAI introduced a seated premium service branded as the "Luxury Sleeper" in 2018. Despite its name, this service is often mistaken for a sleeper train coach. It is not considered a true sleeper service because the seats recline only up to 150 degrees, meaning passengers remain in a seated position. Two generations of the Luxury class coaches have been produced, all manufactured by INKA in Madiun.

As a further development aimed at offering a higher level of interior comfort and privacy, KAI later introduced a corridor compartment coach branded as Suite Class. The prototype and later production builds was assembled at the Manggarai railway workshop in 2023 using refurbished executive class coaches originally built in 2008. The service, later referred to as the compartment suite, was officially launched on 28 September 2023 to coincide with the 78th anniversary of Kereta Api Indonesia, and entered commercial operation on 10 October 2023 on the Bima and Argo Semeru services between Gambir and Surabaya Gubeng. Starting on 1 June 2025, compartment suite coaches are also available on the Argo Bromo Anggrek train (Gambir–Surabaya Pasarturi). In addition, compartment suite coach services are also available on the Sangkuriang train beginning with its first timetable trips in May of 2026 (on the Bandung–Ketapang route).

== Facilities ==
The compartment coach has 16 rooms, each with a single seat, accommodating only one person. The seats can recline 180° to form beds and are equipped with heating and massage devices.

The compartments are connected by aisles and feature electric sliding doors, adjustable lighting, and spacious restrooms. The train also features entertainment facilities in the form of a tablet computer with a limited Android.

== Service ==
Trains using the Compartment Suite coach currently are:

- Argo Semeru and Bima, between Gambir and Surabaya Gubeng
- Argo Bromo Anggrek, between Gambir and Surabaya Pasarturi
- Sangkuriang, between Bandung and Ketapang

== Incident ==
- On 17 October 2023, in Kulon Progo, between Wates and Sentolo stations, the Argo Semeru derailed. In the same time from the opposite direction, the Argo Wilis hit the side of the Argo Semeru, injuring 31 people. Also the Compartment Suite interior were serious damage as an incident.
- On 1 August 2025, the 1 Argo Bromo Anggrek derailed at the Pegaden Baru railway station yard include 2 Compartment Suite train sets, Subang Regency, West Java. There were no fatalities from this incident, but 1 person suffered minor injuries.

== See also ==
- Panoramic
- Argo Semeru
- Bima
- Argo Bromo Anggrek
- Sangkuriang
