= Surabaya Kota railway station =

Railway station in Indonesia

Surabaya Kota Station Stasiun Surabaya Kota PD01 SP01

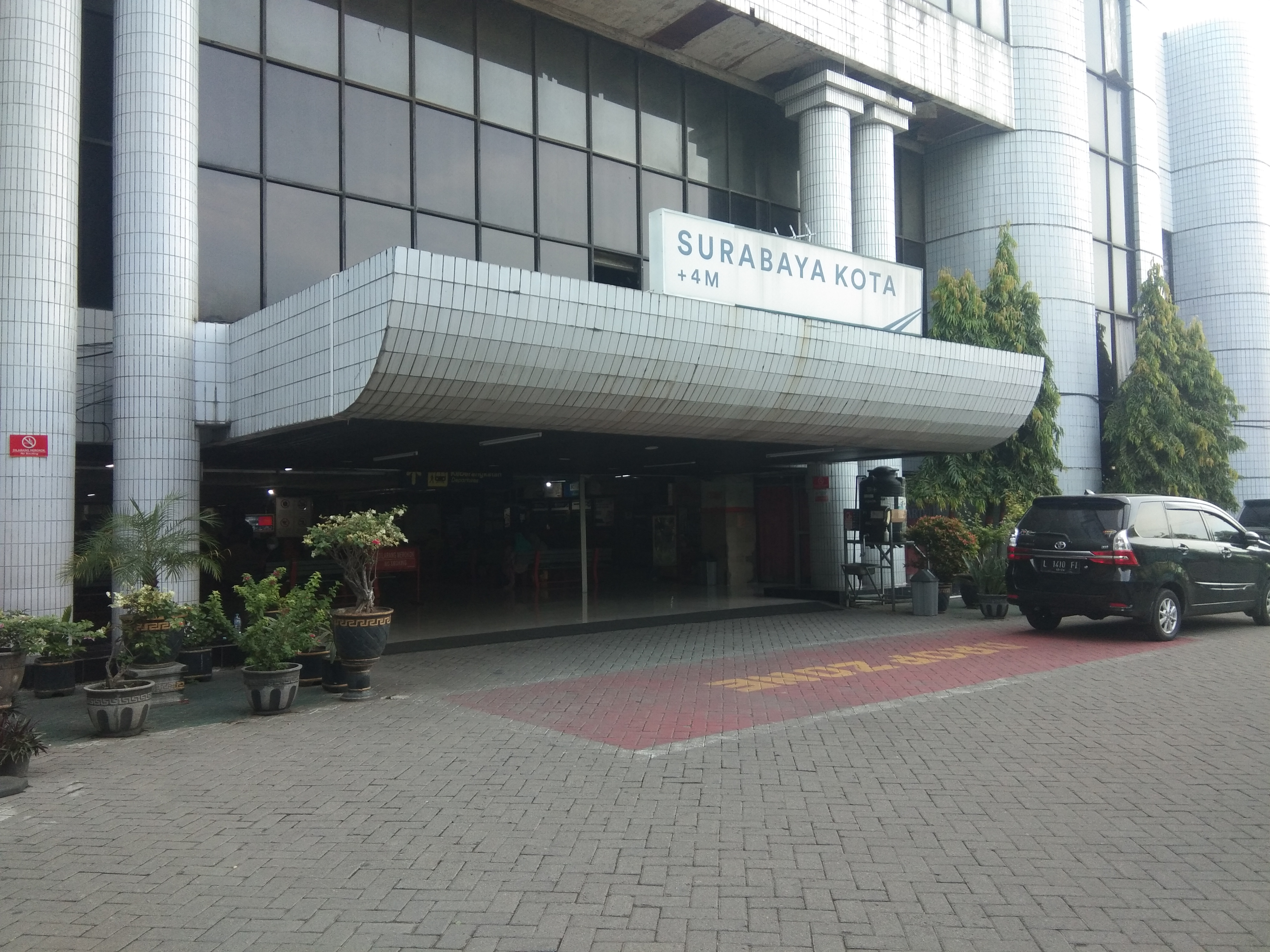
- Surabaya Kota Station entrance in 2022, attached with Plaza Indo shopping center

General information
- Other names: Semut Station
- Location: Jl. Stasiun Kota no. 9, Bongkaran, Pabean Cantikan, Surabaya; East Java; Indonesia
- Coordinates: 7.243°S 112.741°E
- Elevation: +4 m (13 ft)
- Owner: Kereta Api Indonesia
- Operator: Kereta Api Indonesia
- Platforms: 1 island platform 2 side platforms
- Tracks: 4
- Connections: Suroboyo Bus: R2

Construction
- Structure type: Ground
- Parking: Available
- Accessible: Available

Other information
- Station code: SB • 4510
- Classification: Large type C

History
- Opened: 16 May 1878; 148 years ago (old building); 22 April 1986; 40 years ago (new building)
- Former names: Soerabaja Station, Soerabaia Station

Services
Preceding station		Following station
Terminus	Commuter Line Supas	Surabaya Gubeng SP02 towards Pasuruan or Probolinggo
Terminus	Commuter Line Penataran East Java Circular Line (clockwise)	Surabaya Gubeng PD02 towards Malang, Blitar, Kertosono or Surabaya Kota
Terminus	Commuter Line Dhoho East Java Circular Line (counter-clockwise)	Surabaya Gubeng PD02 towards Kertosono, Blitar, Malang or Surabaya Kota
Location
- Location within Surabaya

Surabaya Kota Station (SB) is a railway station in Bongkaran, Pabean Cantikan, Surabaya, East Java, Indonesia. The local people usually call it Semut Station.

== History ==
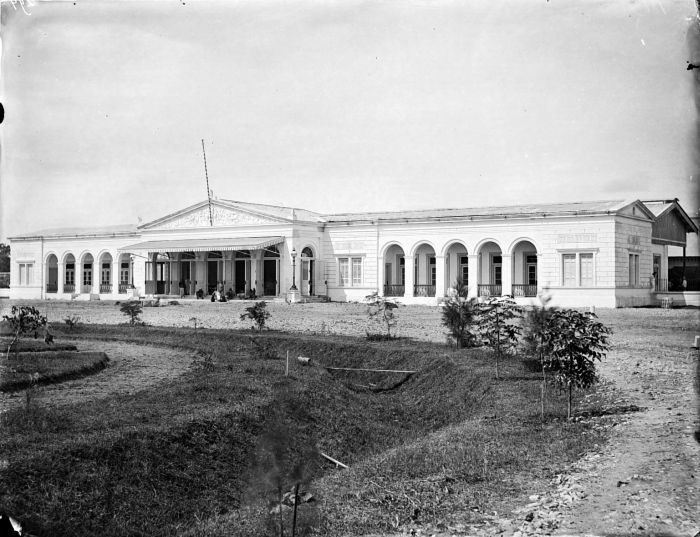
The first old station building, built before 1899

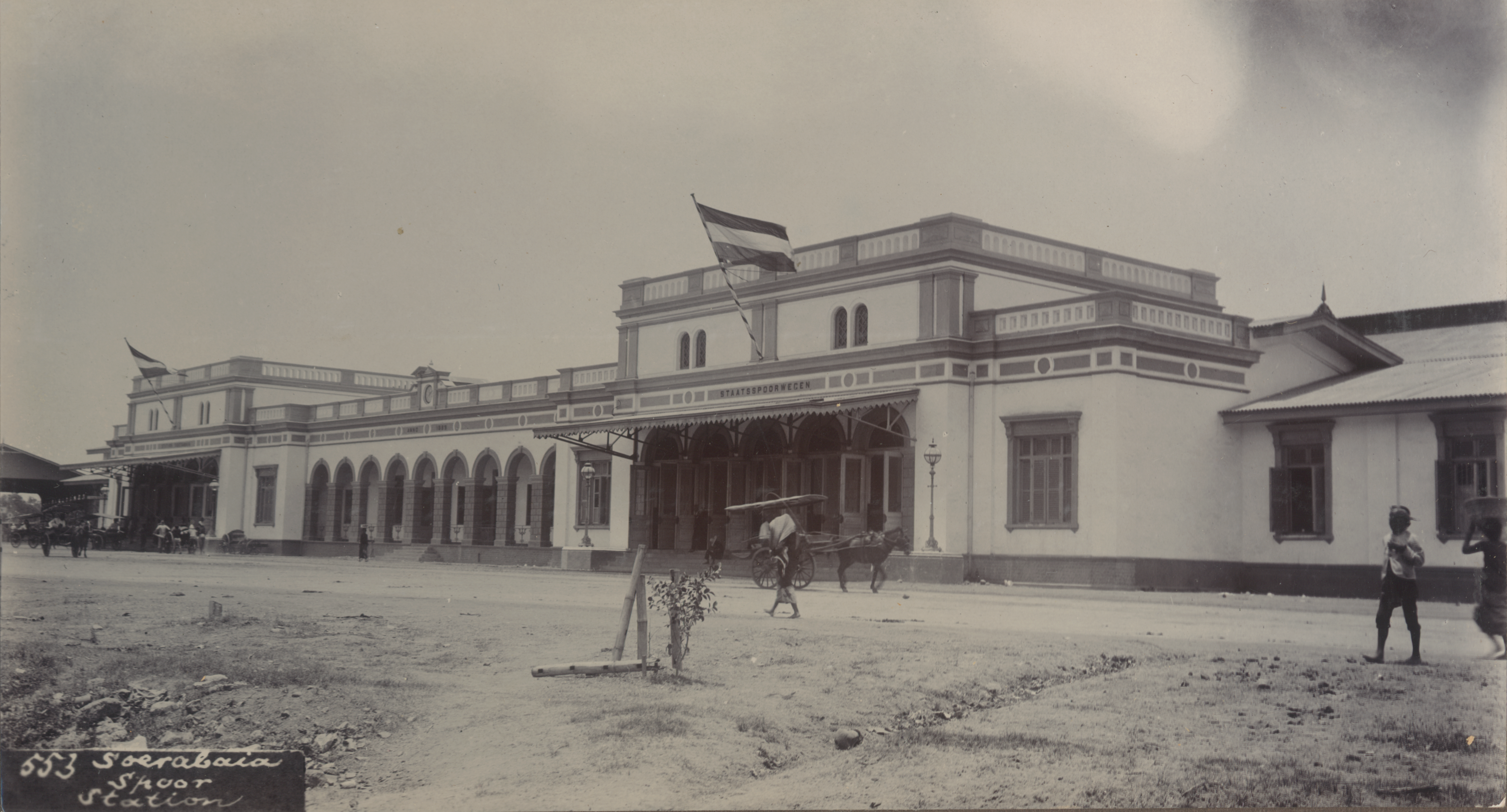
The second and present old station building which had been rebuilt after 1899

Surabaya Kota Station is the first train station owned by Staatsspoorwegen (SS), a railway operator belonging to the Dutch East Indies Government. Based on its history, this station was built when the Surabaya–Malang and Pasuruan railroads were pioneered around 1870. The aim was to transport crops and plantations from the inland area of East Java, especially from Malang, to the Port of Tanjung Perak which also began to be built around that year. This building was inaugurated on 16 May 1878. With the increasing use of trains, in 1899, the old station building was finally torn down and replaced with the new building that exists today.

Surabaya Kota Station became the terminal station for the best express trains of its time, starting from the Eendaagsche Express which connected Jakarta with Surabaya in the fastest time of 11 hours 30 minutes in the 1930s, to the Bima night express train which reached the early 1990s brought the sleeper train.

This train station was designated as a cultural heritage by the Mayor of Surabaya. The station is designated as a building that must be maintained along with 60 other buildings in Surabaya. Its existence is threatened by plans to build shopping centers and shopping areas that threaten to destroy the authenticity of the station's landscape, such as the Jakarta Kota Station in Jakarta. There was even a demolition of the area which ironically involved PT Kereta Api Indonesia.

== Building and layout ==
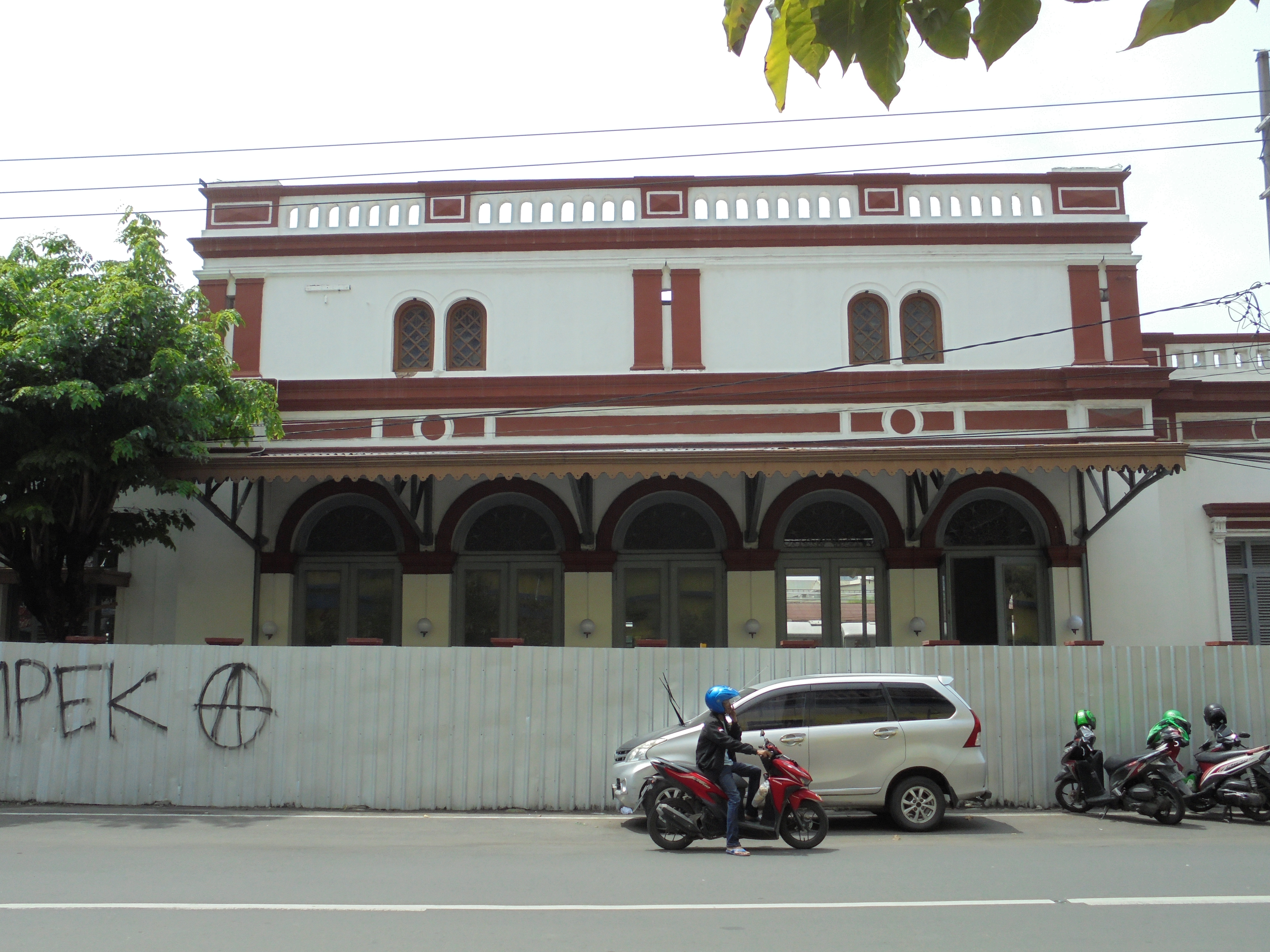
The old building of the station which has been designated as cultural heritage (2020)

Located at the center of the city, the station is also the oldest railway station in Surabaya, built in 1875 and opened in 1878. The station has two buildings, the old building is located at the north-east of the newer building, whereas the new building is located at the end of the tracks. The historic old building was demolished because of mall building near the station, but the mall building process was stopped because it didn't have a building license, and the old building has been protected and chosen as one of the heritages in Surabaya.

Surabaya Kota Station has a total of twelve train lines: four tracks serve as arrivals and departures for passengers with lines 1 and 2 being straight tracks, while the remaining eight lines are buffer stops which are used as storage/parking lots for trains, except for trains. Jayakarta train, which was originally parked at this station, has now moved to Surabaya Pasarturi Station because this train has a long series of 15 trains in one train set.

The station still using mechanical signals to preserve its classical style and has two signal boxes near the exit signal. The station was very strategic, it is located near a market that is one of the most famous markets in Surabaya, Pasar Atum, it also located near Sunan Ampel's tomb.

There are many train car shunting activities, especially at the morning and the evening when many trains are departing and arriving at the station. The station doesn't have a locomotive depot, the locomotive depot is located at Sidotopo station located at north-east of the station. Surabaya Gubeng station is located at south-east of the station about three kilometers far. Uniquely these three stations formed a triangle shaped railway, but the railway between Surabaya Kota with Surabaya Gubeng is a double tracked railway, the others are Single Tracks.

== Services ==
Passenger trains that use this station are:

=== Economy class ===
- Sri Tanjung, to Lempuyangan and Ketapang

=== Commuter and local trains ===
- Dhoho Commuter Line, from and to Blitar via Kertosono
- Penataran Commuter Line, from and to Blitar via Malang
- Tumapel Commuter Line, from Malang
- Ekonomi Lokal Kertosono, from and to Kertosono
- Komuter Surabaya–Bangil, from and to Bangil
- Sindro Commuter Line, from and to Sidoarjo
- Supas Commuter Line, from and to Pasuruan
- Jenggala Commuter Line, from and to Mojokerto

== Supporting transportation ==
Public transportation type	Route	Destination
Bemo	C	Sedayu–Demak–Menjangan (via Indrapura)
Bemo	D	RSI–Joyoboyo–Kupang–Pasar Turi–Sidorame
Bemo	M	Joyoboyo–Dinoyo–Undaan–Jembatan Merah Plaza (Kalimas Barat)
Bemo	R	Jembatan Merah Plaza (Kalimas Barat)–Kapasan–Kenjeran
Bemo	DA	Darmo Permai–Pasar Atom
Bemo	DA	Citraland–Jembatan Merah Plaza–Krembangan
Suroboyo Bus	R2	Rajawali–Purabaya (transfer at Tugu Pahlawan bus stop)

== Gallery ==
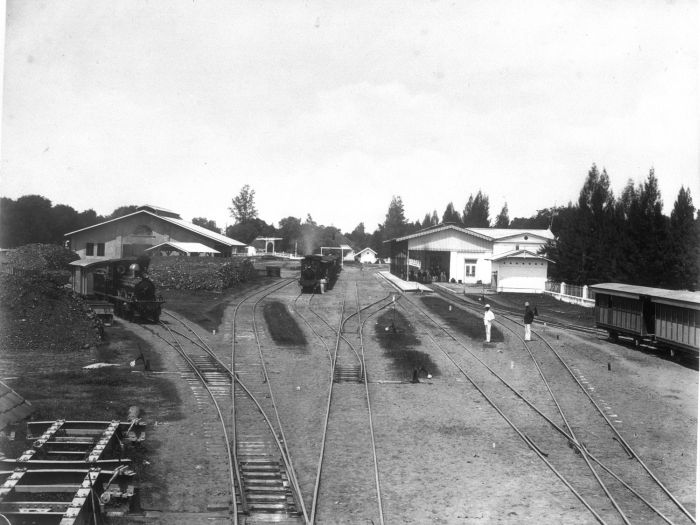
Surabaya Kota Station when still using the old building

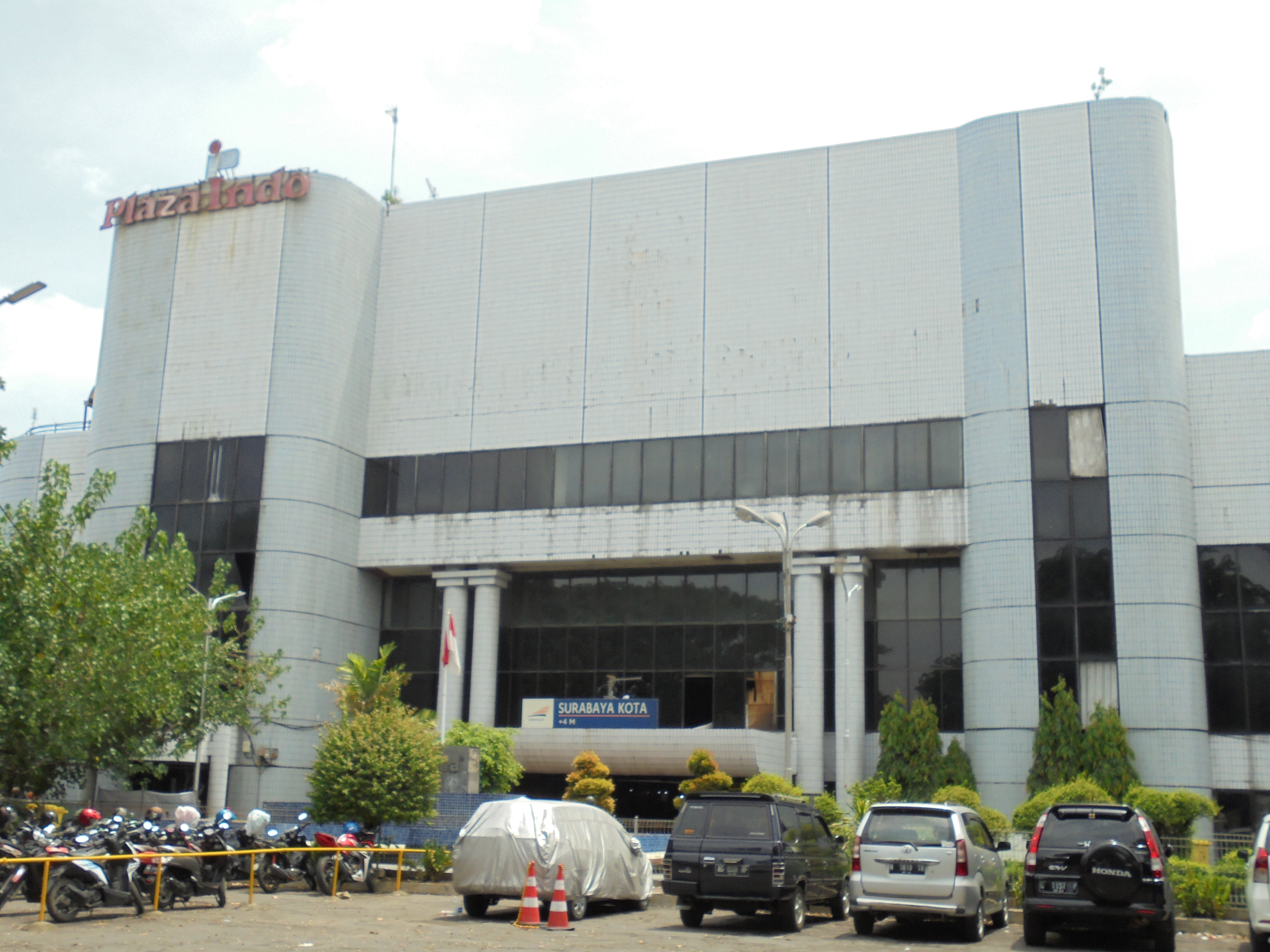
Surabaya Kota Station/Plaza Indo entrance in 2020

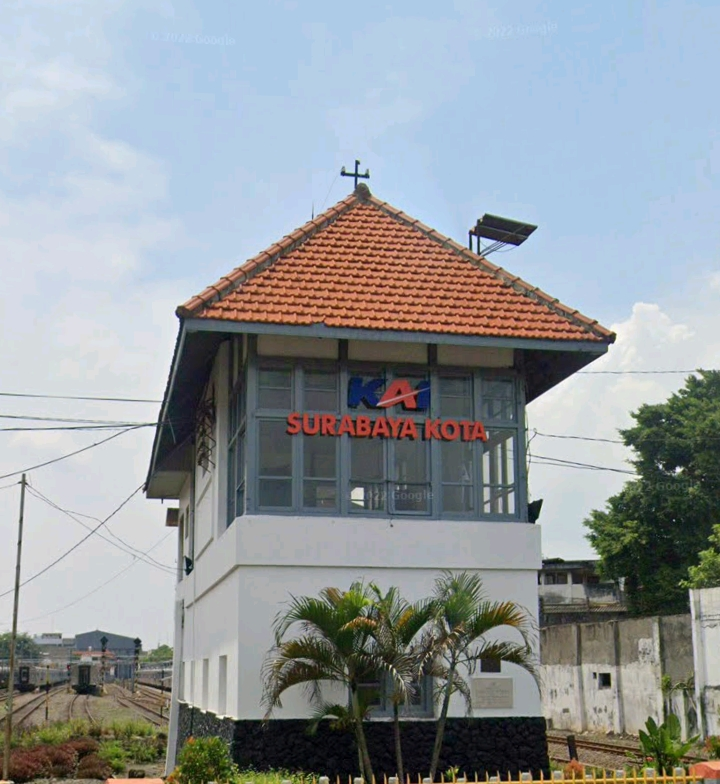
The station's east signal tower in 2022
