= Argo Semeru =

Indonesian passenger train service

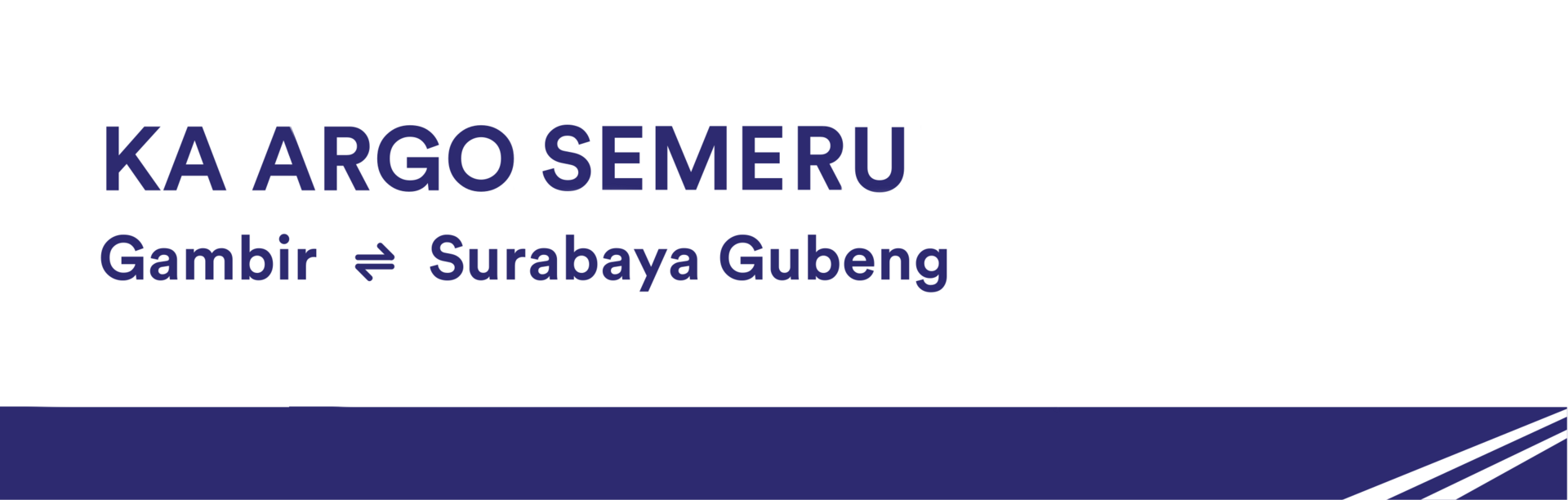

- Argo Semeru Train with Stainless Steel New Generation trainset prepare to arrived in Yogyakarta Station from Jakarta

Overview
- Service type: Inter-city rail
- Status: Operational
- First service: 1 June 2023
- Current operator: Kereta Api Indonesia

Route
- Termini: Gambir; Surabaya Gubeng
- Stops: Look below
- Distance travelled: 821 km
- Average journey time: 10 hours and 22 minutes
- Service frequency: Daily each way
- Train number: 5-6

On-board services
- Classes: Executive; compartment suite
- Seating arrangements: Recline-able and rotatable seating in 2-2 configuration (only executive class)
- Catering facilities: On-board cafe and trolley service

Technical
- Rolling stock: CC206
- Track gauge: 1,067 mm
- Operating speed: 80 km/h (50 mph) to 120 km/h (75 mph)
Route map

Argo Semeru (Indonesian: Kereta api Argo Semeru) is an executive and compartment suite class train that operated by PT Kereta Api Indonesia in Java which run between Gambir Station (GMR)–Surabaya Gubeng Station (SGU) via Purwokerto and Yogyakarta. The train travels 821 kilometres (510 mi) in approximately 10 hours and 22 minutes.

The Argo Semeru train was launched on 1 June 2023, to coincide with the implementation of the train travel chart of 2023 (Gapeka 2023). Unlike the Bima train which serves on an evening schedule, the Argo Semeru train serves on a morning schedule.

== Etymology ==
The word Argo (Javanese for mountain) is a brand name of superior executive train services by PT Kereta Api Indonesia. The word of Semeru is derived from Mount Semeru, the highest peak in Java Island.

== List of station ==
Province	City/District	Station	Information
Special Capital Region of Jakarta		Gambir	Terminus station, integrated with Transjakarta BRT service
Special Capital Region of Jakarta		Jatinegara	Only for arrivals from Surabaya, integrated with Cikarang Commuter Line and Transjakarta BRT services
West Java	Bekasi City	Bekasi	Integrated with Commuter Line Cikarang
West Java	Cirebon City	Cirebon	Located on the North Java Line
Central Java	Banyumas Regency	Purwokerto	Integrated with Trans Jateng Bus and Teman Bus (Trans Banyumas)
Central Java	Cilacap Regency	Kroya	–
Central Java	Kebumen Regency	Kebumen	–
Central Java	Purworejo Regency	Kutoarjo	Integrated with Prambanan Express Commuter Line and Trans Jateng Bus
Central Java	Surakarta City	Solo Balapan	Integrated with Yogyakarta Commuter Line, Adi Soemarmo International Airport Train, Batik Solo Trans Bus, and Trans Jateng Bus
Special Region of Yogyakarta	Yogyakarta City	Yogyakarta	Integrated with Yogyakarta Commuter Line, Prambanan Express, Yogyakarta International Airport Train, Trans Jogja Bus, and Teman Bus Yogyakarta
East Java	Madiun City	Madiun	–
East Java	Nganjuk Regency	Nganjuk	Integrated with Commuter Line Dhoho
East Java	Nganjuk Regency	Kertosono	Integrated with Commuter Line Dhoho
East Java	Jombang Regency	Jombang	–
East Java	Mojokerto City	Mojokerto	Integrated with Commuter Line Dhoho and Commuter Line Jenggala
East Java	Surabaya City	Surabaya Gubeng	Terminus station, integrated with multiple Commuter Lines and Trans Semanggi Suroboyo Bus

== Accidents and incidents ==
- On 17 October 2023, in Kulon Progo, between Wates and Sentolo stations, this train derailed. In the same time from the opposite direction, the Argo Wilis hit the side of the Argo Semeru, injuring 31 people.
- On 7 September 2024, A truck loaded with salt was hit by the Argo Semeru train at a train crossing without a door bar in Dusun Bayem Kalang, Kampung Keras Wetan, Geneng, Ngawi. Two people were seriously injured in the accident.

== Gallery ==
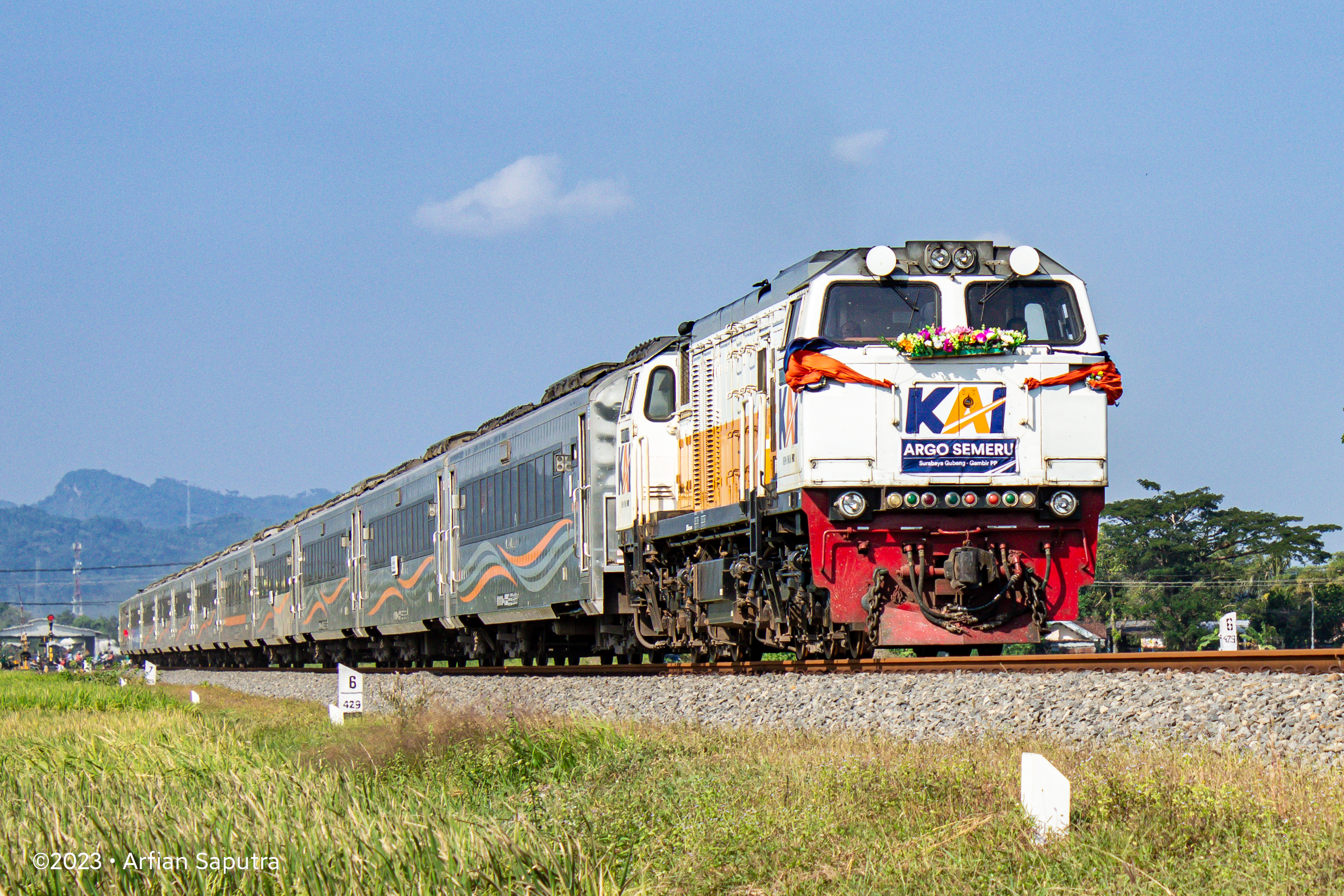
Argo Semeru passing through Gombong Station

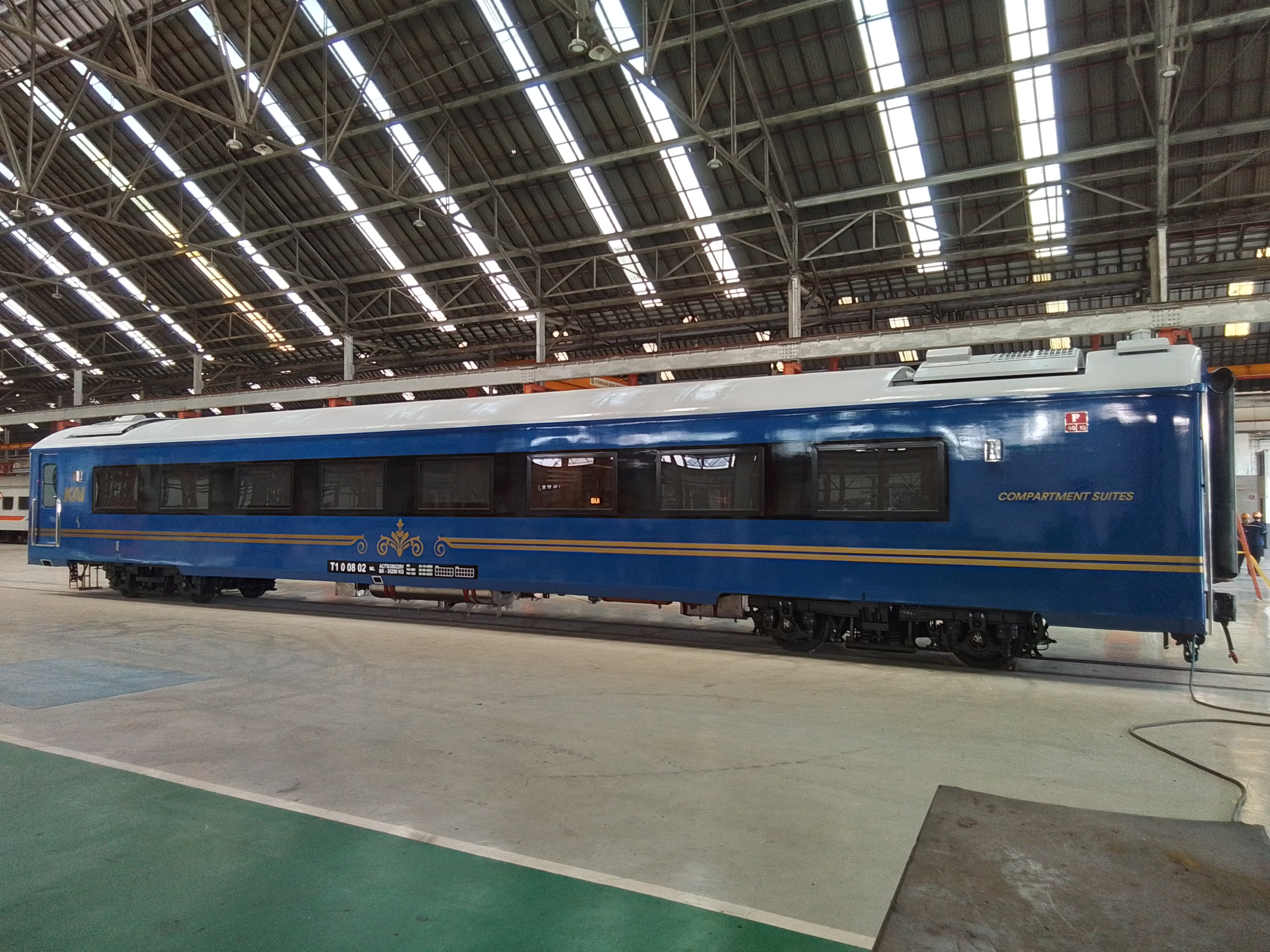
Compartment suite operated by Bima and Argo Semeru trains

Argo Semeru from Jakarta passing through Lempuyangan Station to Surabaya

Argo Semeru train from Surabaya passing through Lempuyangan Station

Argo Semeru with Nusantara Explorer locomotive livery passing through Lempuyangan Station from Surabaya.

Argo Semeru with Red And Blue locomotive livery passing through Lempuyangan Station.
