= Gadobangkong railway station =

Railway station in Indonesia

Gadobangkong Station Stasiun Gadobangkong
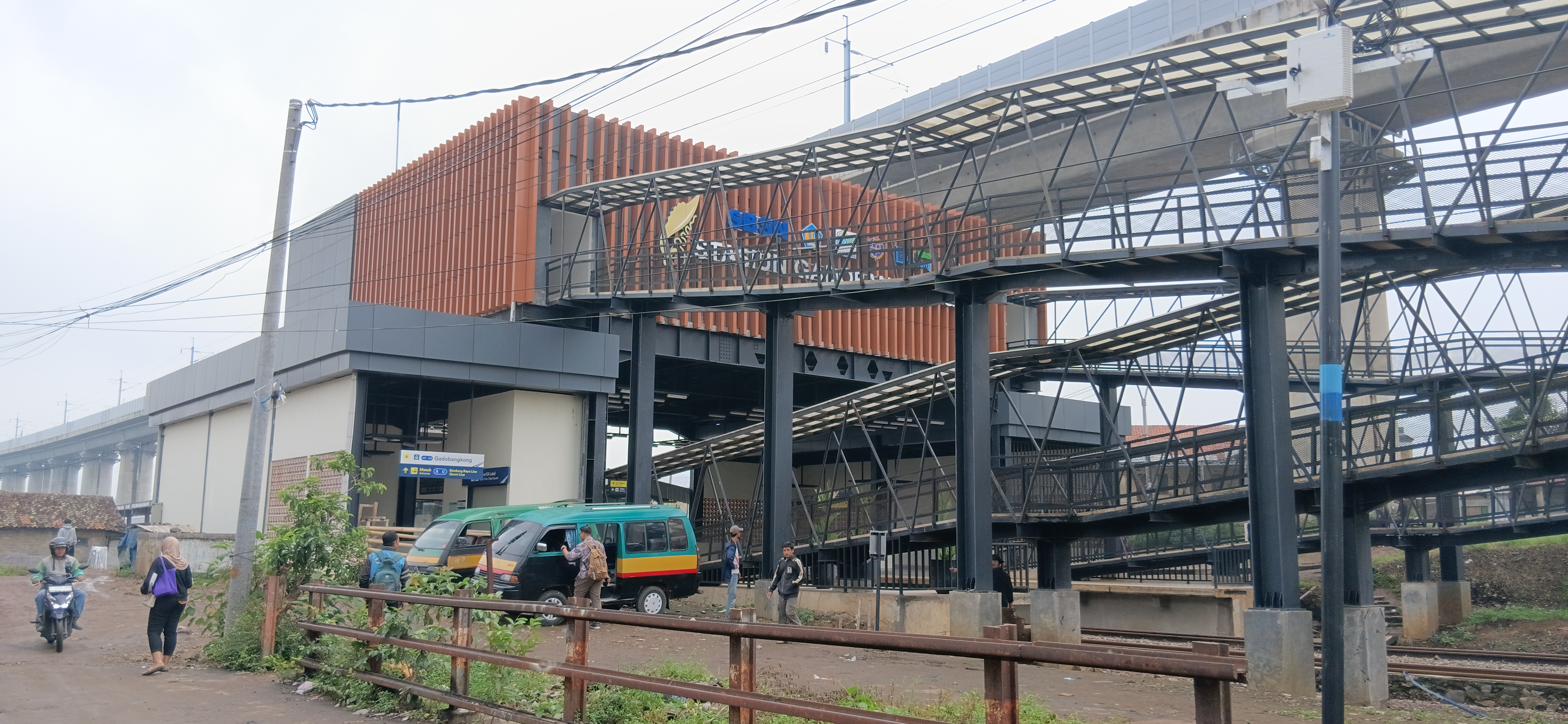
- Gadobangkong Station, photo was taken on 24 May 2025.

General information
- Location: Gadobangkong, Ngamprah, West Bandung Regency; West Java; Indonesia
- Coordinates: 6.864811°S 107.515203°E
- Elevation: 695 m (2,280 ft)
- Owner: Kereta Api Indonesia
- Operator: Kereta Api Indonesia
- Lines: Greater Bandung Commuter Line; Garut Commuter Line; Padalarang–Kasugihan
- Platforms: 1 island platform 1 side platform
- Tracks: 2
- Connections: Trans Metro Pasundan:

Construction
- Structure type: Ground
- Parking: Available
- Accessible: Yes

Other information
- Station code: GK • 1416• BANGKONG
- Classification: Halt

History
- Opened: 17 May 1884
Location
- Location within Java

Gadobangkong Station (GK) is a railway station located in Gadobangkong, Ngamprah, West Bandung Regency. The station, which is located at an elevation of 695 meters (previously 713 m), is included in the Operational Area II Bandung. The station is located not far from Jl. Raya Cimahi-Padalarang (Raya Cimahi-Padalarang Street). Gadobangkong is the station closest to the regency seat and is the most easterly station in West Bandung Regency.

== Station layout ==
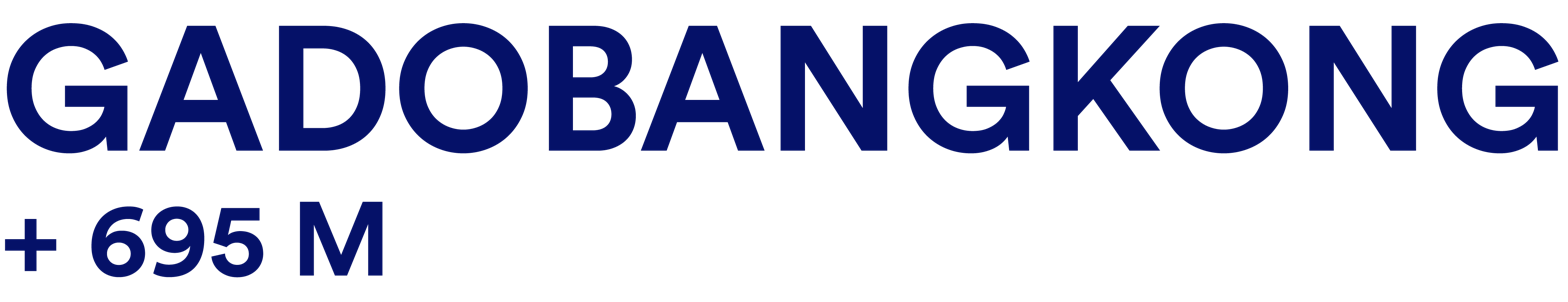
Side platform
Line 1	← (Padalarang) Greater Bandung Commuter Line to Padalarang
Line 1	← (Padalarang) Garut Commuter Line to Padalarang
Line 2	Garut Commuter Line to Cibatu/Garut (Cimahi) →
Line 2	Greater Bandung Commuter Line to Cicalengka (Cimahi) →
Side platform

== Services ==
The following is a list of train services at the Gadobangkong Station.

=== Passenger services ===
- Commuter rail
  - Garut Commuter Line, destination of Padalarang and destination of Cibatu
  - Greater Bandung Commuter Line, destination of Padalarang–Purwakarta as well as from and purpose Kiaracondong–Cicalengka (only most of the specific itinerary)

== Intermodal support ==
Public transport type	Line	Destination
Trans Metro Pasundan		Kota Baru Parahyangan – Alun-Alun Bandung
Trans Bandung Raya (DAMRI)	Corridor 15	Alun Alun-Ciburuy

Preceding station	Kereta Api Indonesia	Following station
Padalarang; Terminus	Padalarang–Kasugihan	Cimahi towards Kasugihan
