= Cimindi railway station =

Railway station in Indonesia

Cimindi Station Stasiun Cimindi
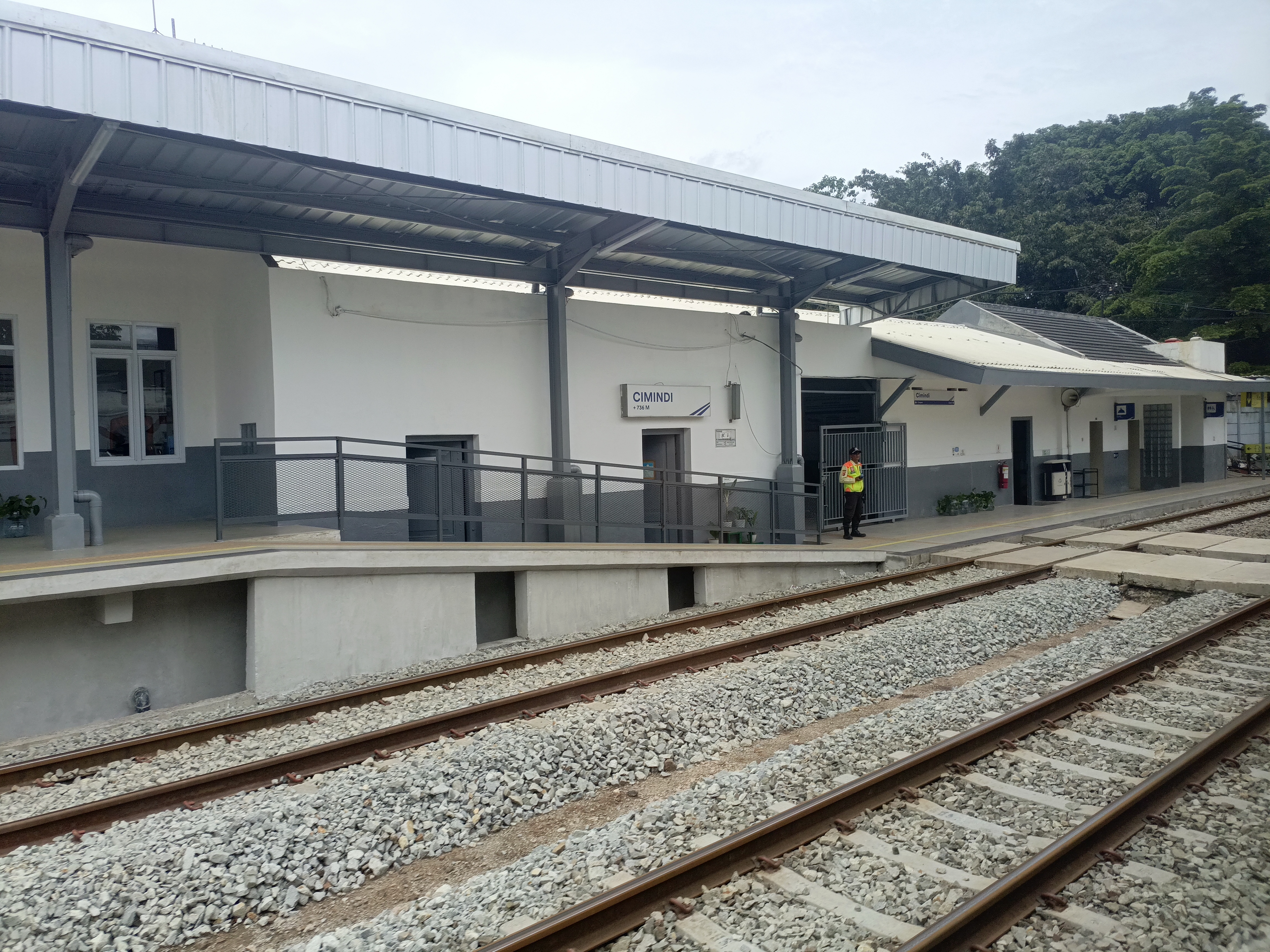
- Cimindi Station, 2024

General information
- Location: Campaka, Andir, Bandung; West Java; Indonesia
- Coordinates: 6.896178°S 107.56112°E
- Elevation: 736 m (2,415 ft)
- Owner: Kereta Api Indonesia
- Operator: Kereta Api Indonesia
- Line: Padalarang–Kasugihan
- Platforms: 2 side platforms
- Tracks: 3

Construction
- Structure type: Ground
- Parking: Available
- Accessible: Available

Other information
- Station code: CMD; Call sign CIMINDI
- Classification: Class II

History
- Opened: 17 May 1884
Location
- Location within Bandung

Cimindi Station (CMD) is a class II railway station located in Campaka, Andir, Bandung. The station, which is located at an elevation of 380 meters, is included in the Operation Area II Bandung and is the westernmost station in the city of Bandung.

Since April 6, 1999, the station has used electric signaling produced by Alstom.

== Services ==
The following is a list of train services at the Cimindi Station.

=== Passenger services ===
- Local economy
  - Garut Commuter Line, terminating at Purwakarta and Garut
  - Greater Bandung Commuter Line, terminating at Purwakarta and Cicalengka

Preceding station	Kereta Api Indonesia	Following station
Cimahi towards Padalarang	Padalarang–Kasugihan	Andir towards Kasugihan
