= Cimahi railway station =

Railway station in Indonesia

Cimahi Station Stasiun Cimahi
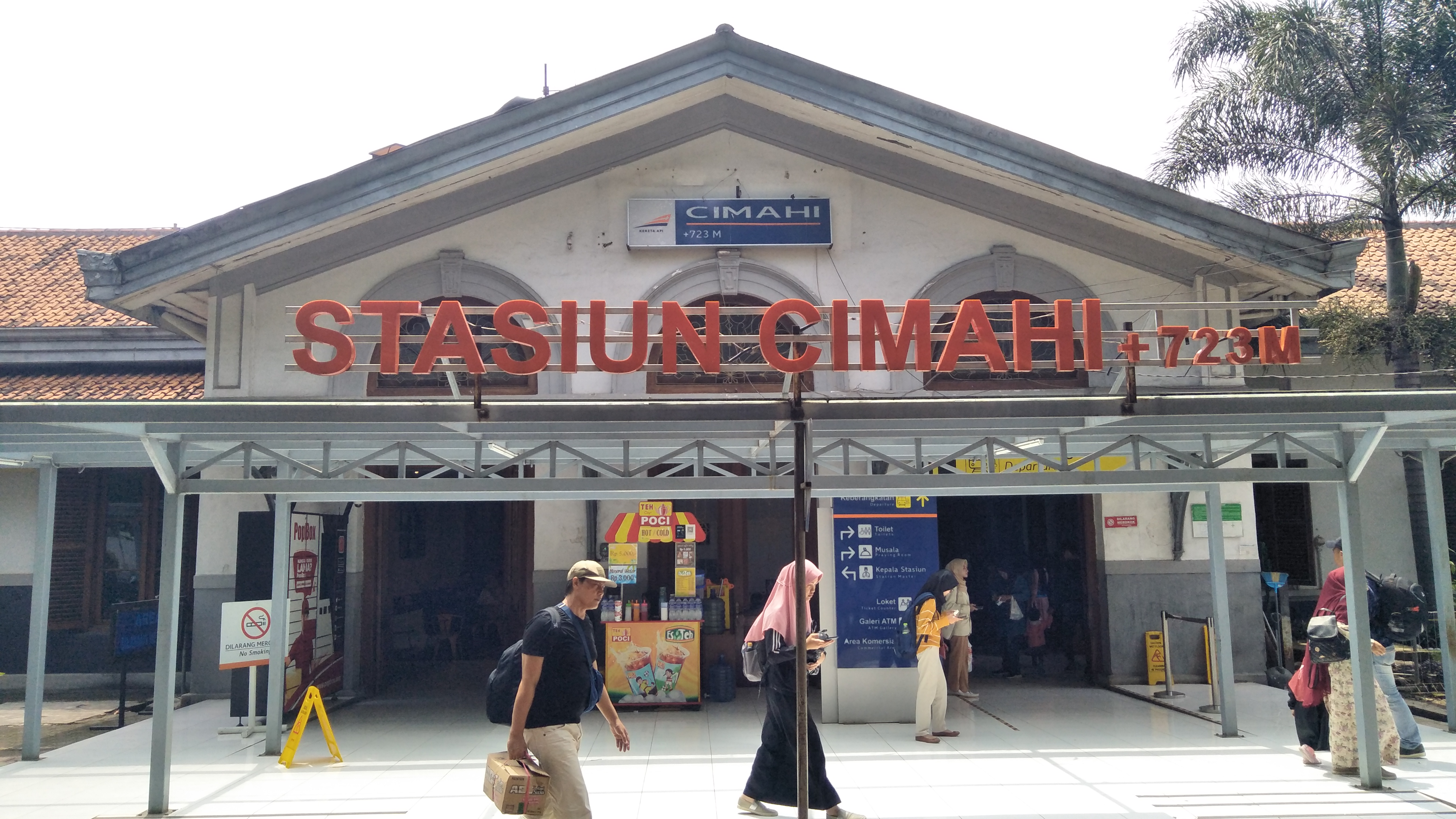
- The front view of Cimahi Station

General information
- Location: Jl. Stasiun Cimahi No. 1, Baros, Cimahi; West Java; Indonesia
- Coordinates: 6.88583°S 107.536°E
- Elevation: 723 m (2,372 ft)
- Owner: Kereta Api Indonesia
- Operator: Kereta Api Indonesia
- Lines: Garut Commuter Line; Greater Bandung Commuter Line; HSR Feeder Train; Padalarang–Kasugihan
- Platforms: 1 side platform 2 island platforms
- Tracks: 4

Construction
- Structure type: Ground
- Parking: Available
- Cycle facilities: Available
- Accessible: Available
- Architectural style: Neoclassical

Other information
- Station code: CMI • 1420
- Classification: Large class type C

History
- Opened: 17 May 1884
Location
- Location within Java

Cimahi Station (CMI) (Sundanese: ᮞ᮪ᮒᮞᮤᮇᮔ᮪ ᮎᮤᮙᮠᮤ, romanized: Stasion Cimahi) is a class II railway station located in Baros, Padalarang, West Bandung Regency. It is on Jalan Stasiun (Station Street), Bandung Barat. The station, which is located at an elevation of 723 meters, is included in the Operational Area II Bandung.

== History ==
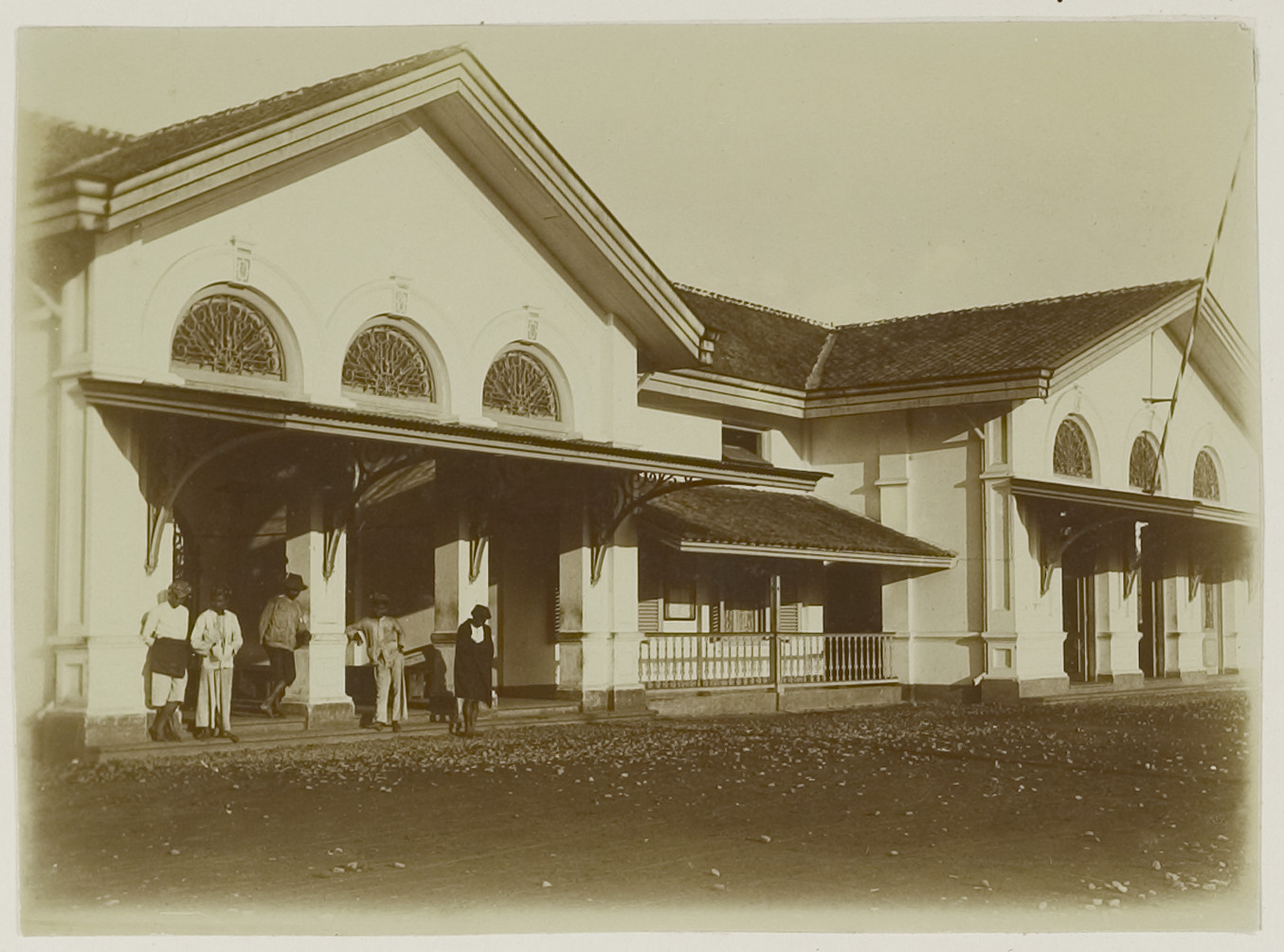
The front view of the station, c. 1907

The Cimahi region has become known since 1811 when the Governor General of the Dutch East Indies at the time, Herman Willem Daendels led the Anyer–Panarukan road construction project. At that time Daendels assigned forced laborers to set up a guard post near what would become Cimahi Alun-alun (square).

Plans to grow the area had been initiated in the 1880s by making plans for the military town of Cimahi and the center of government in the city of Bandung. Implementation of the plan then commenced with establishing Cimahi Station. The construction of this station was initiated by the Staatsspoorwegen (SS), a railway company belonging to the Dutch East Indies Colonial Government. This station began to fully operate on 17 May 1884, simultaneously with the opening of the Padalarang–Bandung railway line.

After the construction of this station, in 1886, Cimahi was designed to be a center for education, training and military barracks that supported the military center in Bandung. To meet this need, soldiers and their families were provided with facilities such as military housing, military hospitals, shooting ranges, meeting halls, cinemas, churches, burial complexes, swimming pools, and there was a military detention center at the station. This military area began to fully materialize in 1896.

Approximately 200 m to the east or towards Cimindi Station there may have been spur lines leading to Pusdikjas and Pusdikpal which were laid during the Dutch era, although details are scant due to secrecy attached to the area being designated a Military City by the Dutch East Indies Government. Speculation is based on the fact that there used to be remnants of rails on the side of the road which are now covered in concrete and asphalt.

Since 6 April 1999, this station has used electrical signaling system produced by Alstom.

== Architecture ==
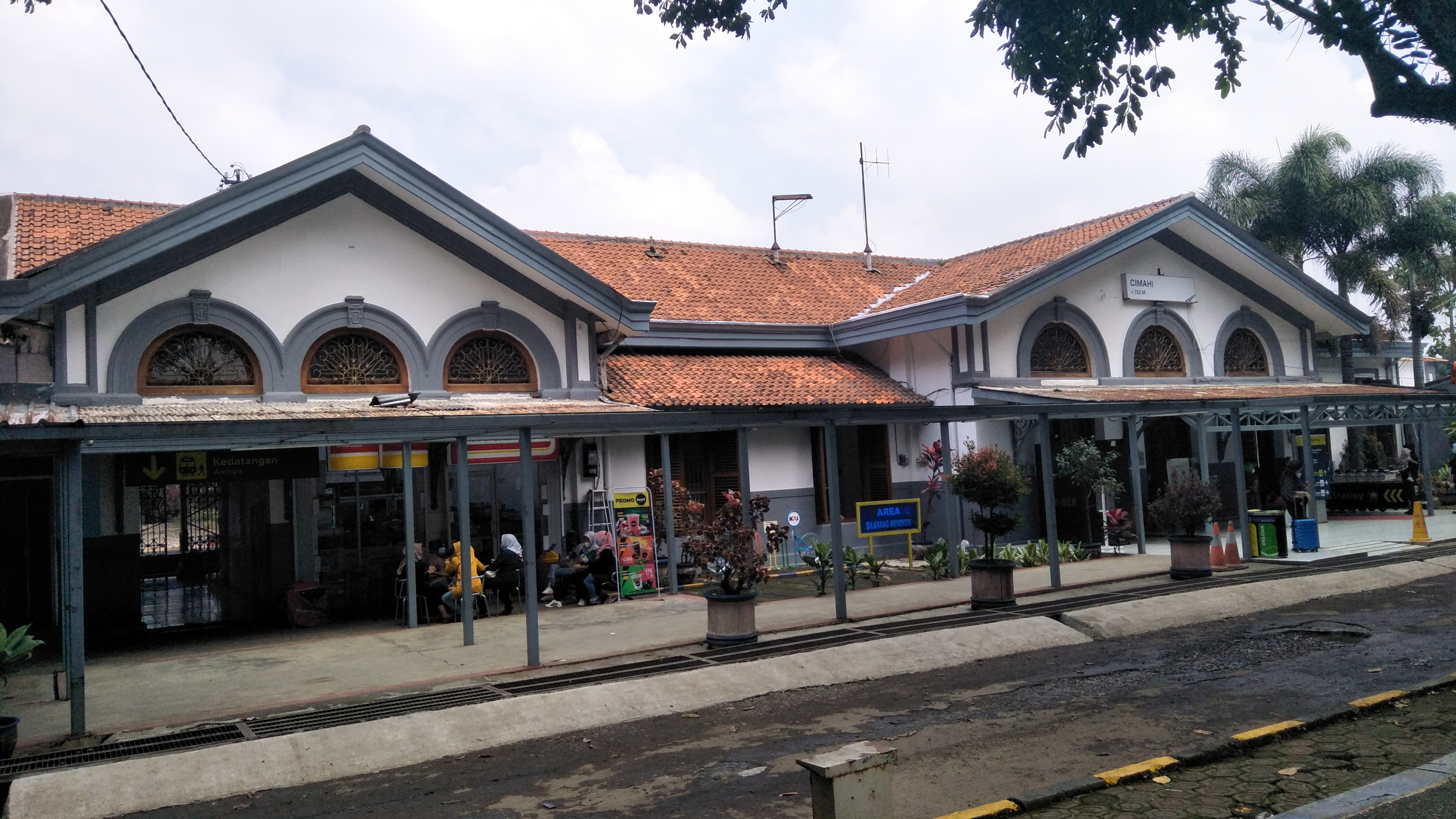
The front view of the station, 2021

The architecture of this station on the inside is similar to other SS stations of the era, but the facade looks different. The vernacular character of this station is very prominent, it can be seen from the use of symmetry on the front facade with the main departure gate in the middle of the building. The main station building has no pillars. The windows look classic with iron louvers in the form of semicircular geometric ornaments on the vents, typical of the SS, while the jalousie windows below are made of wood. The roof has adapted its shape to the tropical climate of the Dutch East Indies and has a gorge. The characteristics of the station as a public facility can be seen from the absence of terrace stairs and porch railings. When compared to The Historich Building (Societeit voor Officieren) which is located to the northeast of the station complex, the use of the station is more public than the function of The Historich which tends to be private, so the architecture chosen for the building is Neoclassical.

== Station layout ==
This station originally had five tracks, with line 1 and 2 being straight tracks, but only four remain.

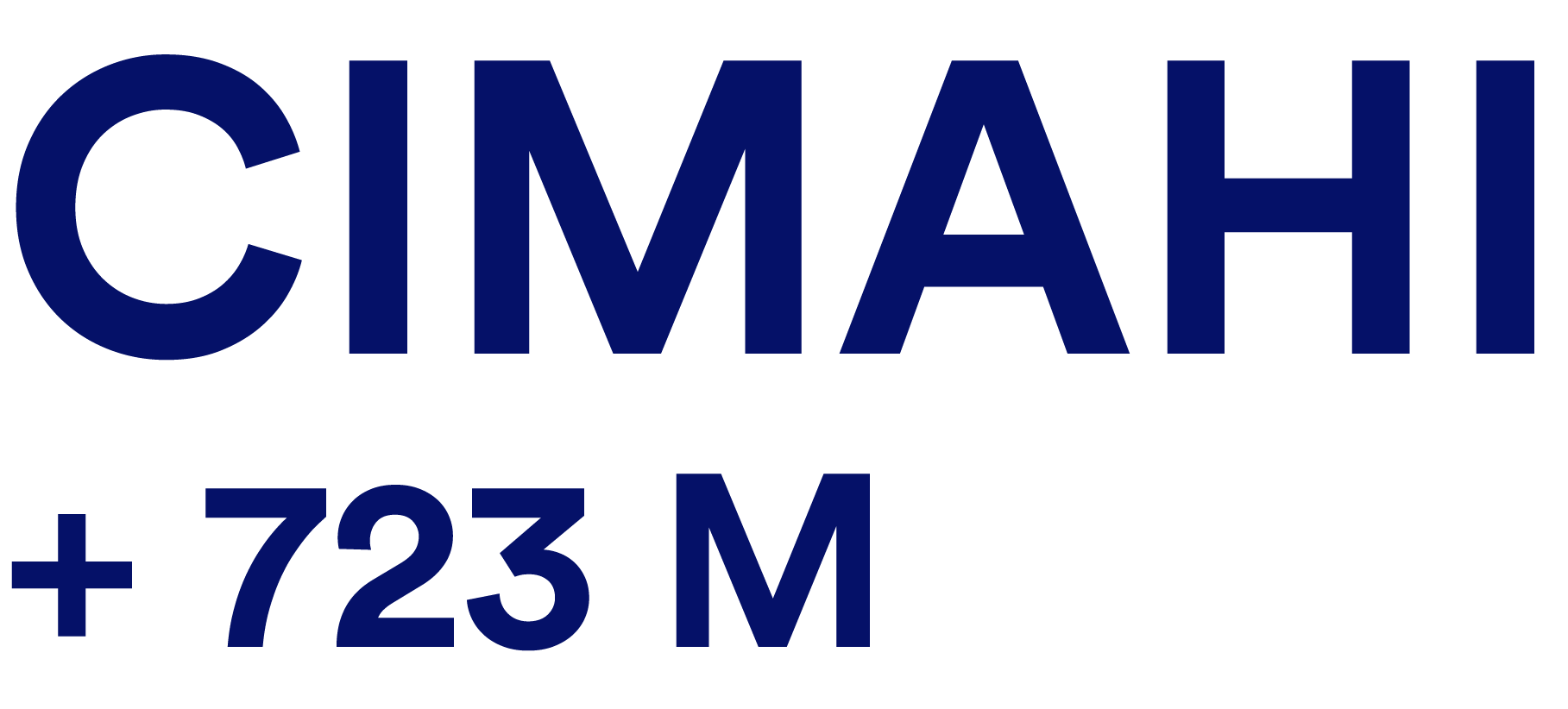
Main building
Side platform
Line 1

Inter-city train stop to Cikampek

Straight tracks to Cikampek

← (Padalarang)
HSR Feeder Train to Padalarang

← (Gadobangkong)
Garut Commuter Line to Padalarang/Purwakarta

Greater Bandung Commuter Line to Padalarang/Purwakarta

Island platform
Line 2

Inter-city train stop to Bandung

Straight tracks to Bandung

HSR Feeder Train to Bandung
(Bandung) →

Garut Commuter Line to Cibatu/Garut

Greater Bandung Commuter Line to Cicalengka

(Cimindi) →
Island platform
Line 3

Turning tracks to Bandung and Cikampek

Line 4

Rail siding

== Services ==
The following is a list of train services at the Cimahi Station.

=== Passenger services ===
- Executive class
  - Argo Parahyangan, to Gambir and to Bandung
- Mixed class
  - Argo Parahyangan, to Gambir and to Bandung (executive–economy)
  - Ciremai, to Bandung and to Semarang Tawang (executive–business)
  - Harina, to Bandung and to Surabaya Pasar Turi (executive–economy)
  - Pangandaran, to Gambir and to Banjar (executive–economy)
- Economy class
  - Serayu, to Pasar Senen and to Purwokerto via Kroya
- Local/commuter trains
  - Greater Bandung Commuter Line, to Padalarang/Purwakarta and to Cicalengka
  - Garut Commuter Line, to Padalarang/Purwakarta and to Cibatu/Garut
  - HSR Feeder Train, to Padalarang and to Bandung

== Supporting transportation ==
The following list is the available supporting transportation modes at Cimahi Station.

Public transportation type	Route number	Route	Destination
Angkot	–	Bandung Station–Cimahi–Padalarang	Bandung Station bus terminal
Angkot	–	Bandung Station–Cimahi–Padalarang	Padalarang Tagog market
Angkot	–	Leuwi Panjang–Cimahi–Padalarang	Leuwi Panjang bus terminal
Angkot	–	Leuwi Panjang–Cimahi–Padalarang	Padalarang Tagog market

== Gallery ==
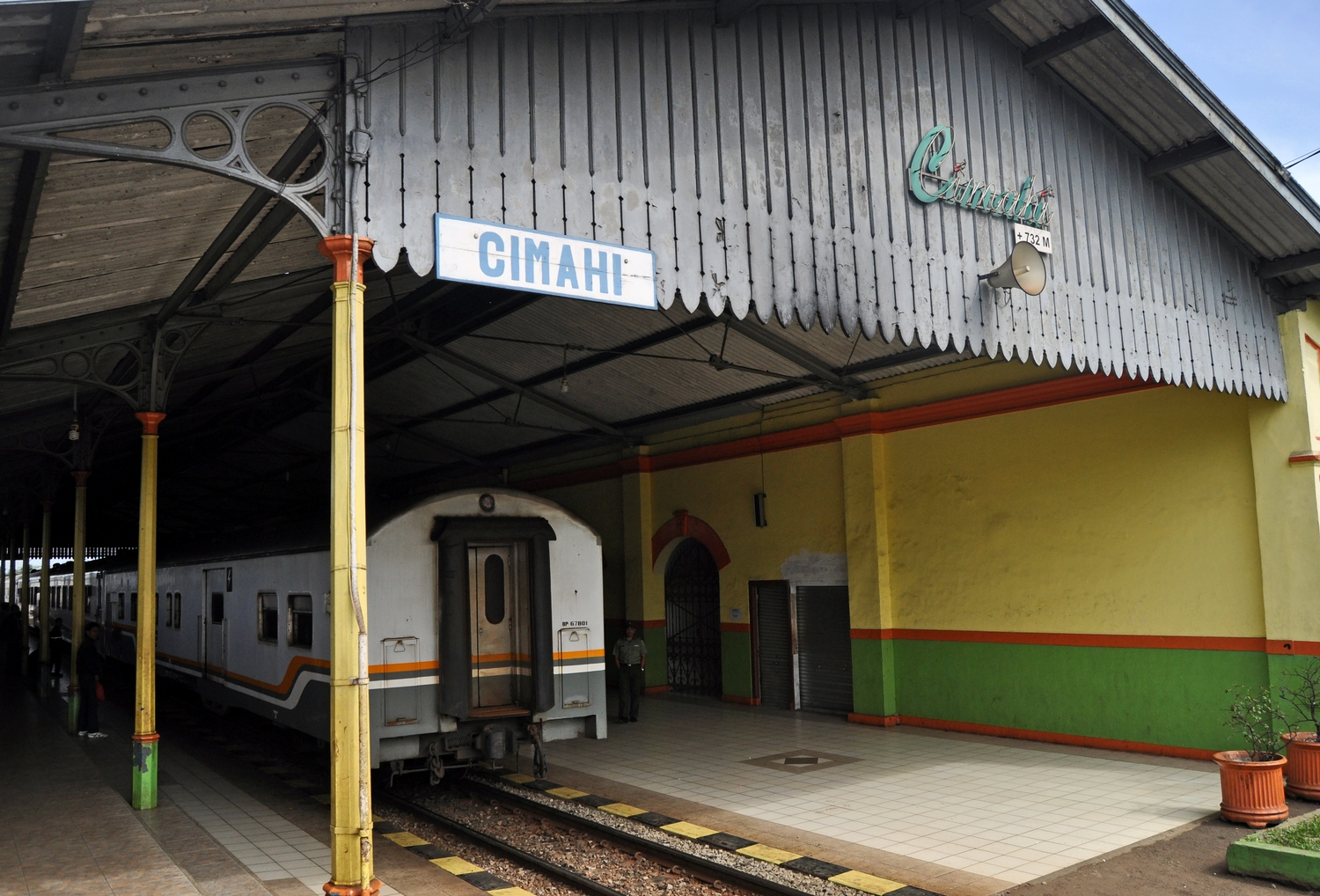
The platform of the station, with the Argo Parahyangan train heading to Jakarta (2010)

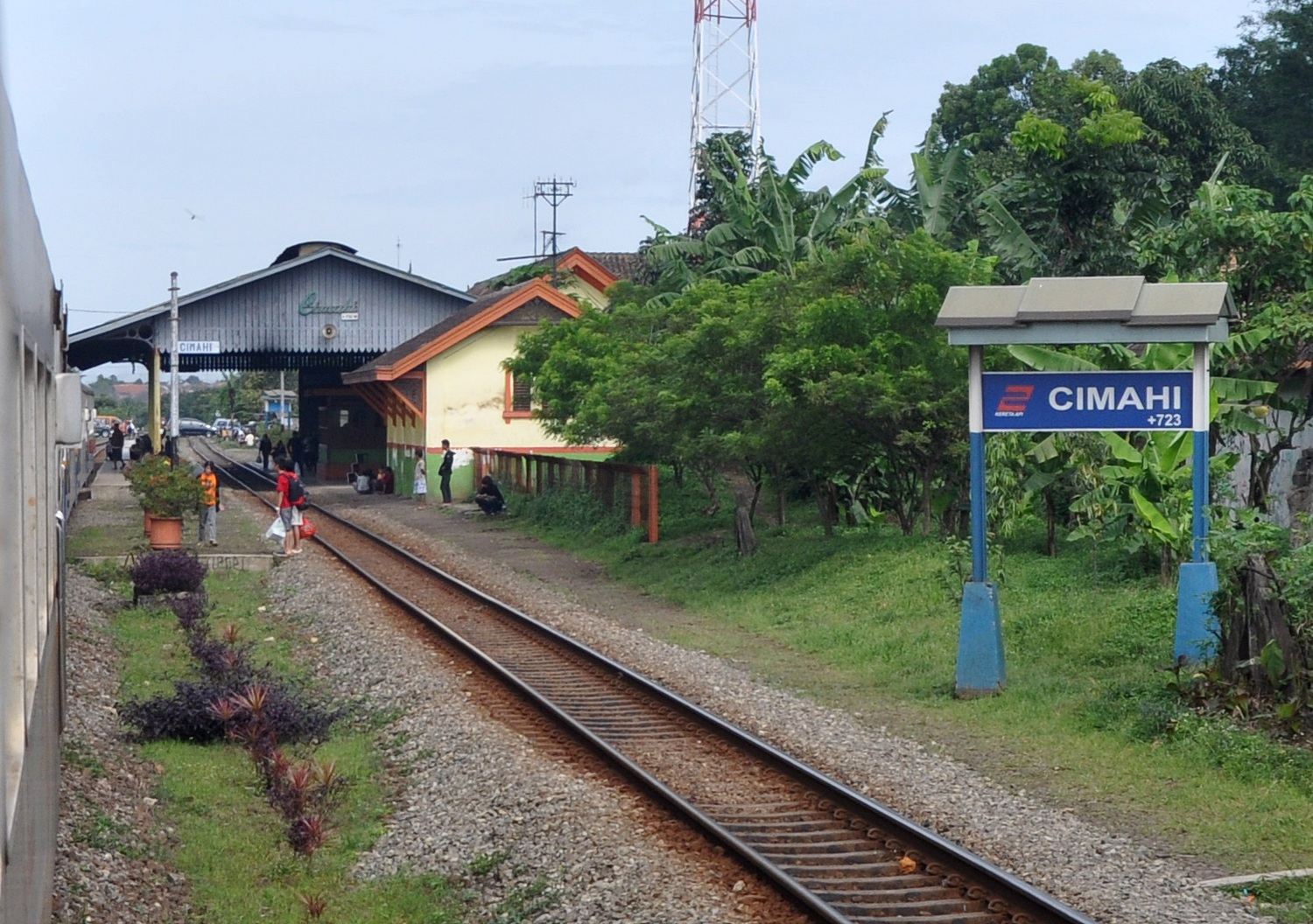
The emplacement of the station seen from the east, with its signage at right (2010)

Preceding station	Kereta Api Indonesia	Following station
Gadobangkong towards Padalarang	Padalarang–Kasugihan	Cimindi towards Kasugihan
