= Garut Commuter Line =

Commuter rail system in Garut, Indonesia

Garut Commuter Line Garut - Purwakarta Line

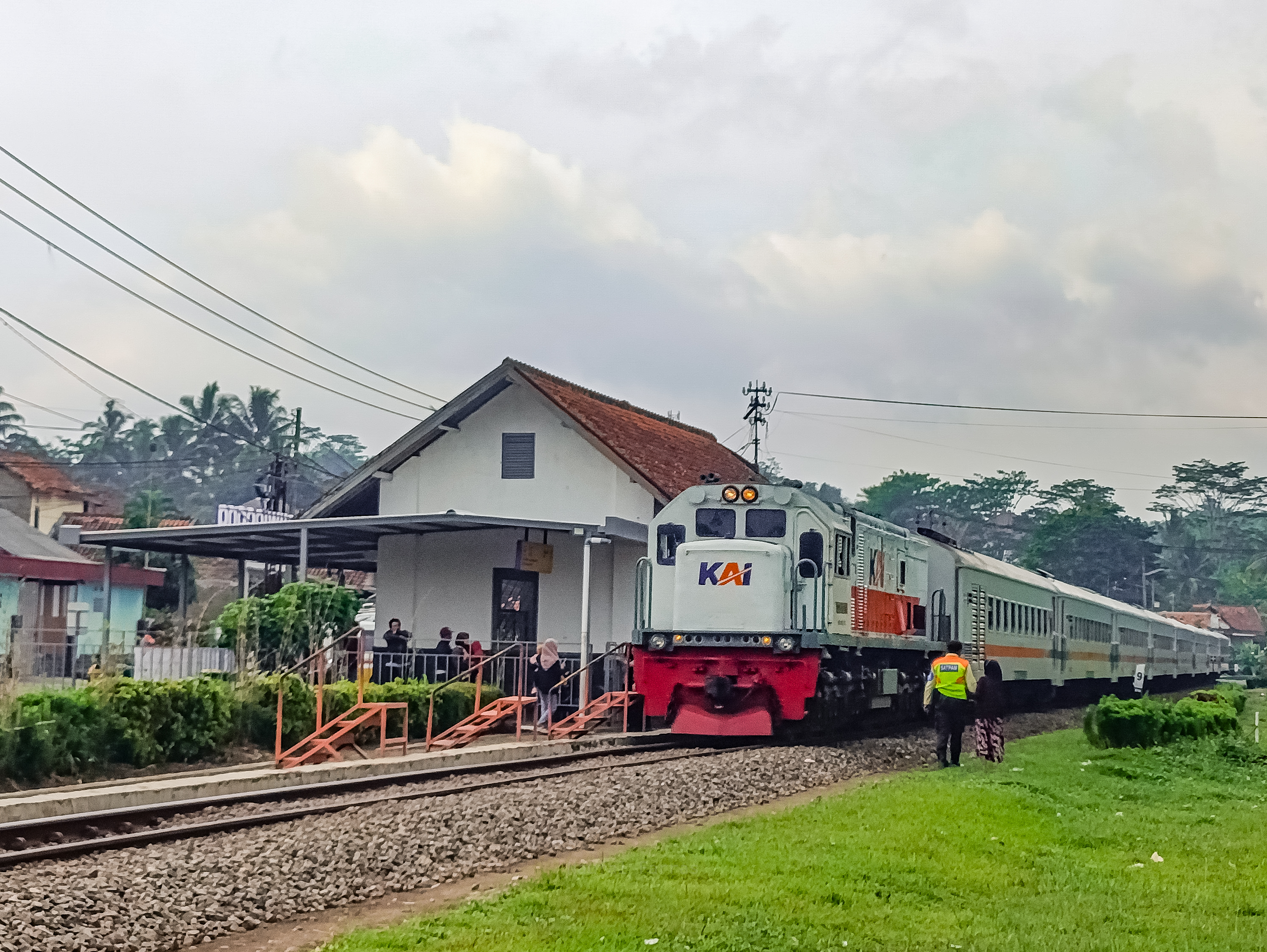
- Garut Commuter Line was stopping at Leuwigoong, 2025

Overview
- Service type: Commuter rail
- Status: Operational
- Predecessor: Lokal Cibatu (Cibatu Local) (1986)
- First service: 25 March 2022
- Current operator: KAI Commuter

Route
- Termini: Garut; Purwakarta & Padalarang
- Distance travelled: around 100 km (62 mil)
- Train numbers: 351 (Garut–Padalarang); 378, 391 (Padalarang–Cibatu); 386–388 (Purwakarta–Garut)

Technical
- Rolling stock: CC203; CC201
- Track gauge: 1067 mm
- Operating speed: 40–90 km/h (24-55 mph)
Route map
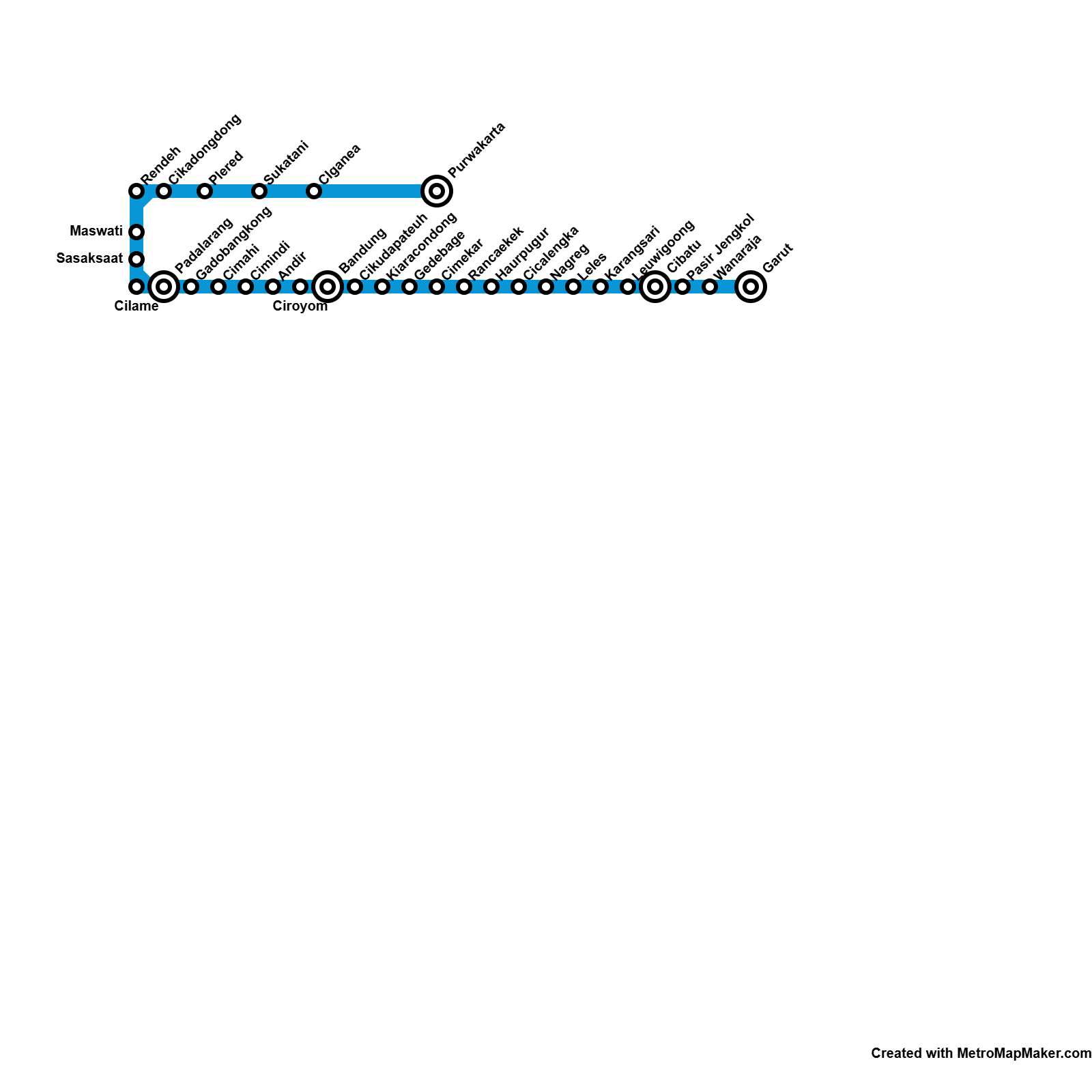

Garut Commuter Line is an commuter rail that operated by KAI Commuter. This train serving between Garut, Padalarang, & Purwakarta that officially operated on 25 March 2022 known as Garut Cibatu Commuter Line, at same time with the Cikuray that route to Pasar Senen as replacing for the Lokal Cibatu since 1986.

== History ==
In 1986, the Garut Commuter Line born that before names as the Simandra train & Lokal Cibatu, then 25 March 2022, Lokal Cibatu changed to the Garut Cibatuan Commuter Line. The Garut Commuter Line crosses rice fields and mountains from Garut to Kiaracondong and from the Padalarang area to Purwakarta. On its journey, this train passes several railway bridges, especially the 2nd longest active bridge, namely Cikubang railway bridge and the highest bridge in Indonesia, namely Cisomang railway bridge, the longest railway bridge between Cilame & Padalarang is the Cibisoro railway bridge, and also a railway tunnel, namely Sasaksaat railway tunnel. Since 1 April 2022, this service has been transferred to KAI Commuter. This aims to streamline KAI services in the local and commuter train segments.

On 1 June 2023 following of the enactment of new train travel chart 2023, the Garut Cibatuan Commuter Line changed to the Garut Commuter Line by the Ministry of Transportation of the Republic of Indonesia.

== List of the Station ==
The every station that passing, the Garut Commuter Line always stopped for passenger serving.

Code Number	Station	Transfer/Notes	Location
LW10 B01 C01	Purwakarta	Terminal station. LW Walahar Commuter Line Greater Bandung Commuter Line Inter-city trains	Purwakarta Regency
B02 C02	Ciganea	Greater Bandung Commuter Line	Purwakarta Regency
B03 C03	Sukatani	Greater Bandung Commuter Line	Purwakarta Regency
B04 C04	Plered	Greater Bandung Commuter Line	Purwakarta Regency
B05 C05	Cikagondong	Greater Bandung Commuter Line	West Bandung Regency
B06 C06	Rendeh	Greater Bandung Commuter Line	West Bandung Regency
B07 C07	Maswati	Greater Bandung Commuter Line	West Bandung Regency
B08 C08	Sasaksaat	Greater Bandung Commuter Line	West Bandung Regency
B09 C09	Cilame	Greater Bandung Commuter Line	West Bandung Regency
B10 C10 KC01	Padalarang	Jakarta–Bandung Whoosh HSR Inter-city trains HSR Feeder Train Greater Bandung Commuter Line Padalarang bus terminal	West Bandung Regency
B11 C11	Gadobangkong	Greater Bandung Commuter Line Trans Metro Pasundan Share taxis (angkot)	West Bandung Regency
B12 C12 KC02	Cimahi	Greater Bandung Commuter Line HSR Feeder Train Inter-city trains Pasar Antri Baru bus terminal	Cimahi
B13 C13	Cimindi	Greater Bandung Commuter Line Share taxis (angkot)	Bandung
B14 C14	Andir	Under construction	Bandung
B15 C15	Ciroyom	Greater Bandung Commuter Line Ciroyom bus terminal	Bandung
B16 C16 KC03	Bandung	Inter-city trains HSR Feeder Train Greater Bandung Commuter Line Trans Metro Pasundan Trans Metro Bandung Trans Bandung Raya	Bandung
B17 C17	Cikudapateuh	Greater Bandung Commuter Line Trans Metro Bandung Trans Bandung Raya Share taxis (angkot)	Bandung
B18 C18	Kiaracondong	Inter-city trains Greater Bandung Commuter Line Share taxis (angkot)	Bandung
B19 C19	Gedebage	Greater Bandung Commuter Line DAMRI shuttle bus service from DAMRI bus pool (at Soekarno–Hatta St.) to Tegalluar Station	Bandung
B20 C20	Cimekar	Greater Bandung Commuter Line	Bandung
B21 C21	Rancaekek	Greater Bandung Commuter Line Share taxis (angkot)	Bandung Regency
B22 C22	Haurpugur	Greater Bandung Commuter Line	Bandung Regency
B23 C23	Cicalengka	Greater Bandung Commuter Line Cicalengka bus terminal	Bandung Regency
C24	Nagreg		Bandung Regency
C26	Leles	Inter-city trains	Garut Regency
C27	Karangsari		Garut Regency
C28	Leuwigoong		Garut Regency
C29	Cibatu	Inter-city trains	Garut Regency
C30	Pasirjengkol		Garut Regency
C31	Wanaraja		Garut Regency
C32	Garut	Inter-city trains Terminal station	Garut Regency

== Tariff ==
The price of Garut Commuter Line was Garut vary depending on the travel. Example price of the Garut Commuter Line:

- Garut-Purwakarta: Rp 45.000.00

== See also ==
- Cikuray
- Papandayan
