= Padalarang railway station =

Railway station in Indonesia

Padalarang Station Stasiun Padalarang
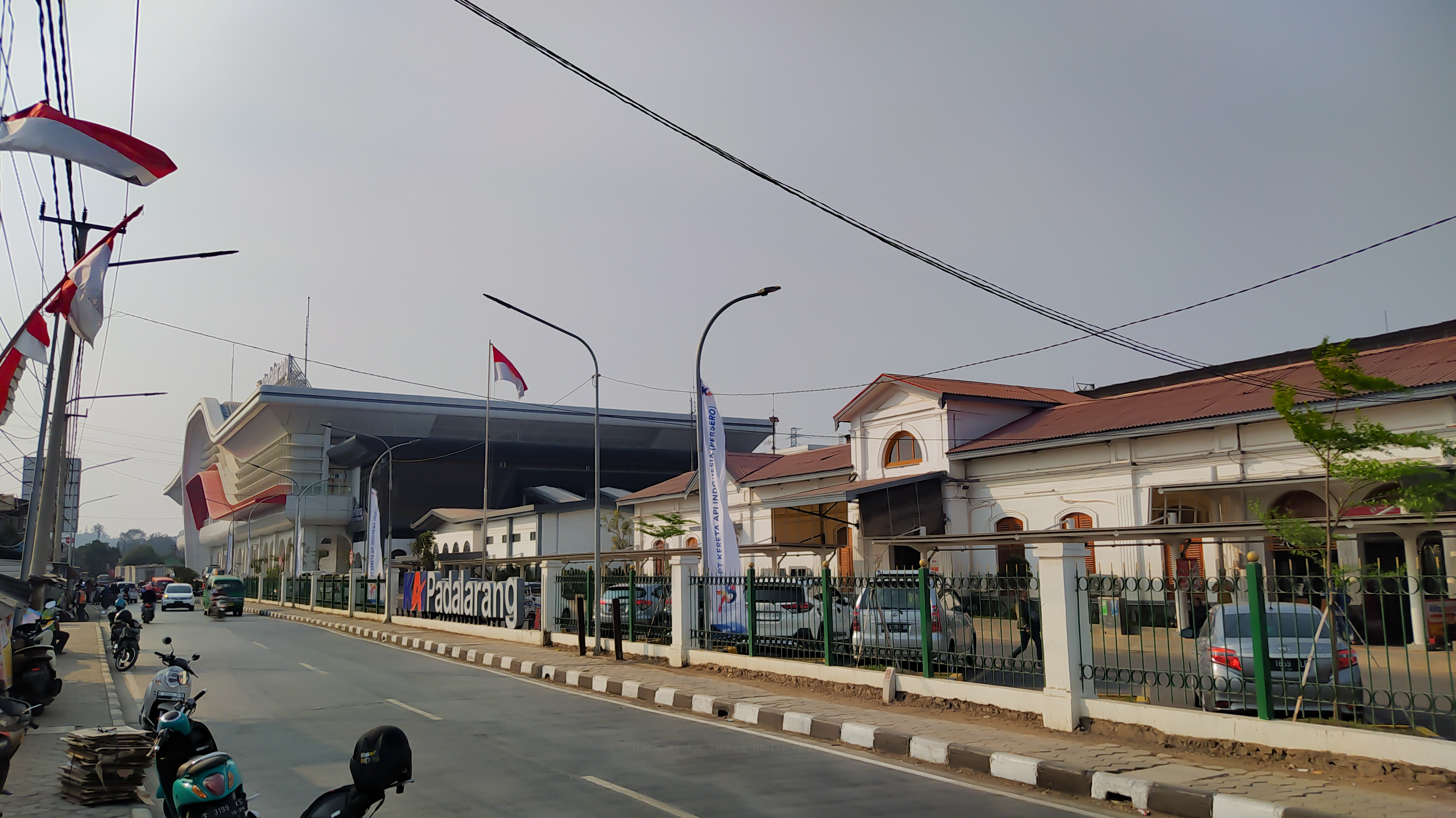
- The original building of Padalarang railway station which serves regular train services (right), with its new large building on the background, which serves the Whoosh high-speed train services

General information
- Location: Padalarang, West Bandung Regency; West Java; Indonesia
- Coordinates: 6°50′34.89″S 107°29′50.38″E
- Elevation: 695 m (2,280 ft)
- System: Inter-city, commuter, and high-speed rail station
- Owner: Kereta Api Indonesia
- Operator: Kereta Api Indonesia; KAI Commuter; Kereta Cepat Indonesia China
- Platforms: KAI; 2 side platforms; 2 island platforms; KCIC (HSR); 2 side platforms
- Tracks: 5; 4 (high-speed rail)
- Connections: Trans Metro Pasundan:

Construction
- Structure type: Ground
- Parking: Available
- Accessible: Available

Other information
- Station code: PDL • 1415
- Classification: Class I

History
- Opened: 17 May 1884
- Electrified: 2023 (high-speed rail only)

Services
Preceding station	KCIC	Following station
Karawang towards Halim	Jakarta–Bandung high-speed railway	Tegalluar Terminus
Location
- Location within Java

Padalarang Station is a railway station complex in Padalarang, West Bandung Regency, West Java, Indonesia. The complex is planned to serve long-distance train services from Kereta Api Indonesia, commuter trains from KAI Commuter, and Jakarta-Bandung high-speed trains from Kereta Cepat Indonesia China (KCIC). The complex is in the form of two different station buildings, each operated by KAI and KCIC, and connected via a pedestrian bridge.

The station is located near the Cihaliwung area and Cihaliwung traditional market, on the heart of the capital city of Western Bandung Regency, the Padalarang town.

The station is located on the western side of Bandung Metropolitan area, it is the junction where two railway routes (Cikampek–Padalarang and Manggarai–Padalarang) merged. It previously had a short branchline that goes into Kertas Padalarang paper mill.

== History ==
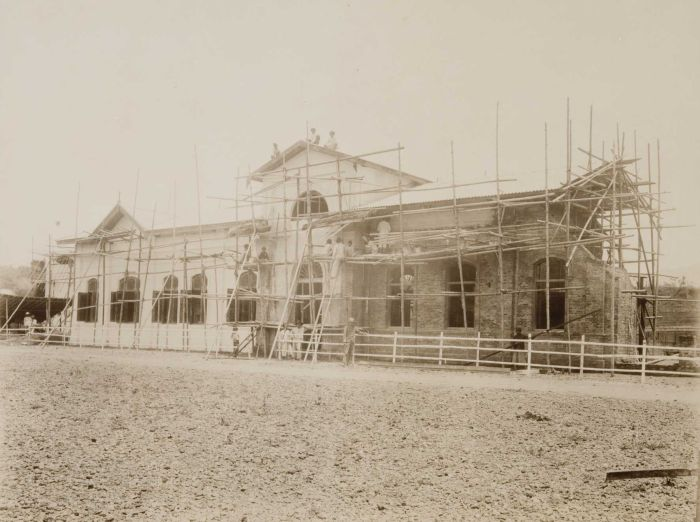
The station under construction (1890-1910)

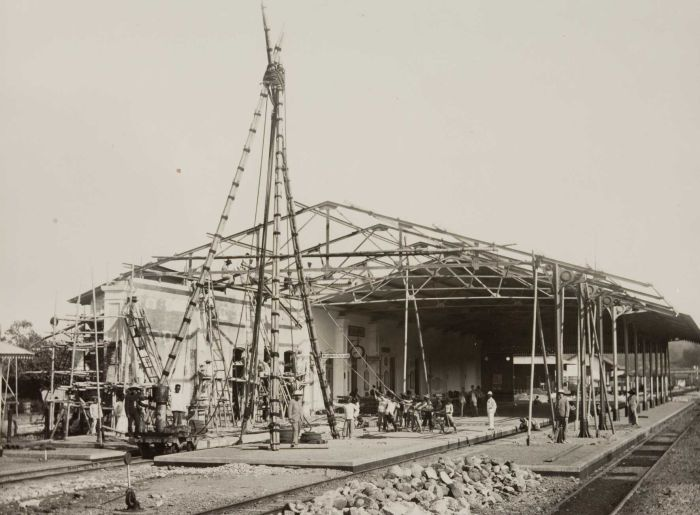
The construction of the roof overcapping of the station

As part of the construction of the Bogor–Padalarang–Bandung–Banjar–Kasugihan–Kutoarjo–Yogyakarta railway line, this station plays an important role in the history of railways. The construction of this station was initiated by the Staatsspoorwegen (SS), a railway company belonging to the Dutch East Indies Colonial Government. This station began to fully operate on 17 May 1884, simultaneously with the opening of the Cianjur–Padalarang–Bandung segment of the railway line.

Initially, this station was a stopover point for trains on the Jakarta-Bandung route via Bogor-Sukabumi-Cianjur. Since the operation of the new Cikampek–Padalarang line in 1906, this station began serving trains from Purwakarta. The operation of trains on this line has proven to be able to cut the Jakarta–Bandung train journey and become the flagship of the SS. This train is also named Vlugge, describing the reliability and toughness of this train to challenge the steep terrain on the line. This station is one of the steam locomotive changing points due to the transition of steep, winding terrain with flat terrain on the Padalarang–Bandung segment. Another locomotive changing point is also at Purwakarta Station.

During the Japanese invasion of the Dutch East Indies, on 7 March 1942, at 18.00, this station was bombed by the Japanese so that trains could not pass. One of the Dutch named J.C. Bijkerk said in his story that as soon as the route was bombed, the distribution of food to Padalarang for residents and KNIL (Royal Netherlands East Indies Army) soldiers were disrupted.

There are several stories that are perhaps rarely discussed about this station, such as the route to the Padalarang Paper Factory. Previously, this station was believed to have been used as a stopover for trains transporting straw as a material for making Indonesian banknotes at that time.

== Building and layout ==
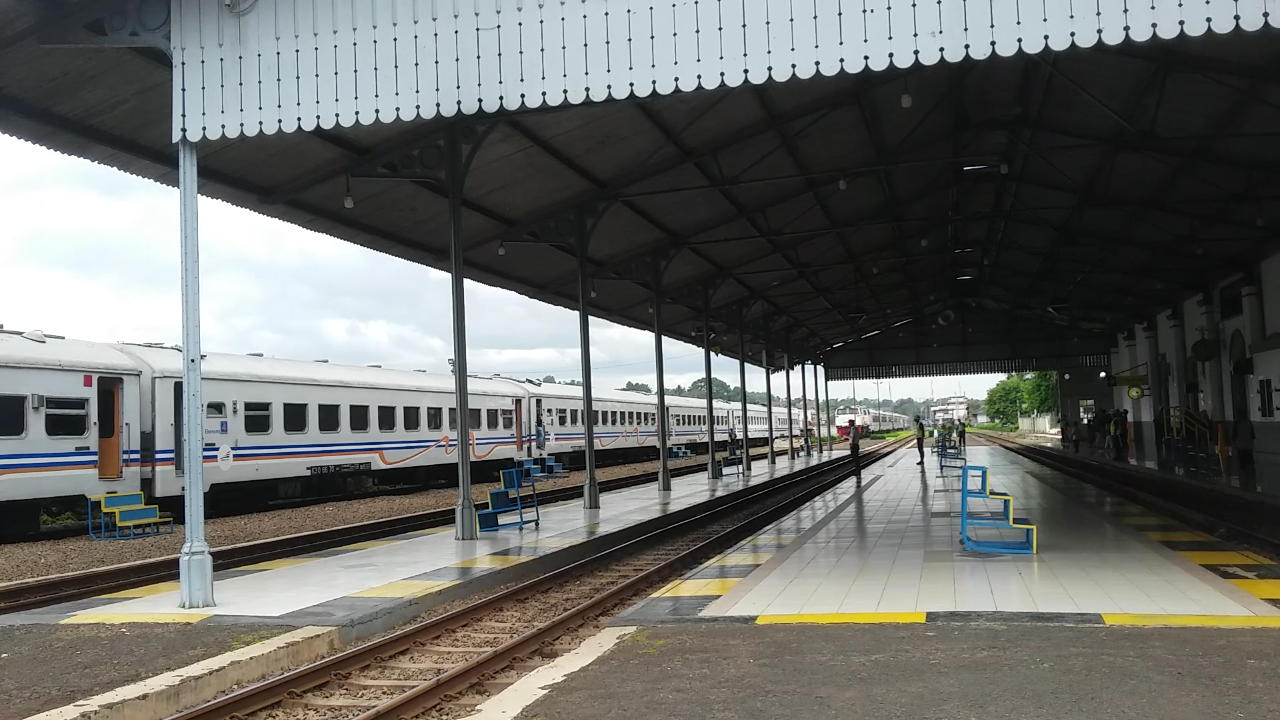
The platform of the station

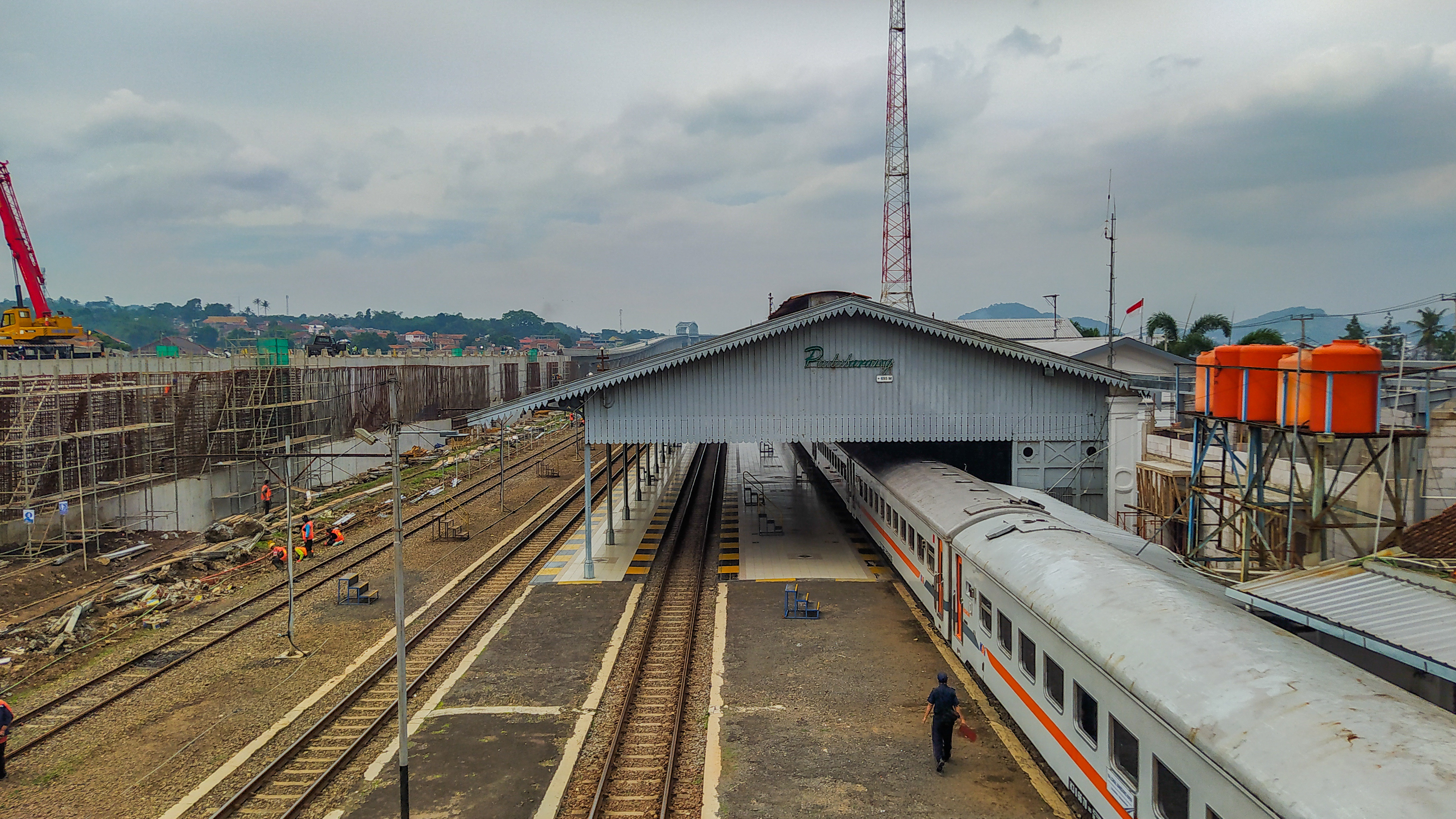
The original station roof overcapping

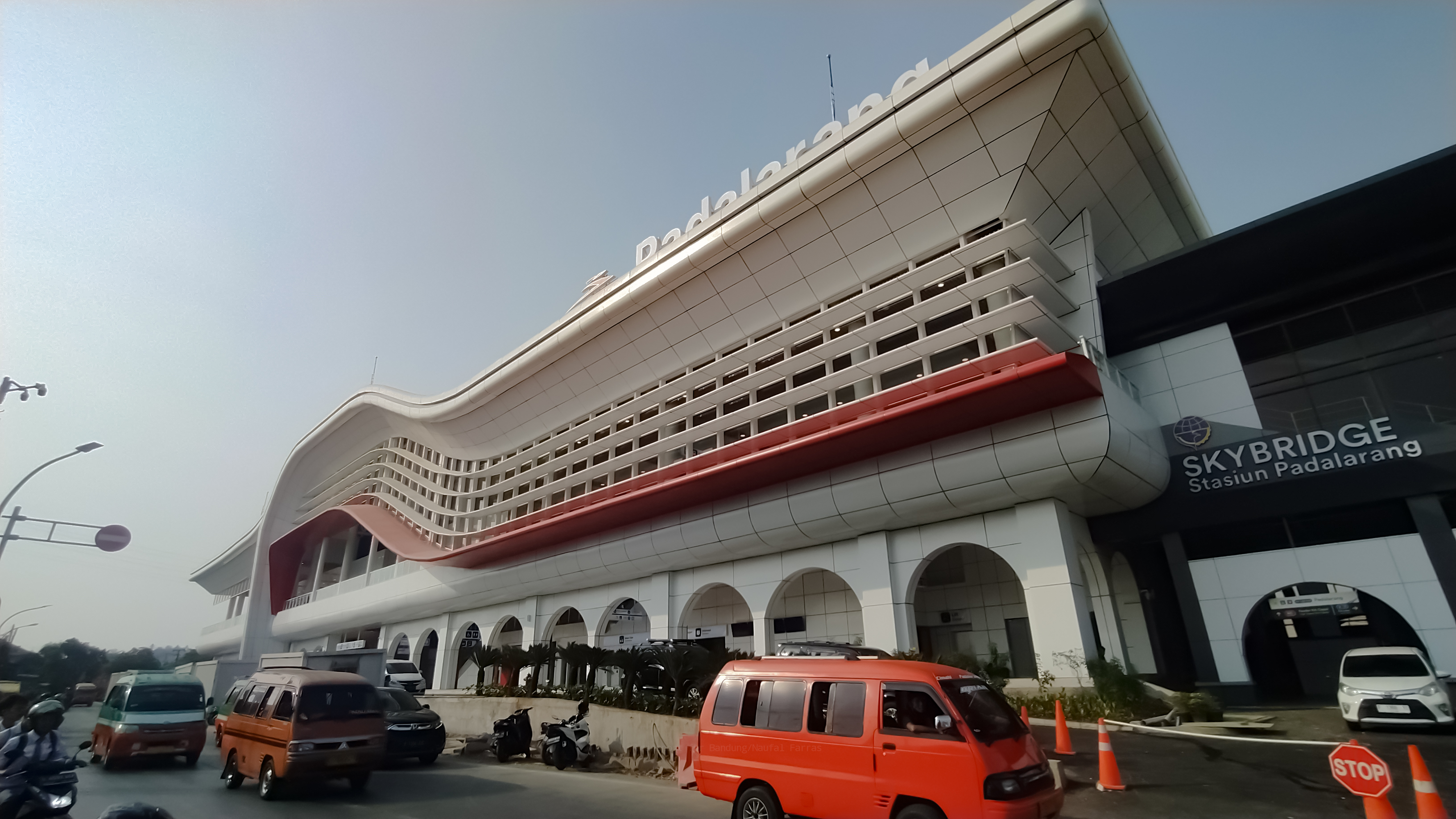
The Padalarang HSR station building which is built next to the existing Padalarang station

This station has five railway lines with lines 2 and 3 being straight tracks and line 5 having ballast loading and unloading facilities. The section of the path leading to Cilame Station is still a single track, while the section of the path leading to the Gadobangkong Station is a double track.

Currently this station only serves train trips in the direction of Purwakarta–Cikampek and in the direction of Bandung–Banjar. To the west of the station the line forks. Although both are all heading towards Jakarta, the routes differ between the two routes. The path that turns to the right is the route to Purwakarta, while the path that turns slightly to the left is the route to Cianjur–Sukabumi–Bogor.

The route to Cianjur used to serve the Cianjuran train to fill the slot for the Bandung–Bogor route. However, this train service was discontinued in 2013 due to the availability of spare parts for hydraulic diesel locomotives which were scarce and old enough to run, as well as the unavailability of public service obligation subsidies from the Government through the Ministry of Transportation of Indonesia. Currently the route to Cianjur is in the process of reactivation, but for now it only goes to Cipatat first.

Since 6 April 1999, the station already uses electric signaling produced by Alstom.

The Padalarang high-speed rail station, built by PT Kereta Cepat Indonesia China (KCIC) stands on the northwest of the station, which was formerly used as a ballast loading yard. Padalarang Station has been expanded to serve passenger transfers between high-speed trains and regular train services.

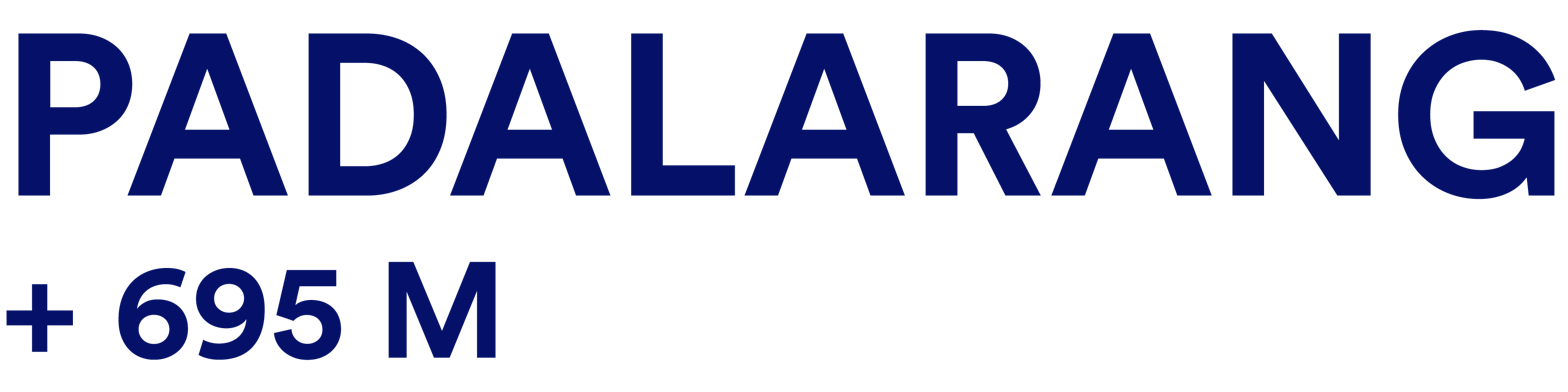
2
Skybridge
1
Side platform
Line 2
← (Karawang)
Jakarta–Bandung HSR stop to Halim

Line X

Straight tracks to Halim

Line X

Straight tracks to Tegalluar Summarecon

Line 1

Jakarta–Bandung HSR stop to Tegalluar Summarecon
(Tegalluar Summarecon) →
Side platform
Main building of HSR station: Ticket gates, security check, ticket vending machines, and retail kiosks
Mezzanine
Skybridge, local/feeder trains ticket gates, and transfer access between local trains and HSR
G
Platform floor
Side platform
Line 5

HSR Feeder Train from and towards Bandung
(Cimahi) →
← (Cilame)
Garut Commuter Line to Purwakarta

Greater Bandung Commuter Line to Purwakarta and Cicalengka

(Gadobangkong) →
Line 4

Straight tracks directly to Bandung and also as turning tracks directly to Cikampek

Island platform
Line 3

Turning tracks directly to Bandung

Garut Commuter Line to Cibatu/Garut

Greater Bandung Commuter Line to Cicalengka

(Gadobangkong) →
Line 2

Straight tracks from and towards Cianjur–Sukabumi–Bogor

Island platform
Line 1

Garut Commuter Line to Cibatu/Garut

Greater Bandung Commuter Line to Cicalengka

(Gadobangkong) →
Side platform
Main building: Entrance and exit, drop-off area, and retail kiosks
Ticket vending machines, HSR/Local/Feeder train customer service/counter, and ticket gates

== Services ==
The following is a list of train services at the Padalarang Station

=== Passenger services ===
==== High-speed railway ====
- Jakarta–Bandung Whoosh HSR, to Halim and Tegalluar

==== Local/commuter economy ====
Train service name	Destination	Notes
Greater Bandung Commuter Line	Padalarang–Cicalengka	–
Greater Bandung Commuter Line	Padalarang–Kiaracondong	Only night schedules with one direction.
Greater Bandung Commuter Line	Cicalengka–Purwakarta	Only night schedules with one direction.
Garut Commuter Line	Padalarang–Cibatu	Trip to Padalarang only operates in the morning, while the opposite direction operates at night
Garut Commuter Line	Garut–Padalarang	Only morning schedules with one direction
Garut Commuter Line	Garut–Purwakarta	Trip to Purwakarta only operates on daytime, while the opposite direction operates in the morning and night
HSR Feeder Train	Padalarang–Bandung	Service is provided for HSR passengers who want to directly travel to downtown Bandung, due to the HSR line does not enter the city area

To ease traffic congestion at the Greater Bandung roads, the Central Government will make Bandung Urban Railway which use electric trains with double tracks line between Padalarang-Cicalengka through Bandung. In November 2011, mapping of Padalarang-Bandung route and feasibility study of Bandung-Cicalengka route have been done by local government.

== Supporting transportation ==
The following is a list of available supporting transportation modes in Padalarang station.

Public transportation type	Route number	Route	Last destination
Trans Metro Pasundan		Kota Baru Parahyangan–Bandung City Square	IKEA Kota Baru Parahyangan
Trans Metro Pasundan		Kota Baru Parahyangan–Bandung City Square	Bandung City Square (Alun-alun Kota Bandung)
Angkot	– (Cimahi)	Bandung Station–Cimahi–Padalarang–Bandung Station Terminal	Bandung Station Bus Terminal
Angkot	– (Cimahi)	Bandung Station–Cimahi–Padalarang–Bandung Station Terminal	Pasar Atas Baru Bus Terminal
Angkot	– (Cimahi)	Leuwi Panjang–Cimahi–Padalarang	Leuwipanjang Terminal
Angkot	– (Cimahi)	Leuwi Panjang–Cimahi–Padalarang	Pasar Atas Baru
Angkot	– (West Bandung Regency)	Cipeundeuy–Cikalongwetan–Padalarang	Rendeh Station
Angkot	– (West Bandung Regency)	Padalarang–Rajamandala	Rajamandala market
Angkot	– (West Bandung Regency)	Padalarang–Gunungbentang	Gunungbentang Bus Terminal
Angkot	– (West Bandung Regency)	Padalarang–Parongpong via Kantor Bupati (Pemda) Bandung Barat	Parongpong Bus Terminal
Intercity bus	–	Padalarang–Purwakarta–Cikampek	Cikampek Bus Terminal
Intercity bus	–	Wanayasa–Padalarang–Ciroyom	Ciroyom Bus Terminal and Wanayasa Bus Terminal

== Gallery ==
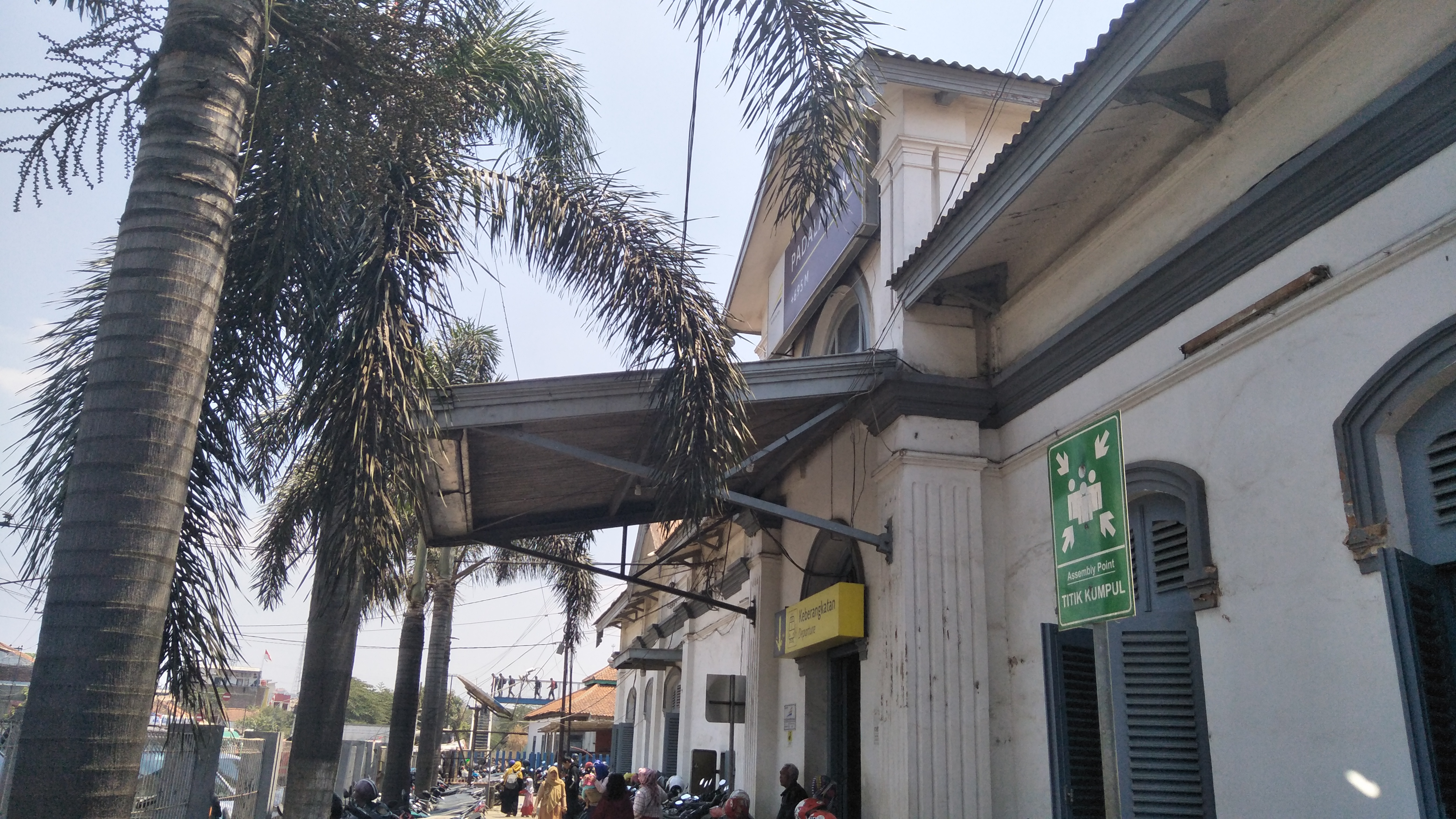
The entrance of the station

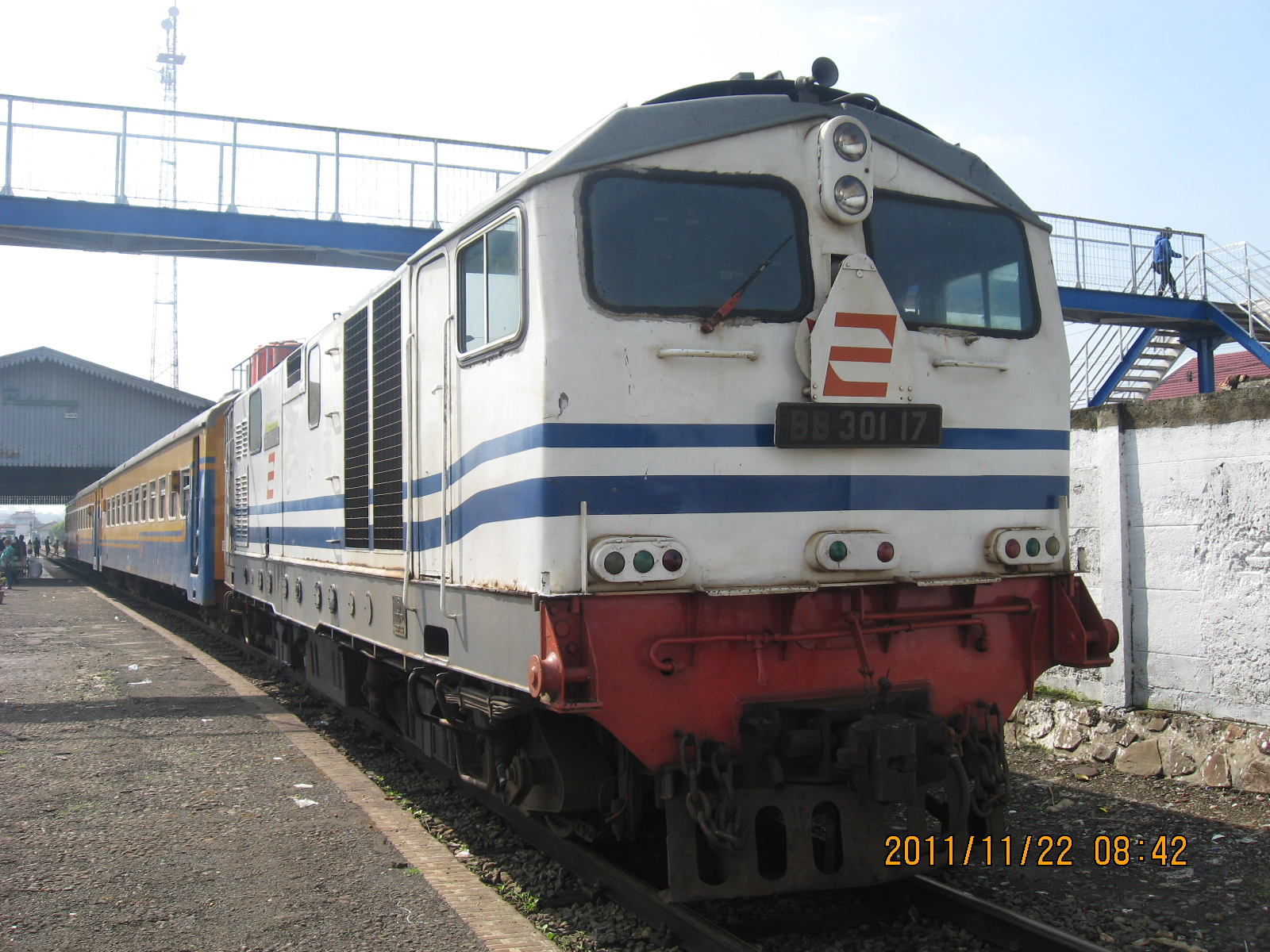
Cianjuran train when it was still operating at Padalarang Station (2011)

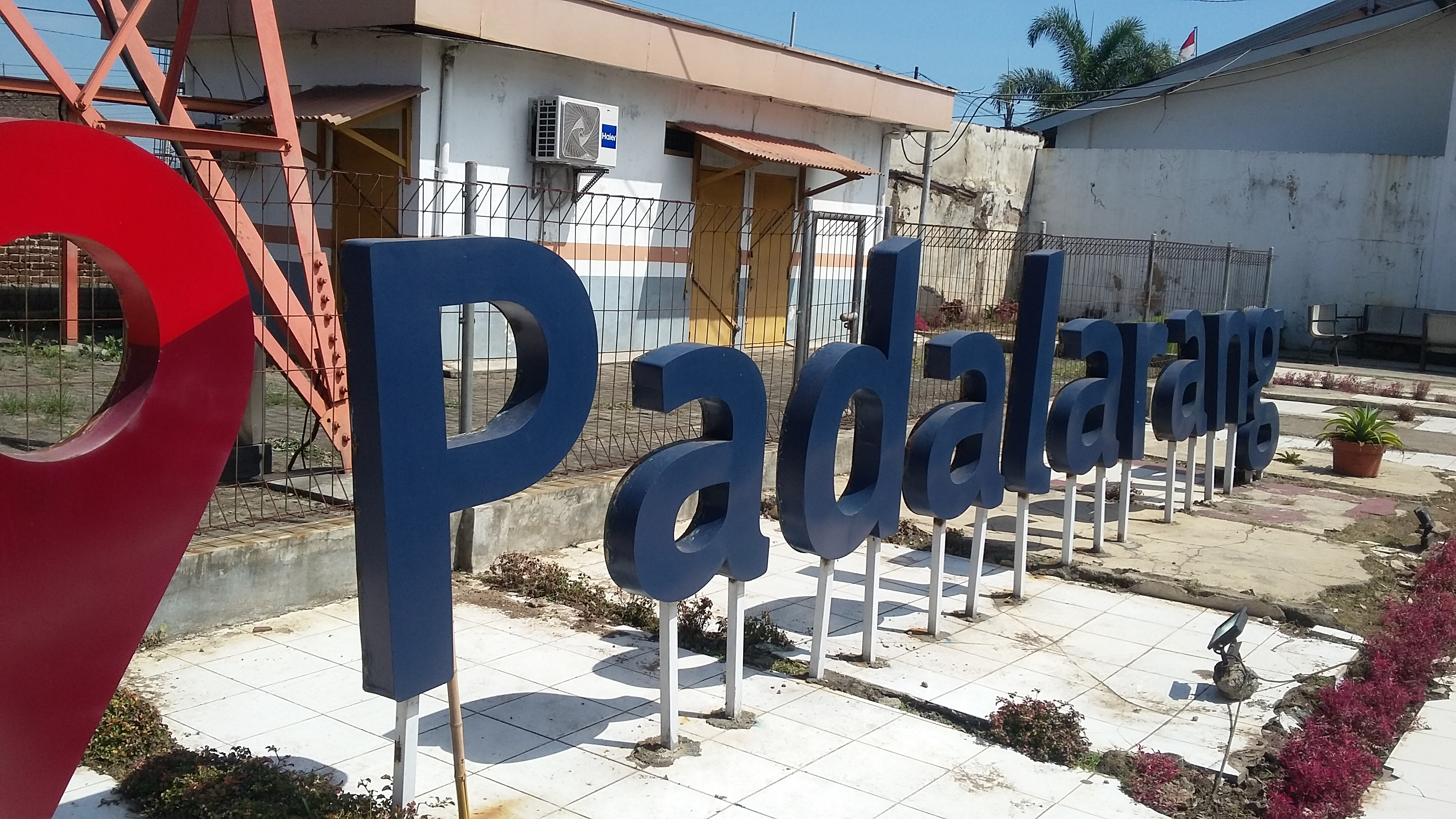
The location marker of the station

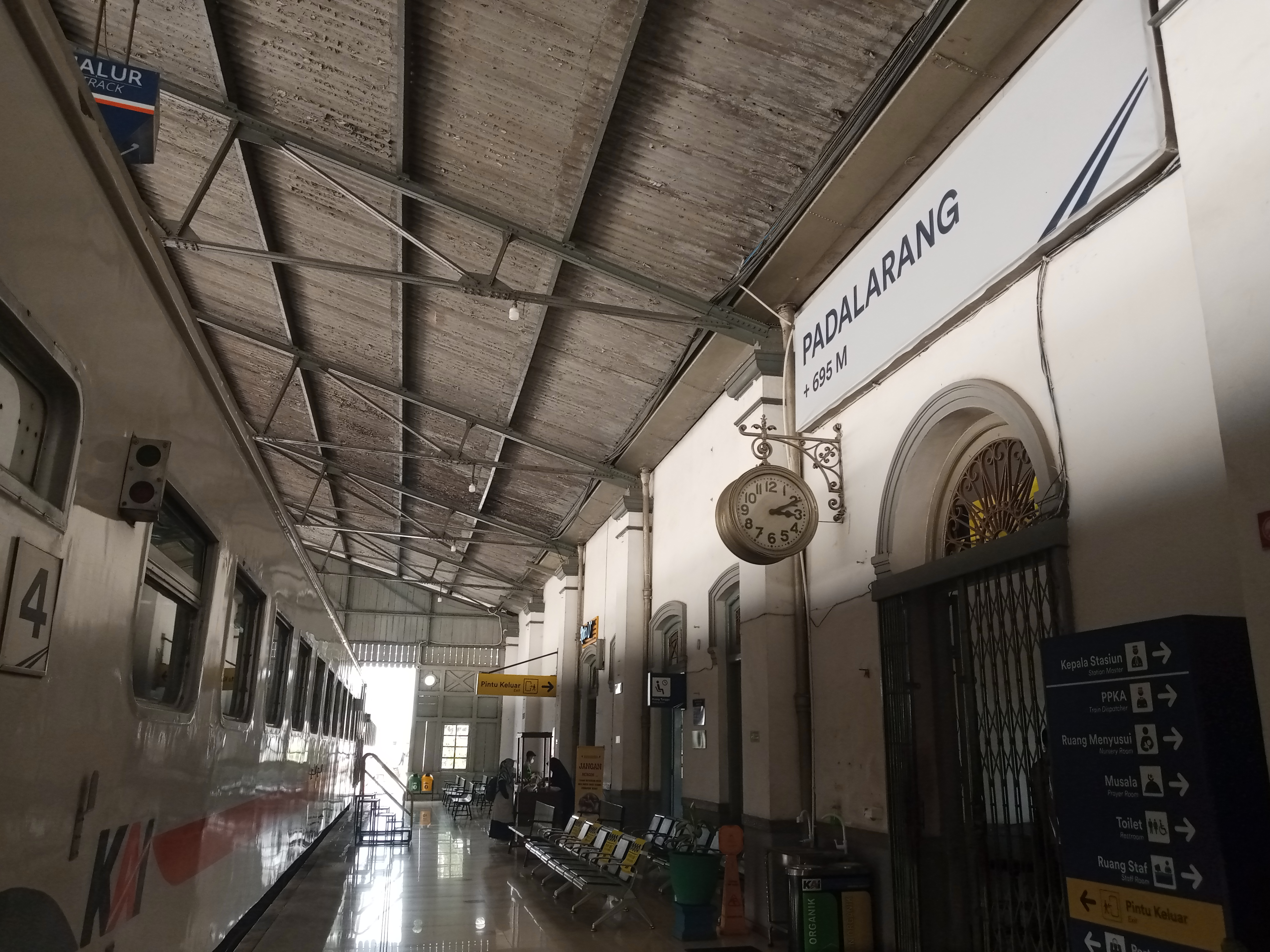
The emplacement of the station

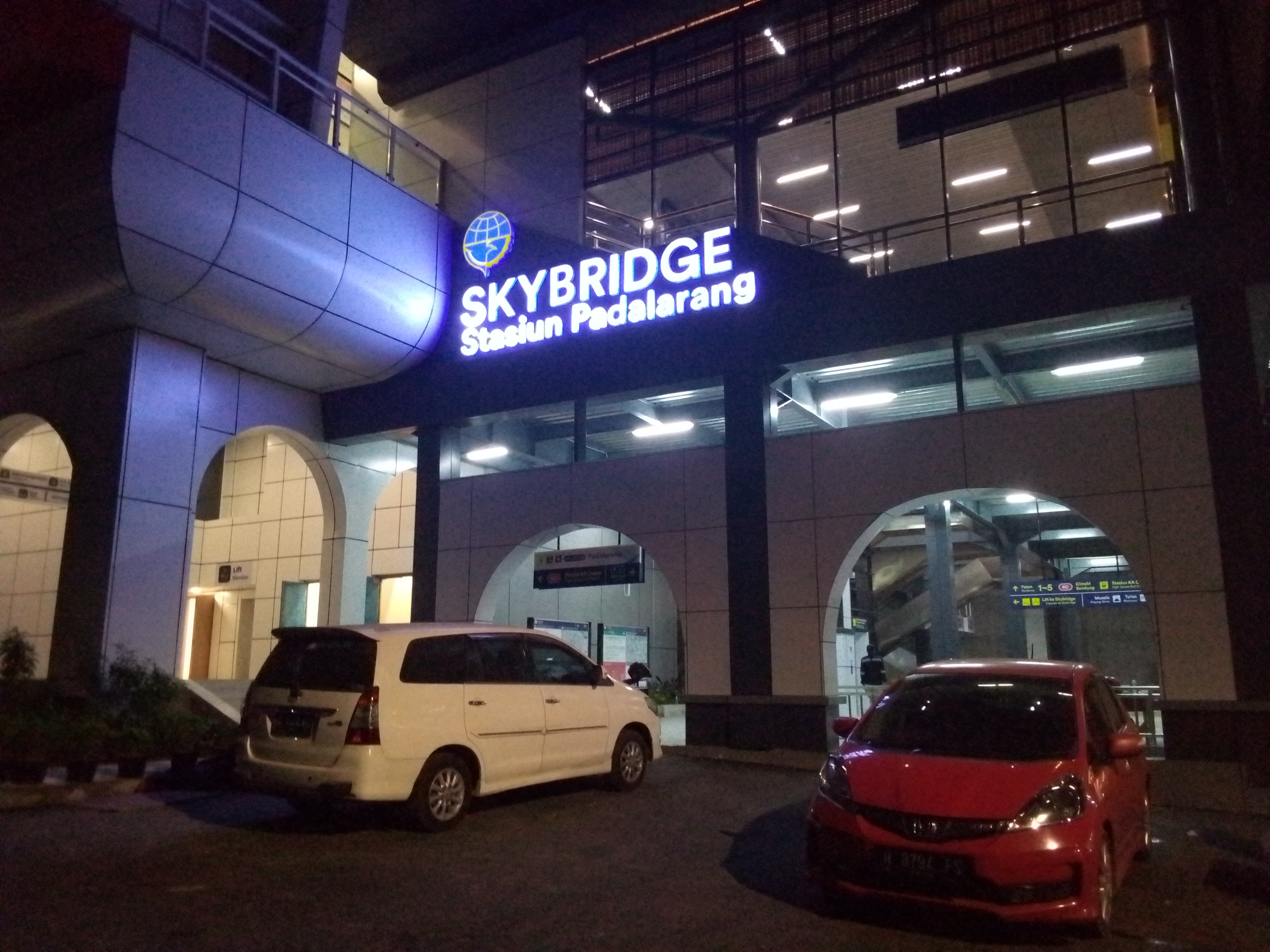
The skybrige that connects between both regular trains and HSR station buildings

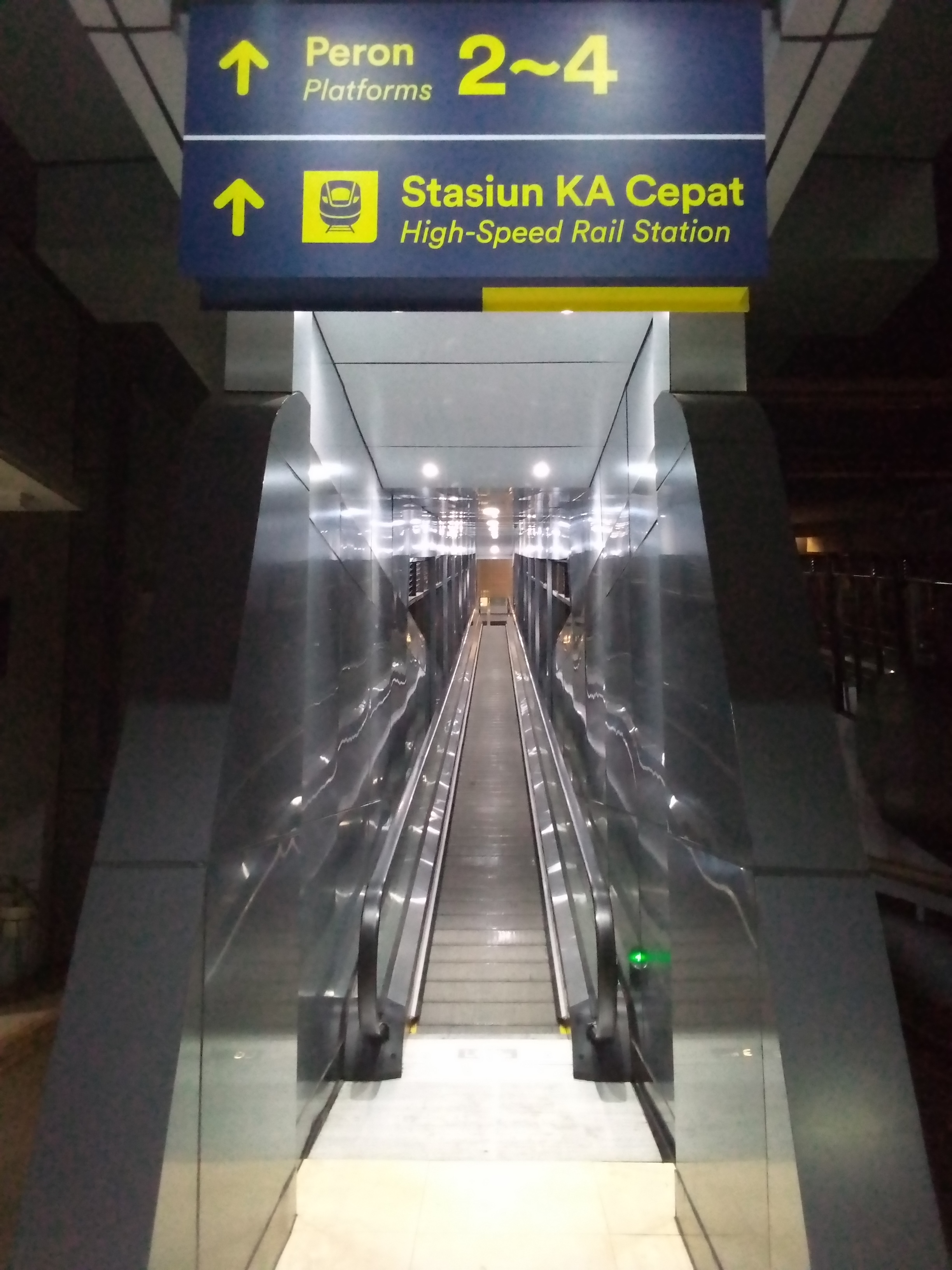
Escalator to the station skybridge

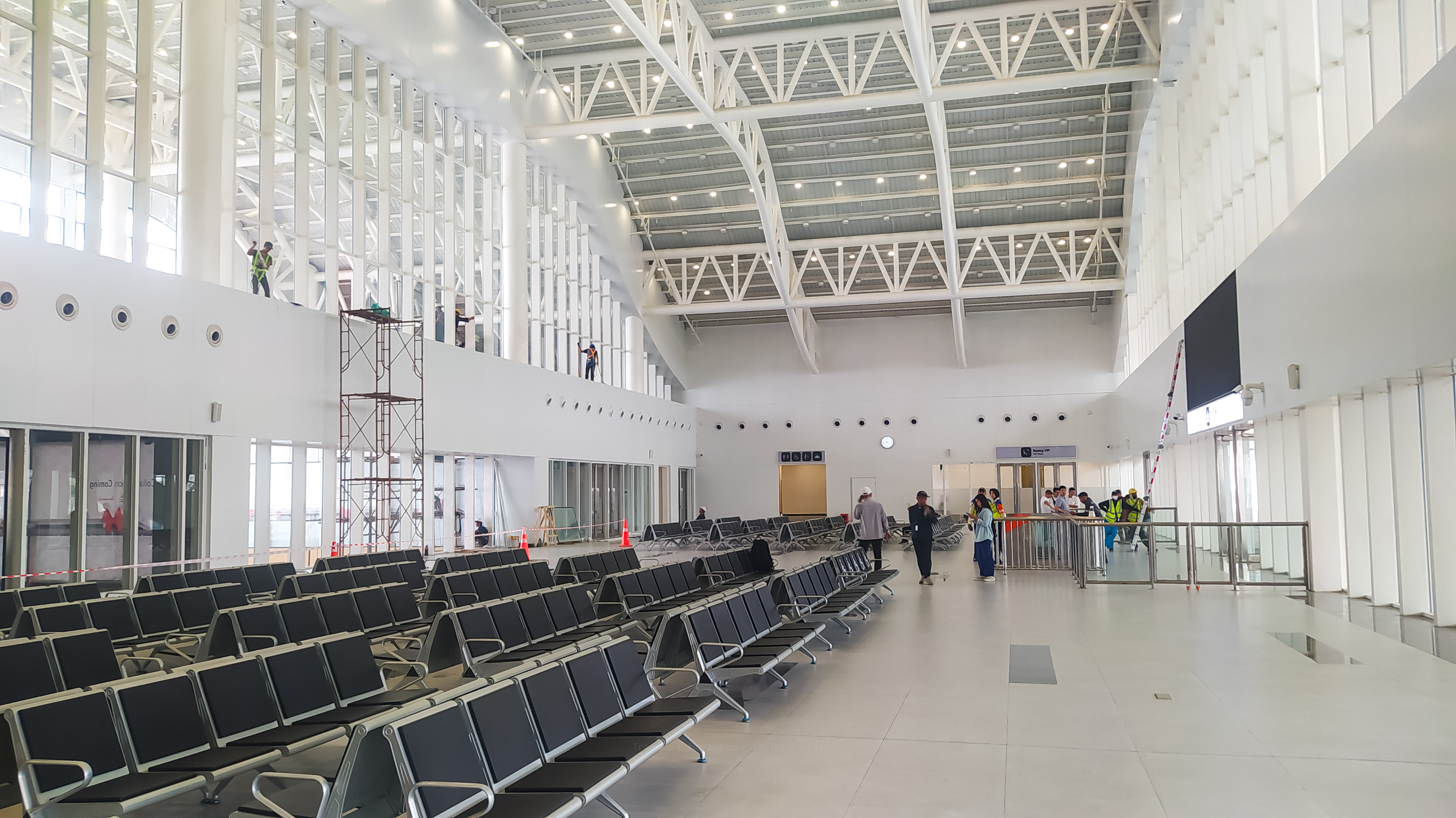
The waiting room of the HSR station

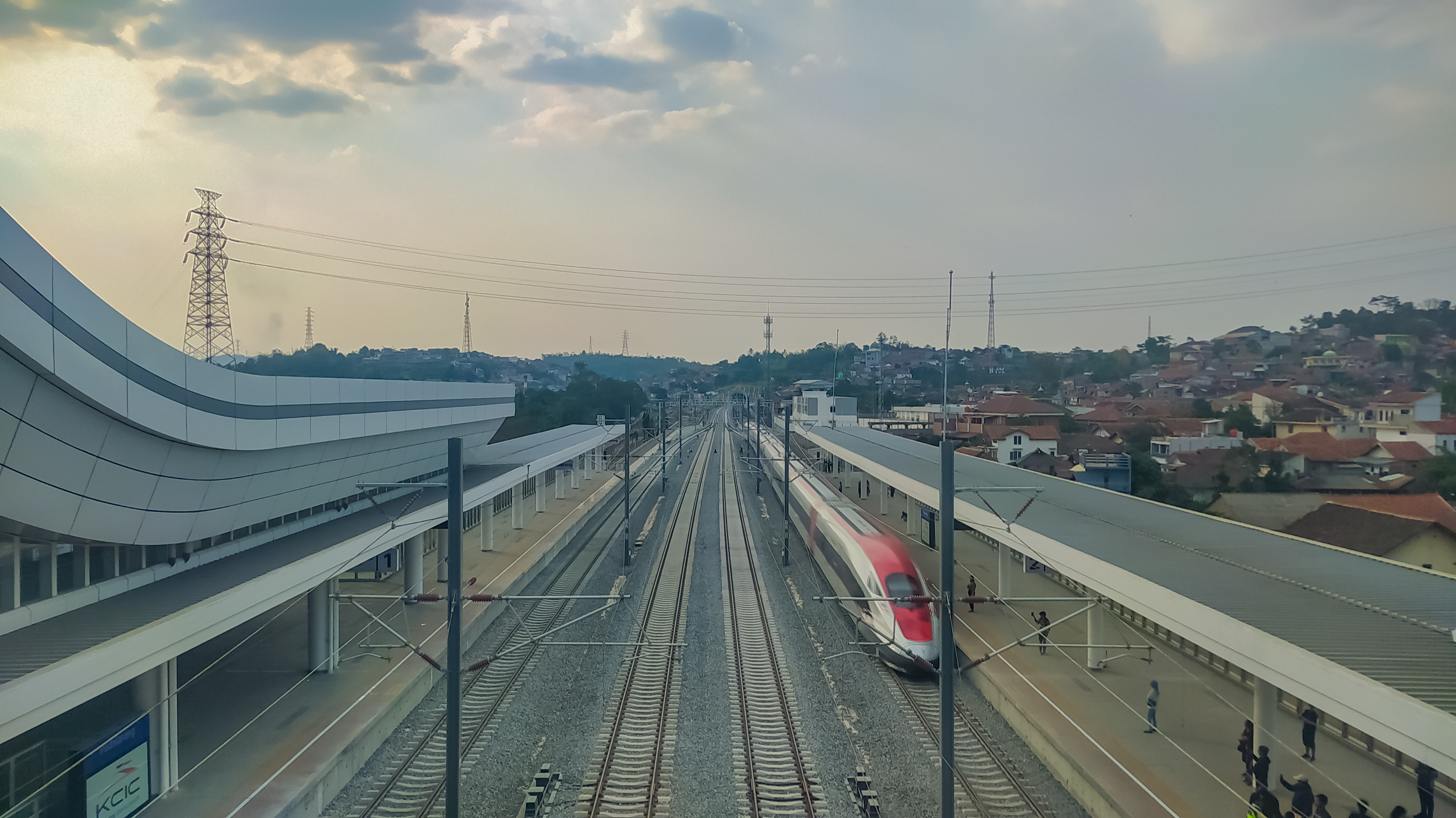
The Whoosh EMU high-speed train departing from Padalarang HSR station

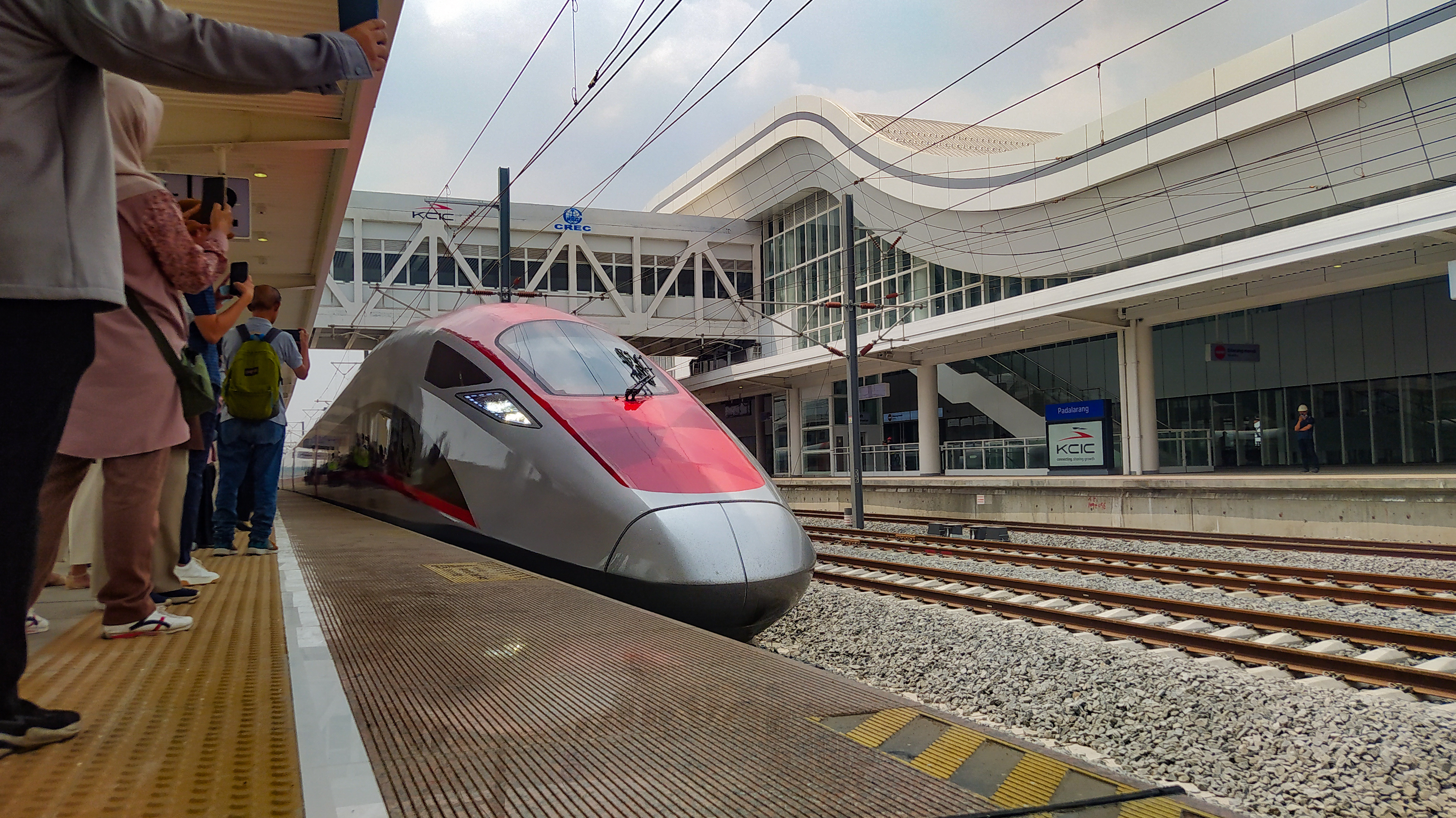
The KCIC400AF EMU of the Whoosh HSR arriving at Padalarang HSR station

Preceding station	Kereta Api Indonesia	Following station
Terminus	Padalarang–Kasugihan	Gadobangkong towards Kasugihan
Cilame towards Cikampek	Cikampek–Padalarang	Terminus
Cilame towards Manggarai	Cipatat–Sasaksaat–Padalarang	Terminus
Tagogapu towards Manggarai	Manggarai–Padalarang	
