= Cicalengka railway station =

Railway station in Indonesia

Cicalengka Station Stasiun Cicalengka
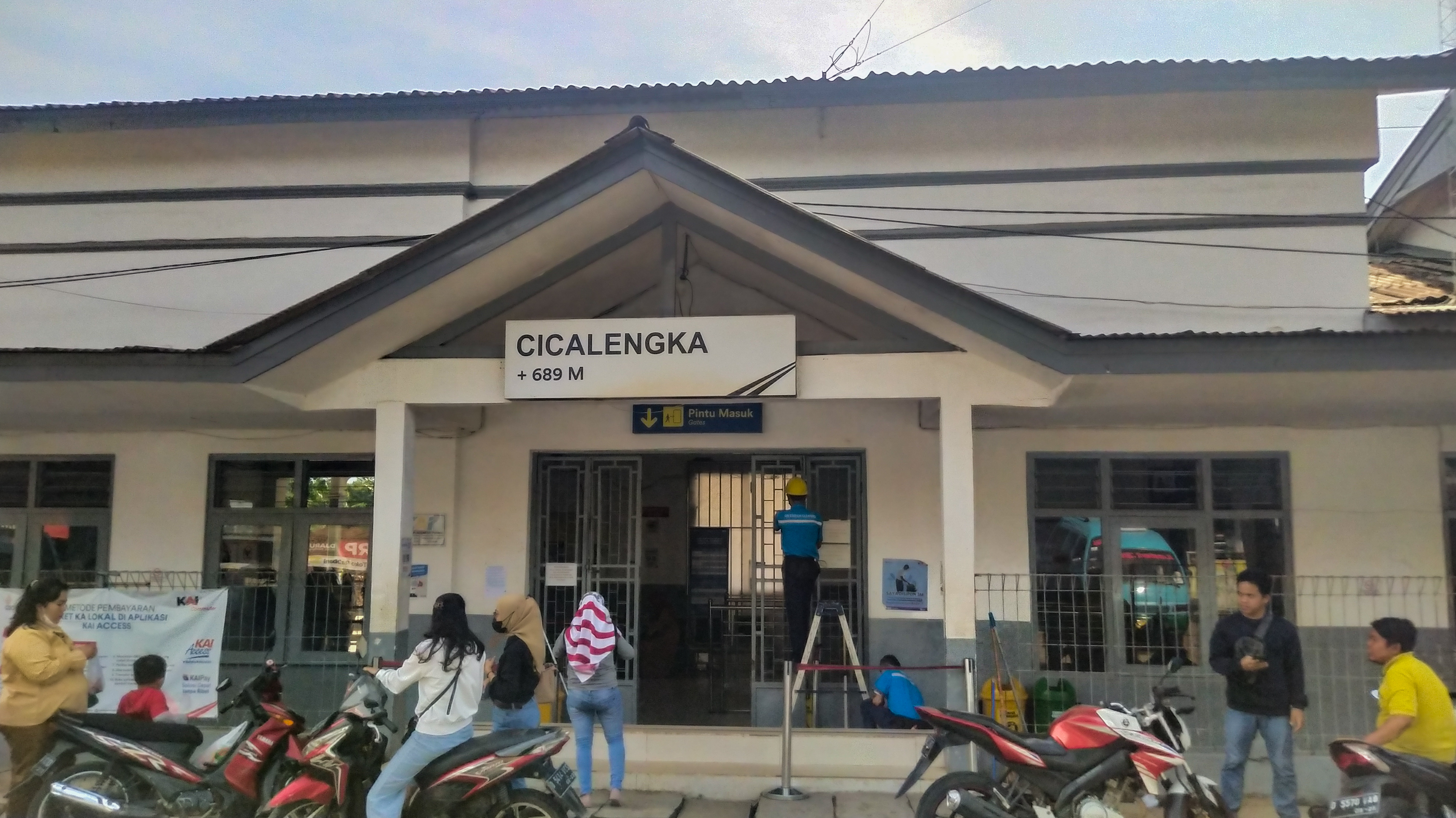
- Cicalengka Station building in 2022

General information
- Location: Jalan Stasiun Cicalengka No. 1, Panenjoan, Cicalengka, Bandung Regency, West Java; Indonesia
- Coordinates: 6.9814°S 107.8330°E
- Elevation: +669 m (2,195 ft)
- Owner: Kereta Api Indonesia
- Operator: Kereta Api Indonesia
- Lines: Greater Bandung Commuter Line; Garut Commuter Line; Padalarang–Kasugihan
- Platforms: 1 side platform 2 island platforms
- Tracks: 3

Construction
- Structure type: Ground
- Parking: Available
- Accessible: Available

Other information
- Station code: CCL • 1605
- Classification: Class I

History
- Opened: 10 September 1884
- Former names: Tjitjalengka Station
Location
- Location within West Java

Cicalengka Station (CCL) is a class I railway station in Cicalengka, Bandung Regency, West Java, Indonesia.

== History ==
Cicalengka Station was opened on 10 September 1884, along with the completion of the fifth fase of the Priangan railway line construction. After that, the state railway company Staatsspoorwegen began to extend the line towards Garut in the east.

In the 1930s, the Dutch colonial government planned to build a branch line from Cicalengka to Majalaya Station to form a loop line orbiting the Priangan region. Construction had started, but due to a monetary crisis and Japanese occupation of the colony, the project had to be cancelled. Currently, only railbed in some spots are still remaining on the line.

== Building and layout ==
The station has three railway lines with line 2 being a straight line and three platforms. The line 1 and 3 is reserved for Greater Bandung Commuter Line, while line 2 is reserved for Garut Commuter Line. The station also has a turntable.

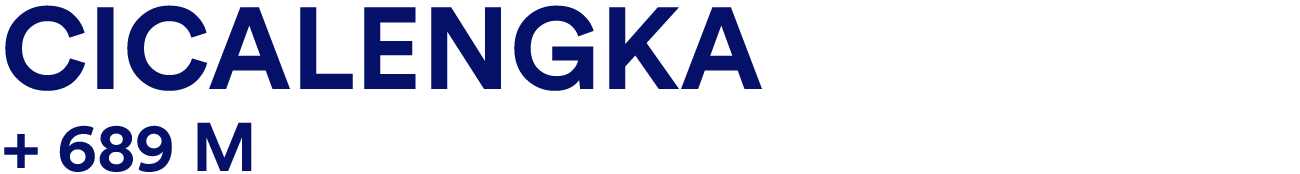
G
Main building
P

Platform level

Side platform
Line 1
←
Turning tracks
→
↔ (Haurpugur)
Greater Bandung Commuter Line, from and towards Padalarang

← (Haurpugur)
Greater Bandung Commuter Line, to Purwakarta
Island platform
Line 2
←
Straight tracks
→
← (Haurpugur)
Garut Commuter Line, to Purwakarta, Padalarang, Cibatu, and Garut
(Nagreg) →
Island platform
Line 3
←
Turning tracks
→
↔ (Haurpugur)
Greater Bandung Commuter Line, from and towards Padalarang

← (Haurpugur)
Greater Bandung Commuter Line, to Purwakarta
Island platform (under construction)

== Services ==
- Commuter trains
  - Greater Bandung Commuter Line to Padalarang and Purwakarta
  - Garut Commuter Line to Garut, Padalarang, and Purwakarta

== Supporting transportation ==
The following is a list of available public transportation at Cicalengka Station

Type	Route	Destination
Bandung Regency Angkot	Cicalengka–Cijolang	Cijolang (Garut)
Bandung Regency Angkot	Cicalengka–Majalaya	Majalaya

== Incidents ==
- On 19 August 2013, the window glass of the waiting room, as well as train dispacther and station master rooms were broken by a mass protest from passengers whom didn't got the Greater Bandung local train ticket due to its sellings were limited. As the result, trains were 30 minutes late from its schedule. At 05:15, the police examine 5 witnesses of the destruction.
- On 5 January 2024, a fatal collision between the Greater Bandung Commuter Line (numbered 350) and Turangga train (numbered PLB 65A) occurred on the plot between Haurpugur and Cicalengka stations. Train traffic in the Bandung–Kroya corridor of the southern Java rail line was distracted.

== Gallery ==
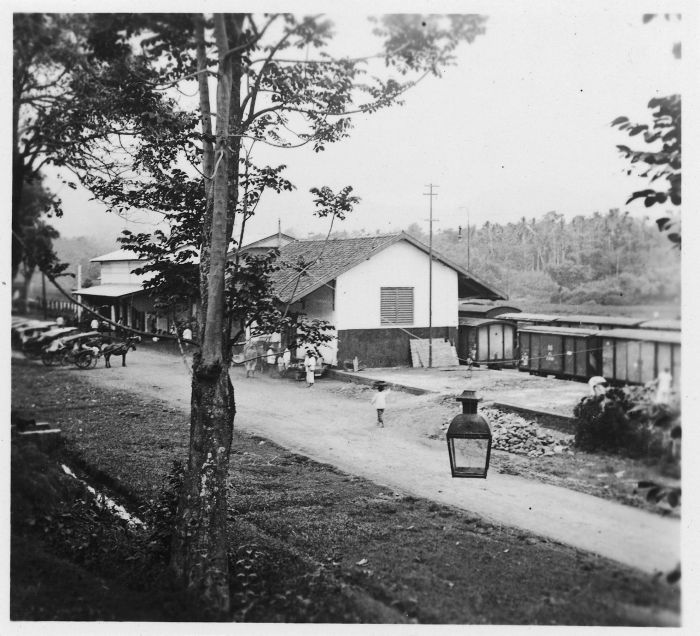
Tjitjalengka (Cicalengka) Station (early 1900s)

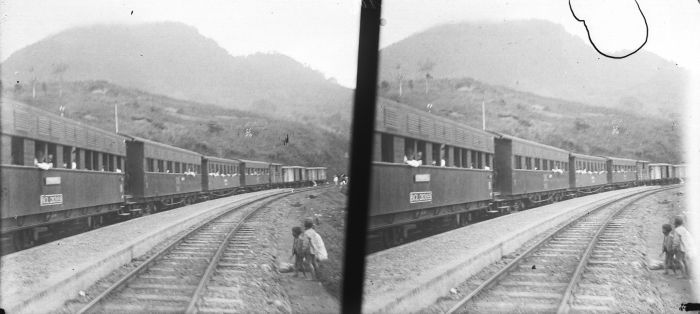
Train passing by the Tjitjalengka (Cicalengka) Station in Preanger Residency (early 20th century)

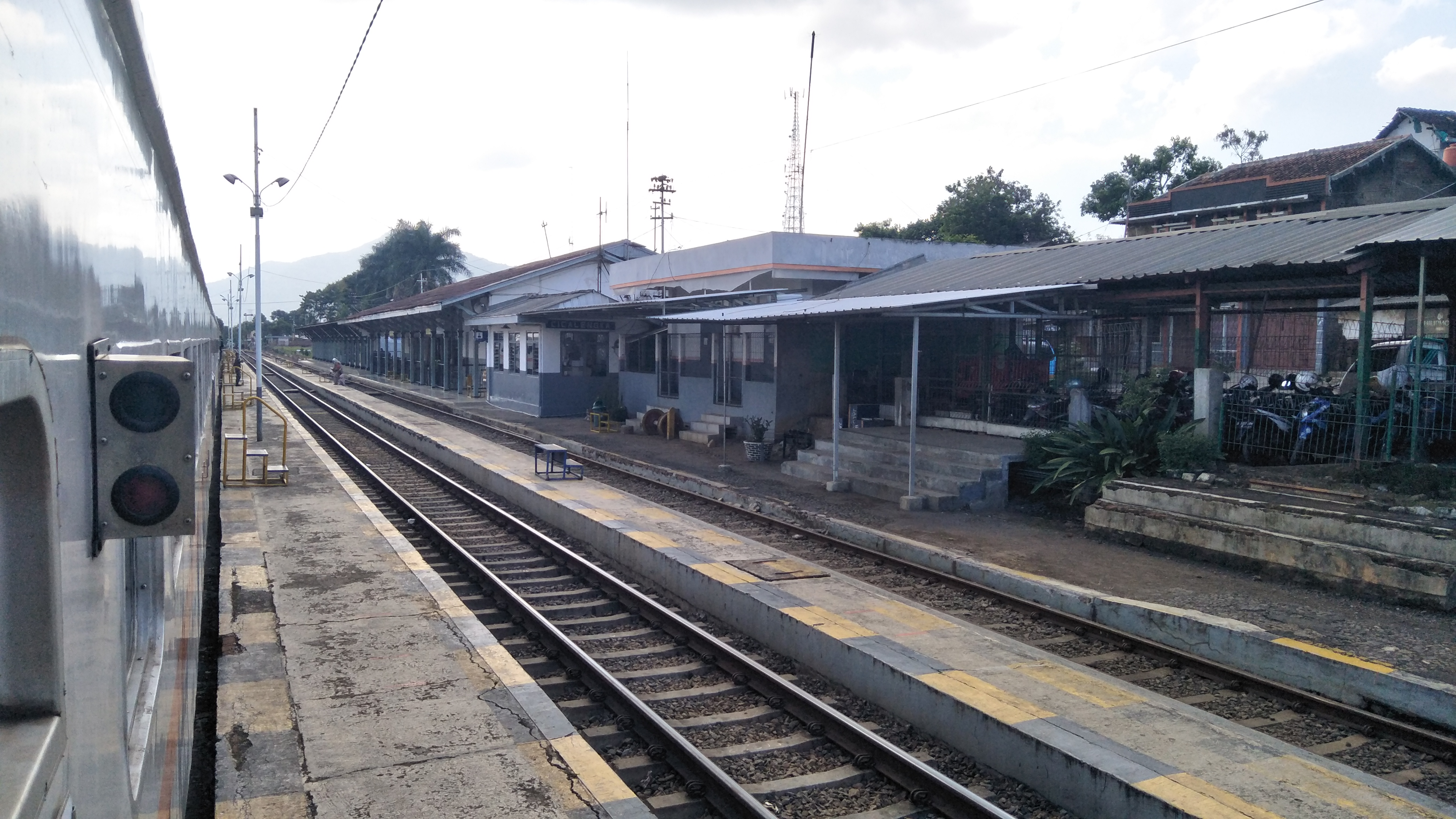
Cicalengka Station platforms

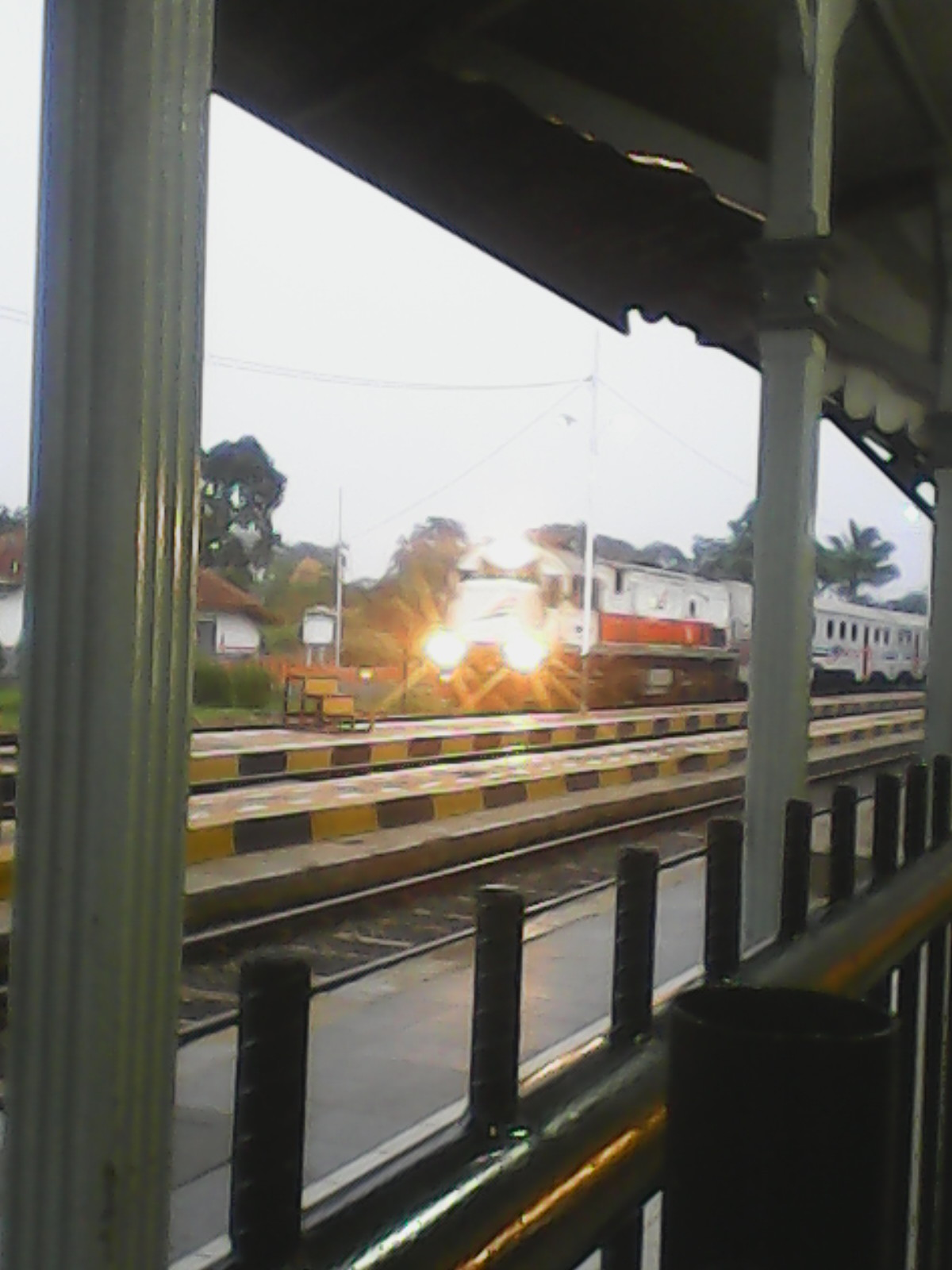
Lokal Bandung Raya arriving at Cicalengka station

Preceding station	Kereta Api Indonesia	Following station
Haurpugur towards Padalarang	Padalarang–Kasugihan	Nagreg towards Kasugihan
