= Metro Jabar Trans =

Bus transport in Greater Bandung, Indonesia

- Logo of Metro Trans Jabar

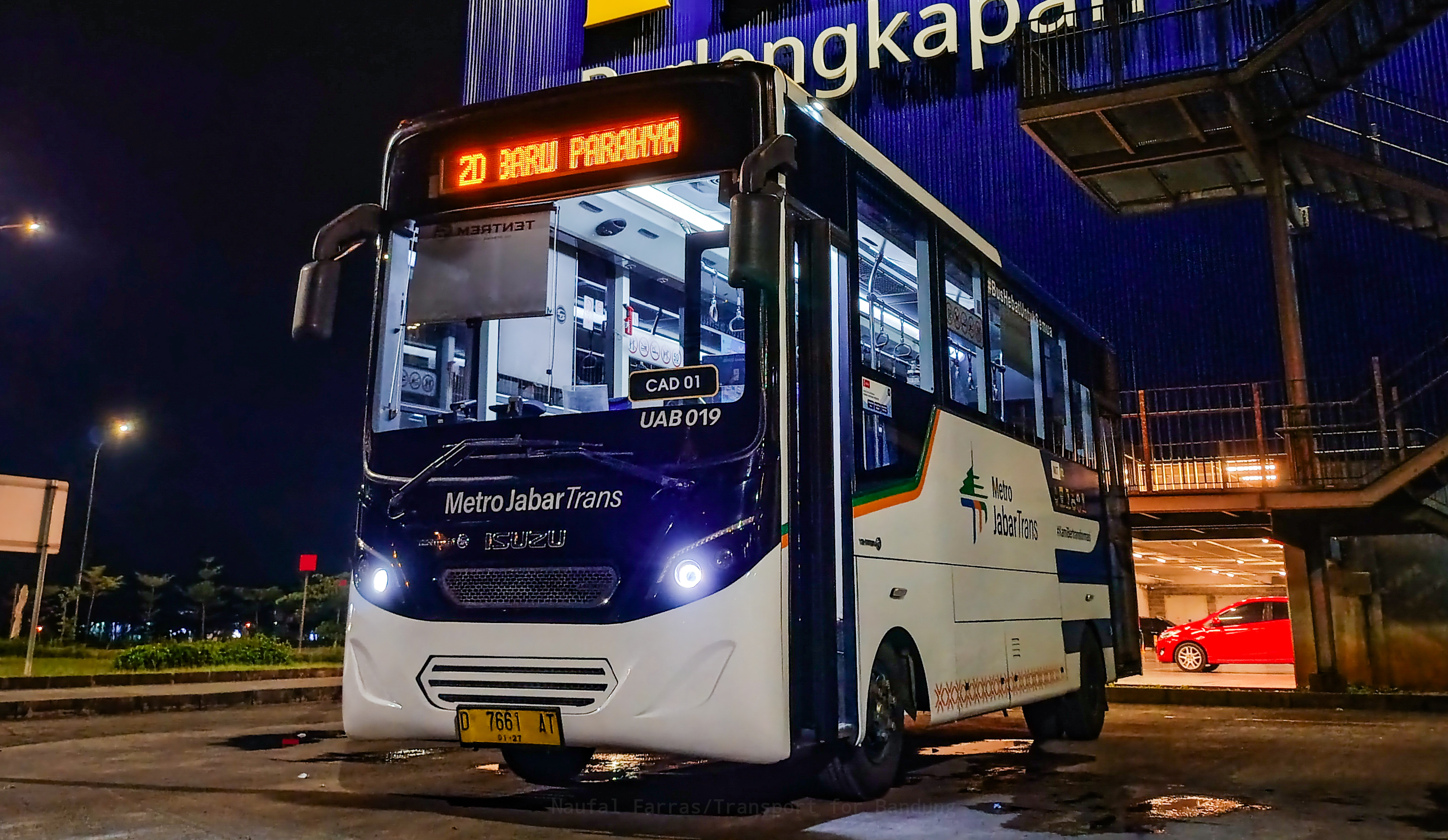
- A Metro Jabar Trans fleet

Overview
- Owner: Government of West Java
- Area served: Greater Bandung
- Locale: Bandung, Indonesia
- Transit type: Bus rapid transit
- Number of lines: 8 Corridors (2 feeder)
- Headquarters: West Java Office of Transportation, Kacapiring, Batununggal, Bandung, Indonesia
- Website: metrojabartrans.com

Operation
- Began operation: 21 December 2021; 4 years ago 1 January 2025; 22 months ago (rebranded)

Metro Jabar Trans, abbreviated MJT or BRT Bandung Raya is a transit bus system in the Bandung, West Java, Indonesia. This service operated by Government of West Java under the Buy-the-Service (BTS) purchasing program initiated by the Directorate General of Land Transportation of the Ministry of Transportation. The system began operation on 21 December 2021, with its inauguration six days later. TMP is operated by the state-owned Perum DAMRI and Big Bird, a subsidiary of Blue Bird Group. On 1 January 2025, Trans Metro Pasundan was rebranded as Metro Jabar Trans.

== Fares ==
Early in its operation, Metro Jabar Trans was free of charge, but passengers were advised to bring an electronic money card and tap it on the card reader device inside the bus (tap on bus).

As of 31 October 2022, in accordance with the Regulation of the Minister of Finance number 138/PMK.02/2022, all bus services on the Teman Bus program began to charge fares. The fare charged for the Greater Bandung area is IDR 4,900 for one trip. Trans Metro Pasundan accepts cashless payments from electronic money cards, digital wallets, or banking apps that support payments with QRIS.

As of 1 July 2023, passengers required to pay the service using electronic money cards, which allows passenger to use the integration fare during transit or changing corridors without having to pay again. This integration fare is valid for 90 minutes. Besides that, the service is free for students and elderly or disabled passengers, provided they register first.

== List of corridors and stops ==
Metro Jabar Trans (formerly Trans Metro Pasundan) route map

Metro Jabar Trans consists of six corridors which serves the Bandung city area and its surroundings. There are two versions regarding the use of the nomenclature code format for each Metro Jabar Trans corridor.

The first version, the MitraDarat application uses the combination code format K-(number)-D, where the first letter K indicates the abbreviation of the word corridor, while the last letter D indicates the license plate code Registration plate for the Bandung area. The second version, the MitraDarat application also uses the code format (number)-D on the realtime map of bus departure schedules, while the last letter D indicates the license plate code Registration plate for the Bandung area.

The following is the list of corridors:

| Type Corridor | No. Corridor | Route | Total Bus stop | Total Bus | Track Length | Operational |
Operational oute
| Main Corridor | 1 | Leuwipanjang — Geo Dipa Energi _{(via Soreang–Pasir Koja Toll Road)} | 18 | 15 | 40.7 km | 04.40—20.30 WIB |
| Main Corridor | 2 | IKEA Kota Baru Parahyangan — Alun-alun Bandung | 37 | 18 | 46.8 km | 04.30—20.00 WIB |
| Main Corridor | 3 | Baleendah — BEC | 56 | 16 | 38.1 km | 04.30—20.00 WIB |
| Main Corridor | 4 | Leuwipanjang — Unpad Dipatiukur | 27 | 7 | 20.9 km | 04.30—20.30 WIB |
| Main Corridor | 5 | Unpad Dipatiukur — Unpad Jatinangor _{(via} _{Padalarang–Cileunyi Toll Road)} | 35 | 21 | 73.3 km | 04.30—20.10 WIB |
| Main Corridor | 6 | Leuwipanjang — Majalaya | 18 | 8 | 58.1 km | 06.00—13.00 WIB |
| Feeder Corridor | FD-1 | Simpang Soetta Kiaracondong — Pasar Baru ABC | 103 | 21 | 31.9 km | 05.00—20.00 WIB |
| Feeder Corridor | FD-2 | Simpang Cicadas Kiaracondong — Plaza Telkom Rajawali | 116 | 21 | 34.4 km | 05.00—20.00 WIB |
Future Route
| Main Corridor | R01 | Cibiru — Kebon Kalapa | TBA | | | |
| Main Corridor | R02 | Kebon Kalapa — Ledeng | TBA | | | |
| Main Corridor | R03A | Leuwipanjang — Dago | TBA | | | |
| Main Corridor | R03B | Leuwipanjang — Dago _{(via Dipatiukur)} | TBA | | | |
| Main Corridor | R04 | Riau — Elang | TBA | | | |
| Main Corridor | R05 | Lanud Husein — Pajajaran — Antapani | TBA | | | |
| Main Corridor | R06 | Cibaduyut — Alun-alun Bandung | TBA | | | |
| Main Corridor | R07 | Padalarang — Alun-alun Bandung | TBA | | | |
| Main Corridor | R08 | Cimahi — Cicaheum | TBA | | | |
| Main Corridor | R09 | Antapani — Ledeng | TBA | | | |
| Main Corridor | R10 | Tegalluar — Leuwipanjang — Elang | TBA | | | |
| Main Corridor | R11 | Tegalluar — Stasiun Hall | TBA | | | |
| Main Corridor | R12 | Leuwipanjang — Soreang | TBA | | | |
| Main Corridor | R13 | Leuwipanjang — Jatinangor | TBA | | | |
| Main Corridor | R14 | Majalaya — Baleendah — Leuwipanjang | TBA | | | |
| Main Corridor | R15 | Banjaran — Baleendah — BEC | TBA | | | |
| Main Corridor | R16 | Sarijadi — Antapani | TBA | | | |
| Main Corridor | R17 | Ledeng — Lembang | TBA | | | |
| Main Corridor | R18 | Jatinangor — Dipatiukur _{(via Tol)} | TBA | | | |
| Main Corridor | R19 | Cicaheum — Sarijadi | TBA | | | |
| Main Corridor | R20 | Majalaya — Derwati — Tegalluar | TBA | | | |
| Feeder Corridor | FD-3 | Soreang — Ciwidey | TBA | | | |

== Gallery ==
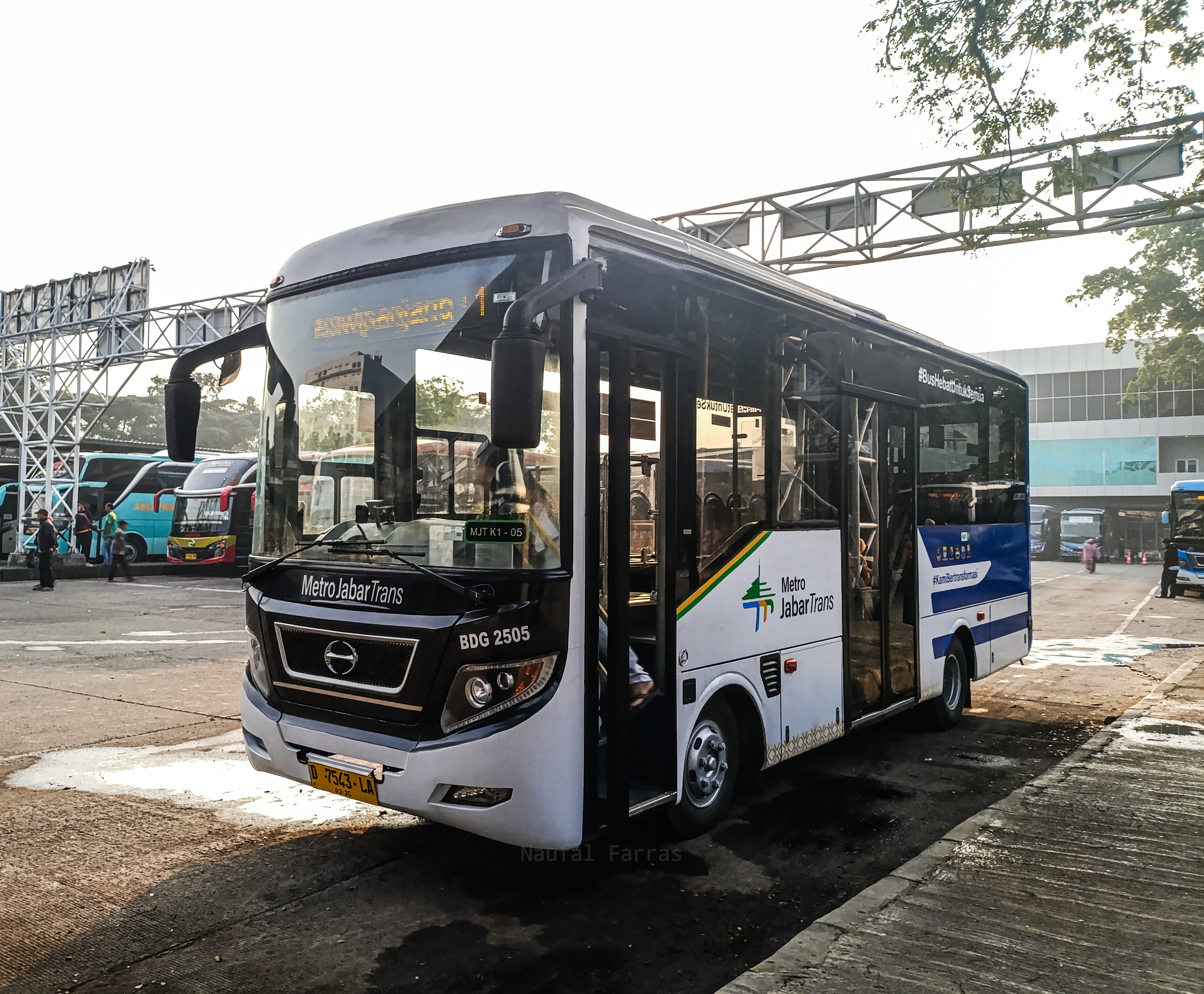
Corridor 1 by Hino FB chassis

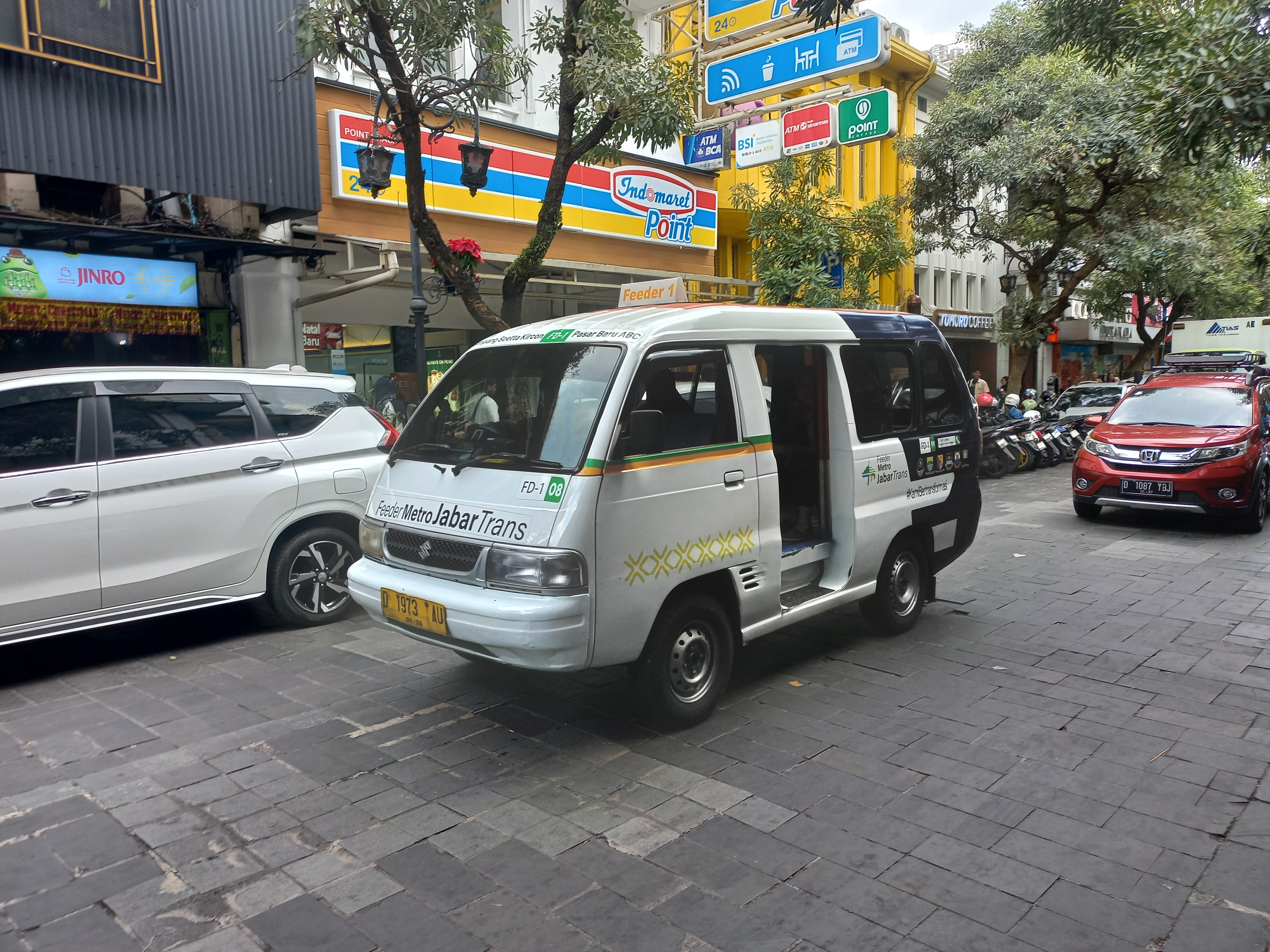
Feeder 1 bt Suzuki Futura

== See also ==
- Transport in Indonesia
