= China Railway CR400AF =

Chinese high-speed train model

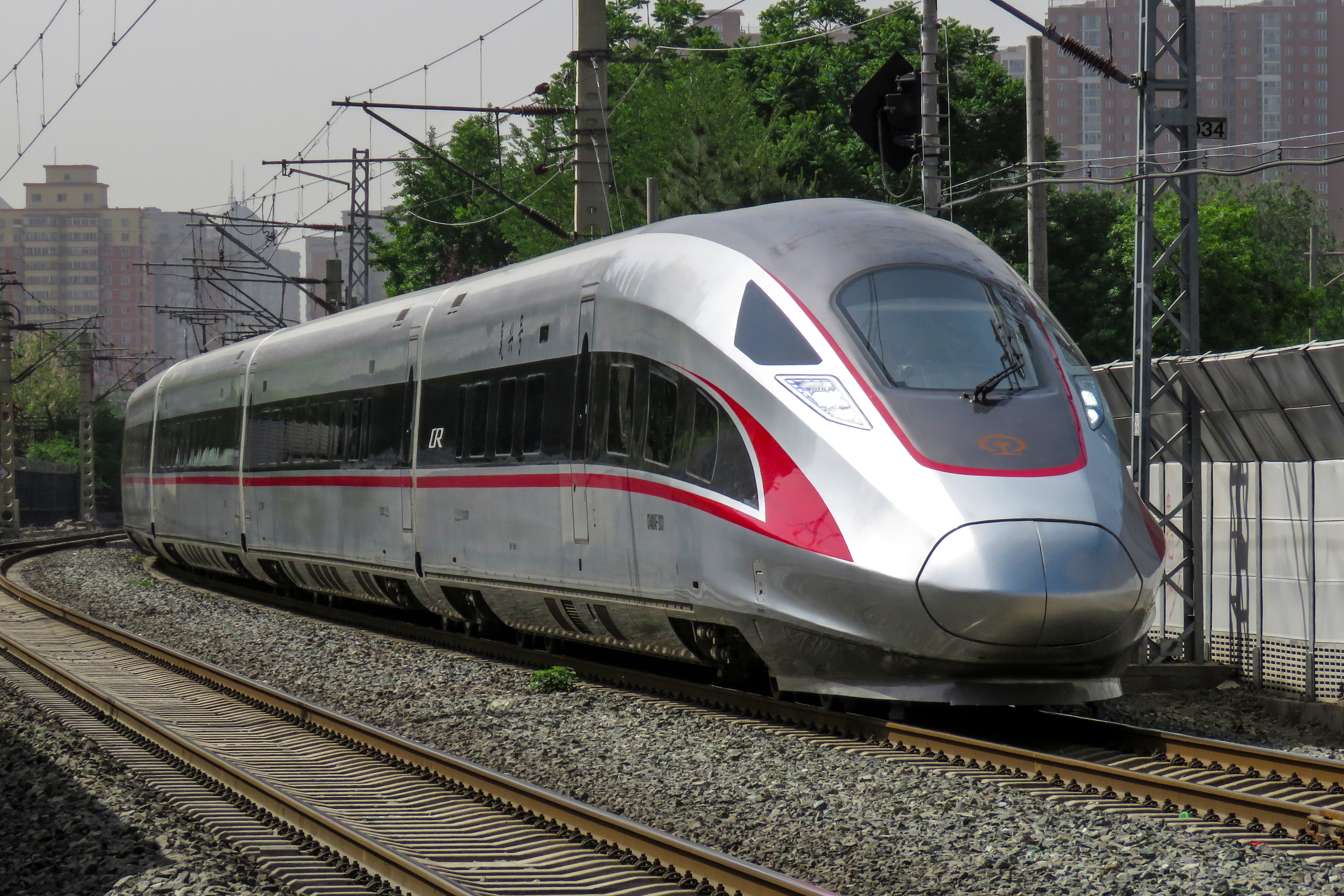
- CR400AF-2031 departing from depot at Shoupakou, Beijing as G66
- Stock type: Electric Multiple Unit (EMU)
- In service: AF: 15 August 2016; AF–A: 16 June 2018; AF–B: 5 January 2019; AF–G: 22 January 2021; AF–Z, AF–BZ: 25 June 2021; AF–C: 15 July 2021; AF–AZ: 1 January 2024; AF–S, AF–BS: 15 June 2024; AF–AE: 30 September 2024; AF–AS: 29 December 2025; KCIC400AF: 17 October 2023
- Manufacturer: CRRC Qingdao Sifang
- Family name: Fuxing
- Replaced: CRH2C, CRH3C, CRH380A, CRH380B
- Formation: AF, AF–C, AF–Z, AF–G, AF–S, KCIC400AF: 8 cars/trainset (4M4T); AF–2808: 12 cars/trainset (6M6T); AF–A, AF–AZ: 16 cars/trainset (8M8T); AF–B, AF–BZ, AF–BS: 17 cars/trainset (8M9T)
- Operators: China Railway Corporation; PT Kereta Cepat Indonesia China

Specifications
- Train length: AF, AF–C, AF–Z, AF–G, AF–S, KCIC400AF: 209 m (685 ft 8 in); AF-2808: 302 m (990 ft 10 in); AF–A, AF–AZ, AF–AS: 414 m (1,358 ft 3 in); AF–B, AF–BZ, AF–BS: 439.8 m (1,442 ft 11 in)
- Width: 3,360 mm (11 ft 0 in)
- Height: 4,050 mm (13 ft 3 in)
- Platform height: 1,250 mm (4 ft 1.2 in)
- Maximum speed: Service: 350 km/h (220 mph); Design: 400 km/h (250 mph); Record: 420 km/h (260 mph)
- Axle load: <17 t (16.7 long tons; 18.7 short tons)
- Traction system: Water cooling IGBT-VVVF inverter control (Zhuzhou CRRC Times Electric)
- Traction motors: YQ-625 external sector 3-phase AC induction motor (Zhuzhou CRRC Times Electric)
- Electric system: 25 kV 50 Hz AC Overhead catenary
- Current collection: Pantograph
- Track gauge: 1,435 mm (4 ft 8 1/2 in) standard gauge

The CR400AF Fuxing (Chinese: 复兴号; pinyin: Fùxīng Hào) is a Chinese electric high-speed train developed by CRRC Changchun Railway Vehicles and manufactured by CRRC Qingdao Sifang. As part of the China Standardized EMU, the CR400AF is designed to operate at a cruise speed of 350 km/h (217 mph) and a maximum speed of 420 km/h (261 mph) in commercial service. Development on the project started in 2012, and the design plan was finished in September 2014. The first EMU rolled off the production line on 30 June 2015. The series received its current designation of Fuxing in June 2017, with the nickname Red Dragon. It is among the world's fastest conventional high-speed trains in regular service, with an operating speed of 350 km/h (217 mph).

An alternate exported version known as the KCIC400AF or Komodo Merah (lit. 'red komodo dragon') or Petir Merah (lit. 'red lightning') is exported for operations in Indonesia on their Jakarta–Bandung high-speed railway.

== Variants ==
All variants of the Fuxing train are compatible. The EMU models share the same standard required by China Railway Corporation, hence the name China Standardized EMU. Fuxing train models can be identified by their designation. The absence of a letter after the dash indicates the standard 8-car configuration. A denotes a 16-car configuration; B denotes a 17-car configuration; C denotes 8-car multiple units with automatic train operation capability; G denotes an 8-car trainset resistant to sandstorms and cold climates; and Z denotes an 8-car configuration with redesigned interior and exterior. Some variants have two letters indicating a combined configuration, such as type GZ, which is a trainset featuring extreme weather resistance (type G) and a redesigned interior and exterior (type Z).

=== CR400AF ===
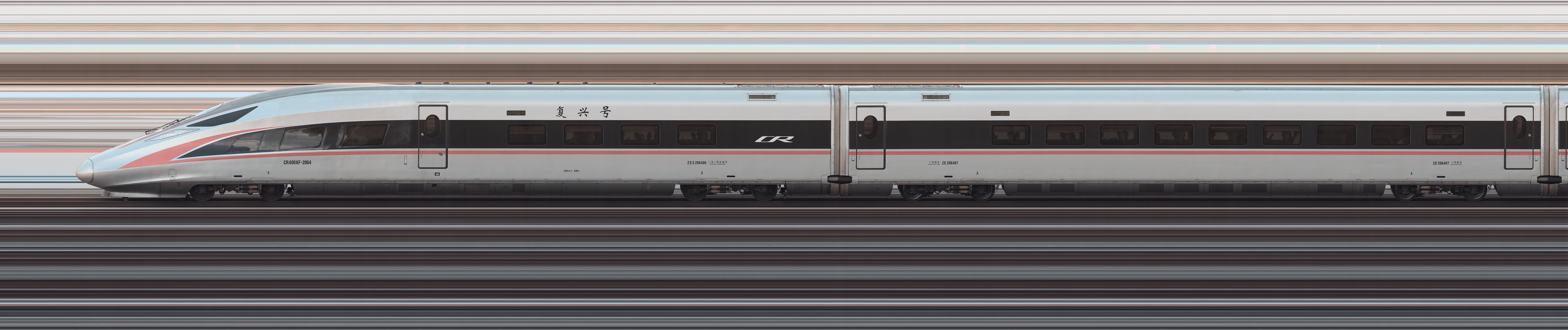
CR400AF

8-car standard production model with standard maximum speed of 420 km/h (261 mph). It is manufactured by CRRC Qingdao Sifang.

=== KCIC400AF/AF-CIT ===
Exported derivative of the CR400AF for Jakarta–Bandung high-speed line.

=== CR400AF–A ===
16-car version manufactured by CRRC Qingdao Sifang. The first CR400AF-A started operation in July 2018 on the Beijing–Shanghai high-speed railway. These sets are 415 m (1,361 ft 7 in) long and have a passenger capacity of 1,193 passengers. 77 sets have been manufactured. This model is no longer produced.

=== CR400AF–B ===
17-car version manufactured by CRRC Qingdao Sifang. Testing started in 2018 and entered passenger service in 2019 in response to high passenger demand on the Beijing–Shanghai high-speed railway. These sets are 440 m (1,443 ft 7 in) and have a passenger capacity of 1,283 people. 13 sets have been manufactured. This model is no longer produced.

=== CR400AF–C ===
8-car ATO enabled version with redesigned interior and exterior. It is manufactured by CRRC Qingdao Sifang. 3 sets have been manufactured, including one converted to CR400AF–Z. This model is no longer produced.

=== CR400AF–G ===
8-car sandstorm and cold climate resistant version. It is manufactured by CRRC Qingdao Sifang. 4 sets have been manufactured, including one gauge-changing technology demonstrator. On the gauge-changing set, the gauge-changing bogies have been replaced with regular bogies when the train entered service.

=== CR400AF–Z ===
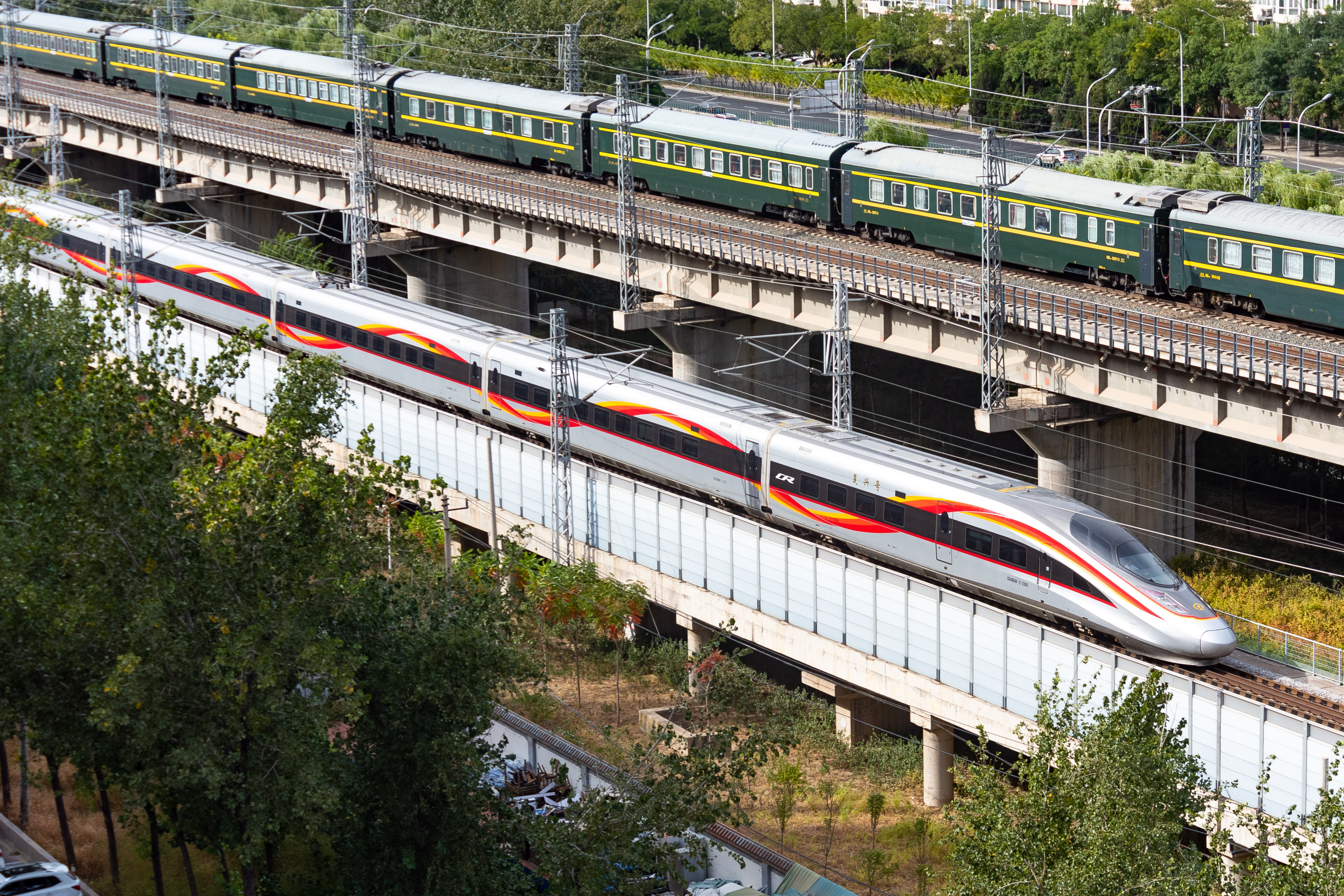
The CR400AF-Z on Beijing–Guangzhou high-speed railway

8-car variant with redesigned and upgraded interior and exterior. It is manufactured by CRRC Qingdao Sifang. It is now being used on most of the high speed railway in China. They have a capacity of 578 passengers. This model superseded the CR400AF. 117 sets have been manufactured, excluding the set converted from CR400AF–C.

=== CR400AF–AZ ===
16-car variant with upgraded train system. Manufactured by CRRC Qingdao Sifang. This model superseded the CR400AF–A. 5 sets have been manufactured.

=== CR400AF–BZ ===
17-car variant with redesigned and upgraded interior and exterior. It is manufactured by CRRC Qingdao Sifang. This model superseded the CR400AF–B. 2 sets have been manufactured.

=== CR400AF–S ===
An upgraded 8-car variant of CR400AF-Z (see below) with enhancements to the interior to accommodate more passengers. It has a capacity of 619 passengers. This model superseded the CR400AF–Z. 209 sets have been manufactured.

=== CR400AF–AS ===
An upgraded 16-car variant, known as the CR400AF-AS, was introduced in September 2025 with upgraded train system and can accommodate more passengers. It has a capacity of 1254 passengers. This model superseded the CR400AF–AZ. 32 sets have been manufactured.

=== CR400AF–BS ===
An upgraded 17-car variant, known as the CR400AF-BS, was introduced in April 2024 for operation on the Beijing-Shanghai high-speed railway, beginning 15 June 2024. This variant features interior enhancements to accommodate more passengers and includes a new seating class called Premium First Class, positioned between First Class and Business Class. This model superseded the CR400AF–BZ. 5 sets have been manufactured.

=== CR400AF–AE ===
16-car sleeper variant with upgraded train system. Manufactured by CRRC Qingdao Sifang. It is Operation by Beijing West/Shanghai-Hongqiao to Hong Kong West Kowloon High Speed Sleeper Train Service use only. Notably, this is the first sleeper train in the world to be capable of 350 km/h operation. 5 sets have been manufactured.

=== CR400AF–J ===
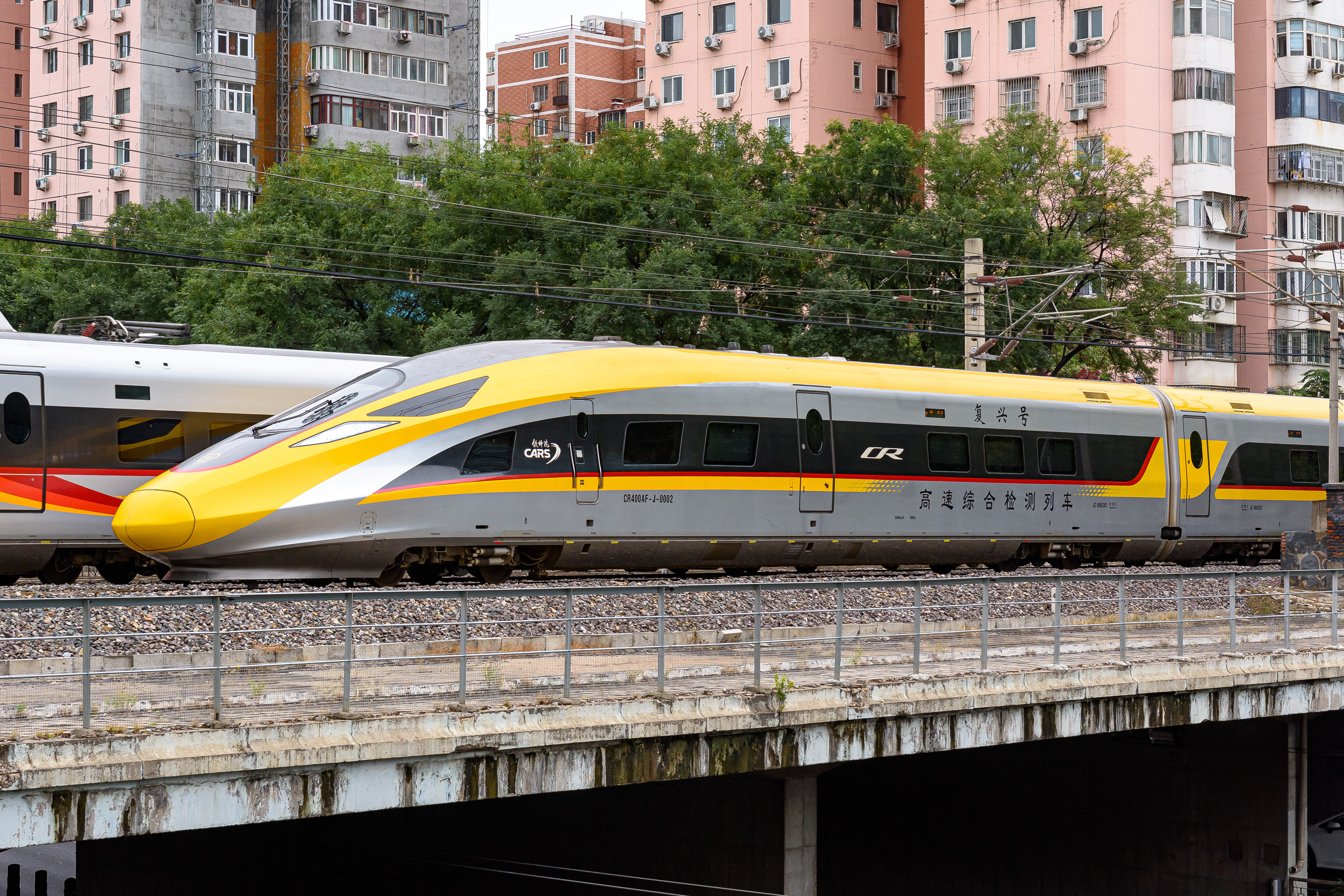
The CR400AF-J

The CR400AF-J is a 8-car comprehensive inspection train.

=== CR400AF-X ===
The new upgraded 3rd generation CR400AF EMU that uses technology from the CR450 series. FIrst entered operation in September 2026. 6 sets of the first operational batch has been manufactured and CRRC Qingdao Sifang is continuing to make more of these types of trains, although not replacing the original CR400AF.

== Specification ==
Train type	Car dimensions	Total length	Top speed	Seating capacity	Formation	Power output (under 25 kV)	Entry into Service
CR400AF/AF–A/AF–B
CR400AF	End cars length: 27.91 m (91 ft 7 in); Inter cars length: 25.65 m (84 ft 2 in); Width: 3.36 m (11 ft 0 in); Height: 4.05 m (13 ft 3 in)	Calculated: 209.72 m (688 ft 1 in); Real: 209 m (685 ft 8 in)	Test: 420 km/h (261 mph); Design: 400 km/h (249 mph); Continuous operation: 400 km/h (249 mph); Current operation: 350 km/h (217 mph)	556: 10 business, 28 first and 518 standard 576: 10 business, 28 first and 538 standard 392: 10 business, 24 first and 358 standard	4M4T	10.4 MW (13,947 hp)	August 15, 2016
CR400AF–A	End cars length: 27.91 m (91 ft 7 in); Inter cars length: 25.65 m (84 ft 2 in); Width: 3.36 m (11 ft 0 in); Height: 4.05 m (13 ft 3 in)	Calculated: 414.92 m (1,361 ft 3 in); Real: 414 m (1,358 ft 3 in)	Test: 420 km/h (261 mph); Design: 400 km/h (249 mph); Continuous operation: 400 km/h (249 mph); Current operation: 350 km/h (217 mph)	1193: 22 business, 148 first and 1023 standard	8M8T	20.8 MW (27,893 hp)	June 16, 2018
CR400AF–B	End cars length: 27.91 m (91 ft 7 in); Inter cars length: 25.65 m (84 ft 2 in); Width: 3.36 m (11 ft 0 in); Height: 4.05 m (13 ft 3 in)	Calculated: 438.928 m (1,440 ft 0.6 in); Real: 439.8 m (1,442 ft 11 in)	Test: 420 km/h (261 mph); Design: 400 km/h (249 mph); Continuous operation: 400 km/h (249 mph); Current operation: 350 km/h (217 mph)	1283: 22 business, 148 first and 1113 standard	8M9T	20.8 MW (27,893 hp)	January 5, 2019

== Formation ==
Power Destination

- M – Motor car
- T – Trailer car
- C – Driver cabin
- P – Pantograph

Coach Type

- ZY – First Class Coach
- ZE – Second Class Coach
- ZEC – Second Class Coach/Buffet Car
- ZYE – First Class/Second Class Coach
- ZYS – First Class/Business Coach
- ZES – Second Class/Business Coach
- WR – Soft Sleeper Car
- WRC – Soft Sleeper/Dining Car
- DGN – Multi-function Coach

=== CR400AF, CR400AF–C, CR400AF–Z, CR400AF–G, CR400AF–S ===
Coach No.	1	2	3	4	5	6	7	8
Type^{1}^{2}^{3}^{4}^{5}	ZYS	ZE			ZEC	ZE		ZES
Type^{6}	ZY	CA	WR					ZY
Power Configuration	Mc	Tp	M		T	M	Tp	Mc
Power Units	Unit 1				Unit 2			
Capacity^{1}	5+28	90		75	63	90		5+40
Capacity^{2}	5+24	60		48	42	60		5+28
Capacity^{3}	6+28	90		75	63	90		6+40
Capacity^{4}	5+28	90		75	63	90		6+40
Capacity^{5}	5+32	93		78	83	93		6+43
Capacity^{6}	7+24	/	2+36			24	2+14	7+24

- ^1 Remaining series
- ^2 Train No. CR400AF–2017, CR400AF–2142 to CR400AF–2146
- ^3 Remaining CR400AF–Z series, and CR400AF–C–2214
- ^4 Train No. CR400AF–Z–1059 to CR400AF–Z–1063, CR400AF–Z–2316 to CR400AF–Z–2340
- ^5 Train No. CR400AF–S–1064 to CR400AF–S–1080, CR400AF–S–2346 to CR400AF–S–2397
- ^6 Train No. CR400AF–2018 to CR400AF–2020, 2029, 2369, 2818 (Government trains)

=== CR400AF–2808 (Government Train) ===
Coach No.	1	2	3	4	5	6	7	8	9	10	11	12
Type	ZY	CA	ZY	WR								
Power Configuration	Tc	M	Tp	M		Tp	M	T	M	Tp	M	Tc
Power Units	Unit 1				Unit 2				Unit 3			
Capacity	7+24	/	60	2+36						24	2+14	24

=== CR400AF–A, CR400AF–AZ, CR400AF–AS, CR400AF–AE ===
Coach No.	1	2	3	4	5	6	7	8	9	10	11	12	13	14	15	16
Type^{1}^{2}^{3}^{4}	SW	ZY	ZE						ZEC	ZE					ZY	ZYS
Type^{5}	ZYE	WR						WRC	WR							ZYE
Power Configuration	Tc	M	Tp	M		Tp	M	T		M	Tp	M		Tp	M	Tc
Power Units	Unit 1				Unit 2				Unit 3				Unit 4			
Capacity^{1}	5+12	60	90					75	48	90					60	5+28
Capacity^{2}	6+12	60	90					75	48	90					60	6+28
Capacity^{3}	6+14	62	93					78	73	93					62	5+24
Capacity^{4}	5+14	62	93					78	73	93					62	5+32
Capacity^{5}	12+45	40						18	40							12+45

- ^1 CR400AF–A series
- ^2 CR400AF–AZ series
- ^3 CR400AF–AS series (with preferred first-class seats)
- ^4 CR400AF–AS series (without preferred first-class seats)
- ^5 CR400AF–AE series

=== CR400AF–B, CR400AF–BZ, CR400AF–BS ===
Coach No.	1	2	3	4	5	6	7	8	9	10	11	12	13	14	15	16	17
Type^{1}^{2}	SW	ZY	ZE						ZEC	ZE						ZY	ZYS
Power Configuration	Tc	M	Tp	M		Tp	M	T		M	Tp	M		Tp	M	T	Tc
Power Units	Unit 1				Unit 2				Unit 3				Unit 4				
Capacity^{1}	5+12	60	90					75	48	90						60	5+28
Capacity^{2}	6+12	60	90					75	48	90						60	6+28
Capacity^{3}	6+14	62	93					78	73	93						62	5+24

- ^1 CR400AF–B series
- ^2 CR400AF–BZ series
- ^3 CR400AF–BS series

== Distribution ==
As of August 2026, there are 672 CR400AF series EMU in service (661 in China and 11 in Indonesia).

Train model letter identification

- G – Cold-resistant
- C, Z – Intelligent
- S – Enhanced-technology
- E – Sleeper
- A – 16-car trainset
- B – 17-car trainset

Vehicle number distinction

- 00XX – Sample vehicles, test vehicles
- 01XX, 02XX – Vehicles or sample vehicles purchased by non-national railway groups
- 1XXX: Trains produced from Qingdao Sifang Alstom (Bombardier)
- 2XXX: Trains produced from CRRC Qingdao Sifang Locomotive and Rolling Stock

Operator	Quantity	Serial number	Depot	Notes
CR400AF
CR Beijing	5	2183–2187	Beijing South	2183–2187 have LKJ train operation monitoring devices End cars of 2186, 2187 have small windows
CR Beijing	23	0207, 0208, 2002, 2004, 2006, 2007, 2009, 2010, 2012, 2014-2016, 2034, 2047, 2048, 2142–2144, 2179, 2181, 2182, 2213	Beijing West	0207, 0208 are original models 2+2 second class seats in 2142–2144; 2213 original number was 2021
CR Beijing	8	2008, 2030, 2033, 2058, 2145, 2146, 2178, 2180	Xiong'an	2+2 second class seats in 2145, 2146
CR Guangzhou	2	2011, 2228	Guangzhou South	2228 equipped with driver cab's door
CR Guangzhou	22	1006-1025, 1039	Chaozhou	1006 original number was 1001; 1039, 1040 equipped with driver cab's door
CR Guangzhou	31	2017, 2024, 2026-2028, 2035-2038, 2040-2046, 2051, 2053-2055, 2057, 2060-2062, 2064, 2130, 2131, 2133, 2226, 2227, 2229	Changsha	2226, 2227, 2229 equipped with driver cab's door
CR Jinan	7	2094, 2095, 2139, 2141, 2162, 2163, 2230, 2231	Jinan East	2230, 2231 equipped with driver cab's door
CR Jinan	13	2085–2093, 2134, 2136-2138	Jinan	
CR Wuhan	25	2124-2128, 2148–2156, 2159–2161, 2164, 2171–2177	Yichang	
CR Chengdu	17	2005, 2013, 2025, 2031, 2032, 2049, 2135, 2140, 2236, 2244–2248, 2254–2256	Chongqing West	2236, 2244–2248, 2254–2256 equipped with driver cab's door
CR Shanghai	15	2222–2225, 2232–2235, 2237–2243	Shanghai Hongqiao	All equipped with driver cab's door
CR Nanning	16	2001, 2003, 2022, 2039, 2050, 2052, 2056, 2059, 2063, 2129, 2132, 2147, 2157, 2158, 2165, 2170	Nanning Tunil	
KCIC400AF
Kereta Cepat Indonesia China	11	22 02–22 12	Tegalluar	
CR400AF-A
CR Guangzhou	11	1003, 1005, 1026, 1027, 1030, 1032, 1034–1038	Guangzhou South	
CR Guangzhou	24	1001, 1002, 1004, 1026, 1030, 1031, 1033, 2065, 2066, 2069-2073, 2076-2079, 2082, 2096, 2098, 2105, 2194, 2195	Shenzhen	1001 original number was 1002
CR Guangzhou	15	2067, 2068, 2070, 2075, 2080, 2081, 2083, 2084, 2095, 2097, 2099, 2100, 2103, 2104, 2106	Changsha	
CR Jinan	19	2101, 2102, 2107-2115, 2193, 2201-2205, 2211, 2212	Jinan East	
CR Wuhan	8	2190–2192, 2196–2200	Wuhan	
CR400AF-B
CR Beijing	13	2116–2123, 2206–2210	Beijing South	Original license plate number 2116 was 2117.
CR400AF-G
CR Beijing	4	0021, 2215–2217	Beijing South	0021 used to be the 400kph test vehicle 2215–2217 equipped with driver cab's door
CR400AF-C
CR Beijing	1	2214	Xiong'an	Original number was 0210, equipped with driver cab's door and only Fuxing train with HUD display
CR400AF-Z
CR Beijing	10	2291, 2293	Beijing South	
CR Beijing	8	2251, 2252, 2286–2290, 2292	Shijiazhuang	
CR Chengdu	2	2253, 2257	Chongqing West	2253 original number was CR400AF-C-0209
CR Chengdu	5	1041, 1043, 1047, 1049, 1055	Chengdu East	
CR Chengdu	13	1042, 1044, 1045, 1046, 1048, 1050–1054, 1056–1058	Guiyang North	
CR Wuhan	8	0211–0218	Wuhan	
CR Nanchang	22	0219-0223, 2284, 2285, 2299, 2301, 2303-2308, 2316-2318, 2335, 2337-2339	Nanchang West	Trainsets 2316-2318, 2335, and 2337-2339 are 577-seat models.
CR Nanchang	7	2294-2298, 2300, 2302	Fuzhou South	
CR Nanchang	23	1059-1063, 2319-2334, 2336, 2340	Xiamen North	All are 577-seat models.
CR Guangzhou	14	2258–2271	Changsha	
CR Jinan	14	2272–2283, 2309, 2310	Linyi North	
CR400AF-AZ
CR Guangzhou	5	2311–2315	Changsha	
CR400AF-BZ
CR Beijing	2	2249, 2250	Beijing South	
CR400AF-S
CR Guangzhou	33	0225-0227, 0231, 0233, 0235, 0238, 0239, 1064-1068, 1073-1083, 1087, 1088, 1112, 1113, 2363, 2384, 2385, 2511, 2512	Shenzhen	
CR Guangzhou	19	0224, 0228～0230, 0232, 0234, 0236, 0237, 0240～0242, 2362, 2364, 2366, 2367, 2368, 2383, 2501, 2502	Zhanjiang	
CR Guangzhou	9	2365, 2369～2371, 2382, 2394～2397	Changsha	
CR Chengdu	24	1069-1072, 1084-1086, 1089-1105	Chengdu East	
CR Chengdu	19	2386, 2387, 2403-2406, 2419-2422, 2430-2432, 2439, 2440, 2457, 2458, 2475, 2476	Chongqing West	
CR Beijing	7	2346-2348, 2480, 2481, 2506, 2507	Shijiazhuang	
CR Wuhan	14	2349, 2350, 2359, 2360, 2393, 2413, 2414, 2424, 2425, 2433, 2459, 2469, 2471, 2472	Wuhan	
CR Wuhan	14	2351, 2352, 2389～2392, 2423, 2434, 2441, 2442, 2449, 2450, 2460, 2470	Hankou	
CR Jinan	7	2503, 2504, 2508–2510, 2513, 2514	Jinan East	
CR Jinan	20	2353-2358, 2372-2376, 2435, 2436, 2452, 2461-2464, 2477, 2478	Qingdao North	
CR Taiyuan	13	2377-2381, 2411, 2412, 2437, 2438, 2447, 2448, 2451, 2505	Taiyuan	
CR Nanning	22	2361, 2388, 2407-2410, 2415-2418, 2428, 2429, 2445, 2446, 2453-2456, 2467, 2468, 2473, 2474	Nanning Tunil	
CR Kunming	7	2426, 2427, 2443, 2444, 2465, 2466, 2479	Kunming South	
CR400AF-AS
CR Chengdu	9	1110, 1111, 2515-2521	Chengdu East	All are 1261-seats models, no preferred first class seats
CR Beijing	5	2482-2486	Beijing South	
CR Guangzhou	9	2487-2495	Changsha	
CR Jinan	9	1106-1109, 2496-2500	Qingdao North	
CR400AF-BS
CR Beijing	5	2341–2345	Beijing South	
CR400AF-AE
CR Guangzhou	5	2398–2402	Shenzhen	
CR400AF (Officials)
Government of China	4	2018, 2019, 2808, 2818	Special Transportation Office	Official Trains; Carriage 6 of trainset 2808 and 2818 have similar structures to CRH380A–2808; Trainset 2808 have 12 carriages instead of regular 8
CR400AF-J
China Railway of Academy Sciences	1	0002	—N/a	
CR400AF-Z
Guangzhou Railway Vocational Technical College	1	CR400AF-Z-GRP01	—N/a	Teaching vehicle, power configuration is 1M1T
KCIC400AF-CIT
Kereta Cepat Indonesia China	1	22 01	Tegalluar	Comprehensive Inspection Train
CR400AF-S
	1	0001		Double-decker EMU test train

== Gallery ==
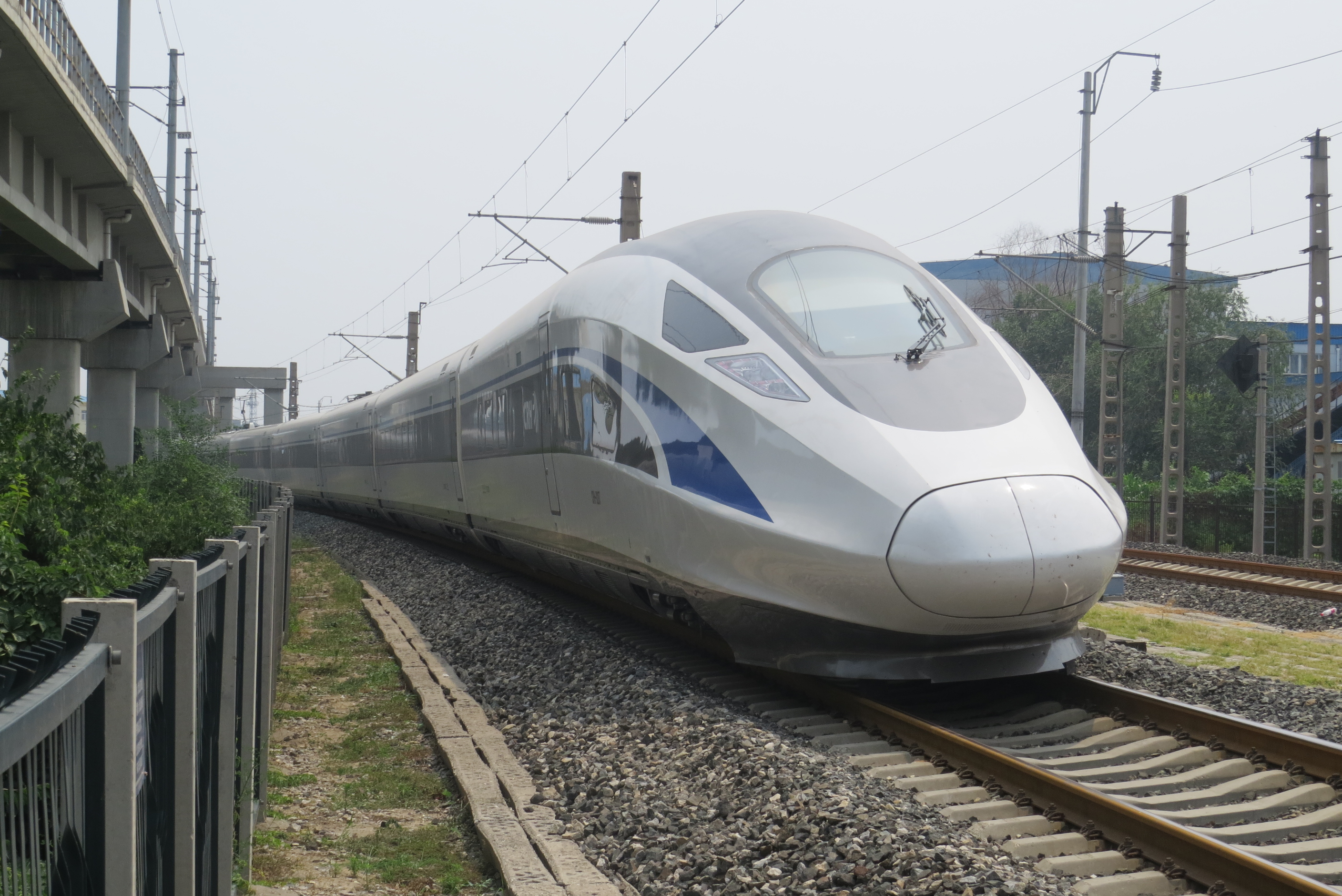
CR400AF prototype testing in the National Railway Test Center, Beijing. It was called CRH-0208 at that time.

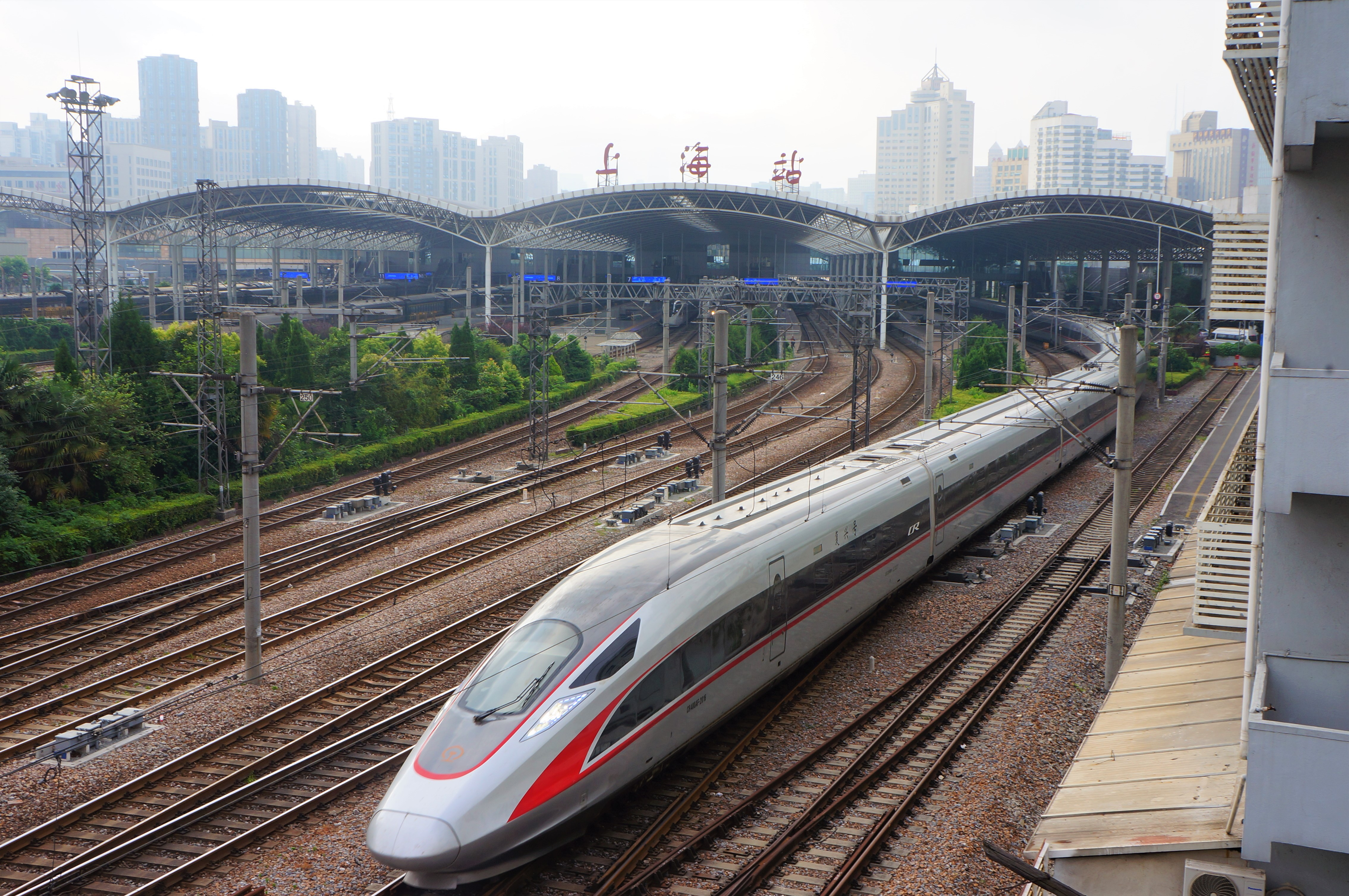
CR400AF-2016 departing Shanghai railway station as G6

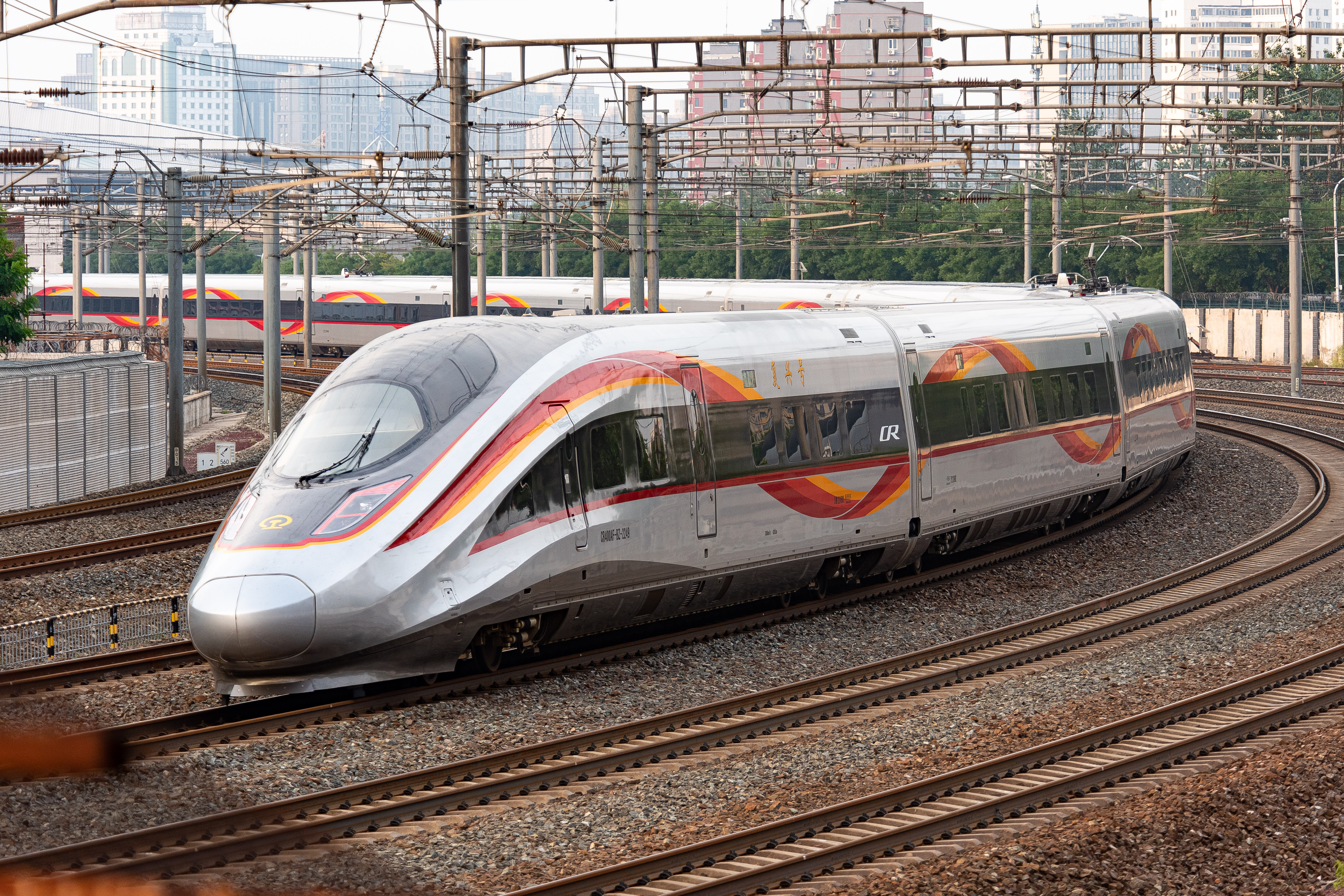
CR400AF-BZ-2249 at Beijing South railway station

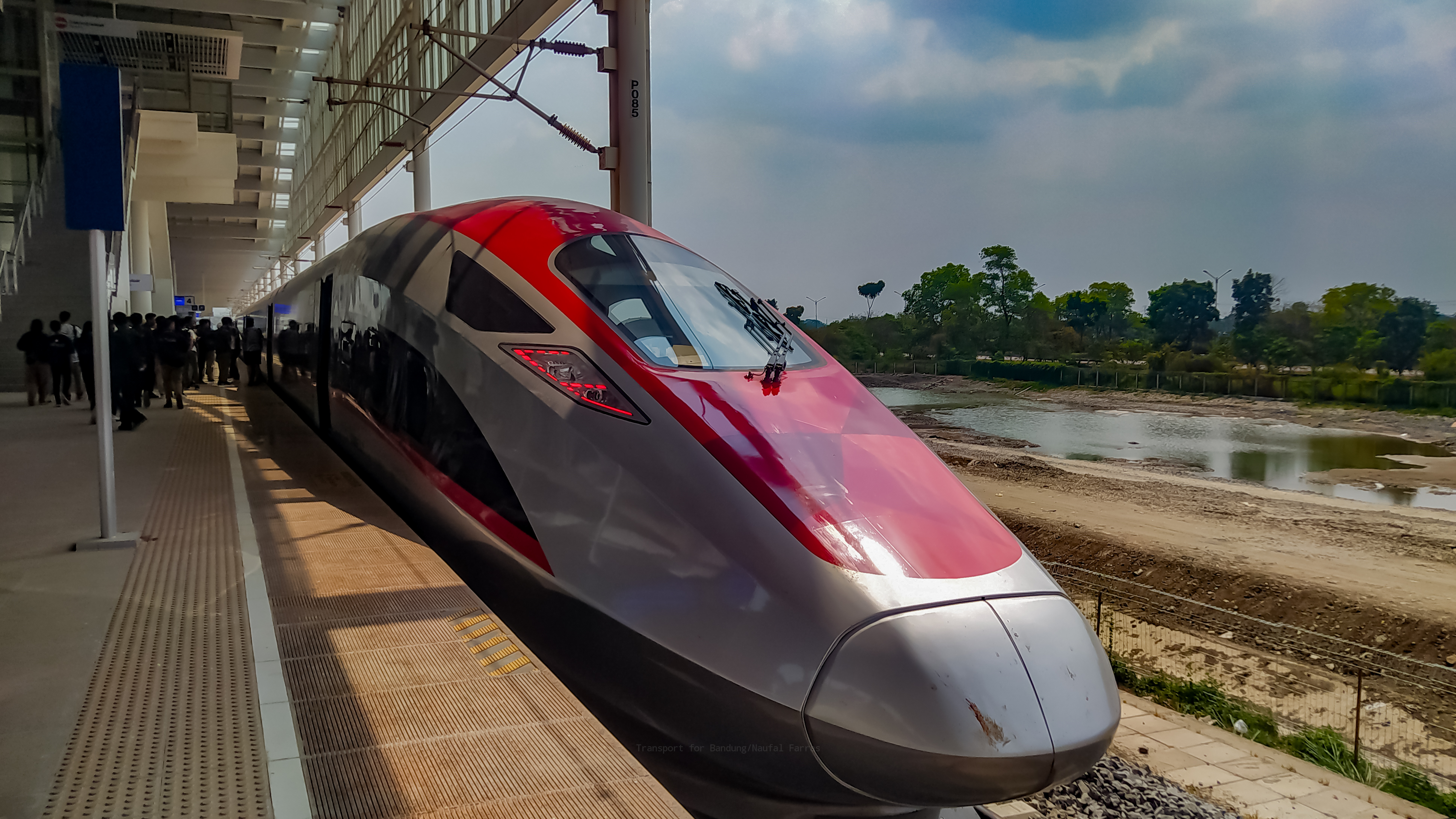
KCIC400AF at Tegalluar station, awaiting departure to Jakarta's Halim station

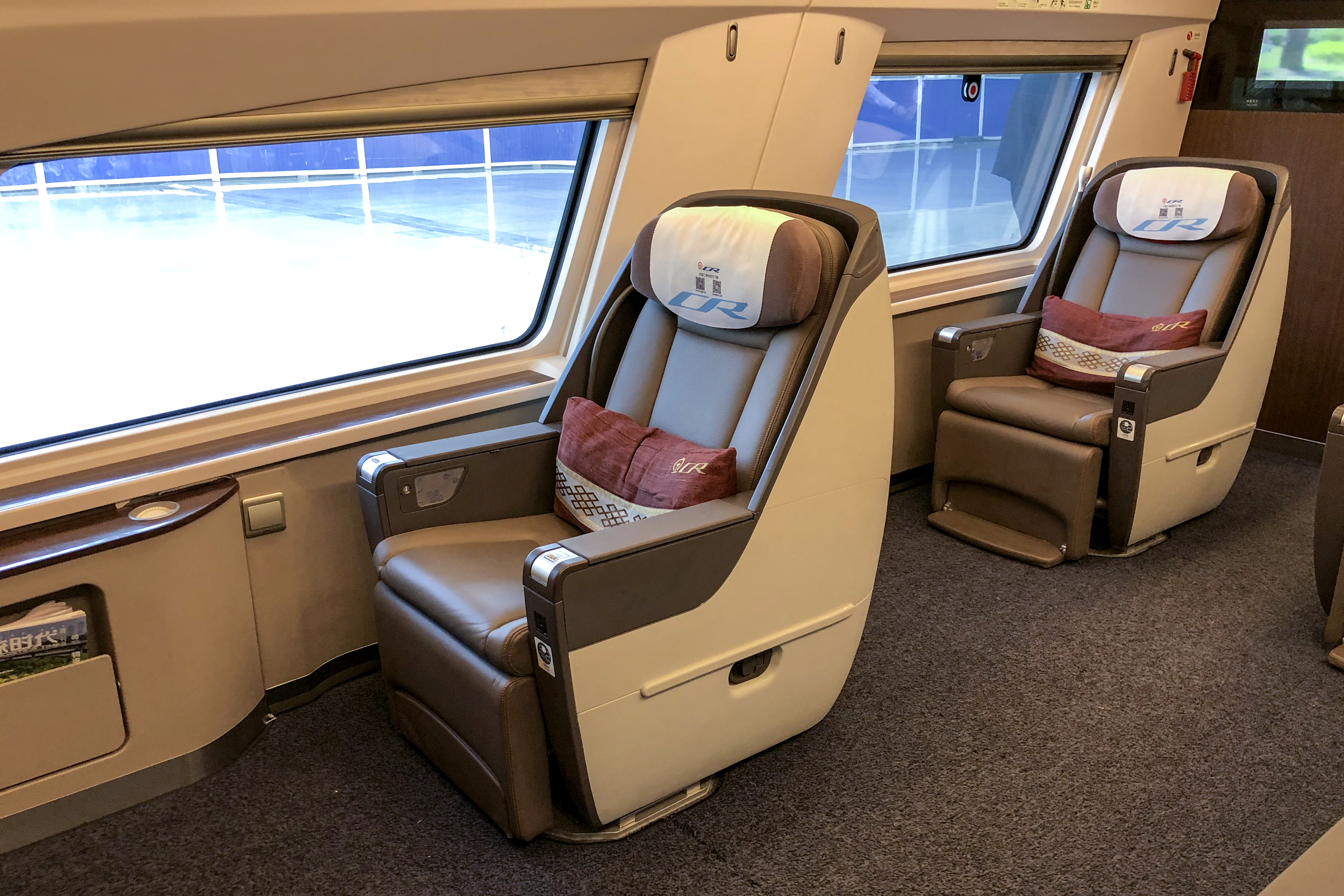
Business class seats on CR400AF-B-2116

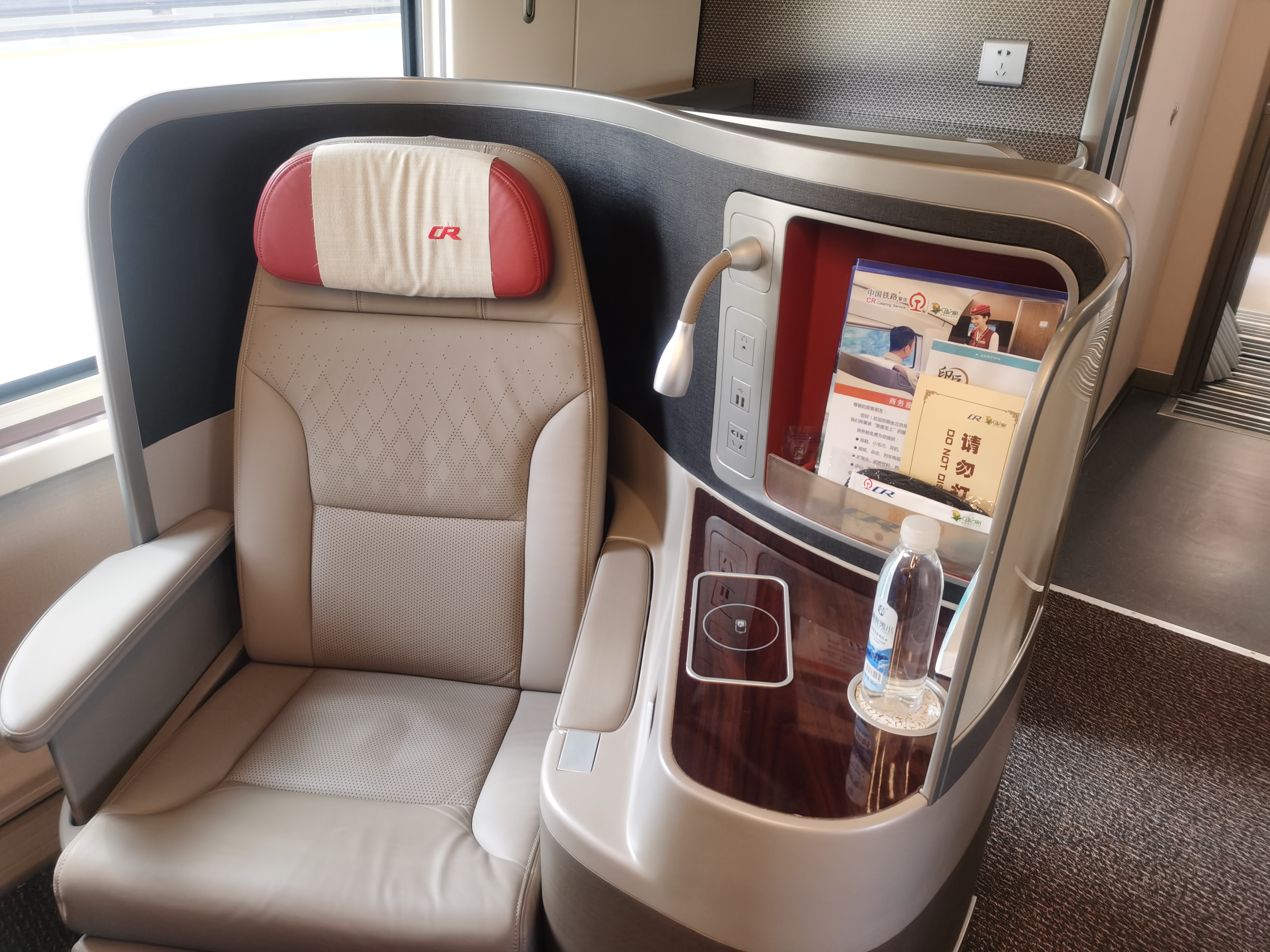
Redesigned business class seats on CR400AF-BZ-2249

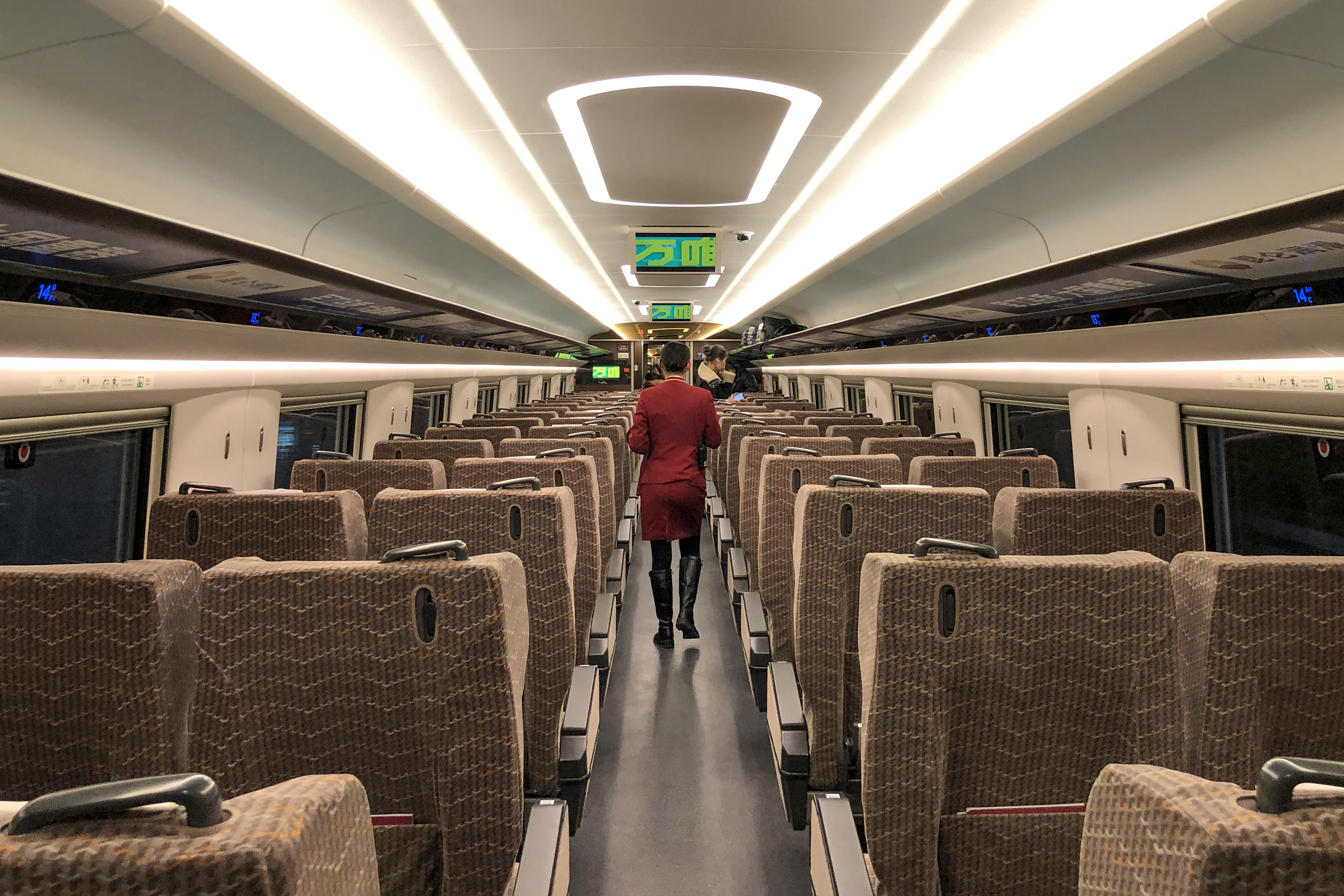
First Class cabin interior on CR400AF-B-2119

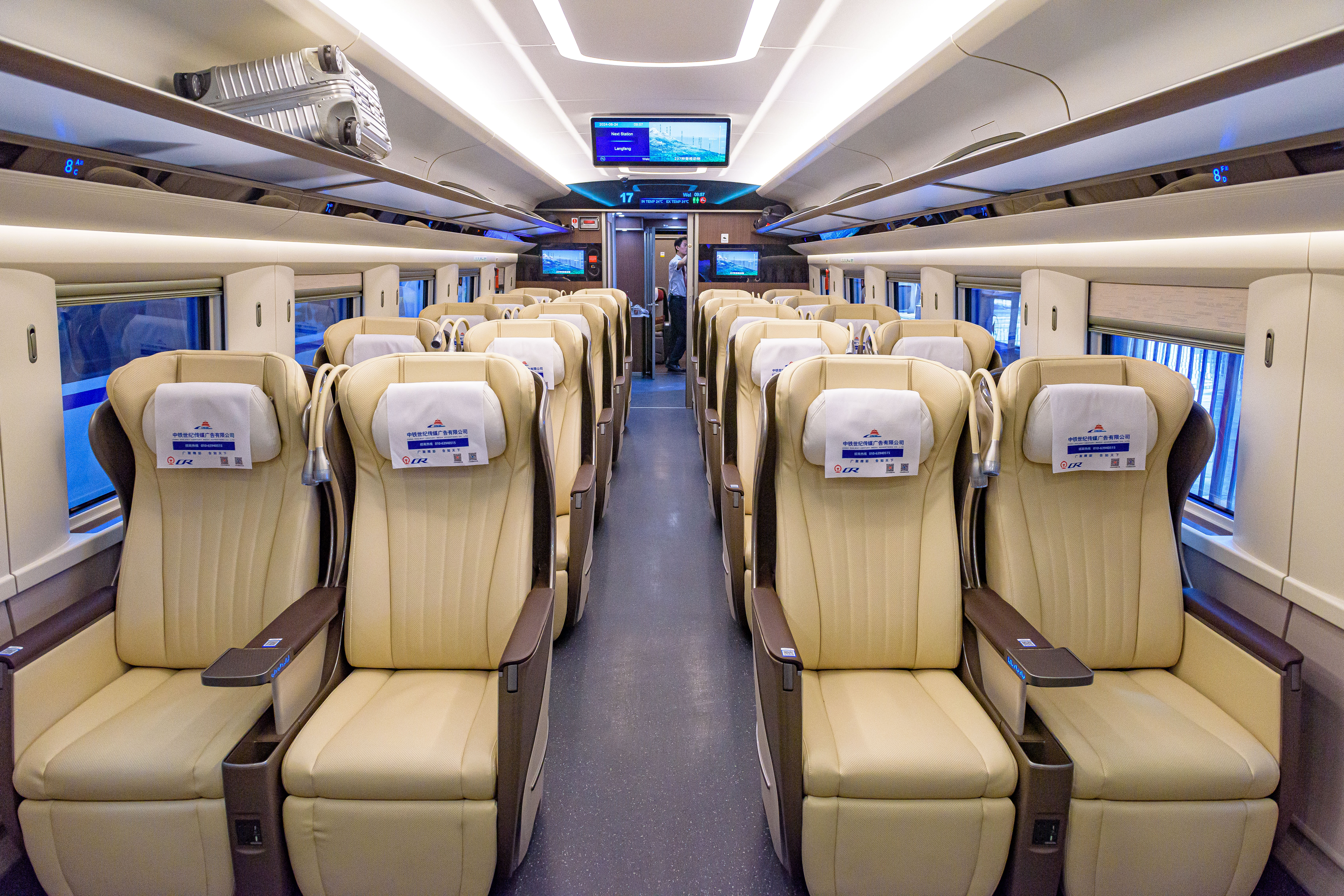
Premium First Class on CR400AF-BS-2344

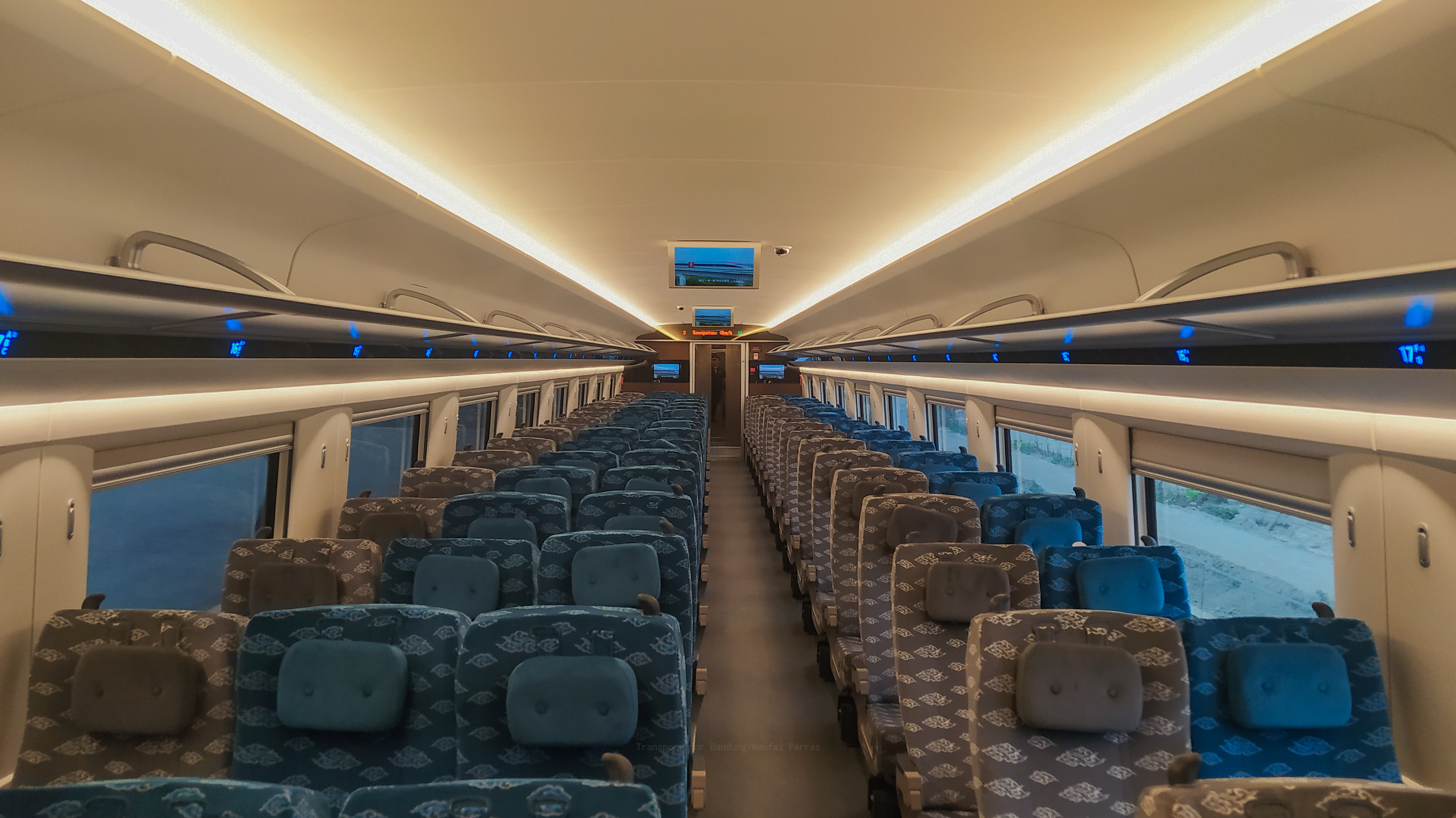
Premium Economy class seats on KCIC400AF, operating in Indonesia

== See also ==
- China Railway CR400BF
- China Railway CR300AF
- China Railway CR300BF
- China Railway High-speed, Chinese high-speed railway service provided by China Railway.
- China Railway, Chinese state-owned corporation that operates all Fuxing trains.
- Fuxing (train), the train brand CR400AF is part of.
