= High-speed rail in Indonesia =

Whoosh

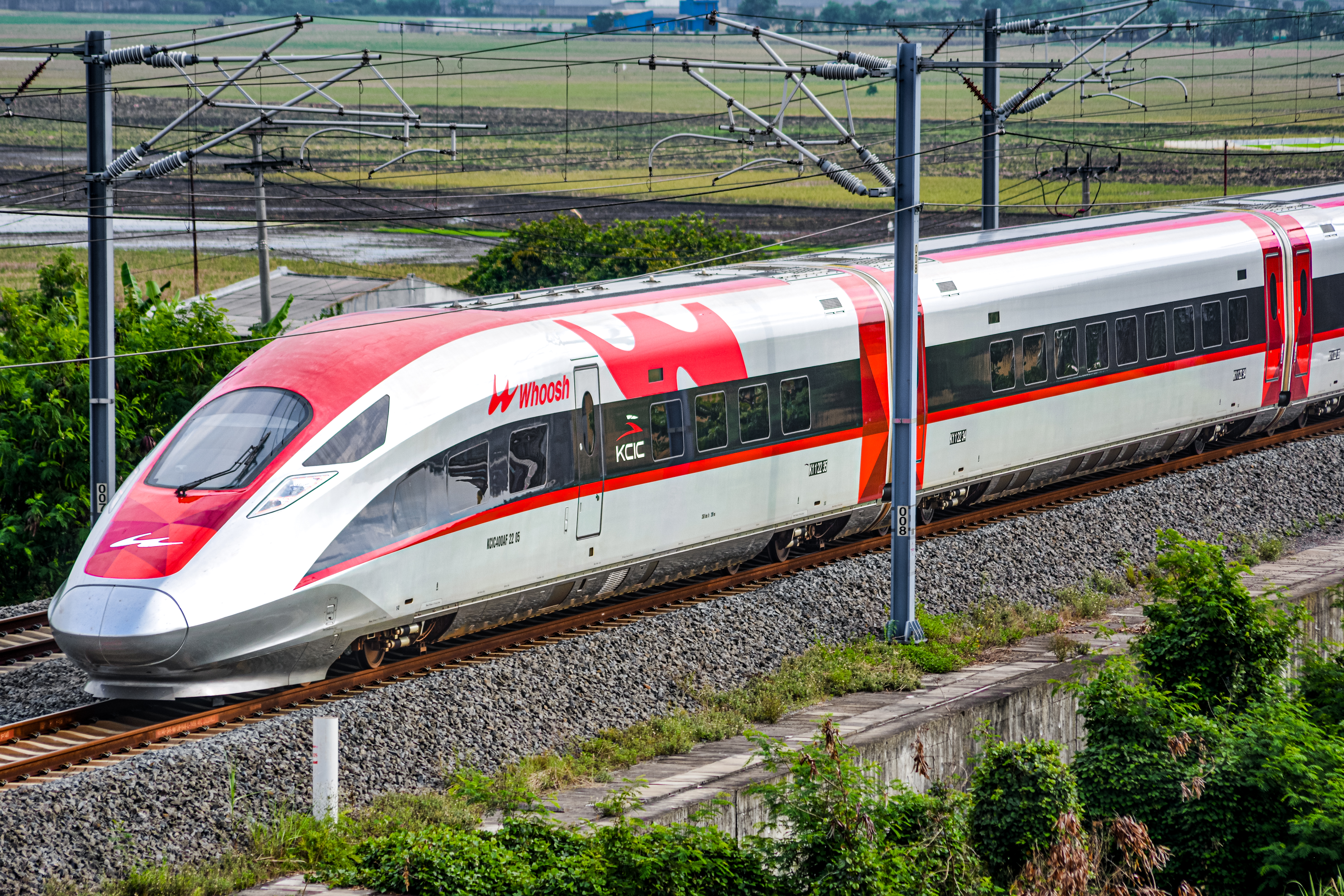
- KCIC400AF passing through Bandung

Overview
- Native name: Waktu Hemat, Operasi Optimal, Sistem Hebat
- Owner: Kereta Cepat Indonesia China (KCIC)
- Locale: Java
- Termini: Halim (Jakarta); Tegalluar Summarecon (Bandung)
- Stations: 4
- Website: kcic.co.id

Service
- Type: High-speed rail
- Operator: Kereta Cepat Indonesia China (KCIC)
- Depot: Tegalluar
- Rolling stock: KCIC400AF
- Daily ridership: 26,770 (daily peak); 18,200 (average)
- Ridership: 6.06 million (2024); 12.10 million (Oct 2023 – Oct 2025)

History
- Opened: 17 October 2023; 3 years ago

Technical
- Line length: 142.8 km (88.7 mi)
- Num of tracks: Double-track
- Character: Viaduct, Tunnel, and grade-separated
- Track gauge: 1,435 mm (4 ft 8 1/2 in) standard gauge
- Electrification: 25 kV 50 Hz AC overhead catenary
- Operating speed: Service: 350 km/h (220 mph); Record: trial run: 385 km/h (240 mph); Design: 420 km/h (260 mph)
- Train protection system: CTCS level 3
- Highest elevation: 824 m (2,703 ft)

Current and proposed high-speed railway in Java, Indonesia

Indonesia operates a single high-speed rail service between Jakarta, the country's capital and largest metropolitan area, and Bandung, the third largest metropolitan area. The service is branded as Whoosh (short for Waktu Hemat, Operasi Optimal, Sistem Hebat, 'Time Saving, Optimal Operation, Outstanding System') and operated by Kereta Cepat Indonesia China (KCIC), with plans of extending the line to Surabaya, the second largest metropolitan area.

The Whoosh is the first high-speed railway in Southeast Asia and the Southern Hemisphere. It covers a distance of 143 kilometres (89 mi) with a maximum operating speed of 350 km/h (220 mph), and design speed of KCIC400AF train of 420 km/h (260 mph), making it the fastest commercially operating railway network in the world, tied with a handful of lines in China. The travel time between the two cities averages 35 minutes, down from 3 hours with the existing railway line.

Construction started in August 2018, with the cost of $7.3 billion to build, the line began trial operation with passengers on 7 September 2023 and commercial operations on 17 October 2023. The Whoosh high-speed train has served 6.06 million passengers during a full year in 2024. As of September 2024, there are 62 daily trips of Whoosh. By 17 October 2025, in its second year of operation, Whoosh high-speed rail has transported over 12 million passengers safely.

As of 2025, the line is still unprofitable and has been described by the CEO of the state railway operator, Bobby Rasyidin, as a "financial time bomb" and a Belt and Road Initiative "cautionary tale". However, Setara Institute executive director Piter Abdullah praised the Whoosh high-speed railway for its value as a catalyst for economic activity and growth in the region by providing shorter travel times between the two metropolises, which has led to an annual increase in total passenger numbers.

== History and development ==
Concepts for high-speed rail (HSR) in Indonesia were first seriously contemplated in 2008, leading to discussions at Asian Investment Summit in 2013, and detailed plans being set forth in 2015. The plan to start construction of the Jakarta-Bandung HSR was announced by the Indonesian government in July 2015, after the Chinese President and other world leaders visited the Bandung Conference.

Both Japan and China expressed their interest in the high-speed rail projects in Indonesia. Previously, both countries had carried out comprehensive studies into a project for the Jakarta–Bandung section (142.8 km (88.7 mi)). Only the Japanese International Cooperation Agency (JICA), had issued a study for a project extending to Surabaya (730 km (450 mi)). The Indonesian HSR bid marked a rivalry between Japan and China in their competition for Asian infrastructure projects.

=== Japan's proposal ===
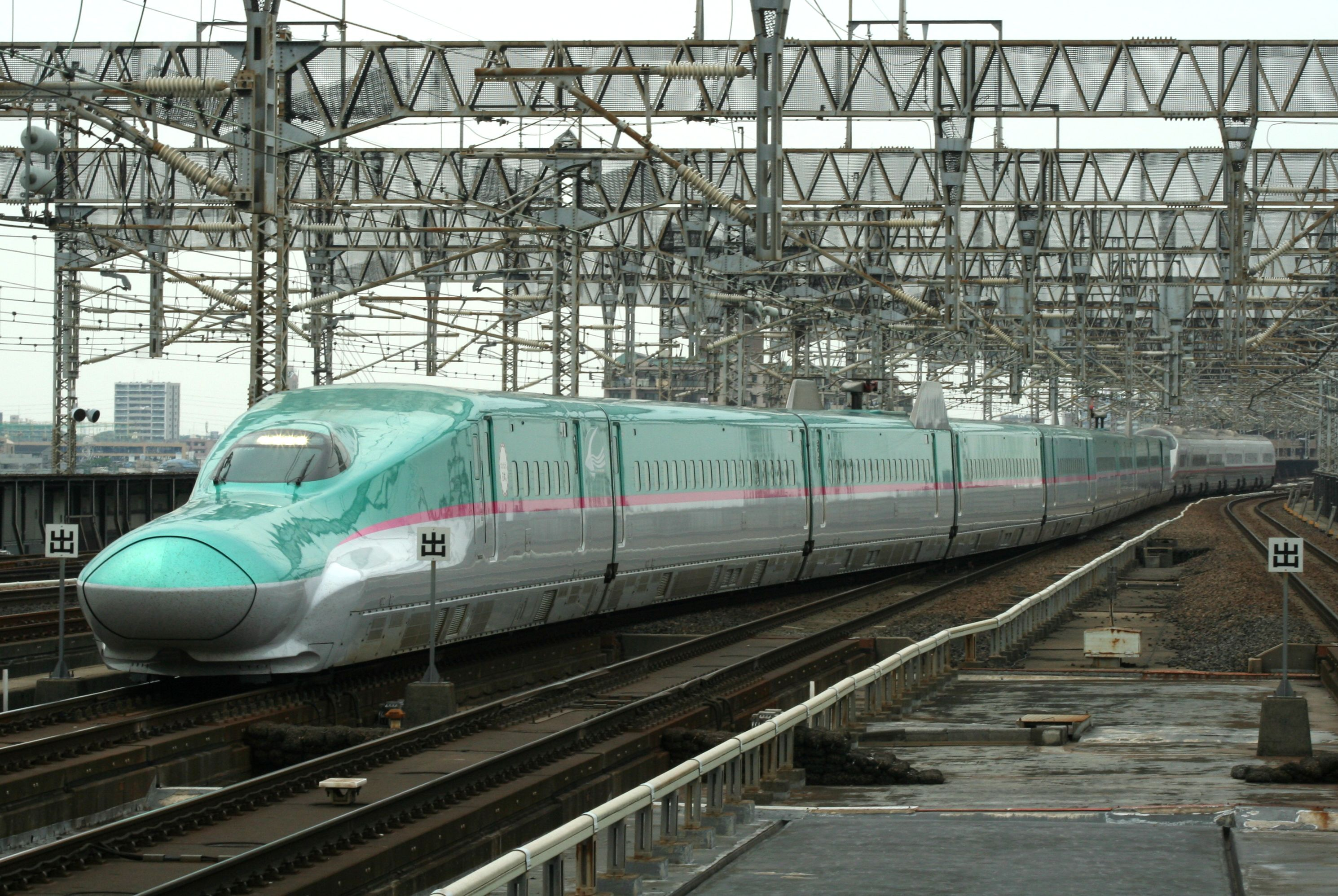
Shinkansen E5 series proposed by Japan

Since 2008, Japan has been working on a plan to export their Shinkansen high-speed railway technology to Indonesia. During the Indonesia-Japan Friendship Festival in November 2008, Japan showcased their Shinkansen technology to Indonesian audiences. The idea of high-speed rail backed by funding through soft loans has been proposed by Japan International Cooperation Agency (JICA) for the Indonesian island of Java, linking up the densely populated corridor from the capital Jakarta to Surabaya (730 km (450 mi)). The island, similar in many respects including terrain and urban density to pre-HSR Honshu, suffered greatly from both freight and passenger congestion.

The idea had been around for some years. However, a new proposal to divide the project into stages emerged, with the first stage being built from Jakarta to Bandung. The conventional travel time of 3 hours would be reduced to 35 minutes at a price of 78 trillion rupiah. JICA finished the detailed feasibility study in 2014. This succeeded an initial study in 2012. By 2013 Indonesia had been undergoing a revival in railway expansion and upgrades. High-speed corridors had been proposed but not implemented.

Japanese domination in the high-speed rail project appeared to be unchallenged until April 2015, when China made a counter-offer.

In March 2015, Indonesian president Joko Widodo travelled to Tokyo and Beijing. In Tokyo, from 22 to 25 March, Joko Widodo met then-Japanese Prime Minister Shinzo Abe. Widodo obtained a commitment for Japanese loan support for improving Jakarta's municipal rail network, but no progress was made on resolving issues with the Jakarta–Bandung high-speed rail project.

=== China's proposal ===
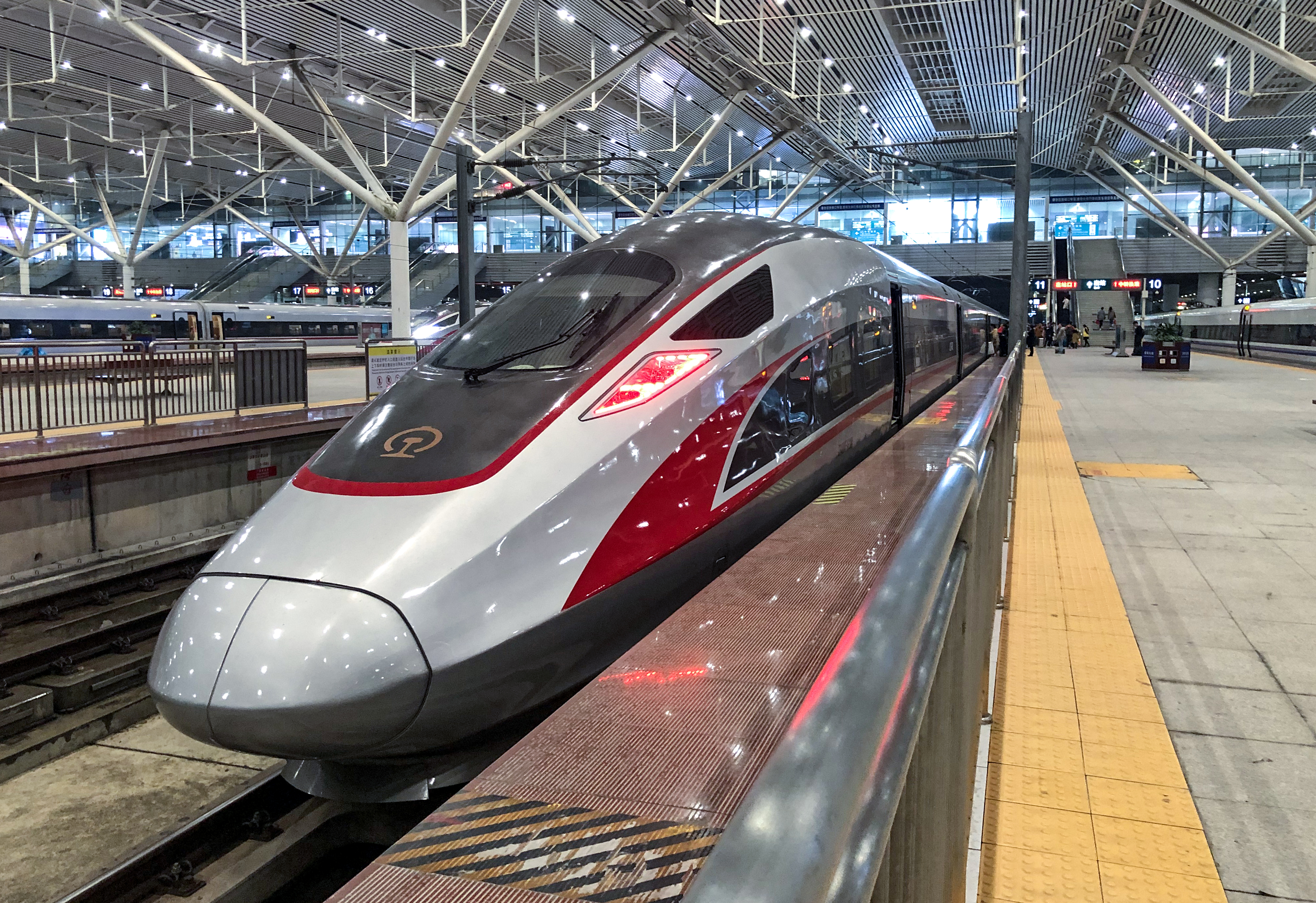
CR400AF proposed by China

On 26 March 2015, Joko Widodo visited Beijing and met China's leader Xi Jinping. Xi publicly announced support for the Indonesian high-speed project and the two governments signed a memorandum specifying China's interest in the Jakarta–Bandung line. In April 2015, China submitted a bid for the Indonesian high-speed rail project, much to Japan's dismay.

In July 2015, the Indonesian government released its plan to build the high-speed rail connecting Jakarta and Bandung, and arranged a contest between Japanese and Chinese train-makers as potential bidders. China responded by launching the Chinese High-speed Rail Technology Exposition in Senayan City shopping mall in Jakarta in August 2015.

Both China and Japan have engaged in fierce competition through intense lobbying for the contract. Some, including the Jakarta Post's Craig Oehlers, have said that the fundamental reason for the two countries' competition is geostrategy, rather than economics.

=== Short cancellation and resumption ===
President Joko Widodo was expected to announce the winning bid of Indonesia's first high-speed rail project in early September 2015. However, on 3 September 2015, the Indonesian government announced that it had cancelled the high-speed rail project, and was now favouring the slower and cheaper rail alternative.

In mid-September 2015, China announced it would fully meet the Indonesian government's demands and offered a new proposal that did not require Indonesia to assume any fiscal burden or debt guarantee in proceeding with the project. Later that month, Indonesia selected China for the $5 billion project. Indonesia awarded the contract to China. Some analysts speculated that Beijing had outmaneuvered Tokyo on the bid as a result of a competitive financing package for Indonesia.

=== Japan's response ===
Japan's then-Chief Cabinet Secretary Yoshihide Suga called the Indonesian move "difficult to understand" and "extremely regrettable". The situation "can only be described as extremely deplorable," Suga also said. Indonesia's State-Owned Enterprises Minister Rini Soemarno confirmed the Chinese bid was picked instead of the Japanese plan because of its relaxed financing.

China supplemented its bid by committing to establish a joint venture with Indonesian firms to produce rolling stock for high-speed rail, electric rail, light rail systems, not only for Indonesia but also for export to other Asian countries; to transfer related technology; and to renovate and rebuild train stations.

=== Development and construction ===
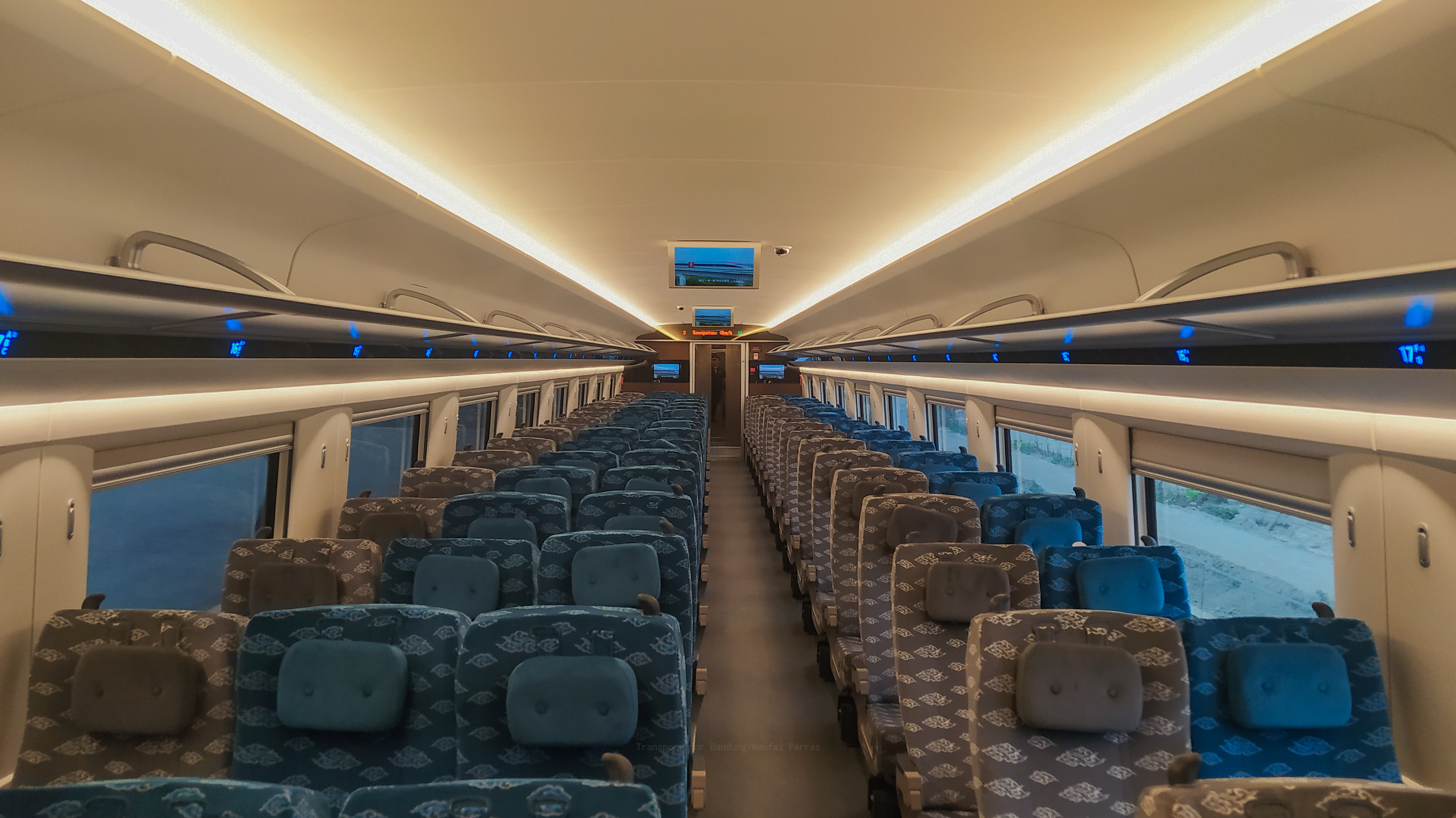
Interior of Premium Economy Class of KCIC400AF

In January 2016, the Indonesian transportation minister released a route permit for a high-speed railway between Jakarta and Bandung (142.8 kilometres) with stations located at Halim (Jakarta end), Karawang, Padalarang, and Tegalluar (Bandung end) with a Tegalluar depot. 71.63-kilometre (44.51 mi) of the track would be at ground level, 53.54-kilometre (33.27 mi) would be elevated, and 15.63-kilometre (9.71 mi) would be underground. The concession period, the period during which only the KCIC can operate the line, is 50 years from 31 May 2019 and cannot be prolonged, except in a force majeure situation. Ground was broken on the project on 21 January 2016 and was expected to be completed in September 2023. The HSR is governed by the KCIC, an organization composed 60 percent by an Indonesian consortium, and 40 percent by China Railway International. The Jakarta–Bandung high-speed rail was planned to begin its operations in 2019.

In October 2016, the Indonesian government announced its intention to build a 600-kilometre (370 mi) medium-high speed railway between Jakarta and Surabaya, and invited Japan to participate in this project. However, almost seven years later, in July 2023 the project was cancelled due to the lack of progress. Subsequently, President Joko Widodo removed the Jakarta-Surabaya semi-high speed train from the national strategic project (PSN) towards the end of his term in 2024.

On 18 December 2022, a maintenance train derailed in Padalarang, West Java, after overshooting an unfinished track, killing two Chinese workers and four others.

In 2023, the Jakarta-Bandung High-Speed Rail construction partially finished and was set to start commercial operation starting October 2023. The Jakarta-Bandung HSR began trial operation with passengers on 7 September 2023, and commercial operations on 2 October 2023.

=== Controversies ===
In April 2016, five Chinese high-speed rail project workers were arrested at Halim Perdanakusuma Airbase. This incident highlighted the refusal of the Indonesian Air Force to give up lands belonging to the airbase in East Jakarta. It was reported that one of the railway stations would be located on land that is currently within the base.

Ignasius Jonan, who was the Minister of Transportation when the high-speed rail project was first started, initially rejected it when the project was turned over from Japan to China due to high operational costs and other additional expenses from China´s side. However, Jonan was relieved from his position as the Minister just days before the high-speed rail project was started. Many believe he was actually relieved from his position due to his disagreement for turning the high-speed rail project from Japan to China.

In February 2018, Onan Hiroshi, a Japanese cartoonist, described Indonesian President Joko Widodo as a "high-speed rail beggar" and pointed out Indonesia's request for Japan's assistance in completing the project. The cartoon quickly drew protest from Indonesian internet users and by February 25^{th} the cartoonist tweeted an apology, removed the drawings and closed the page.

In October 2025, then-newly appointed Finance Minister Purbaya Yudhi Sadewa announced his strong opposition to using the national state revenue and expenditure budget to cover the debt owed to China for the Indonesia-China high-speed rail project. Purbaya stated that the Indonesia-China high-speed rail project has been too complicated ever since its inception. The operational costs and the debt that must be repaid for the project are unbalanced, as the income from the high-speed rail is only around 1 trillion rupiah per year, while the debt owed to China is approximately 2 trillion rupiah annually.

== Jakarta–Bandung ==
=== Infrastructure ===
11% of the railway consists of tunnel sections spanned over 13 tunnels, while 38% is set on viaducts. Tunnel 6, the longest tunnel, has a length of 4,478 meters on the Jakarta-Bandung high-speed rail. Halim railway station, the largest station on the railway, is situated in Makasar in East Jakarta and consists of three platforms with six track lines; it is connected with LRT Jabodebek. The station has a total area of 78,315 square metres.

The railway is built on a double track and electrified, suitable for 350 km/h (220 mph).

=== Stations ===
Route of Jakarta–Bandung High-Speed Rail

There are four stations on the line. One of them, Karawang, was officially opened on 24 December 2024.

Station	Transfers	Station distance	Travel distance	Location	
Halim	Halim; Halim Perdanakusuma International Airport; TransJakarta regular bus (7W, with further connection to); DAMRI shuttle buses to Soekarno-Hatta International Airport	-	0 km	East Jakarta	Jakarta
Karawang	Shuttle buses to The Grand Outlet and Summarecon Villagio Outlets	41.17 km	41.17 km	Karawang Regency	West Java
Padalarang	Greater Bandung Line Commuter Line; Garut Commuter Line; HSR Feeder service to Bandung Station; Intercity trains; West Bandung and Cimahi public minibuses	55.55 km	97.22 km	West Bandung Regency	West Java
Tegalluar Summarecon	DAMRI and Bigbird shuttle buses (with further transfer to at Gedebage station)	45.58 km	142.80 km	Bandung Regency	West Java

=== Rolling stock ===
The Jakarta-Bandung High-Speed Rail will use 11 trainsets of the derivative of CR400AF called KCIC400AF. There is also one comprehensive inspection train which is also a derivative of CR400AF called KCIC400AF-CIT. All trains are manufactured by CRRC Qingdao Sifang.

=== Maintenance facility ===
- Tegalluar Depot (Cileunyi, Bandung)

=== Funding and joint venture ===
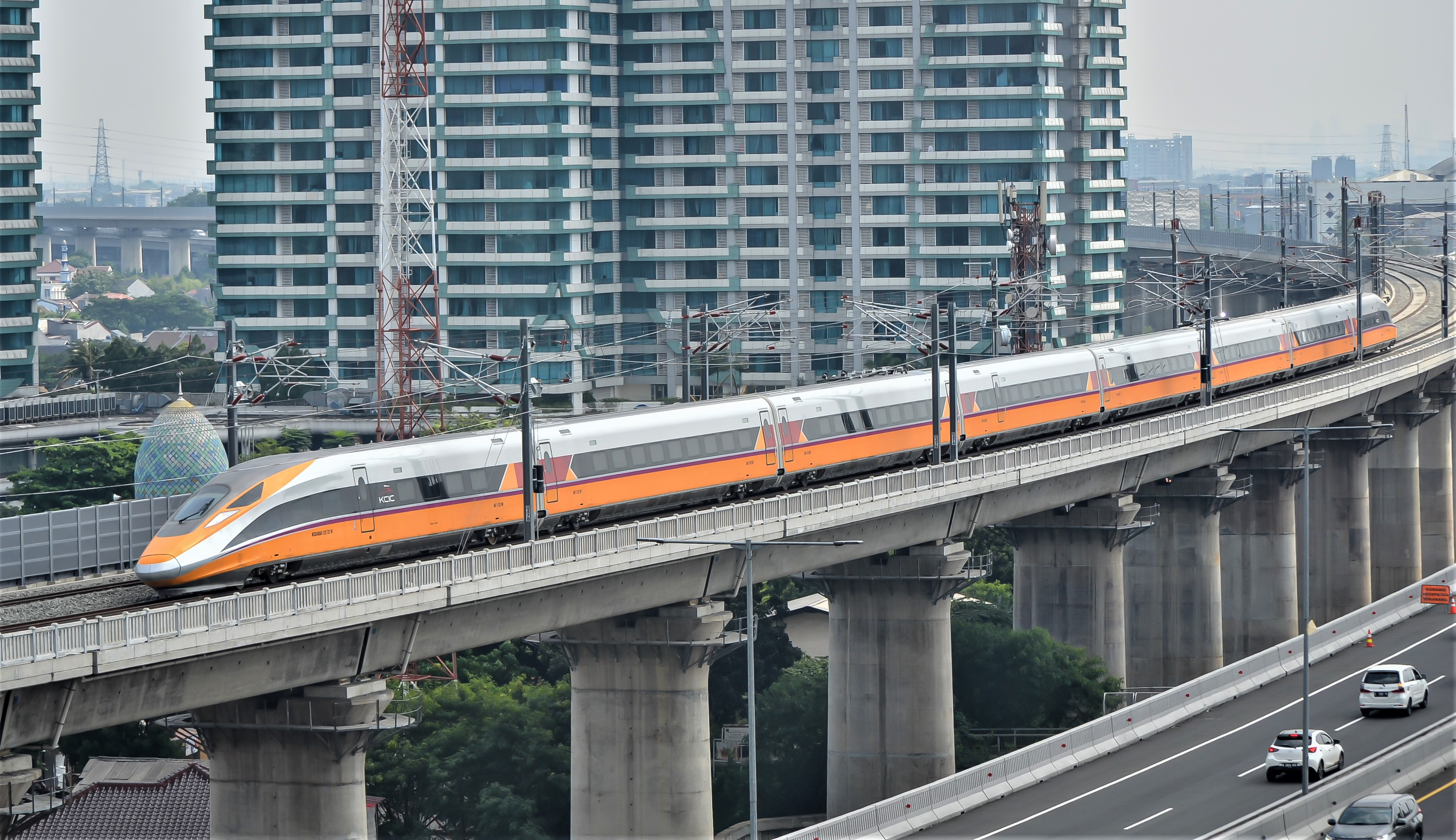
KCIC400AF-CIT passing through Bekasi

The China Railway Group Limited (CREC) will form a joint venture with a consortium of Indonesia's state-owned enterprises (SOEs) led by PT Wijaya Karya Tbk in developing the first High Speed Train (HST) in the country.

On Friday, 16 October 2015, Chinese and Indonesian state-owned companies officially signed the deal to build the first high-speed railway in Indonesia. The project cost was estimated to be US$5.5 billion (80 trillion rupiah). The deal was signed by China Railway International Co. Ltd. Chairman Yang Zhongmin and Dwi Windarto, the president director of a consortium of Indonesian state companies, PT Pilar Sinergi BUMN Indonesia. China Development Bank has given a commitment to fund 75 percent of the project costs with loan terms of 40 years for the loan—with an initial grace period of 10 years—with fixed loan rate. CRCC will hold majority shares in the planned JV company, while WIKA holds 30 percent and small portions for local toll operator PT Jasa Marga Tbk (IDX: JSMR), train operator PT Kereta Api Indonesia and plantation company PT Perkebunan Nusantara VIII.

In August 2016, it was reported that the China Development Bank had not yet disbursed funds for the loan and that KCIC, the consortium executing the project, was not sure when funds would become available.

=== Timeline ===
==== 2016 ====
- January: Indonesian president Joko Widodo attended a ground breaking ceremony near Jakarta and announced that the project had commenced.
- May: Continual delays in acquiring land were being reported. The president of the Indonesian joint venture firm managing the project KCIC, Hanggoro Budi Wiryawan, expressed frustration at the Department of Transport requirement that all of the land needed for the project (estimated to be 600 ha) be acquired before final construction permits could be issued. Hanggoro argued that it was more usual for construction permits to be issued when just 10% of the required land for a project had been acquired. He said that the delays in the Department of Transport were unreasonable. Issues surrounding acquisition of land were complicated by the fact that the main station at the Jakarta end was planned to be on land occupied by the Indonesian Air Force at Halim Perdanakusuma International Airport. It was not clear whether the Air Force was prepared to release the land.
- August: The Minister for State-Owned Enterprises, Rini Soemarno, said that the process of issuing permits for the project was running smoothly after earlier delays. She said that she believed that construction on the railway could start within a week.
- November: 82 percent of land needed has been acquired, but bank funding will only be attainable after 100 percent land is acquired.

==== 2017 ====
- March: The project is stalled due to land, finance and security issues. Among others is the Indonesian Air Force reluctance to release 49 hectares of the lands surrounding Halim Perdanakusuma Airbase on the south-eastern outskirts of Jakarta for the construction of the station.
- April: PT Kereta Cepat Indonesia-China (KCIC) and High-Speed Railway Contractor Consortium (KSRCC) signed an engineering, procurement, and construction (EPC) contract on the Jakarta – Bandung bullet train on April 4, 2017. Contractors will proceed with construction following the contract signing.

==== 2018 ====
- January: The Jakarta Post referred to the project as "stagnant" and Maritime Affairs Coordinating Minister Luhut Binsar Pandjaitan announced that a review would be conducted to consider whether a high-speed rail system really was needed between Jakarta and Bandung because "the cities are only 140 kilometres apart."
- March: It was reported that government agencies (the National Land Agency and the Agrarian and Spatial Planning Ministry) suspected that there had been maladministration in the acquisition of over 1,800 plots of land for the project. As a result, approval of permits for the use of land for the project had been delayed.
- April: State-owned enterprises minister Rini Soemarno, on a visit to Beijing, said that project construction would start in the coming month, May, and that she hoped that perhaps construction could start even sooner. She also said that she hoped land acquisition could be completed by the end of May.
- July: Three lawsuits received legal approval from the courts to proceed with claims seeking compensation for their properties affected by the project. Meanwhile, KCIC said that the progress of the project would not be affected by the lawsuits. The main financier of the project, China Development Bank, had disbursed $170 million in May and was due to disburse another $1.1 billion before the end of July.
- August: Beginning construction by High-Speed Railway Contractor Consortium (HSRCC) after a cooperation contract was signed with Cars Dardela Joint Operation as construction supervisor for the Jakarta-Bandung High Speed Train Project.

==== 2019 ====
- March: The boring machine arrived and was assembled. Drilling started under the Jakarta-Cikampek Toll Road between KM 3+600 - KM5+800. Progress Reached 13%
- May: The Walini tunnel become the first breakthrough tunnel in the high speed rail projects. Celebrated by many group of minister including a Minister of State-Owned Enterprises Rini Soemarno and the West Java Governor Ridwan Kamil. According to Rini Soemarno, progress reached 17.5% but estimated to be 59% in late 2019, and land acquisition was almost 100%. Ridwan Kamil hoped to commence the high speed rail operation in 2021.
- September: The construction progress reached 32.8% and land acquisition progress reached 99.0%.
- October: Construction progress 38.2%.

==== 2020 ====
In mid-February 2020, construction progress reached 44 percent and land acquisitions reach 99.96 percent. Due to the COVID-19 pandemic, work of the project has been halted temporarily, resulting in the delay of the targeted finish of construction and start of the operation. Three months later, construction progress reached 48.3 percent and the construction works resumed, which follow government's health and safety measures, such as social/physical distancing in response to the pandemic. In September, Director of KCIC Xin Xuezhong stated that construction progress reached 60 percent and land acquisitions reached 100 percent.

==== 2021 ====
- April: The General Manager of Material Equipment of PT KCIC stated that until March 2021 the construction of the Jakarta-Bandung High Speed Rail has reached 70 percent and is expected to be completed by the end of 2022.
- November: The construction progress reaches 79%.

==== 2022 ====
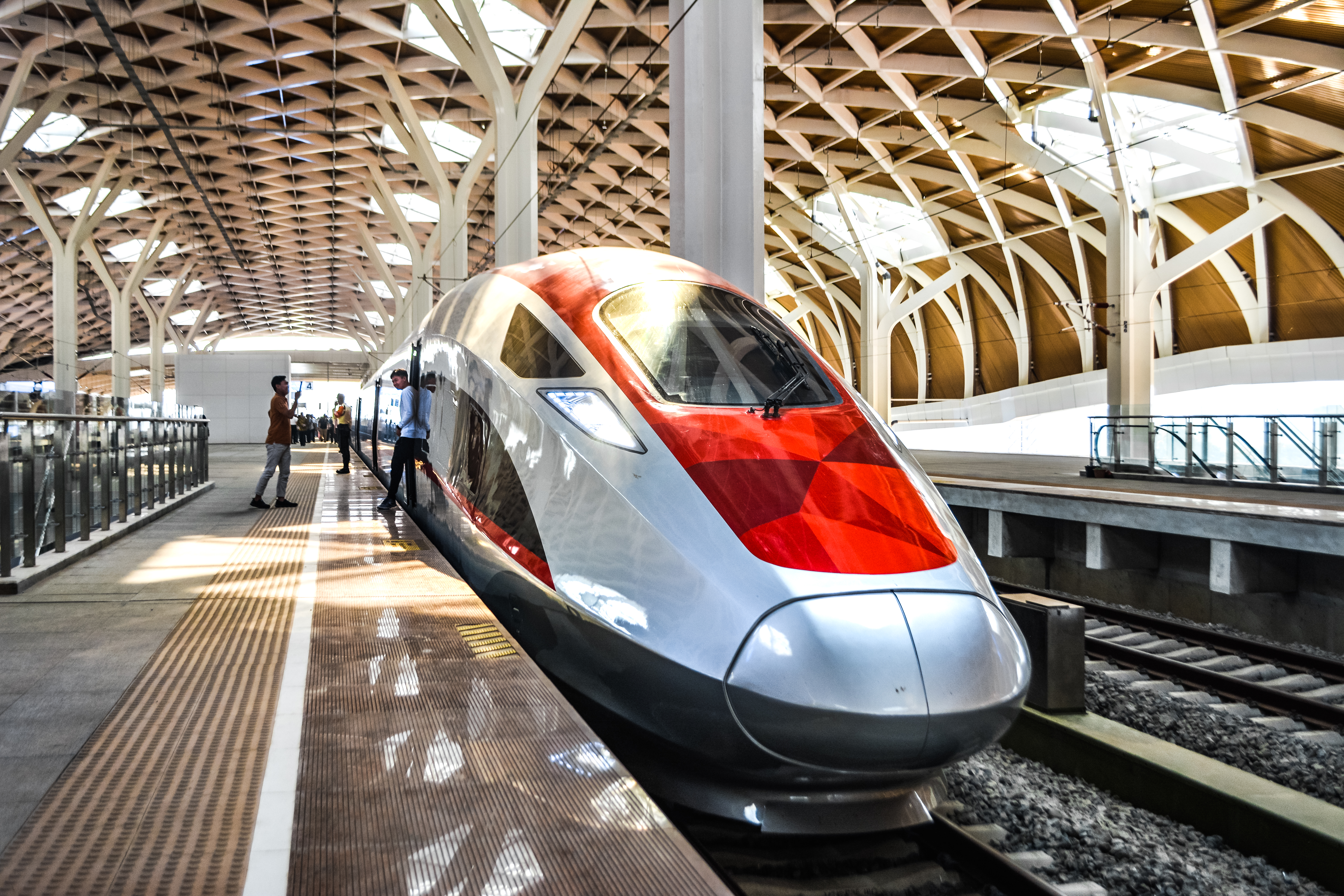
KCIC400AF at Halim Station

- September: KCIC received the first delivery of KCIC400AF trainsets in Tanjung Priok Port, Jakarta.
- November: During the 2022 G20 Summit in Bali, Presidents Jokowi and Xi remotely attended the trial run of CIT400AF inspection train, which ended a series of its maiden powered runs on HSR tracks to the west of Tegalluar station.
- December: A track laying machine and a DF4B locomotive used in the construction of the railway derailed in West Bandung west of Padalarang station, killing two Chinese workers and injuring another four. As result, track laying activities were temporarily halted while other construction works were allowed to continue.

According to the Jakarta Post, Dwiyana Slamet Riyadi, the president director of KCIC, said that based on a 2022 third-party review, demand for the Jakarta-Bandung High-Speed Rail line had fallen to 31,215 passenger trips per day, just over half of the 61,157 estimated in a 2017 feasibility study.

==== 2023 ====
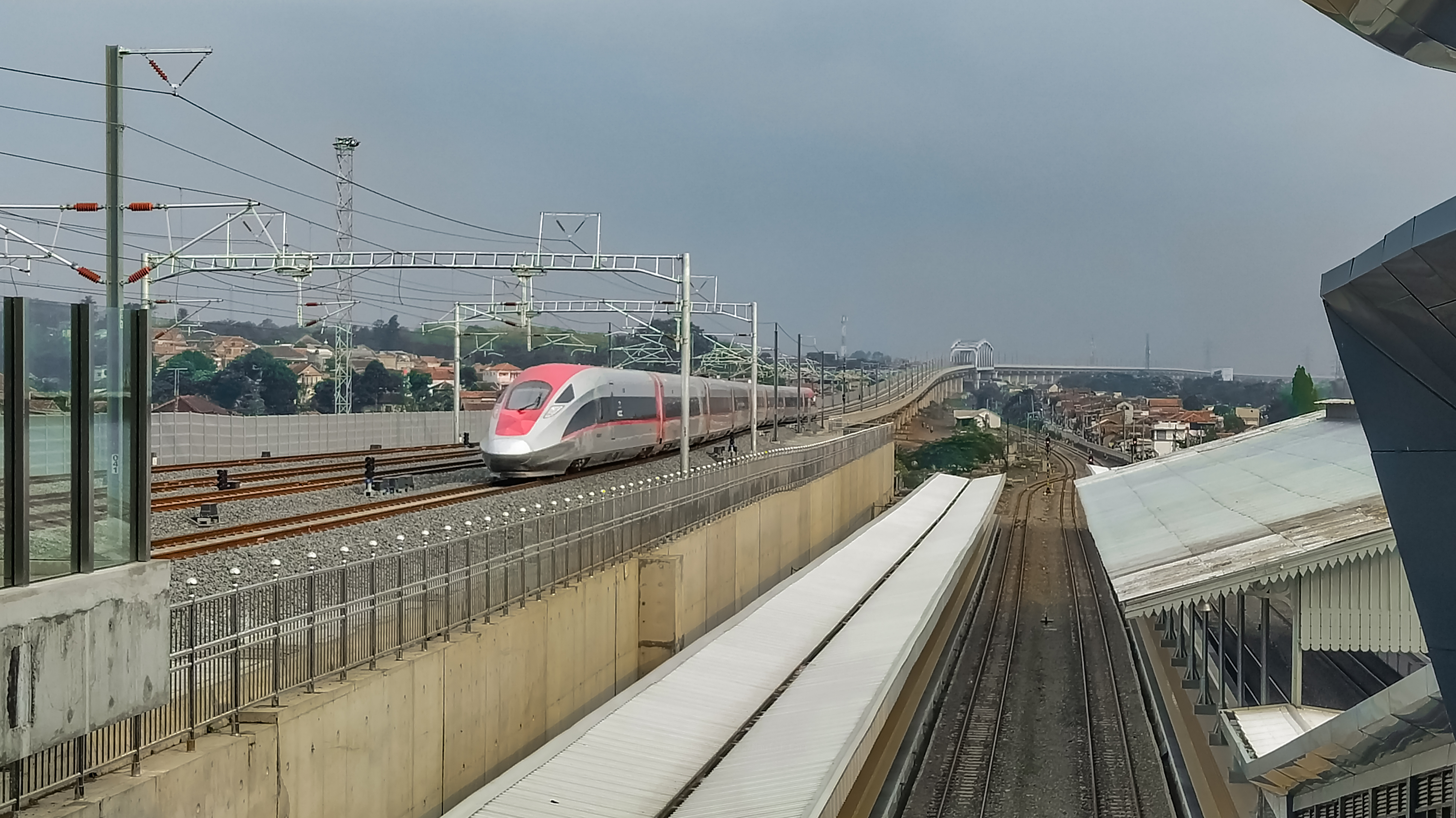
Whoosh high-speed train departing Padalarang for Tegalluar after a 2-minute stop

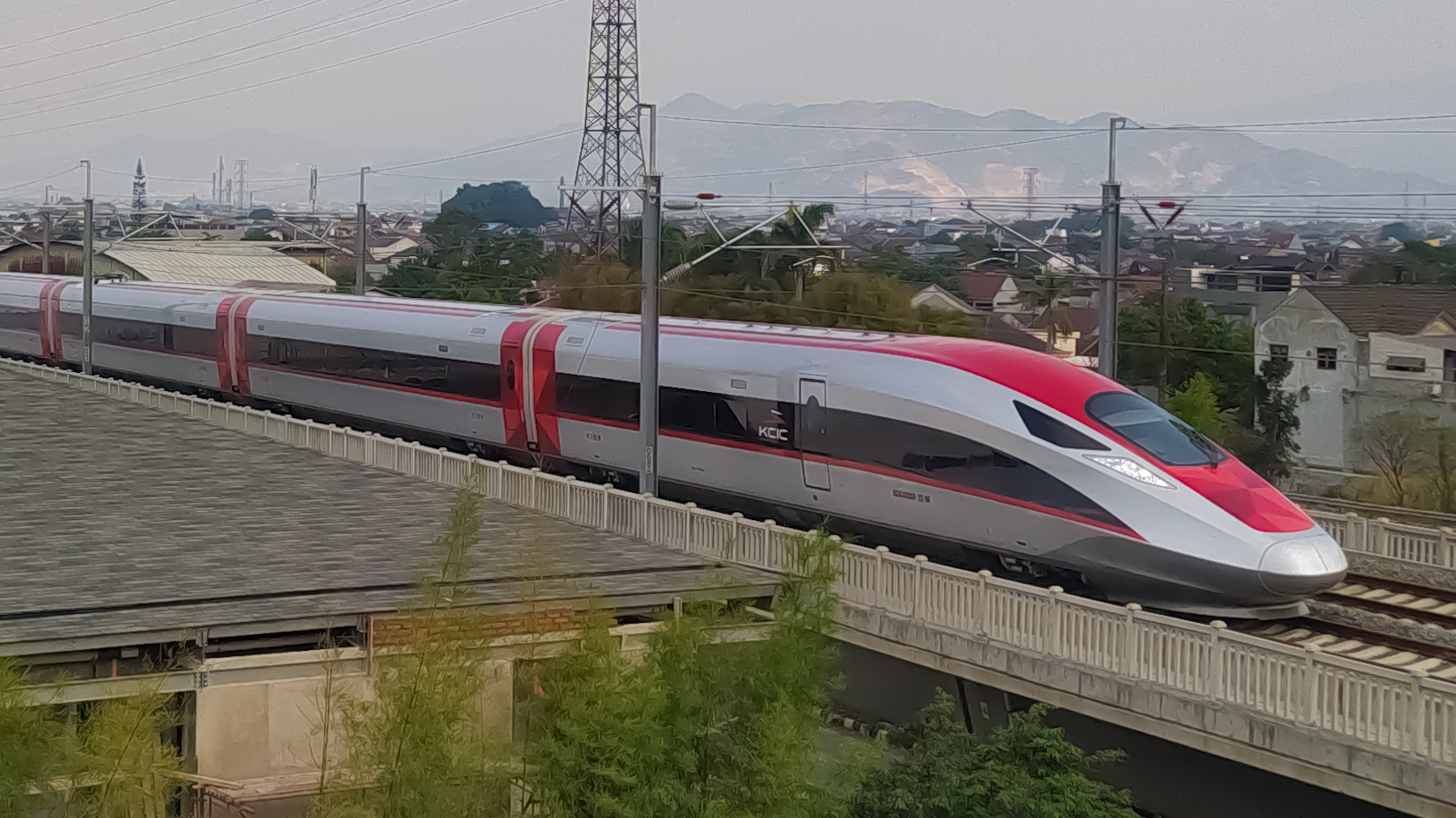
KCIC400AF at Kopo, Bound for Halim

- May: Starting Monday, 22 May 2023, KCIC is gradually increasing the travel speed of the Jakarta Bandung High Speed Train (KCJB). This is done during the test or testing and commissioning of the train. With the comprehensive inspection train (CIT), the speed of the train was increased from the previous average of 60 to 180 km/h (37 to 112 mph). The increase in the speed or speed of the trial can finally be done after all the initial preparations for testing and commissioning have been successfully completed.
- June: The speed level of the Jakarta-Bandung High Speed Train (KCJB) continued to increase during the trial period. For the first time the train reached a maximum speed of 385 km/h (239 mph) in a test on Thursday, 22 June 2023. The trial was attended by Coordinating Minister for Maritime Affairs and Investment Luhut Binsar Pandjaitan and Minister of Transportation Budi Karya Sumadi. Luhut and Budi Karya tried KCJB from Halim Station, Jakarta, to Padalarang Station and Tegalluar Station, Bandung, round trip. The top speed has reached its maximum at 385 km/h (239 mph).
- June: The next trial was connecting the two train series was carried out to test reliability if it runs together as a form of anticipation if passengers boom. At certain moments, the train can be combined to increase the transport capacity. Mainly to anticipate a surge in passengers during high season, such as Eid al-Fitr, Christmas and New Year's homecoming, long holidays, and others.
- September: The High Speed Rail officially opened on Thursday after CCTV announced the opening after many delays of the opening of the line.
- October: The Line commenced operations on 17 October. 124,000 people rode on the Whoosh between October 17 and November 1.
- November: daily trip schedule has been increased to 14 round-trip pairs (for a total of 28 trips) offering 16,828 seats, due to high demand as seen from the high number of ticket sales. The number of passengers has since reached 21,312 people on Sunday, November 12, 2023, with an occupancy rate of 98.5%. As a response to this strong demand, PT. Kereta Cepat Indonesia China has increased the number of Whoosh round-trip pairs to 18 per day on the weekends, for a total of 36 trips.
- December: The Whoosh high speed train has served 1,028,216 passengers during 2 months of commercial operation from 17 October to 25 December 2023. The highest number of passengers served in one day has reached 21,500 passengers per day, including during the current year-end holiday period. This achievement shows the high public interest in modern and reliable public transportation in Indonesia with travel time efficiency and comfort.

== Bandung–Surabaya ==
In 2023, Indonesian and Chinese authorities discussed further plans to extend the railway across the Java island. It is estimated that Phase 2 will shorten the travel time between Jakarta and Surabaya from 8 to 13 hours by regular trains to 3.5 hours.

Based on the study conducted by PT KCIC, several alternative plans for extension routes have been prepared, continuing from Tegalluar in Bandung to Surabaya. Three routes have been considered: the southern route, the central route, and the northern route.

The first option is the southern route from Bandung to Surabaya via Kroya and Yogyakarta. This route covers a distance of 629.5 km and includes 13 stations, with a travel time of 180 minutes.

The second option is the central route via Cirebon and Purwokerto. This route spans 679.2 km, passes through 15 stations, and has a travel time of 193 minutes.

The third option is the northern route via Cirebon and Semarang, which is 642 km long and includes 14 stations, with a travel time of approximately 184 minutes.

The latest recommendation from PT KCIC consultants suggests that the southern route will be considered the main option, primarily because it will reduce the travel time of the Jakarta-Surabaya train service from 10.46 hours by regular train to only 3 hours by high-speed rail.

In November 2025, Indonesian President Prabowo Subianto and the Coordinating Minister of Infrastructure Agus Harimurti Yudhoyono expressed their vision for the Whoosh high-speed rail to extend beyond Surabaya, reaching Banyuwangi, which is the eastern tip of the Java island and over 1,000 km from Jakarta. Although no details on the routing, construction process, or timeline provided, Prabowo stated that Indonesia is strong enough to manage the financial implications of the expansion.

== See also ==
- High-speed rail in Asia
- Greater Jakarta Integrated Mass Transit System
- Jabodebek LRT
- KCJB Feeder Train
- KAI Commuter Line Bandung
- Rail transport in Indonesia
