= Kereta Cepat Indonesia China =

Train operator company in Indonesia

Kereta Cepat Indonesia China 印尼中国高速铁路有限公司

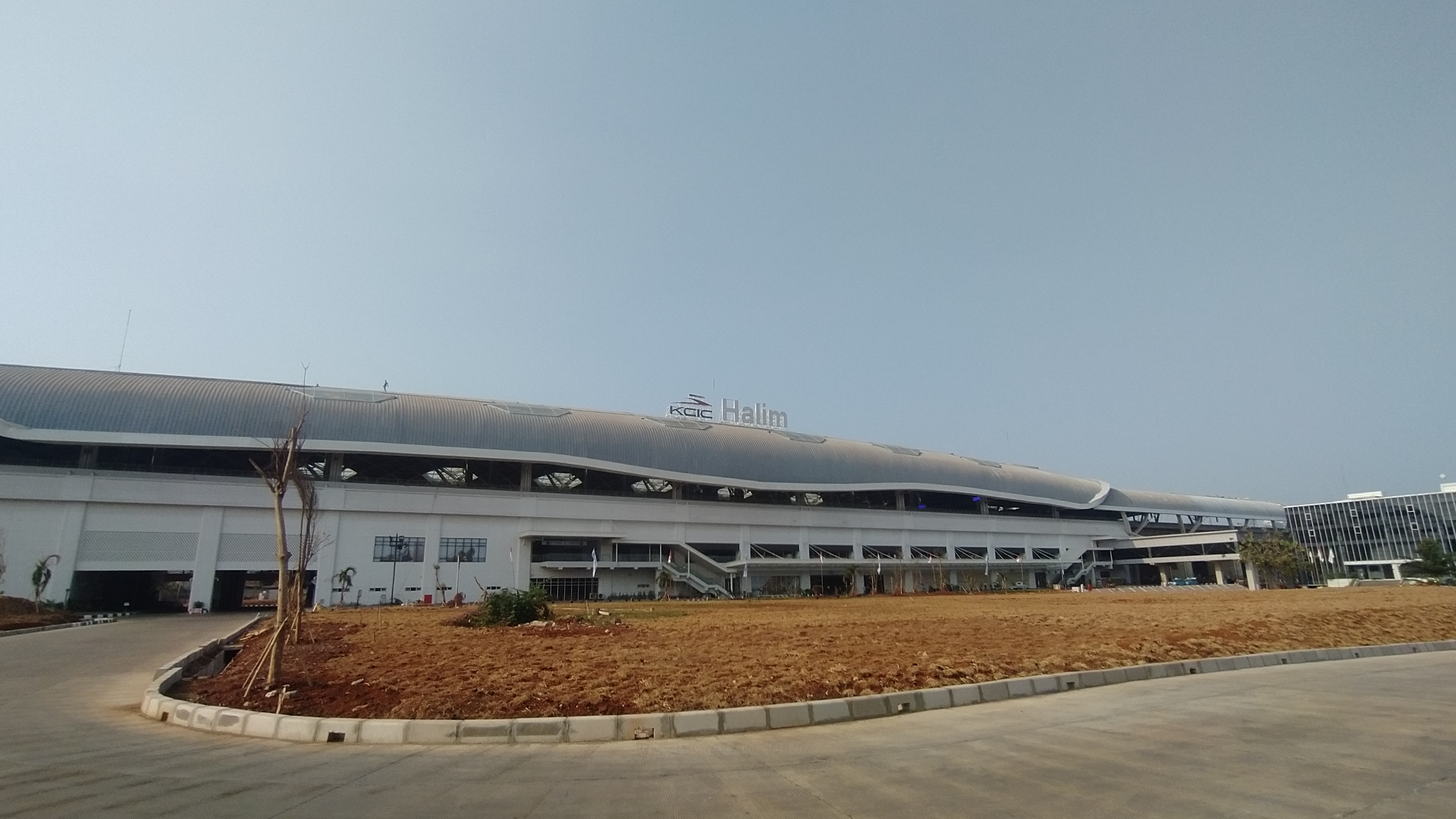
- Halim station complex in Jakarta, where KCIC is headquartered

Overview
- Fleet: 11 trains
- Locale: Java

Technical
- Track gauge: 1,435 mm (4 ft 8 1/2 in) standard gauge
- Electrification: 25 kV 50 Hz AC, (overhead catenary)
- Length: 142.3 kilometres (88.4 mi)
- Operating speed: 350 km/h (220 mph)

Other
- Company
- Type: Private company with consortium ownership
- Founded: 16 October 2015; 10 years ago
- Headquarters: Jakarta, Indonesia
- Owner: Pilar Sinergi BUMN Indonesia (60%); Beijing Yawan HSR (40%)
- Website: kcic.co.id

PT Kereta Cepat Indonesia China (lit. 'Indonesia China High-Speed Railways Limited', abbreviated as KCIC) is an Indonesian transportation company that operates the Indonesian high-speed rail network built on the Jakarta–Bandung route in the Parahyangan megapolitan area.

The company is a joint venture between PT Pilar Sinergi BUMN Indonesia (PSBI) by 60% and Chinese state-owned consortium company Beijing Yawan HSR Co. Ltd. by 40%. PSBI itself is a joint venture of Indonesian state-owned enterprises consists of Kereta Api Indonesia (51.37%), Wijaya Karya (39.12%), Jasa Marga (8.3%), and Perkebunan Nusantara VIII (1.21%). Beijing Yawan HSR Co. Ltd. is also a joint venture, formed by Chinese state-owned enterprises including China Railway Group Limited (42,88%), Sinohydro (30%), CRRC (12%), China Railway Signal & Communication (10.12%), and China Railway International (5%).

== History ==
=== China's bid and the establishment of KCIC ===
In April 2015, the People's Republic of China competed with Japan when the two countries offered their high-speed trains to Indonesia. This competition, according to The Jakarta Post, is part of a geopolitical and economic rivalry between the two countries to gain strategic influence in the Asia-Pacific region. After the project was nearly canceled at the end of September, Indonesia chose China as the winner of this 75 trillion rupiah (US$5 billion) project.

On 2 October 2015, PT Pilar Sinergi BUMN Indonesia (PSBI) was formed as a consortium of four state-owned enterprises involved in the high-speed train development process namely: Kereta Api Indonesia, Wijaya Karya, PTPN VIII, and Jasa Marga. On 6 October, the formation of the consortium was reported to the Financial Services Authority, and President Joko Widodo passed Presidential Regulation (Perpres) No. 107 of 2015 on the Acceleration of Implementation of High-Speed Train Infrastructure and Facilities between Jakarta and Bandung. The company will invest in a joint venture.

The joint venture is called PT Kereta Api Indonesia China, with 60% ownership of PSBI and 40% of China Railway International Company Limited. The company was formed on 16 October 2015 and is planned to prioritise commercialisation, not burden the state budget, and promote synergies between businesses. Responding to this new partnership, Japanese Prime Minister Yoshihide Suga stated he "deeply regretted" and "difficult to understand" Indonesia's choice. However, BUMN Minister Rini Soemarno said that China's financial structure was considered more profitable because China's proposal did not require guarantees and funding from the Indonesian government.

=== Construction ===
Proposed high-speed railway in Java, Indonesia

To start construction, Joko Widodo (Jokowi) passed Presidential Regulation no. 3 of 2016 as a National Strategic Project. On 21 January 2016, Jokowi laid the first stone for construction in the Walini Tea Plantation area owned by PTPN VIII. The estimated financing for the construction process reaches IDR 70 trillion.

In 2017, in the capital of China, Beijing, a Facility Agreement for Infrastructure Financing and Fast Train Facilities was signed, which was personally witnessed by President of Indonesia Joko Widodo and General Secretary of the Chinese Communist Party Xi Jinping. Budi Karya Sumadi as the Minister of Transportation reminded construction contractor companies to immediately speed up the construction process. According to him, land acquisition is a problem of hampering infrastructure development, and he does not require that land acquisition be completed 100%. Nevertheless, land acquisition is still a prerequisite that must be met so that the loan provided by the China Development Bank can be disbursed immediately.

The established route is the Jakarta-Bandung route of 142.3 km, and is supported by four stations namely Halim, Karawang, Walini and Tegalluar. Each station will be equipped with facilities to support transit-oriented development (TOD) around the station. Regarding the plan for this new station, Walini will be projected as a new planned city that will become a buffer for the Greater Bandung area. This project is projected to absorb 39,000 workers during the construction process, 20,000 workers during the TOD construction process, and 28,000 workers after operation. To support operations, KCIC will present 11 sets of fast trains with 8 railway carriage per trains.

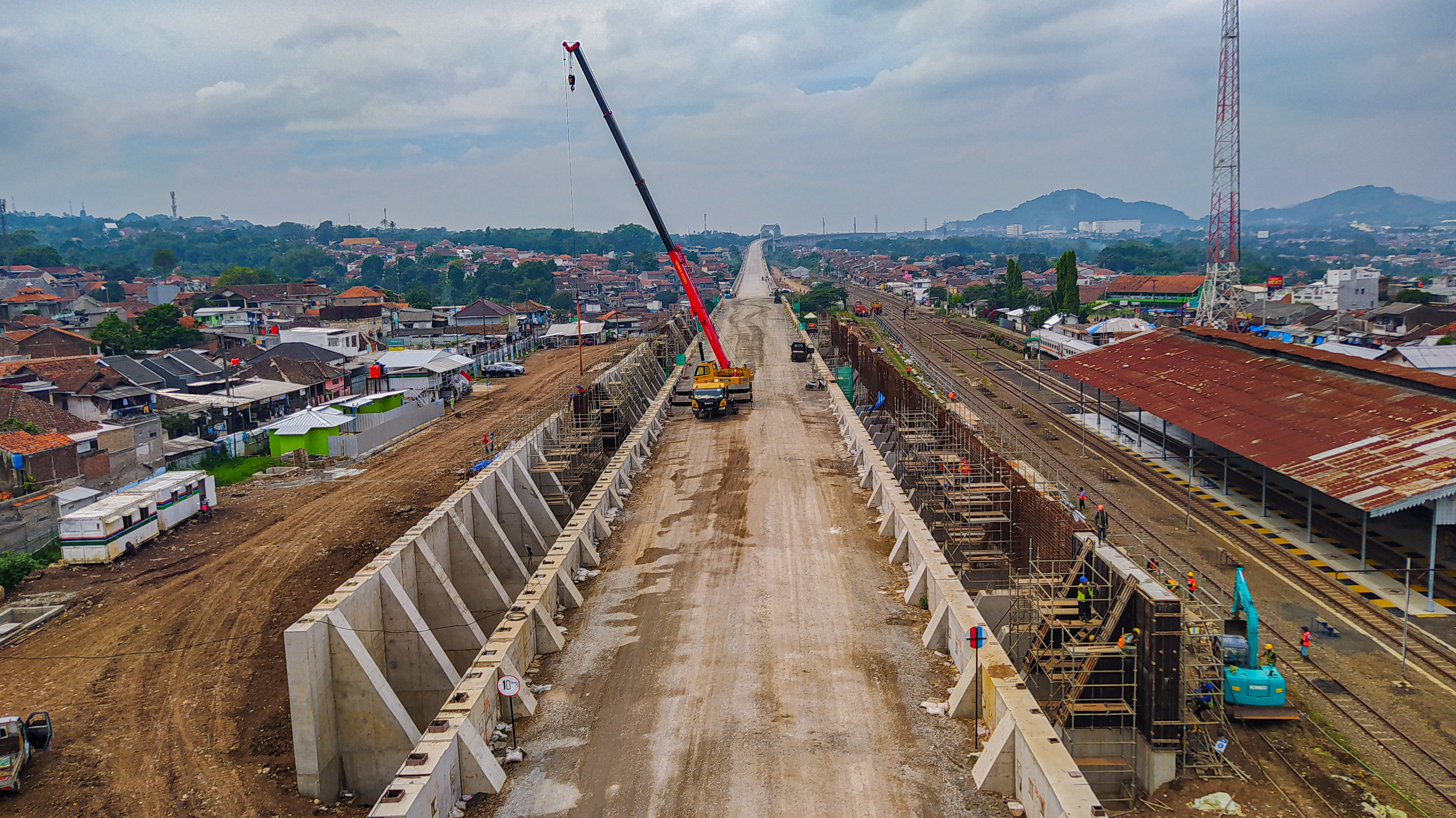
The construction process of the HSR station across from Padalarang Station

This project does not always run smoothly. The estimated cost set by KCIC was originally around US$6.1 billion, but in November 2020, KCIC estimated that there would be an increase to US$8.6 billion, and management was able to reduce costs to US$8 billion. The BUMN (State-owned enterprise) Ministry said that this cost overrun would be covered with funding from a consortium of shareholders and loans. The consortium will bear the 25% cost overrun originating from the state's capital participation that goes into PT Kereta Api Indonesia in the amount of IDR 4 trillion and China will lose IDR 3 trillion. The remaining 75% comes from loans.

On 18 October 2021, KCIC stated that Walini Station, which was originally included in their list of stations, was removed from the list of stations, due to cost efficiency. Therefore, they will choose to shift the station to Padalarang for modal integration reasons.

On 18 May 2023, KCIC officially started the first trial of the Jakarta-Bandung high-speed rail line. The KCIC line is electrified with a voltage of 27.5 kV AC.

=== Takeover by Ministry of Finance ===
On 5 August 2026, Minister of Finance Purbaya Yudhi Sadhewa disclosed a plan by the ministry to take over 60% of shares of KCIC, which are currently held by Indonesian state enterprises. At the time most of the participating state enterprises were owned by the state sovereign wealth fund Danantara. A 'special mission vehicle' owned by Ministry of Finance would hold the shares after the conclusion of the transaction, which he predicted be concluded by September 2026. The future role of PT PSBI after the takeover, which before was the previous investment vehicle owned by the state enterprises, remained unclear. However, it was expected that as the consequence of the transaction Kereta Api Indonesia who was by 2026 the majority shareholder of PSBI consortium would be relieved of the ultimate ownership of KCIC.

== Infrastructure ==
=== Track ===
On 6 May 2016, the then KCIC President Director, Hanggoro Budi Wiryawan, determined the Jakarta-Bandung route for the KCIC line. According to him, the route has sufficient purchasing power, making it very likely that high-speed train tickets will be sold. Wiryawan noted that Bandung has considerable potential for development in the trade and tourism sectors. With this determination of the route, KCIC's business will not only rely on its high-speed rail but also focus on the development of areas surrounding the stations that KCIC will serve.

This line is supported by 13 tunnels and was built using elevated construction with a length of 60% of the total track length (142.3 km). The rest use at grade, especially for the segments that will go through the tunnel until they finally arrive in Bandung.

The Jakarta–Bandung high-speed rail line (KCJB) has a track width of 1,435 mm (4 ft 8 1/2 in) and was initially powered by 25 kV AC overhead power. This line has been doubled since its construction for the first time. During the trial process on May 18, 2023, the electric voltage was changed to 27.5 kV AC. Four LAA traction substations are located in Halim, Karawang, Walini, and Tegalluar.

=== Station ===
Station	Transfers	Location	
Halim	Halim; Halim Perdanakusuma International Airport; 7W Metrotrans City Bus to Cawang Sentral	East Jakarta	Jakarta
Karawang	Shuttle Busses	Karawang Regency	West Java
Padalarang	Greater Bandung Line Commuter Line; Garut Commuter Line; HSR Feeder service to Bandung Station; Intercity trains; 2D Trans Jabar City Bus	West Bandung Regency	West Java
Tegalluar	Shuttle Busses	Bandung Regency	West Java

== Rolling stock fleet ==
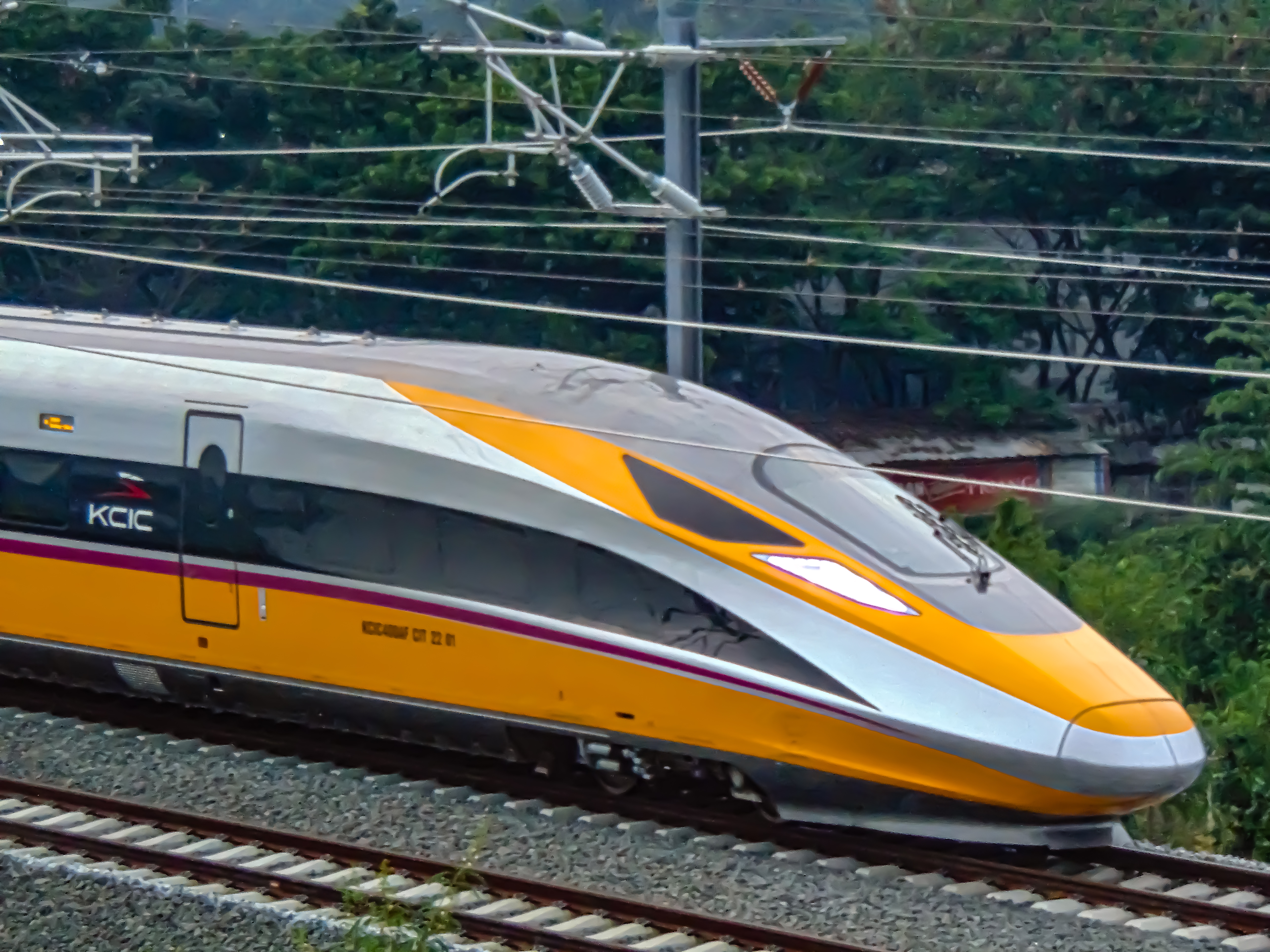
Inspection train KCIC400AF CIT 22 01 while undergoing trials at KCIC Jakarta-Bandung line

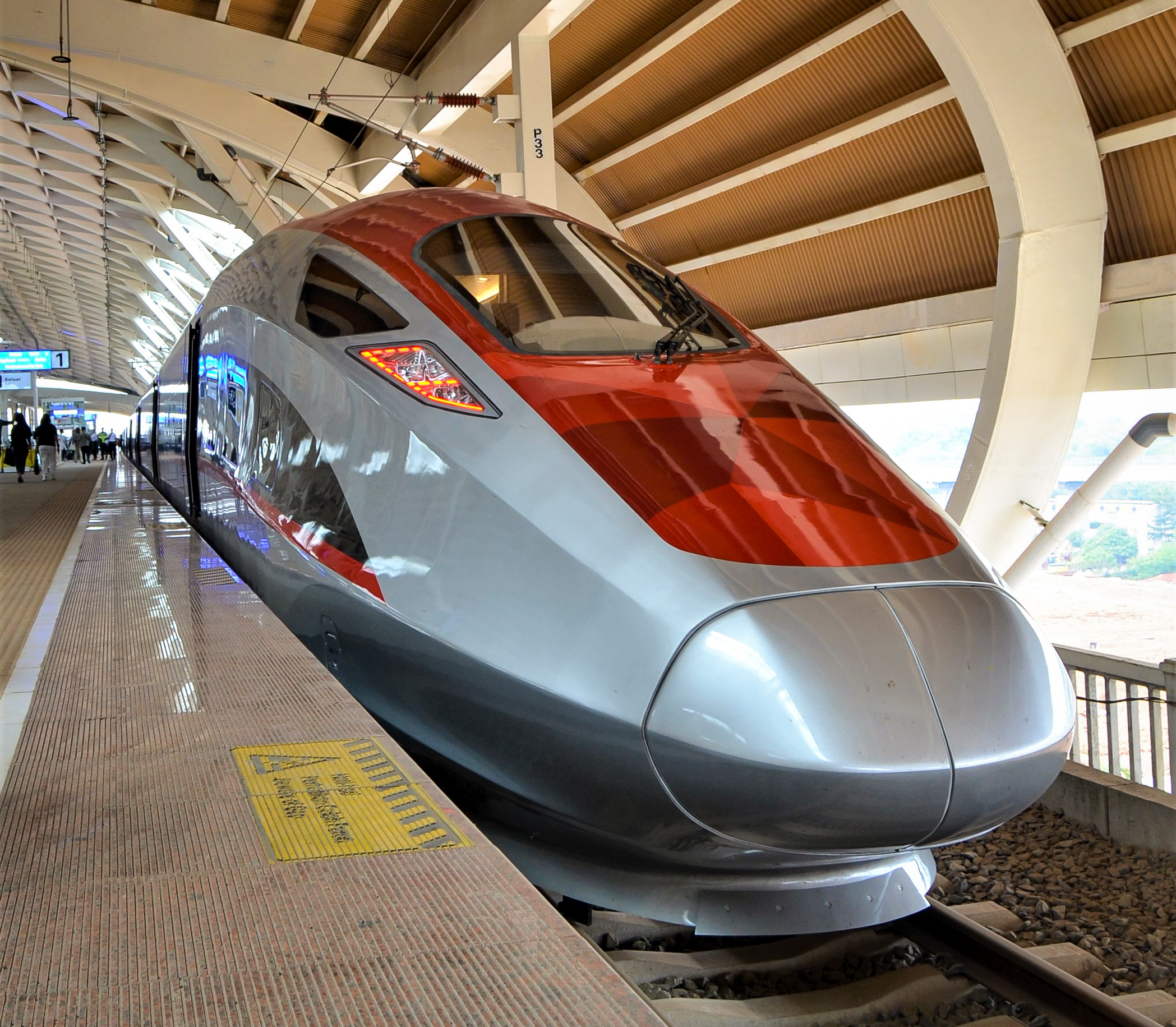
KCIC400AF at Halim station

In 2022, CRRC Qingdao Sifang, Co. Ltd. launched the electric multiple unit for KCIC. The train, which was based on the CR400AF/Fuxing design, was given the KCIC400AF designation and could run up to 350 km/h. With this speed it reaches Padalarang station in Bandung in about 30 minutes and Tegalluar in about 45 minutes. The base is adapted according to the climatic and geographical conditions of Java island and will present interior design with Indonesian nuances such as komodo dragon, batik and Borobudur. The series of high-speed trains are designed to be minimal in noise and vibration, resistant to fire, floods and earthquakes, as well as being resistant to attack by foreign objects. The train are named "Komodo Merah" (lit. 'red komodo dragon') or "Petir Merah" (lit. 'red lightning').

Apart from operating 11 high-speed train sets, KCIC also operates one inspection train. Fleet deliveries start in August 2022 and are scheduled to arrive in Indonesia at the end of August. The DF4B Diesel Electric Locomotive was also brought in to support this project. This locomotive belonged to China Railway, and was sent back to China on 19 September 2023.

== Services and ticketing ==
As of 1 February 2025, KCIC operates 62 services per day, with 31 trains starting from Halim in Jakarta and 31 from Tegalluar in Bandung. The earliest train departs at 06:25 from Halim and 06:05 from Tegalluar, while the last train leaves at 21:25 from Halim and 21:05 from Tegalluar. A train also stops at Karawang station every hour, which is otherwise skipped.

The trains are categorized into three classes: First Class, Business Class, and Economy Class. First Class and Business Class tickets have fixed prices of IDR 600,000 and IDR 450,000, respectively, while Economy Class employs variable pricing, set between IDR 250,000 and IDR 350,000.

First Class offers additional services such as extra-wide seats in a 1-2 configuration, maximum legroom, and a complimentary snack box. Additionally, First Class provides an exclusive seating area on the feeder train from Padalarang to Bandung. Business Class also features wider seating in a 2-2 configuration with extra legroom. Economy Class includes a 3-2 seating configuration. All classes are equipped with reclinable seats and power sockets to charge phones and laptops.

The trains further come with one restoration wagon, where passengers can buy snacks, meals and drinks on board. Toilets are also available on the train.

== See also ==
- High-speed railway in Indonesia
- Kereta Api Indonesia
