= List of INKA rolling stock =

INKA produces a variety of rolling stock from locomotives to passenger and freight wagons. This list explains in more detail the various rolling stock of INKA produces as of 2025. All rolling stock are for the 1.067 mm gauge, also known as the Cape gauge, unless otherwise stated in the description.

== Locomotives ==
Name	Image	Type	Power (hp)	Max Operational Speed (km/h)	Description	Notes
CC203	Inka CC203	Diesel Electric Locomotive	2150	120	A modified variant of the GE U20C, which includes a hood shaped cabin for more aerodynamics and better sight of tracks and signals.	
CC300	Inka CC300	Diesel Hydraulic Locomotive	2500	120	First mainline locomotive wholly produced and developed in Indonesia. It is capable to operate in flood waters up to 1 meter deep.	

== Multiple units ==
Diesel Multiple Units
Name	Image	Cars per set	Max Operational Speed (km/h)	Capacity per set	Description	Notes
KRDE MH102	KRDI KA Jenggala	2,4	100	2 set configuration 88 passengers	Also known locally as the KRDI (Kereta Rel Diesel Indonesia) lit. 'Indonesian Diesel Train'. Operates in East Java.	
KRDE MH102	KRDI KA Jenggala	2,4	100	4 set configuration: 178 passengers	Also known locally as the KRDI (Kereta Rel Diesel Indonesia) lit. 'Indonesian Diesel Train'. Operates in East Java.	
KRDE ME204	INKA ME204 DEMU	4	100	200 passengers	Usually operates as an airport train for Yogyakarta, Solo and Padang. Also used as a feeder train serving for the high speed rail in Bandung. The feeder train has a maximum operational speed of 120 km/h.	
KRDE BPKASS	INKA Sulawesi DEMU	3	80	278 passengers	Operates in South Sulawesi. Uses 1.435 mm gauge.	
Batara Kresna Railbus	Batara Kresna Railbus	3	100	160 passengers	Operates as the Lembah Anai and Batara Kresna railbus.	
Electric Multiple Units
Name	Image	Cars per set	Max Operational Speed (km/h)	Capacity per set	Description	Notes
EA202	EA202 EMU	4,8	100	4 set configuration 800 passengers	Development of the train was financially backed by the KfW (Kreditanstalt für Wiederaufbau), German state owned development and investment bank. Served in Jakarta, but now in the Yogya-Solo Commuterline.	
EA202	EA202 EMU	4,8	100	8 set configuration: 1600 passengers	Development of the train was financially backed by the KfW (Kreditanstalt für Wiederaufbau), German state owned development and investment bank. Served in Jakarta, but now in the Yogya-Solo Commuterline.	
EA203	EA203 EMU	6	100	272 passengers	Used for the Soekarno-Hatta airport railink. Developed together with Bombardier Transportation.	
IE305	IE305 EMU	12	120	3400 passengers	Operates for the Greater Jakarta Commuter line. Will be gradually replacing ageing rollingstock. Developed together with the Japan Transport Engineering Company (J-TREC).	
Palembang LRT	Palembang LRT	3	85	722 passengers	Operates in Palembang since 2018, becoming the first modern light rail system in Indonesia.	
Jabodebek LRT	Jabodebek LRT	6	100	1480 passengers	Can operate autonomously. Uses 1.435 mm gauge.	

== Coaches and wagons ==
Passenger Coaches
Name	Image	Max Operational Speed (km/h)	Capacity per Coach (seats)	Description	Notes
K3 Stainless Steel 2nd Generation	INKA SS NG Coach	120	76 passengers	Newest economy class coaches. Comes in a 2-2 seating configuration. Seats can be partially reclinable and turned.	
K3 2016 New Image	Economy New image INKA train carriage	100	106 passengers	Economy class coach that comes in a 2-2 seating configuration. First types of economic class train to use more ergonomic seating, compared to previous economic train classes, which used upright seatbacks.	
K3 2017 Premium Economy	Premium economy train carriage by INKA	100	80 passengers	Premium economy class coach that comes in a 2-2 seating configuration.	
K1 Stainless Steel 2nd Generation	Inka executive SS NG Coach	120	50 passengers	Newest executive class coach that comes in a 2-2 seating configuration. Seats can be partially reclinable and turned.	
K1 Stainless Steel 1st Generation		120	50 passengers	Executive class coach that comes in a 2-2 seating configuration. Includes partially reclinable seats.	
K1 2016 New Image		100	50 passengers	Executive class coach that comes in a 2-2 seating configuration. Includes partially reclinable seats.	
K1 Luxury Sleeper 1st Generation		120	18 passengers	A luxury class coach featuring a 1-1 seating configuration. Includes fully reclining seats.	
K1 Luxury Sleeper 2nd Generation	2nd Generation Sleeper Train	120	26 passengers	A luxury class coach featuring a 1-2 seating configuration. Includes fully reclining seats.	
K1 Luxury Sleeper 3rd Generation	INKA Luxury Coach Gen 3	120	26 passengers	Newest luxury class coach featuring a 1-2 seating configuration. Includes fully reclining seats.	
Freight Wagons
Name	Image	Max Operational Speed (km/h)	Payload Capacity per wagon	Description	Notes
Baggage Wagon	INKA Baggage Wagon operated by Indonesian Railways	100	20 tons	Closed baggage trains that are usually included in intercity train sets or freight train sets. Used to carry freight like mail, parcel packages, and oversized goods.	
PPCW 42 Ton		80	57 tons	Open flat wagon for carrying freight like shipping containers, steel coils, cement sacks, and rails.	
KKBW 45 Ton		80	45 tons	Used for carrying coal and sometimes logs.	
KKBW 50 tons		80	52 tons	Primarily used in Sumatra for carrying coal.	
Well Wagon		80	41 tons	Used for carrying shipping containers.	
ZZOW Wagon		80	38 m^{3}	Used for carrying freight like sand, gravel, coal, and minerals .	
Pulp Wagon		80	50 tons	Closed freight wagon	
Oil Tank Wagon		80	40 tons or 50.6 m^{3}	Primarily used by Pertamina for carrying oil in Sumatra and Java.	

== Specialized vehicle ==
Specialized Trains and Wagons
Type	Image	Self-Propelled	Description	Note
Generator Car		No	Included as one of the wagons of the intercity train sets. Includes a generator with a capacity of 500kVa that can produce up to 500kW of power. This wagon is used for providing power to the passenger coaches.	
Dining Car		No	Often included as one of the wagons of intercity train sets. Here passengers can purchase foods and beverages, hang out at tables and for Muslim passengers, pray in the small prayer room.	
Rescue Car		No	Specialized railway car that is equipped with a medical and mechanical tools to help in evacuation processes.	
Inspection Car	INKA inspection train	Yes	Used for inspecting railway conditions for 1.037 mm gauge railways.	
Inspection Car Sulawesi	Sulawesi inspection and measurement car	Yes	Used for inspecting railway conditions for 1.435 mm gauge railways.	
Track Motor Car	Inka Track Motor Cart	Yes	Used for railway track maintenance. Includes a train that can lift up to 13 tons, and can pull carriages weighting up to 85 tons to carry maintenance equipment.	
Track and Overheard Measurement Car	Track and overhead measurement car by INKA	Yes	Used for measuring track and overhead electrical line conditions. These trains help inform railway management on how to plan maintenance effectively based on defects that are detected along the rail line.	
VIP Car		Yes	A train consisting out of 5 wagons. Used to carry VIP passengers like the President, Ministers or Foreign state officials. The train has facilities like a meeting room, dining car, attendant car, multimedia room, GPS for tracking, and bulletproof glass windows.	

== Export market ==
Locomotives
Name		Image	Type	Power (hp)	Max Operational speed (km/h)	Description	Note
PNR 9000 Class		PNR Modified CC300 INKA locomotive	Diesel Hydraulic Locomotive	2500	120	A Philippine variant of the CC300. Has extra windows on the sides to improve spatial awareness. The locomotive is primarily used to pull the PNR 8300 Class Coaches.	
Diesel Multiple Units							
Name	Cars per Set	Image	Max Operational speed (km/h)			Description	
PNR 8000 Class	3		100			Philippine variant of the ME204 DEMU.	
PNR 8100 Class	4	PNR 8100 class	100			Philippine variant of the ME204 DEMU.	
Passenger Coaches							
Name		Image	Max Operational speed (km/h)			Description	
PNR 8300 Class Coaches			100			Uses long distance style coaches but has a commuter style interior similar to the PNR 8000 and PNR 8100 classes.	
Bangladesh Coaches			120			Built for both 1,676 mm gauge and 1,000 mm gauge railways in Bangladesh.	
