= Research Organization for Energy and Manufacture =

Indonesian research organization

- Organisasi Riset Energi dan Manufaktur (OREM)

Agency overview
- Formed: 1 March 2022
- Preceding agencies: Assessment and Application of Technology Research Organization-BPPT; Engineering Science Research Organization
- Jurisdiction: Indonesia
- Agency executive: Haznan Abimanyu, Head of OREM
- Parent agency: National Research and Innovation Agency

The Research Organization for Energy and Manufacture (Indonesian: Organisasi Riset Energi dan Manufaktur, OREM) is one of Research Organizations under the umbrella of the National Research and Innovation Agency (Badan Riset dan Inovasi Nasional, BRIN). On 24 January 2022, the formation of the agency is announced and to be formed on 1 February 2022. The organization is resulted from restructuration of Assessment and Application of Technology Research Organization-BPPT (Organisasi Riset Pengkajian dan Penerapan Teknologi-BPPT, ORPPT-BPPT) and Engineering Science Research Organization (Organisasi Riset Ilmu Pengetahuan Teknik, ORIPT).

OREM is direct successor of Assessment and Application of Technology Research Organization-BPPT.

== History ==
After acquirement of Agency for the Assessment and Application of Technology (Badan Pengkajian dan Penerapan Teknologi, BPPT), BPPT transformed into ORPPT-BPPT under BRIN in September 2021. As it was from BPPT, ORPPT-BPPT was a big research organization with 16 research center and has very wide range of research focus.

On 24 January 2022, the ORPPT-BPPT is struck out and no longer listed in the BRIN Research Organizations list along with ORIPT, indicating that the organization is being phased out. Research centers under those two research organizations are being reorganized, resulted in formation of OREM itself, Nanotechnology and Material Research Organization (Organisasi Riset Nanoteknologi dan Material, ORNM), and Electronics and Informatics Research Organization (Organisasi Riset Elektronik dan Informatika, OREI).

OREM is formally established by Chairman of BRIN Decree No. 7/2022, backdated from 25 February 2022. OREM formation is finalized on 1 March 2022 and is functional since 4 March 2022 with inauguration of its first head, Haznan Abimanyu.

== Structure ==
As the latest Chairman of BRIN Decree No. 7/2025, The structure of OREM is as follows:

1. Office of the Head of OREM
2. Research Center for Fuel Technologies
3. Research Center for Energy Conversion Technology
4. Research Center for Electricity Technology
5. Research Center for Transportation Technology
6. Research Center for Process Technology
7. Research Center for Production Machine Manufacturing
8. Research Center for Structural Strength Technology
9. Research Center for Hydrodynamics Technology
10. Research Center for Tools Manufacturing
11. Research Center for Industrial Systems and Sustainable Manufacture
12. Research Center for Environmental Technologies and Clean Technologies

== List of heads ==
No.	Head	Took office	Left office	Title
1	Haznan Abimanyu	4 March 2022	Incumbent	Head of OREM
