= INKA Kancil =

Kancil
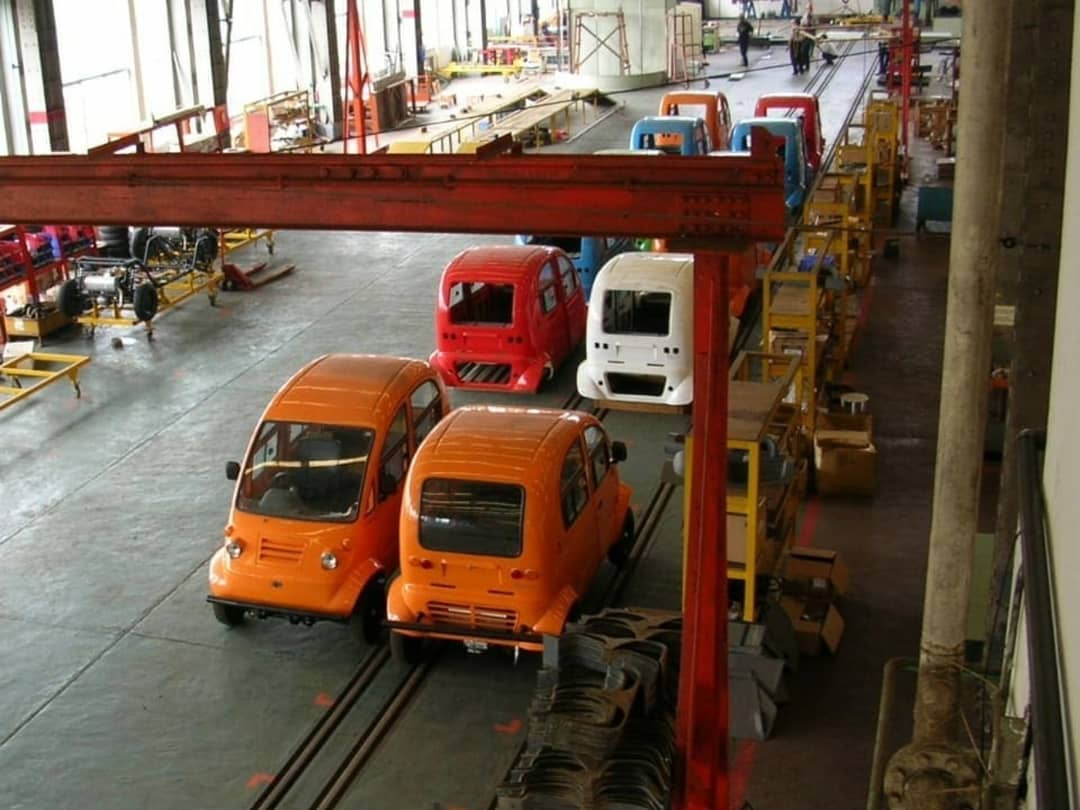
- Kancil in INKA's production line.

Overview
- Manufacturer: PT INKA
- Production: 2011
- Assembly: Madiun, Indonesia

Body and chassis
- Class: micro car or quadricycle
- Body style: 4-door fastback

Powertrain
- Engine: 1 cylinder petrol engine, 404 cc
- Transmission: Manual

Dimensions
- Length: 2.800 mm
- Width: 1.385 mm
- Height: 1.720 mm
- Curb weight: 850 kg

INKA Kancil is an Indonesian car produced by PT INKA. Kancil is an abbreviation of Kendaraan Niaga Cilik Irit Lincah (small, efficient, and agile commercial vehicle), also Indonesian name for chevrotain. It was expected as a replacement for auto rickshaw and bemo because they were not allowed to increase in number or be produced in the Jakarta area. As a type IV environmental transportation vehicle, the Kancil cannot develop its market because Kancil can only replace the existing auto rickshaw. A new Kancil unit can only enter the road if it replaces one auto rickshaw. This means that the buyer of Kancil must also buy 1 piece of auto rickshaw to have its operating license turned off. Because of this rule, Kancil cannot develop quickly, and business owners don't want Kancil to be sold to the public for the use of private passenger vehicles, although it is reported that INKA has produced 40,000 units of this vehicle.

== Design ==
Without pretending to be a national car, the Kancil was planned, designed, and developed by PT Kancil. Several components were developed in collaboration with various domestic and foreign component industries, alongside the Swiss Mechanical Polytechnic (now POLMAN) in Bandung for the front knuckle arm system. The drum brake and wheel hub were jointly developed by PT Bakrie Tosanjaya. Design verification, performance and dynamic analysis, as well as vehicle construction fatigue tests, were conducted at the Inter-University Central Dynamics Laboratory of the Bandung Institute of Technology.

The engine is made by Fuji Heavy Industries, the manufacturer of the Japanese automaker Subaru. Rear Axle is made by Fuji Machinery, also from Japan. Automatic transmission (CVT, Torque Converter) made by Huffco-Comet, USA. While the fiberglass body panels are made by PT. Induro, Tangerang. This body panel was developed from 2 master sample bodies and the first mold made by PT AITEM, a business unit under Indonesian Aerospace. Meanwhile, the styling and master clay models for the body were made by PT Kancil.
