= Industri Kereta Api =

Indonesian state owned rolling stock manufacturer

Coordinates: 7.617604°S 111.523461°E

PT Industri Kereta Api (Persero)

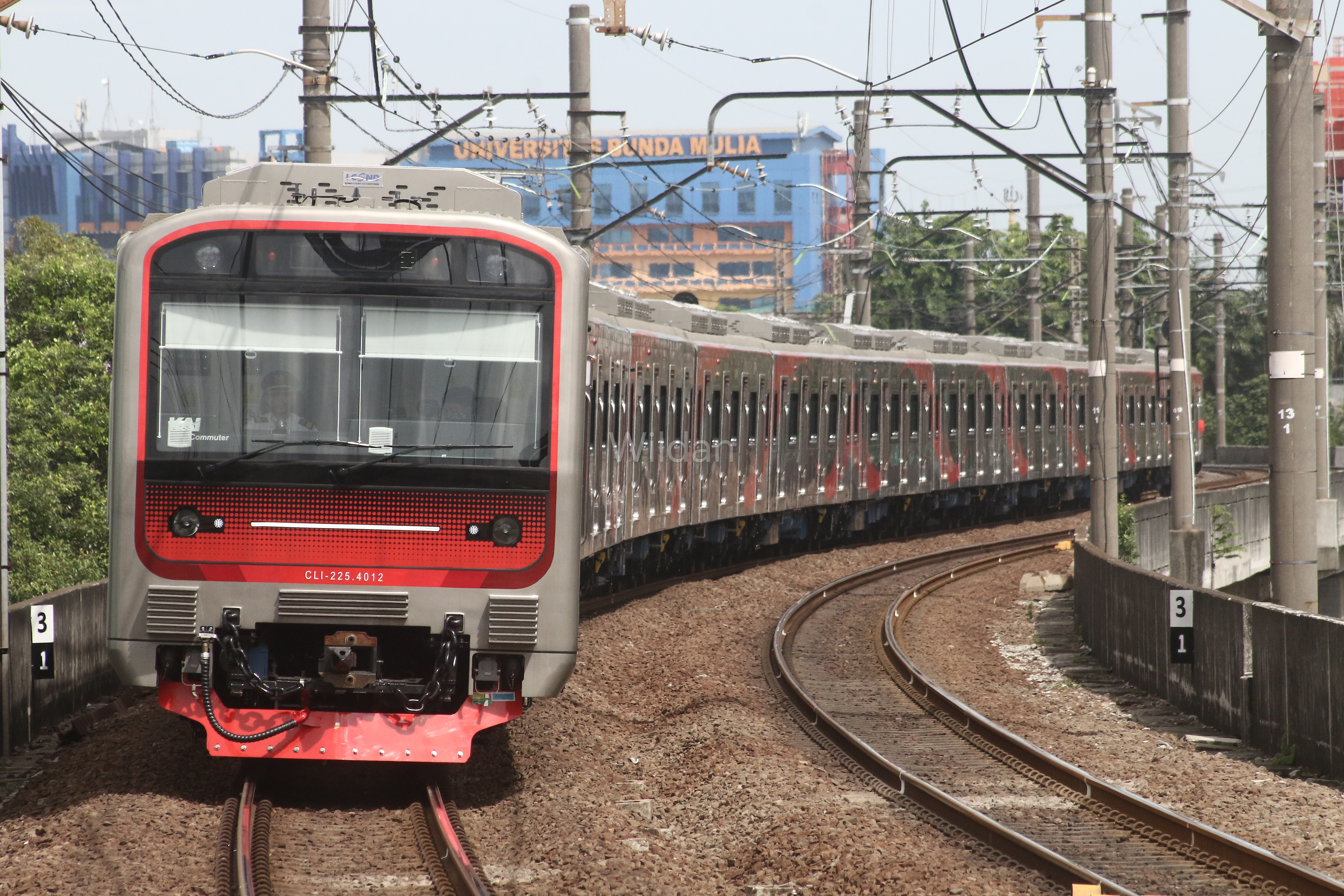
- an INKA iE305 series on the Jakarta Commuter Rail Network.
- Type: State-owned perseroan terbatas
- Industry: Rolling stock
- Predecessor: Balai Yasa Lokomotif Uap Madiun (Madiun Steam Locomotive Workshop)
- Founded: 18 May 1981; 45 years ago
- Headquarters: Madiun, East Java and Banyuwangi, East Java, Indonesia
- Products: Locomotives, Passenger railroad cars, Goods wagons, Special vehicles, DMUs and EMUs
- Services: Production, Maintenance, Refurbishment and Spare parts of trains
- Revenue: ▲ Rp 2.58 trillion (2017)
- Net income: ▲ Rp 75.25 billion (2017)
- Total assets: ▲ Rp 6.04 trillion (2017)
- Owner: Government of Indonesia
- Number of employees: 5,000 (2017)
- Subsidiaries: inkamultisolusi.co.id ptrekaindo.co.id imst.co.id imsservice.co.id imsc.co.id
- Website: inka.co.id

PT Industri Kereta Api (Persero), abbreviated as INKA, is an Indonesian state-owned rolling stock manufacturer it is the largest rolling stock manufacturer headquartered in Southeast Asia. The Indonesian Government holds the majority of shares through Danantara.

They are currently the largest manufacturer of new rolling stock used on intercity railway lines on the islands of Java, Sumatra and Sulawesi. The company was formed after the national strategic plan, under President Suharto called for the formation of a domestic railway manufacturing company.

== History ==
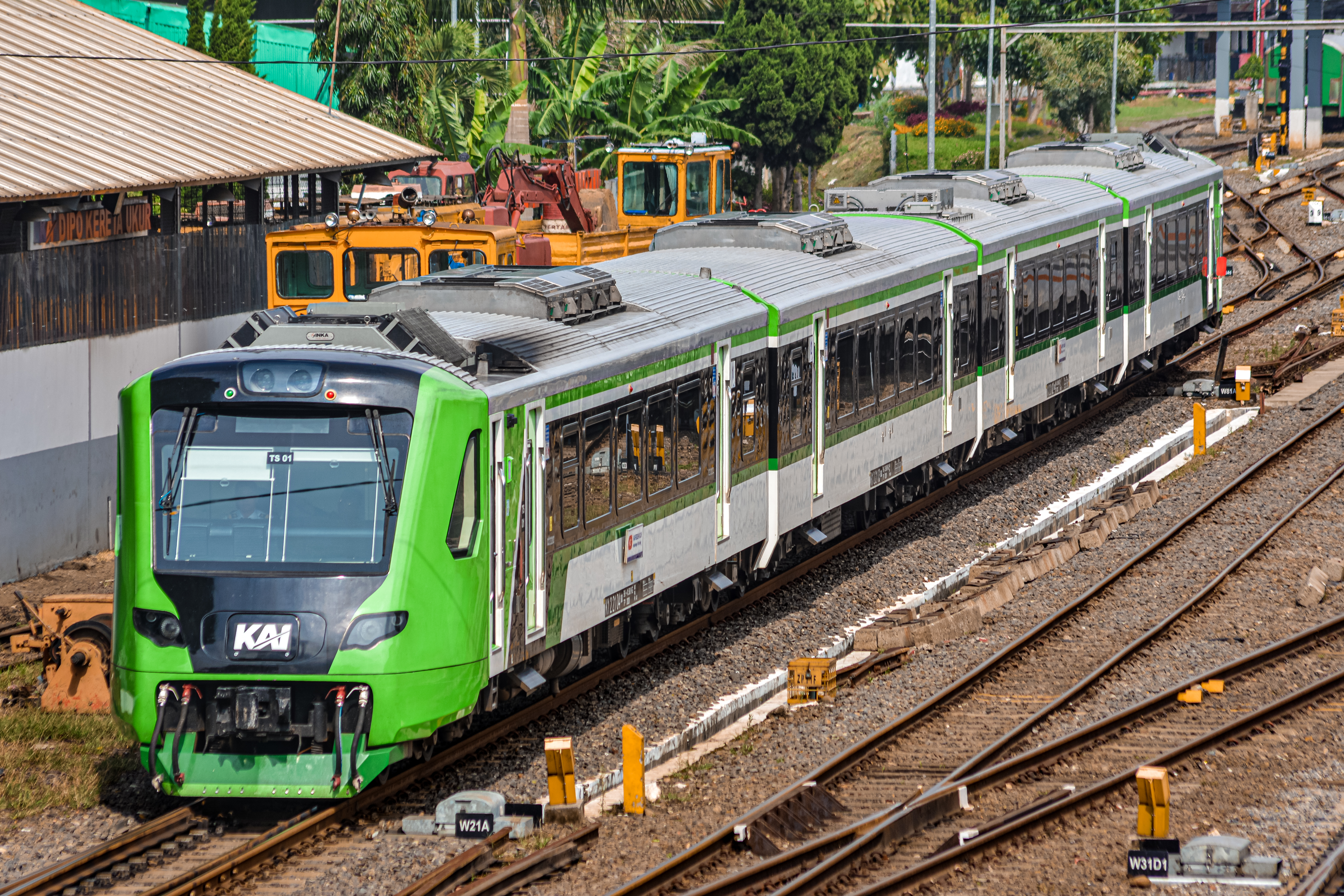
A feeder train for the Jakarta-Bandung High-speed Railway

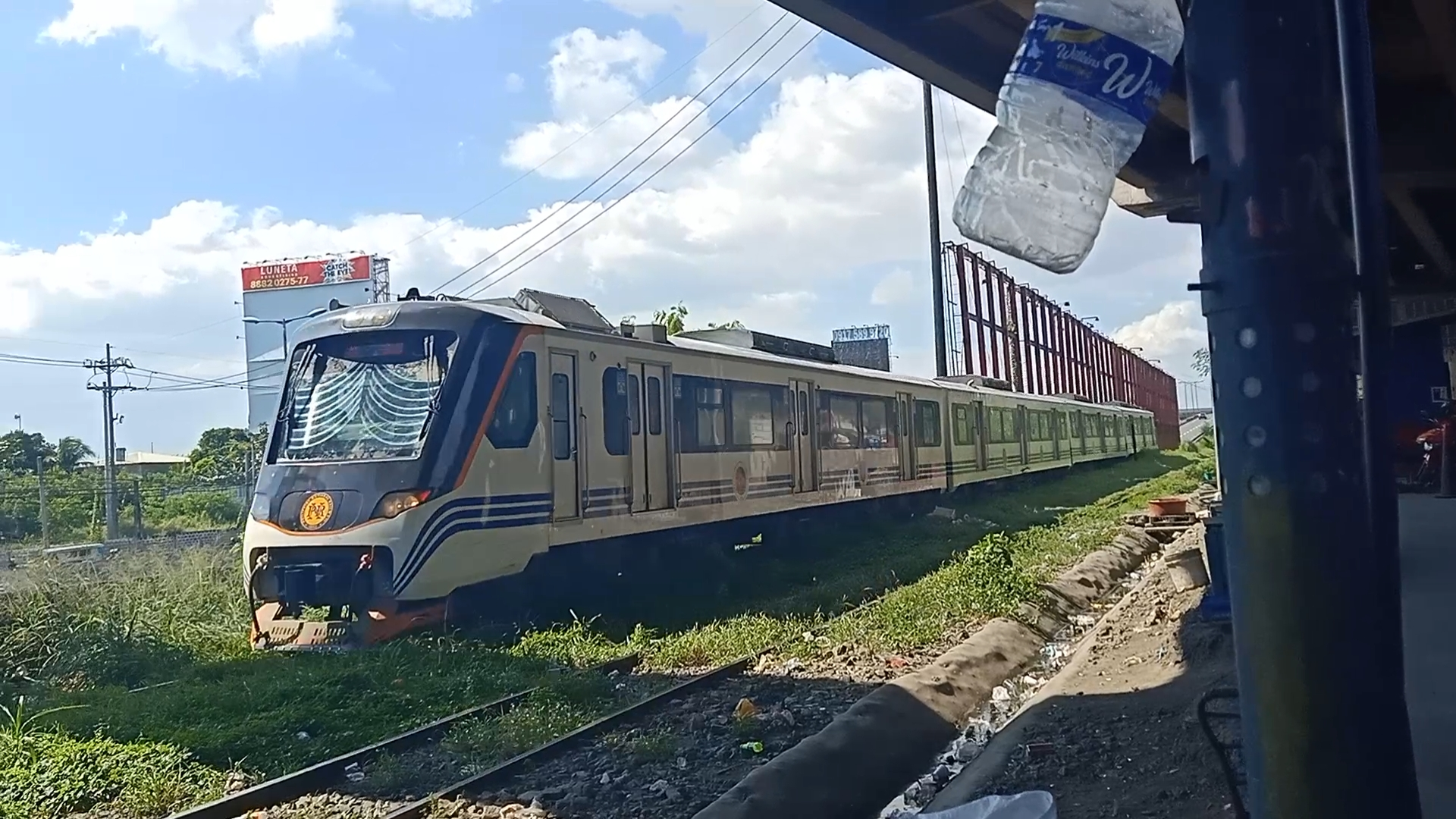
an INKA-made train for the Philippine National Railway

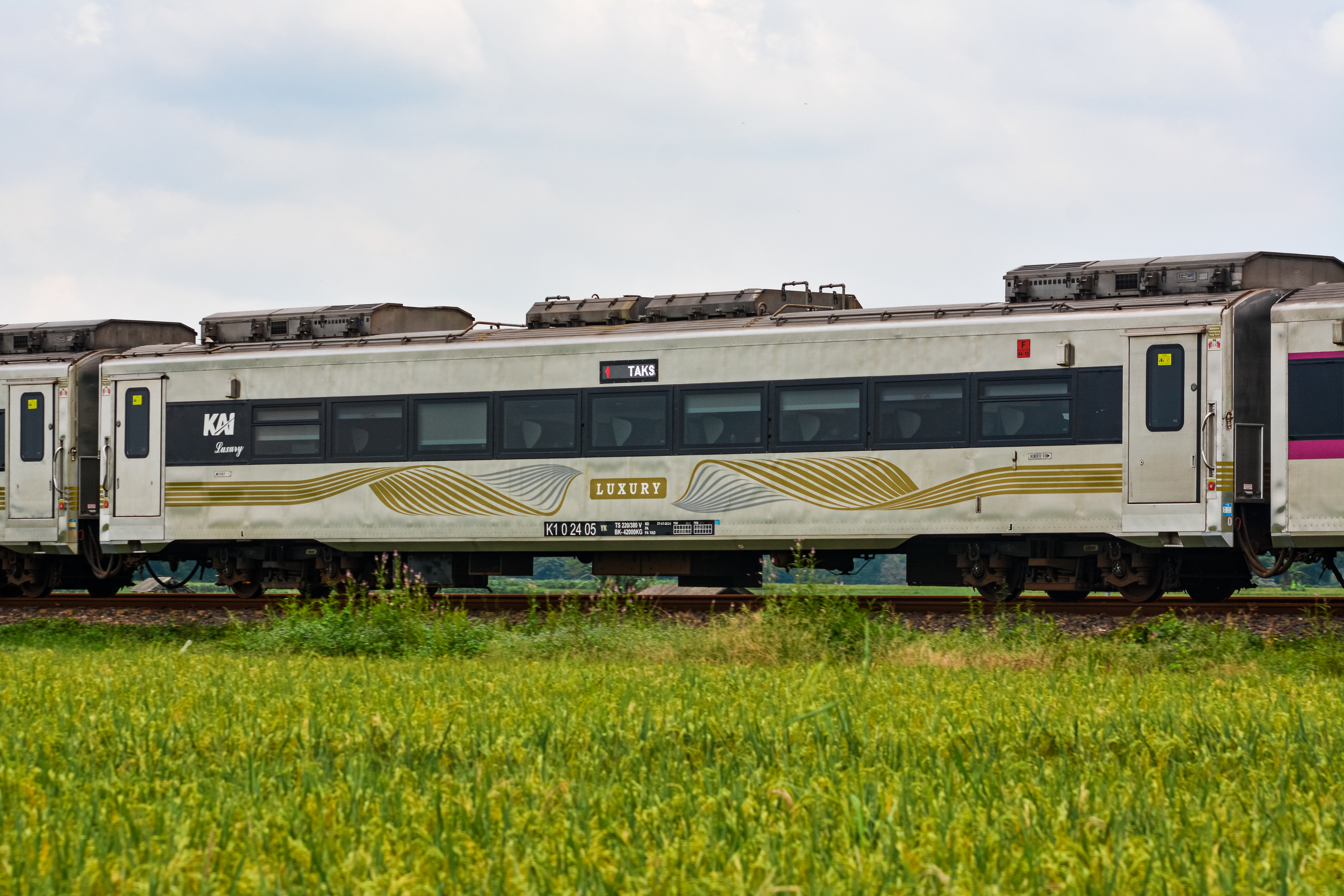
KAI New Generation Passenger Coaches

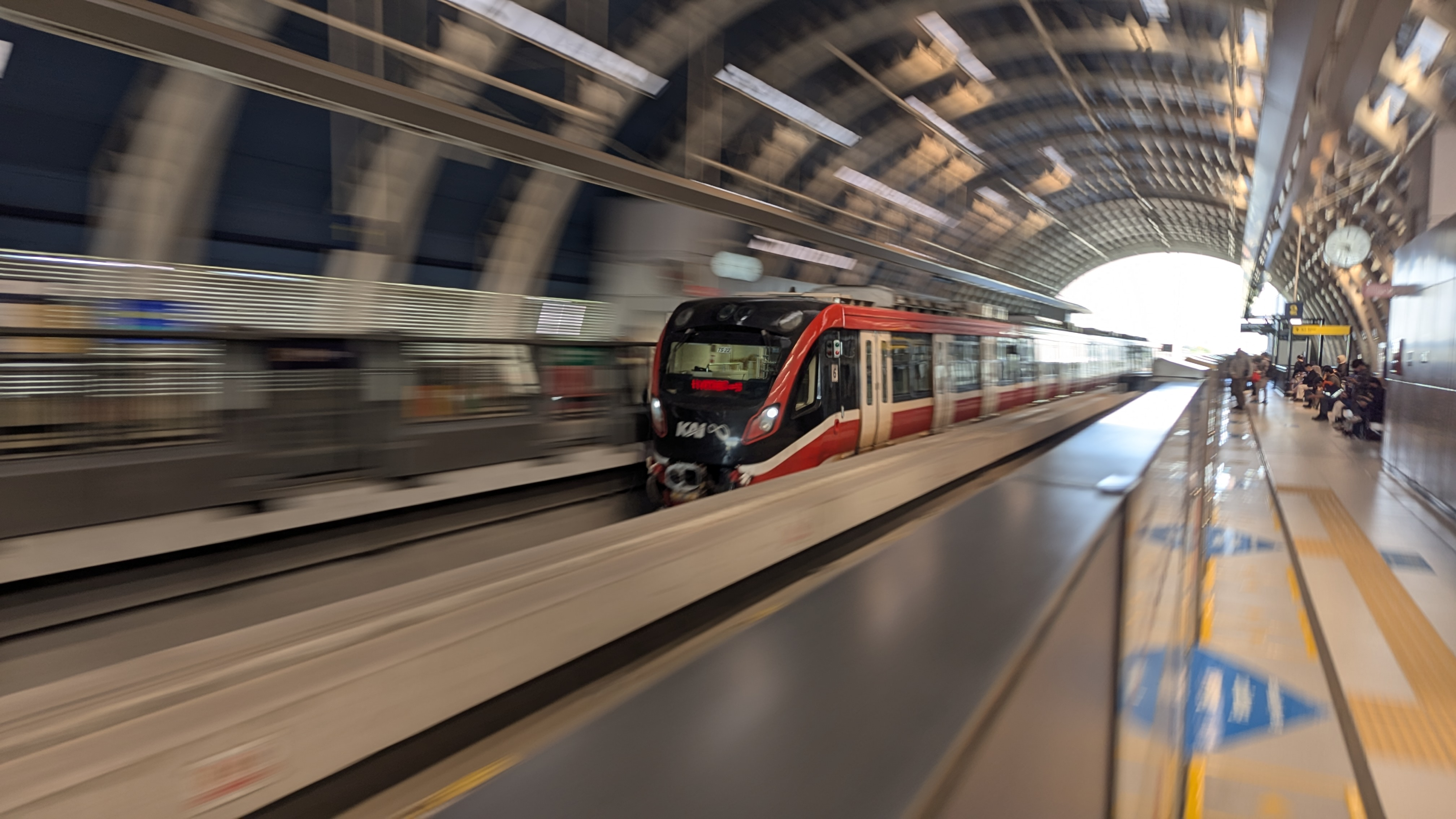
an LRT Jabodebek LRV

PT Industri Kereta Api (Persero) was established by the Indonesian government in May 1981 as the national rolling stock manufacturer, and to take over and convert PJKA’s steam locomotive maintenance depot in Madiun, East Java, into a rolling stock manufacturing plant.

=== Timeline ===
On August 29, 1981, PJKA officially transferred the management of the workshop to the upstart firm. A year later, the company started producing passenger carriages for the KAI network and its Indonesian-made modern freight boxcar.

1985 would see the company manufacturing the first successful air conditioned and non-air conditioned steel economy and executive class passenger cars for KAI.

In 1987, the first-ever Indonesian-built EMU was manufactured by INKA on license with Japanese rail manufacturer Nippon Sharyo, with full production of Indonesian-made EMUs commencing in 1994.

In 1991, for the first time, the company also exported Freight cars to Malaysia.

In 1995, INKA develops two Indonesian long haul express trainsets each for two busy routes of the railway network, one midday train and one long distance overnight service.

In 1996, through a joint venture with General Electric, the company produced locomotives through PT GE Lokomotif Indonesia along with and exporting them to Philippines.

In 1998, INKA, as a show of Indonesian recovery following the economic and political crisis that hit the nation, expanded its export offerings to Thailand with a batch of hopper cars for its railways.

In 2001, the company launched its first-ever Indonesian-built KRL products.

In 2004, the company exported car bodies to Australia.

In 2006, the company exported 50 train cars to Bangladesh.

In 2007, the company signed a production contract for a DMU to be operated in Aceh and Railbus to be operated in Palembang.

In 2015, the company launched a train air conditioning product under the I-COND brand.

In 2016, the company exported 150 train units to Bangladesh

In 2017, the company successfully manufactured train to be operated for the Soekarno-Hatta Airport Raillink.

In 2018, the company launched an LRT to be operated in Palembang.

In 2019, the company successfully completed the production of the first LRT Jabodebek series. The company also launched an electric bus under the brand name E-Inobus.

== Profile ==
PT Industri Kereta Api (Persero) has been a major producer and refurbisher of Kereta Api Indonesia's passenger cars and rolling stock since the 1980s.

INKA began electric multiple unit production in 1987 by assembling Rheostatic EMUs from Japan under license from the Japanese consortium. Along with other advancements, INKA has since adopted stainless steel car bodies for electric multiple units, and more recently for passenger cars.

The company first produced diesel multiple units in 2007 under an order from the Ministry of Transportation for passenger services. INKA has supplied KAI with various freight wagons, notably coal wagons for the coal mining industry in Ombilin (West Sumatra) and South Sumatra.

== Production facilities ==
PT INKA has 2 manufacturing plants, one in Banyuwangi and another in Madiun.

In 2020, INKA and the national railway operator KAI announced that they would be establishing a joint venture with Swiss rolling stock manufacturer Stadler Rail to build a facility for rolling stock crash test and tilt/roll-over test. The facility was to follow the standards of the International Union of Railways (UIC) and be built in Banyuwangi, East Java.

== Products ==
=== Timeline of notable projects ===
INKA produces locomotives, passenger railcars, freight wagons, multiple units and inspection trains. Over the years it has become an important producer of passenger railcars and freight railcars for the Indonesian national railway company, and has exported some of its products to countries such as the Philippines, Bangladesh and New Zealand.

The following is a list of INKA rolling stock projects:

- 1982 – Enclosed boxwagon/car for PJKA
- 1985 – 1985 batch PJKA Economy and Executive class passenger coaches
- 1987 – Rheostatic ED101 EMU, 1987 batch (in cooperation with Japanese consortium led by Nippon Sharyo)
- 1991 – Freight wagons for KTMB
- 1994 – VVVF-GTO EA101 series EMU, in cooperation with BN-Holec
- 1995 – Argo Bromo and Argo Gede trainsets
- 1996 – CC203 locomotive, in cooperation with GE
- 1997 – Argo Bromo Anggrek trainsets
- 1998 – Ballast Hopper wagon for SRT
- 2001 – EA201 series EMU for the KRL Commuterline
- 2002 – Power Car and reefer bogie flat car for KTMB
- 2004 – Container wagon body & blizzard center sills (to Australia)
- 2006 – Bangladesh Railway BG passenger coaches
- 2007 – Kertalaya railbus for South Sumatra provincial government.
- 2008 – MH102 series (Kereta Rel Diesel Indonesia) (for Aceh and Eastern Java)
- 2010 – Economy class AC trainsets for Kemenhub, GE C20EMP locomotives (in cooperation with GE Transportation)
- 2011 – Batara Kresna Railbus and EA202 series EMU
- 2016 – batch KAI executive and economy class coaches and Bangladesh Railway BG and MG coaches
- 2018 – Third rail LRV for Palembang LRT An improved model was produced in 2019 for Jabodebek LRT. EA203 series EMU for Soekarno-Hatta airport rail link
- 2019/20 - 250 carriages for Bangladesh Railway
- 2019 – PNR 8000 class DMU
- 2020 – PNR 8100 class DMU and INKA CC300 DHLs (plus 15 PNR 8300 class coaches) to the Philippines
- 2023 – 133 flat wagons for KiwiRail in New Zealand
- 2025 - iE305 series for KAI Commuter.
- 2026 - Underframe of GE-UGL C44 ESACi

=== Automotive industry ===
In 2008, INKA proposed GEA (short for Gulirkan Energi Alternatif) as a national car. A prototype was created in 2008. In 2009, GEA began using the machinery developed by BPPT, Rusnas, after previously using Chinese machinery. Carburetors are the only imported components in the 2009 prototype.

INKA has supplied compressed natural gas-powered (CNG) buses for TransJakarta, the capital's BRT operator. Their busses are sold under the Inobus brand, an abbreviation of "Innovation Bus". Currently, there are three known product variants:

- Inobus ATC 320 (Articulated Car) (produced year 2011–2012) with Cummins Westport ISL-G 320 HP CNG engine, mated with Voith DIWA 864.3E automatic transmission. 39 units were operated in total, with 21 units operated by Perum DAMRI from 2011 to 2018 and 18 units operated by PT. Bianglala Metropolitan from 2013 to 2016. The main difference between the two is that DAMRI-operated units used Songz Air Conditioning whilst Bianglala-operated units used Denso Air Conditioning.
- Inobus SGL 290 (Single) with Doosan GL11K 290 HP (EPA 2010) CNG Engine, the same engine used in current Zhongtong buses, mated with Allison Transmission T350R automatic. A total of 36 units, should have been operated by Perum PPD.
- Future fleet: Inobus ATC 340 (Articulated Car) with Doosan GL11K 340 HP Euro IV CNG Engine, the same engine used in current Zhongtong buses bus, mated with Voith DIWA 864.5 automatic transmission.

In 2011, INKA produced Kancil, a 404 cc vehicle planned to replace auto-rickshaws. However, it could not develop in his market, because of existing regulations at the time.

In 2022, INKA announced that the two will continue the production of Red and White electric buses after reportedly signing a Cooperation Agreement. The news was announced by ITS Vice Chancellor IV Bambang Pramujati who explained that the two entities will produce five electric buses. He further said that the five electric buses had reached the finishing stage. That way, the Red and White electric bus is ready to be launched in the near future. After that the electric Bus has converted to Trans Metro Pasundan and Trans Semanggi Suroboyo.

== Gallery ==
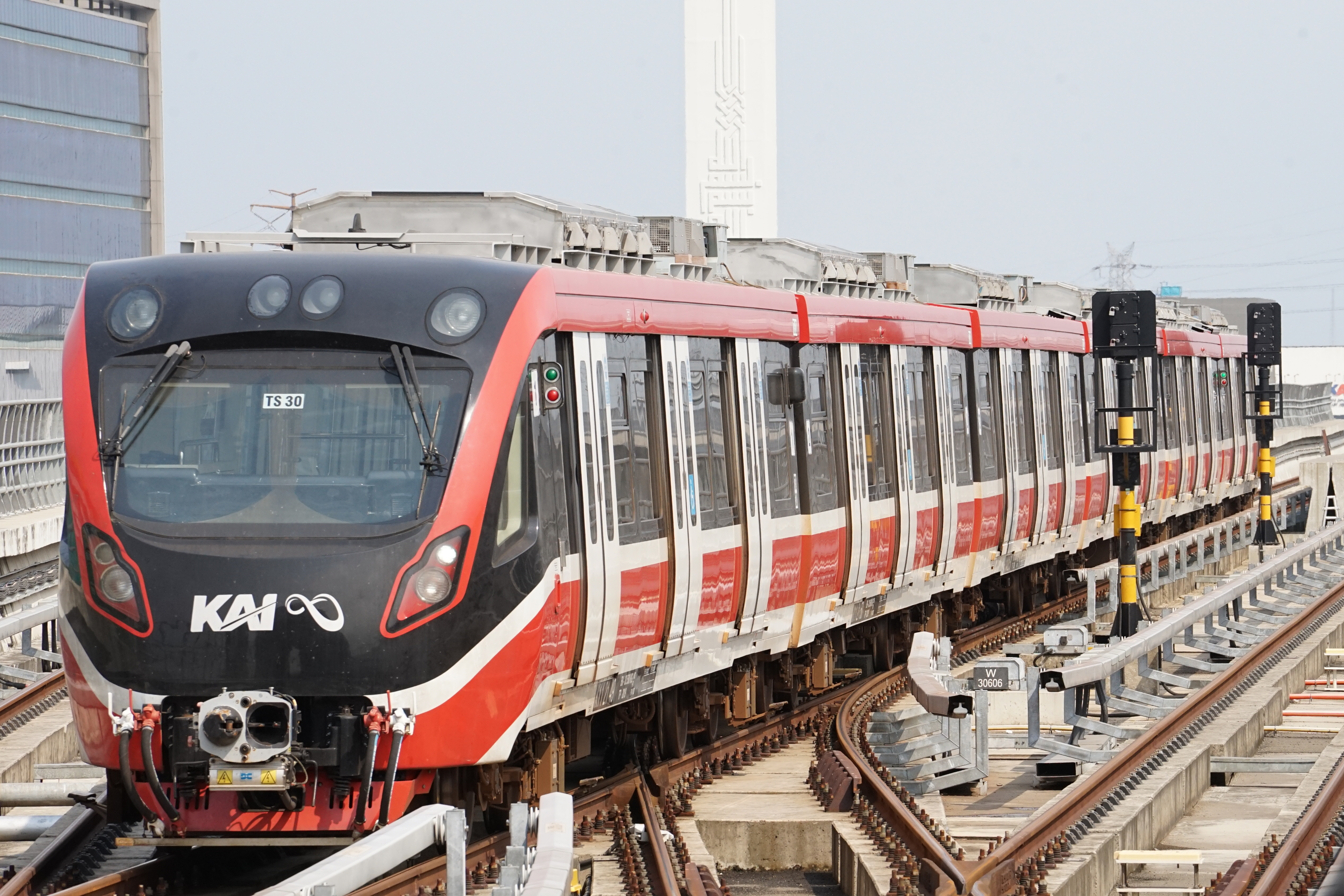
INKA-made Jabodebek LRT rolling stock

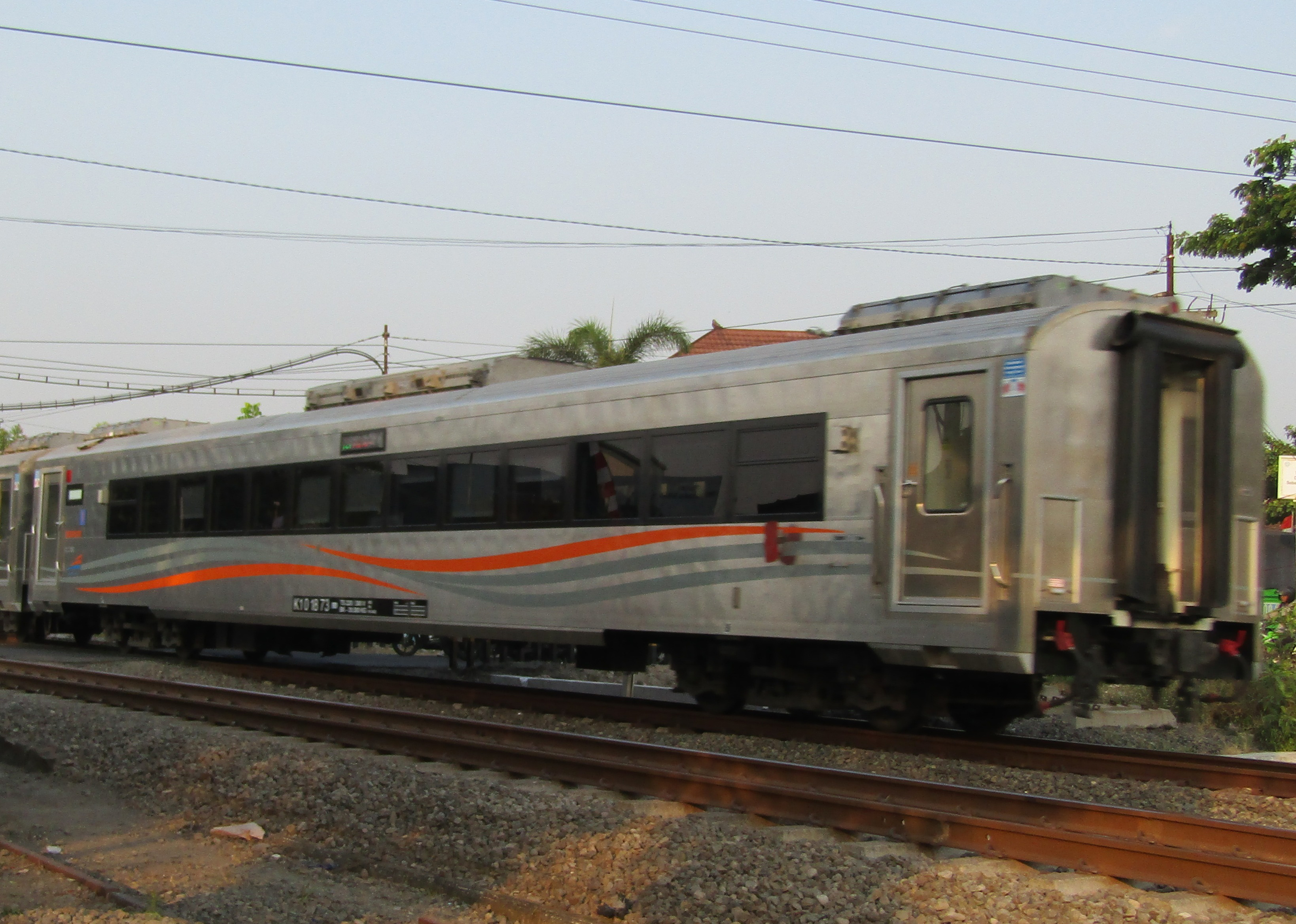
Passenger train using stainless steel metal

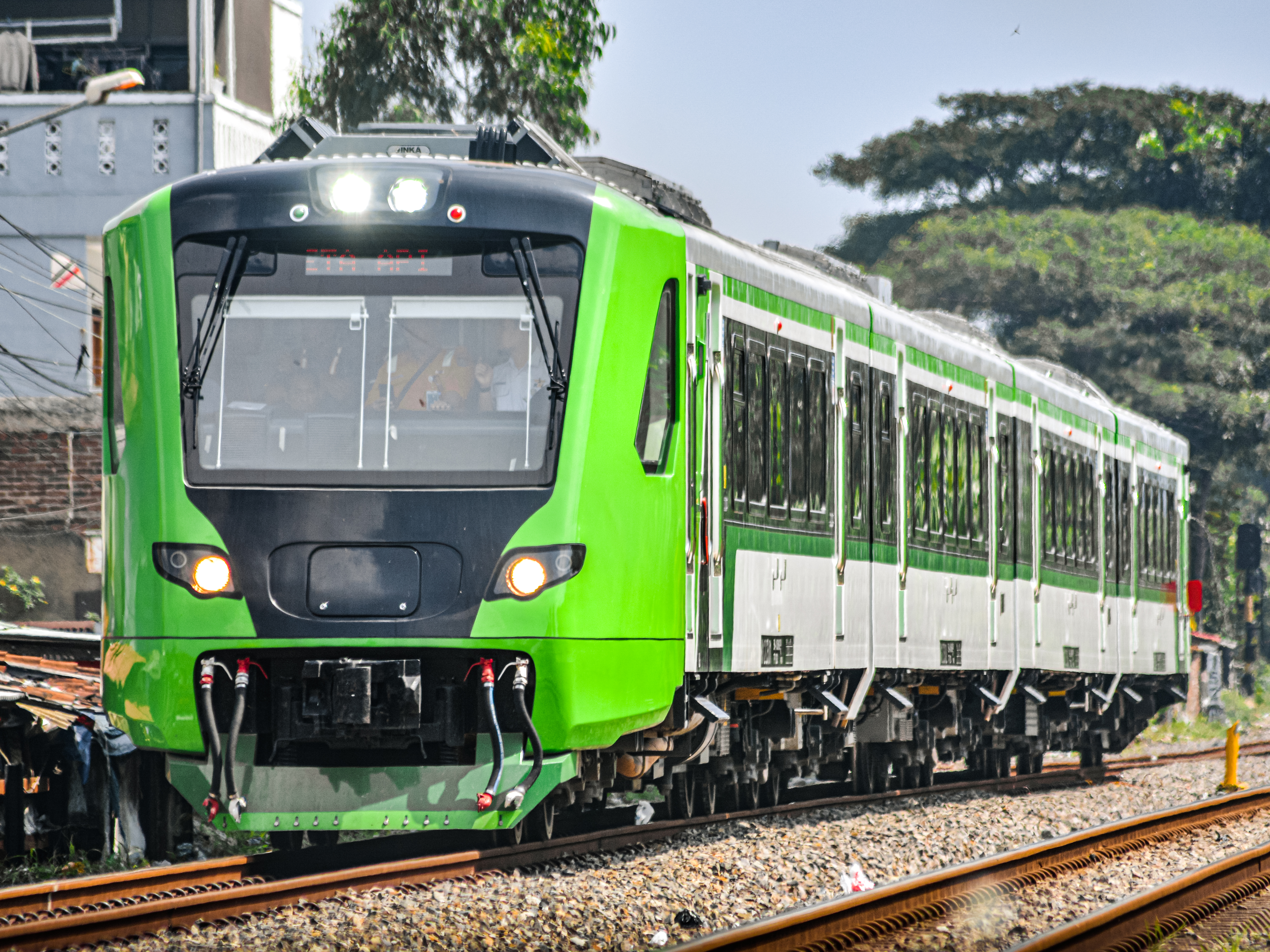
INKA-built DEMU ME204 series for KCJB Feeder Train rolling stock

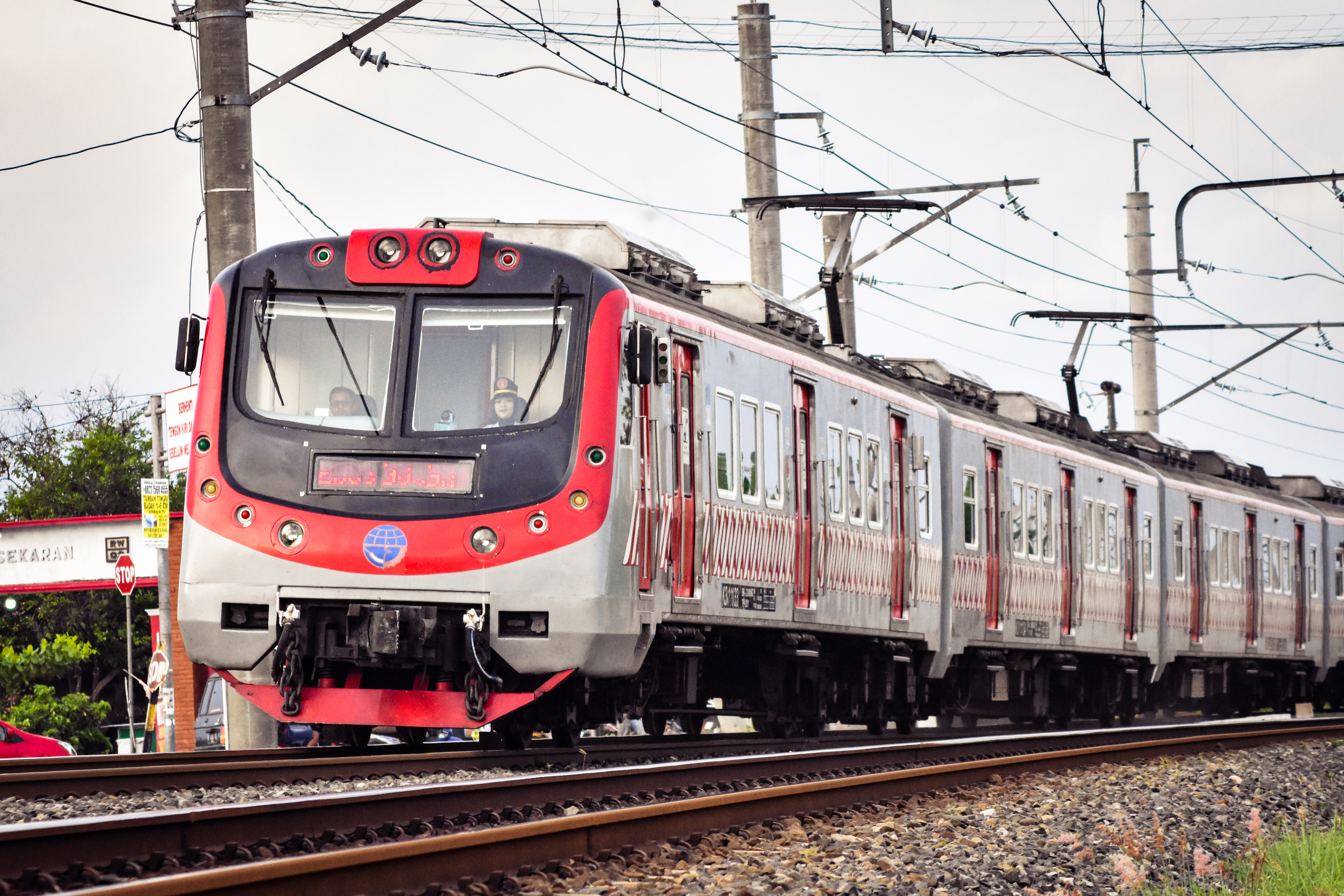
INKA-built EMU EA202 series on the Jogja–Solo Line with the new red livery.

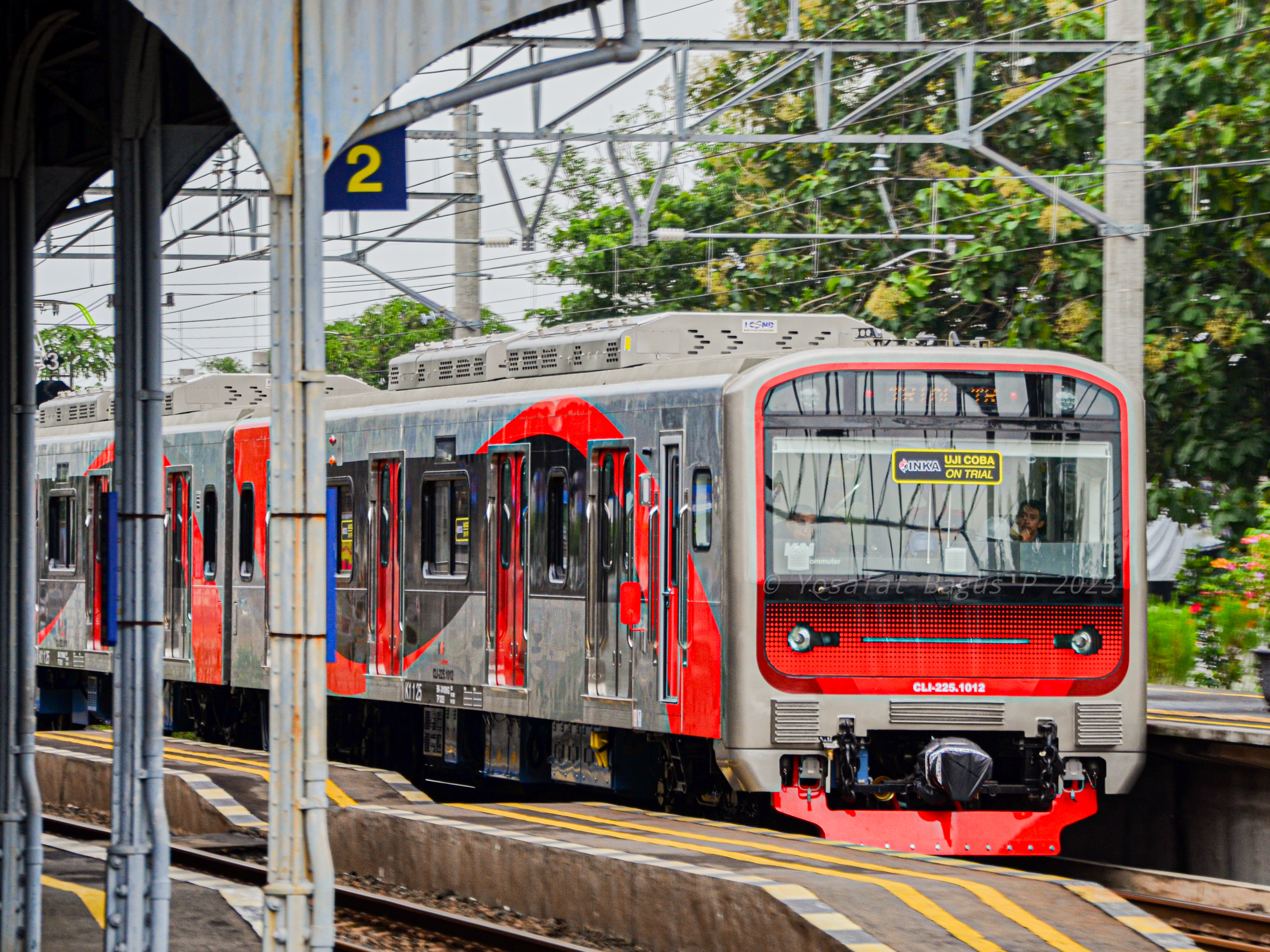
iE305 series during test runs for the Jakarta Commuterline

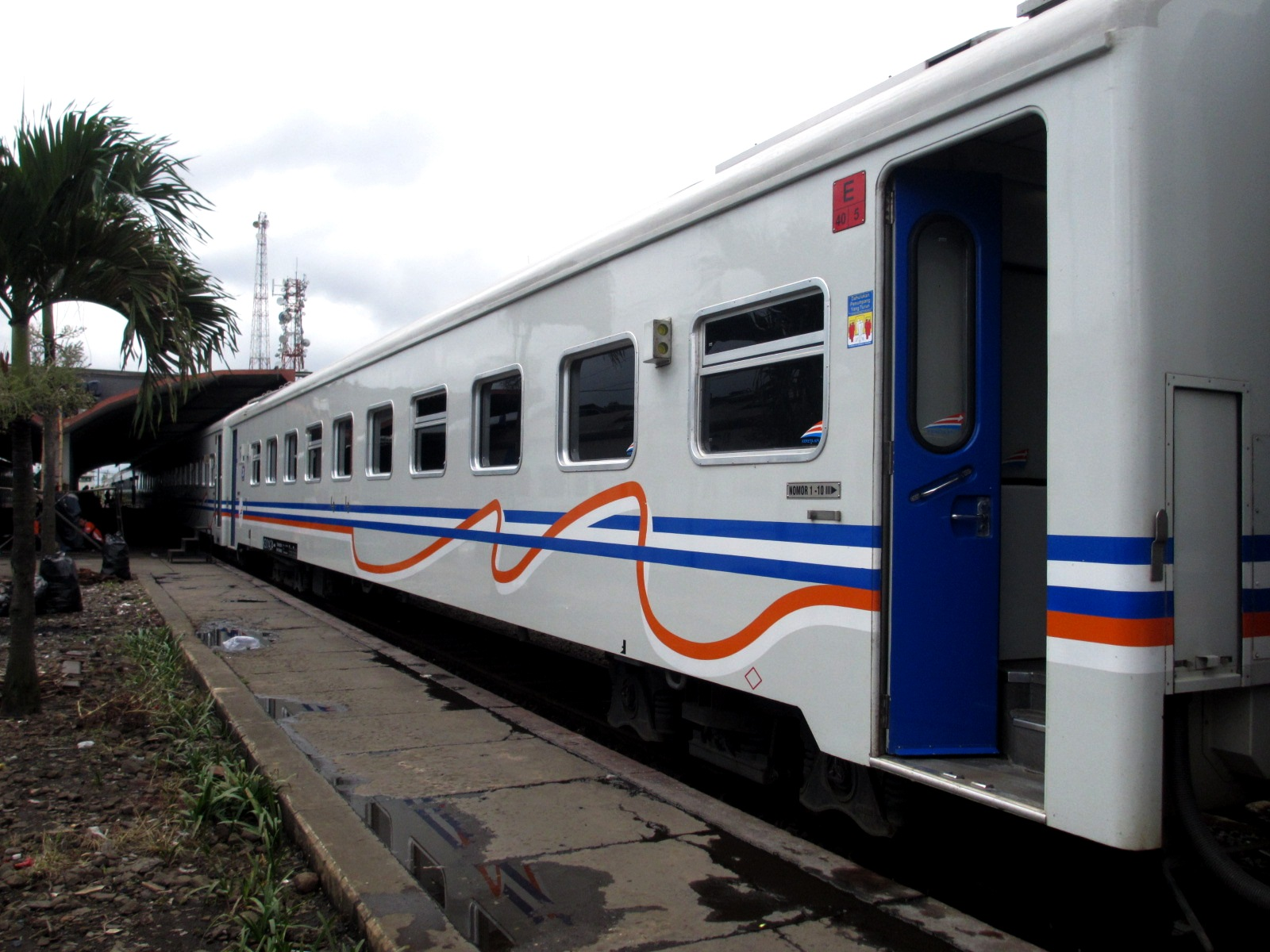
Economy Class
