= EA202 series =

Indonesian train type

EA202 series KfW i9000
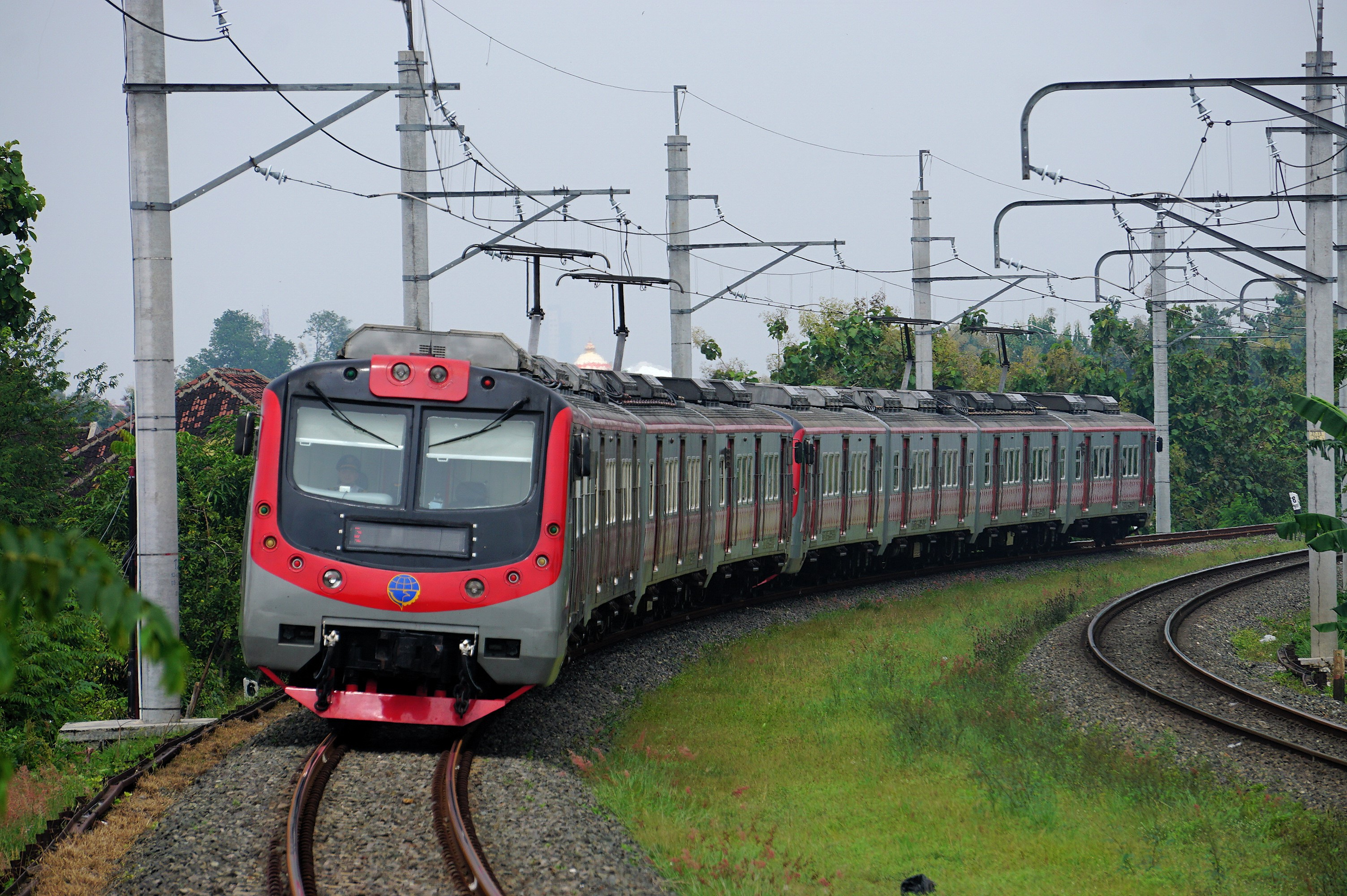
- EA202 series EMU is arriving Palur Station from Yogyakarta Station
- Stock type: Electric multiple unit
- In service: 2013–present
- Manufacturers: Industri Kereta Api; Bombardier Transportation
- Replaced: EA201 series
- Constructed: 2011
- Entered service: 2013
- Refurbished: 2019–2020
- Number built: 10 sets (40 cars)
- Successor: EA203 series
- Formation: 4 cars per trainset
- Fleet numbers: K3 1 11 01–K3 1 11 40
- Capacity: 628 passengers (average)
- Owner: Directorate General of Railways
- Operator: PT Kereta Commuter Indonesia
- Lines served: Former: Jakarta Kota–Bekasi line; Duri–Tangerang line (2013–2014); Tanah Abang–Rangkasbitung line (2015); Jakarta Kota–Tanjung Priok line (2015–2019); Jakarta Kota–Bogor line; Jatinegara–Bogor line; Current: Yogyakarta–Solo line (2020–present)

Specifications
- Car body construction: Stainless steel
- Car length: 20 m (65 ft 7 in)
- Width: 2.99 m (9 ft 10 in)
- Height: 3.82 m (12 ft 6 in)
- Floor height: 1,100 mm (3 ft 7 in)
- Doors: 3 pairs per side
- Wheel diameter: 860 mm (new); 780 mm (worn)
- Wheelbase: Between axles: 2.2 mm (0.087 in); Between bogie centers: 14 m (45 ft 11 in)
- Maximum speed: 100 km/h (62 mph)
- Traction system: Bombardier MITRAC TC1110 IGBT–VVVF
- Traction motors: MJA.280-3 asynchronous 3-phase AC
- Acceleration: 2.88 km/(h⋅s) (1.79 mph/s)
- Deceleration: 3.3 km/(h⋅s) (2.1 mph/s) (normal); 4.3 km/(h⋅s) (2.7 mph/s) (emergency)
- Auxiliaries: Static Inverter (SIV)
- Power supply: OHLE
- HVAC: Konvekta (before refurbishment); INKA I-Cond (after refurbishment)
- Electric system: 1.500 V DC overhead
- Current collection: Pantograph
- Bogies: Bolsterless Bogie; Motor: MB-409; Trailer: TB-809
- Braking system: Electropneumatic Regenerative Brake
- Safety systems: TMS and Deadman Control
- Coupling system: AAR/Janney coupler Type H
- Seating: Longitudinal
- Track gauge: 1,067 mm (3 ft 6 in)

EA202 series, colloquially known as KfW i9000 after its financial backer the KfW, is an electric multiple unit train type produced by Industri Kereta Api (INKA) which operates across the KAI Commuter Yogyakarta Line and formerly in Greater Jakarta. EA202 series was purchased by Ministry of Transportation for 40 units (10 sets).

INKA collaborated with Bombardier Transportation to build EA202 series and it was completed in 2011. A total of 40 units (10 series) of 4 cars began to be brought in from the INKA factory in Madiun to Jakarta and went through a series of trials to see the performance and reliability.

In early 2013, EA202 series, which is similar in shape to EA201 series, underwent a trial operation before it is currently operating.

== Formations ==
List of formations of EA202 series
	Designation			
Numbering	1 (TC)	2 (M1)	3 (M2)	4 (TC)
TS1	K3 1 11 01	K3 1 11 02	K3 1 11 03	K3 1 11 04
TS2	K3 1 11 05	K3 1 11 06	K3 1 11 07	K3 1 11 08
TS3	K3 1 11 09	K3 1 11 10	K3 1 11 11	K3 1 11 12
TS4	K3 1 11 13	K3 1 11 14	K3 1 11 15	K3 1 11 16
TS5	K3 1 11 17	K3 1 11 18	K3 1 11 19	K3 1 11 20
TS6	K3 1 11 21	K3 1 11 22	K3 1 11 23	K3 1 11 24
TS7	K3 1 11 25	K3 1 11 26	K3 1 11 27	K3 1 11 28
TS8	K3 1 11 29	K3 1 11 30	K3 1 11 31	K3 1 11 32
TS9	K3 1 11 33	K3 1 11 34	K3 1 11 35	K3 1 11 36
TS10	K3 1 11 37	K3 1 11 38	K3 1 11 39	K3 1 11 40

== History ==
The EA202 consists of four cars in a single series. Since there are only four cars per series, the two circuits (TS) are merged to create a total of eight cars in one series. The initial series to commence operations were the combined TS1 + TS2 and TS9 + TS10 on 19 February 2013, followed by TS3 + TS4 and TS5 + TS6 on 7 March 2013, and TS7 + TS8 on 27 March 2013.

EA202 series was also operated in a single circuit (1 TS), for Feeder before it was operated in combination with 2 TS to fulfill the formation of 8 trains in 1 series. At the beginning of the operation trial, EA202 series only served in Duri–Tangerang, Tanah Abang–Maja, as well as feeder cross Kampung Bandan–Jakarta Kota and Manggarai–Tanah Abang–Kampung Bandan–Jakarta Kota. However, EA202 series eventually operates on other routes in Greater Jakarta.

Even though EA202 series is the EMU with the coldest AC, EA202 series was withdrawn to INKA due to several reliability problems such as breaking down, but eventually returned to operation, even though it was only a Feeder (eject) and rarely served in crowded traffic. In addition, due to lack of maintenance, many of these EMUs have hot air conditioners.

Several EA202 series sets not brought to INKA were also stored at the Depok depot, but in the end the EA202 series was pulled to INKA Madiun to undergo refurbishment.

The EA202 series has been refurbished at INKA, receiving updates to both the electrical system and its exterior and interior. The series now features a red and white batik livery, along with brown chairs. At present, the EA202 series is in use for the KAI Commuter Yogyakarta Line. EA202 series started service on the route on early 2021.

== See also ==
- CLI-225 series
