= Engineering Science Research Organization =

Indonesian research organization

- Organisasi Riset Ilmu Pengetahuan Teknik (ORIPT)

Agency overview
- Formed: 1 September 2021
- Preceding agency: Deputy III of Indonesian Institute of Sciences
- Dissolved: 1 February 2022
- Superseding agencies: Energy and Manufacture Research Organization; Nanotechnology and Material Research Organization; Electronics and Informatics Research Organization
- Jurisdiction: Indonesia
- Agency executive: Agus Haryono, Acting Head of ORIPT
- Parent agency: National Research and Innovation Agency

The Engineering Science Research Organization (Indonesian: Organisasi Riset Ilmu Pengetahuan Teknik, ORIPT) was one of original 7 Research Organizations under the umbrella of the National Research and Innovation Agency (Indonesian: Badan Riset dan Inovasi Nasional, BRIN). It was founded on 1 September 2021. The organization was transformation of Deputy III (Engineering Science) of Indonesian Institute of Sciences (Indonesian: Lembaga Ilmu Pengetahuan Indonesia, LIPI) after the liquidation of LIPI into BRIN.

On 24 January 2022, the organization is struck out and no longer listed in the BRIN Research Organizations list along with Assessment and Application of Technology Research Organization-BPPT, indicating the dissolution of the two organizations. The research centers of both organizations later rearranged and resulted into three research organizations: Research Organization for Energy and Manufacture, Research Organization for Nanotechnology and Material, and Research Organization for Electronics and Informatics. The dissolution is effective from 1 February 2022.

== History ==
Founded on 1 September 2021 as ORIPT, ORIPT was transformation of Deputy III (Engineering Science) of LIPI after the liquidation of LIPI into BRIN. As research organizations of BRIN, as outlined in Article 175 and Article 176 of Chief of BRIN Decree No. 1/2021, every Research Organizations under BRIN are responsible and answered to Chief of BRIN. It also prescribed that the Research Organizations consisted with Head of Research Organizations, Centers, and Laboratories/Study Groups. For the transitional period, as in Article 210 of Chief of BRIN Decree No. 1/2021 mandated, the structure of ORIPT follows the preceding structure that already established during its time in LIPI. Due to this, the structure of ORIPT follows the Chief of LIPI Decree No. 24/2020. On 22 September 2021, ORIPT constituting document, Chief of BRIN Decree No. 7/2021, signed by Laksana Tri Handoko and fully published on 8 October 2021.

On 24 January 2022, the organization is struck out and no longer listed in the BRIN Research Organizations list along with Assessment and Application of Technology Research Organization-BPPT.

== Structure ==
The structure of ORIPT was as follows:

1. Office of the Head of ORIPT
2. Research Center for Physics
3. Research Center for Chemistry
4. Research Center for Informatics
5. Research Center for Electronics and Communication
6. Research Center for Electric Power and Mechatronics
7. Research Center for Metallurgy and Materials Science
8. Research Center for Translational Science
9. Center for Testing Technology
10. Research Groups
