= Makassar–Parepare railway =

Railway line in Indonesia

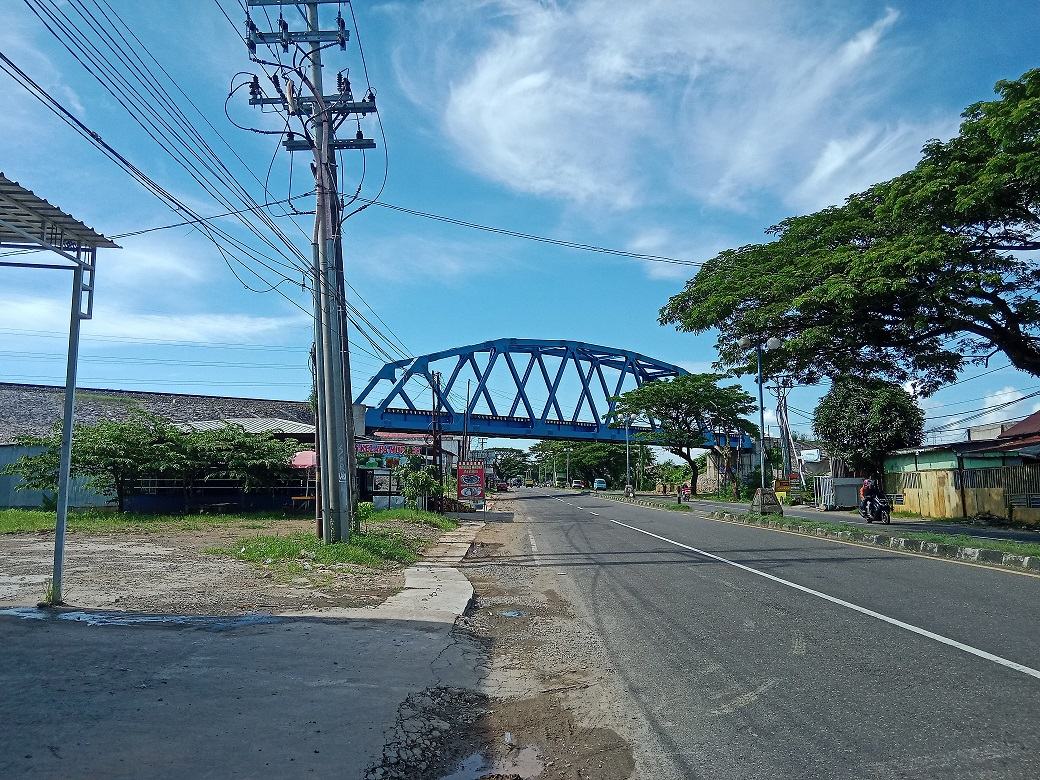
- A railway bridge over Maros-Pangkep street

Overview
- Status: Partly operational
- Owner: Directorate General of Railways (DJKA) of the Ministry of Transportation
- Locale: Makassar; Maros Regency; Pangkajene and Islands Regency; Barru Regency; Parepare
- Termini: Makassar; Parepare
- Stations: 17

Service
- Type: Main railway line
- System: Heavy railway line
- Operators: Train fleets; Kereta Api Indonesia (70%); PT Sulsel Citra Indonesia (30%); Infrastructures and facilities; PT Celebes Railway Indonesia; Stations; South Sulawesi Railway Management Agency

History
- Opened: 29 October 2022 (Garongkong–Mangilu); 2 December 2022 (soft launching, (Garongkong–Maros); 29 March 2023 (inauguration, Maros–Barru)

Technical
- Line length: 145 km (90 mi)
- Track gauge: 1.435 mm (4 ft 8 1/2 in)

The Makassar–Parepare railway is a railway line that connects Makassar and Parepare, South Sulawesi, Indonesia with approximately 145 km length. This is the first stage of the construction of the Trans-Sulawesi railway line which is the first railway line in Sulawesi. The process of laying the first stone for the construction of the Makassar–Parepare railway line was carried out on Monday, 18 August 2014 in Siawung Village, Barru District, Barru Regency.

The installation of the first rail was carried out on Friday, 13 November 2015 in Lalabata Village, Tanete Rilau District, Barru Regency. The rail installation was witnessed by the Director General of Railways of the Ministry of Transportation (Kemenhub) Hermanto Dwiatmoko and the Governor of South Sulawesi, Syahrul Yasin Limpo. This train line was tested for the first time on 10 November 2017.

Initially, this railroad line was built as a single track, but the prepared land can be built as a double track. This line is planned to have 17 stations which will be built as train stops.

This railroad line enters Kereta Api Indonesia's Operational Area 8 of Surabaya (Daerah Operasi 8 Surabaya or Daop 8 Surabaya). When operated, the occupancy on weekends reaches 100%. When the construction finished, it will save Makassar-Parepare travel time from 3 hours by car to 1.5 hours.

As of 2022, around 84 kilometer of its 145 kilometer length track is currently operational. The line is planned to be fully completed in 2026.

== Timeline ==
- 29 October 2022, limited operational of the Garongkong–Mangilu section. The fare was free until late 2022.
- 2 December 2022, soft launching of the Garongkong–Maros section (not yet opened for the public).
- 29 March 2023, the inauguration of the Makassar–Parepare railway between Maros–Barru by the President of Indonesia, Joko Widodo.
- 2026, planned to be fully operational.

== Operators ==
The train fleets are owned by PT KAI and PT Sulsel Citra Indonesia, under the name of the South Sulawesi Railway Consortium. Infrastructure will be managed by PT Celebes Railway Indonesia. The stations will be operated by the South Sulawesi Railway Management Agency (Indonesian: Badan Pengelola Kereta Api or BPKA).

== List of stations ==
=== Main line ===
Stations			Address	Altitude	Status
Number	Code	Name	Address	Altitude	Status
Trans Sulawesi route 1 Makassar–Parepare Section 3, Makassar–Mandalle
0100		Tallo (Makassar)			Under construction
0200		Parangloe	Untia, Biringkanaya, Makassar		Under construction
0300		Mandai	Ma'rumpa, Marusu, Maros	+11m	Operational
0400		Maros	Pallantikang, Maros Baru, Maros	+10m	Operational
0500		Rammang-Rammang	Salenrang, Bontoa, Maros	+70m	Operational
0600		Pangkajene	Kabba, Minasatene, Pangkajene and Islands Regency		Operational
0700		Bungoro	Sapanang, Bungoro, Pangkajene and Islands Regency		Operational
0800		Labakkang	Kassi Loe, Labakkang, Pangkajene and Islands Regency		Operational
1000		Ma'rang	Ma'rang, Ma'rang, Pangkajene and Islands Regency		Operational
1100		Mandalle	Manggalung, Mandalle, Pangkajene and Islands Regency		Operational
Section 1, Tanete Rilau–Barru (16 kilometres (9.9 mi))
1200		Tanete Rilau	Tellumpanua, Tanete Rilau, Barru		Operational
1300		Barru	Tuwung Barru, Barru		Operational
Section 2, Barru–Palanro (26 kilometres (16 mi))
1500		Takkalasi	Takkalasi, Balusu, Barru		Operational
1600		Mangkoso	Ajakkang, Soppeng Riaja, Barru		Operational
1700		Palanro	Manuba, Mallusetasi, Barru		Operational
Section 4, Palanro–Soreang (26 kilometres (16 mi))
		Lumpue	Lumpue, West Bacukiki, Parepare		Under construction
		Soreang (Parepare)	Ujung Baru, Soreang, Parepare		Under construction

=== Branch line to Tonasa cement factory ===
Stations			Address	Altitude	Status
Number	Code	Name	Address	Altitude	Status
0800		Labakkang	Kassi Loe, Labakkang, Pangkajene and Islands Regency		Operational
		Mangilu	Mangilu, Bungoro, Pangkajene and Islands Regency	+23,096 m	Operational

=== Branch line to Port of Garongkong ===
Stations			Address	Altitude	Status
Number	Code	Name	Address	Altitude	Status
1300		Barru	Tuwung, Barru, Barru		Operational
		Garongkong	Mangempang, Barru, Barru	+3,599 m	Operational

== Incidents ==
- On 1 February 2023, a disabled farmer named La Sudding (53) was declared dead after being hit by a Trans Sulawesi train in Barru Regency. The deaf and mute farmer became a victim because he did not hear the sound of the train crossing from east to west. He was hit while cycling after returning from the fields at around 11.00 WITA with an older friend. As a result of being hit, the victim was thrown 8 meters from the railroad tracks which are located not far from the Bottolai railway tunnel and died immediately. This is the first case of a resident being hit by a train on the Makassar–Parepare railway line since it began limited operations in October 2022. La Sudding is a farmer from Ammaro Village, Coppo Village, Barru District, Barru Regency, South Sulawesi. He died on the spot after sustaining severe injuries to the upper head.
- The Makassar-Parepare route train became viral because it was unable to climb the Mandalle-Tenete road plot. The train owned by Industri Kereta Api (INKA), which began trials in January 2023, was seen failing on the 15 percent incline of Jalan Mandalle heading to Tenete. South Sulawesi BPKA Public Relations, Ryan Agiastaguna, said that his office had seen the upload of the South Sulawesi train that was not strong enough to climb on Jalan Mandalle to Tenete. It is just that Ryan has not been able to comment on the upload. This is because the BPKA is waiting for INKA's explanation.
- On 14 March 2023, two cows died at once after being hit by a train that was crossing in Kalumpang Village, Macoa Neighborhood, Soreang Village, Lau District, Maros Regency, South Sulawesi. The two cows belonged to Habir (60), a Soreang Village resident who was grazing in the area. The cow that was hit died lying on the railroad tracks, while one other bounced off the rails. It is suspected that the cow was shocked and actually jumped onto the railroad tracks when the driver sounded the horn.
