= EA201 series =

Indonesian train type

EA201 series Kereta Rel Listrik Indonesia KRL-I
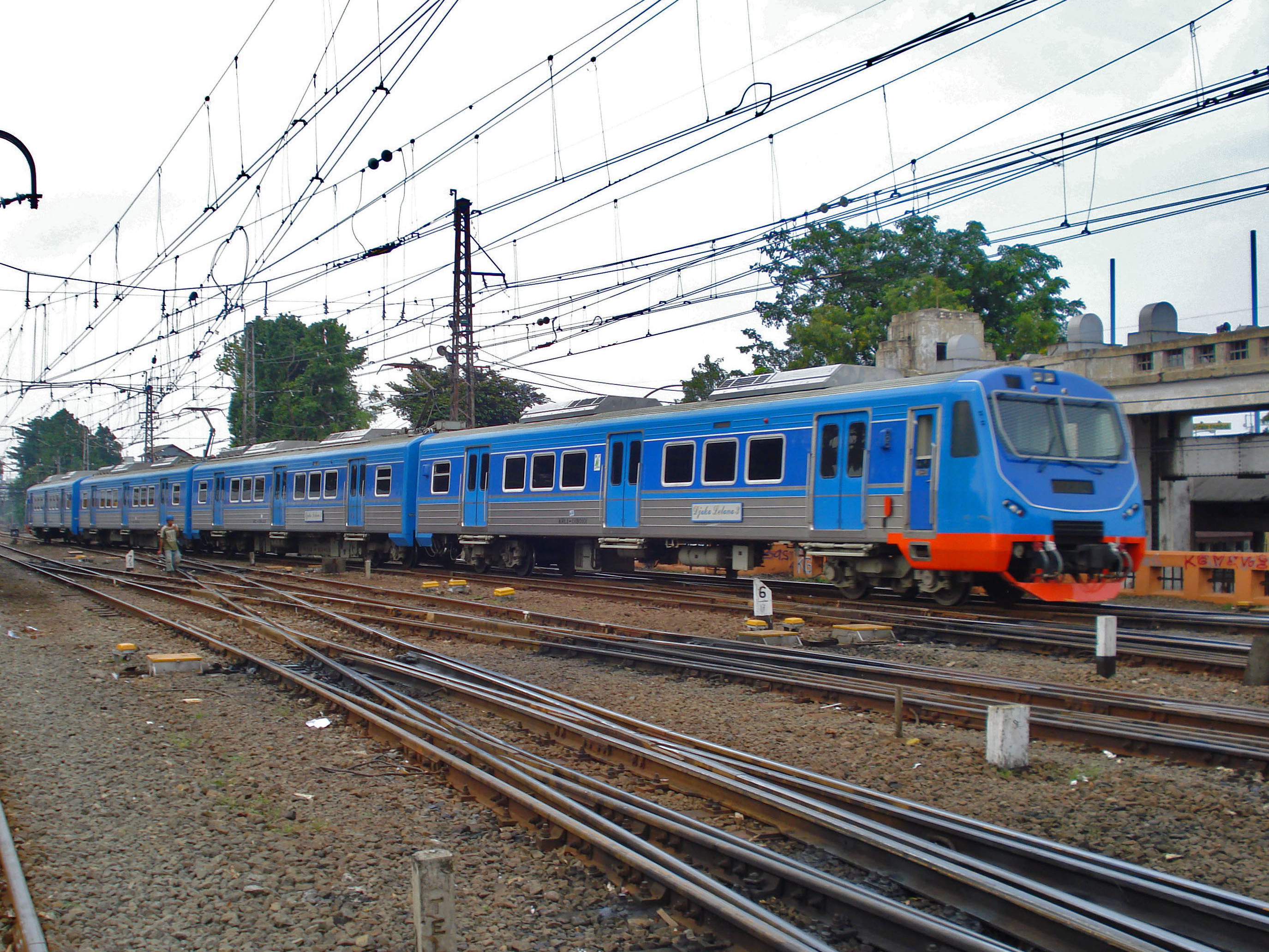
- EA201 series set in February 2011
- Stock type: Electric multiple unit
- In service: 2003–2014
- Manufacturer: Industri Kereta Api
- Built at: Madiun, Indonesia
- Replaced: EA102 series
- Constructed: 2001
- Entered service: 2003
- Refurbished: 2007–2009
- Number built: 8 unit (2 set)
- Number in service: none
- Number preserved: none
- Number scrapped: 8
- Successor: EA202 series
- Formation: 4 cars per trainset
- Operator: PT Kereta Api Divisi Jabodetabek (now PT Kereta Commuter Indonesia)
- Depot: Bukit Duri (BUD)
- Line served: (eject)

Specifications
- Car body construction: Stainless steel
- Car length: 20,000 mm (65 ft 7 in)
- Width: 2,990 mm (9 ft 10 in)
- Height: 3,820 mm (12 ft 6 in)
- Doors: 3 pairs per side
- Maximum speed: 120 km/h (75 mph)
- Traction system: IGBT–VVVF
- Auxiliaries: Static Inverter (SIV)
- Power supply: OHLE
- Electric system: 1.500 V DC overhead
- Current collection: Pantograph
- Braking system: Electropneumatic Regenerative Brake
- Safety systems: TMS and Deadman Control
- Coupling system: AAR/Janney coupler
- Seating: Longitudinal, Transverse
- Track gauge: 1,067 mm (3 ft 6 in)

EA201 series also known as Kereta Rel Listrik Indonesia (lit. 'Indonesian Electric Rail Train', abbreviated as KRL-I) was an AC electric multiple unit (EMU) commuter train type that once served the KRL Jabodetabek network from 2003 until 2014.

== Overview ==
EA201 was the first air-conditioned AC traction EMU made by PT. Industri Kereta Api (INKA). In the previous years, INKA had been experienced with manufacturing non air-conditioned EMU, such as EA101 series "BN-Holec" and EA102 series "Hitachi". This EMU served as the prototype for EA202 series, which would be constructed in 2011.

It was equipped with IGBT-VVVF traction from Toshiba in collaboration with PT. LEN. Two sets were made, numbered TS1 and TS2, both introduced at 2003. Initially, the first set was used on Pakuan Express service, painted in combination of blue and green livery, while the second formation was used on Serpong Express service with combination of white, orange, and yellow livery.

From 2007, both sets were repainted blue and reallocated to Ciliwung Loop Line service, a service which circles the KRL Jabodetabek network from Manggarai via Tanah Abang-Kampung Bandan-Jatinegara and back to Manggarai again. They operated there until the service itself was abolished in 2011, being replaced by the modern day Loop Line. After that, both trainsets were relegated to Jakarta Kota-Kampung Bandan feeder service until their retirement in 2014.

== Formations ==
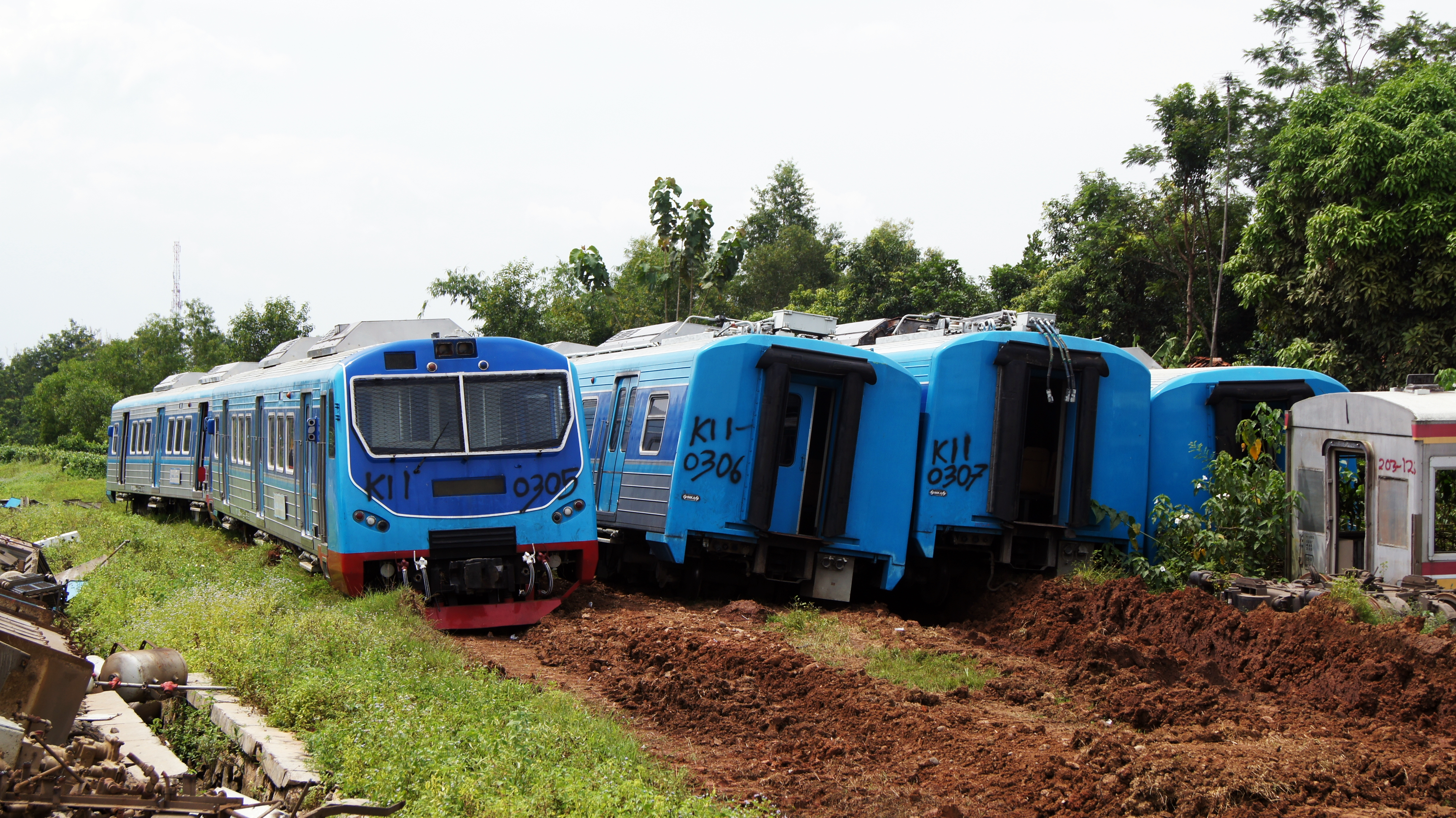
Scrapped trains at Cikaum in 2016

List of formations of EA201 series
	Designation			
Numbering	1	2	3	4
TS1	K1 1 03 01	K1 1 03 02	K1 1 03 03	K1 1 03 04
TS2	K1 1 03 05	K1 1 03 06	K1 1 03 07	K1 1 03 08

== See also ==
- CLI-225 series
