= Assessment and Application of Technology Research Organization-BPPT =

Indonesian research organization

- Organisasi Riset Pengkajian dan Penerapan Teknologi-BPPT (ORPPT-BPPT)

Agency overview
- Formed: 1 September 2021
- Preceding agency: Agency for the Assessment and Application of Technology
- Dissolved: 1 February 2022
- Superseding agencies: Energy and Manufacture Research Organization; Nanotechnology and Material Research Organization; Electronics and Informatics Research Organization
- Jurisdiction: Indonesia
- Agency executive: Dadan Moh. Nurjaman, Acting Head of ORPPT-BPPT
- Parent agency: National Research and Innovation Agency

The Assessment and Application of Technology Research Organization-BPPT (Indonesian: Organisasi Riset Pengkajian dan Penerapan Teknologi-BPPT, ORPPT-BPPT) was one of original 7 Research Organizations under the umbrella of the National Research and Innovation Agency (Indonesian: Badan Riset dan Inovasi Nasional, BRIN). It was founded on 1 September 2021 as transformation of Agency for the Assessment and Application of Technology (Indonesian: Badan Pengkajian dan Penerapan Teknologi, BPPT) after the liquidation of BPPT into BRIN.

On 24 January 2022, the organization is struck out and no longer listed in the BRIN Research Organizations list along with Engineering Science Research Organization, indicating the dissolution of the two organizations. The research centers of both organizations later rearranged and resulted into three research organizations: Research Organization for Energy and Manufacture, Research Organization for Nanotechnology and Material, and Research Organization for Electronics and Informatics. The dissolution is effective from 1 February 2022.

== History ==
Founded on 1 September 2021 as ORPPT (Indonesian: Organisasi Riset Pengkajian dan Penerapan Teknologi), ORPPT was transformation of BPPT into BRIN. As research organization of BRIN, as outlined in Article 175 and Article 176 of Chief of BRIN Decree No. 1/2021, every Research Organizations under BRIN are responsible and answered to Chief of BRIN. It also prescribed that the Research Organizations consisted with Head of Research Organizations, Centers, and Laboratories/Study Groups. For the transitional period, as in Article 210 of Chief of BRIN Decree No. 1/2021 mandated, the structure of ORPPT follows the preceding structure that already established during its time in BPPT. Due to this, the structure of ORPPT largely follows the Chief of BPPT Decree No. 12/2017.

On 22 September 2021, ORPPT constituting document, Chief of BRIN Decree No. 11/2021, signed by Laksana Tri Handoko and fully published on 8 October 2021. In the constituting document, it is revealed ORPPT retained BPPT old name. BPPT acronym however, no longer translated as "Badan Pengkajian dan Penerapan Teknologi", it just simply "BPPT", preserving historical BPPT name.

On 24 January 2022, the organization is struck out and no longer listed in the BRIN Research Organizations list along with Engineering Science Research Organization.

== Structure ==
The structure of ORPPT-BPPT was as follows:

1. Office of the Head of ORPPT-BPPT
2. Center for Mineral Resources Development Technology
3. Center for Disaster Reduction Technology
4. Center for Environment Technology
5. Center for Regional Resources Development Technology
6. Center for Agricultural Production Development Technology
7. Center for Agroindustry Technology
8. Center for Bioindustry Technology
9. Center for Pharmaceuticals and Medical Products Technology
10. Center for Electronics Technology
11. Center for Energy Resources and Chemical Industry Technology
12. Center for Material Technology
13. Center for Information and Communication Technology
14. Center for Defense and Security Industry Technology
15. Center for Machinery Industry Technology
16. Center for Transportation Systems and Infrastructure Technology
17. Center for Industrial Engineering and Maritime Technology
18. Research Groups
