= Research Organization for Nanotechnology and Material =

Indonesian research organization

- Organisasi Riset Nanoteknologi dan Material (ORNAMAT/ORNM)

Agency overview
- Formed: 1 February 2022
- Preceding agencies: Assessment and Application of Technology Research Organization-BPPT; Engineering Science Research Organization
- Jurisdiction: Indonesia
- Agency executive: Ratno Nuryadi, Head of ORNM
- Parent agency: National Research and Innovation Agency

The Research Organization for Nanotechnology and Material (Indonesian: Organisasi Riset Nanoteknologi dan Material, ORNAMAT or ORNM) is one of Research Organizations under the umbrella of the National Research and Innovation Agency (Badan Riset dan Inovasi Nasional, BRIN). On 24 January 2022, the formation of the agency is announced and to be formed on 1 February 2022. The organization is resulted from restructuration of Assessment and Application of Technology Research Organization-BPPT and Engineering Science Research Organization. ORNM formation is finalized on 1 March 2022 and is functional since 4 March 2022 with inauguration of its first head, Ratno Nuryadi.

== Structure ==
As the latest Chairman of BRIN Decree No. 10/2025, the structure of ORNAMAT is as follows:

1. Office of the Head of ORNAMAT
2. Research Center for Energy Material
3. Research Center for Composite and Biomaterials
4. Research Center for Metallurgy
5. Research Center for Mineral Technology
6. Research Center for Quantum Physics
7. Research Center for Molecular Chemistry
8. Research Center for Catalysts
9. Research Center for Photonics
10. Research Center for Polymer Technology
11. Research Center for Nanotech Systems
12. Research Center for Biomass and Bioproducts

== List of heads ==
No.	Head	Took office	Left office	Title
1	Ratno Nuryadi	4 March 2022	Incumbent	Head of ORNAMAT
