= EA203 series =

Indonesian train type

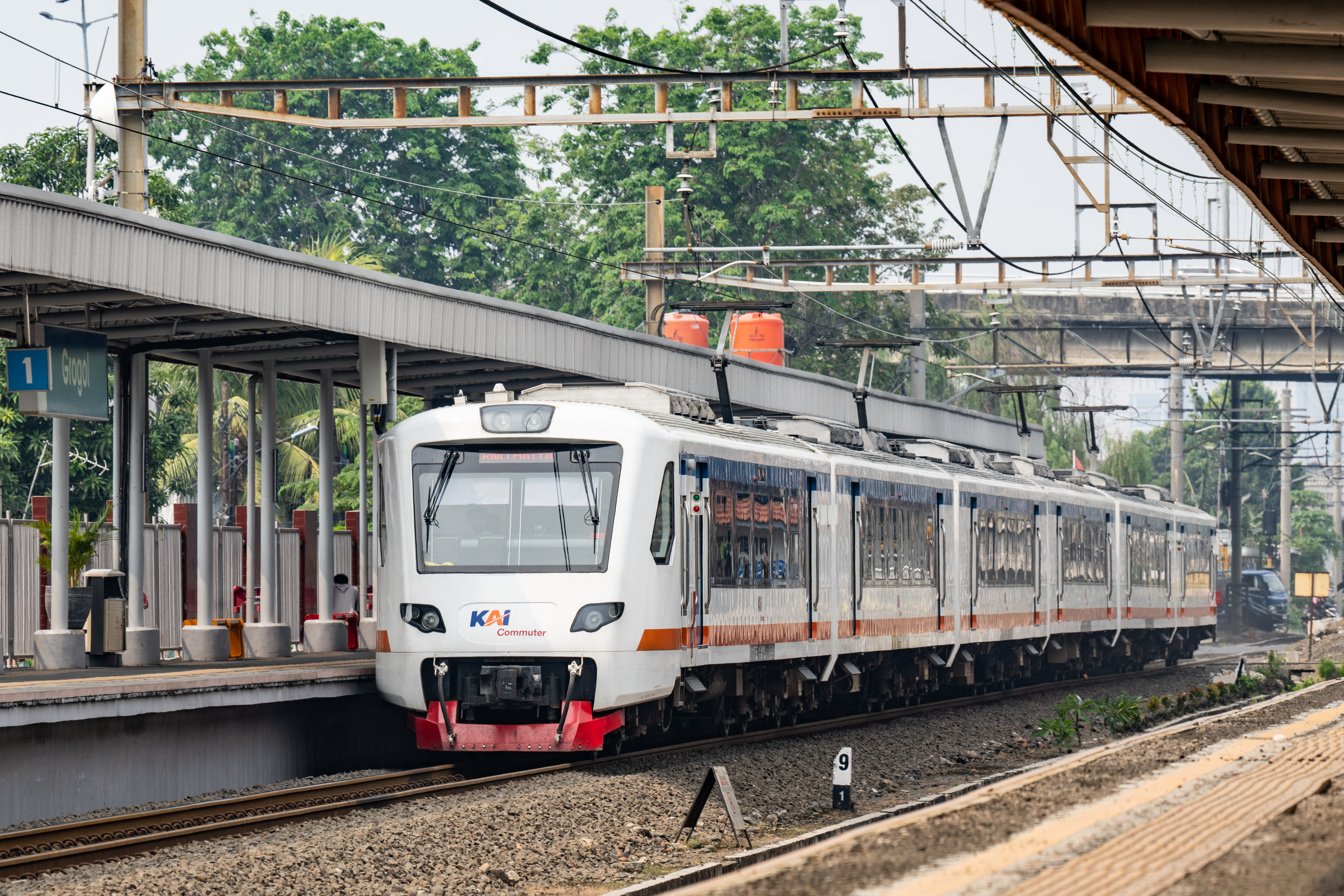
- EA203 series passed Grogol Station.
- Stock type: Electric multiple unit
- In service: 2017–present
- Manufacturers: PT Industri Kereta Api; Bombardier Transportation
- Constructed: 2017
- Entered service: 26 December 2017; 8 years ago
- Number built: 60 units (10 sets)
- Number in service: 60 units (10 sets)
- Formation: 6 cars per trainset
- Fleet numbers: K1 1 17 07–K1 1 17 66
- Capacity: 272 seats
- Operator: KAI Commuter
- Depot: Manggarai (MRI)
- Lines served: Airport Railink Soekarno-Hatta; KAI Commuter Tanjung Priok Line

Specifications
- Car body construction: Stainless steel
- Car length: 20 m (65 ft 7 in)
- Width: 2.99 m (9 ft 10 in)
- Height: 3.76 m (12 ft 4 in) (top of AC)
- Doors: 2 pocket doors per side
- Maximum speed: 100 km/h (62 mph)
- Weight: 35,500–39,000 kg (78,300–86,000 lb)
- Traction system: Bombardier MITRAC IGBT–VVVF
- Acceleration: 0.8 m/s²
- Deceleration: 0.8 m/s² (normal); 1.0 m/s² (emergency)
- Auxiliaries: Static Inverter (SIV)
- HVAC: I-COND
- Electric system: 1,500 V DC overhead lines
- Current collection: Pantograph
- Bogies: Bolsterless Bogie; Type: MB-514 (motor), TB-914 (trailer)
- Braking systems: Electro-pneumatic, regenerative
- Safety systems: TMS and Deadman Control
- Coupling system: AAR/Janney coupler
- Multiple working: none
- Track gauge: 1,067 mm (3 ft 6 in)

The EA203 series is an electric multiple unit produced by Industri Kereta Api, in collaboration with Bombardier which is used on the Soekarno–Hatta Airport Rail Link express services from Manggarai Station in Jakarta to Soekarno–Hatta International Airport at Tangerang, Banten. The EA203 series was purchased by PT Railink, a joint venture between PT Kereta Api Indonesia and PT Angkasa Pura II which is the operator of the airport train in Indonesia, totalling 60 units divided into 10 series with 6 car formations. EA203 series was sent from its factory in Madiun to Jakarta in stages starting in August 2017.

== Design and technology ==
=== Design ===
EA203 series has an aerodynamic exterior design with a shape like express trains in general. EA203 series is colored white with orange and blue stripes, which match the corporate identity of Railink and Kereta Api Indonesia (KAI). Around the passenger window, it is given a black color like the latest KAI executive trains which gives it the impression of elegant luxury. On cabins, there are three matrix objective display units light emitting diode which display the route of the train's journey, while on the middle train there are two display units for destination.

The interior is predominantly white in color, with passenger seats made of synthetic leather colored gray and blackish gray. The passenger seats on this EMU cannot be rotated, and have a configuration like the latest Indonesian railway economy trains, where seats number 1-5 face the direction of the train's journey downstream while numbers 6-10 face the opposite direction. There are also special seats for persons with disabilities that are sideways to the direction of the train, such as on regular Commuterline services, but with the same seat material as the other seats. In each train there is a luggage rack and a toilet with sitting toilets and a fireplace. In addition, there are also four television screens at each end of the row of chairs, which are used to show entertainment to EMU Railink users.

=== Technology ===
EA203 series uses the IGBT–VVVF traction system under the name MITRAC produced by Bombardier Transportation which is one of the most advanced traction propulsion systems ever produced by Bombardier at this time. EA203 series uses Train Information Monitoring System (TIMS) which is also used on other INKA-made AC EMUs. EA203 series uses air-spring bogie (bolsterless) with the TB-914 type on the train driver's cabin and the MB-514 on the middle train, which is a development of the EA201 series and Inka-Hitachi EMU, which also has a similar shape to the TR235D/TR241B/TR246E and DT50D bogie on the 203 series and 205 series which is a EMUs produced by a Japanese manufacturer. This type of bogie is known as a bogie with minimal shock. In addition, EA203 series is also more soundproof than other INKA EMU production. This is due to the use of accordion-type connection covers which are also used on the ex-Japanese EMU belonging to Kereta Commuter Indonesia.

== Formations ==
List of formations of EA203 series
	Designation					
Numbering	1 (TC)	2 (M1)	3 (M2)	4 (M1)	5 (M2)	6 (TC)
TS1	K1 1 17 07	K1 1 17 08	K1 1 17 09	K1 1 17 10	K1 1 17 11	K1 1 17 12
TS2	K1 1 17 13	K1 1 17 14	K1 1 17 15	K1 1 17 16	K1 1 17 17	K1 1 17 18
TS3	K1 1 17 19	K1 1 17 20	K1 1 17 21	K1 1 17 22	K1 1 17 23	K1 1 17 24
TS4	K1 1 17 25	K1 1 17 26	K1 1 17 27	K1 1 17 28	K1 1 17 29	K1 1 17 30
TS5	K1 1 17 31	K1 1 17 32	K1 1 17 33	K1 1 17 34	K1 1 17 35	K1 1 17 36
TS6	K1 1 17 37	K1 1 17 38	K1 1 17 39	K1 1 17 40	K1 1 17 41	K1 1 17 42
TS7	K1 1 17 43	K1 1 17 44	K1 1 17 45	K1 1 17 46	K1 1 17 47	K1 1 17 48
TS8	K1 1 17 49	K1 1 17 50	K1 1 17 51	K1 1 17 52	K1 1 17 53	K1 1 17 54
TS9	K1 1 17 55	K1 1 17 56	K1 1 17 57	K1 1 17 58	K1 1 17 59	K1 1 17 60
TS10	K1 1 17 61	K1 1 17 62	K1 1 17 63	K1 1 17 64	K1 1 17 65	K1 1 17 66

== Gallery ==
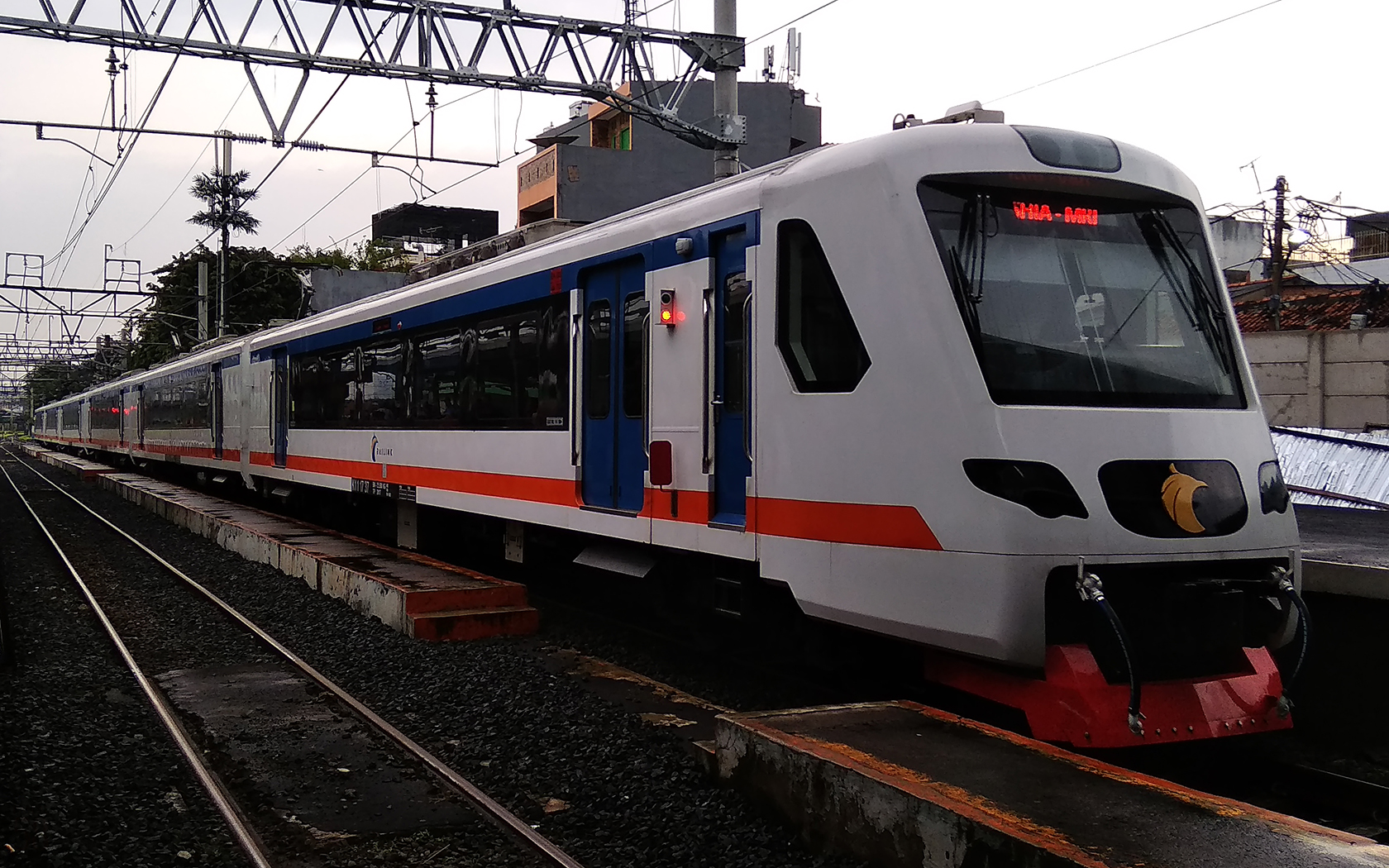
EA203 series at Duri Station.

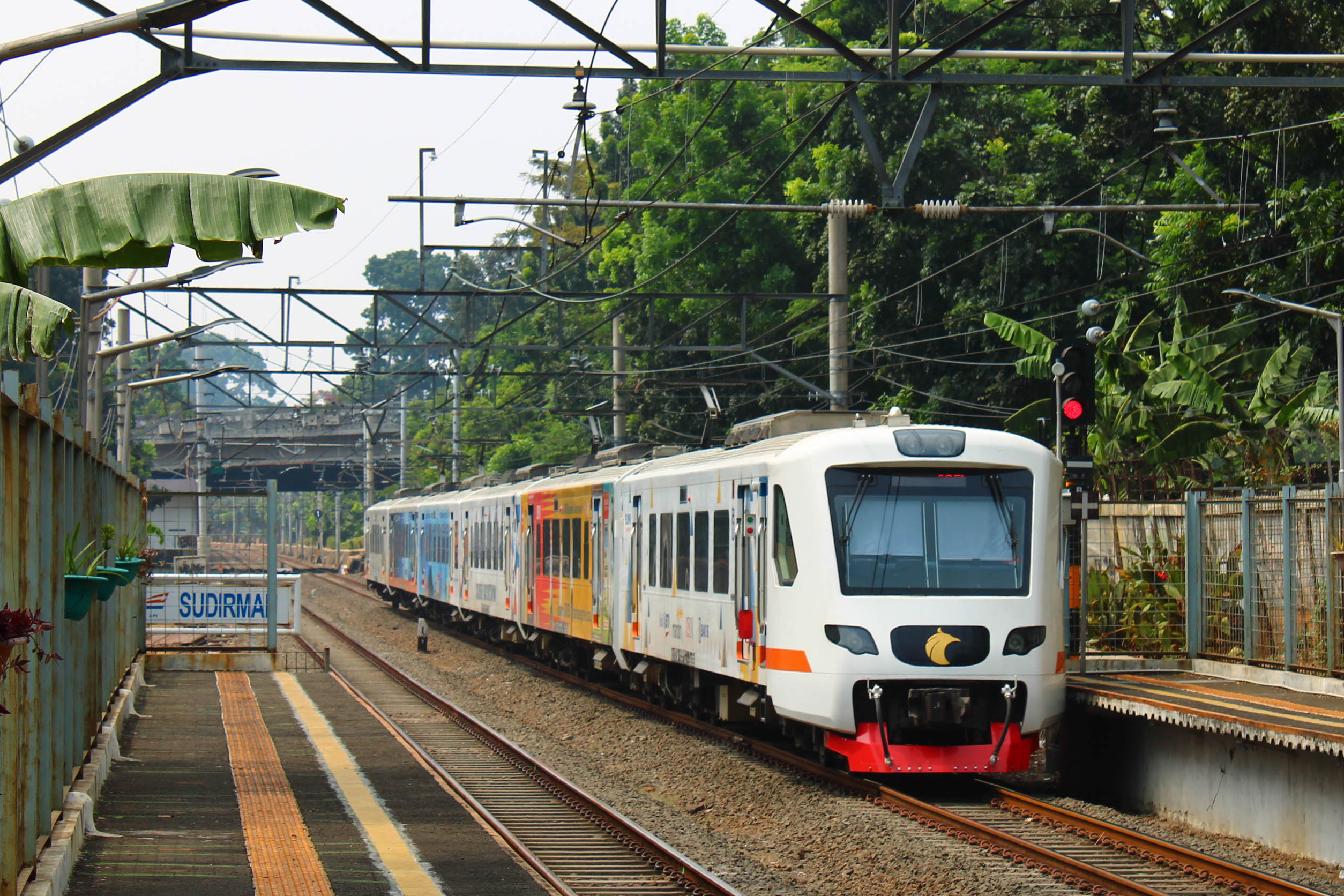
EA203 series leaving BNI City Station to change directions at Manggarai Station.

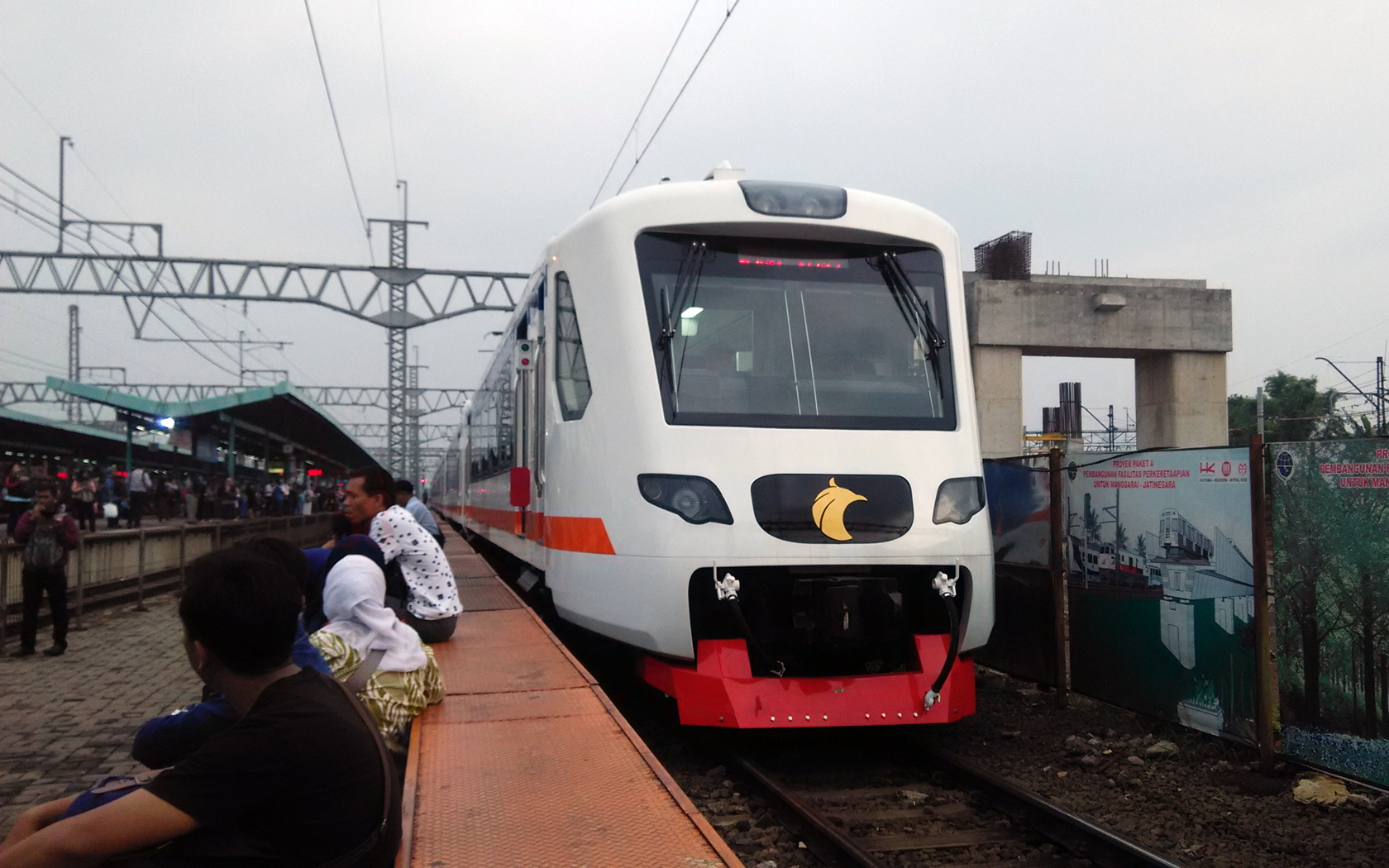
EA203 series during testing at Manggarai Station

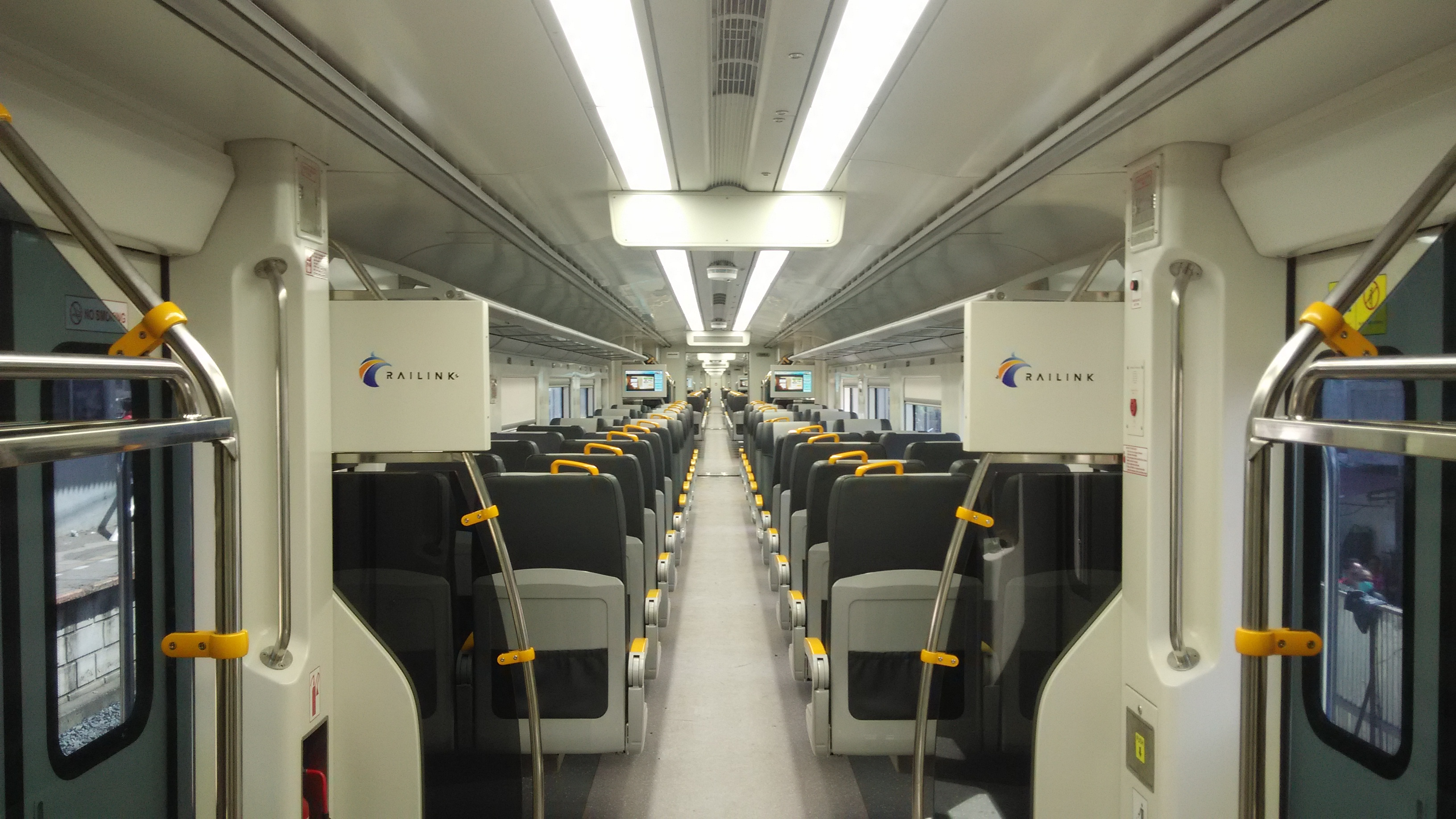
Interior of EA203 series

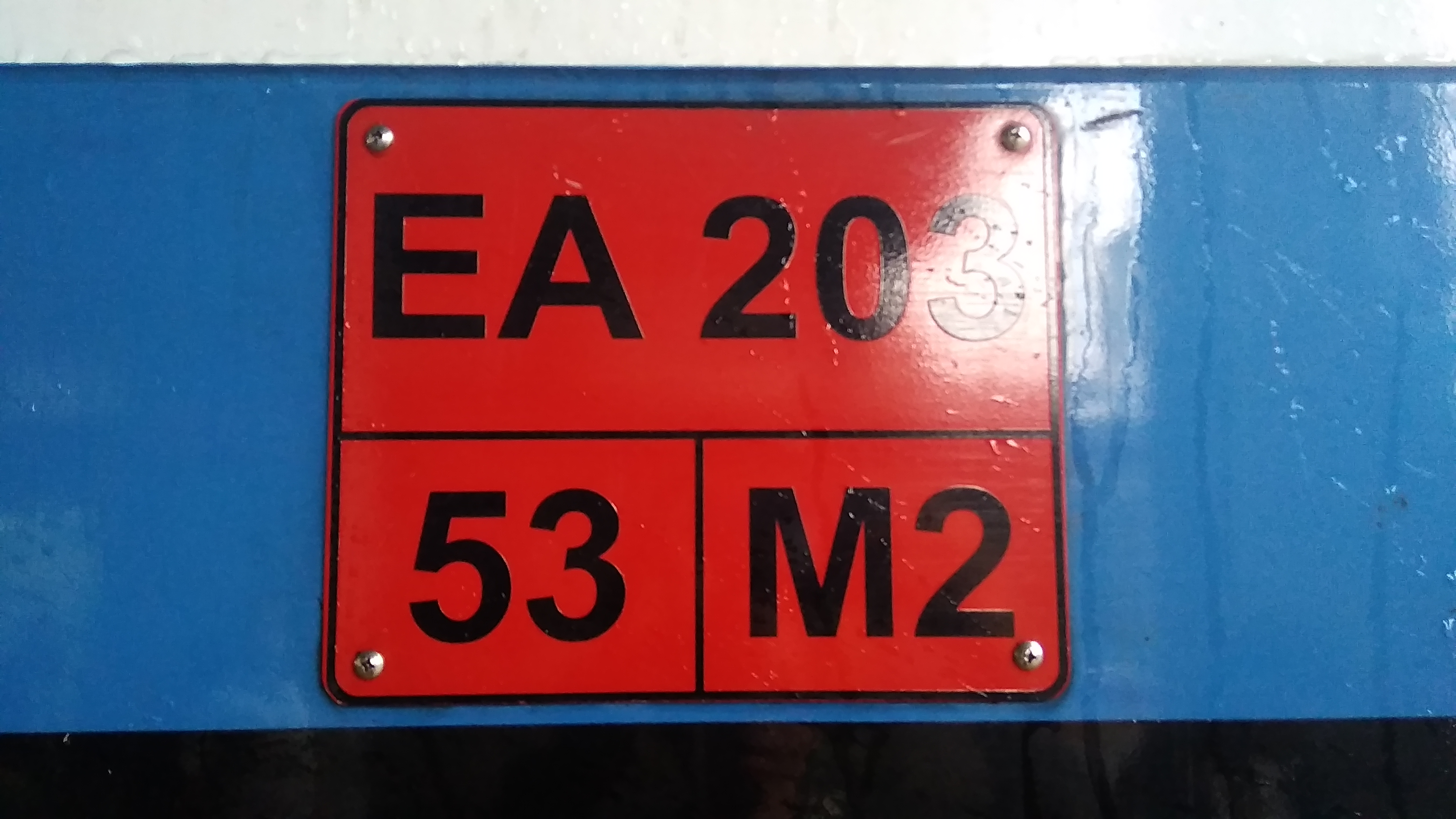
Plate on the EA203 series stating the EMU facility class number (not the service class type), maximum weight, and train code

== See also ==
- CLI-225 series
