= KCJB Feeder Train =

Train service in Indonesia

KCJB Feeder train

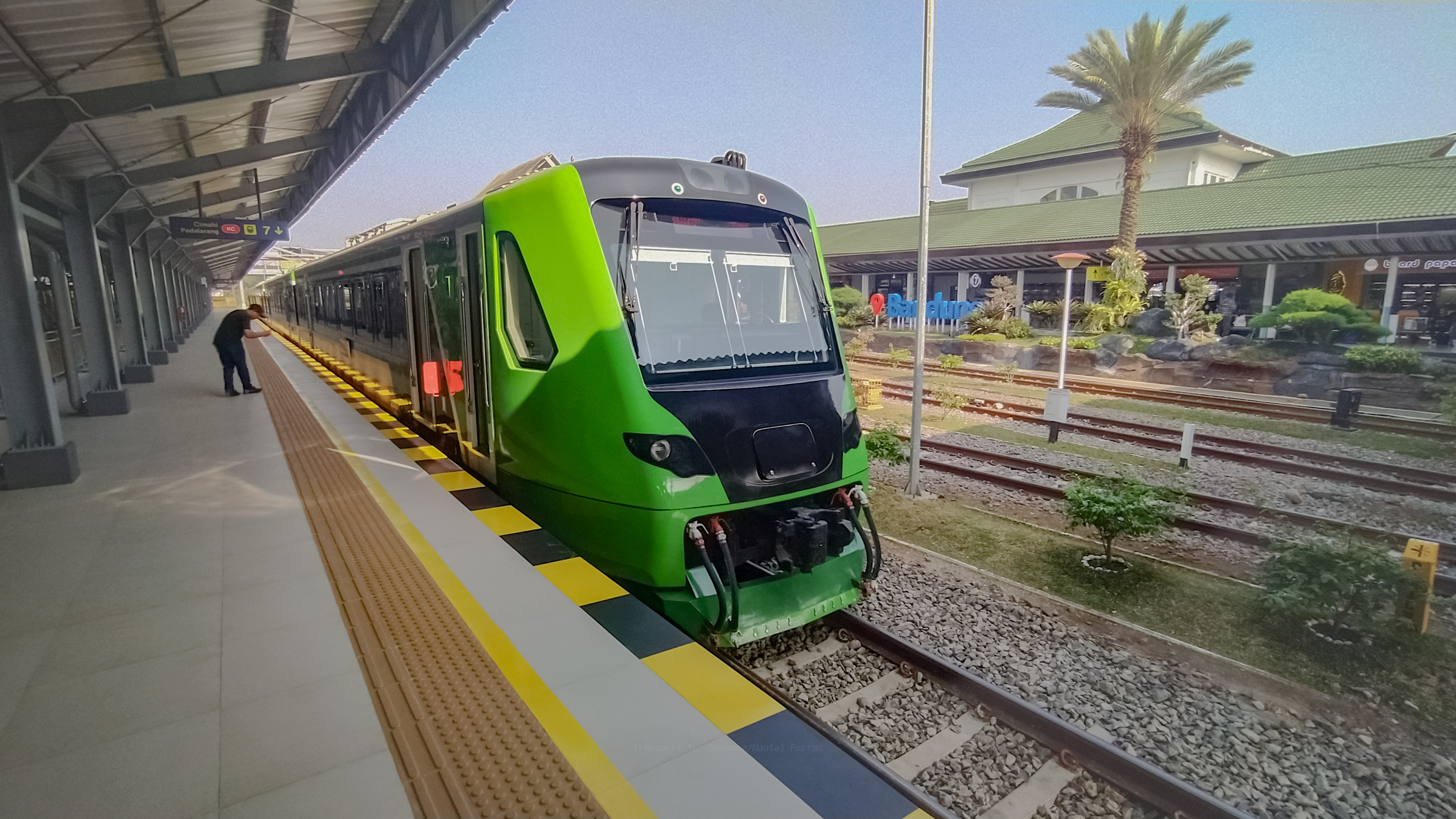
- KRDE KCJB Feeder Train at Bandung Station.

Overview
- Locale: Greater Bandung
- Current operator: PT Kereta Api Indonesia
- Ridership: 1.140 million (2024)
- Website: www.kcic.co.id; www.kai.id

Route
- Distance travelled: 14.9 km (9 mi)

Technical
- Rolling stock: INKA ME204 series DEMU

The KCJB feeder train (Indonesian: Kereta Api Pengumpan KCJB) (Note: KCJB itself stands for Kereta Cepat Jakarta–Bandung (Jakarta–Bandung high speed railway)) is a train service operated by Kereta Api Indonesia on the Padalarang–Bandung route in Greater Bandung, West Java, Indonesia. This train operates as a feeder for the Jakarta–Bandung Whoosh high-speed railway passengers from Bandung and Cimahi city areas to the high-speed railway hub at Padalarang Station.

The train began operating to serve public passengers on 3 October 2023, in conjunction with the Whoosh Experience programme organised by KCIC, using a series of ME204 Diesel Multiple Units (KRDE) made by Industri Kereta Api (INKA).

The service is a complement for Padalarang—Halim and Padalarang—Karawang Whoosh passengers, it is provided without surcharge and not sold separately. Stops at Bandung and Cimahi require valid westbound Whoosh tickets to board Padalarang-bound feeder train and only serves disembarking passengers for Bandung-bound trains. Boarding at Padalarang requires previous immediate Whoosh trip from Karawang or Halim. Using the feeder service is not allowed for Padalarang—Tegalluar Whoosh passengers.

== List of stations ==
Station	Transfer/Notes	Location
Padalarang	Jakarta–Bandung Whoosh HSR Inter-city trains Greater Bandung Commuter Line Garut Commuter Line Trans Metro Pasundan Padalarang bus terminal	West Bandung Regency
Cimahi	Inter-city trains Greater Bandung Commuter Line Garut Commuter Line Pasar Antri Baru bus terminal	Cimahi
Bandung	Inter-city trains Greater Bandung Commuter Line Garut Commuter Line Trans Metro Pasundan Trans Metro Bandung Trans Bandung Raya	Bandung

== Rolling stock ==
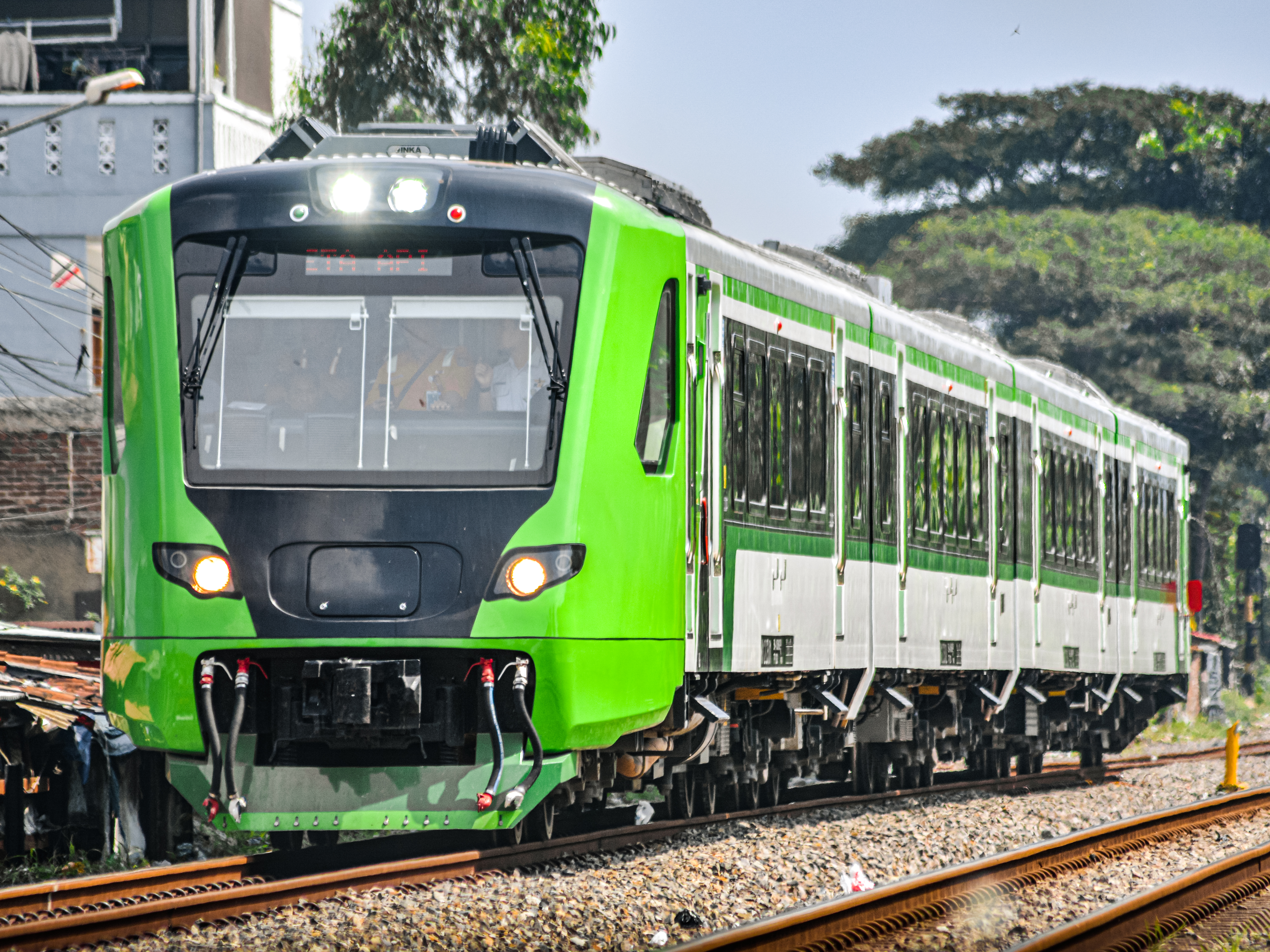
KRDE facilities used by KCJB Feeder Train

The rolling stock used for the operation of the KCJB feeder train is the Electric Diesel Rail Train (KRDE). It was made in 2023 by Industri Kereta Api (INKA), and designed with a four-carriage configuration with 200 seats. Accessible seats, luggage racks and power sockets are provided on the train.

The KRDE is capable of operating at a maximum speed of 100 km/h, making it capable of travelling from Padalarang to Bandung City in 20 minutes.

== See also ==
- High-speed rail in Indonesia
- Greater Bandung Commuter Line
- KAI Commuter
- Rail transport in Indonesia
