= Research Organization for Electronics and Informatics =

Indonesian research organization

- Organisasi Riset Elektronika dan Informatika (OREI)

Agency overview
- Formed: 1 March 2022
- Preceding agencies: Assessment and Application of Technology Research Organization-BPPT; Engineering Science Research Organization
- Jurisdiction: Indonesia
- Agency executive: Budi Prawara, Head of OREI
- Parent agency: National Research and Innovation Agency

The Research Organization for Electronics and Informatics (Indonesian: Organisasi Riset Elektronika dan Informatika, OREI) is one of Research Organizations under the umbrella of the National Research and Innovation Agency (Badan Riset dan Inovasi Nasional, BRIN). On 24 January 2022, the formation of the agency is announced and to be formed on 1 February 2022. The organization is resulted from restructuration of Assessment and Application of Technology Research Organization-BPPT and Engineering Science Research Organization, with addition of Human Resources Research and Development Agency of the Ministry of Communication and Information Technology. OREI formation is finalized on 1 March 2022 and is functional since 4 March 2022 with inauguration of its first head, Budi Prawara.

== Structure ==
As the latest Chairman of BRIN Decree No. 18/2023, the structure of OREI is as follows:

1. Office of the Head of OREI
2. Research Center for Telecommunication
3. Research Center for Electronics
4. Research Center for Data and Information Sciences
5. Research Center for Artificial Intelligence and Cybersecurity
6. Research Center for Computing
7. Research Center for Smart Mechatronics
8. Research Center for Geoinformatics
9. Research Groups

== List of heads ==
No.	Head	Took office	Left office	Title
1	Budi Prawara	4 March 2022	Incumbent	Head of OREI
