= Karawang HSR station =

High-speed railway station in Indonesia

Karawang Station Stasiun Karawang
- Karawang Station in August 2026

General information
- Location: Jalan Neglasari, Wanakerta; Karawang Regency, West Java; Indonesia
- Coordinates: 6.3656612°S 107.2187006°E
- Elevation: 20.721 m (67.98 ft)
- System: High-speed rail station
- Owner: Pilar Sinergi BUMN Indonesia; Beijing Yawan HSR Co. Ltd.
- Operator: Kereta Cepat Indonesia China
- Platforms: 2 side platforms
- Tracks: 4

Construction
- Structure type: Elevated
- Parking: Available
- Accessible: Available

Other information
- Station code: HSR-KRW

History
- Opened: 24 December 2024
- Electrified: 2024

Services
Preceding station	KCIC	Following station
Halim Terminus	Jakarta–Bandung high-speed railway	Padalarang towards Tegalluar
Location

Karawang HSR Station is a large class A-type high-speed railway station located in Wanakerta, Karawang Regency, West Java, Indonesia. The station only serves the Jakarta–Bandung Whoosh high-speed rail route.

Karawang Station began to serve passengers of the Whoosh high-speed rail since 24 December 2024, more than a year after the HSR line was commenced in October 2023. The delayed opening was caused by the unavailability of its direct road access from the Jakarta–Cikampek Toll Road regarding to land acquisitions. However, the station was opened when the direct access is still not constructed yet.

== Station layout ==
This station has four tracks with two straight tracks which are only used for direct overtake and two turning tracks which are equipped with side platforms. Apart from the four main lines for train services, this station also has a depot for storing comprehensive inspection trains (EMU-CIT) and ballast stone trains to the south of the emplacement.

Karawang
1st floor	Mechanical train depot access line
1st floor	Side platform, the doors are opened on the right side
1st floor	Line 4	← (Padalarang)	Jakarta–Bandung HSR to Tegalluar Summarecon
1st floor	Line 3	← (Padalarang)	Straight tracks for direct overtake
1st floor	Line 2		Straight tracks for direct overtake	(Halim) →
1st floor	Line 1		Jakarta–Bandung HSR to Halim →
1st floor	Side platform, the doors are opened on the right side
Ground floor	Entrance and exit, drop-off area, ticket vending machines, customer service/locket, retail kiosks, and inter-platform connection tunnel

== Gallery ==
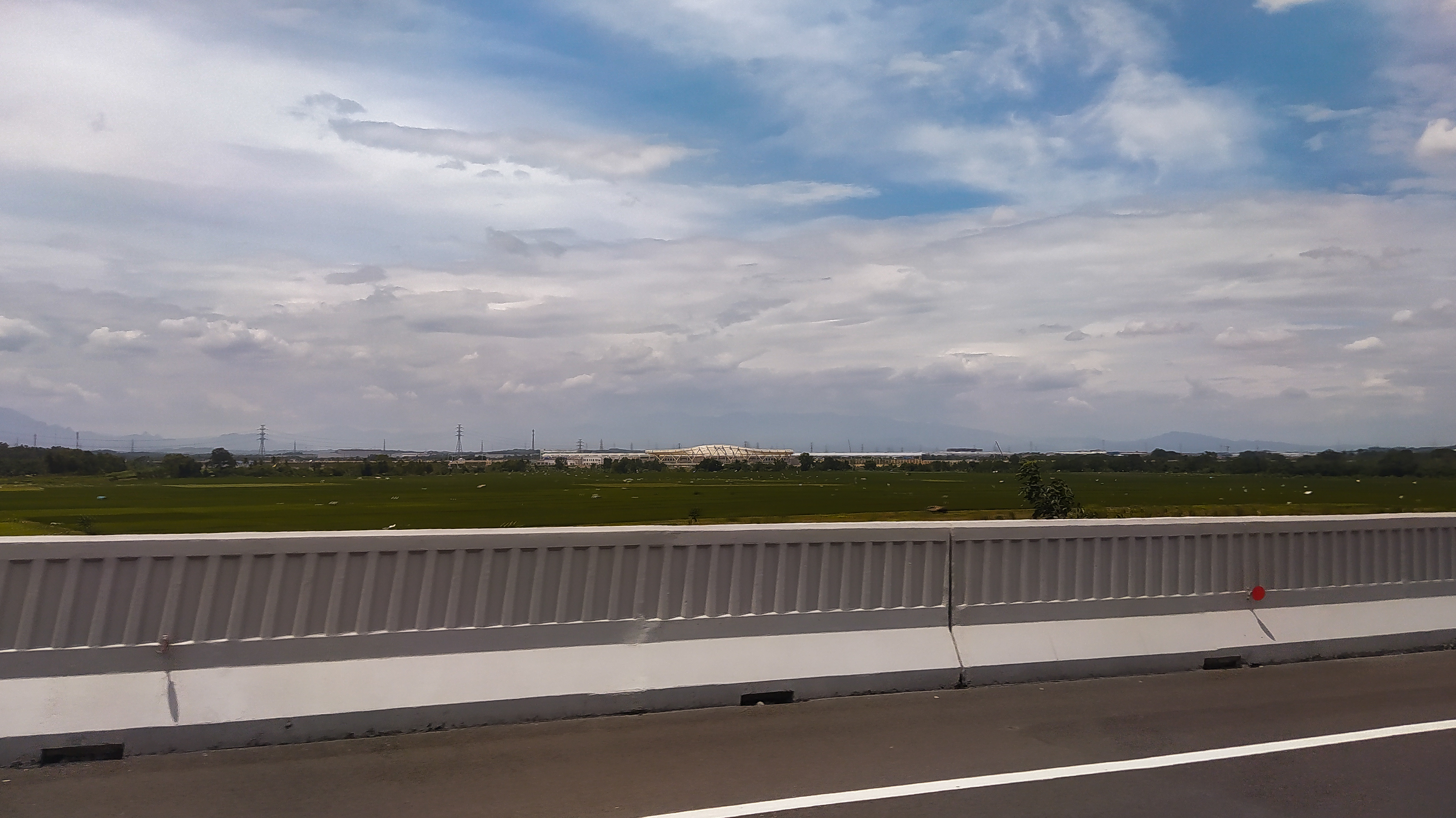
Karawang HSR Station under construction, viewed from the MBZ Skyway, February 2023

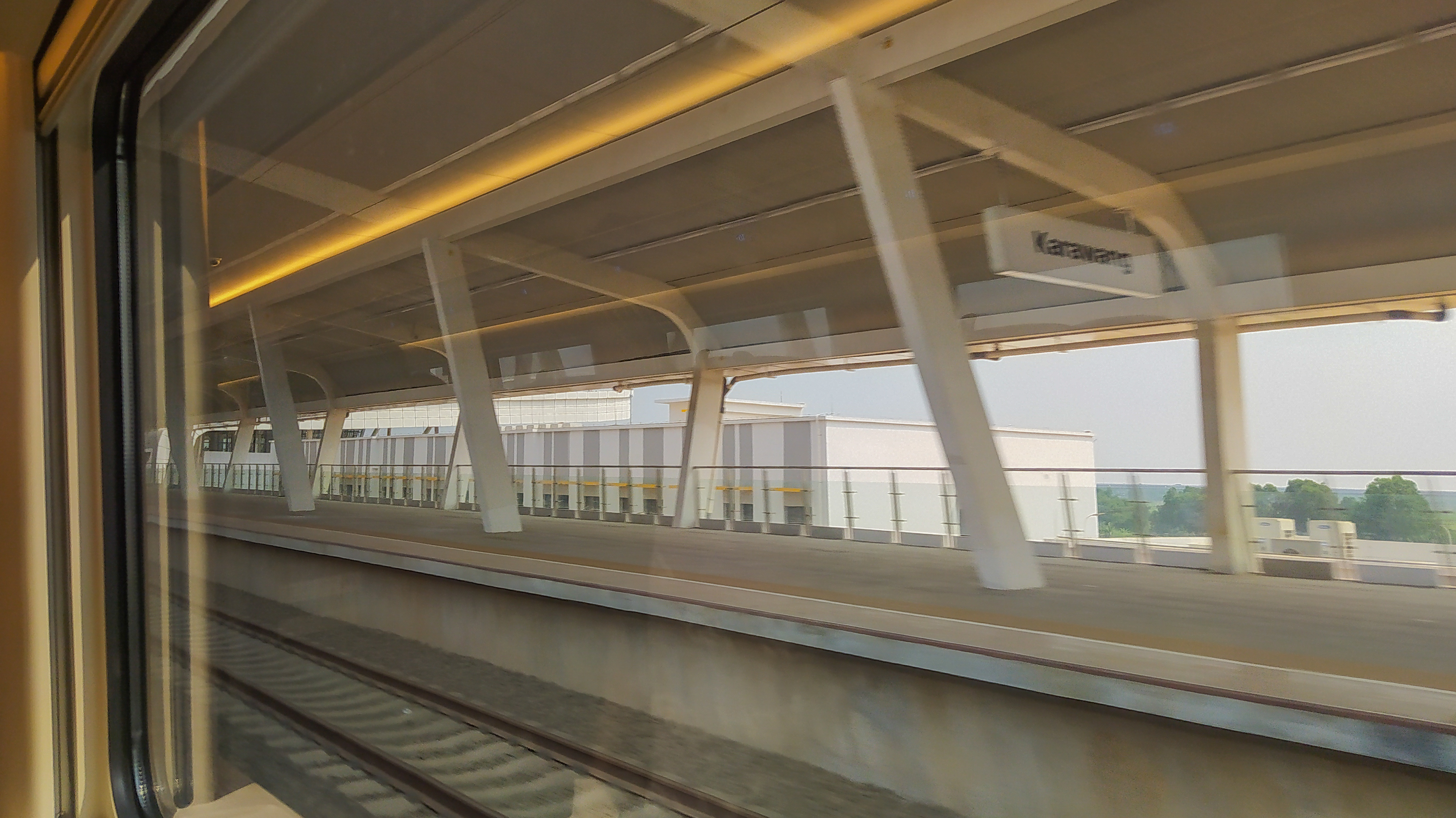
Karawang HSR Station's platform, October 2023

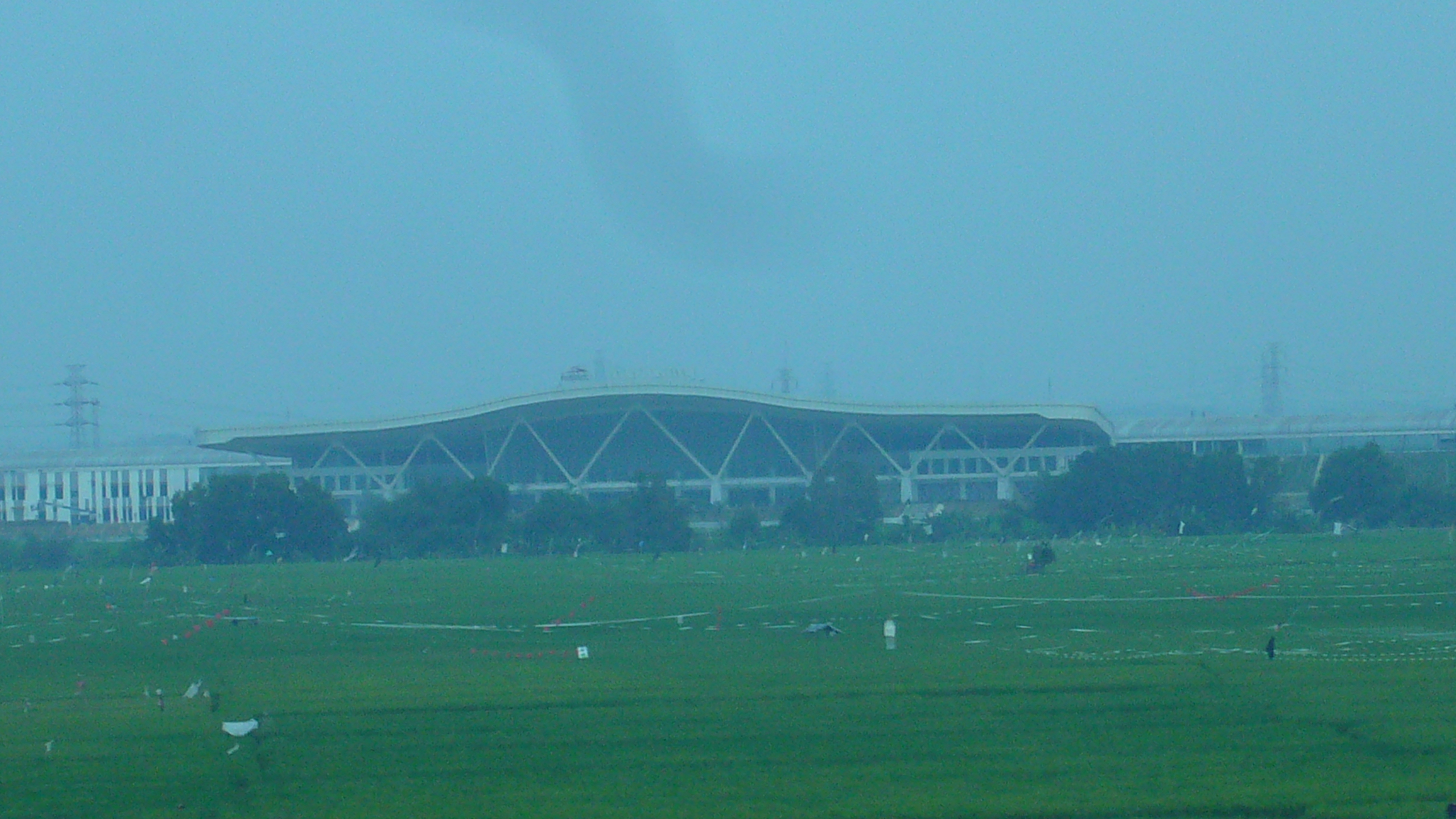
Karawang HSR Station, May 2024
