= Bluebird Group =

Indonesian taxicab and transportation company

PT Blue Bird Tbk
- Company logo since June 2018
- Trade name: IDX: BIRD
- Type: Public (Perseroan terbatas)
- Industry: Transportation
- Founded: 1 May 1972; 54 years ago
- Founders: Mutiara Fatimah Djokosoetono; Chandra Suharto; Purnomo Prawiro
- Headquarters: Mampang Prapatan, South Jakarta, Indonesia
- Brands: Bluebird (taxi); Silverbird (executive taxi); Goldenbird (car rental); Bigbird (bus rental); Cititrans (shuttle services); Ironbird (cargo)
- Owner: Djokosoetono family
- Website: www.bluebirdgroup.com

PT Blue Bird Tbk, operating as Bluebird (Note: Formerly Blue Bird with an additional space between until June 2018.) Group, is an Indonesian transportation company based in Jakarta. Established in 1972, the company is known for its Bluebird taxicab service as well as other transportation services.

== History ==
Blue Bird Group was founded by Mutiara Fatimah Djokosoetono, the wife of Djokosoetono, who was the founder of the Jakarta-based College of Policing (STIK) and the College of Military Law (AHM), as well as the first dean of the Faculty of Law at the University of Indonesia. She founded the company with her two sons, Chandra Suharto and Purnomo Prawiro. They established a non-argo taxi company named Chandra Taksi (after Chandra Suharto), which is considered the predecessor of Blue Bird. Chandra Taksi started its operation from two cars granted by the people at PTIK and AHM. Chandra Taksi was considered an illegal taxi operation (taksi gelap) because the company utilised private cars for taxi service.

They officially founded Blue Bird in 1972, with their other business partners after had obtained permit from Jakarta Office of Transportation. Initially started with a fleet of 25 taxis, the company increased the fleet up to 500 in 1978, then later jumped into 2,000 in 1985. Its first Holden Torana fleet is currently on display at the company's headquarters. Blue Bird pioneered several innovations in the Indonesian taxicab industry, including argometer-based tariffs, air-conditioned taxis, and GPS system installations.

In 2011, Blue Bird launched its mobile app. At the same year, the company become the first taxi company in Indonesia to gave its mobile reservation via BlackBerry. On 5 November 2014, the company went public on Indonesia Stock Exchange.

On 30 March 2017, Blue Bird collaborated with the technology group Gojek to launch Go-Blue Bird, which enable consumers to order Blue Bird taxis directly through the Gojek app.

On 6 June 2018, Blue Bird unveiled a new company logo. At the same time, the company respelled its name to Bluebird, where the additional space between the word 'blue' and 'bird' was removed, merging both words into one. This spelling alignment was also applied to the company's business units; for example, Silver Bird was respelled to Silverbird.

On 22 April 2019, Bluebird launched their electric taxi fleet, e-Taxi, which consist of 25 BYD e6s for the regular Bluebird taxis and 5 Tesla Model X 75Ds for the executive Silverbird taxis, a first in the Indonesian taxicab industry. Both e6 and Model X taxis went on service on 1 May 2019, coinciding with the company's 47th anniversary.

== Business units ==
Bluebird Group is known for its two land transportation services: Bluebird regular taxis and Silverbird executive taxis. The company has since then expanded further into other business such as vehicle rental, pre-owned vehicle sales, intercity transport, charter transport, logistics, property industry, heavy equipments, and IT consultation services.

=== Bluebird ===
Bluebird (previously spelled as Blue Bird) is the company's core business unit since their establishment in 1972, focusing on regular taxi service.

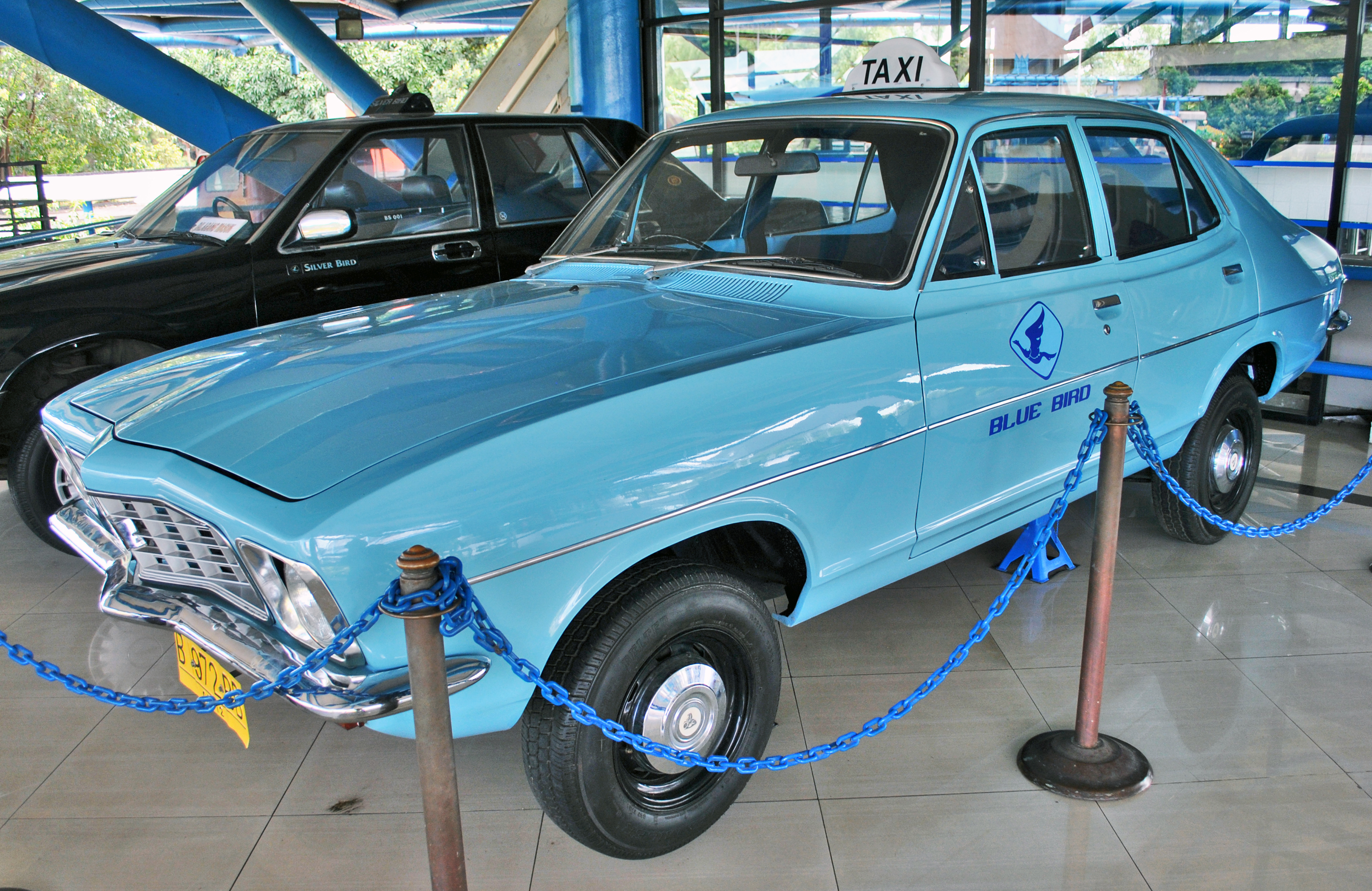
Holden Torana (LJ), the first Blue Bird taxicab

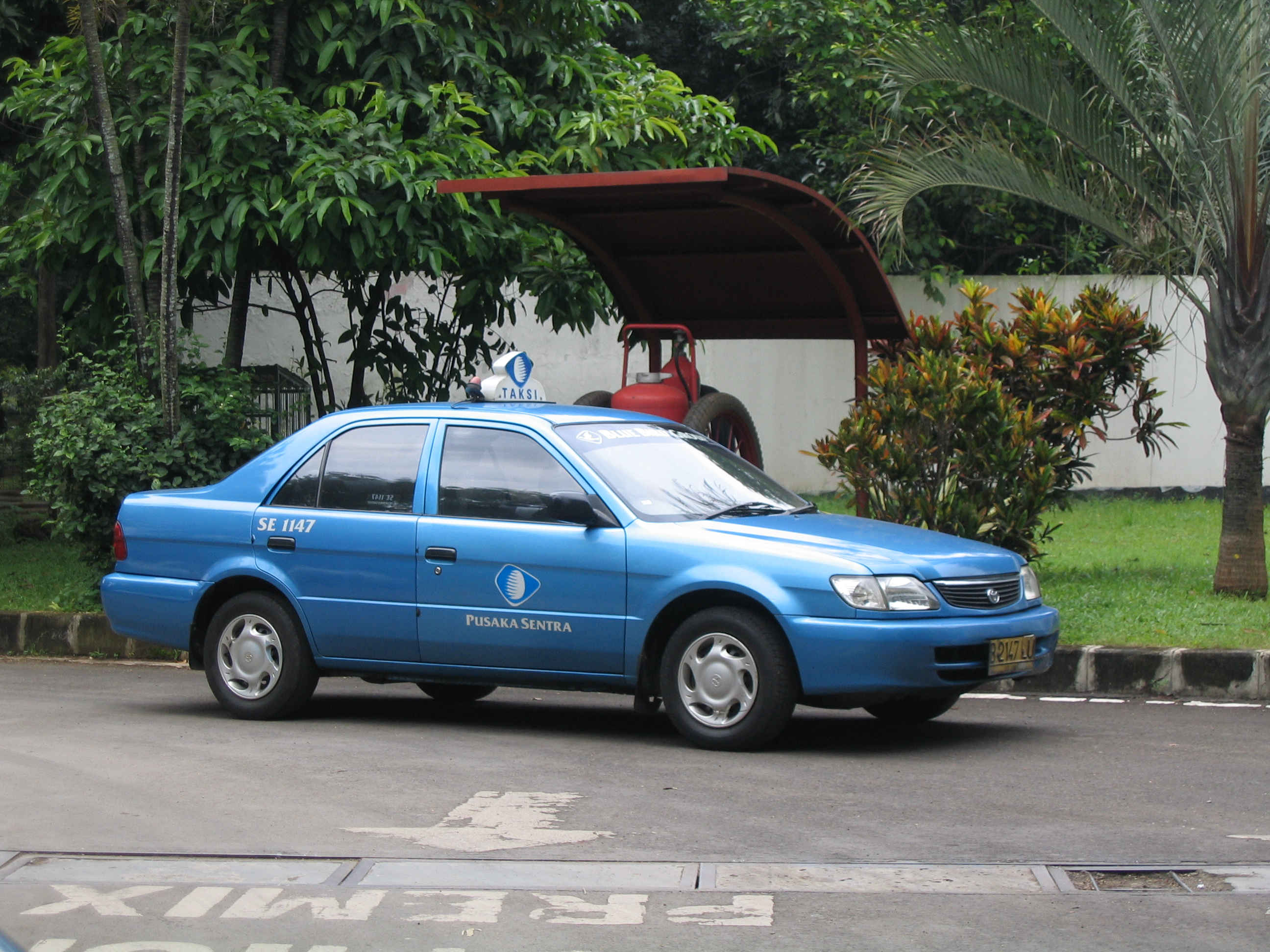
Toyota Soluna (AL50), old Pusaka Sentra livery

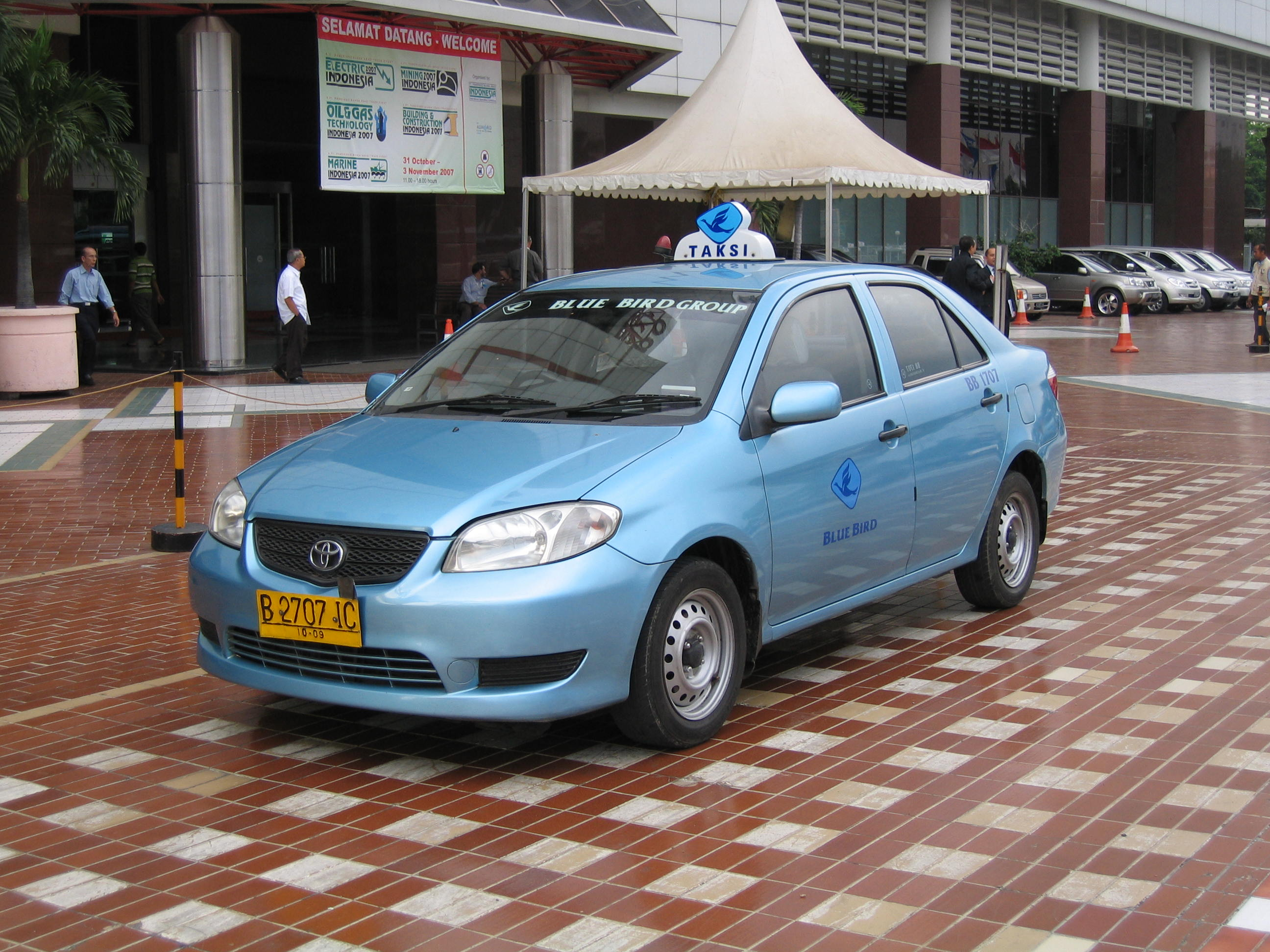
Toyota Limo (NCP42), old Blue Bird livery

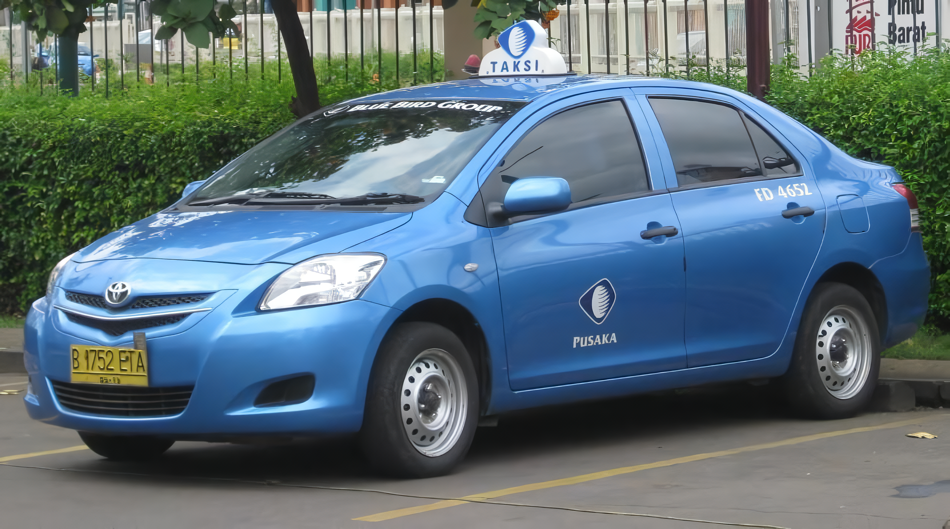
Toyota Limo (NCP93), old Pusaka livery

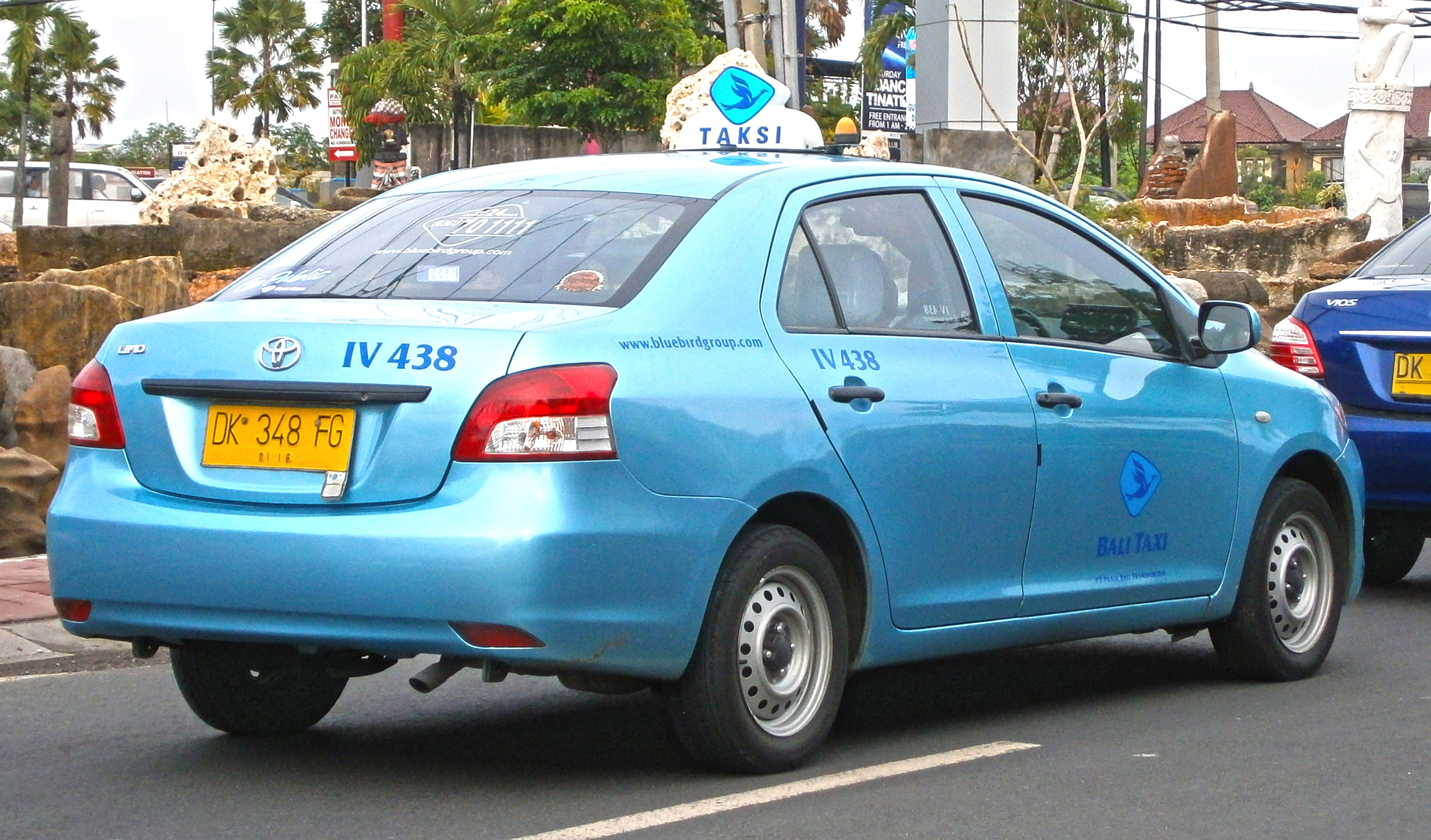
Toyota Limo (NCP93), old Bali Taxi livery

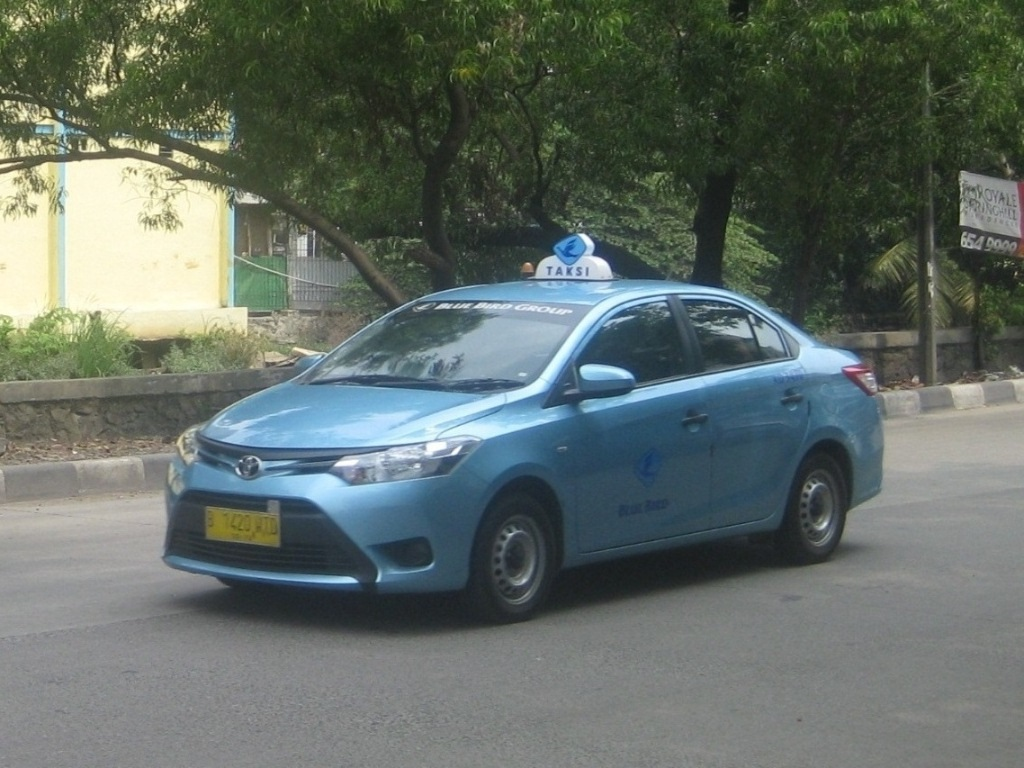
Toyota Limo (XP150), old Blue Bird livery

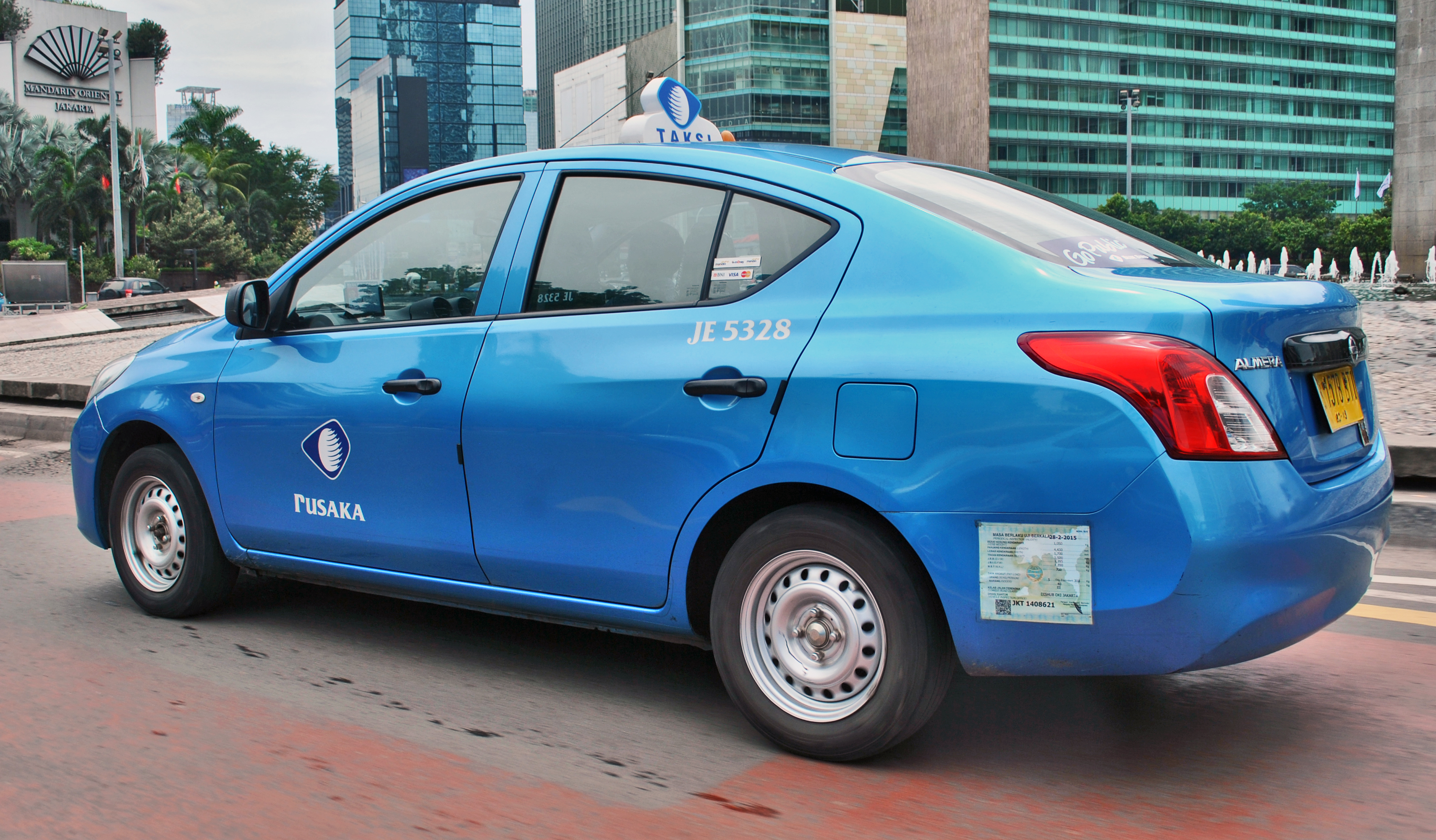
Nissan Almera (N17), old Pusaka livery

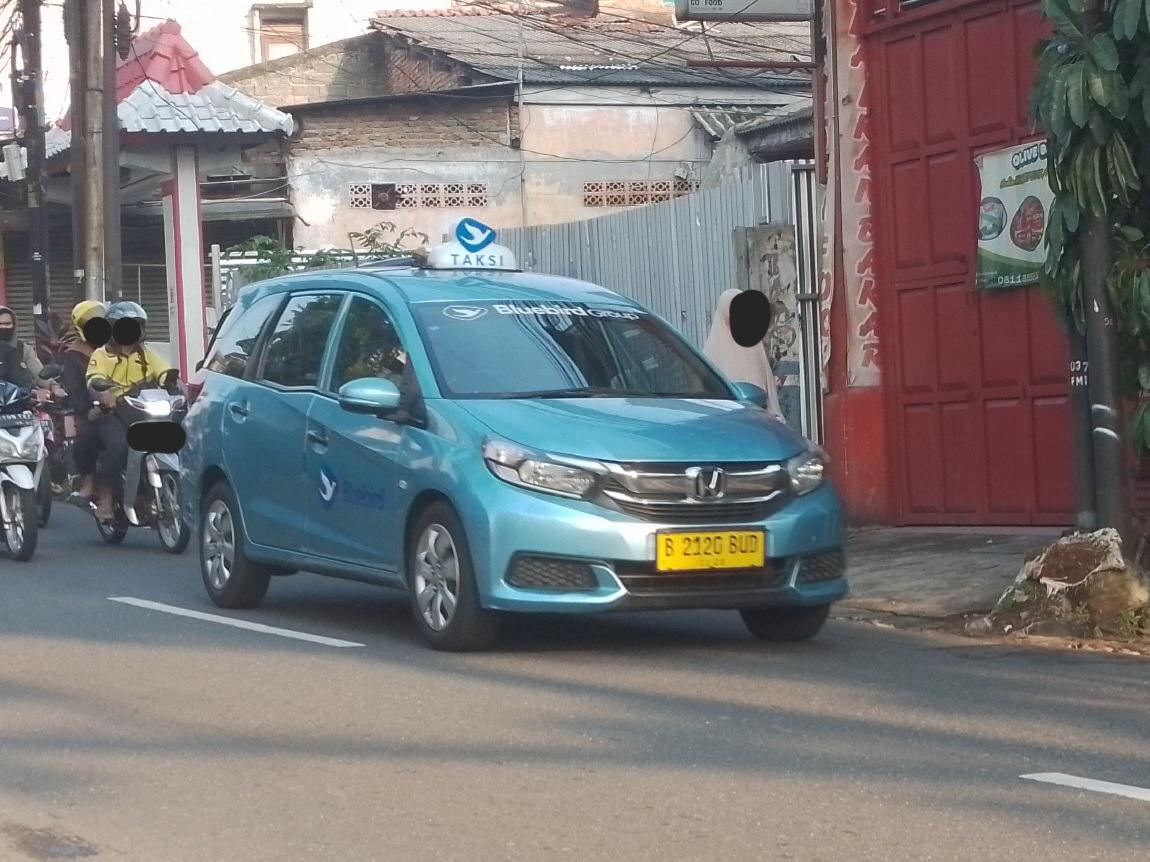
Honda Mobilio (DD4/5), Bluebird livery

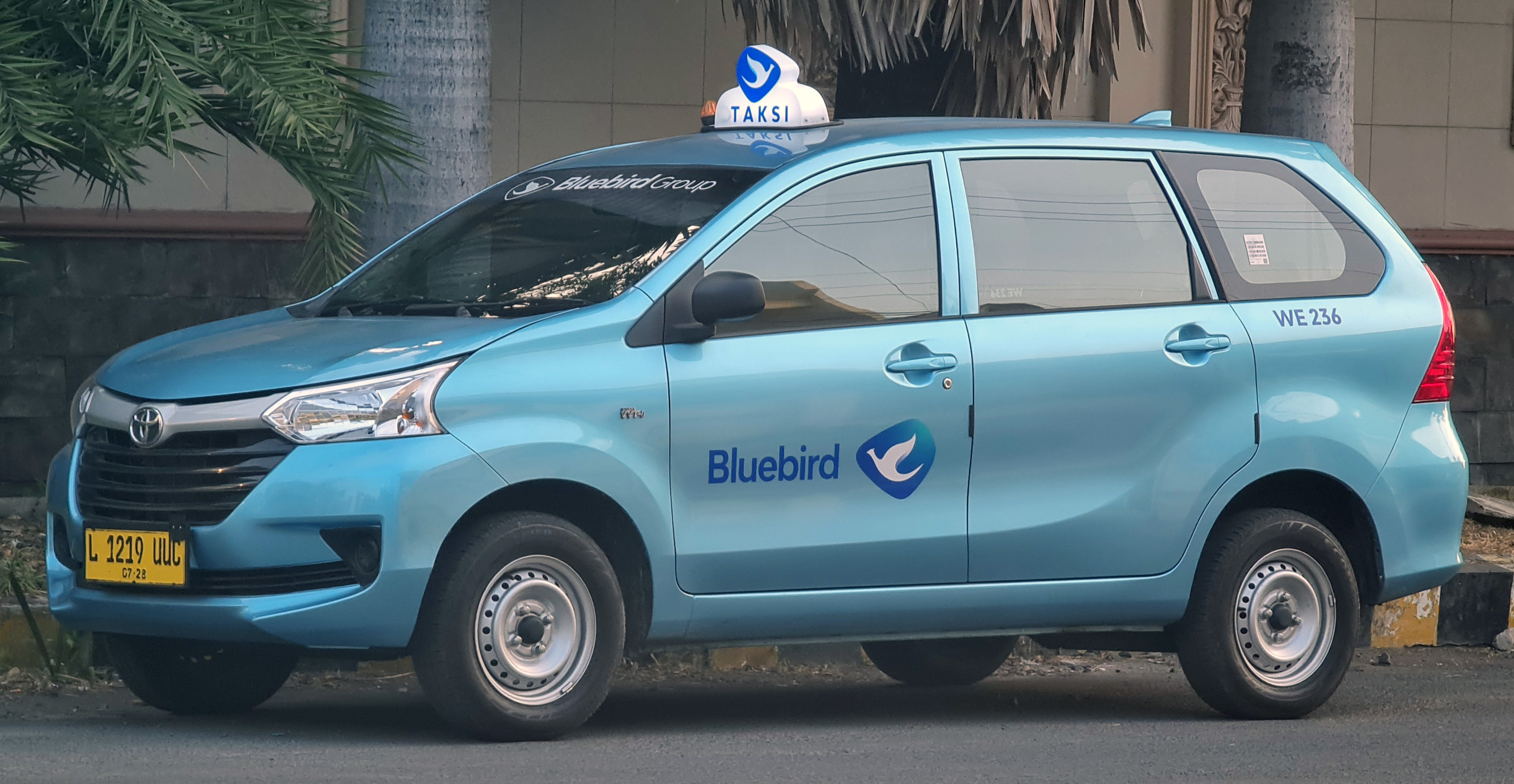
Toyota Transmover (F653), Bluebird livery

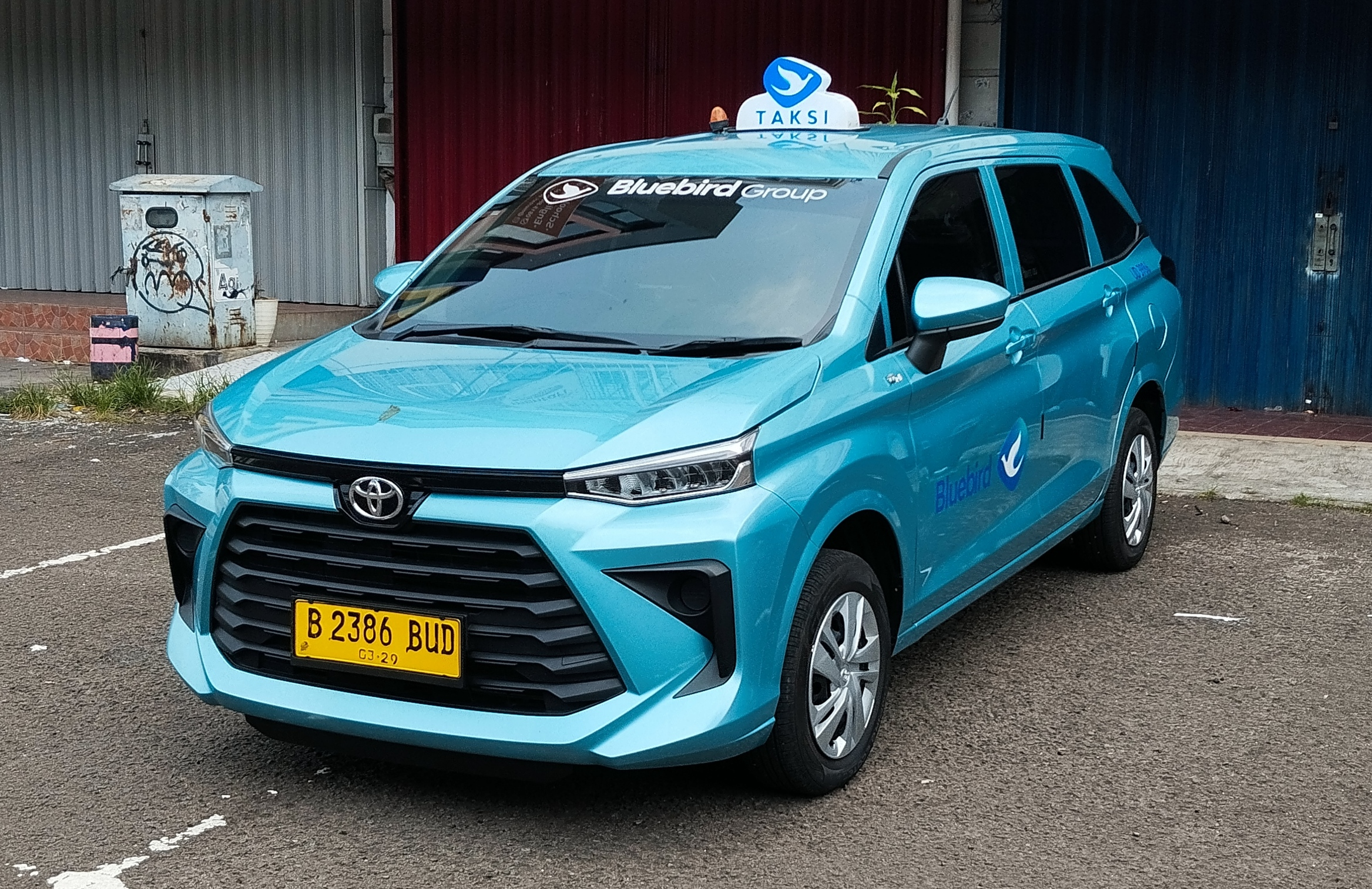
Toyota Transmover (W100), Bluebird livery

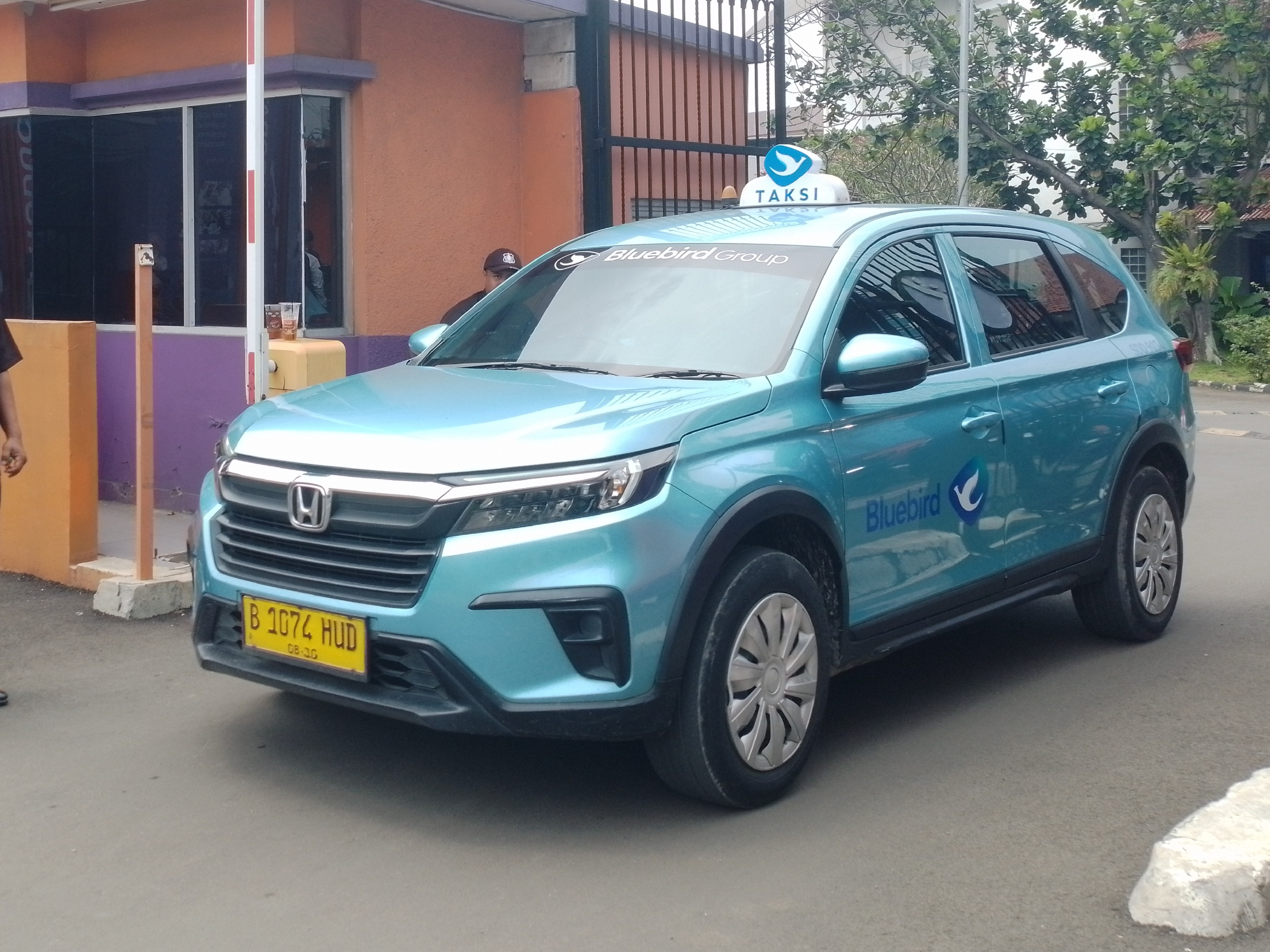
Honda BR-V (DG3), Bluebird livery

BYD e6 (MEE), Bluebird Prime livery

=== Bigbird ===
Bigbird (previously spelled as Big Bird) focuses on charter bus service. It was established on 15 December 1978, and started operations in 1979.

In November 2024, Bigbird was appointed by the government of Medan to operate Higer electric buses in the city as a part of the TransMedan electric bus project.

=== Silverbird ===
Silverbird (previously spelled as Silver Bird) focuses on executive taxis. It was first started operations in 1993, originally dating back to Bluebird's involvement in the 10th Summit of the Non-Aligned Movement in September 1992. It is the first executive taxi service to be operated in Indonesia.

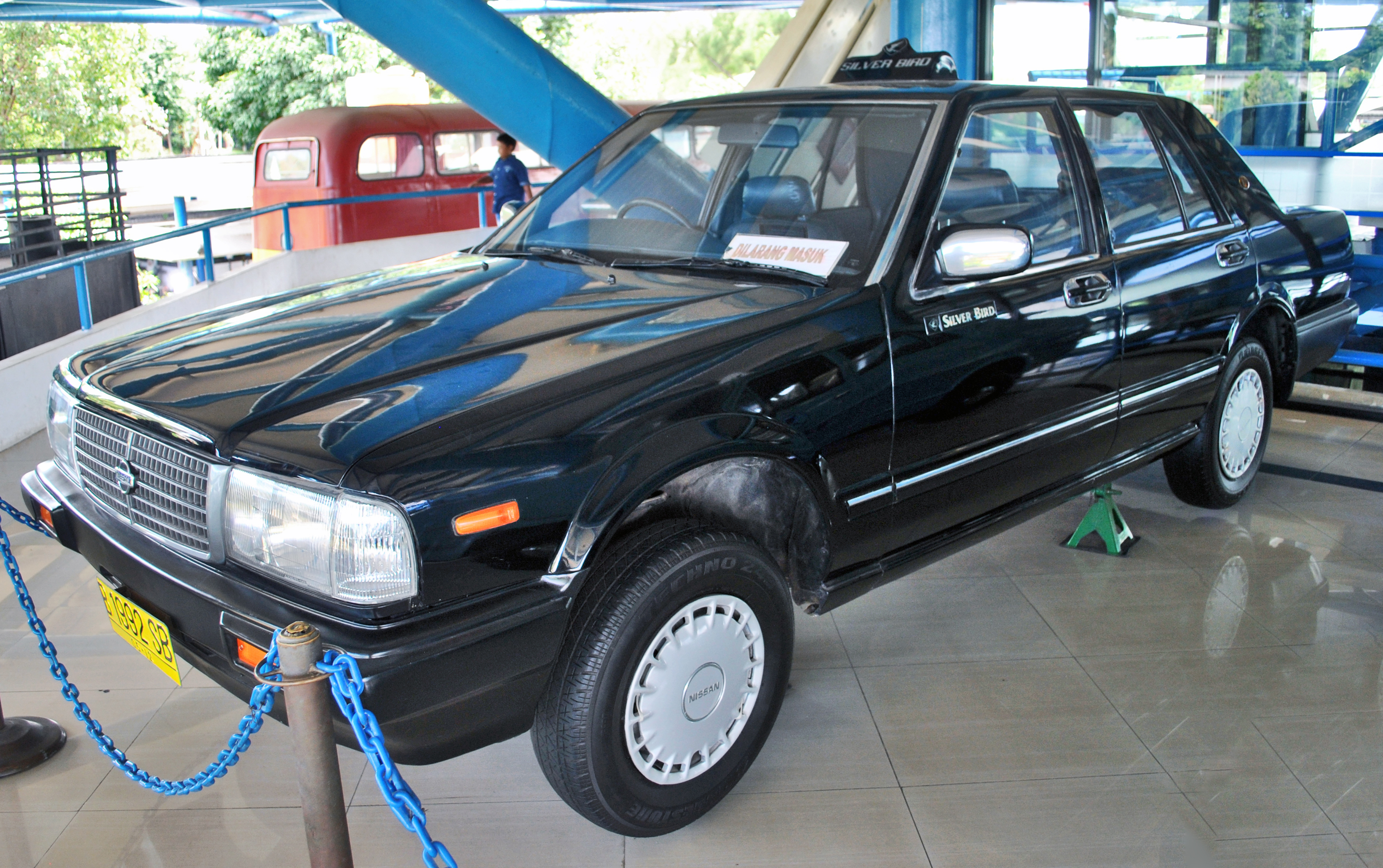
Nissan Cedric (Y31), the first Silver Bird taxicab

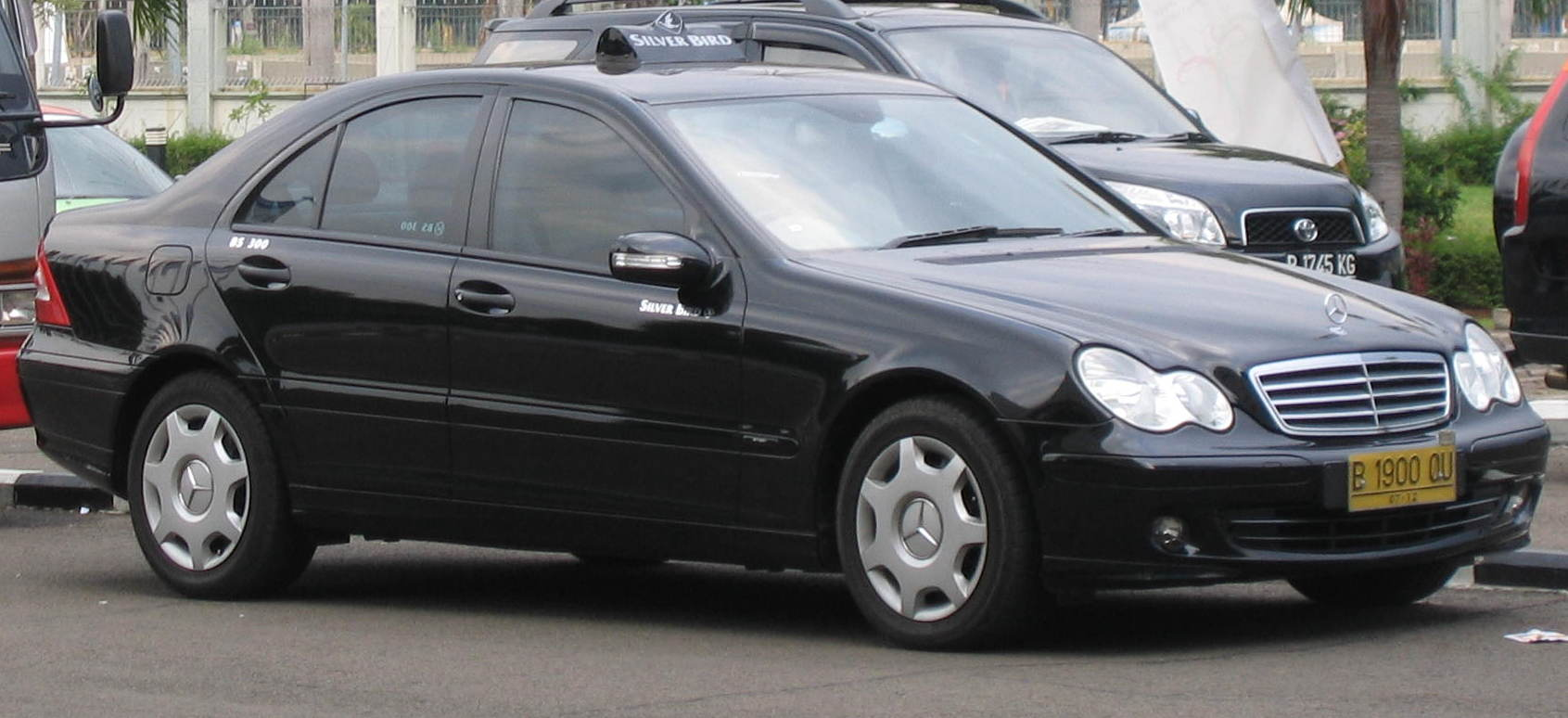
Mercedes-Benz C-Class (W203), old Silver Bird livery

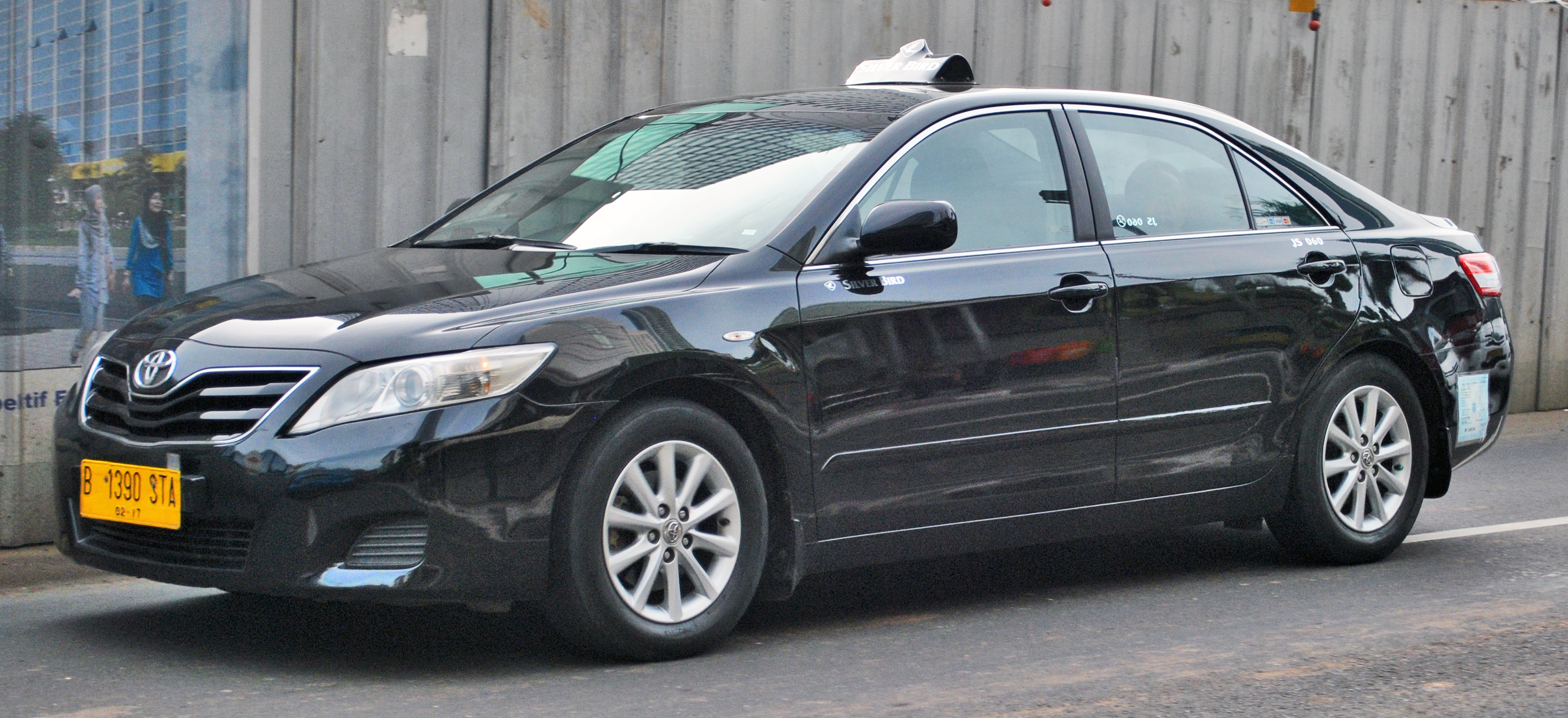
Toyota Camry (XV40), old Silver Bird livery

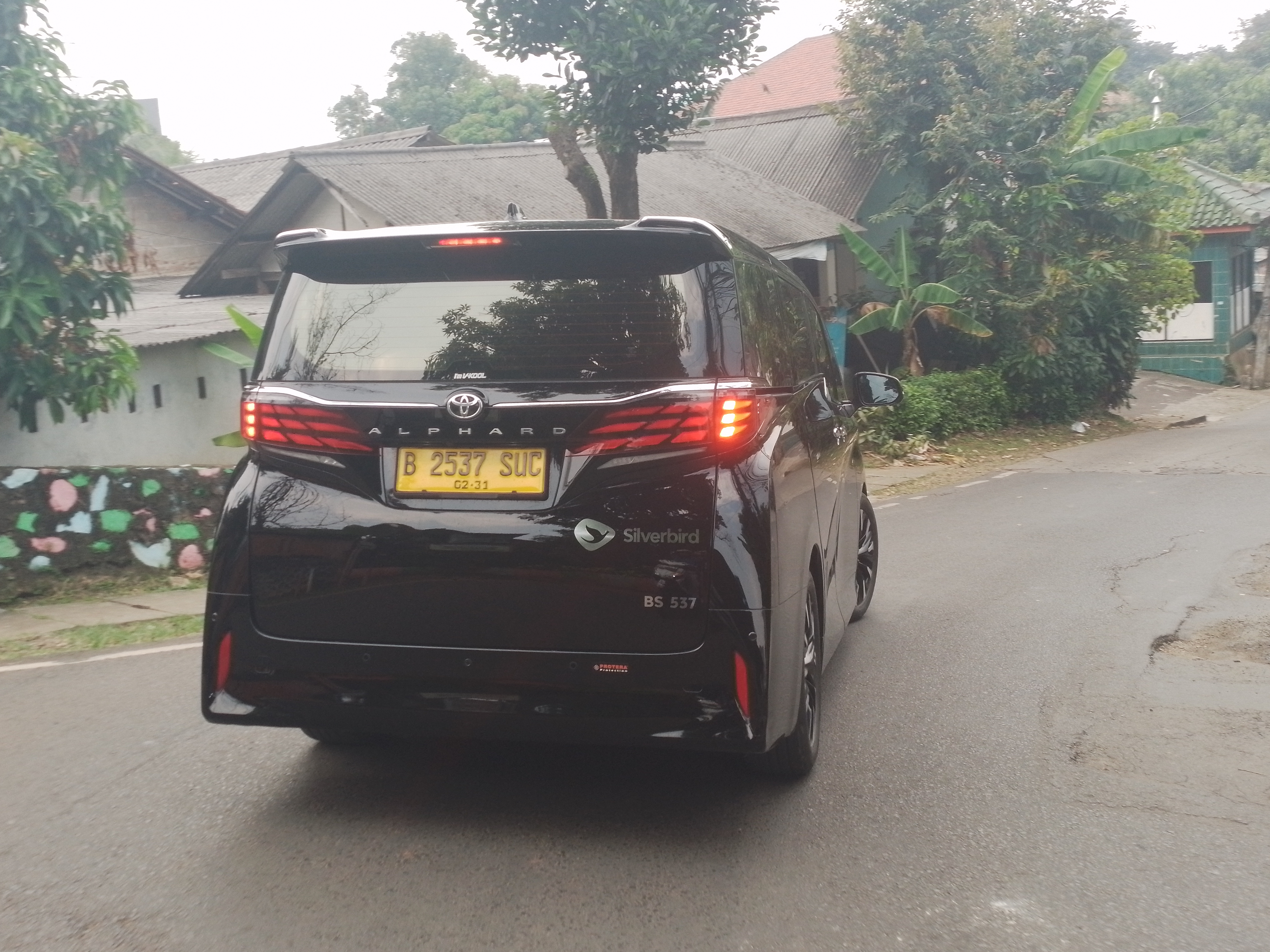
Toyota Alphard (AH40), Silverbird livery

=== Ironbird ===
Ironbird (previously spelled as Iron Bird) focuses on logistics. It was established in 1993.

=== Goldenbird ===
Goldenbird (previously spelled as Golden Bird) focuses on vehicle rental and driver services. It is the current name to the company's initial business prior to their establishment, Chandra Taksi.

=== Cititrans ===
Cititrans is a premium intercity shuttle and logistics service in Indonesia that has been a subsidiary of the Blue Bird Group since March 2019. Originally founded in 2005 in Bandung, it is widely recognized as a pioneer in the "executive shuttle" segment, offering high-end, point-to-point (or pool-to-pool) transportation.

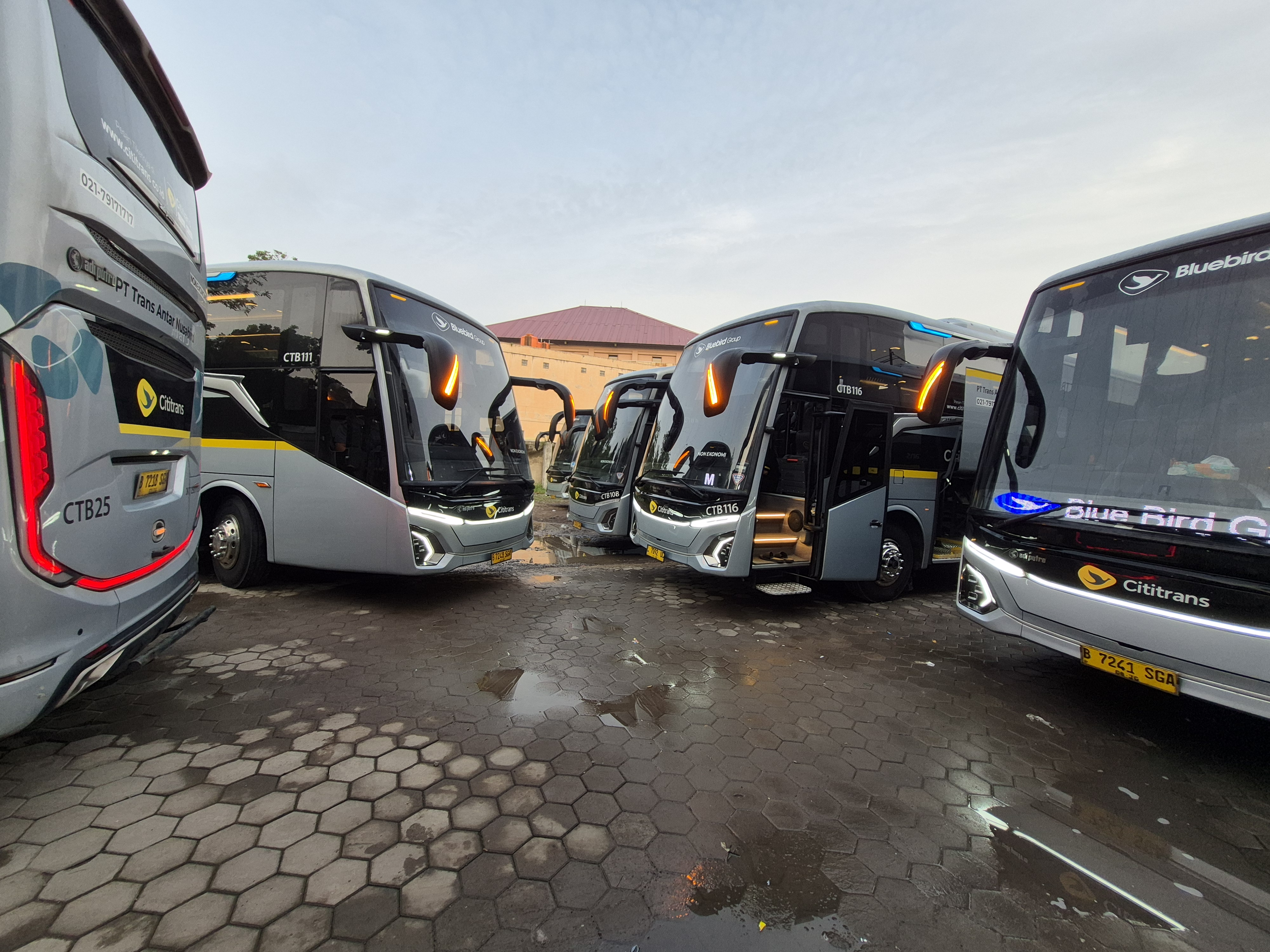
The Cititrans Busline fleet, featuring the Hino RM280 Jetbus 5, is stationed at the Suci pool in Bandung.

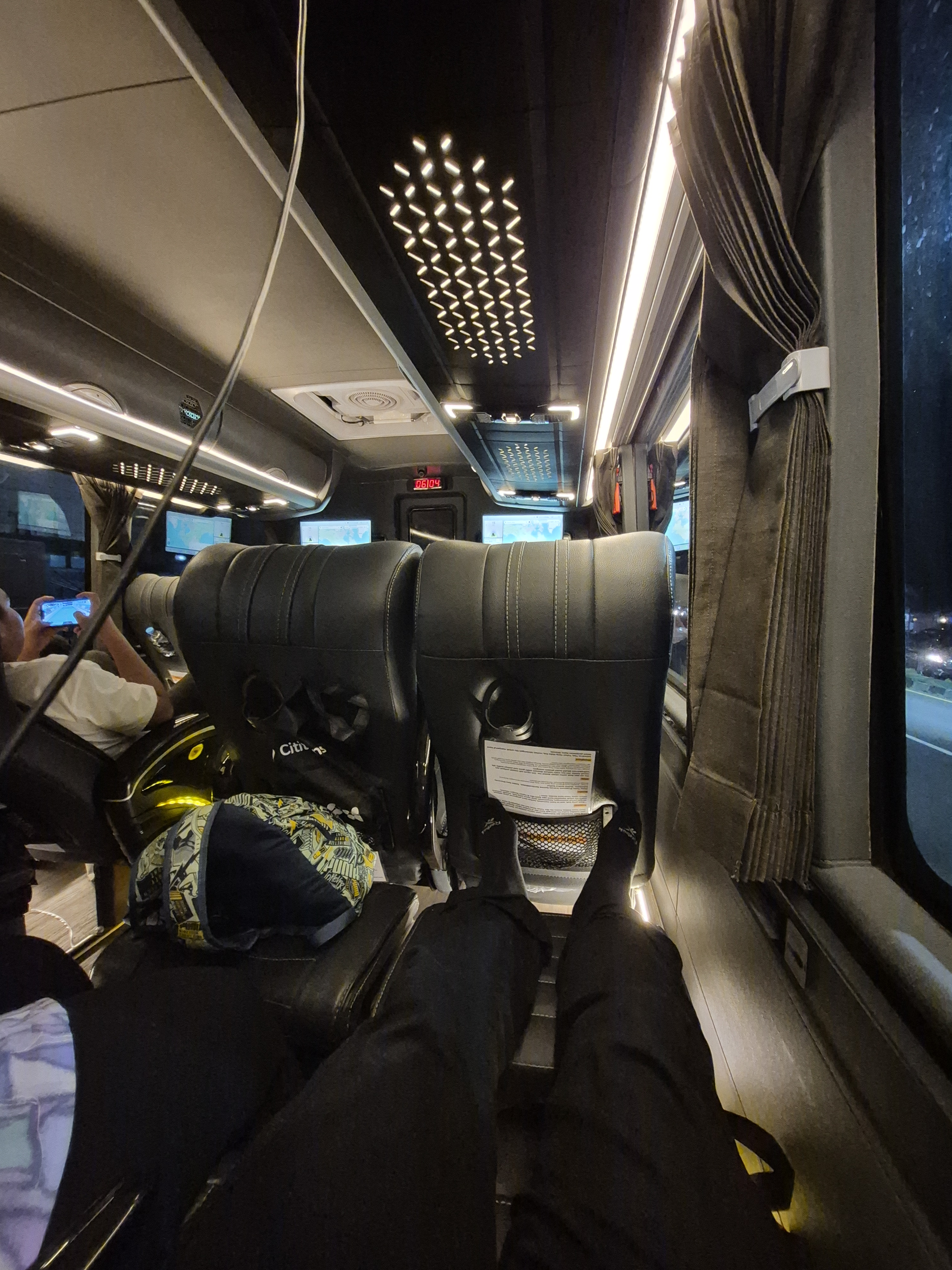
Seat 12 on the Cititrans Super Executive 28S Jetbus 5 by Adiputro.

=== Birdmobil ===
Birdmobil (stylized as BirdMobil) was launched on 30 August 2023. It focuses on marketing used passenger vehicles, including retired Bluebird, Silverbird and Goldenbird cars. Prior to its establishment, Bluebird Group initially only offered used vehicles that were phased out from one of their business units after four- to five-years in service under their own entity.

=== Other ventures ===
In April 2025, Pusaka Satria Utama (PSU), one of Bluebird's parent companies, entered the public bus system in Jakarta, operating Minitrans city buses for Transjakarta.

== Gallery ==
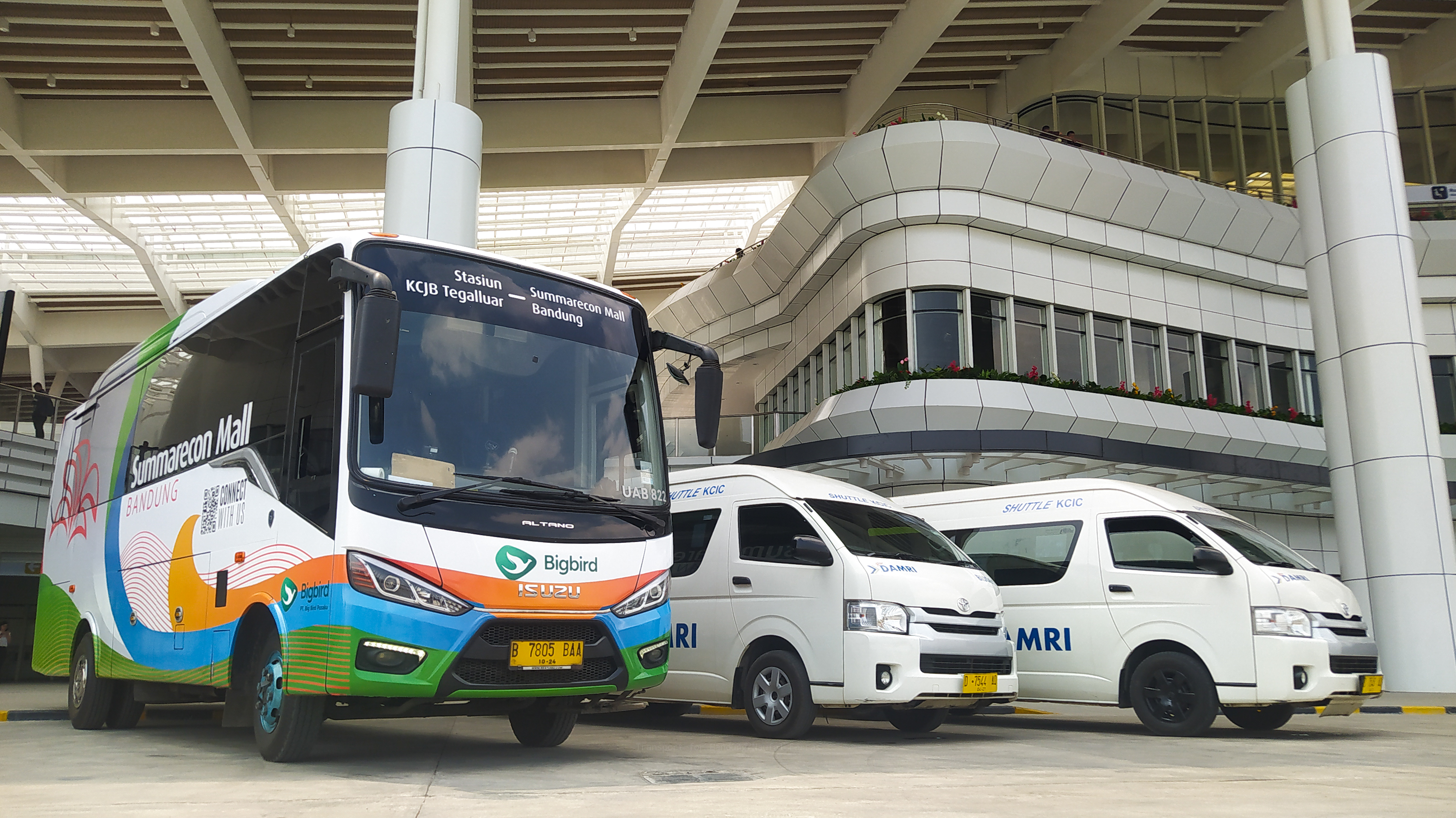
A Big Bird shuttle bus parked right next to two Damri Toyota Hiace shuttle vans at the Tegalluar Station in Bandung
