= Halim railway station =

High-speed rail and LRT station in Indonesia

Halim Station Stasiun Halim
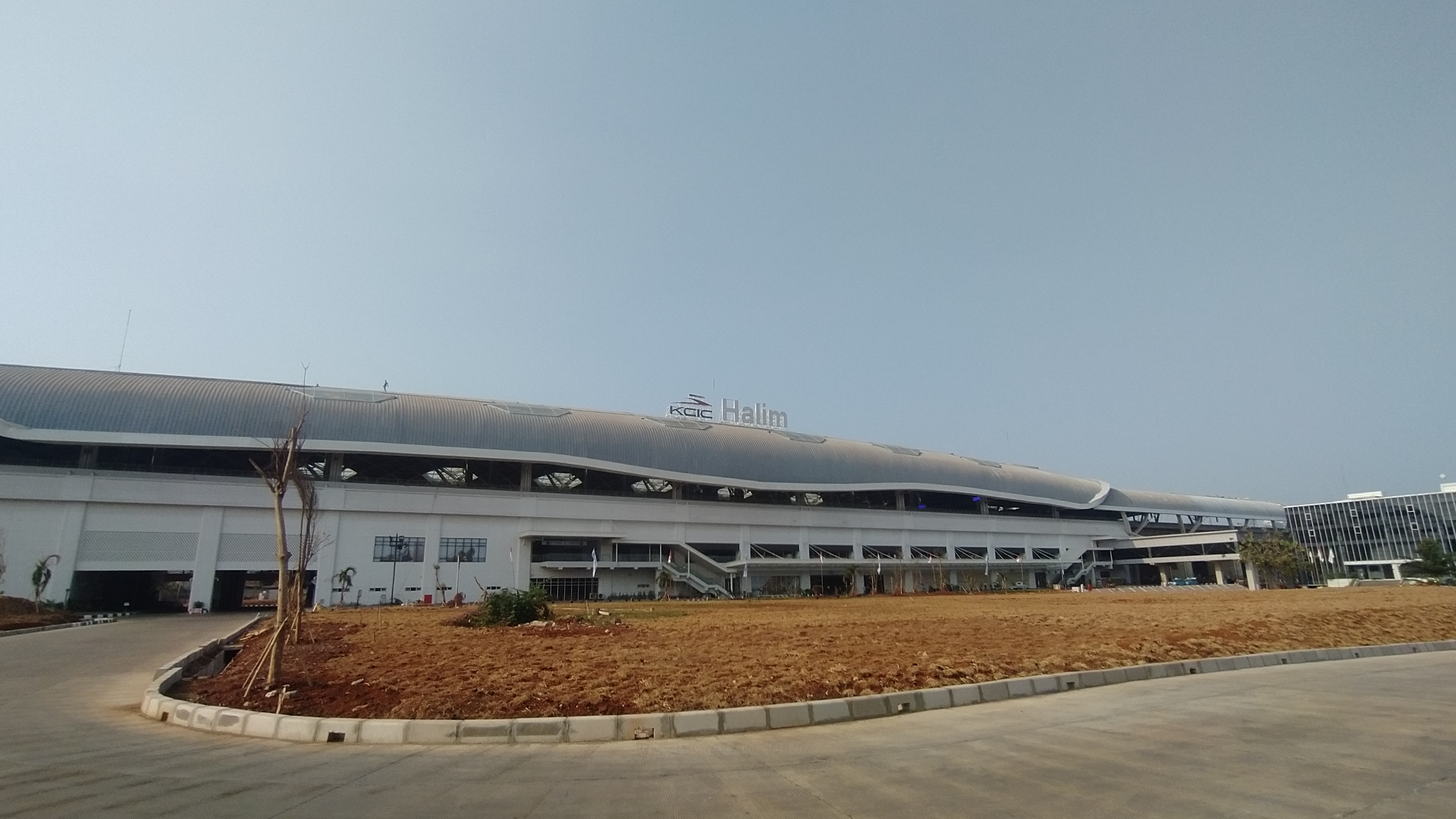
- Halim HSR Station

General information
- Location: Makasar, East Jakarta; Jakarta; Indonesia
- Coordinates: 6.2464709°S 106.8852410°E
- Elevation: 28.541 m (93.64 ft)
- System: High-speed rail station
- Owner: Pilar Sinergi BUMN Indonesia and Beijing Yawan HSR Co. Ltd.
- Operator: Kereta Cepat Indonesia China
- Platforms: 3 island platforms
- Tracks: 6
- Connections: Halim LRT station

Construction
- Structure type: Elevated
- Parking: Available
- Accessible: Available

Other information
- Status: Operational
- Station code: HLM

History
- Opened: 17 October 2023
- Electrified: 2023

Services
Preceding station	KCIC	Following station
Terminus	Jakarta–Bandung high-speed railway	Karawang towards Tegalluar
Location

BK09 Halim
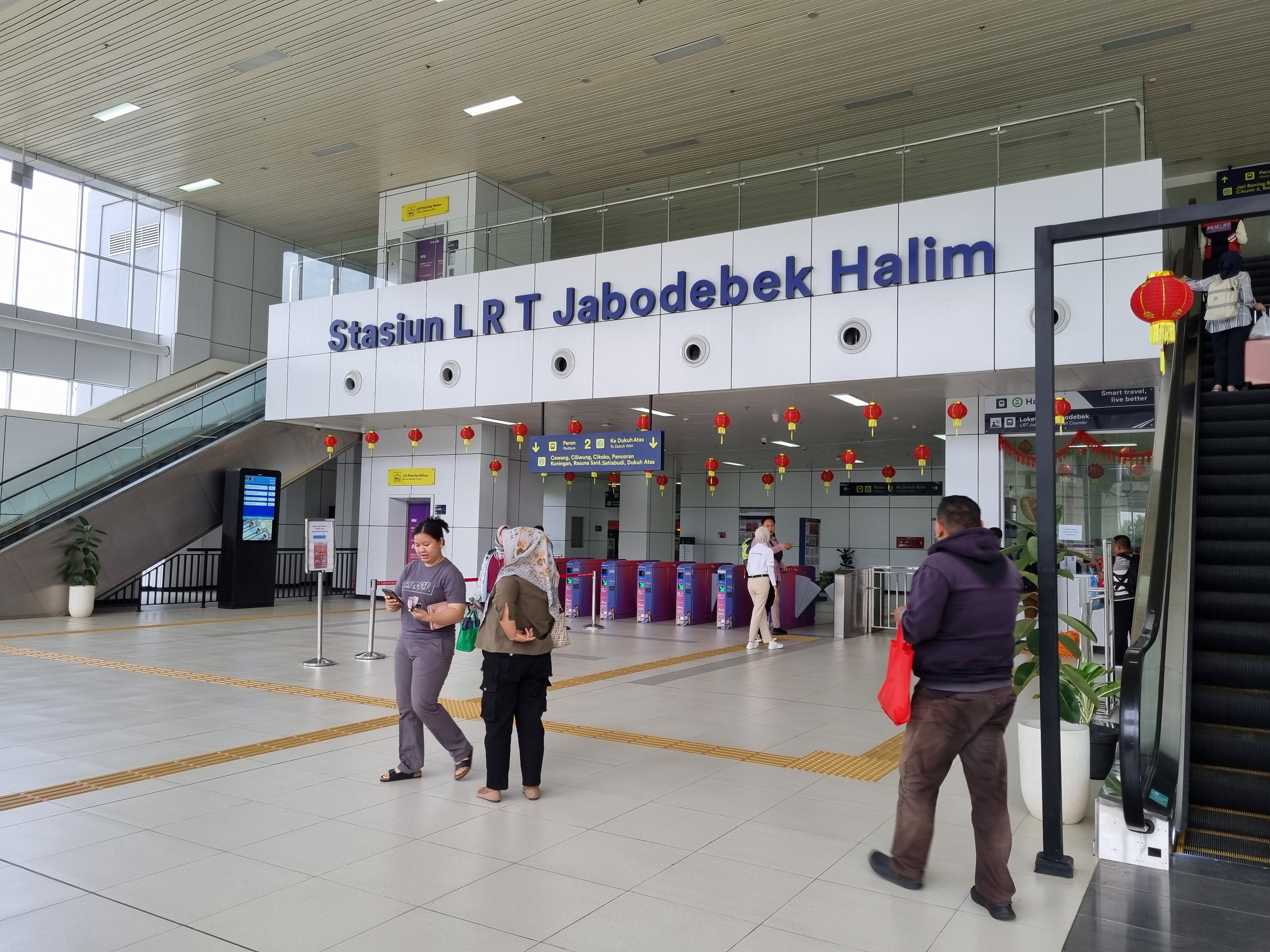
- Entrance to the LRT station

General information
- System: Jabodebek LRT
- Owner: Ministry of Transportation via the Directorate General of Railways
- Manager: Kereta Api Indonesia
- Line: Bekasi Line
- Platforms: 2 side platforms
- Tracks: 2
- Connections: Halim HSR station

Construction
- Structure type: Elevated
- Accessible: Yes

Other information
- Station code: HAL

History
- Opened: 28 August 2023
- Electrified: 2019

Services
Preceding station		Following station
Cawang towards Dukuh Atas BNI	Bekasi Line	Jati Bening Baru towards Jati Mulya
Location

Halim Station is a railway station complex located on Makasar, East Jakarta, Jakarta, Indonesia. The complex serves the Jakarta-Bandung high-speed railway of Kereta Cepat Indonesia China (KCIC) and the Jabodebek LRT Bekasi Line of Kereta Api Indonesia (KAI). The complex consists of two separate elevated stations connected via pedestrian bridge.

The station's name is taken from Halim Perdanakusuma International Airport south of the station, itself is named after the pilot and national hero of Indonesia Halim Perdanakusuma.

== Station buildings ==
=== High-speed railway station ===
Halim HSR Station is a high-speed railway station, only serves the KCIC Jakarta-Bandung high-speed rail route. It is located on the north side of the complex.

Halim
2nd floor	Line 6	← (Karawang)	Jakarta–Bandung HSR to Tegalluar Summarecon
2nd floor	Island platform, the doors are opened on the right side or the left side
2nd floor	Line 5	← (Karawang)	Jakarta–Bandung HSR to Tegalluar Summarecon
2nd floor	Line 4	← (Karawang)	Jakarta–Bandung HSR to Tegalluar Summarecon
2nd floor	Island platform, the doors are opened on the right side or the left side
2nd floor	Line 3	← (Karawang)	Jakarta–Bandung HSR to Tegalluar Summarecon
2nd floor	Line 2	← (Karawang)	Jakarta–Bandung HSR to Tegalluar Summarecon
2nd floor	Side platform, the doors are opened on the right side
2nd floor	Line 1	← (Karawang)	Jakarta–Bandung HSR to Tegalluar Summarecon
1st floor	Concourse	Ticket gates, ticket vending machines, retail kiosks, and transfer access to the LRT station
Ground floor	Street	Entrance and exit, drop-off area, ticket vending machines, customer service/counter, and retail kiosks

=== LRT station ===
Halim LRT station is a large class-A type light rapid transit station located on the south side of the complex. The station, which is located at an elevation of 28.541 meters, only serves the Bekasi Line of the Jabodebek LRT.

In addition to Jabodebek LRT services, there are also plans to extend the Jakarta LRT Line 1 to this station. The Jakarta LRT station is planned to be in a separate building, namely to the north of Halim HSR Station.

Unlike other Jabodebek LRT stations, there is no paid area connecting the two side platforms, so passengers have to tap out first before changing direction, although passengers can ask the staff to cross between.

BK09 Halim
2nd floor	Mezzanine, retail area, and inter platform crossing
1st floor	Side platform, the doors are opened on the right side
1st floor	Line 1	← (Jati Bening Baru)	Bekasi Line to Jati Mulya
1st floor	Line 2		Bekasi Line to Dukuh Atas BNI	(Cawang) →
1st floor	Side platform, the doors are opened on the right side
1st floor	Ticket gates, ticket machines, counters, and transit access to HSR station

== Supporting transportation ==
Type	Station	Route	Destination
Transjakarta	St Kereta Cepat Halim (Bus stop)		Cawang–Halim HSR Station
JA Connexion (Perum DAMRI)	St Kereta Cepat Halim (Bus stop)	–	Halim Station–Soekarno–Hatta International Airport

== Incidents ==
On the predawn of 11 September 2023, a fire occurred at the Halim HSR Station roof, and seven firetrucks were deployed to extinguish the fire. It was reported that the sparks emerged on the temporary coating roof slab, while the other parts of the roof are incombustible.

== Gallery ==
High-speed rail

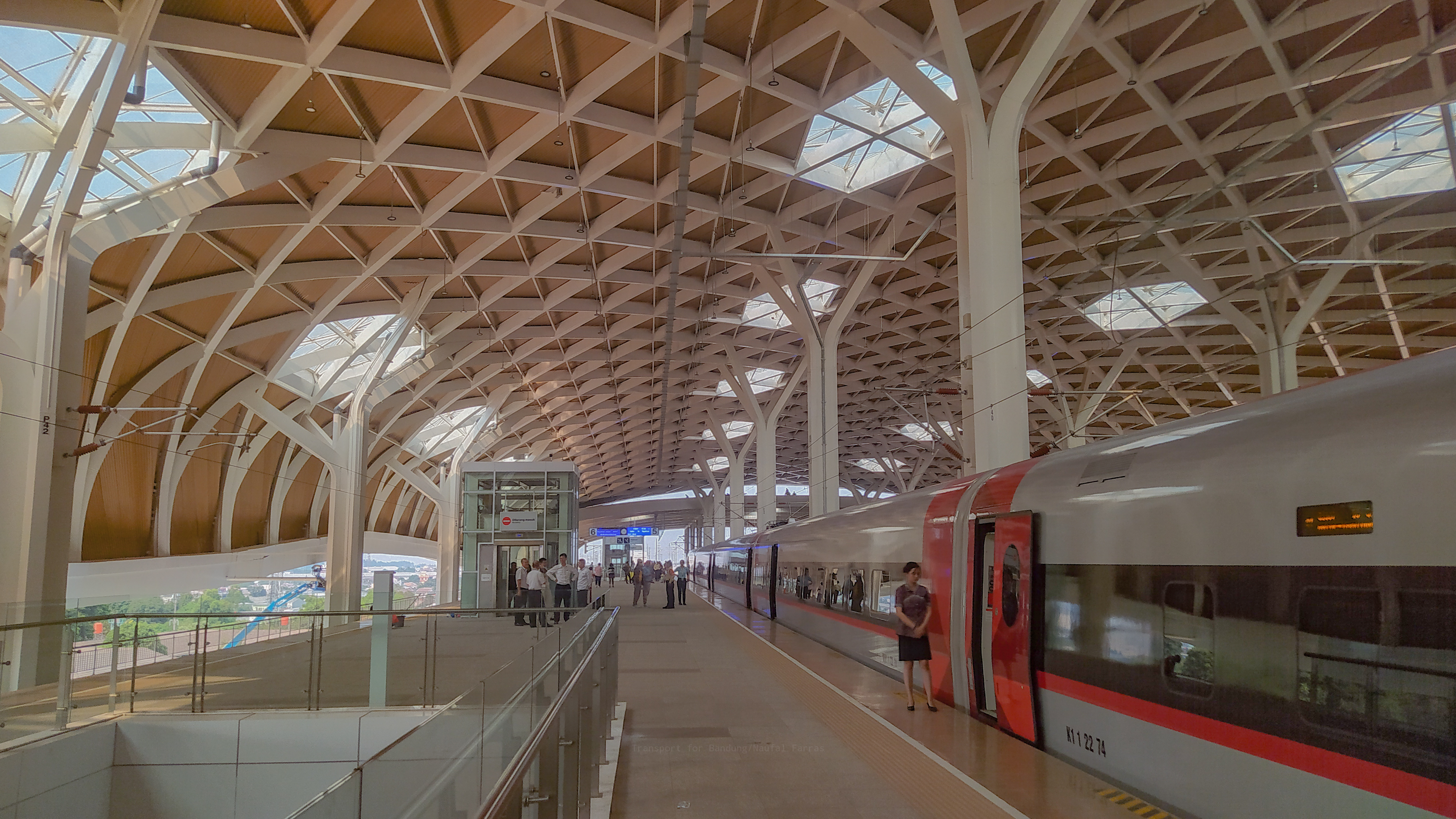
Halim HSR station platform interior

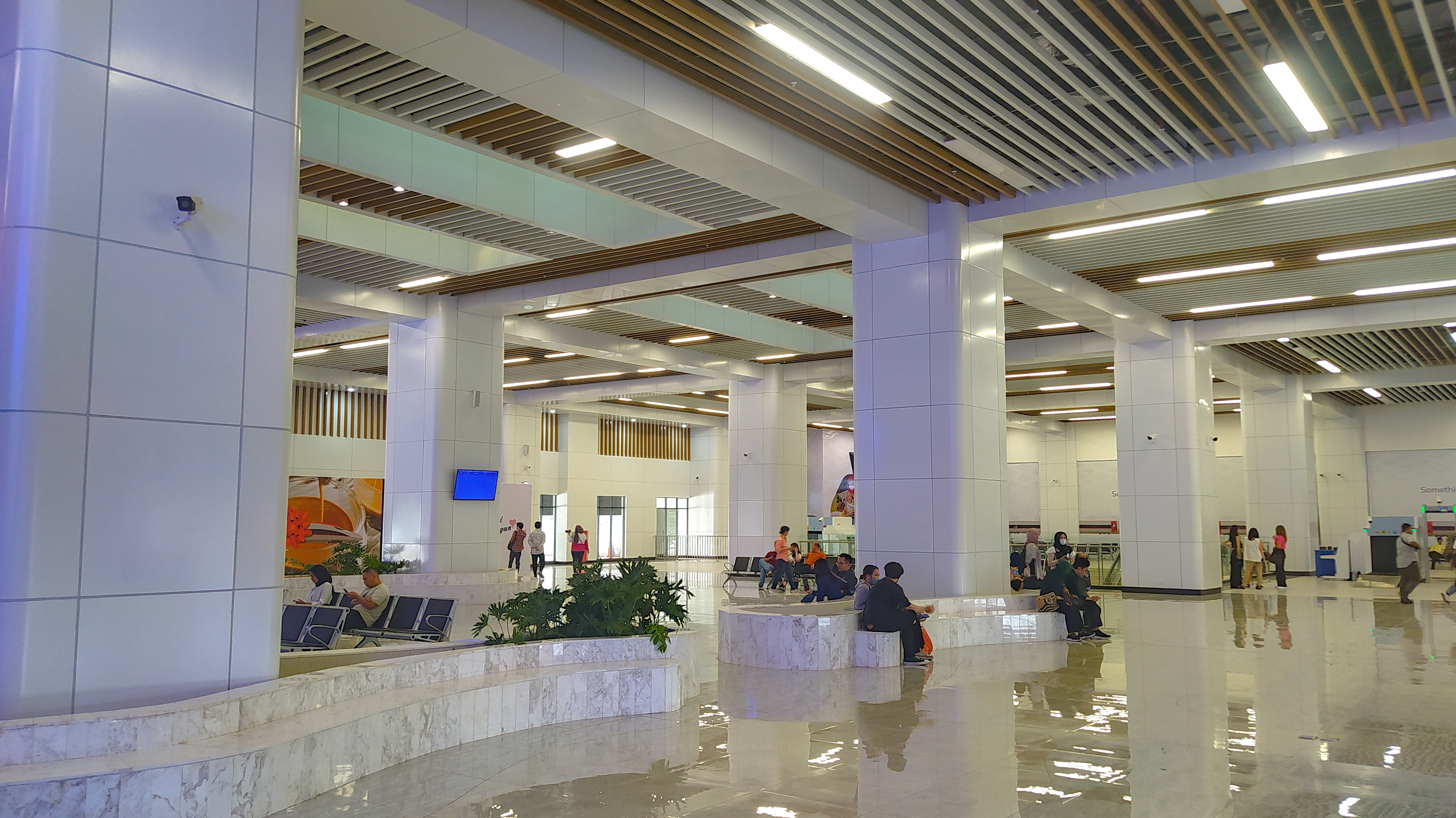
Waiting area in Halim HSR station

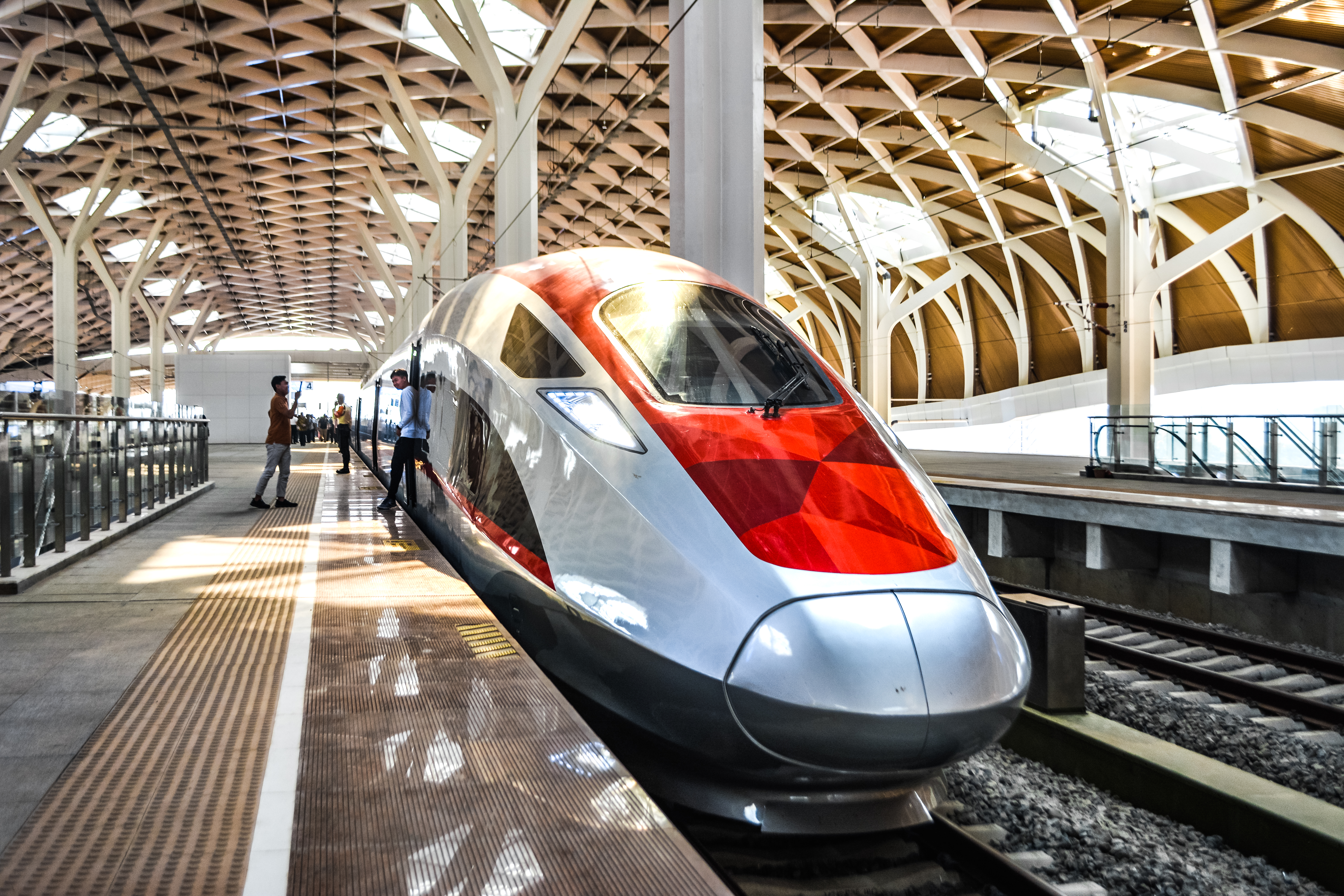
Whoosh series 400 at Halim station

Jabodebek LRT

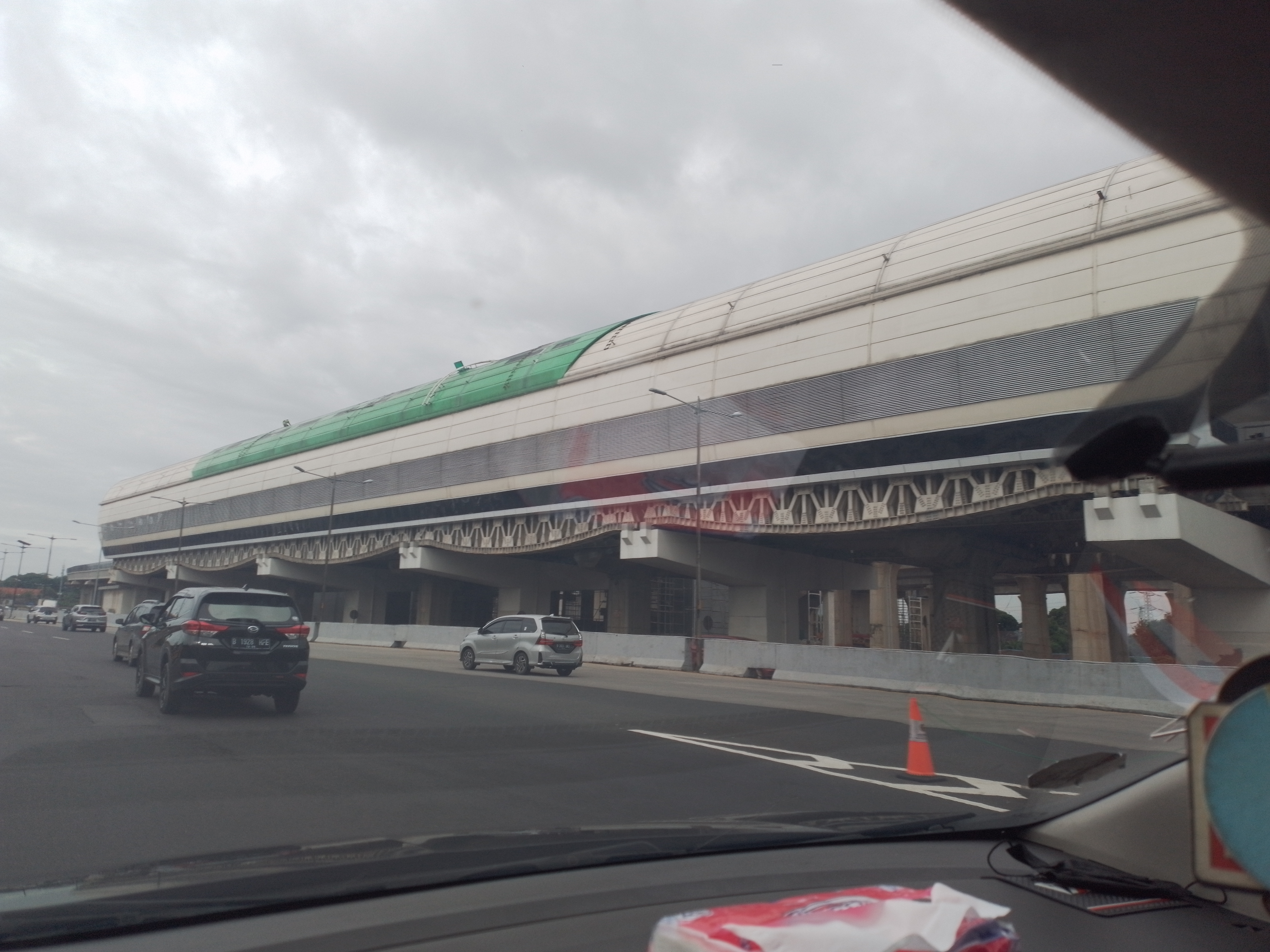
The LRT station building seen from the Jakarta Inner Ring Road

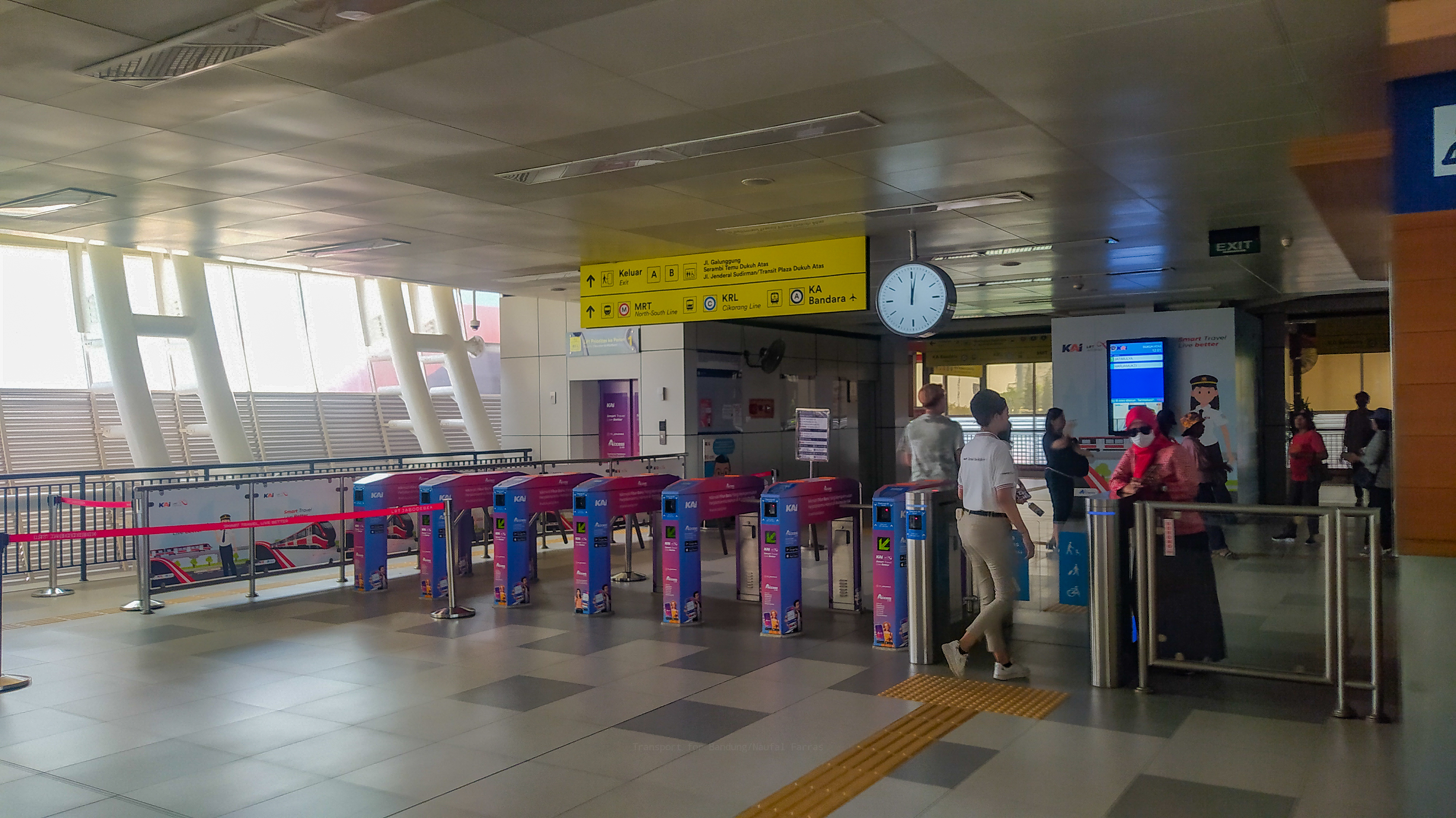
Fare gates at the LRT station

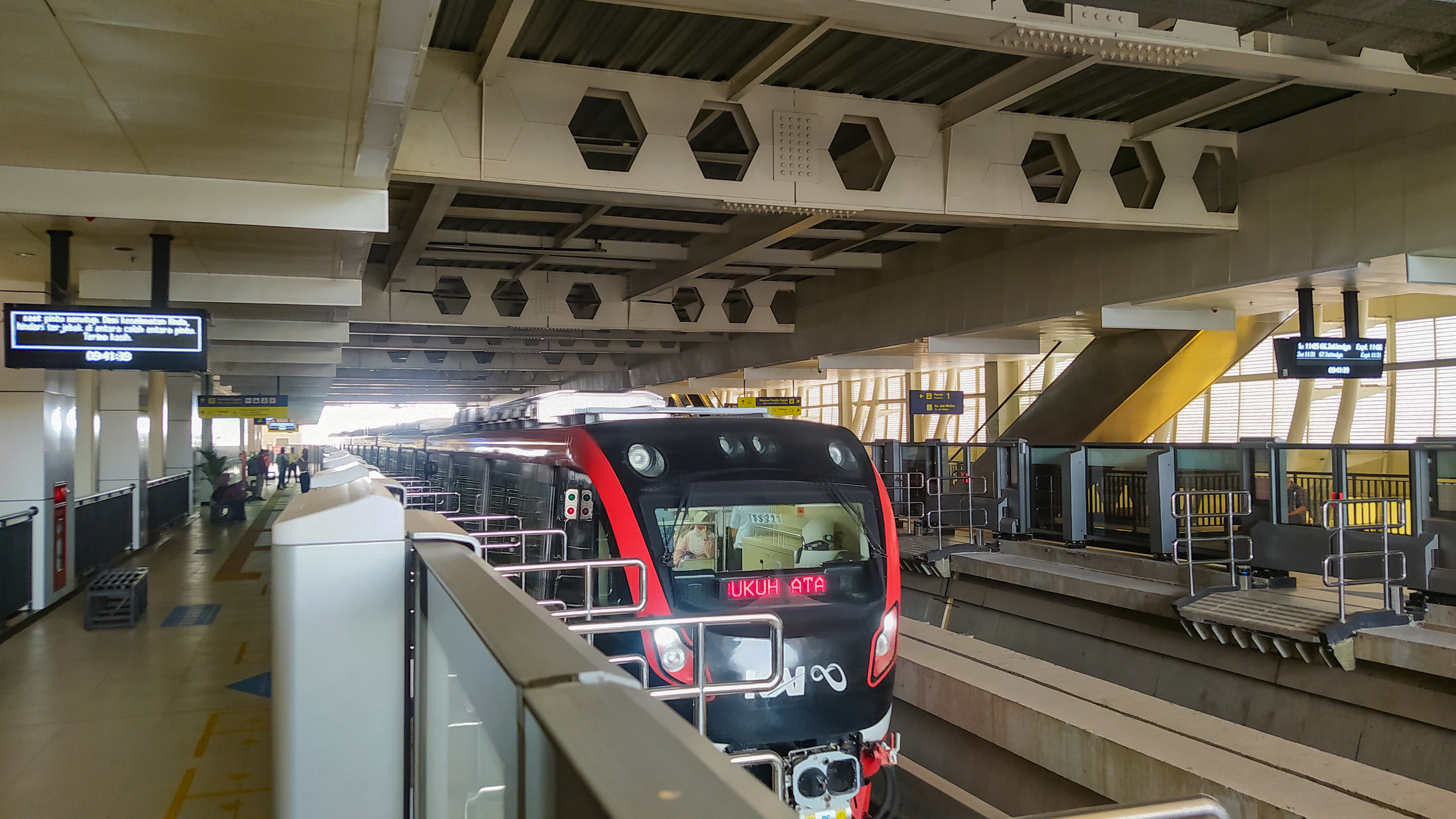
The Jabodebek LRT trainset arriving at the LRT station
