= Tegalluar railway station =

High-speed railway station in Indonesia

Tegalluar Summarecon Station Stasiun Tegalluar Summarecon
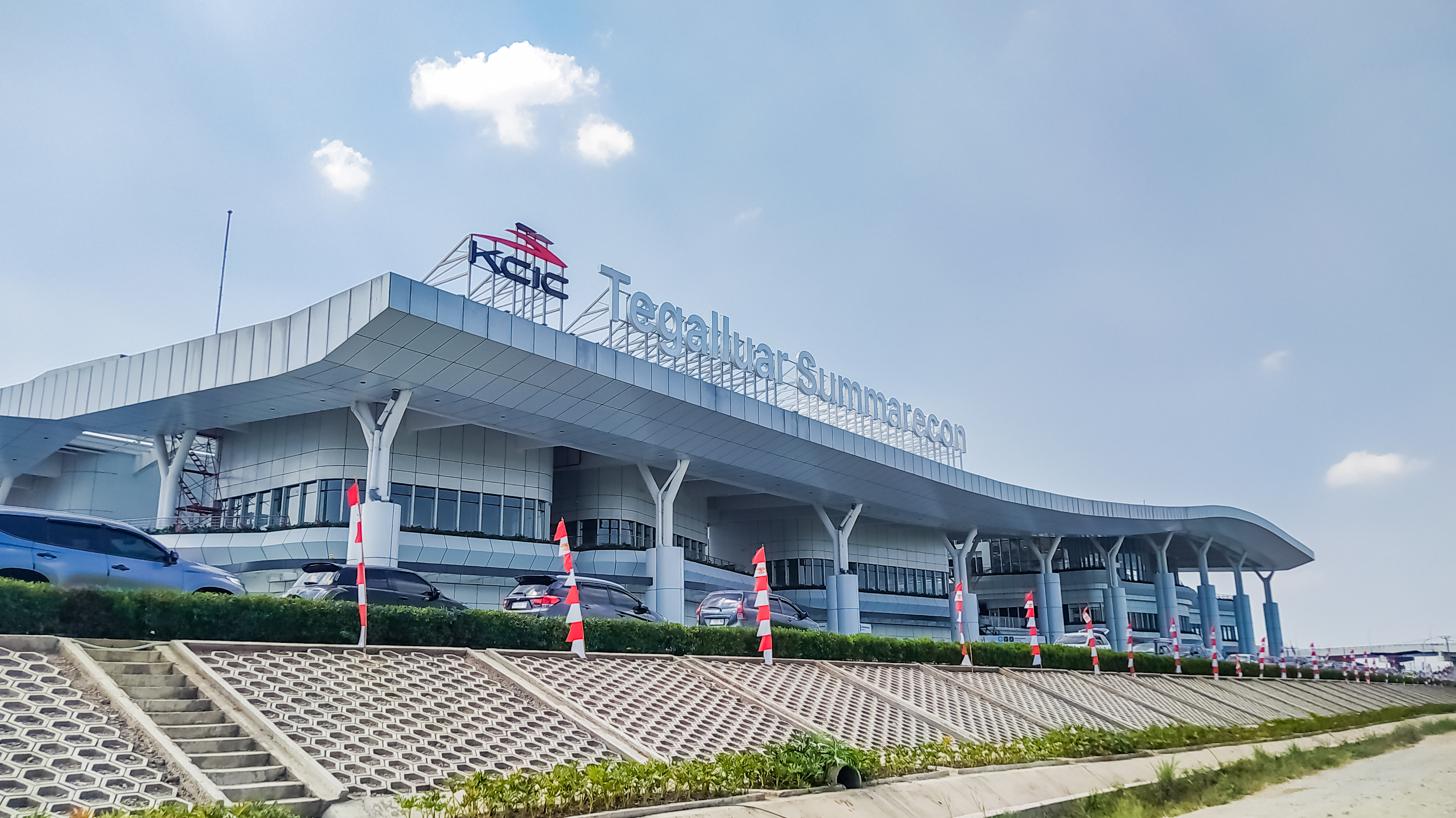
- Southwest view of the station

General information
- Other names: Tegalluar Station
- Location: Jalan Desa Tegalluar, Cibiru Hilir; Bandung Regency, West Java; Indonesia
- Coordinates: 6.964230°S 107.712516°E
- Elevation: 52.2 m (171 ft)
- System: High-speed rail station
- Owner: Pilar Sinergi BUMN Indonesia; Beijing Yawan HSR Co. Ltd.
- Operator: Kereta Cepat Indonesia China
- Platforms: 2 island platforms
- Tracks: 4

Construction
- Structure type: Embankment
- Parking: Available
- Accessible: Available

Other information
- Status: Operational
- Station code: HSR-TGL

History
- Opened: 17 October 2023
- Electrified: 2023

Services
Preceding station	KCIC	Following station
Padalarang towards Halim	Jakarta–Bandung high-speed railway	Terminus
Location

Tegalluar Summarecon Station, also known as Tegalluar Station, is a high-speed railway station located on Cibiru Hilir, Bandung Regency, West Java, Indonesia. Despite its name, this station is not located in Tegalluar village, but is northeast of the village. The station, which is located at an altitude of 52.2 meters, serves the KCIC Whoosh Jakarta-Bandung HSR route.

This station is also the nearest station to the Gelora Bandung Lautan Api Stadium, Al-Jabbar Grand Mosque, and the West Java Regional Police Headquarters.

== Naming rights ==
On 29 August 2024, the real estate company Summarecon Agung officially bought the naming rights of Tegalluar Station; where one of their projects is located nearby the station, namely Summarecon Bandung. However, many people and locals have retained to call it 'Tegalluar Station'.

== Station layout ==
This station have four tracks with two island platforms.

Tegalluar Summarecon
2nd floor	Ticket gate (entrance only), waiting room, and inter-platform crossing bridge
1st floor	Security check, ticket vending machines, and retail kiosks
Ground floor	Entrance and exit, ticket gates (exit only), security check, drop off area, ticket vending machines, customer service/counter, and retail kiosks
Ground floor	Line 1	Jakarta–Bandung HSR to Halim	(Padalarang) →
Ground floor	Island platform
Ground floor	Line 2	Jakarta–Bandung HSR to Halim	(Padalarang) →
Ground floor	Line 3	Jakarta–Bandung HSR to Halim	(Padalarang) →
Ground floor	Island platform
Ground floor	Line 4	Jakarta–Bandung HSR to Halim	(Padalarang) →
UG floor	Inter-platform access tunnel (for exit only)

== Supporting transportation ==
There are two shuttle bus routes to Tegalluar Station, each operated by Perum DAMRI and Bigbird, the subsidiary of the Blue Bird taxicab company.

- Tegalluar Station–DAMRI bus pool (on Jalan Soekarno–Hatta) via Gedebage Station, operated by Perum DAMRI
- Tegalluar Station–Summarecon Mall Bandung, operated by Bigbird

== Gallery ==
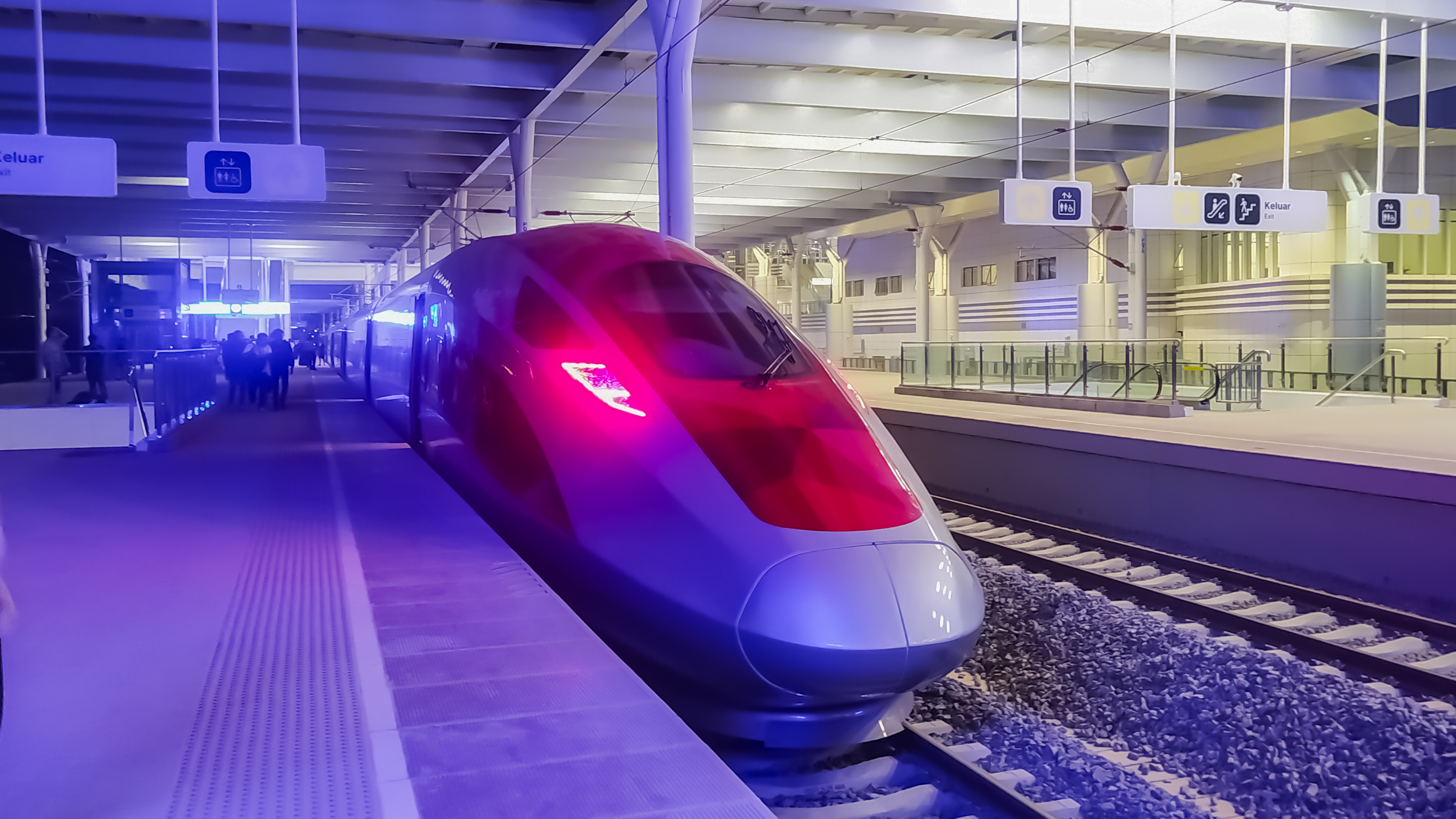
Whoosh high-speed train, terminating in Tegalluar at night

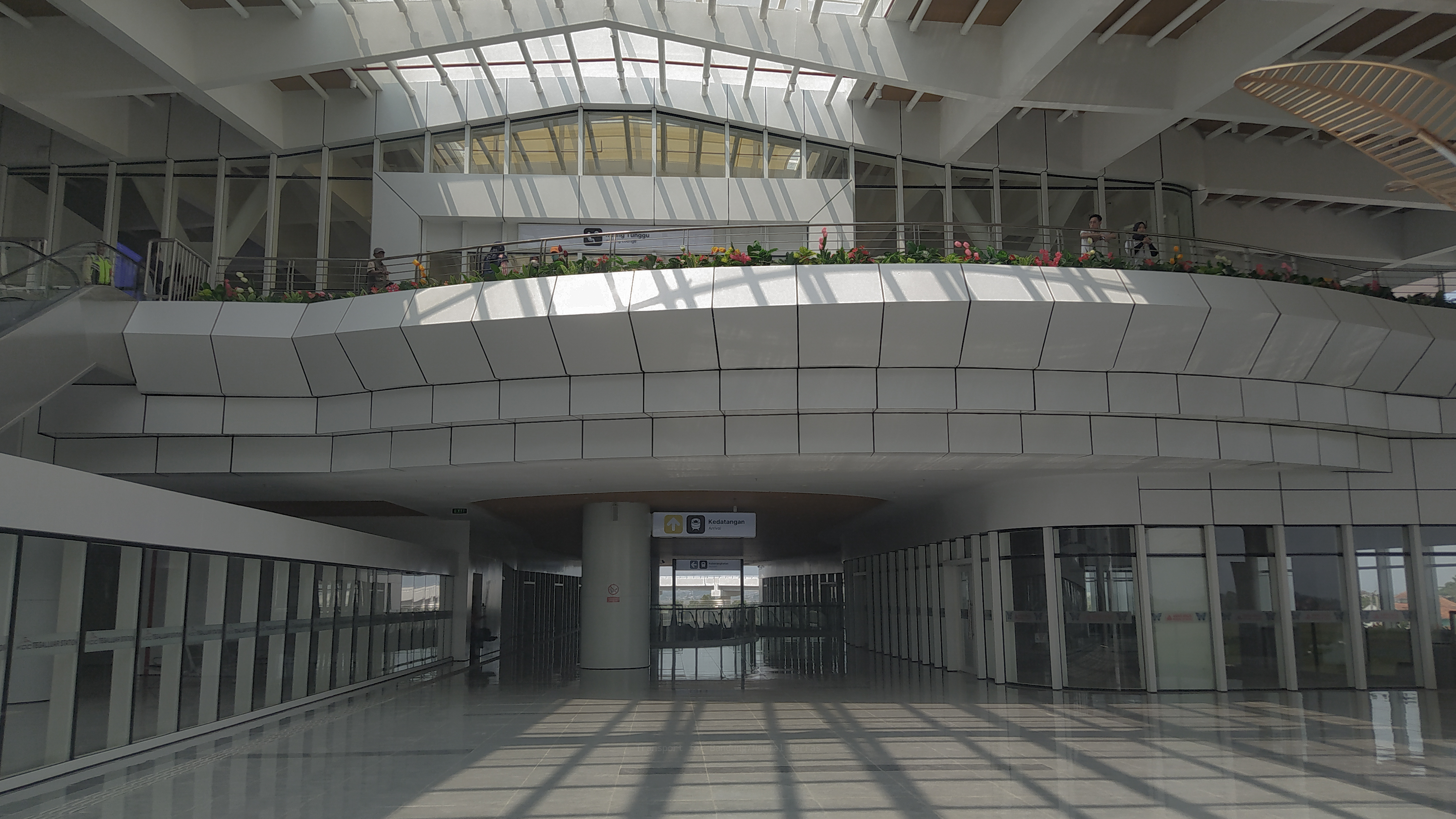
Second floor of Tegalluar Station

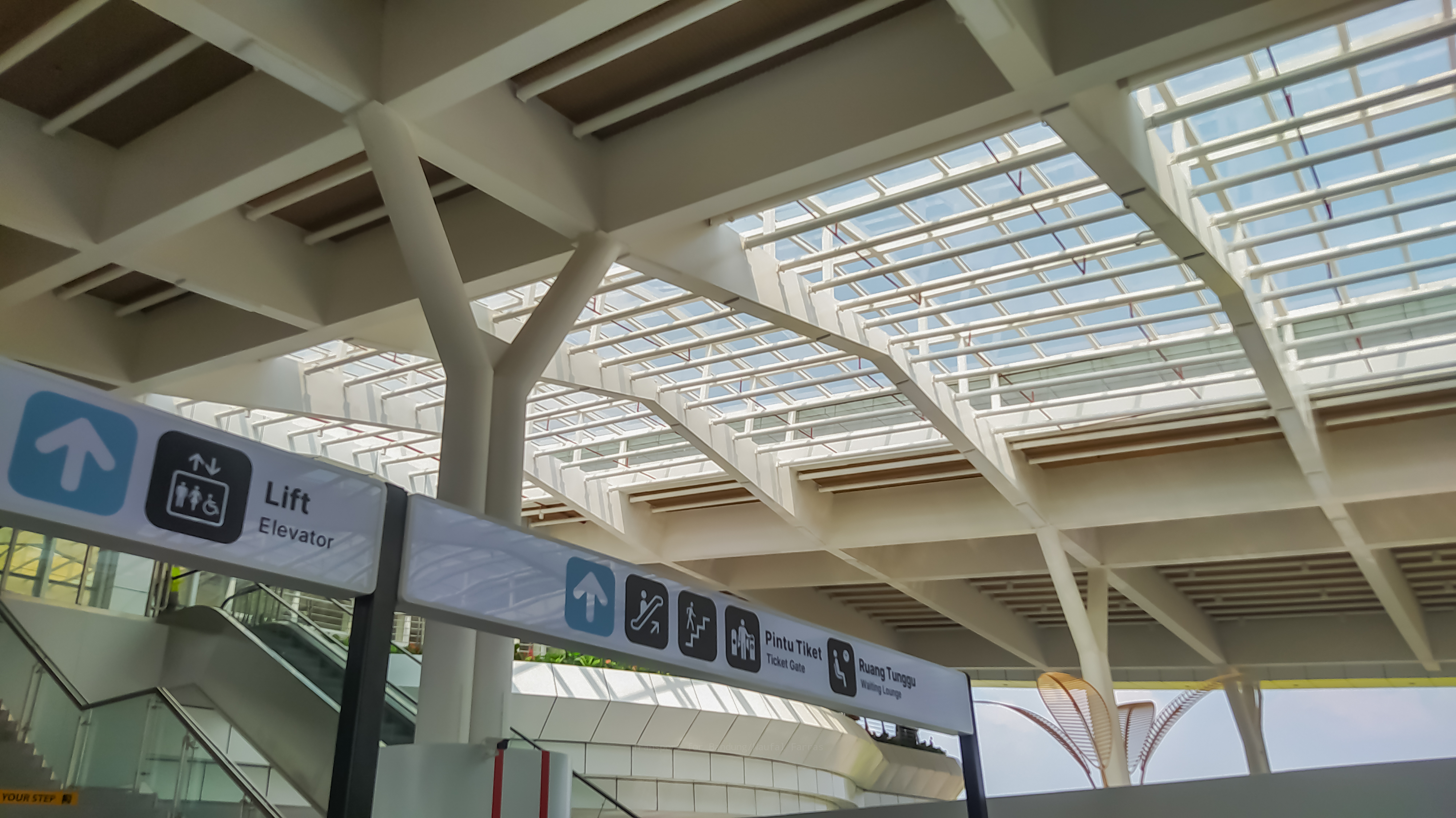
Escalators and Stairs to the station

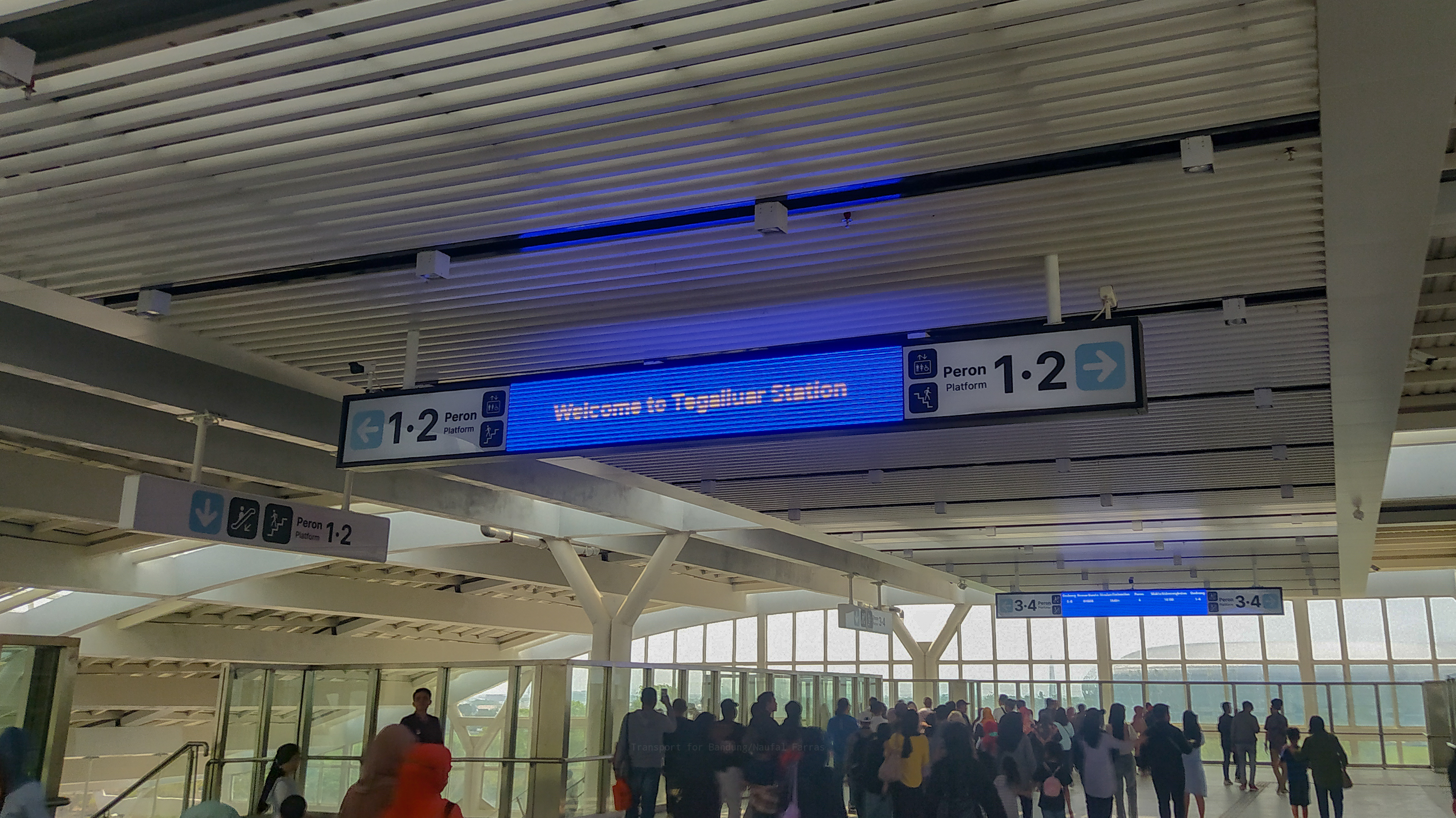
Skybridge of Tegalluar Station, connecting its building and platforms.
