= Yogyakarta International Airport railway station =

Railway station in Indonesia

YA04 Yogyakarta International Airport Station Stasiun Yogyakarta International Airport
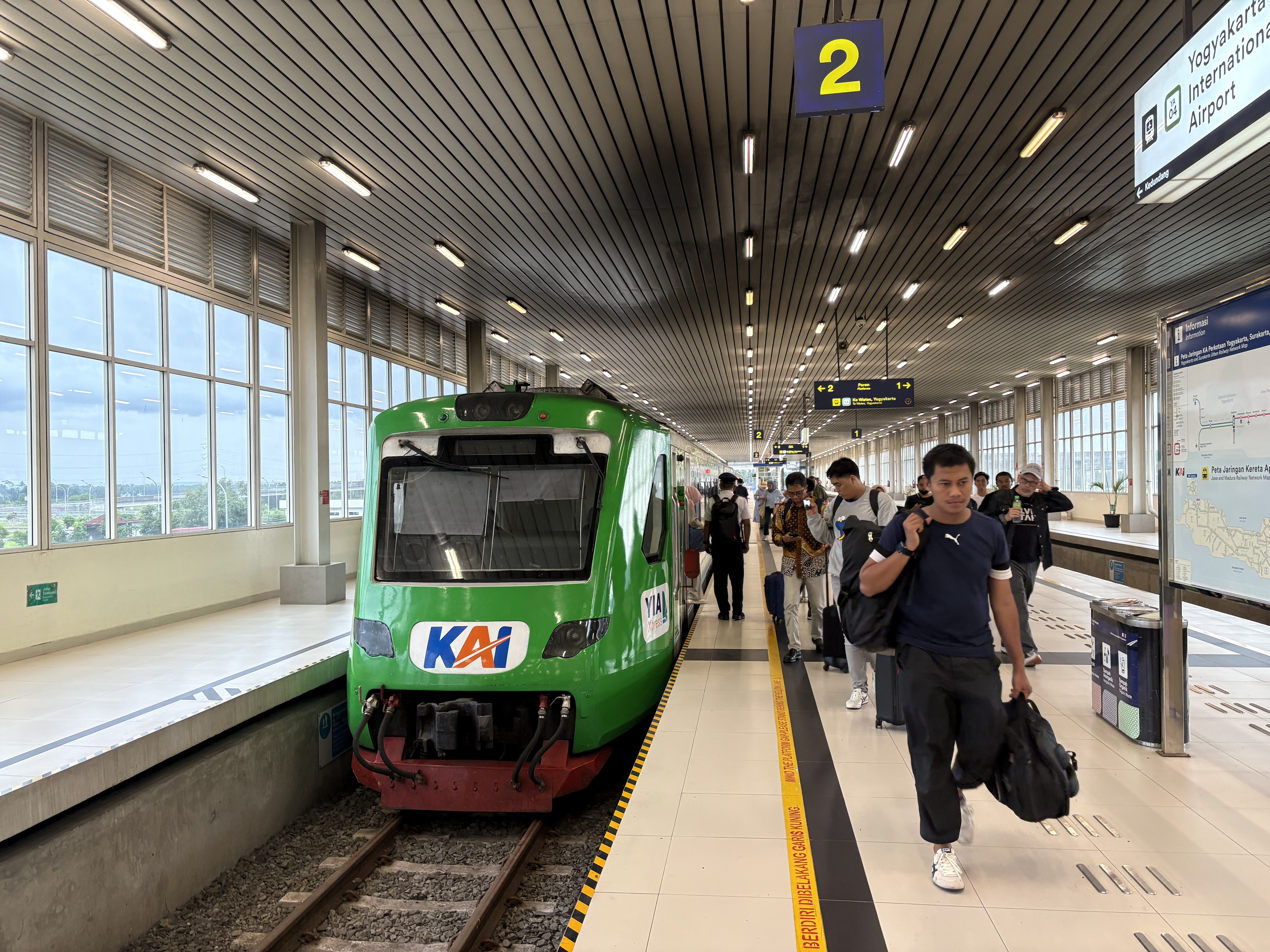
- Platform number 2 of the station with a YIA Rail Link train

General information
- Location: Yogyakarta International Airport complex, Glagah, Temon, Kulon Progo Regency, Special Region of Yogyakarta, Indonesia
- Coordinates: 7.89829°N 110.06167°E
- Elevation: +22 m
- System: Airport rail link station
- Owner: Kereta Api Indonesia
- Operator: KAI Bandara; Angkasa Pura
- Line: YIA Rail Link
- Platforms: 2 side platforms; 1 island platform
- Tracks: 2

Construction
- Accessible: Available

Other information
- Station code: YIA
- Classification: Class I

History
- Opened: 27 August 2021 (pre-official launch)

Services
Preceding station	Kereta Api Indonesia	Following station
Terminus	Yogyakarta Int'l Airport Rail Link	Wates towards Yogyakarta
Location

Yogyakarta International Airport Station (YIA) (Indonesian: Stasiun Yogyakarta International Airport/Stasiun Bandar Udara Internasional Yogyakarta) is a class I airport rail link station located at Yogyakarta International Airport in Glagah, Temon, Kulon Progo, Special Region of Yogyakarta, Indonesia. The station is located at an altitude of +22 m, and is currently the southernmost active station in the province. The station is located within the airport complex and only serves YIA Airport Rail link trips to and from Yogyakarta Station. When it is in operation, the station assists the role of Wojo Station as the closest station to YIA Airport.

KAI Bandara, a joint subsidiary of Kereta Api Indonesia (KAI) and Angkasa Pura II, took over the station's management from Operational Region VI Yogyakarta of the KAI since 1 April 2022, so that it becomes the first airport train station inside an Angkasa Pura I asset managed by the Angkasa Pura II subsidiary.

YIA station was opened simultaneously with the YIA Rail Link in a pre-official launch event on 27 August 2021, by the Coordinating Minister for Maritime Affairs and Investment Luhut Binsar Panjaitan, Minister of Transportation Budi Karya Sumadi, Deputy Minister of State-owned Enterprises Kartika Wirjoatmodjo, and the Governor of Special Region of Yogyakarta Hamengkubuwono X. The station and its airport train operation was started from 1 September 2021.

== Building and layout ==
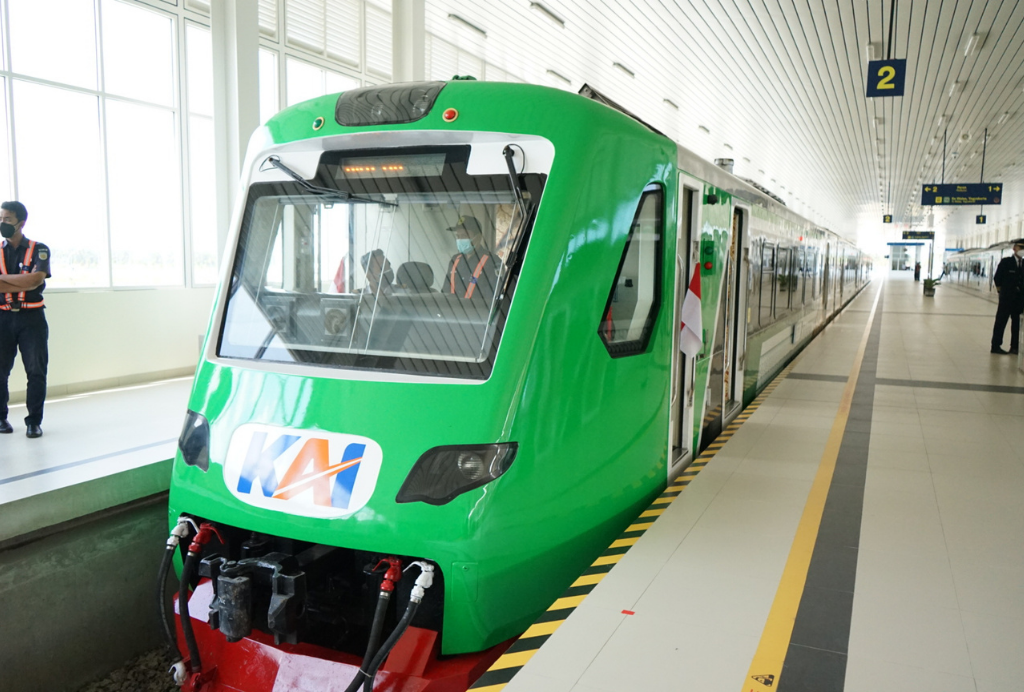
The YIA Airport Rail link train at the station platform

Yogyakarta International Airport Station only has two railway lines with both lines being straight tracks because the branch line to the airport was built on a double track from the start. The line construction has been prepared for the possibility of extending the KRL Yogyakarta Line service to this station (west terminus point). A total of IDR 1.1 trillion was disbursed for this project.

The station is 5.4 km from Kedundang Station and was built elevated. The foundation construction for the branch line and also the station uses slab on pile, supported by piles and tied with capping beams, without using fill soil, hardening, or concrete. This is because the land passed by the railroad is classified as watery (paddy fields).

The station building was built by Angkasa Pura I, has an area of 1,500 square metres (0.15 ha) and can accommodate up to 200 passengers. Futuristic in style, it uses a canopy made of steel and panel walls made of aluminum and glass. Its canopy is 300 m long and 20 m wide. The station's signaling system already uses electrical signaling produced by Len Industri which has been installed since mid-2021.

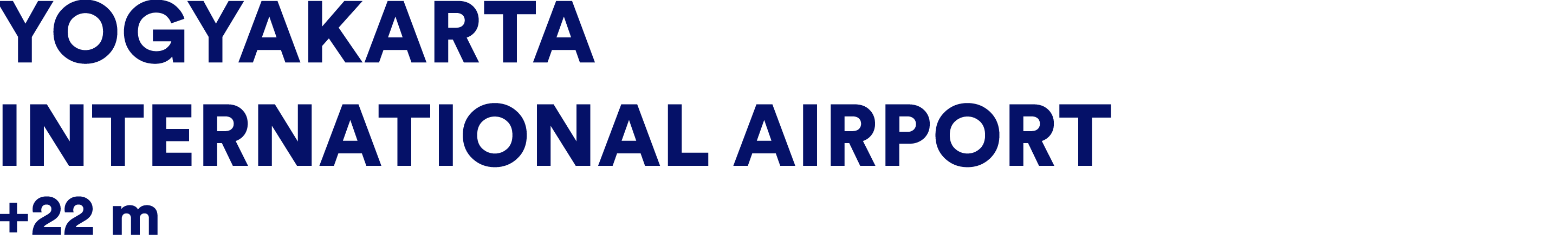
YA04

P

Entrance/exit gate

Side platform, the doors are opened on the right side
Line 2
YIA Airport Rail Link from and towards Yogyakarta (Wates) →
Island platform
Line 1
YIA Airport Rail Link from and towards Yogyakarta (Wates) →
Side platform, the doors are opened on the right side

== Services ==
- Yogyakarta International Airport Rail Link, to Yogyakarta

== Gallery ==
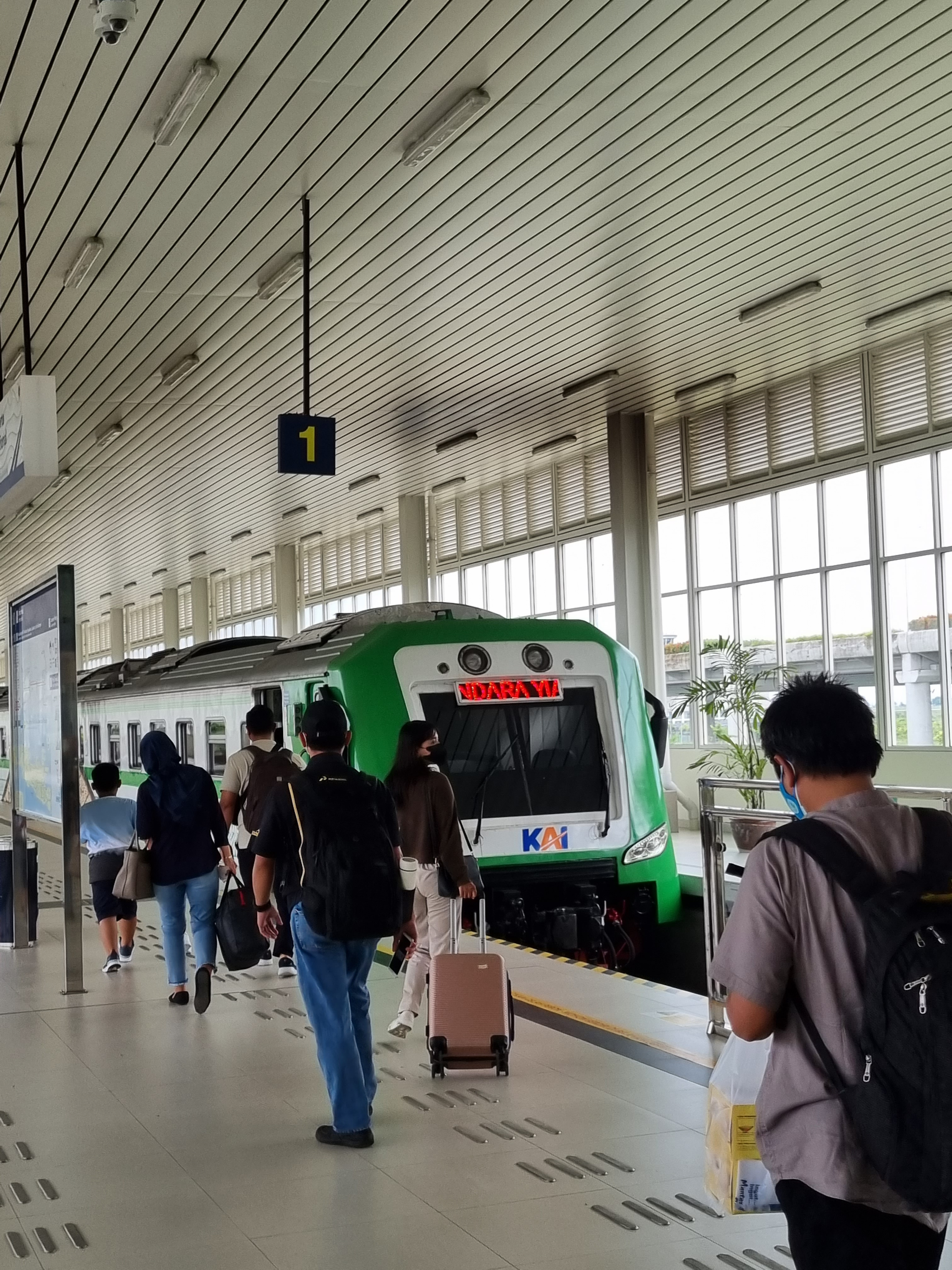
YIA Airport Rail Link waiting for departure on platform 1

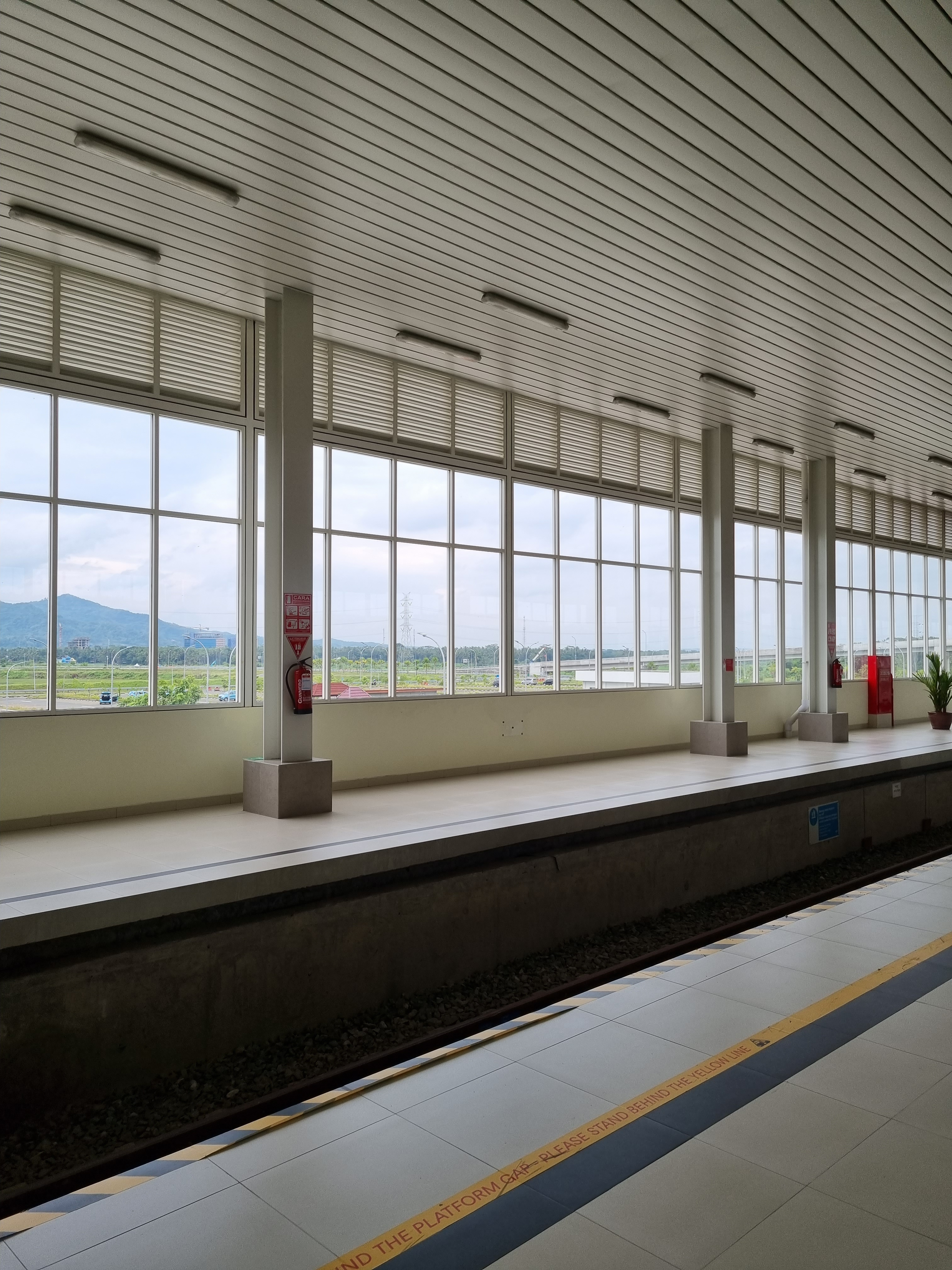
The station's view towards the Kuniran mountains

Preceding station	Kereta Api Indonesia	Following station
Kedundang	YIA branch line	Terminus
