= Yogyakarta metropolitan area =

Metropolitan area in Indonesia

Yogyakarta metropolitan area Kartamantul

Regional transcription(s)
  - Javanese: ꦏꦂꦠꦩꦤ꧀ꦠꦸꦭ꧀
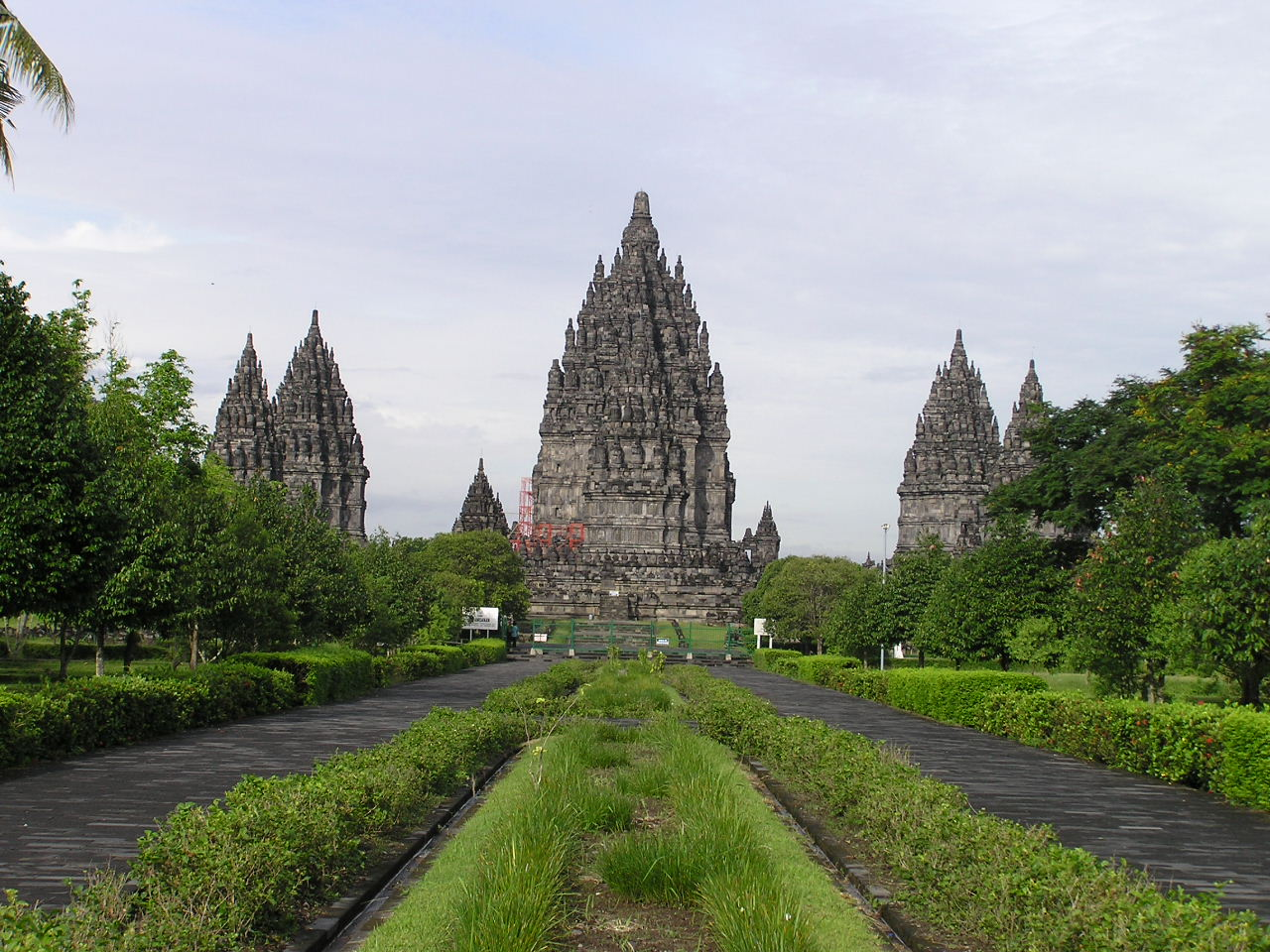
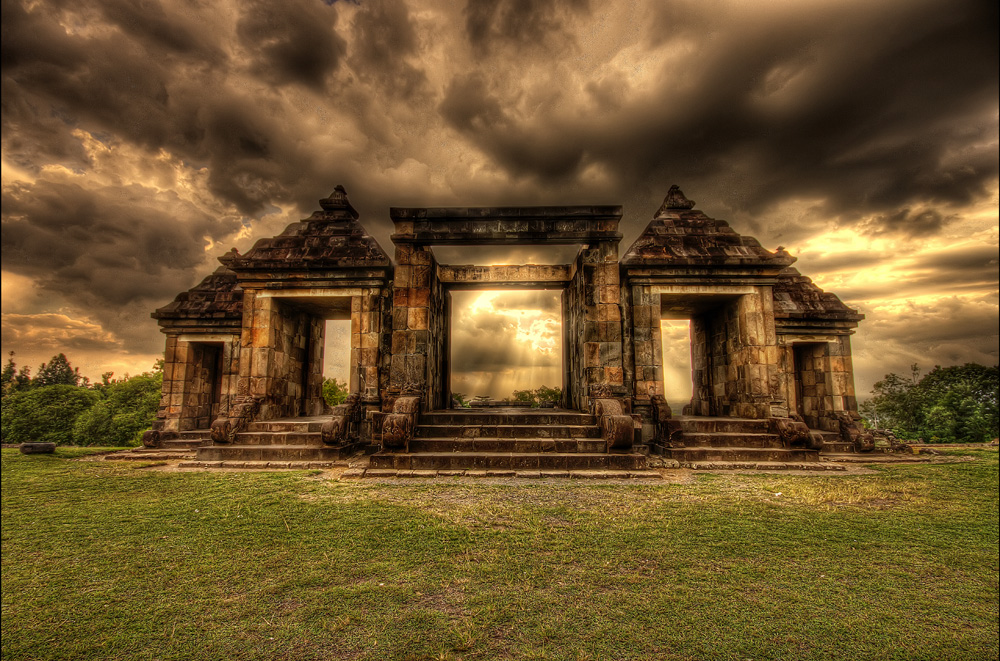
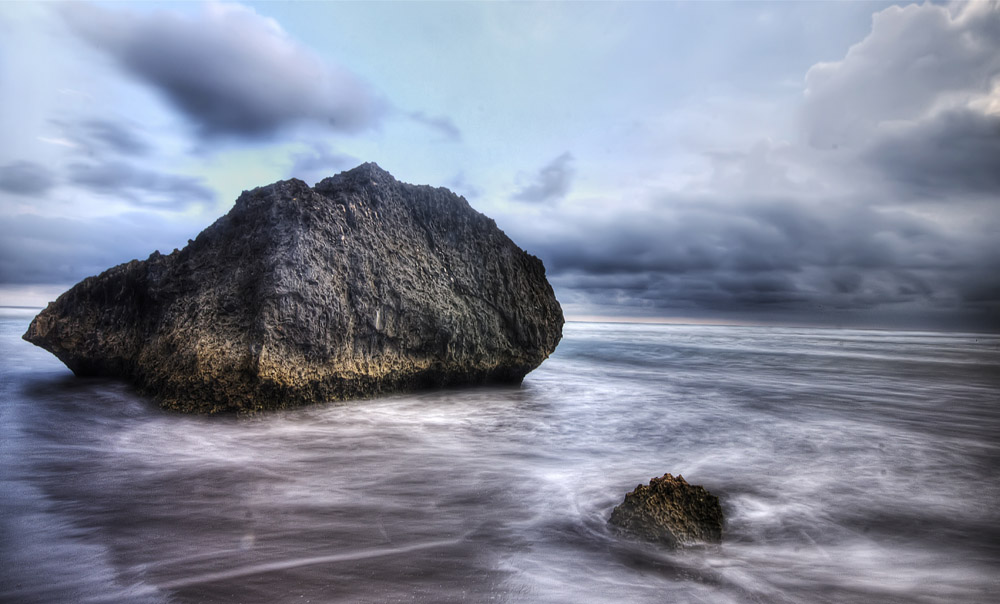
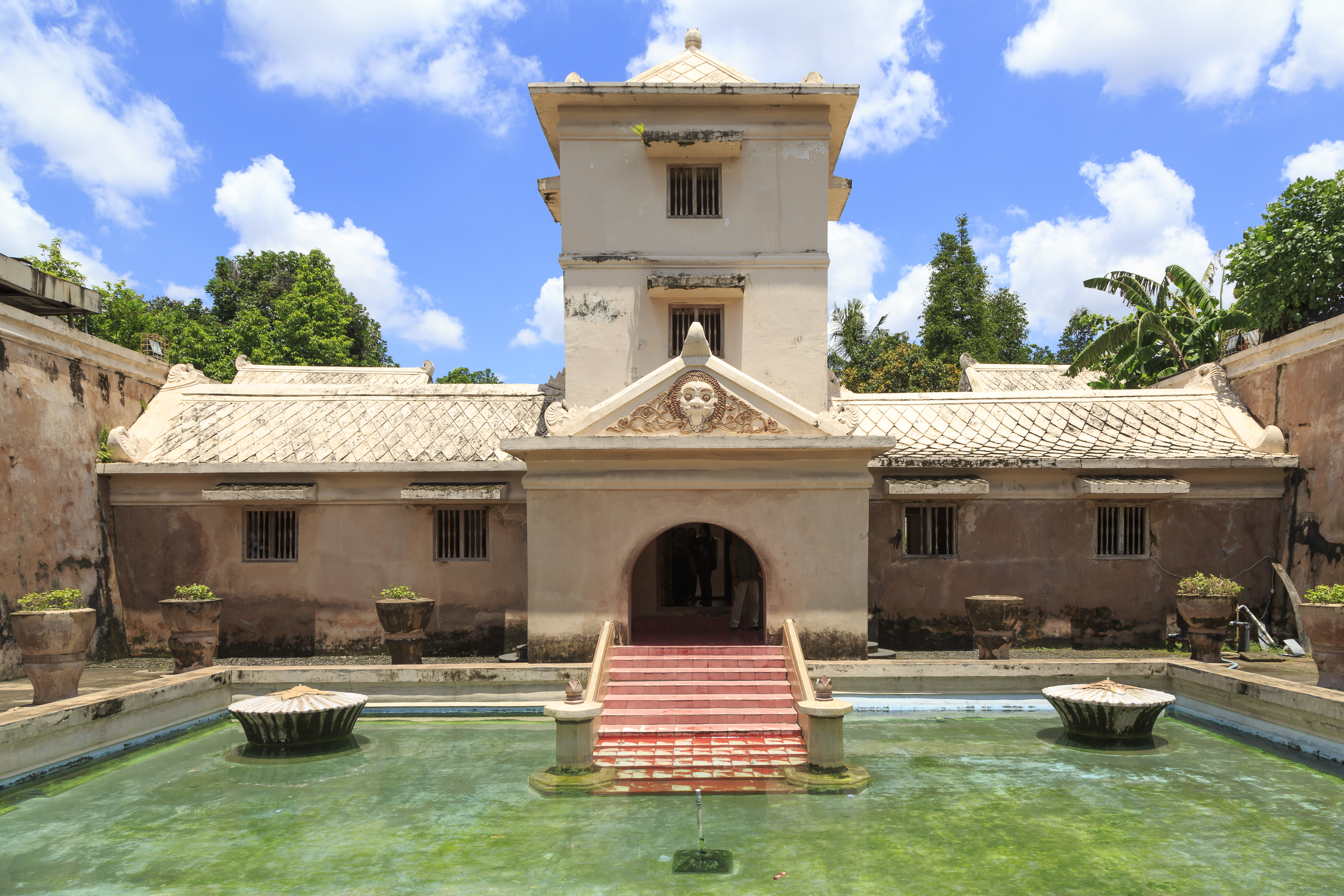
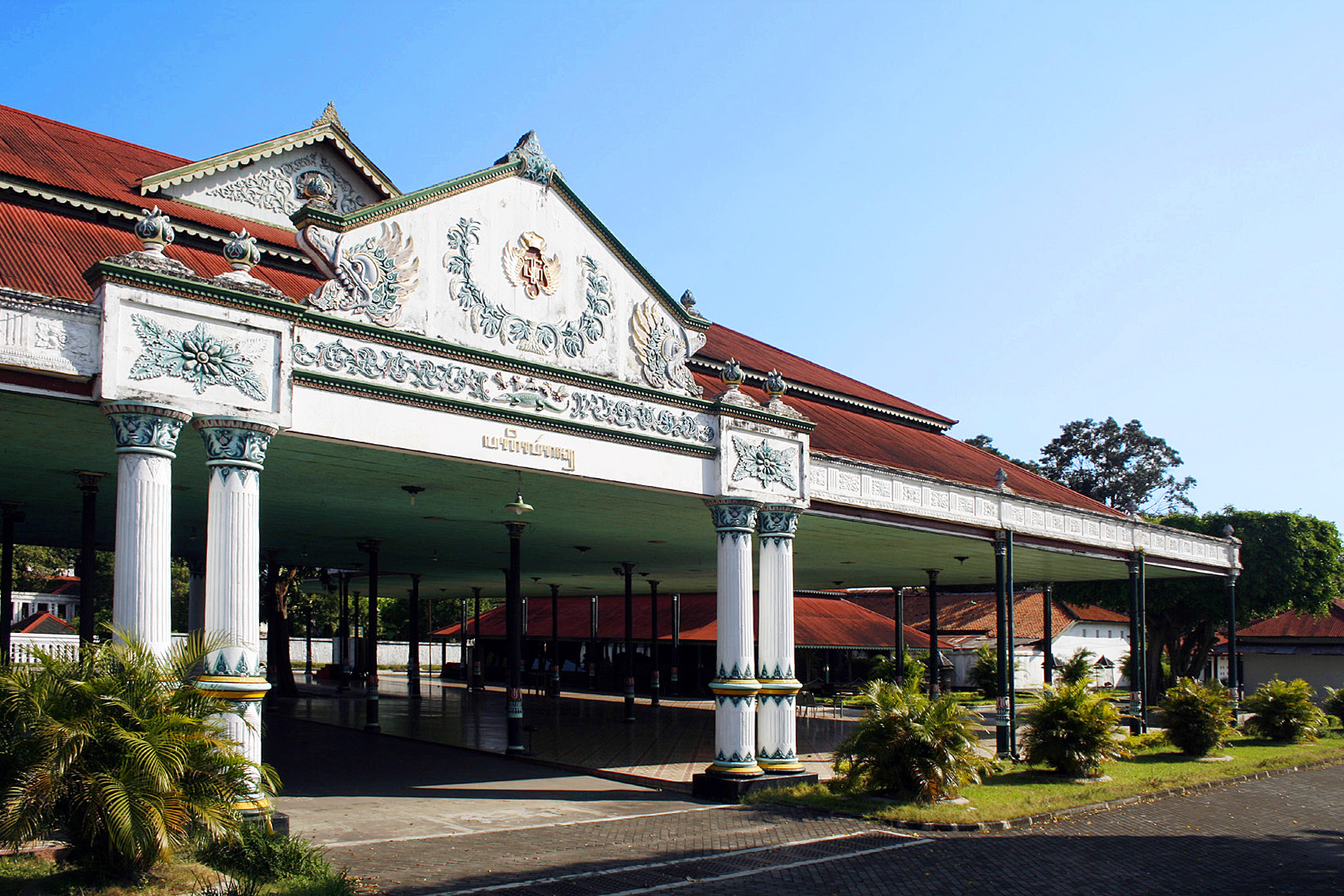
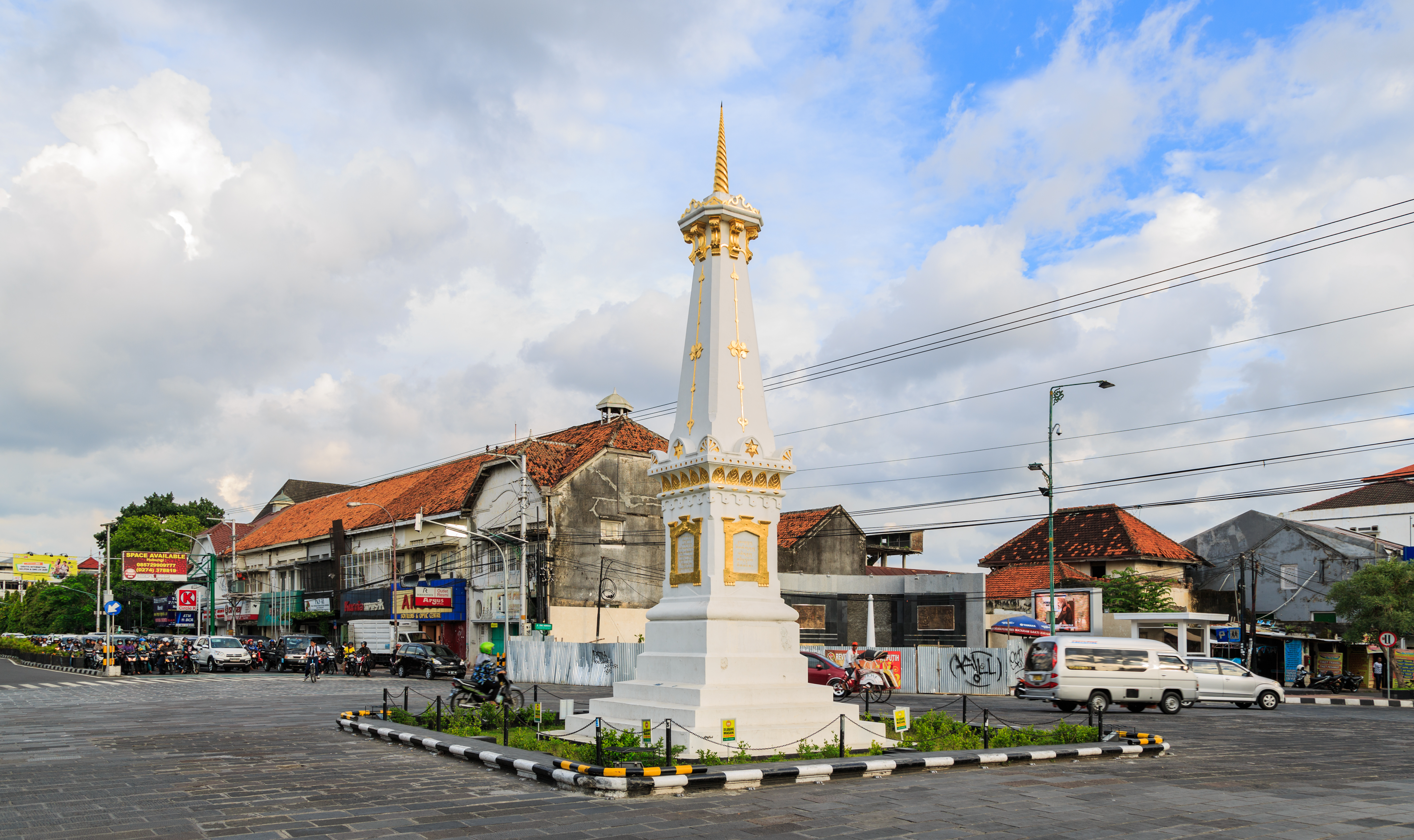
- Prambanan Temple Ratu Boko Sites Parangtritis Beach Taman Sari Water Castle Kraton Ngayogyakarta Hadiningrat Tugu Yogyakarta
- Country: Indonesia
- Province: Special Region of Yogyakarta
- Core city: Yogyakarta
- Regencies: Bantul Regency; Sleman Regency

Area
  - Metro: 1,115.45 km^{2} (430.68 sq mi)

Population (mid 2021 estimate)
  - Metro: 2,542,441
  - Metro density: 2,279.30/km^{2} (5,903.35/sq mi)
- Time zone: UTC+7 (Indonesia Western Time)
- GDP metro: 2023
- Total: ▲Rp 139.637 trillion ▲US$ 9.161 billion ▲US$ 29.340 billion (PPP)
- Per capita: ▲Rp 54.922 million ▲US$ 3,603 ▲US$ 11,540 (PPP)
- Website: kartamantul.jogjaprov.go.id

The Greater Yogyakarta, known locally as Kartamantul (Javanese: ꦏꦂꦠꦩꦤ꧀ꦠꦸꦭ꧀, romanized: Kartamantul), an acronym of Yogyakarta–Sleman–Bantul, is a built-up area in Special Region of Yogyakarta, Indonesia. Although unofficial, the Greater Yogyakarta sometimes referred to as the Yogyakarta metropolitan area.

== History ==
The city of Yogyakarta is the urban core of Yogyakarta Sultanate and later Special Region of Yogyakarta. However, in recent years, the urban population of the city has been extend across the border to regency around the city, those are Sleman Regency and Bantul Regency. Before 2001, the local government in future Kartamantul were involved in the collaboration on Integrated Urban Infrastructure Development Program (IUIDP) in between 1980s and 1990s with Special Region of Yogyakarta planning and implementation. In 2001, the government of Yogyakarta, Sleman, and Bantul established joint secretariate (Indonesian: Sekretariat Bersama) of Kartamantul. The joint secretariate agreement signed by all heads of the local governments with governor support.

== Geography ==
Similar to Special Region of Yogyakarta, Kartamantul is located near the southern coast of Java, surrounded by the province of Central Java, and with the Indian Ocean on the south side. The exception are Kulon Progo Regency, which located on west of Progo River and Kartamantul, and Gunung Kidul Regency which located on east of Kartamantul. Mount Merapi is located to the immediate north of the city of Yogyakarta and Sleman Regency, hence to immediate north of Kartamantul. It is the most active volcano in Indonesia and has erupted regularly since 1548.

== Economy ==
The economy of Kartamantul is dominated by agriculture, commonly in Sleman Regency and Bantul Regency. However, urban activities such as higher education, trade, tourism, art and handicraft industries are sharply increase with focus on the city of Yogyakarta. Kartamantul is the second largest tourist spot in Indonesia for local and international tourist. Kartamantul is known for educational institution hotspot in Indonesia.

== Transportation ==
Kartamantul is served by Adisutjipto International Airport and Yogyakarta International Airport, the latter being opened for minimum operations in late April 2019 and fully operational starting late March 2020. There are two main railway stations: Lempuyangan Station and Yogyakarta railway station.

Kartamantul is considered one of the major hubs that link the west–east main railway route in Java island. Yogyakarta Station is the main train station located in the center, and Lempuyangan Station is the second train station in the city. The two stations have their own schedule to and from other cities on Java island. The Prambanan Express commuter rail service operates west of Yogyakarta Station across Kulonprogo Regency to Purworejo, and KAI Commuter Yogyakarta Line electric commuter rail system operates from east of the station to Surakarta. To the south, in the Bantul region, is the Giwangan bus station, one of the largest bus station in Indonesia. The Yogyakarta metropolitan center is surrounded by a ring road.

Since 2008, the government of Special Region of Yogyakarta launched a bus rapid transit system, the Trans Jogja, which connects places in and around Kartamantul, including the airport and the Prambanan temple.

== Government and politics ==
Population density of Java and Madura by subdistrict as of 2022, with major urban areas shown

Kartamantul is administered by one city government (city of Yogyakarta), two regency governments (Sleman Regency and Bantul Regency) and one special region government.

Name	Capital	Area (km^{2})	Population 2000 Census	Population 2010 Census	Population 2020 Census	Population 2023 Estimate	HDI2023
Yogyakarta City	Yogyakarta City	32.50	396,700	388,627	373,589	375,702	0.886 (Very High)
Bantul Regency	Bantul	508.13	781,000	911,503	985,770	1,009,438	0.817 (Very High)
Sleman Regency	Sleman	574.82	901,400	1,093,110	1,125,804	1,157,300	0.849 (Very High)
Total		1,115.45	2,079,100	2,393,240	2,485,163	2,542,441	0.842 (Very High)

The joint secretariate is organized into three management layers. The first layer consist of political executives representation from the city and both regencies. The second layer consist of group senior administrative officers from the city and both regencies. The third layer consists of technical officers.

The joint secretariat intended on managing infrastructure at cross-regional borders, which are (1) road infrastructure, (2) waste management, (3) transportation, (4) clean (drinking) water, (5) drainage and sewerage, and (6) spatial planning.

== See also ==
- List of metropolitan areas in Indonesia
- Jakarta metropolitan area
- Surabaya metropolitan area
- Bandung metropolitan area
- Semarang metropolitan area
- Padang metropolitan area
