= Yogyakarta International Airport Rail Link =

Airport rail link in Yogyakarta, Indonesia

Yogyakarta International Airport Raillink Services (ARS)
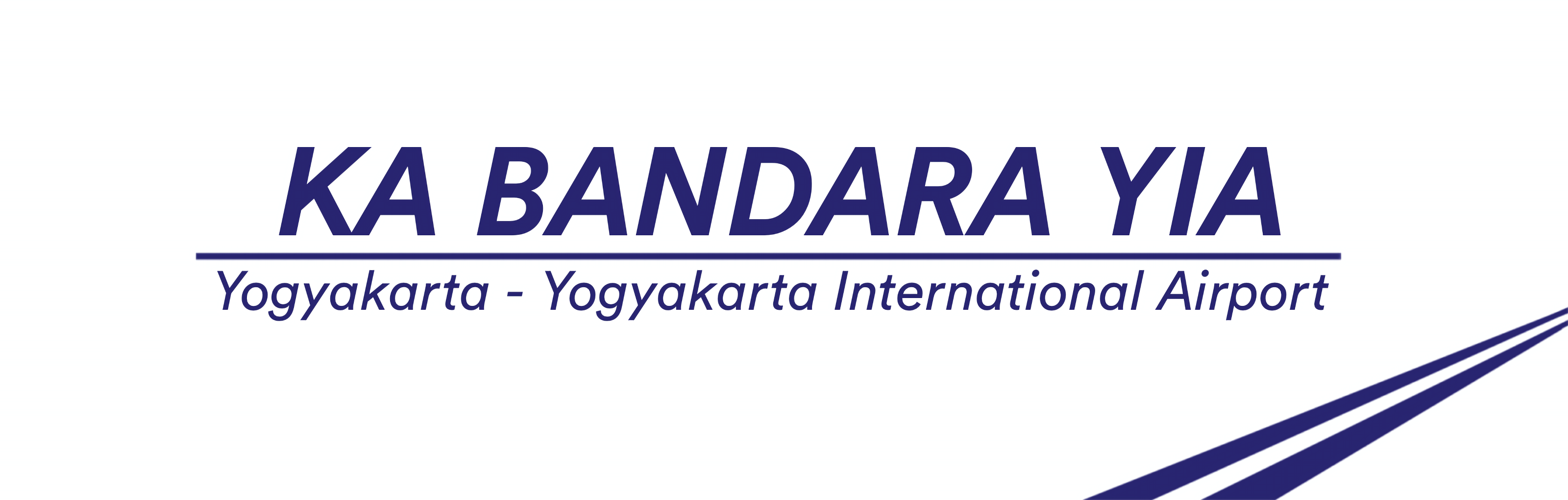

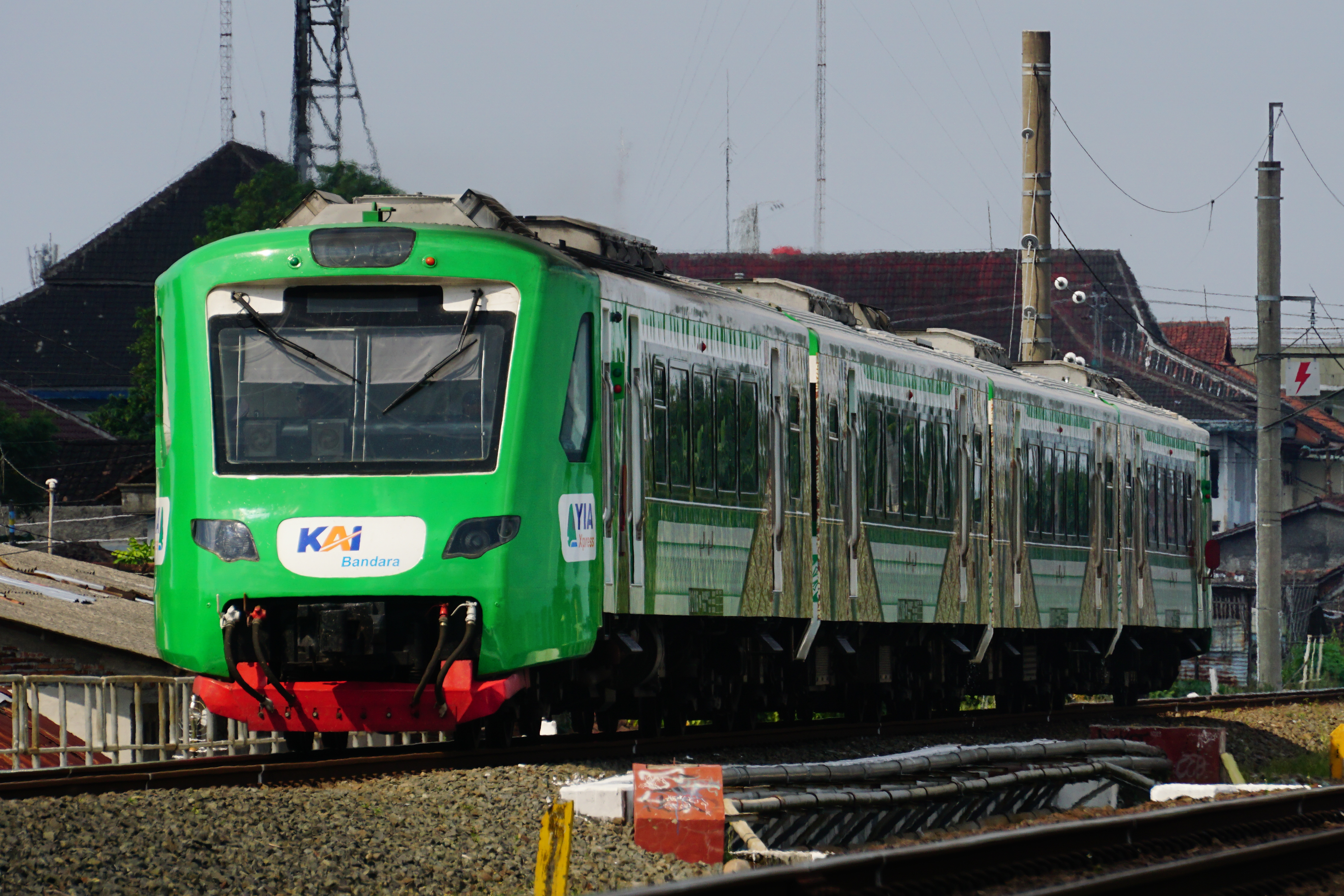
- Yogyakarta International Airport Rail Link train departing from Yogyakarta Station to Yogyakarta International Airport Station

Overview
- Native name: Kereta api Bandara Internasional Yogyakarta
- Status: In service
- Owner: KAI Bandara
- Locale: Special Region of Yogyakarta, Indonesia
- Termini: Yogyakarta; Yogyakarta International Airport

Service
- Type: Express rail
- System: Airport rail link
- Services: Yogyakarta–Wates–Yogyakarta International Airport
- Operator: KAI Commuter
- Rolling stock: INKA ME204 Series DEMU; 4-carriage trainsets
- Daily ridership: 7,700 (Average); 2.8 million (Annual, 2025)

History
- Opened: 17 September 2021

Technical
- Number of tracks: Double track
- Character: Ground & Elevated
- Track gauge: 1,067 mm (3 ft 6 in)
- Operating speed: 60–100 km/h (37–62 mph)

Yogyakarta International Airport Rail Link (Indonesian: Kereta api Bandara Internasional Yogyakarta) is an airport rail link service in Special Region of Yogyakarta and Central Java, Indonesia, operated by Kereta Api Indonesia. Launched on 6 May 2019, it had two routes, Yogyakarta–Wojo and Yogyakarta–Wojo–Kebumen, before it changed into the single Yogyakarta–Yogyakarta International Airport route in 2021 after a spur line to the airport was completed.

The service is one of the options to reach Yogyakarta International Airport, which replaced Adisutjipto International Airport as the main airport for Yogyakarta and surrounding areas. The train used to terminate at Wojo Station, because the direct rail connection to the airport had not been completed yet. Wojo Station was considered the closest active station to the airport as the closer Kedundang Station was inactive and under reconstruction. There were Perum DAMRI shuttle buses from Wojo Station to the airport, which was 4 km (2.5 mi) away.

The rail connection to the Yogyakarta International Airport was to be completed by 2021. It was completed on 17 September.

== Stations ==
All stations served by the train have exclusive comfortable waiting rooms for the airport passengers and international standard toilets.

Number	Station	Transfer/Notes	Location	
YA01; P01; JS05; Y01	Yogyakarta	Terminal station Intercity trains KRL Commuterline Yogyakarta–Solo Prambanan Ekspres Trans Jogja: Line 1A, Line 2A, Teman Bus Godean Line (Mangkubumi 2); Line 1A, Line 2A, Line 3A, Line 8, Line 10 (Malioboro 1)	Yogyakarta	Special Region of Yogyakarta
YA02; P05; JS06	Wates	Intercity trains Prambanan Ekspres	Kulon Progo Regency	Special Region of Yogyakarta
YA03; P06	Kedundang	Pass-through station	Kulon Progo Regency	Special Region of Yogyakarta
YA04	Yogyakarta International Airport	Terminal station Yogyakarta International Airport	Kulon Progo Regency	Special Region of Yogyakarta

== See also ==
- Rail transport in Indonesia
- Yogyakarta metropolitan area
