= Bengawan =

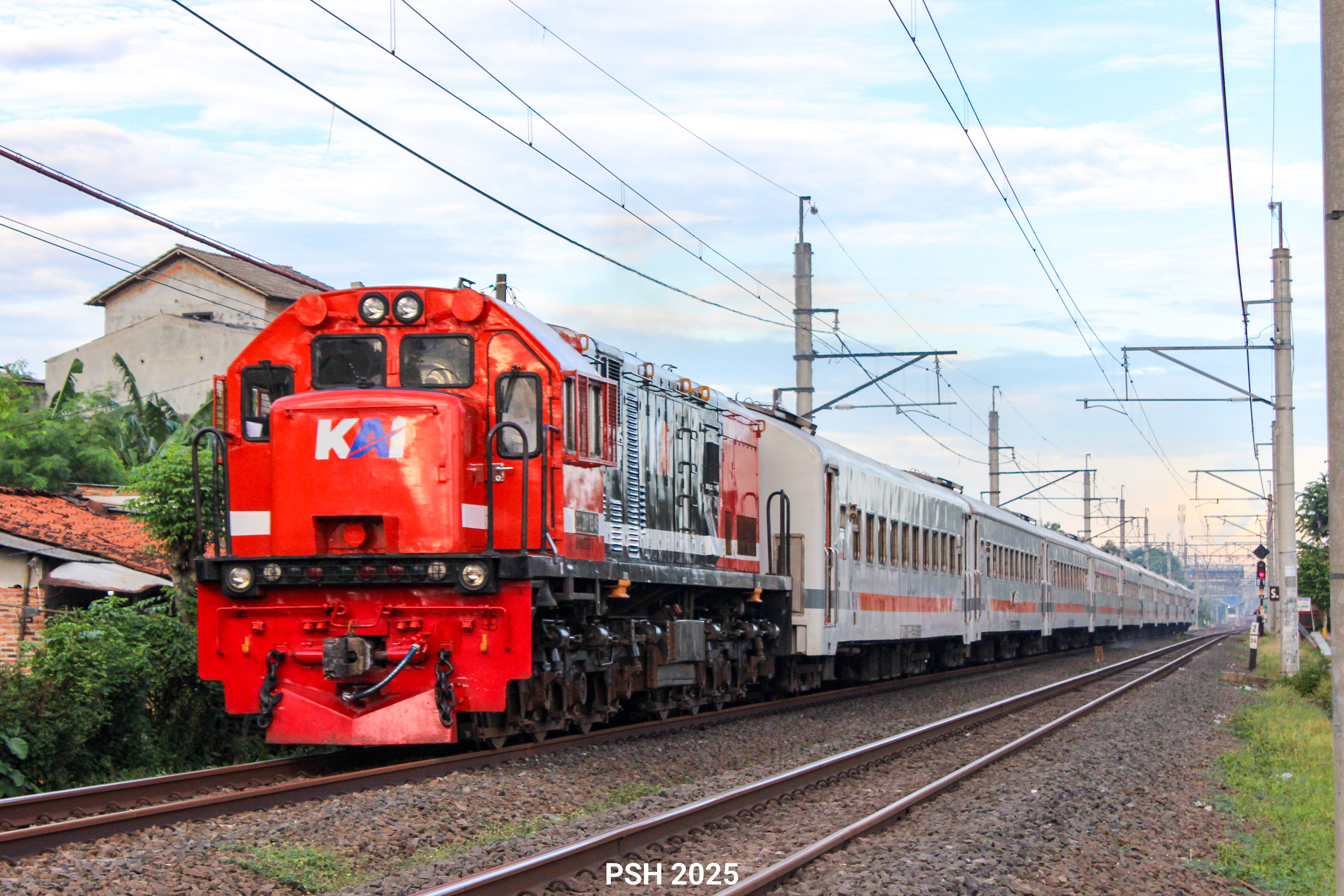

Overview
- Service type: Inter-city rail
- Status: Operating
- Locale: Central Java and Jakarta, Indonesia
- First service: 1994; 31 years ago
- Current operator(s): KAI Operational Area VI Yogyakarta

Route
- Termini: Purwosari; Pasar Senen
- Distance travelled: 567 km (352 mi)
- Service frequency: Daily each way
- Train number(s): 245-246

On-board services
- Class(es): Economy class
- Seating arrangements: 3-2
- Catering facilities: On-board café
- Baggage facilities: Overhead racks.
- Other facilities: Light fire extinguisher, emergency brake, air conditioner, and toilet.

Technical
- Track gauge: 1,067 mm (3 ft 6 in)
- Operating speed: 70–90 km/h

Bengawan is an economy class train that serves the Purwosari-Pasar Senen route via the central and southern railway lines of Java Island.

The name of this train comes from the longest river that crosses several areas on Java Island, namely Bengawan.

== Operation ==
This train first operated on the Solo Jebres-Tanah Abang route via Pasar Senen before changing its terminus station to Tanjung Priok in 2013. A year later, there were two route cuts, namely from Solo Jebres to Purwosari on 1 February 2014 and Pasar Senen from Tanjung Priok nine months later.

In the last three years, the train has added stops at Cikarang since March 2022, Pegaden Baru since June 2023, and Kebasen since December 2024.

== Route ==
Station name	Distance from (km)		Location	
Station name	Previous station	Purwosari	Regency/Cities	Province
Purwosari^{1}	—		Surakarta	Central Java
Klaten	27.743		Klaten	Central Java
Lempuyangan	27.281	55.024	Yogyakarta	Special Region of Yogyakarta
Wates	29.283	84.307	Kulon Progo	Special Region of Yogyakarta
Kutoarjo	35.643	119.950	Purworejo	Central Java
Kebumen	28.113	148.063	Kebumen	Central Java
Gombong	19.467	167.530	Kebumen	Central Java
Kroya	28.489	196.019	Cilacap	Central Java
Kebasen	12.808	208.827	Banyumas	Central Java
Purwokerto	14.369	223.196	Banyumas	Central Java
Bumiayu^{3}	37.385	260.581	Brebes	Central Java
Prupuk^{2}	18.623	279.204	Tegal	Central Java
Cirebon Prujakan	73.169	352.373	Cirebon	West Java
Pegaden Baru	96.504	448.877	Subang	West Java
Cikarang	80.975	529.852	Bekasi Regency	West Java
Bekasi	16.737	546.589	Bekasi	West Java
Jatinegara^{3}	14.802	561.391	East Jakarta	Jakarta
Pasar Senen^{1}	5.605	566.996	Central Jakarta	Jakarta

Notes:

^1 Termini.
^2 Stop only on the route to Purwosari.
^3 Stop only on the route to Pasar Senen.
