= Prambanan Express Commuter Line =

Indonesian commuter rail service

Prambanan Express
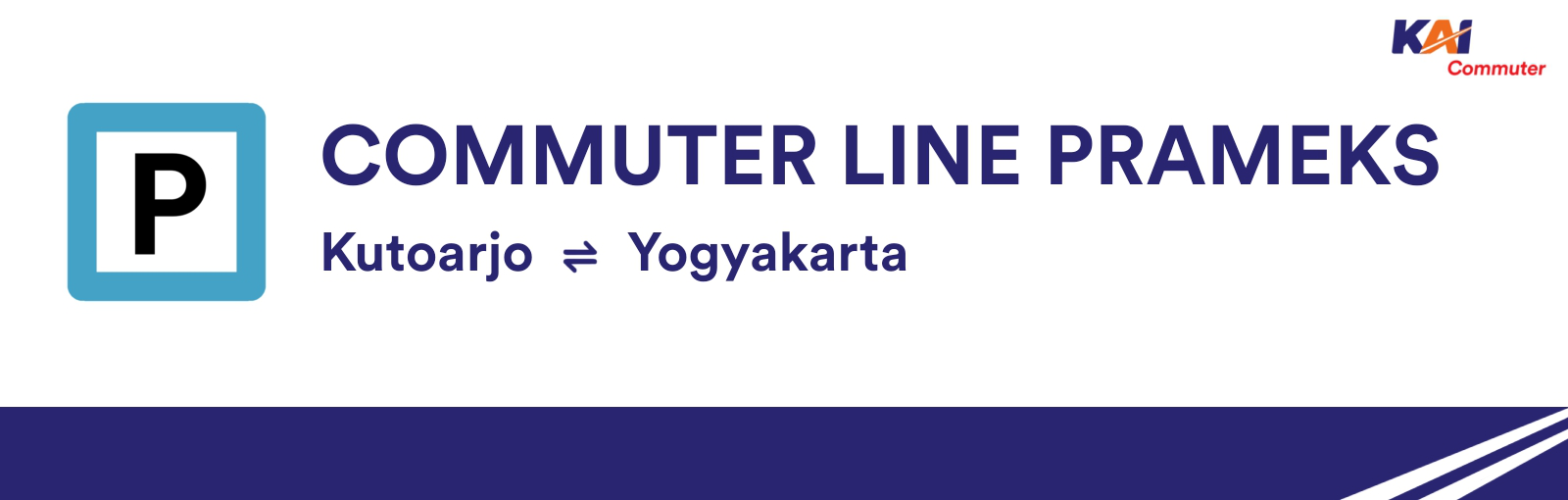

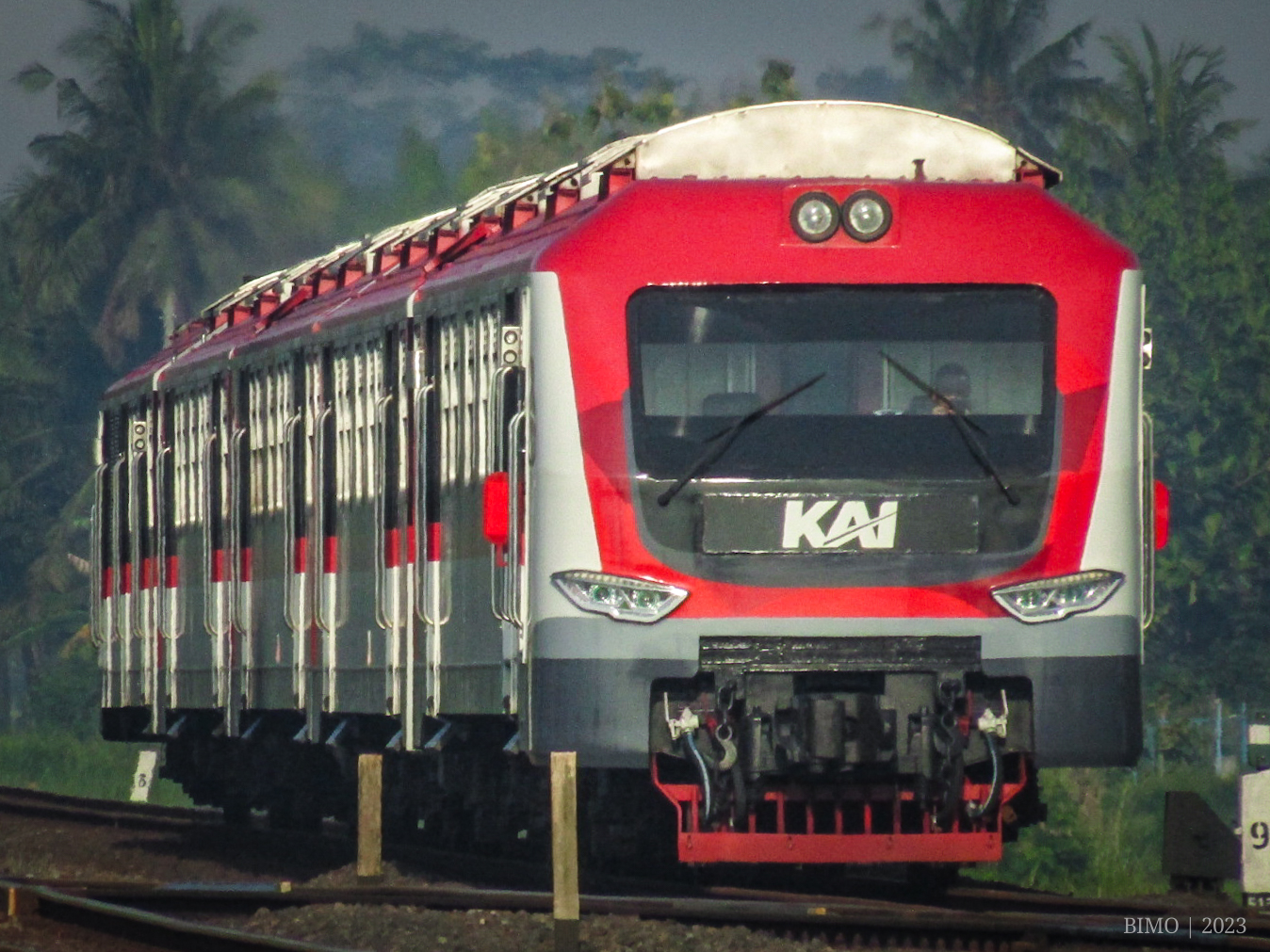
- Prambanan Express train departing from Wates Station

Overview
- Service type: Commuter rail
- Status: Operating
- Locale: 6th Operational Area of Yogyakarta
- Predecessor: Kuda Putih (1963-1980)
- First service: 20 May 1994; 32 years ago
- Successor: KAI Commuter Yogyakarta Line (Yogyakarta–Solo Balapan segment)
- Current operator: KAI Commuter
- Ridership: 1,200,000 (annual, 2024)

Route
- Termini: Yogyakarta; Kutoarjo
- Stops: 5
- Distance travelled: 64 kilometres (40 mi)
- Service frequency: 10 - 12
- Train number: 249-269

Technical
- Rolling stock: ME201 (Ex BN-Holec); MH102 (KRDI) and ME204 (shared rollingstock with YIA airport rail service) carrying Locomotive (only emergency)
- Track gauge: 1,067 mm
- Operating speed: 60 - 100 km/hours

Prambanan Express Commuter Line (Indonesian: Commuter Line Prambanan Ekspres) or simply Prambanan Express, commonly abbreviated as Pramex (in English) and Prameks (in Indonesian), is a commuter rail service that operates between Yogyakarta, Special Region of Yogyakarta and Kutoarjo, Purworejo Regency, Central Java in Indonesia. The service, which first operated in 1994, covers a distance of about 64 kilometers (40 mi) and operates using diesel multiple unit trains. It was previously serving Yogyakarta–Solo for 26 years before it was electrified in 2021.

The train was once operated by 6th Operational Area of Yogyakarta of the national railway company, Kereta Api Indonesia (KAI). As part of transition to electrified commuter railway service, KAI's subsidiary KAI Commuter took over the operations of Prameks on 5 October 2020.

== History ==
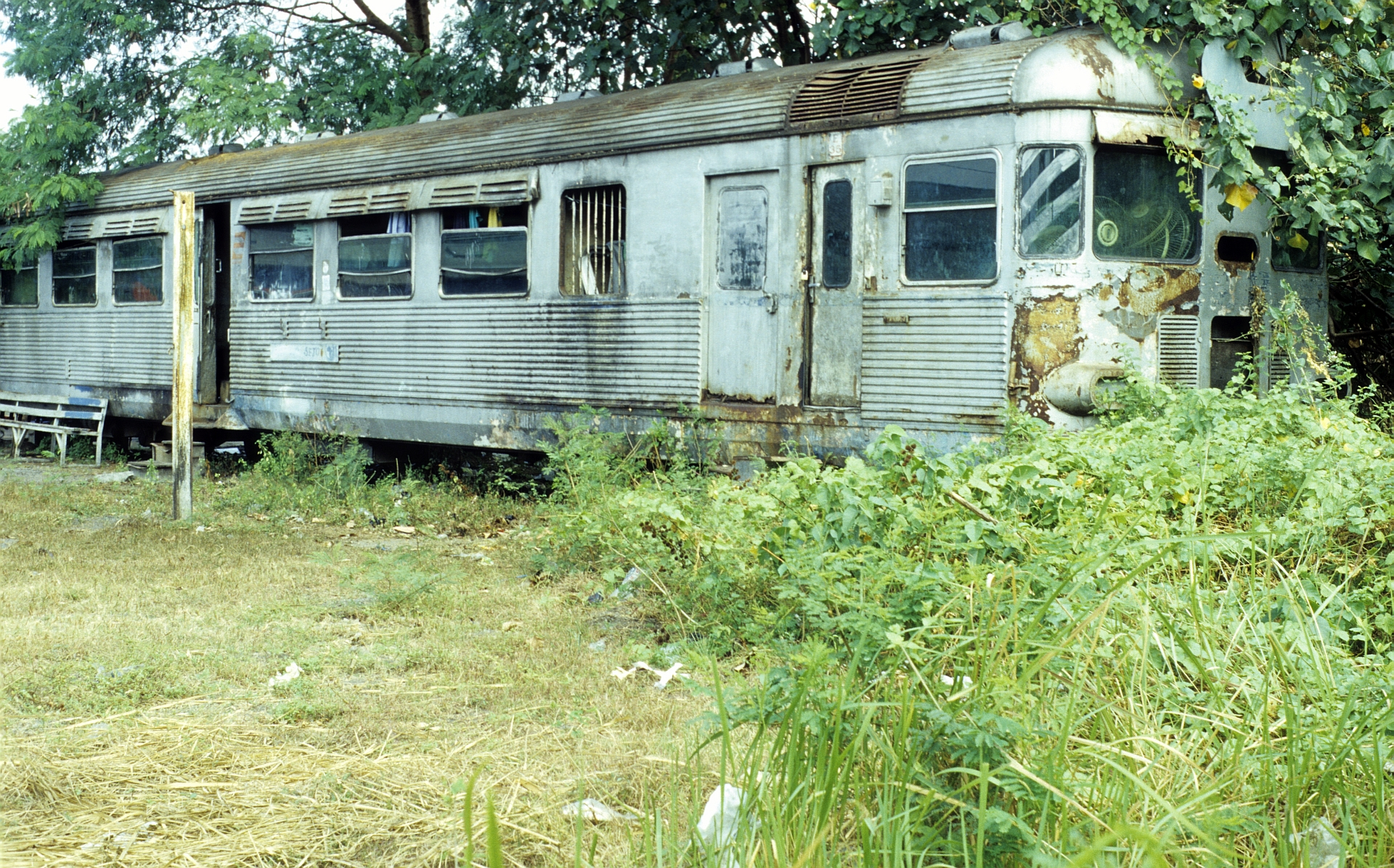
Kuda Putih, one of the ancestors of DMU-based commuter rail services in Indonesia.

The predecessor of Prameks was known as Kuda Putih (the White Horse train in English), as there were two horses used as decoration above of the driver's window. The train had been operating from 1963 to 1980. It was one of the first diesel multiple unit (DMU) ever operated in Indonesia. Because of a lack of spare parts, the service was terminated in 1980s.

Due to the increasing demand from commuters, the rail service was relaunched as Prameks train on 20 May 1994, connects Solo and Yogyakarta. The train consists of four business class passenger cars hauled by a diesel locomotive. In response to intense enthusiasm for the service, executive class cars were added. The train was replaced by diesel multiple units manufactured by Nippon Sharyo, Japan. In 2006, the diesel-electric multiple units (DMUs) made by PT Inka Madiun was introduced to support Prameks. Citing the higher enthusiasm of passengers using this train, in 2007 Prameks began opening the Yogyakarta-Kutoarjo-Solo (and vice versa) route. The route is served by three sets of diesel-electric multiple units (DMUs) and five sets of diesel multiple units (DMUs).

While Prambanan Express still serving Yogyakarta, Kutoarjo, and Solo, the train is a mainstay of public transport for the community in these three cities. It was popular among daily commuters as well as tourists who visit this area known as center for Javanese culture and heritage. It was served over 20 trips from Solo to Yogyakarta (and vice versa) at total.

Starting October 2020, the operations of Prambanan Express, previously managed by KAI, were transferred to KAI Commuter after obtaining the operation permit from Ministry of Transportation on 3 June 2020. As the Surakarta–Yogyakarta railway line is electrified, Prambanan Express operations is replaced by the KRL Commuterline Yogyakarta–Solo starting from 10 February 2021. As a consequence, Prameks route is shortened from previously Solo Balapan-Kutoarjo into Yogyakarta-Kutoarjo vice-versa.

== Route and fare ==
The train serves stations from Yogyakarta to Kutoarjo, stopping at stations like Wates, Wojo, and Jenar. As of 2025, the fare was Rp8,000 for a single trip per person

The train has 5 services per day from both stations, leading to a total of 10 services per day. An additional 6th service also runs but not everyday.

The trip takes about 1 hour and 7-10 minutes. From Yogyakarta the earliest train (KA501) departs at 06:40, while the last train (KA507) leaves at 18:05. From Kutoarjo the earliest train (KA508) departs at 05:10, while the last train (KA 510) departs at 18:45.

== Stations ==
Station Number	Station	Distance (km)		Transfers/Notes	Location	
Station Number	Station	From previous station	From Yogyakarta Termini	Transfers/Notes	Location	
P01; YA01; JS05; Y01	Yogyakarta	-	0.0	Terminal station Intercity trains KRL Commuterline Yogyakarta–Solo Yogyakarta International Airport Rail Link Trans Jogja: Line 1A, Line 2A, Teman Bus Godean Line (Mangkubumi 2); Line 1A, Line 2A, Line 3A, Line 8, Line 10 (Malioboro 1)	Yogyakarta	Special Region of Yogyakarta
P02	Patukan			Pass-through station	Sleman Regency	Special Region of Yogyakarta
P03	Rewulu			Pass-through station	Bantul Regency	Special Region of Yogyakarta
	Sedayu			Ghost station	Bantul Regency	Special Region of Yogyakarta
P04	Sentolo			Pass-through station	Kulon Progo Regency	Special Region of Yogyakarta
	Kalimenur			Ghost station	Kulon Progo Regency	Special Region of Yogyakarta
P05; YA02; JS06	Wates			Intercity trains Yogyakarta International Airport Rail Link	Kulon Progo Regency	Special Region of Yogyakarta
P06; YA03	Kedundang			Pass-through station, under reconstruction Yogyakarta International Airport Rail Link (planned)	Kulon Progo Regency	Special Region of Yogyakarta
P07	Wojo			Perum DAMRI shuttle bus to Yogyakarta International Airport	Purworejo Regency	Central Java
P08	Jenar				Purworejo Regency	Central Java
	Montelan			Ghost station	Purworejo Regency	Central Java
P09; JS07	Kutoarjo			Terminal station Intercity trains	Purworejo Regency	Central Java

== Rolling stock ==
=== Current ===
Class	Internal name	Image	Cars per set	Builder	Remark
KRDE Prameks	ME201		5	(Indonesia) INKA (2005-2007)	Rebuilt from BN/HOLEC Electric Multiple Unit; Shared rollingstock with Adisoemarmo & Yogyakarta Airport Rail Link one lost in an accident in 2012 and another was retired in 2014
KRDE Sriwedari	ME201		5	(Indonesia) INKA (2011)	Rebuilt from BN/HOLEC Electric Multiple Unit (inherited from Sriwedari commuter train) Some sets slated for transfer to Bandung HSR Feeder train
KRDE ME204	ME204		4	(Indonesia) INKA (2018)	Shared rollingstock with Adisoemarmo & Yogyakarta Airport Rail Link
KRDI	MH102		4	(Indonesia) INKA (2008-2014)	Shared rollingstock with Adisoemarmo & Yogyakarta Airport Rail Link, formerly shared with Madiun Jaya

=== Former ===
Class	Internal name	Image	Cars per set	Builder	Remark
MCDW 300	N/A		2	(Germany) Glossing und Scholer GmbH, Ferostaal	Operated as Kuda Putih one preserved at Lempuyangan station
MCW 302	MH101		Various	(Japan) Nippon Sharyo	
MCW 302	MH101		Various	(Japan) Nippon Sharyo	special class: K2 3 xxx Repower version, K1 3 xxx Kedungsepur

== Incidents ==
- On 23 October 2012, a ME 201 trainset K3 2 07 01F serving the line as KA 213 on Solo Jebres-Kutoarjo sector derailed at Brambanan station, injuring 40 passengers. The trainset was declared a total loss.

== See also ==
- Kereta Api Indonesia
- KRL Commuterline
- Rail transport in Indonesia
- List of named passenger trains of Indonesia
