= Wates railway station =

Railway station in Indonesia

P05 YA02 JS06 Wates Station Stasiun Wates
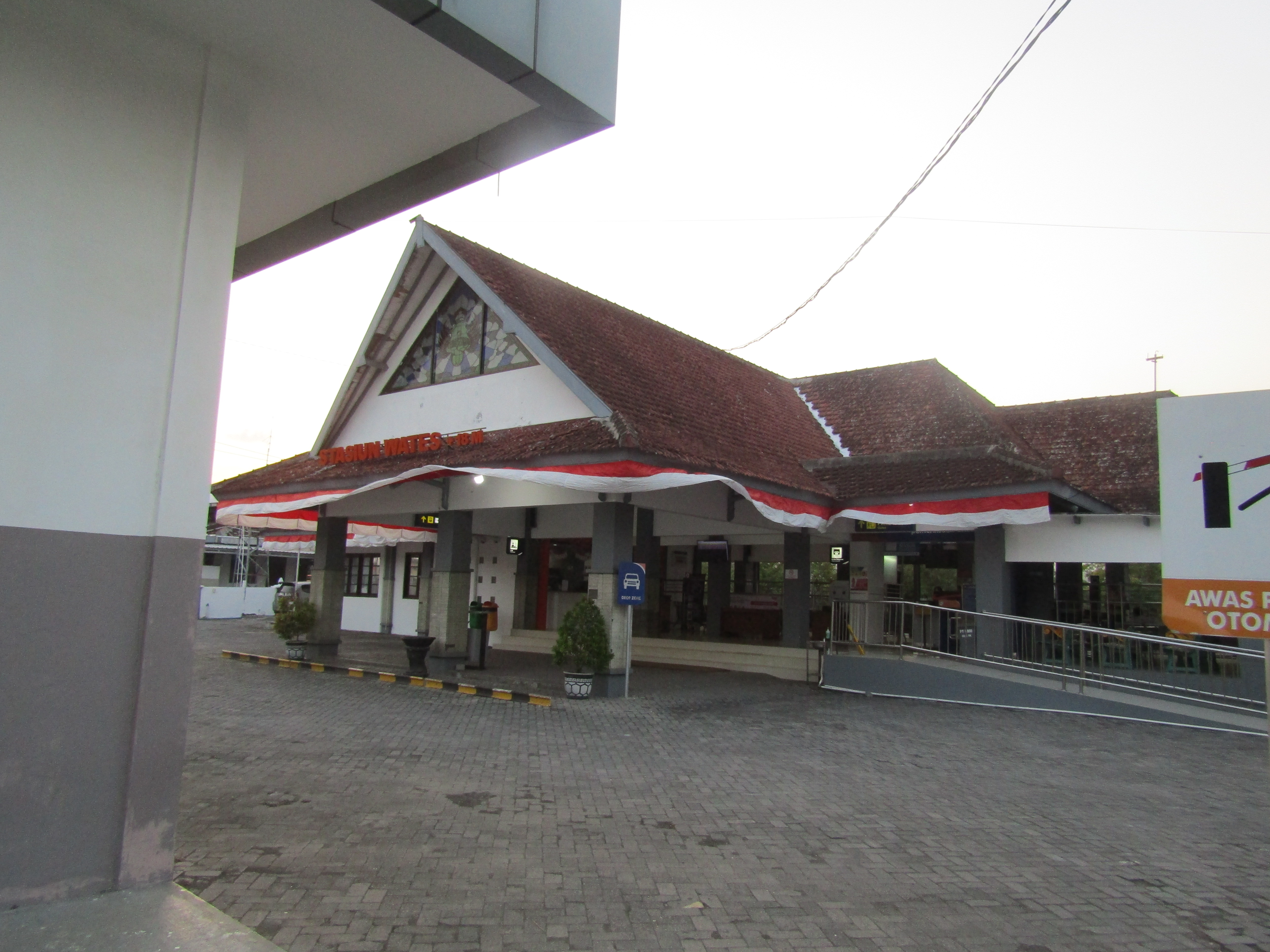
- Wates Station in 2021

General information
- Location: Jalan Stasiun Wates, Wates, Kulon Progo; Special Region of Yogyakarta; Indonesia
- Coordinates: 7.859444°S 110.1578933°E
- Elevation: +18 m (59 ft)
- Owner: Kereta Api Indonesia
- Operator: Kereta Api Indonesia; KAI Commuter
- Lines: Prambanan Express; YIA Airport Rail Link; Joglosemarkerto; Kutoarjo–Purwosari
- Platforms: 3
- Tracks: 5

Construction
- Structure type: Ground
- Parking: Available
- Accessible: Available

Other information
- Station code: WT • 3008
- Classification: Class II

Services
Preceding station	Kereta Api Indonesia	Following station
Kalimenur towards Purwosari	Kutoarjo–Purwosari	Kedundang towards Kutoarjo
Yogyakarta International Airport Terminus	Yogyakarta Int'l Airport Rail Link	Yogyakarta Terminus
Preceding station		Following station
Yogyakarta Terminus	Prambanan Express	Wojo towards Kutoarjo
Location
- Location within Java

Wates Station (WT) is a class-II railway station located in Wates, Kulon Progo Regency, Special Region of Yogyakarta, Indonesia owned by the Operational Area VI Yogyakarta of Kereta Api Indonesia. The station is located at an altitude of +18 meters, at the south of Alun-Alun Wates and Kulon Progo Regency government complex. It is the main station of the regency, serving various passenger rail services both long distance and local/commuter rail services.

== Building and layout ==
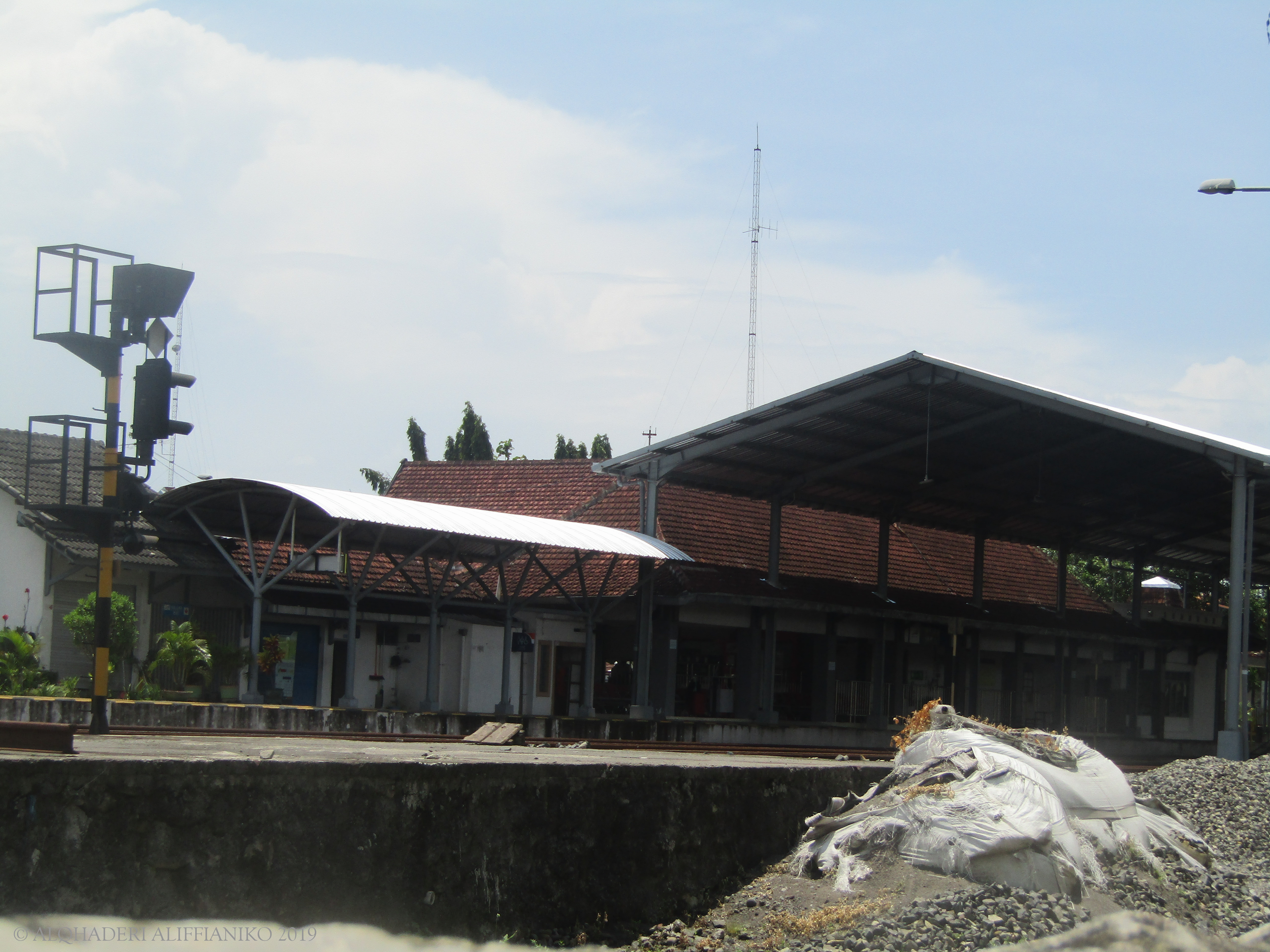
Wates station yard after the canopy was installed, 2019

Initially, Wates Station had four railway tracks with line 1 being a straight track. Since double-track line between Yogyakarta and Kutoarjo began operation in 2006–2007, track 1 is used as a straight track towards Yogyakarta, track 2 is used as a straight track towards Kutoarjo, tracks 3 and 4 is used for train stops, and track 5 as a new track which is often used only for parking or loading and unloading of ballast stone transport. The station layout thus was also changed.

The station has now been fitted with a canopy in its platform to protect passengers. Canopy installation was also carried out at Jenar Station.

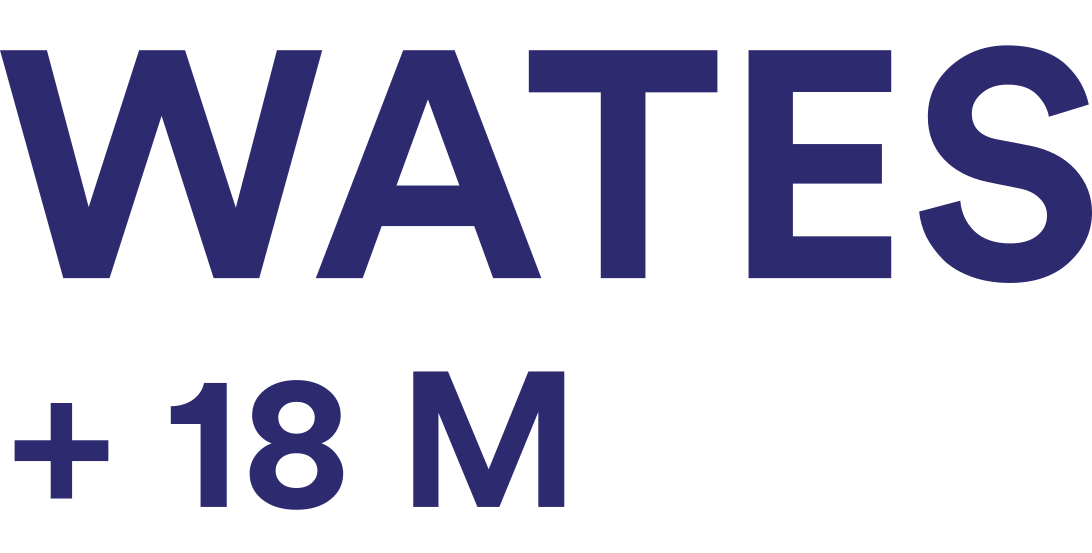
P05 YA02
P
Platform floor
Ballast unloading and loading area
Line 4
Train stop
Island platform
Line 3
← (Wojo) Prambanan Express to Kutoarjo
← (YIA) YIA Airport Rail Link to YIA
Inter-city train stop to Kutoarjo
Island platform
Line 2
Straight tracks for trains goes directly towards Kutoarjo
Line 1
Straight tracks for trains goes directly towards Yogyakarta
Inter-city train stop to Yogyakarta
Prambanan Express to Yogyakarta (Yogyakarta) →

YIA Airport Rail Link to Yogyakarta (Yogyakarta) →

Side platform
G
Main building

== Services ==
The following is a list of train services at Wates Station as of 2022.

=== Intercity trains ===
Executive and economy class

- Singasari, to Pasar Senen and Blitar
- Gaya Baru Malam Selatan, to Pasar Senen and Surabaya Gubeng
- Bogowonto, to Pasar Senen and Lempuyangan
- Gajahwong, to Pasar Senen and Lempuyangan

Executive and premium economy class

- Senja Utama Yogya, to Pasar Senen and Lempuyangan
- Fajar Utama Yogya, to Pasar Senen and Lempuyangan
- Lodaya, to Bandung and Solo Balapan

Business and economy class

- Logawa, to Purwokerto and Jember

Premium economy class

- Jaka Tingkir, to Pasar Senen and Purwosari (several times only)

Economy class

- Progo, to Pasar Senen and Lempuyangan
- Kahuripan, to Kiaracondong and Blitar
- Pasundan, to Kiaracondong and Surabaya Gubeng
- Bengawan, to Pasar Senen and Purwosari

=== Local ===
- Joglosemarkerto, to Yogyakarta, Cilacap, Solo Balapan, and Semarang Tawang

=== Commuter rail and airport rail link ===
- Prambanan Express, to Yogyakarta and Kutoarjo
- Yogyakarta Int'l Airport Rail Link, to Yogyakarta and Yogyakarta International Airport

== Gallery ==
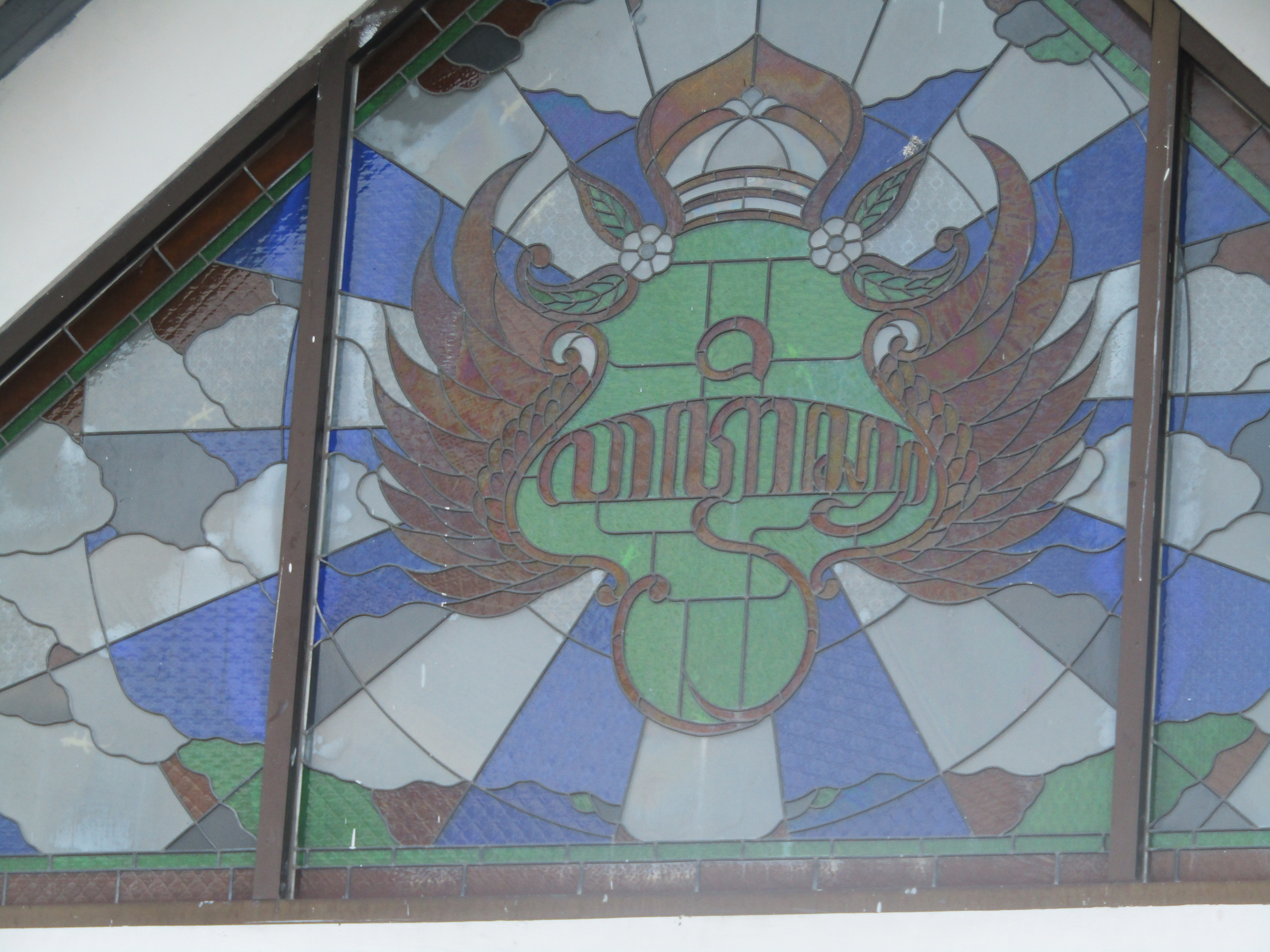
The "Wates" writings in Javanese script stylized in a form of Yogyakarta's Praja Cihna emblem

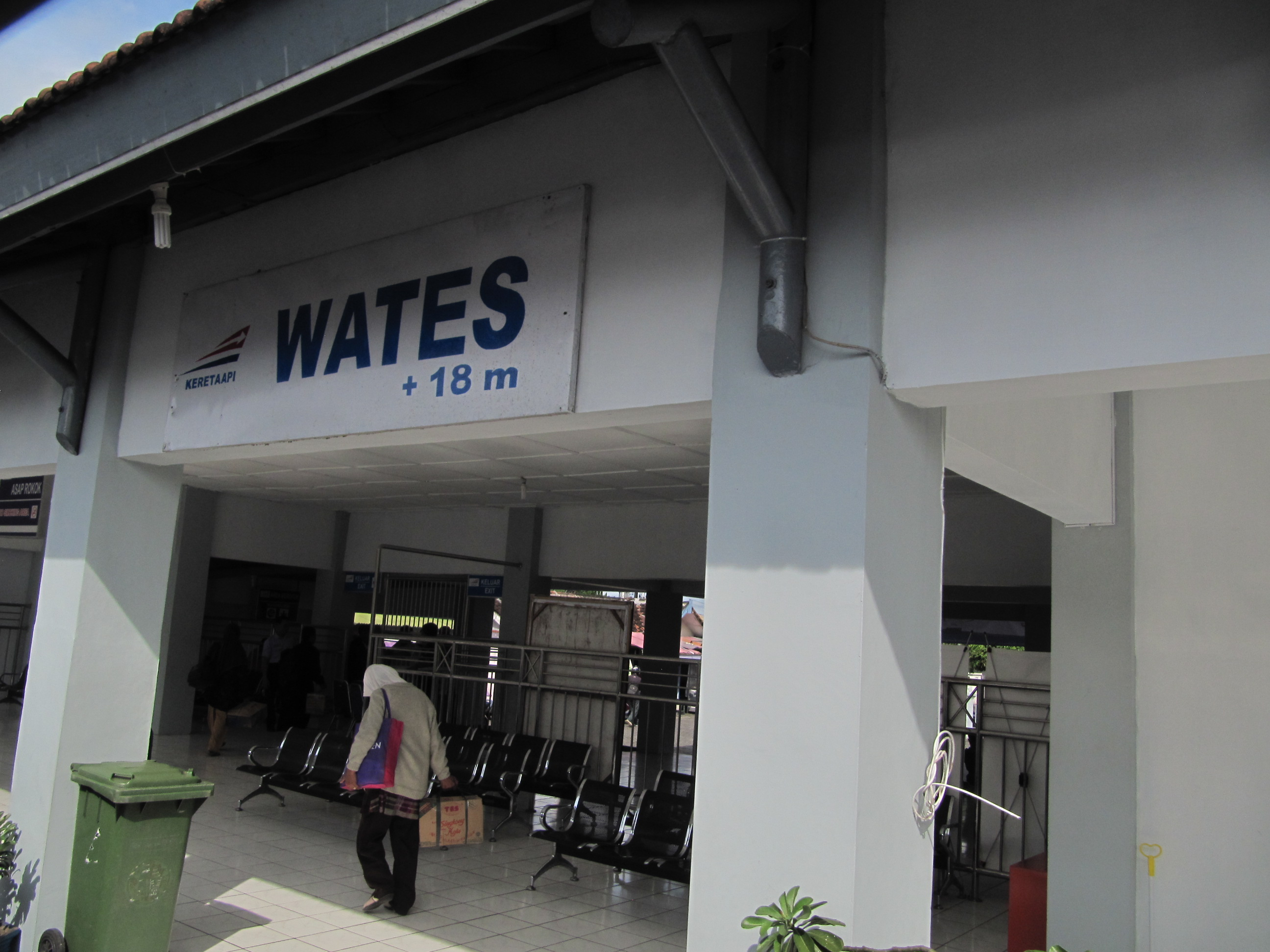
The 2011 version of the signage of the station. Taken in 2013.

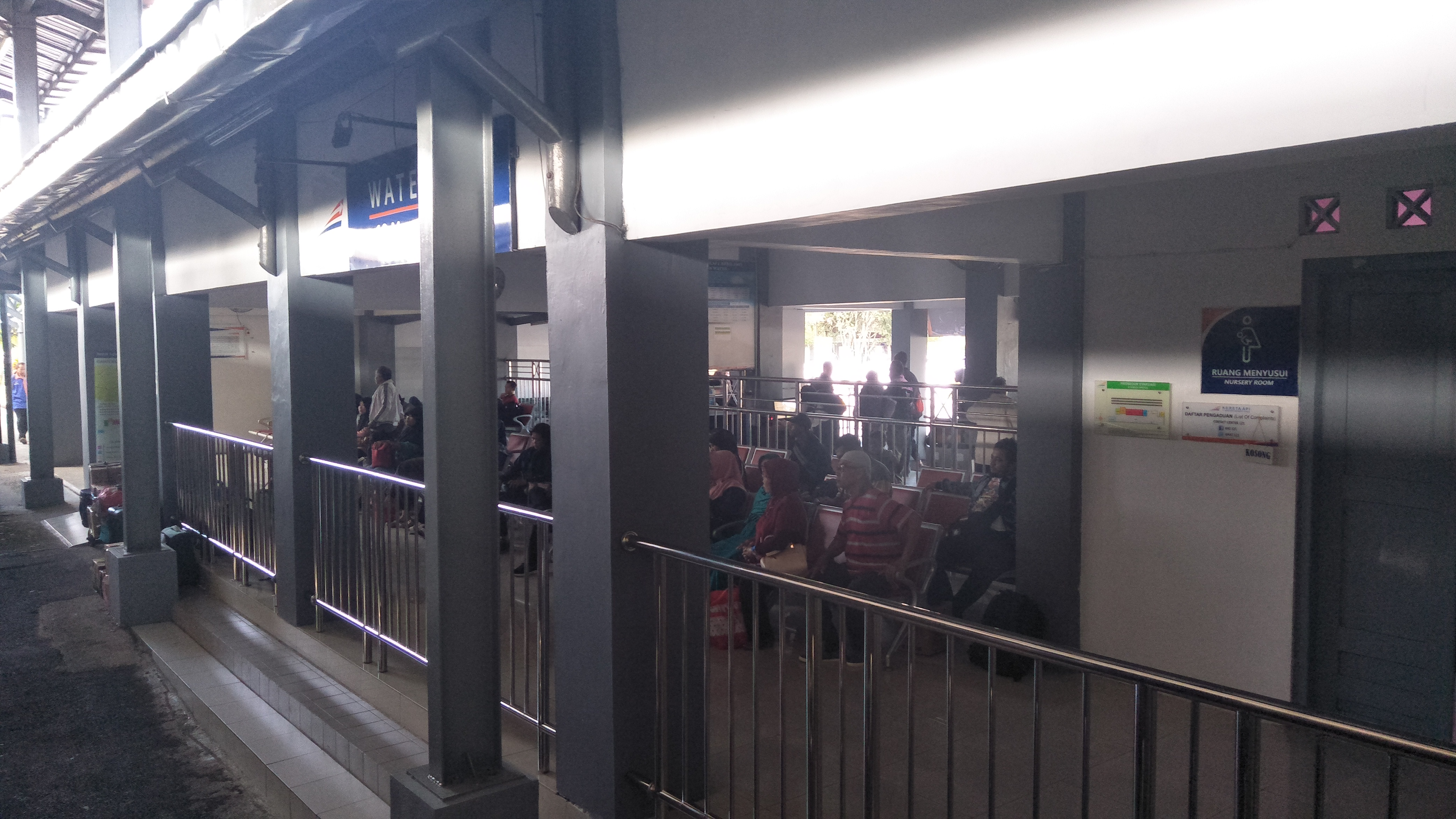
The station building in 2019, with the 2017 version of the signage and roof overcapping pillars
