= Purnawan Junadi =

Indonesian physician, academic administrator and politician

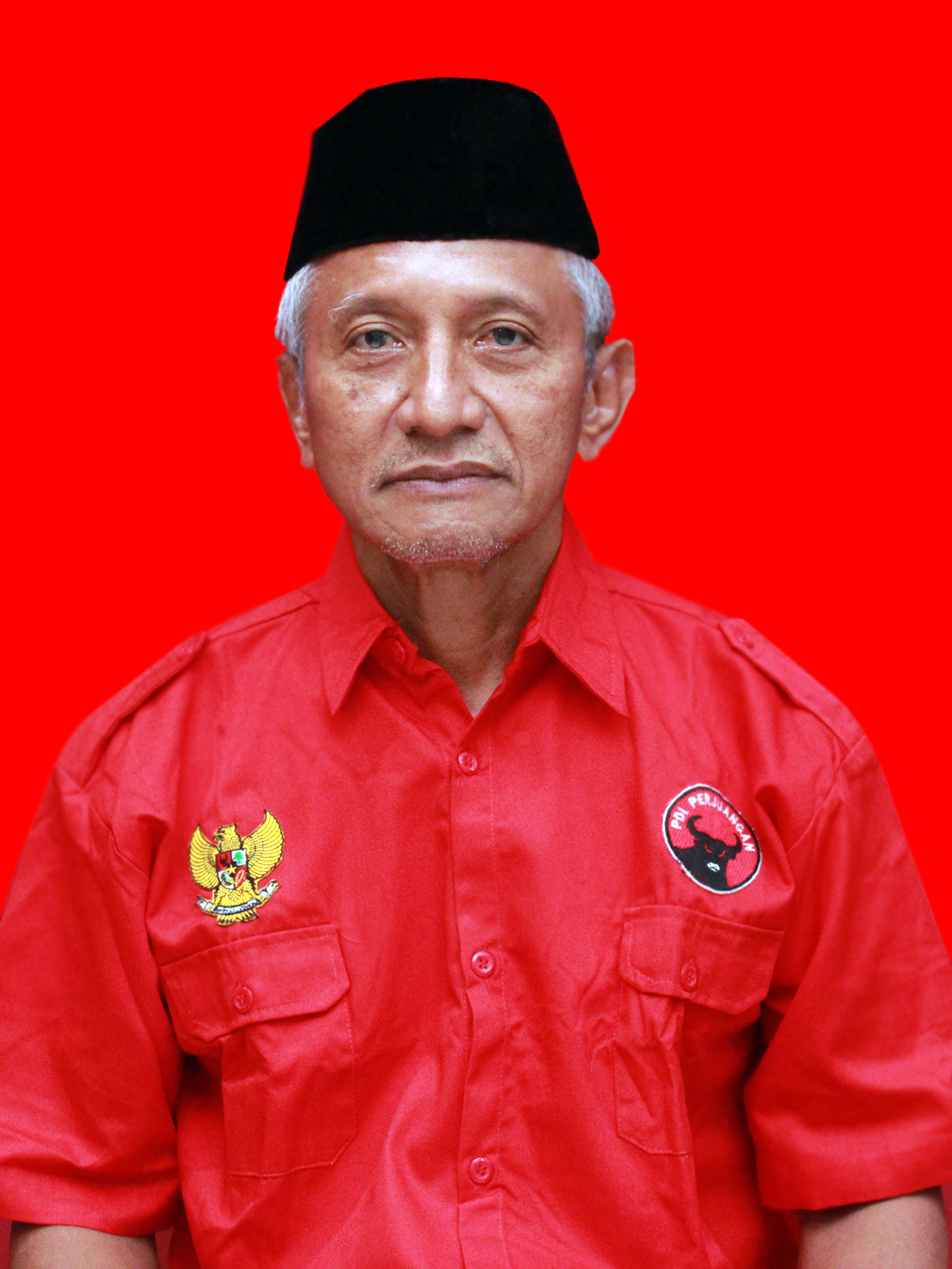

Chairman of the Postgraduate School of the University of Indonesia
- In office 6 September 2004 – 2008
- Preceded by: Wahyuning Ramelan
- Succeeded by: Chandra Wijaya

Personal details
- Born: June 11, 1953 (age 73) Wates, Kulon Progo, Yogyakarta, Indonesia
- Education: University of Indonesia (dr, Prof); University of Michigan School of Public Health (MPH, PhD)

Academic background
- Thesis: The Effect of Village Modernization and the Family Planning and Nutrition Program on Household Knowledge and Behavior in East Java and Bali, Indonesia (1987)

Academic work
- Discipline: Public health
- Sub-discipline: Health policy and management

Purnawan Junadi (born 11 June 1953) is an Indonesian academic administrator, politician, and physician. He is a professor of health administration and policy at the University of Indonesia and served as the chairman of the university's postgraduate school from 2004 to 2008. He is currently the chairman of the Indonesian Telemedicine Alliance and the Continuing Medical Education Agency, with the latter being under the Indonesian Medical Association.

== Education ==
Purnawan was born on 11 June 1953 in Wates, Kulon Progo. He received his bachelor's degree in medicine from the University of Indonesia in 1978, where he became a contributor to the university's student magazine, Aescalapius. His master's degree and doctorate in public health was obtained from the University of Michigan in 1987.

== Career ==
Purnawan began his career as a lecturer at the University of Indonesia's Public Health Faculty, with a specialty in health services management. He taught regional health planning, logistics management, own risk and solvency assessment, and strategic leadership and systems thinking. He then joined the postgraduate school, where he served as the coordinator of the urban development programme.

Purnawan was selected as the chairman of the university's postgraduate school on 30 August 2004 and assumed office on 6 September 2004. Prior to his selection, he unsuccessfully sought selection as the dean of the public health faculty. He announced his plans to introduce a "part-time student" system, providing graduate certificates after each semester, and improving faculty staffing. During his tenure, he was appointed as a full professor in health administration and policy at the university on 1 December 2006. His inaugural speech as a full professor, titled Jalan Cerdas Menuju Sehat, was read on 1 September 2007.

In the 2019 Indonesian general election, Purnawan was nominated as a candidate for the House of Representatives from the East Java 10 electoral district, covering Lamongan Regency and Gresik Regency. He was one of the two full professors nominated by the Indonesian Democratic Party of Struggle, alongside Hasbullah Thabrany, who was also from the public health faculty. Purnawan failed to get elected in the election.

During the COVID-19 pandemic in Indonesia, Purnawan was appointed to a number of government and medicine organization positions. He was appointed as the lead member of the stunting prevention acceleration team, serving directly under the vice-presidential secretariat of Ma'ruf Amin. In his position, Purnawan stated the difficulties government faced to increase the stunting reduction rate.

He served as the chairman of the Indonesian Telemedicine Alliance, where he was involved in promoting telemedicine in Indonesia. He oversaw the expansion of telemedicine services outside Indonesia's main Java island and the support for telemedicine services during the social distancing policy. In order to increase the effectiveness of the handling the COVID-19 pandemic, the Indonesian Telemedicine Alliance signed cooperation agreements with the Ministry of Health and the United Nations Development Programme. Purnawan also served as the chairman of the Continuing Medical Education Agency under the Indonesian Medical Association. Under his leadership, the agency published a guidance for continuing medical education programs.

== Personal life ==
Purnawan is married to Jenni Christiani and has two children.
