= Wates, Kulon Progo =

Coordinates: 7°51′42″S 110°09′28″E

Wates is the capital of Kulon Progo Regency, in Yogyakarta Special Region on Java, Indonesia. It is located about 25 km to the west of Yogyakarta.

== Climate ==
Wates has a tropical monsoon climate (Am) with moderate to little rainfall from May to September and heavy rainfall from October to April.

Climate data for Wates
Month	Jan	Feb	Mar	Apr	May	Jun	Jul	Aug	Sep	Oct	Nov	Dec	Year
Mean daily maximum °C (°F)	30.9 (87.6)	31.1 (88.0)	31.2 (88.2)	31.9 (89.4)	31.6 (88.9)	31.3 (88.3)	30.7 (87.3)	31.0 (87.8)	31.2 (88.2)	31.7 (89.1)	31.1 (88.0)	30.9 (87.6)	31.2 (88.2)
Daily mean °C (°F)	27.1 (80.8)	27.1 (80.8)	27.2 (81.0)	27.6 (81.7)	27.3 (81.1)	26.5 (79.7)	25.7 (78.3)	25.9 (78.6)	26.4 (79.5)	27.2 (81.0)	27.1 (80.8)	27.1 (80.8)	26.9 (80.3)
Mean daily minimum °C (°F)	23.3 (73.9)	23.2 (73.8)	23.3 (73.9)	23.4 (74.1)	23.0 (73.4)	21.7 (71.1)	20.7 (69.3)	20.8 (69.4)	21.7 (71.1)	22.7 (72.9)	23.2 (73.8)	23.3 (73.9)	22.5 (72.6)
Average rainfall mm (inches)	329 (13.0)	301 (11.9)	306 (12.0)	138 (5.4)	119 (4.7)	51 (2.0)	54 (2.1)	23 (0.9)	24 (0.9)	125 (4.9)	237 (9.3)	283 (11.1)	1,990 (78.2)
Source: Climate-Data.org

== See also ==
- Wates railway station
- List of districts of the Special Region of Yogyakarta
