= Yogyakarta International Airport =

Airport in Indonesia

Yogyakarta International Airport Bandar Udara Internasional Yogyakarta ꦥꦥꦤ꧀ꦄꦁꦒꦼꦒꦤꦆꦤ꧀ꦠꦼꦂꦤꦱꦶꦪꦺꦴꦤꦭ꧀ꦔꦪꦺꦴꦒꦾꦏꦂꦠ _{Papan Anggêgana Internasiyonal Ngayogyakarta}

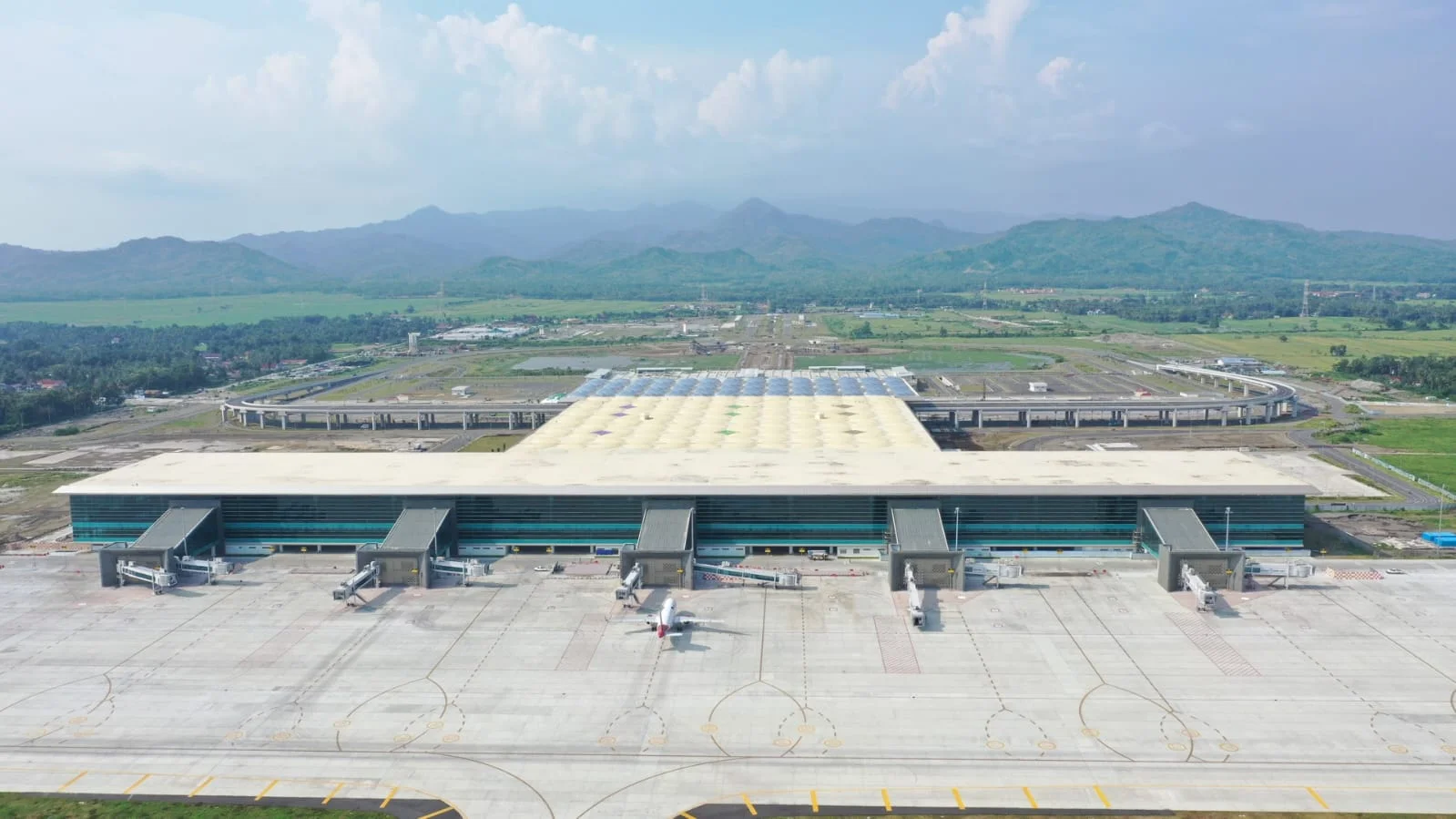
- IATA: YIA; ICAO: WAHI

Summary
- Airport type: Public
- Owner: Government of Indonesia
- Operator: InJourney Airports
- Serves: Special Region of Yogyakarta and parts of southern Central Java
- Location: Temon District, Kulon Progo Regency, Special Region of Yogyakarta, Indonesia
- Opened: 6 May 2019; 7 years ago
- Focus city for: Garuda Indonesia
- Operating base for: Lion Air; Super Air Jet
- Time zone: WIB (UTC+07:00)
- Elevation AMSL: 7 m (23 ft)
- Coordinates: 7°54′27″S 110°03′16″E
- Website: www.yogyakarta-airport.co.id

Map
- Interactive map of Yogyakarta International Airport

Runways
Direction	Length		Surface
Direction	m	ft	Surface
11/29	3,250	10,663	Asphalt

Statistics (2024)
- Passengers: 4,275,848 (▼0.7%)
- Cargo (tonnes): 15,672 (▲34.4%)
- Aircraft movements: 29,290 (▼4.5%)
- Source: DGCA

Yogyakarta International Airport (IATA: YIA, ICAO: WAHI) is an international airport located in the Temon district of Kulon Progo Regency, in Yogyakarta, Indonesia. The airport is located approximately 45 km (28 mi) from the city of Yogyakarta, serving both the Yogyakarta Special Region and nearby Central Javan cities such as Purworejo, Kebumen, Cilacap, and Magelang. It functions as the primary gateway to Yogyakarta and its surrounding areas, including popular tourist destinations like Borobudur Temple. It is the largest of the three airports in the Yogyakarta Special Region, along with Adisutjipto Airport, which was formerly the main airport and is located closer to the Yogyakarta city center, and Gading Airfield in Wonosari, Gunung Kidul Regency, which is used exclusively as a military base. The airport is operated by InJourney Airports, formerly Angkasa Pura I.

The airport offers domestic flights to major Indonesian cities such as Jakarta, Denpasar, Balikpapan, and Makassar, as well as international routes to destinations including Malaysia and Singapore. The airport was developed to replace the overcapacity of Adisutjipto Airport, which could not be expanded due to limited land and its proximity to densely populated areas. Partial operations began on 6 May 2019 with the arrival of a Citilink flight from Jakarta's Halim Perdanakusuma International Airport. Full operations commenced on 29 March 2020, with all scheduled commercial flights—except turboprop, cargo, and other non-commercial services—relocated from the old airport.

== History ==
=== Background ===
Prior to the opening of the airport, Yogyakarta was primarily served by Adisutjipto Airport, located in Maguwo near the city center, which has already existed since the Dutch colonial era. The airport was already suffering from chronic overcapacity due to its limited size. Expansion of the airport is no longer feasible due to its location in a densely populated urban area and the limited availability of surrounding land. Residential buildings had already surrounded the airport on the north and south sides, while rivers bordered it to the west and east.Yanuar In addition, a railway line ran along the northern boundary of the airport. The airport has a single runway measuring 2,250 metres, which is insufficient to accommodate wide-body aircraft. The terminal was originally designed to handle about 1.2 million passengers annually; in 2016, it served over 7.2 million. The aircraft parking area was limited, accommodating only seven aircraft. This capacity was considered insufficient to meet the needs of Yogyakarta’s airport. With only seven parking stands available, delayed aircraft often had to wait for a vacant slot, causing incoming planes to circle the airport before landing.

In addition, Adisutjipto Airport’s commercial operations were shared with the Indonesian Air Force, which owns the land on which the airport is situated. As a result, it functioned as a civil enclave within a military airbase, a situation that often disrupted air traffic. Moreover, the airport also served as a base for Indonesian military aviation, not only the Air Force, resulting in very high levels of flight activity. With the steadily increasing number of passengers traveling to and from Yogyakarta each year, it was decided that a new airport needed to be constructed.

=== Construction and inauguration ===
Plans for the construction of a new airport for Yogyakarta been under consideration since 2009, although the project experienced several delays. After a series of surveys, two locations—Temon and Gadingharjo—were found to meet the obstacle clearance requirements for the construction of the new airport. Ultimately, the southern coastal area of Temon District in Kulon Progo Regency was selected as it best satisfied the technical and operational requirements for the construction of a new airport.

Between 2012 and 2017, about 587 hectares of land were acquired and cleared to make way for the development. The land acquisition process, however, was met with controversy and resistance from local residents who opposed the project. Construction officially commenced with the Babat Alas Nawung Kridha ceremony—a traditional Javanese ritual symbolizing the clearing of land to mark a new beginning—which was attended by then-President Joko Widodo.

Construction of the airport took about two years, with partial operations beginning on 29 April 2019 and full operations commencing on 29 March 2020. The construction of the airport was accompanied by several controversies, including allegations of human rights violations related to land acquisition from local communities and concerns over environmental degradation due to the clearing of farmland. After the launch of full operations, most airlines relocated their flights from Adisutjipto Airport to the new airport, except for turboprop and non-scheduled flights. The airport was officially inaugurated by President Joko Widodo on 28 August 2020. The total investment for the project was about Rp. 11.3 trillion, comprising Rp. 4.2 trillion for land acquisition and Rp. 7.1 trillion for the development of land-side and air-side facilities.

The airport faced financial challenges when it opened during the COVID-19 pandemic. Due to a lack of passenger and aircraft traffic, the airport's operations led to a debt of about 32 trillion Rupiah for its operator at the time, Angkasa Pura I. In 2021, the airport saw only about 980,000 passengers, just 10% of the expected. Following the easing of community restrictions and the decline of the pandemic, the airport saw an increase in passenger and air traffic.

=== Controversies ===
About 40 percent of the land designated for the construction of Yogyakarta International Airport is classified as Paku Alam Ground, a type of land traditionally under the control of the Paku Alam nobility. The remaining land is owned by local residents. The airport is located in Temon District, Kulon Progo Regency, between Congot Beach and Glagah Beach, and includes parts of Palihan, Sindutan, Jangkaran, and Glagah villages.

Local residents were first informed about the airport development in 2011. Public dissemination regarding the project was conducted in 2014 by the Regional Government, Angkasa Pura I, and the National Land Agency (Badan Pertanahan Nasional or BPN) of Kulon Progo Regency. Opposition to the project was reported in various media outlets. Affected residents expressed concerns that the airport's construction would eliminate agricultural land that served as their primary source of livelihood. In addition to economic concerns, residents also cited environmental and safety issues, as the area is considered prone to natural disasters such as tsunamis. The development area also includes sites considered sacred and of historical significance to the local community.

Opposition to the airport began with the establishment of a grassroots organization called Wahana Tri Tunggal (WTT). Later, some members formed the Community Association for Refusing Kulon Progo Evictions (Paguyuban Warga Penolak Penggusuran Kulon Progo or PWPP-KP). Initially, WTT maintained an absolute opposition to the project. However, their position shifted over time, and they eventually agreed to support the development on the condition that there would be a reassessment of compensation for buildings, crops, and supporting facilities. In contrast, PWPP-KP has continued to oppose the project unconditionally. As of July 2018, 86 families had not agreed to sell their land for the airport development.

On 28 November 2017, the Chairperson of the Ombudsman of the Republic of Indonesia requested a delay in the eviction of residents, citing an ongoing investigation into potential maladministration in the land acquisition process. The National Commission on Human Rights noted that the handling of the conflict surrounding the airport was relatively better compared to similar disputes in other regions. However, the commission also stated that human rights violations had occurred during the process of clearing resident-occupied land.

== Facilities and development ==
=== Facilities ===
Departure hall

Check-in area

Boarding gate

Yogyakarta International Airport claimed to be one of the largest airports in Indonesia, featuring a passenger terminal covering 219,000 square meters and a total airport area spanning 587 hectares. On the landside, the current capacity accommodates up to 9 million passengers annually, which is almost 6 times greater than Adisutjipto Airport’s capacity of just 1.6 million passengers per year. The terminal also includes 1,500 square meters of commercial space capable of hosting 300 MSMEs (micro, small, and medium enterprises), while the 880-square-meter area in the connecting building can accommodate 170 MSMEs. These tenant zones are collectively branded as Pasar Kotagede.

The airport's landside is equipped with a range of facilities, including 96 check-in counters, 12 immigration counters in the departure area and 8 in the arrival area, 74 escalators, 41 elevators, and 38 travelators. Other amenities include 60 restrooms, 13 nursery rooms, 45 prayer rooms (musala), and 2 children's play areas. Security features include 4 x-ray cabins at Screening Check Point (SCP) 1, along with 16 x-ray cabins and 16 walk-through metal detectors (WTMDs) in the domestic terminal, and 7 x-ray cabins and 7 WTMDs in the international terminal at SCP 2. The airport also has a baggage handling system (BHS) and Level 4 Hold Baggage Screening (HBS). In addition, there is also a parking building that can accommodate up to 4,900 two-wheeled vehicles, 1,230 four-wheeled vehicles, as well as an outdoor parking area that can accommodate 61 buses and 402 four-wheeled vehicles.

On the airside, the airport offers 17 aircraft parking stands, capable of handling 5 wide-body and 12 narrow-body aircraft, or alternatively 22 narrow-body aircraft, supported by 10 jetbridges and a cargo terminal with a daily capacity of 500 tons. The runway measures 3,250 meters in length and 45 meters in width, with a Pavement Classification Number (PCN) of 93 F/C/X/T, making it suitable for the heaviest aircraft such as the Boeing 777 and the largest aircraft like the Airbus A380.

The airport is also equipped with an early warning system for earthquakes, tsunamis, and extreme weather events. It is engineered to withstand earthquakes of up to magnitude 8.8 on the Richter scale and tsunamis up to 12 meters high. This level of resilience is crucial, given the region's high seismic activity—most notably the major earthquake in 2006. To address the flood risks facing the airport, a comprehensive flood mitigation plan is in place. This includes river normalization, enhancement of river flow capacity, and the construction of pump stations, retention basins, and an improved drainage system. The flood mitigation facilities were completed in 2025.

=== Further development ===
According to the original plan, the first phase of development will expand the airport’s capacity to 14 million passengers, which is projected to be sufficient through 2027. The second phase is scheduled to begin in 2027, or once annual traffic is projected to reach 14 million passengers. In this phase, Yogyakarta International Airport is targeted to handle up to 20 million passengers annually. The third phase of development is planned for 2036, further increasing the airport’s capacity to accommodate up to 25 million passengers. In the long-term master plan, the runway will be extended and widened to 3,600 meters in length and 60 meters in width. The passenger terminal will be expanded to 194,428 square meters, while the apron will be enlarged to provide 31 aircraft parking stands.

=== Airport city development ===
The area surrounding the airport is planned to be developed into an integrated airport city, featuring a wide range of facilities including retail centers, hotels, a theme park, warehouses, office parks, dormitories, MICE (Meetings, Incentives, Conventions, and Exhibitions) facilities, a university campus, a hospital, and a sports center. Angkasa Pura I, the airport operator, aims to transform the area into a new gateway for cultural and leisure activities, as well as a hub for business and commercial lifestyles. The development will be carried out in three phases. The first phase, covering 166,421 square meters and originally scheduled for 2022 to 2024, includes the construction of Warehouse 1, a build-to-suit warehouse, a theme park, retail areas, and a three-star transit hotel. The second phase, covering 187,269 square meters and planned for 2026 to 2027, will feature Warehouse 2, an additional theme park, dormitories, an office park, retail areas, and a four-star hotel. The third phase, spanning 189,189 square meters and scheduled for 2029 to 2030, will include the development of a hospital, a university, a sports center, another office park, retail areas, dormitories, a budget three-star transit hotel, and additional MICE facilities. To support this development, an 85-hectare plot of land is being prepared. In addition, the Yogyakarta provincial government plans to collaborate with the Japan International Cooperation Agency (JICA) to ensure the effective and sustainable implementation of the airport city project.

== Airlines and destinations ==
=== Passenger ===
Airlines	Destinations
AirAsia	Kuala Lumpur–International
Airfast Indonesia	Charter: Jakarta–Soekarno-Hatta, Timika
Batik Air	Jakarta–Soekarno-Hatta
Citilink	Balikpapan, Batam, Jakarta–Soekarno-Hatta, Makassar, Palembang
Garuda Indonesia	Denpasar, Jakarta–Soekarno-Hatta; Seasonal: Jeddah, Medina
Lion Air	Balikpapan, Banjarmasin, Makassar, Medan, Pekanbaru
Malaysia Airlines	Kuala Lumpur–International
Pelita Air	Balikpapan, Jakarta–Soekarno-Hatta
Scoot	Singapore
Sriwijaya Air	Jakarta–Soekarno-Hatta, Makassar
Super Air Jet	Balikpapan, Banjarmasin, Batam, Denpasar, Jakarta–Soekarno-Hatta, Jambi, Lombok, Padang, Palangkaraya, Palembang, Pangkal Pinang, Pontianak, Samarinda
TransNusa	Jakarta–Soekarno-Hatta

== Statistics ==
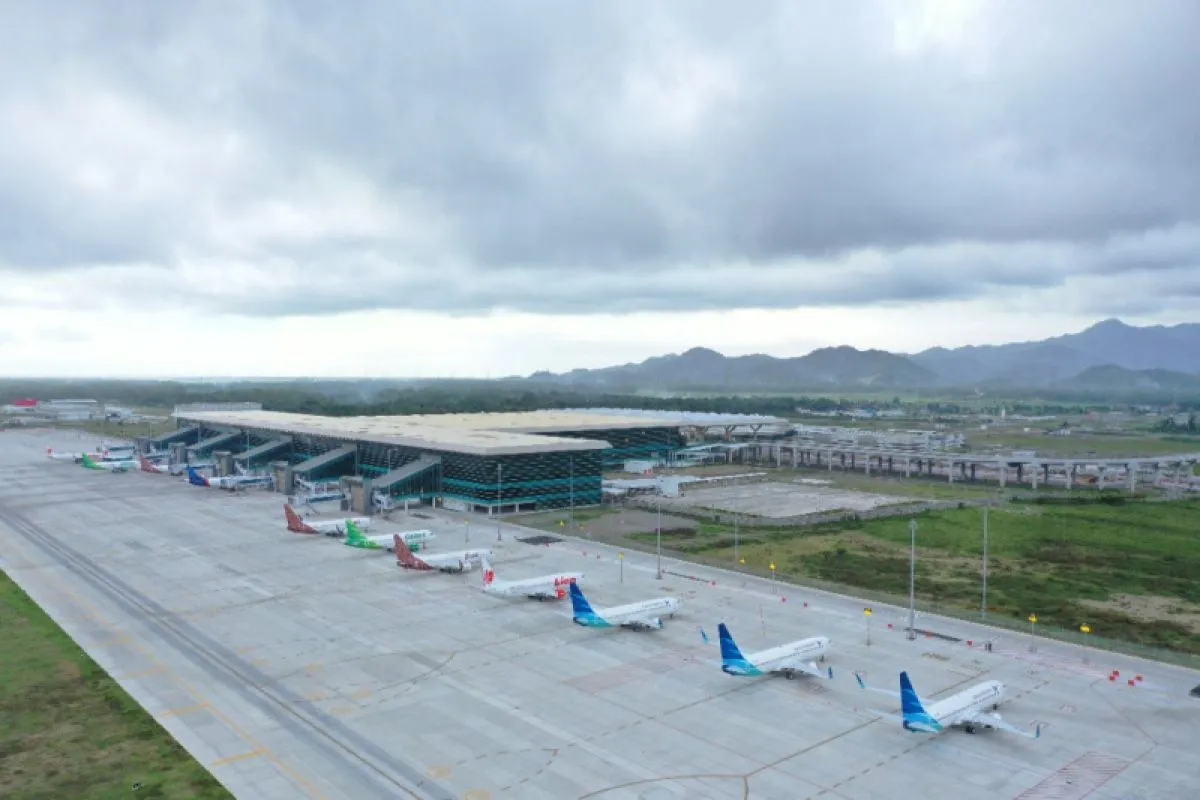
Aircraft of Garuda Indonesia, Lion Air, Batik Air, Citilink and Sriwijaya Air on the terminal apron at Yogyakarta International Airport

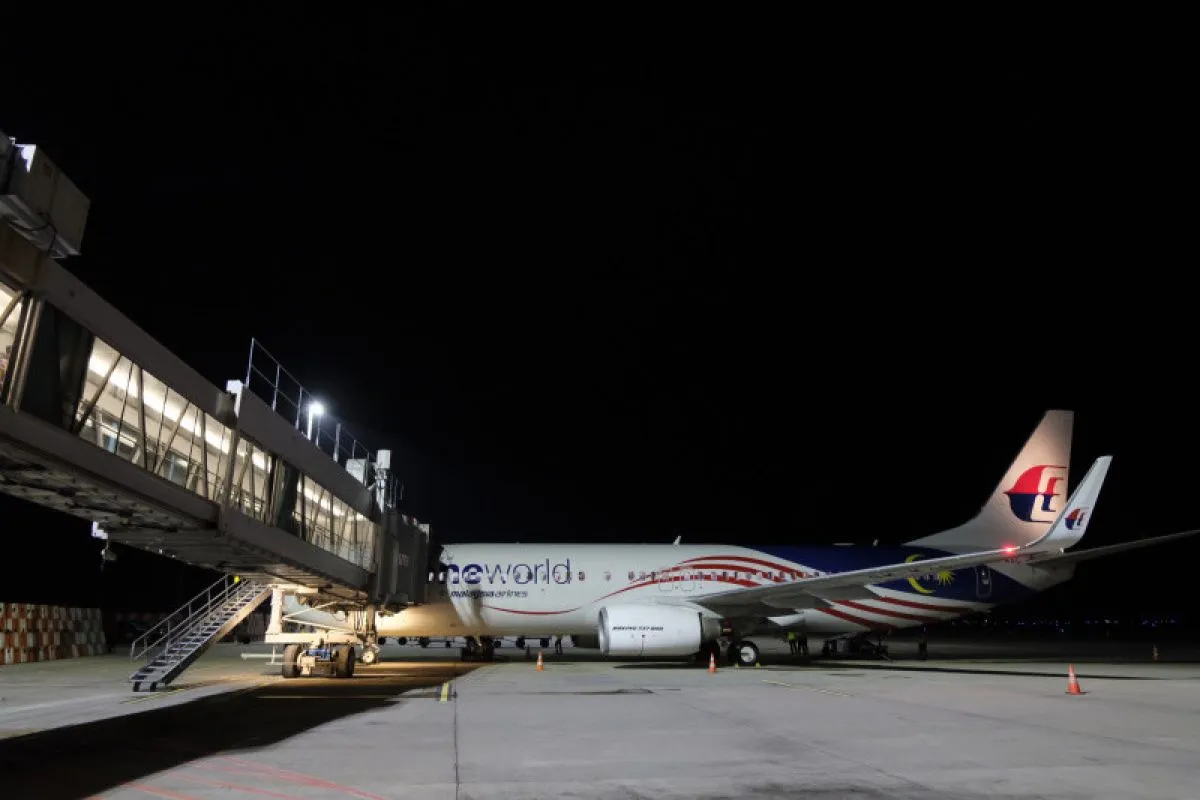
A Malaysia Airlines Boeing 737-800 at Yogyakarta International Airport

Annual passenger numbers and aircraft statistics
Year	Passengers handled	Passenger % change	Cargo (tonnes)	Cargo % change	Aircraft movements	Aircraft % change
2019	281,782	Steady	N/A	Steady	3,090	Steady
2020	996,750	▲253.7	6,576	Steady	11,812	▲282.3
2021	1,168,042	▲17.2	7,097	▲7.9	11,625	▼1.6
2022	2,939,888	▲151.7	8,162	▲15.0	21,027	▲80.9
2023	4,307,136	▲46.5	11,662	▲42.9	30,662	▲45.8
2024	4,275,848	▼0.7	15,672	▲34.4	29,290	▼4.5
^{Source: DGCA, BPS}

== Ground transportation ==
=== Road ===
At present DAMRI shuttle buses serve routes from YIA to Adisutjipto Airport, Wojo Station, Purworejo, Kebumen and Magelang. Another bus service Satelqu serves routes from YIA to Adisutjipto Airport, Cilacap and Purwokerto. The airport is planned to be connected to Yogyakarta city center via toll road. A planned toll road would link YIA with another planned toll roads, Yogyakarta-Solo Toll Road and Yogyakarta-Bawen Toll Road, as the complementary parts to the existing Semarang–Solo Toll Road of Trans-Java Toll Road network. There is provisions for the operation of Damri shuttle buses, SatelQu, airport taxis, online taxis, and trains via Wojo station to connect the airport with Borobudur.

=== Rail ===
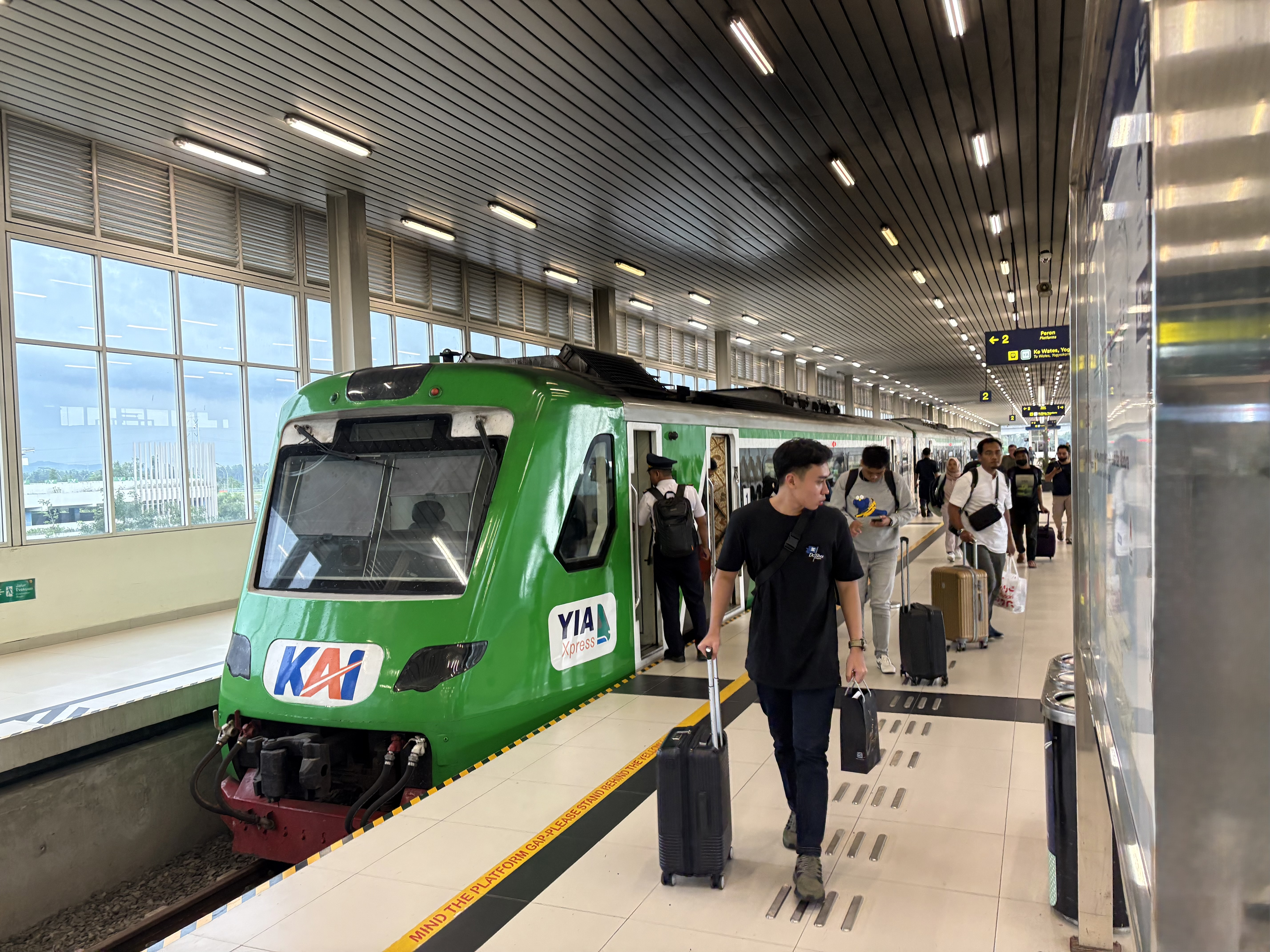
Yogyakarta International Airport Railway Station

The airport is connected to the rail network by the Yogyakarta International Airport Rail Link, which links the airport to Yogyakarta railway station, the city's main station, located 40 km away. This train service was initially operated with most of its schedules running to Wojo Station and a few extending to Kebumen Station starting in May 2019. The train stops at nearly every station along the route. When the airport was not yet connected to the railway line, a DAMRI shuttle bus was provided from Wojo Station (the closest station to the airport) to the airport, which is about 4 kilometers away. Following the opening of the airport branch line in September 2021, the route was extended to Yogyakarta International Airport.

By 2025, the Airport Train operates approximately 50 trips daily, with travel times ranging from 35 to 39 minutes. The three stations served by the Airport Train are Yogyakarta Station, Wates Station, and Yogyakarta Airport Station. The service offers two types of trains: the regular Airport Train and the Airport Train Xpress. The regular Airport Train is a subsidized service, making stops at Wates Station, while the Airport Train Xpress is a commercial service that bypasses Wates Station, offering a quicker travel time.

To anticipate increased passenger mobility, especially on weekends, KAI also operates additional services. One of them is a departure schedule at 06:00 WIB, which specifically operates on Fridays, Saturdays, and Sundays to accommodate the surge in both tourists and business travelers.

== See also ==
- Adisutjipto Airport
- Kulon Progo Regency
