= Kulon Progo Regency =

Regency in Yogyakarta, Indonesia

Kulon Progo Regency Kabupaten Kulon Progo ꦏꦧꦸꦥꦠꦺꦤ꧀ꦏꦸꦭꦺꦴꦤ꧀ꦥꦿꦒ
- Regency
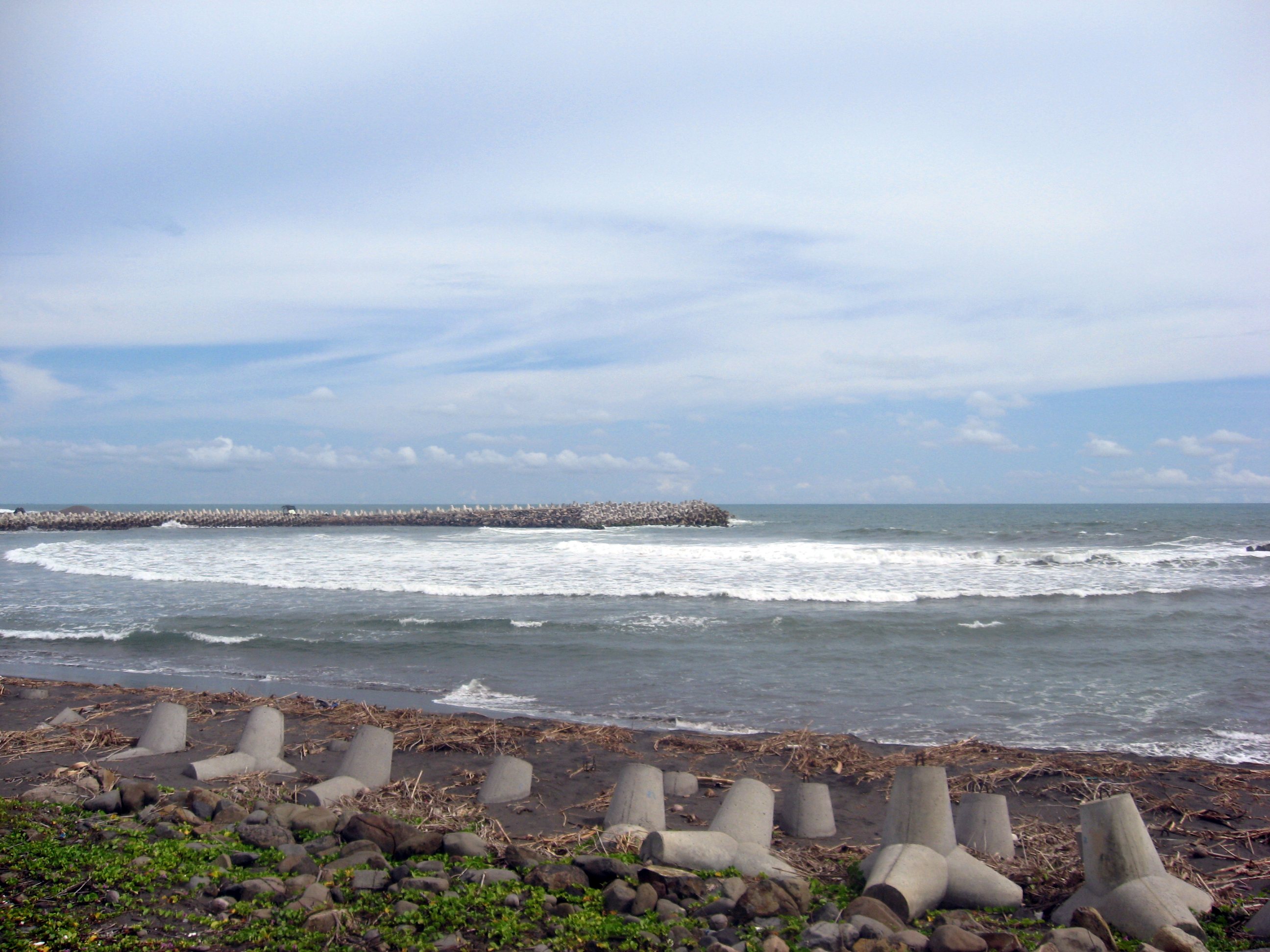
- Glagah Beach, one of the black sand beaches in Kulon Progo regency.

- Seal
- Motto: Binangun
- Kulon Progo Regency in Special Region of Yogyakarta
- Coordinates: 7°38′42″S 110°1′37″E
- Country: Indonesia
- Special Administrative Region: Yogyakarta
- Capital: Wates

Government
  - Regent: Agung Setyawan
  - Vice Regent: Ambar Purwoko

Area
  - Total: 586.28 km^{2} (226.36 sq mi)

Population (mid 2023 estimate)
  - Total: 443,053
  - Density: 755.70/km^{2} (1,957.3/sq mi)
- Time zone: UTC+7 (WIB)
- Post Code: 55000
- Area code: 0274
- Website: kulonprogokab.go.id

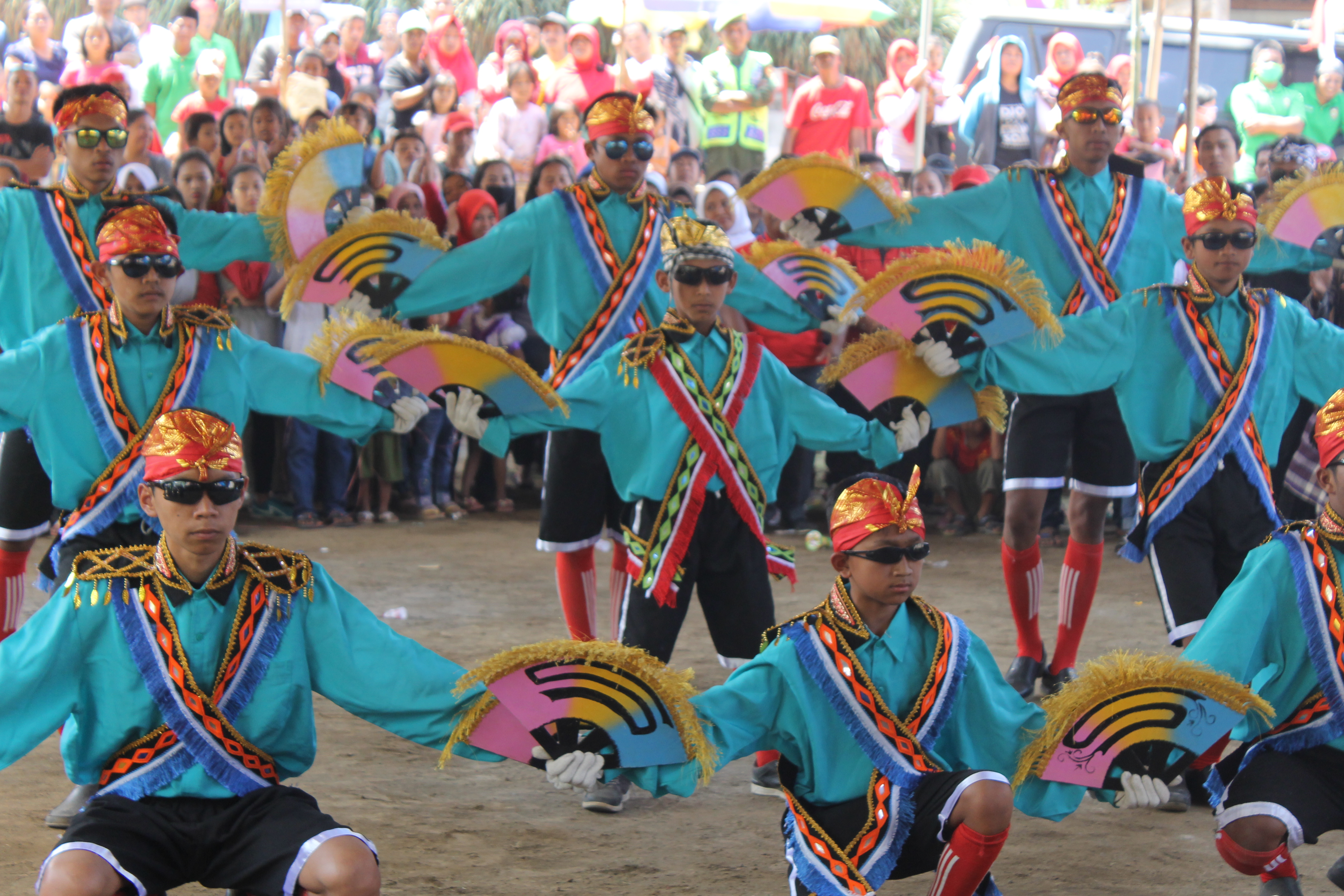
Rodat, an Islamic dance of Kulon Progo

Kulon Progo Regency (Javanese: ꦏꦸꦭꦺꦴꦤ꧀ꦥꦿꦒ, romanized: Kulon Praga, Javanese pronunciation: [ˈkulɔn ˈprɔɡɔ], Indonesian pronunciation: [ˈkulɔn pəˈroɡo]) is one of the four regencies within the Yogyakarta Special Region, Indonesia. It is located on the island of Java, with a coastline on the south of that island. The regency's name stems from the fact that it is situated to the west (in Javanese "kulon") of the Progo River. The capital is Wates. The greatest part of the population of the regency work as farmers. Kulon Progo Regency is surrounded by the Menoreh Hills. The area of the regency is 586.28 km^{2}, and the population was 388,755 at the 2010 census and 436,395 at the 2020 census; the official estimate as of mid-2023 was 443,053 - comprising 219,451 males and 223,602 females.

== History ==
In 1674, Keraton Mataram, Yogyakarta was attacked by Trunojoyo who received assistance from Macassar, resulting in damage to the palace; the king Amangkurat I had to flee and asked the Netherlands for help, till he died in Tegal during flight.

To anticipate attacks from Trunojoyo's followers, in 1677 the palace of Mataram led by Amangkurat II as the crown prince of Amangkurat I asked for the regent Ponorogo to obtain the palace protection by bala Warok famous skilled in war and asked for help from the Dutch colonial to capture Trunojoyo. After Mataram palace was guarded by Warok of Ponorogo, Tronojoyo had difficulties to penetrate the palace and was arrested and finally sentenced to death in 1679.

The Warok who managed to protect the palace got the prize a place to stay in the west of Mataram palace to facilitate the palace defence in case of an attack against the palace. The place was named Kulon Ponorogo and is now known as Kulon Progo which means Keraton Mataram western Ponorogo.

The area which currently includes the regency of Kulon Progo was - until the end of Dutch colonial rule - the territory of two regencies, namely the former Kulon Progo (which was a regency of the Ngayogyakarta Sultanate) and Adikarto (which was a regency of the Pakualaman Duchy). Both regencies were merged into Kulon Progo administration on 15 October 1951.

== Administrative districts ==
Kulon Progo Regency is divided into twelve districts (kapanewon), listed below with their areas and their populations at the 2010 census and the 2020 census, together with the official estimates as of mid-2023. The table also includes the locations of the district administrative centres, the number of administrative villages (classed as kalurahan) in each district, and its post code.

Kode Wilayah	Name of District (kapanewon)	Area in km^{2}	Pop'n census 2010	Pop'n census 2020	Pop'n estimate mid 2023	Admin centre	No. of villages	Post code
31.01.01	Temon	36.30	24,471	28,263	28,911	Temon Kulon	15	55654
31.01.02	Wates	32.00	43,995	48,738	49,303	Bendungan	8	55651
31.01.03	Panjatan	44.59	33,397	38,179	38,948	Gotakan	11	55655
31.01.04	Galur	32.91	29,120	32,047	32,363	Brosot	7	55661
31.01.05	Lendah	35.59	36,447	40,356	40,820	Jatirejo	6	55663
31.01.06	Sentolo	52.65	44,525	49,961	50,714	Salamrejo	8	55664
31.01.07	Pengasih	61.66	45,175	52,514	53,809	Pengasih	7	55652
31.01.08	Kokap	73.80	31,124	35,244	35,862	Hargorejo	5	55653
31.01.09	Girimulyo	54.90	21,893	24,088	24,323	Giripurwo	4	55674
31.01.10	Nanggulan	39.61	27,239	30,358	30,760	Jatisarono	6	55671
31.01.12	Kalibawang	52.96	26,802	29,448	29,763	Banjaroyo	4	55672
31.01.11	Samigaluh	69.29	24,681	27,199	27,477	Gerbosari	7	55673
	Totals	586.28	388,755	436,395	443,053	Wates	88	

== Forestry ==
Some local development efforts, carried on with the support of local cooperatives, work towards reafforestation activities. Trees being planted in the regency for both commercial and social reasons include Jati (Teak or Tecnona grandis), Mahogany (Swietenia mahagoni), Albasia (Albizia), and sono keliling (Blackwood or Rosewoon, Dalbergia latifolia).

== Yogyakarta International Airport ==
The central Indonesian government has indicated that a new airport for the Yogyakarta Special Region will be located in the Kulon Progo Regency. The plan is to build an airport with a 3,250 metre runway with 45 meters width and dual linear terminals to serve as an international gateway. The initial plan is to provide facilities to serve up to 10 million passengers per year for 28 aircraft together. Later expansions might accommodate up to 20 million passengers per year in phase-3. Around 637 hectares of land is being set aside for the project. Of this, 40% is classified as "Paku Alam (Sultan)" land while the rest belongs to local communities. The location is in Temon District between Congot Beach and Glagah Beach (which covers Palihan village, Sindutan village, Jangkaran village and Glagah village). In August 2013, 75 percent of land has been occupied.

An airport train has been planned to serve Yogyakarta and the airport. The rail use existing rail plus 4 kilometers new rail from Kedundang Station to Temon Airport. Due to new rail is only short, so the train hopefully will be ready when the airport is ready to operate.

Local residents of the Kulon Regency have been resisting the plans for the new airport. They claim there are several environmental issues with the proposed site as well as issues of safety, due to the area being at high risk for tsunamis and other natural disasters. There is also concern that the local residents who currently make their living by farming the area would be displaced.
