= Mayor of Yogyakarta =

- Wali Kota Yogyakarta
- Coat of arms of Yogyakarta

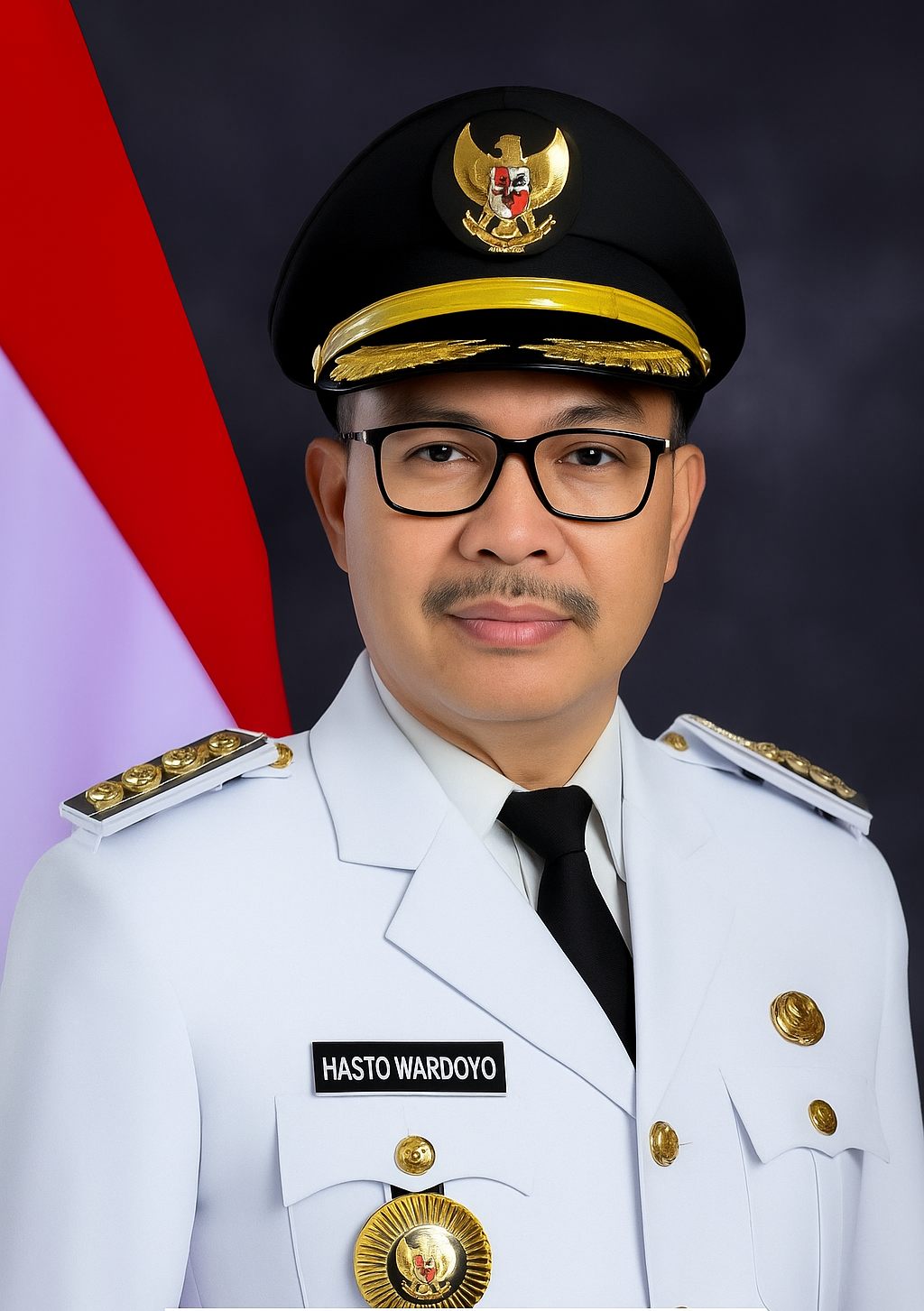
- Incumbent; Hasto Wardoyo since 20 February 2025
- Term length: 5 years
- Inaugural holder: Mohammad Enoch
- Formation: 21 May 1947
- Website: jogjakota.go.id

Mayor of Yogyakarta is the head of the second-level region who holds the government in Yogyakarta together with the Vice Mayor and 40 members of the Yogyakarta City Regional House of Representatives. The mayor and vice mayor of Yogyakarta are elected through general elections held every 5 years. The first mayor of Yogyakarta was Mohammad Enoch, who governed the city period from May 1947 to July 1947.

== List ==
The following is a list of the names of the Mayors of Yogyakarta from time to time.

Mayor of Yogyakarta
Num.	Portrait	Mayor	Beginning of office	End of Term	Political Party / Faction	Period	Note.	Vice mayor
1		Mohammad Enoch (1893–1965)	21 May 1947	3 July 1947	Independent	1		N/A
2		Soedarisman Poerwokoesoemo (1913–1988)	22 July 1947	January 1966	PNI	2		N/A
3		Soedjono A. Y.	January 1966	November 1975	ABRI–AD	3		N/A
4		H. Ahmad	November 1975	May 1981	ABRI–AD	4		N/A
5		Soegiarto	1981	1986	ABRI–AD	5		N/A
6		Djatmikanto Danumartono (born 1944)	13 May 1986	17 September 1991	ABRI–AD	6		N/A
7		R. Widagdo (1942–2018)	1991	1996	ABRI–AD	7		N/A
7		R. Widagdo (1942–2018)	1996	2001	ABRI–AD	8		N/A
8		Herry Zudianto (born 1955)	20 December 2001	20 December 2006	PAN	9		Syukri Fadholi; 2001-2006
8		Herry Zudianto (born 1955)	20 December 2006	20 December 2011	PAN	10		Haryadi Suyuti; 2006-2011
9		Haryadi Suyuti (born 1964)	20 December 2011	20 December 2016	Golkar	11		Imam Priyono; 2011-2016
		Sulistyo (Acting)	21 December 2016	22 May 2017	Independent	—		N/A
9		Haryadi Suyuti (born 1964)	22 May 2017	22 May 2022	Golkar	12 (2017)		Heroe Poerwadi; 2017-2022
		Sumadi (Acting) (born 1963)	22 May 2022	22 May 2023	Independent	—		N/A
		Singgih Raharjo (Acting) (born 1965)	22 May 2023	22 May 2024	Independent	—		N/A
		Sugeng Purwanto (Acting) (born 1965)	22 May 2024	20 February 2025	Independent	—		N/A
10		Hasto Wardoyo (born 1964)	20 February 2025	Incumbent	PDI-P	13 (2024)		Wawan Harmawan

== See also ==
- Yogyakarta
- List of incumbent regional heads and deputy regional heads in Special Region of Yogyakarta
