= List of incumbent regional heads and deputy regional heads in Special Region of Yogyakarta =

The following is an article about the list of Regional Heads and Deputy Regional Heads in 5 regencies/cities in Special Region of Yogyakarta who are currently still serving.

== List ==
Regency/ City	Photo of the Regent/ Mayor	Regent/ Mayor	Photo of Deputy Regent/ Mayor	Deputy Regent/ Mayor	Taking Office	End of Office (Planned)	Ref.
Bantul; Regency List of Regents/Deputy Regents	pus	Abdul Halim Muslih	pus	Aris Suharyanta	20 February 2025	20 February 2030	
Gunungkidul; Regency List of Regents/Deputy Regents	pus	Endah Subekti Kuntariningsih	pus	Joko Parwoto	20 February 2025	20 February 2030	
Kulon Progo; Regency List of Regents/Deputy Regents	pus	Agung Setyawan	pus	Ambar Purwoko	20 February 2025	20 February 2030	
Sleman; Regency List of Regents/Deputy Regents	pus	Harda Kiswaya	pus	Danang Maharsa	20 February 2025	20 February 2030	
Yogyakarta; City List of Mayors/Deputy mayors		Hasto Wardoyo		Wawan Harmawan	20 February 2025	20 February 2030	

Notes

- "Commencement of office" is the inauguration date at the beginning or during the current term of office. For acting regents/mayors, it is the date of appointment or extension as acting regent/mayor.
- Based on the Constitutional Court decision Number 27/PUU-XXII/2024, the Governor and Deputy Governor, Regent and Deputy Regent, and Mayor and Deputy Mayor elected in 2020 shall serve until the inauguration of the Governor and Deputy Governor, Regent and Deputy Regent, and Mayor and Deputy Mayor elected in the 2024 national simultaneous elections as long as the term of office does not exceed 5 (five) years.

== See also ==
- Special Region of Yogyakarta
