= Ministry of Population and Family Development =

Government ministry of Indonesia

Ministry of Population and Family Development/ National Population and Family Planning Board
- Kementerian Kependudukan dan Pembangunan Keluarga/ Badan Kependudukan dan Keluarga Berencana Nasional bkkbn

Agency overview
- Formed: 1970; 55 years ago
- Jurisdiction: Government of Indonesia
- Headquarters: Jalan Permata No. 1, Kompleks Bandara Halim Perdanakusuma, Jakarta Timur, DKI Jakarta, Indonesia
- Minister responsible: Wihaji, Minister of Population and Family Development
- Deputy Minister responsible: Ratu Ayu Isyana Bagoes Oka, Deputy Minister of Population and Family Development
- Website: www.kemendukbangga.go.id

The Ministry of Population and Family Development (Indonesian: Kementerian Kependudukan dan Pembangunan Keluarga/Badan Kependudukan dan Keluarga Berencana Nasional, abbreviated as BKKBN, written as bkkbn, previously written as BkkbN) is a ministry that organizes government affairs in the field of population and family development and the National Population and Family Planning Board is a Non-Ministerial Government Institution that carries out government duties in the field of population control and family planning.

== History ==
Family planning in Indonesia was started with founding of Planned Parenthood Federation (Perkumpulan Keluarga Berencana) on 23 December 1957 and became Indonesia Planned Parenthood Federation (Perkumpulan Keluarga Berencana Indonesia) and recognized by Department of Justice as legal person in 1967. On 17 October 1968, the Department of People's Welfare (Departemen Kesejateraan Rakyat) established National Family Planning Board (Lembaga Keluarga Berencana Nasional). In 1970, National Family Planning Board transformed into National Family Planning Coordinating Board (Badan Koordinasi Keluarga Berencana Nasional) which had great challenge into family planning.

In 1999, family planning was mandated to be decentralised. Some family planning responsibility was shared to provincial, city, and regency responsibilities. The decentralization started in 2004.

In 2009, National Family Planning Coordinating Board was transformed into National Population and Family Planning Board (Badan Kependudukan dan Keluarga Berencana Nasional). The transformation reflected in mission of creating a visionary development of the population and creating a prosperous small family. The responsibility was expanded from family planning only with population control.

On June 13, 2013, President Susilo Bambang Yudhoyono finally appointed the former Deputy Minister of Education and Culture, Prof. Fasli Jalal as Head of the National Population and Family Planning Board (BKKBN).

In 2024, President Prabowo Subianto in the Red and White Cabinet created a new ministry nomenclature with the name of the Indonesian Ministry of Population and Family Development. The incumbent minister will concurrently serve as Head of the National Population and Family Planning Agency. The first minister to serve during Prabowo's term was Wihaji.

=== Head of National Population and Family Planning Board ===
- Suwardjono Surjaningrat (1970–1983)
- Haryono Suyono (1983–1998)
- Ida Bagus Oka (1998–1999)
- Khofifah Indar Parawansa (1999–2001)
- Yaumil Agoes Achir (2001–2003)
- Sumarjati Arjoso (2003–2006)
- Sugiri Syarief (2006–2013)
- Fasli Jalal (2013–2015)
- Surya Chandra Surapaty (2015–2017)
- Sigit Priohutomo (2017–2019)
- Hasto Wardoyo (2019–2024)
- Sundoyo (plt.) (23 September-20 October 2024)
- Wihaji (21 October 2024 – present), concurrently serving as Minister of Population and Family Development

== Responsibility ==
The National Population and Family Planning Board is responsible for:

- population control
- family planning

== Organizational structure ==
The organizational structure of the Ministry consists of:

- Office of the Minister of Population and Family Development (concurrent post with Head of National Population and Family Planning Board)
- Office of the Deputy Minister of Population and Family Development (concurrent post with Deputy Head of National Population and Family Planning Board)
- Office of the Secretariat of the Ministry of Population and Family Development (concurrent post with Secretariat of the National Population and Family Planning Board)
- Board of Experts
  - Senior Expert to the Minister for Law, Institutions, and Bureaucratic Reform
  - Senior Expert to the Minister for Sustainable Population Development
  - Senior Expert to the Minister for Family Social Engineering

The organizational structure of the National Population and Family Planning Board (BKKBN) consists of:

- Office of the Head of National Population and Family Planning Board
- Office of the Deputy Head of National Population and Family Planning Board
- Office of the Secretariat of the National Population and Family Planning Board
  - Bureau of Planning and Finance
  - Bureau of Law, Organization, and Administration
  - Bureau of Public Relations and Information
  - Bureau of Human Resources
  - Bureau of General Affairs and State Properties
- Deputy for Family Development Strategy Policy, Population Control, and Family Planning (Deputy I)
  - Strategic Directorate for Policy Harmonization of Population Control
  - Strategic Directorate for Family Development and Family Planning
  - Strategic Directorate for Accessibility, Quality Development, and Family Services
  - Strategic Directorate for Human Resource Quality Development and Family Independence
- Deputy for Population Control (Deputy II)
  - Directorate of Population Control Planning
  - Directorate of Population Control Policies Integration
  - Directorate of Population Educational Management
  - Directorate of Population Effects Analysis
- Deputy for Family Planning and Reproductive Health (Deputy III)
  - Fostering Directorate for Planned Parenthood Services
  - Fostering Directorate for Planned Parenthood Quality
  - Fostering Directorate for Health Reproduction
  - Fostering Directorate for Planned Parenthood in Specially Designated Areas and Targeted Areas
- Deputy for Family Welfare and Family Empowerment (Deputy IV)
  - Fostering Directorate for Family Resilience, Toddlers Resilience, and Children Resilience
  - Fostering Directorate for Teenagers Resilience
  - Fostering Directorate for Elderly Resilience and Vulnerables
  - Fostering Directorate for Economic Empowerment
- Deputy for Community Mobilization and Participation (Deputy V)
  - Fostering Directorate for Field Mobilization
  - Fostering Directorate for Villagers and Urban Institutions
  - Fostering Directorate for Community Participation
  - Fostering Directorate for Mass Organization Empowerment
- Main Inspectorate
  - Inspectorate I
  - Inspectorate II
  - Inspectorate III
- Centers
  - Center for Human Resource Development for Population Affairs, Family Development, and Planned Parenthood
  - Center for Data, Technology, and Information
