= Yogyakarta City Regional House of Representatives =

Yogyakarta City Regional House of Representatives Dewan Perwakilan Rakyat Daerah Kota Yogyakarta
- 2024–2029 period
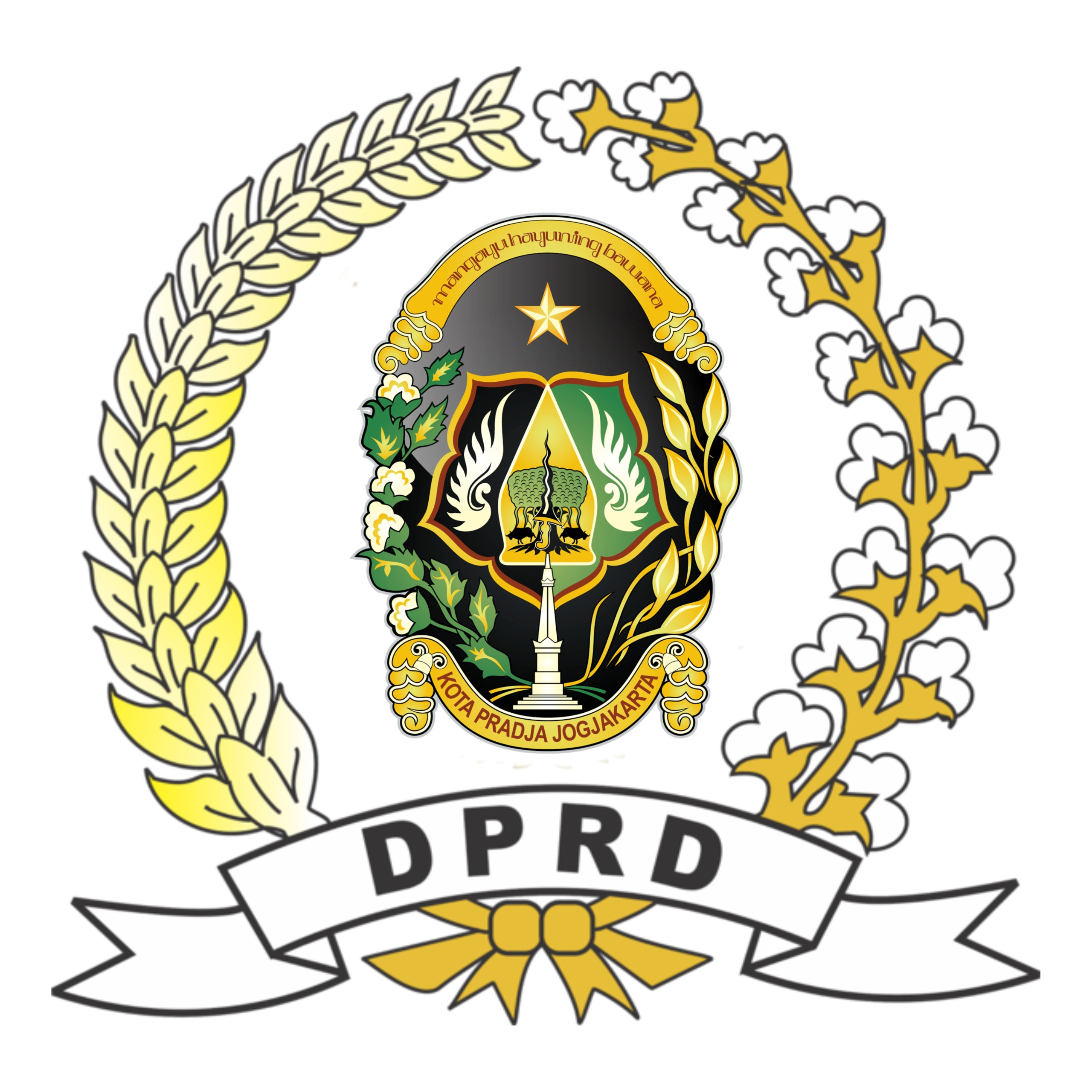

Type
- Type: Unicameral
- Term limits: 5 years

History
- New session started: 12 August 2024

Leadership
- Speaker: F. X. Wisnu Sabdono Putro, S.H., PDI-P since 28 October 2024
- 1st Vice Speaker: R. M. Sinarbiyatnujanat, S.E., Gerindra since 28 October 2024
- 2nd Vice Speaker: Triyono Hari Kuncoro, PKS since 28 October 2024

Structure
- Seats: 40
- Political groups: Government (11) PDI-P (11) Others (29) Gerindra (5) Golkar (5) PKS (5) NasDem (4) PAN (4) PPP (4) PKB (2)

Elections
- Voting system: Open list
- Last election: 14 February 2024

Meeting place
- Yogyakarta City Regional House of Representatives Building; Ipda Tut Harsono Street Number 43; Muja Muju, Umbulharjo, Yogyakarta; Special Region of Yogyakarta, Indonesia

Website
- dprd.jogjakota.go.id

The Yogyakarta City Regional House of Representatives (Indonesian: Dewan Perwakilan Rakyat Daerah Kota Yogyakarta, DPRD Kota Yogyakarta) is the unicameral municipal legislature of Yogyakarta, Special Region of Yogyakarta, Indonesia. It has 40 members, who are elected every five years, simultaneously with the national legislative election.

== Legal basis ==
The legislature for Yogyakarta was formed along with those of other cities in Special Region of Yogyakarta under Law Number 16 of 1950, which organized city governments within the province.

== General election results ==
=== 2024 Indonesian legislative election ===
The official valid votes received by political parties contesting the 2024 Indonesian legislative election in each electoral district (constituency) for members of the Yogyakarta City Regional House of Representatives are as follows.

2024 Indonesian legislative election results

Electoral district	PKB	Gerindra	PDI-P	Golkar	NasDem	Labour	Gelora	PKS	PKN	Hanura	Garuda	PAN	PBB	Democratic	PSI	Perindo	PPP	Ummat	Valid votes
Yogyakarta City 1	1,835	7,803	13,354	4,521	4,257	455	649	6,330	88	92	70	4,116	56	929	2,332	397	4,845	2,662	54,791
Yogyakarta City 2	1,015	5,656	10,696	5,460	3,484	355	107	4,805	18	60	57	2,370	40	558	2,375	706	3,652	2,206	43,620
Yogyakarta City 3	6,041	7,291	13,876	2,791	5,022	383	98	6,349	26	107	72	3,831	47	949	2,765	363	637	782	51,430
Yogyakarta City 4	1,480	5,825	10,609	4,084	2,551	400	192	4,811	19	65	53	3,402	35	606	2,226	264	1,634	595	38,851
Yogyakarta City 5	3,204	7,070	11,711	7,248	4,152	318	356	8,529	96	57	96	7,427	41	1,827	2,446	243	9,258	1,610	65,689
Total	13,575	33,645	60,246	24,104	19,466	1,911	1,402	30,824	247	381	348	21,146	219	4,869	12,144	1,973	20,026	7,855	254,381
Source: General Elections Commission of Indonesia

== Composition ==
The following is the composition of members of the Yogyakarta City Regional House of Representatives in the last four periods.

Party	Total seats			
Party	2009–2014	2014–2019	2019–2024	2024–2029
PKB seats	0	0	0	▲2
Gerindra seats	2	▲5	5	5
PDI-P seats	11	▲15	▼13	▼11
Golkar seats	5	5	▼4	▲5
NasDem seats		1	▲4	4
PKS seats	5	▼4	▲5	5
PAN seats	5	5	▲6	▼4
Demokrat seats	10	▼1	▲2	▼0
PPP seats	2	▲4	▼1	▲4
Total Seats	40	40	40	40
Total Party	7	▲8	8	8

== Electoral District ==
In the 2019 Legislative Election and the 2024 Legislative Election, the Yogyakarta City Regional House of Representatives election was divided into 5 electoral districts as follows:

Electoral District Name	Electoral District Area	Number of Seats
YOGYAKARTA CITY 1	Kraton, Mantrijeron, Mergangsan	9
YOGYAKARTA CITY 2	Gondomanan, Ngampilan, Pakualaman, Wirobrajan	7
YOGYAKARTA CITY 3	Gedongtengen, Jetis, Tegalrejo	8
YOGYAKARTA CITY 4	Danurejan, Gondokusuman	6
YOGYAKARTA CITY 5	Umbulharjo, Kotagede	10
TOTAL		40

== See also ==
- Yogyakarta
- Special Region of Yogyakarta
