= Takasaki University of Health and Welfare =

Coordinates: 36°19′28.9″N 139°3′17.5″E

- 高崎健康福祉大学
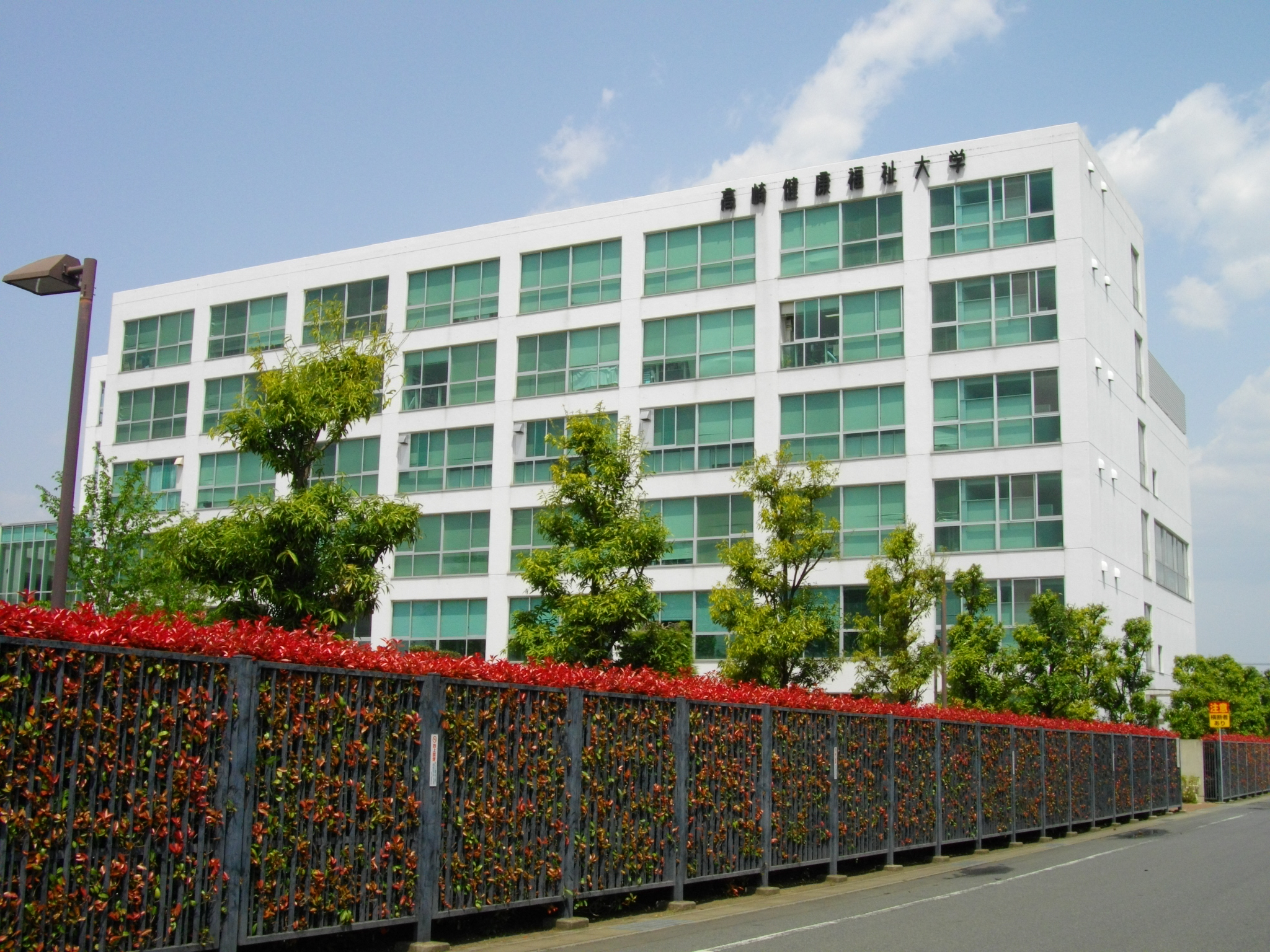
- Type: Private
- Established: Founded 1936; Chartered 2001
- Location: Takasaki, Gunma, Japan
- Website: Official website

Takasaki University of Health and Welfare (高崎健康福祉大学, Takasaki kenkō fukushi daigaku) is a private university in Takasaki, Gunma, Japan, established in 2001. The predecessor of the school was founded in 1936.

== International partnership ==
- College of Health Sciences Ahmad Yani Yogyakarta, (Indonesia)
