= Yogyakarta =

Capital and largest city of Special Region of Yogyakarta, Indonesia

Yogyakarta ꦔꦪꦺꦴꦒꦾꦏꦂꦠ Ngayogyakarta: Yogya; Jogjakarta; Jogja
- Special region capital
- City of Yogyakarta; Kota Yogyakarta
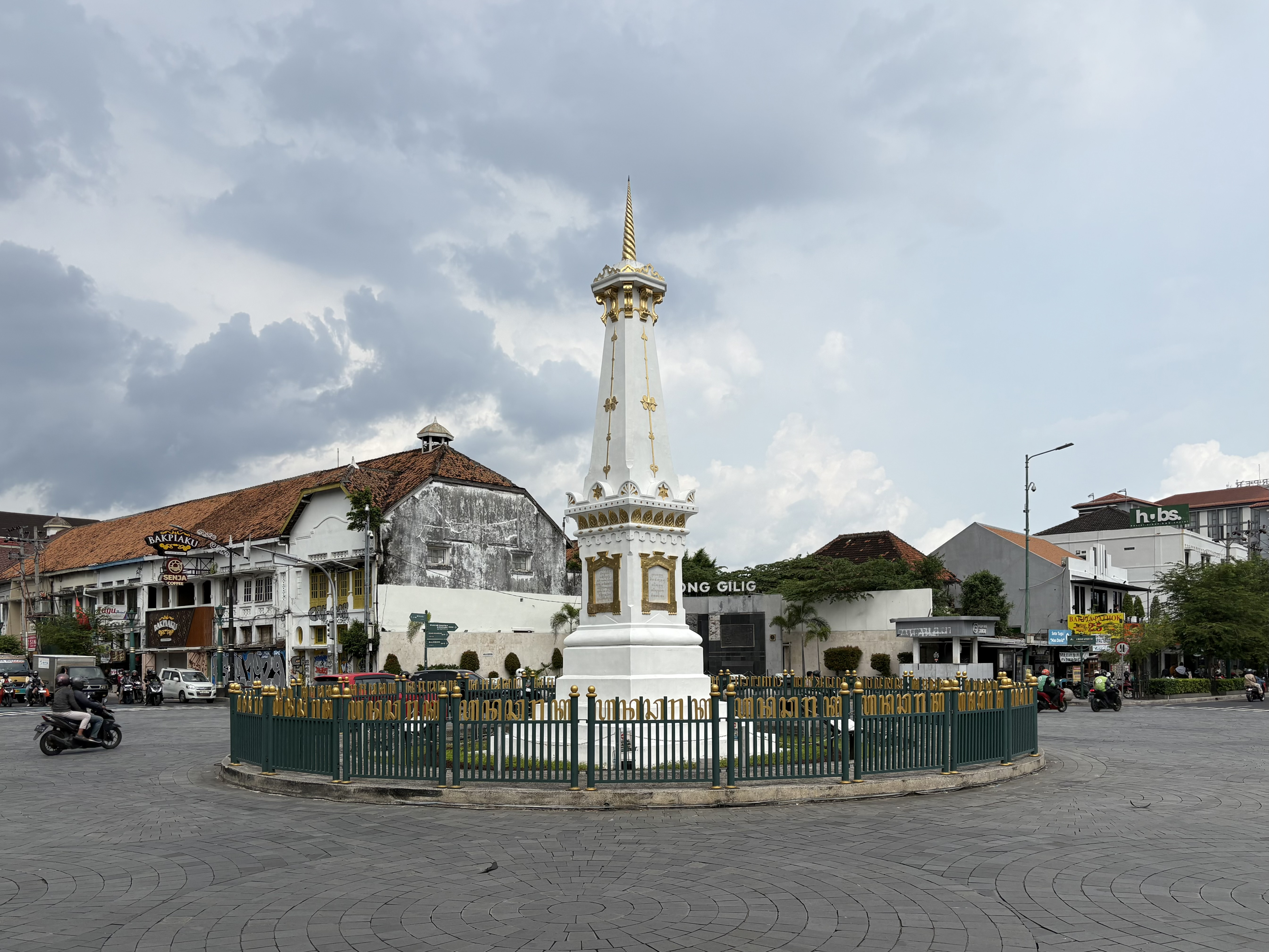
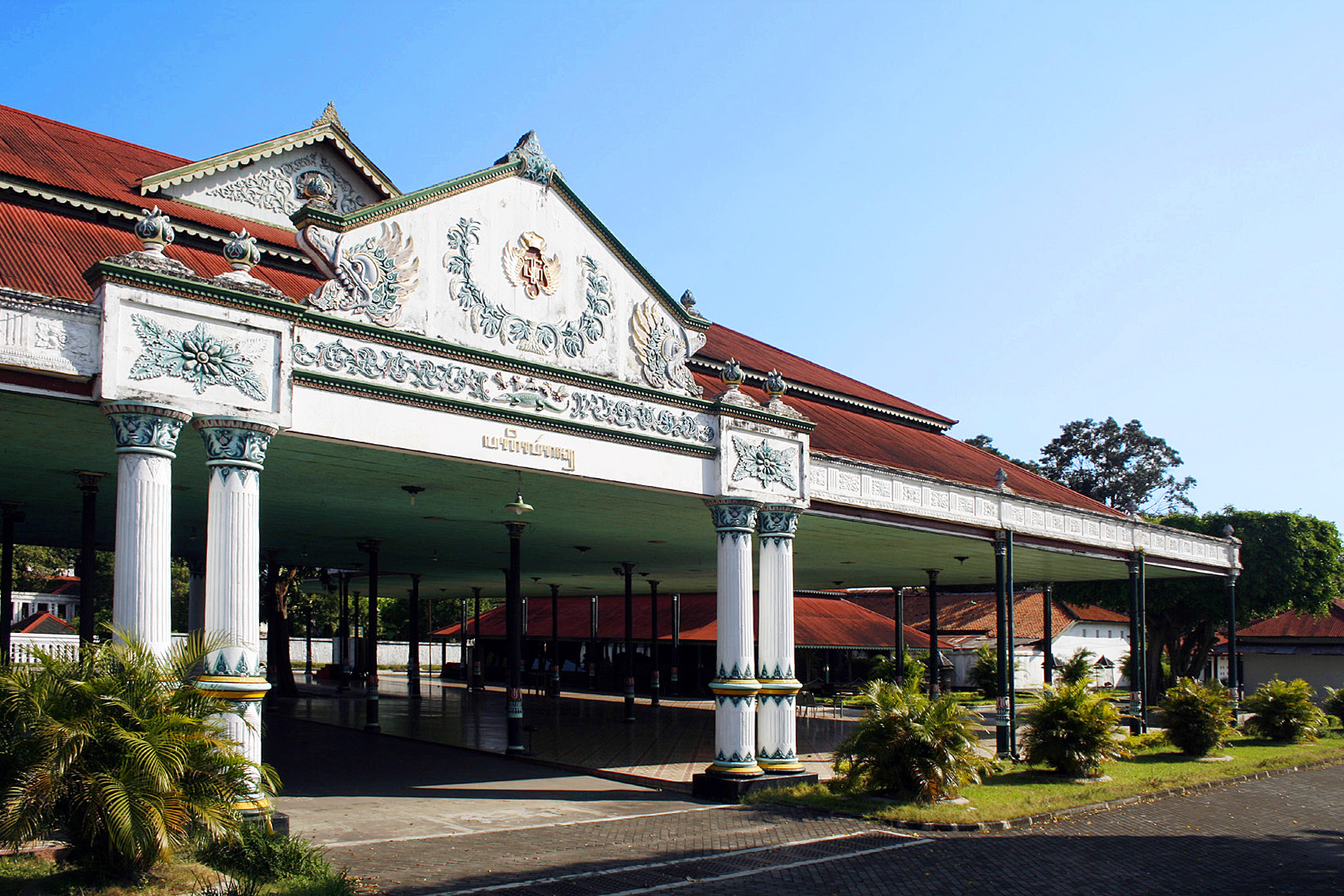
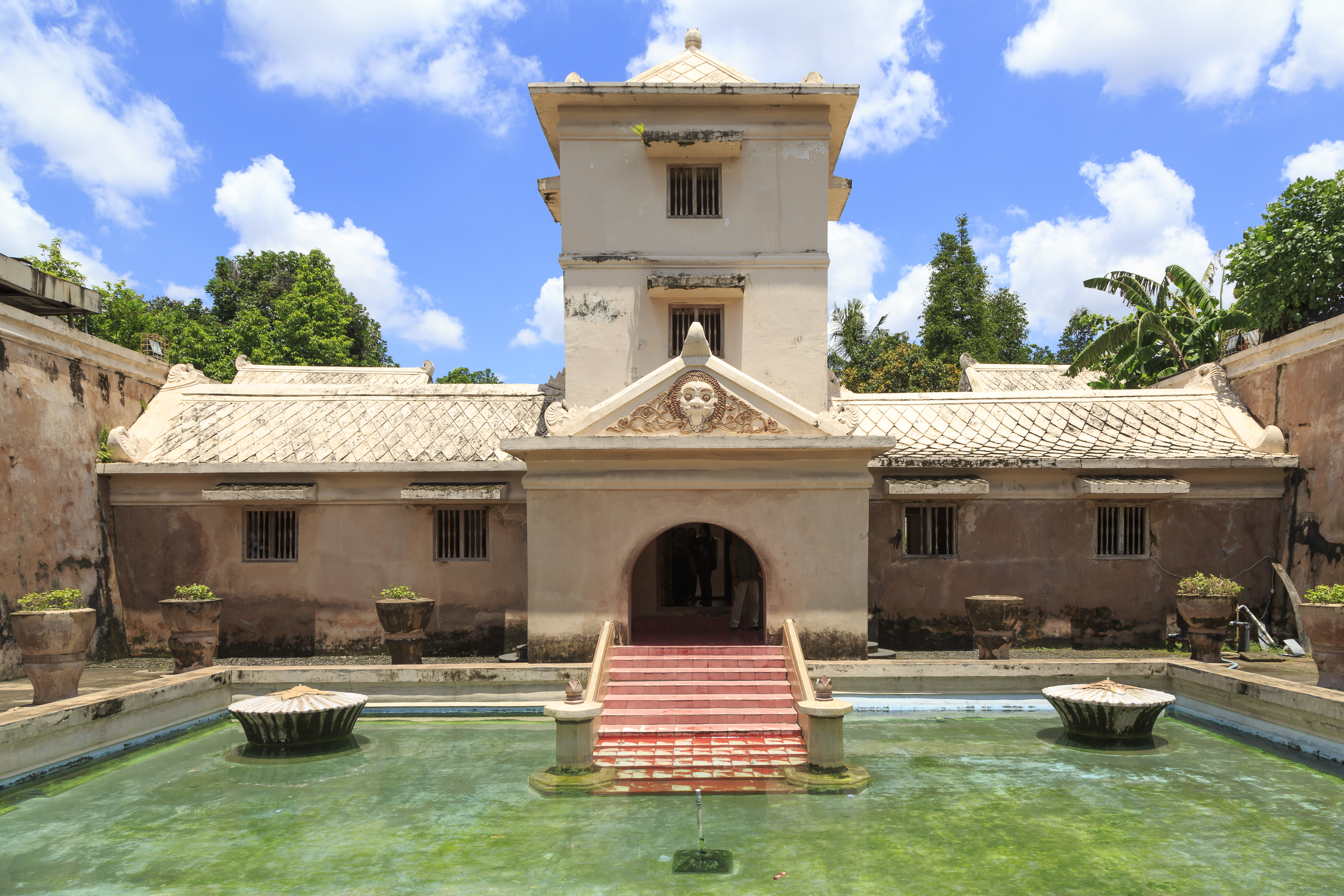
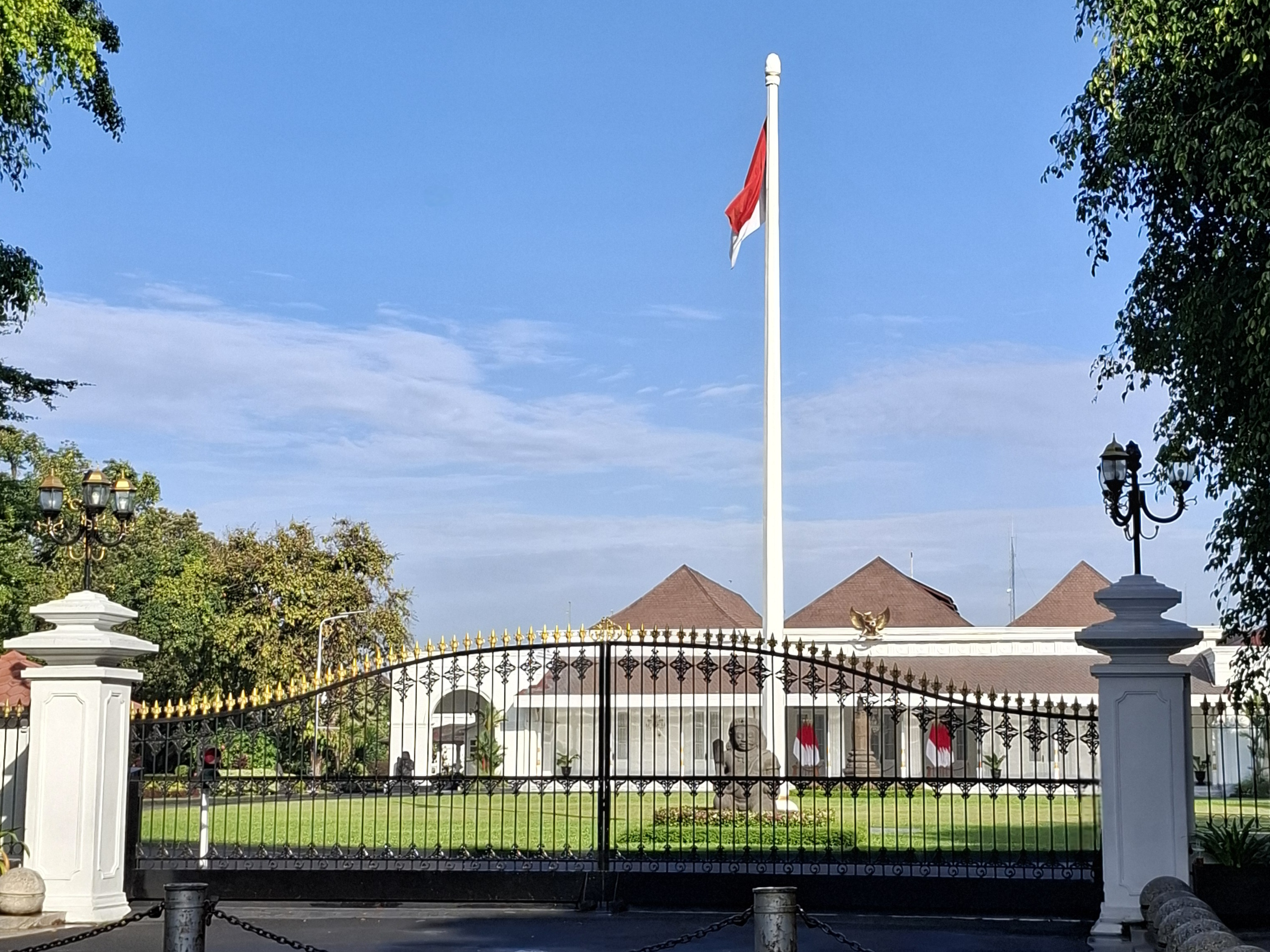
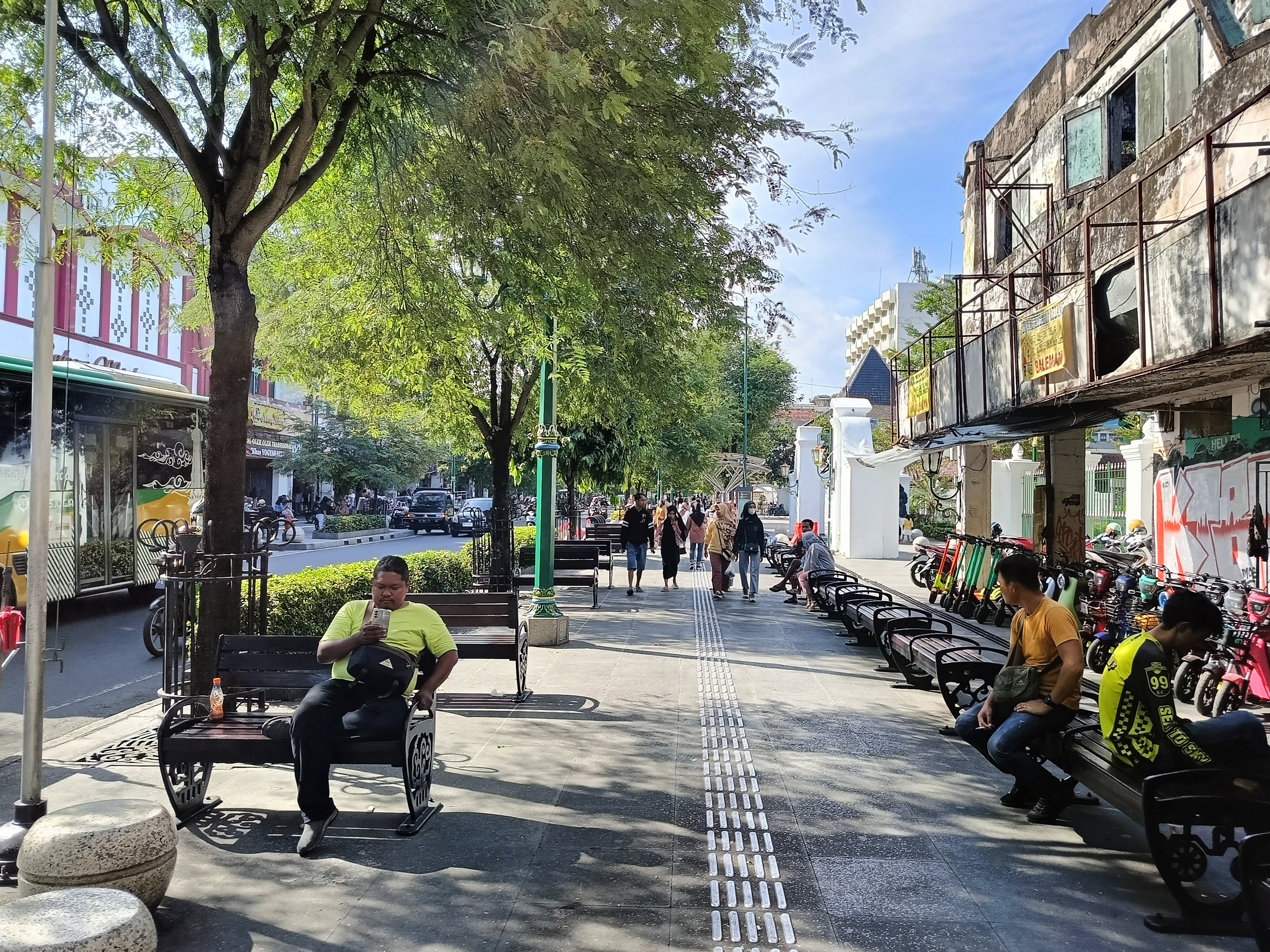
- Tugu Yogyakarta Royal Palace of Yogyakarta Taman Sari Water Castle Gedung Agung Malioboro Street

- Flag Seal
- Nicknames: Kota Pelajar (City of Students), Kota Budaya (Cultural City), Kota Gudeg (Gudeg City)
- Motto: ꦲꦩꦼꦩꦪꦸꦲꦪꦸꦤꦶꦁꦧꦮꦤ (Javanese); Hamemayu Hayuning Bawana "Beautify the Beauty of the World"
- Interactive map of Yogyakarta
- Location in Java and Indonesia Yogyakarta (Indonesia)
- Coordinates: 7°48′5″S 110°21′52″E
- Country: Indonesia
- Province: Special Region of Yogyakarta

Government
  - Mayor: Hasto Wardoyo (PDI-P)
  - Vice Mayor: Wawan Harmawan
  - Legislature: Yogyakarta City Regional House of Representatives (DPRD)

Area
  - Special region capital: 32.82 km^{2} (12.67 sq mi)
  - Metro: 2,159.1 km^{2} (833.6 sq mi)
- Elevation: 113 m (371 ft)

Population (mid 2023 estimate)
  - Special region capital: 375,699
  - Density: 11,450/km^{2} (29,650/sq mi)
  - Metro: 4,010,436
  - Metro density: 1,857.5/km^{2} (4,810.8/sq mi)

Nominal GDP (nominal, 2023)
  - Total: Rp 46.193 trillion US$ 3.031 billion
  - Per capita: Rp 122.951 million US$ 8,066
- Time zone: UTC+7 (Indonesia Western Time)
- Area code: (+62) 274
- Vehicle registration: AB
- HDI (2024): ▲0.887 (1st) very High
- Website: jogjakota.go.id

UNESCO World Heritage Site
- Official name: The Cosmological Axis of Yogyakarta and its Historic Landmarks
- Criteria: Cultural: (ii), (iii)
- Reference: 1671
- Inscription: 2023 (45th Session)
- Area: 42.22 ha (104.3 acres)
- Buffer zone: 291.17 ha (719.5 acres)

Yogyakarta (Note: English: /ˌjoʊɡjəˈkɑːrtə/ YOHG-yə-KAR-tə; Javanese: ꦔꦪꦺꦴꦒꦾꦏꦂꦠ Ngayogyakarta [ŋɑːˈjɔɡjɔˈkɑːrtɔ]; Petjo: Jogjakarta) is the capital city of the Special Region of Yogyakarta in Indonesia, in the south-central part of the island of Java. As the only Indonesian royal city still ruled by a monarchy, Yogyakarta is regarded as an important centre for classical Javanese fine arts and culture such as ballet, batik textiles, drama, literature, music, poetry, silversmithing, visual arts, and wayang puppetry. Renowned as a centre of Indonesian education, Yogyakarta is home to a large student population and dozens of schools and universities, including Gadjah Mada University, the country's largest institute of higher education and one of its most prestigious.

Yogyakarta is the capital of the Yogyakarta Sultanate and served as the Indonesian capital from 1946 to 1948 during the Indonesian National Revolution, with Gedung Agung as the president's office. One of the districts in southeastern Yogyakarta, Kota, was the capital of the Mataram Sultanate between 1587 and 1613.

The city's population was 388,627 at the 2010 census, and 373,589 at the 2020 census; the official estimate as of mid-2023 was 375,699, composed of 182,840 men and 192,859 women. The greater metropolitan area includes the city of Magelang and 65 districts across Sleman, Klaten, Bantul, Kulon Progo and Magelang regencies and was home to 4,010,436 inhabitants in 2010. Yogyakarta has the highest HDI (Human Development Index) of all Indonesian regencies and cities, with a score of 0.887.

== Etymology and orthography ==
Yogyakarta is named after the Indian city of Ayodhya, the birthplace of the eponymous hero Rama from the Ramayana epic. Yogya means "suitable; fit; proper", and karta means "prosperous; flourishing". Thus, Yogyakarta means "[a city that is] fit to prosper".

In colonial era correspondence, the city is often written in the Javanese script as ꦔꦪꦺꦴꦒꦾꦏꦂꦠ, read as /ŋajoɡjakarta/ with the added prefix nga-.

In the orthography of the time, the proper name was spelt with the Latin alphabet as "Jogjakarta". As the orthography of the Indonesian language changed, the consonant /j/ came to be written with ⟨y⟩, and the consonant /dʒ/ with ⟨j⟩. Personal and geographical names however, were allowed to maintain their original spelling according to contemporary Indonesian orthography. Thus, the city can be written as "Yogyakarta", which is true to its original pronunciation and the Javanese script spelling, or "Jogjakarta", which is true to the old Dutch spelling and reflects popular pronunciation today, but differs from the original Ayodhya etymology. One may encounter either "Yogyakarta" or "Jogjakarta" in contemporary documents.

== History ==
=== Mataram Kingdom (8th–10th century CE) ===
According to the Canggal inscription dated 732 CE, the area traditionally known as "Mataram" became the capital of the Medang Kingdom, identified as Mdang i Bhumi Mataram established by King Sanjaya of Mataram. The inscription was found in a Hindu temple in Central Java, 40 km away from Yogyakarta and 20 km away from the giant Borobudur temple complex. This Hindu temple itself was on the border between the area of the Hindu Sanjaya dynasty and the area of the Buddhist Shailendra dynasty.

Mataram became the centre of a refined and sophisticated Javanese Hindu-Buddhist culture for about three centuries in the heartland of the Progo River valley, on the southern slopes of Mount Merapi volcano. This time period witnessed the construction of numerous candi, including Borobudur and Prambanan.

Around the year 929 CE, the last ruler of the Sanjaya dynasty, King Mpu Sindok of Mataram, moved the seat of power of the Mataram Kingdom from Central Java to East Java and thus established the Isyana dynasty. The exact cause of the move is still uncertain; however, a severe eruption from Mount Merapi or a power struggle with the Sumatra-based Srivijaya kingdom probably caused the move.

Historians suggest that some time during the reign of King Wawa of Mataram (924–929 CE), Merapi erupted and devastated the kingdom's capital in Mataram.

=== Majapahit Empire (1293–1527) ===
During the Majapahit era, the area surrounding modern Yogyakarta was identified again as "Mataram" and recognised as one of the twelve Majapahit provinces in Java ruled by Bhre Mataram. During the reign of the fourth king of the Majapahit Empire, the Hindu Hayam Wuruk (1350–1389) of the Rajasa dynasty, the title of Bhre Mataram was held by the king's nephew and son-in-law Wikramawardhana, later the fifth king of Majapahit.

=== Mataram Sultanate (1587–1755) ===
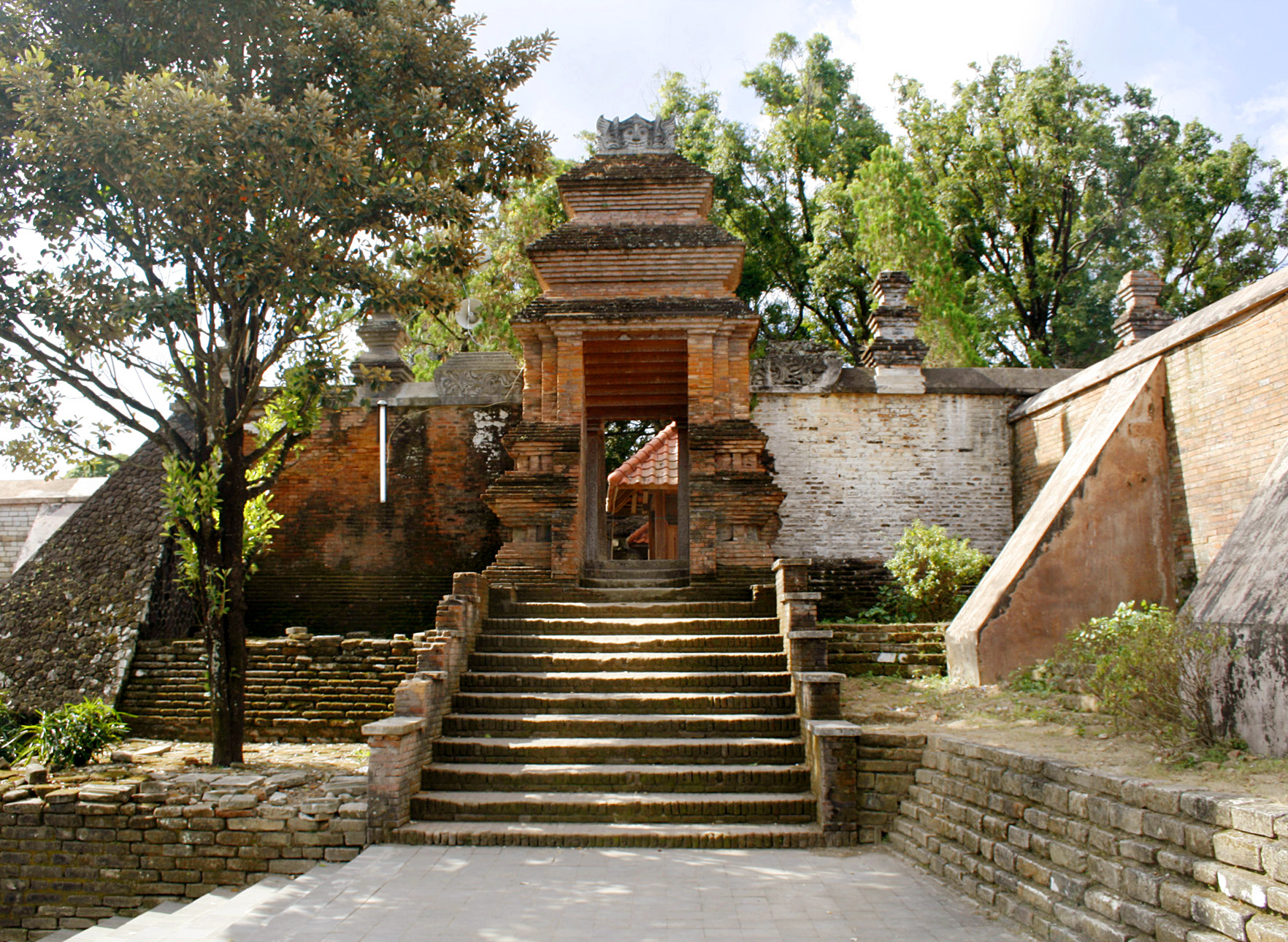
Kotagede, former capital of the Mataram Sultanate

Kotagede, now a district in southeastern Yogyakarta, was established as the capital of the Mataram Sultanate from 1587 to 1613.

During the reign of Sultan Agung Hanyokrokusumo (1613–1645), the Mataram Sultanate reached its zenith as the greatest kingdom in Java, and expanded its influence to Central Java, East Java, and half of West Java. After two changes of capital—to Karta and then to Plered, both located in present-day Bantul Regency—the capital of the Mataram Sultanate finally moved to Kartasura.

=== Yogyakarta secedes and European invasions (1745–1830) ===
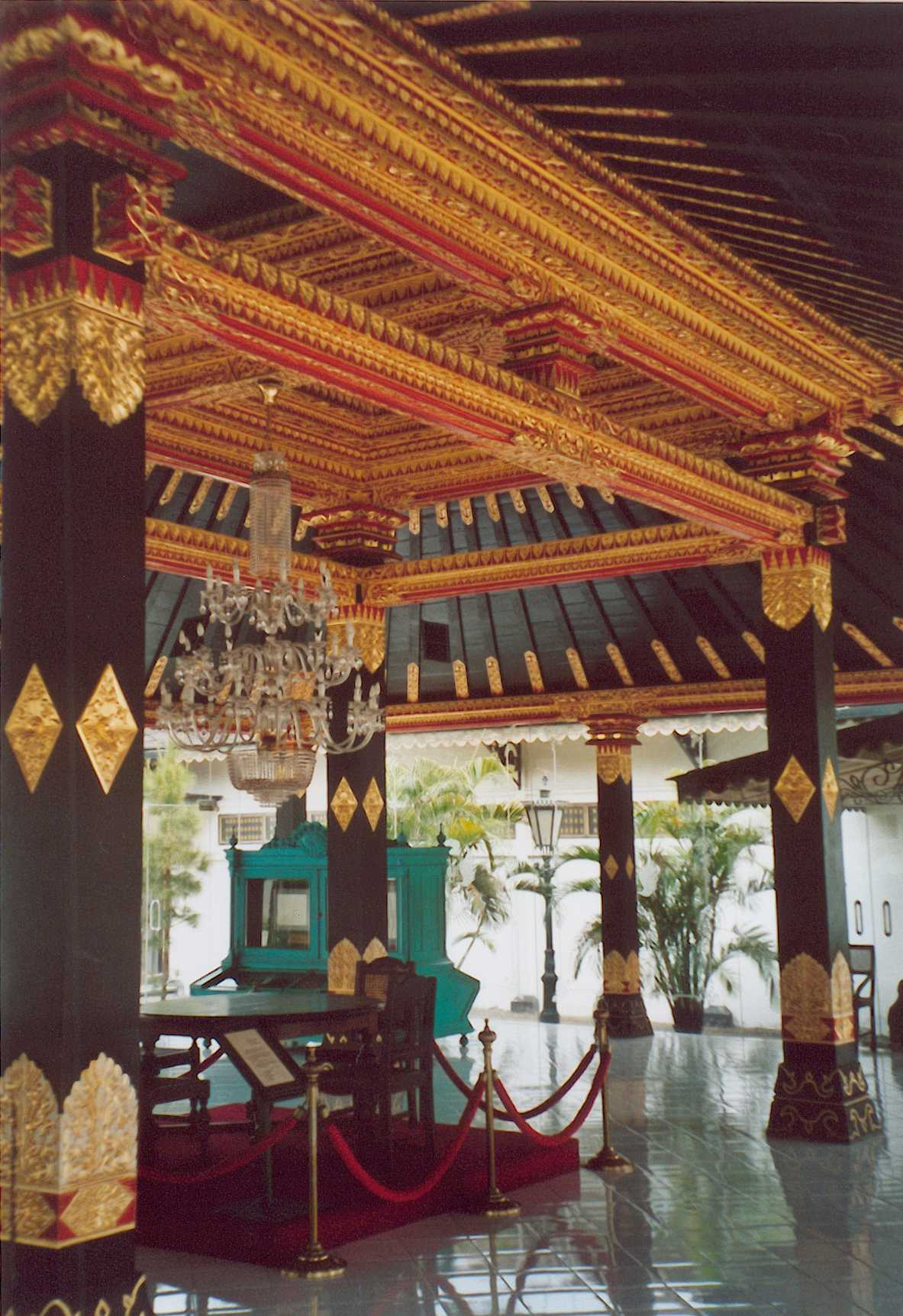
The pavilion of the Museum of Sultan Hamengkubuwana IX, located in the main side of Yogyakarta Royal Palace

The Taman Sari Water Castle, the former royal garden of the Sultan of Yogyakarta

A civil war in the Mataram Sultanate broke out between Pakubuwono II (1745–1749), the last ruler of Kartasura, and his younger brother and heir apparent to the throne, Prince Mangkubumi (later known as Hamengkubuwono I, the first Sultan of Yogyakarta, and the founder of the current ruling royal house). Pakubuwono II had agreed to cooperate with the Dutch East India Company, and ceded some Mataram territory to the Dutch. Prince Mangkubumi, stood against the agreement, citing concerns that the people would become slaves under Dutch rule. During the war, Prince Mangkubumi defeated Pakubuwono II's forces and declared sovereignty in the Sultanate of Yogyakarta, occupying the southern parts of the former Mataram Sultanate.

With Pakubowono II dead from illness, the Yogyakarta Sultanate was established as a result of the Treaty of Giyanti (Perjanjian Gianti), signed and ratified on 13 February 1755 among Prince Mangkubumi, the Dutch East India Company, and his nephew Pakubuwono III and his allies. Ascending to the newly created Yogyakarta throne with the name Sultan Hamengkubuwono I, Mangkubumi thus established the royal House of Hamengkubuwono, still the ruling house of Yogyakarta today. Sultan Hamengkubuwono I and his family officially moved into the Palace of Yogyakarta, still the seat of the reigning sultan, on 7 October 1756. These events consequently marked the end of the Mataram Sultanate, resulting in the births of the rival Yogyakarta Sultanate and the Surakarta Sunanate.

During the brief period of British rule over Java in 1811, rumours of plans by the Yogyakarta court to launch an attack against the British led to uneasiness among the Britons stationed in Java. On 20 June 1812, Sir Stamford Raffles led a 1,200-strong British force to capture the Yogyakarta kraton. The Yogyakarta forces, surprised by the attack, were easily defeated; the kraton fell in one day, and was subsequently sacked and burnt.

The attack on the kraton was the first of its kind in Indonesian history, leaving the Yogyakarta court humiliated. The sultanate found itself involved in conflict again during the Java War.

=== Republic of Indonesia era (1945–present) ===
In 1942, the Japanese Empire invaded the Dutch East Indies and ruled Java until they were defeated in 1945. Sukarno proclaimed the independence of the Indonesian Republic on 17 August 1945; Sultan Hamengkubuwono IX promptly sent a letter to Sukarno, expressing his support for the newly born nation of Indonesia and acknowledging the Yogyakarta Sultanate as part of the Indonesian Republic.

The Sultanate of Surakarta did the same, and both of the Javanese kingdoms were accordingly awarded privileged statuses as "Special Regions" within the Indonesian Republic. However, because of a leftist anti-royalist uprising in Surakarta, the Sunanate of Surakarta lost its special administrative status in 1946 and was absorbed into Central Java Province.

Yogyakarta's support was essential in the Indonesian struggle for independence during the Indonesian National Revolution (1945–1949). The city of Yogyakarta became the capital of the Indonesian Republic from 1946 to 1948, after the fall of Jakarta to the Dutch. Later the Dutch also invaded Yogyakarta, causing the Republic's capital to be transferred once again, to Bukittinggi in West Sumatra on 19 December 1948. The General Offensive of 1 March 1949 resulted in an Indonesian political and strategic victory against the Dutch and the withdrawal of Dutch forces from Yogyakarta. On 29 June 1949 Yogyakarta was completely cleared of Dutch forces, under pressure from the United Nations.

For its significant contribution to the survival of the Indonesian Republic, Yogyakarta was given autonomy as a "special district".

== Geography ==
The area of the city of Yogyakarta is 32.82 square kilometres (12.7 square miles). While the city spreads in all directions from the Kraton, the Sultan's palace, the core of the modern city is to the north, centred around Dutch colonial-era buildings and the commercial district. Jalan Malioboro, with rows of pavement vendors and nearby markets and malls, is the primary shopping street for tourists in the city, while Jalan Solo, further north and east, is the shopping district more frequented by locals. The large local market of Beringharjo and the restored Dutch fort of Vredeburg are on the eastern part of the southern end of Malioboro.

Surrounding the Kraton is a densely populated residential neighbourhood that occupies land that was formerly the Sultan's sole domain. Evidence of this former use remains in the form of old walls, scattered throughout the city, and the ruins of the Taman Sari water castle, built in 1758 as a pleasure garden. No longer in use by the Sultan, the garden was largely abandoned before being used for housing by palace employees and descendants. Reconstruction efforts began in 2004, and the site is now a popular tourist attraction.

Nearby to the city of Yogyakarta is Mount Merapi, with the northern outskirts of the city running up to the southern slopes of the mountain in Sleman Regency. Mount Merapi (literally "mountain of fire" in both Indonesian and Javanese), is an active stratovolcano located on the border between Central Java and Yogyakarta. It is the most active volcano in Indonesia and has erupted regularly since 1548, with the last eruption occurring in January 2024.

=== Climate ===
Yogyakarta features a tropical monsoon climate (Köppen: Am) as the precipitation in the driest months between June and September are below 100 millimetres (3.9 inches). The wettest month in Yogyakarta is January with precipitation totalling 392 millimetres (15.4 inches). The climate is influenced by the monsoon. The annual temperature is roughly about 26 to 27 Celsius. The hottest month is April with average temperature 27.1 Celsius.

Climate data for Yogyakarta, Indonesia (elevation 121 m or 397 ft)
Month	Jan	Feb	Mar	Apr	May	Jun	Jul	Aug	Sep	Oct	Nov	Dec	Year
Mean daily maximum °C (°F)	29.8 (85.6)	30.5 (86.9)	31.3 (88.3)	31.5 (88.7)	31.1 (88.0)	31.0 (87.8)	30.3 (86.5)	30.7 (87.3)	31.5 (88.7)	31.6 (88.9)	30.9 (87.6)	30.1 (86.2)	30.9 (87.5)
Daily mean °C (°F)	26.3 (79.3)	26.5 (79.7)	26.6 (79.9)	27.1 (80.8)	26.9 (80.4)	26.2 (79.2)	25.4 (77.7)	25.6 (78.1)	26.4 (79.5)	27.0 (80.6)	26.8 (80.2)	26.4 (79.5)	26.4 (79.6)
Mean daily minimum °C (°F)	22.9 (73.2)	22.8 (73.0)	22.9 (73.2)	23.0 (73.4)	22.7 (72.9)	21.5 (70.7)	20.6 (69.1)	20.6 (69.1)	21.7 (71.1)	22.7 (72.9)	23.0 (73.4)	22.8 (73.0)	22.3 (72.1)
Average precipitation mm (inches)	392 (15.4)	299 (11.8)	363 (14.3)	149 (5.9)	141 (5.6)	68 (2.7)	29 (1.1)	16 (0.6)	49 (1.9)	136 (5.4)	237 (9.3)	278 (10.9)	2,157 (84.9)
Average relative humidity (%)	82	82	81	78	77	74	74	71	69	73	77	82	77
Source 1: Climate-Data.org (temp and precip)
Source 2: Weatherbase (temp records & humidity)

== Administrative districts ==
Administration of Yogyakarta City

The city of Yogyakarta is an administrative part of the Yogyakarta Special Region which has the status of a province in Indonesia. In 2020, Yogyakarta City held the highest population density in Greater Yogyakarta, with 11,546 people per square kilometre, Sleman and Bantul Regencies holding the second place with a population density of 1,958.5 people/sq kilometre, and third place with 1,940 people/sq kilometre respectively. Within the Greater Yogyakarta area lies Yogyakarta city.

Yogyakarta is divided into fourteen district-level subdivisions called kemantren (Javanese: ꦏꦼꦩꦤ꧀ꦠꦿꦺꦤ꧀), which makes Yogyakarta the only city in Indonesia to have such a designation, as it applied only within the Special Region of Yogyakarta. Below is a list of the kemantrens with their areas and their populations as at the 2010 Census and the 2020 Census, together with the official estimates as at mid 2023. The table also includes the locations of the district administrative centres, the number of administrative villages within each district, and its post codes.

Kode Wilayah	Name of District (kemantren)	Area in km^{2}	Pop'n Census 2010	Pop'n Census 2020	Pop'n Estimate mid 2023	Admin centre	No. of villages	Post codes
34.71.08	Mantrijeron ꦩꦤ꧀ꦠꦿꦶꦗꦼꦫꦺꦴꦤ꧀	2.67	31,267	33,340	33,664	Suryodiningratan	3	55141 - 55143
34.71.09	Kraton ꦏꦿꦠꦺꦴꦤ꧀	1.38	17,471	17,943	18,024	Kadipaten	3	55131 - 55133
34.71.12	Mergangsan ꦩꦼꦂꦒꦁꦱꦤ꧀	2.30	29,292	28,739	28,869	Brontokusuman	3	55151 - 55153
34.71.13	Umbulharjo ꦈꦩ꧀ꦧꦸꦭ꧀ꦲꦂꦗ	8.33	76,743	68,170	68,479	Warungboto	7	55161 - 55167
34.71.14	Kotagede ꦏꦸꦛꦒꦼꦝꦺ	2.99	31,152	33,280	33,557	Prenggan	3	55171 - 55173
34.71.03	Gondokusuman ꦒꦤ꧀ꦢꦏꦸꦱꦸꦩꦤ꧀	3.99	45,293	36,921	37,088	Demangan	5	55221 - 51225
34.71.04	Danurejan ꦢꦤꦸꦸꦉꦗꦤ꧀	1.11	18,342	18,670	18,851	Bausasran	3	55211 - 55213
34.71.11	Pakualaman ꦥꦏꦸꦮꦭꦩ꧀ꦩꦤ꧀	0.65	9,316	9,148	9,189	Gunungketur	2	55111 - 55112
34.71.10	Gondomanan ꦒꦤ꧀ꦢꦩꦤꦤ꧀	1.14	13,029	12,793	12,851	Prawirodirjanpectr	2	55121 - 55122
34.71.06	Ngampilan ꦔꦩ꧀ꦥꦶꦭ꧀ꦭꦤ꧀	0.84	16,320	15,358	15,428	Notoprajan	2	55261 - 55262
34.71.07	Wirobrajan ꦮꦶꦫꦧꦿꦗꦤ꧀	1.77	24,840	24,739	24,851	Patangpuluhan	3	55251 - 55253
34.71.05	Gedongtengen ꦒꦼꦝꦺꦴꦁꦠꦼꦔꦼꦤ꧀	0.99	17,185	16,484	16,559	Pringgokusuman	2	55271 - 55272
34.71.02	Jetis ꦗꦼꦛꦶꦱ꧀	1.72	23,454	23,385	23,491	Bumijo	3	55231 - 55233
34.71.01	Tegalrejo ꦠꦼꦒꦭ꧀ꦉꦗ	2.96	34,923	34,619	34,798	Tagalrejo	4	55241 - 55244
	Totals	32.82	388,627	373,589	375,699		45	

== Economy ==
In 2017, the Gross Domestic Regional Product (GRDP) of Yogyakarta at current prices was 31.31 trillion rupiahs (around US$2.2 billion). The tertiary sector contributed an important share (around 78% of GDP). the tertiary sector included wholesale and retail trade; repair of cars and motorcycles, transportation and warehousing; provision of accommodation and eating and drinking; information and communication; financial services and insurance; real estate; corporate services; government administration, defence and compulsory social security; educational services; health services and social activities as well as other services. In 2017, economic growth of Yogyakarta reached 5.24 percent slightly faster compared to 2016, which the growth reached 5.11 percent.

The minimum wage for Yogyakarta is Rp 2.827.593 as of 2026.The standard minimum wage of Rp 2.417.495 for the entire province ranks them of having one of the lowest minimum wage of all Indonesian provinces.

A plan for the 2nd phase of Indonesian high speed train is currently being developed from Bandung to Yogyakarta and Surabaya. This proposal would connect to other high-speed rail in Indonesia. The plan is still under development as of 2025.

There is a ongoing trade in live fruit bats (Pteropus, Cynopterus) in the Yogyakarta area. Research led by EcoVerde Global Consulting showed ongoing trade in the animal markets with higher numbers per capita in economically less affluent areas and higher numbers in cities with larger Christian populations

== Demographics ==
=== Religion ===
Religion in Yogyakarta
1. Islam (83.8%)
2. Christianity (15.8%)
3. Buddhism (0.25%)
4. Hinduism (0.12%)
5. Confucianism (0.01%)

Islam is the majority religion in the city of Yogyakarta, adhered to by 83.81% of the population, with a small number of Christians at 15.8%. A others minority of the population follows Buddhism, Hinduism, and Confucianism.

Since its founding, Yogyakarta has been a multicultural city inhabited by various ethnicities and religions. Several places of worship have existed for a long time, such as Kauman Great Mosque, Syuhada Mosque, Kotagede Mosque, HKBP Church, Kotabaru Catholic Church, Tjen Ling Kiong Temple, and Fuk Ling Miau Temple.

Yogyakarta is also the birthplace of one of Indonesia's largest Islamic organizations, Muhammadiyah, founded by K.H. Ahmad Dahlan in 1912 in Kauman, Ngupasan, Gondomanan, Yogyakarta. To this day, the Central Board of Muhammadiyah is still headquartered in Yogyakarta.

In 2018, the governor of the Special Region of Yogyakarta, Hamengkubuwono X, called for religious freedoms to be preserved after a terrorist attack against churches and public buildings in Surabaya the same year.

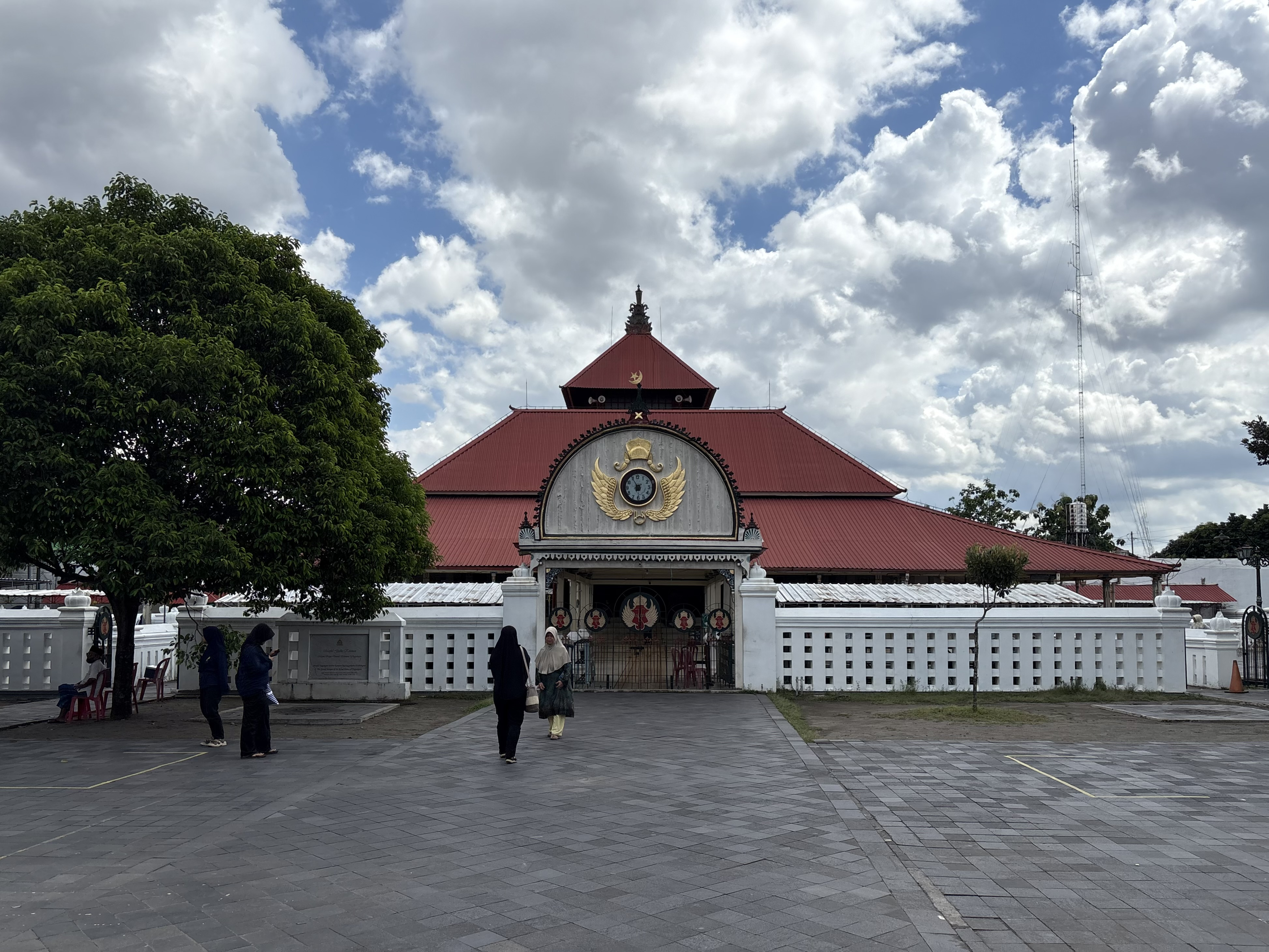
Kauman Great Mosque

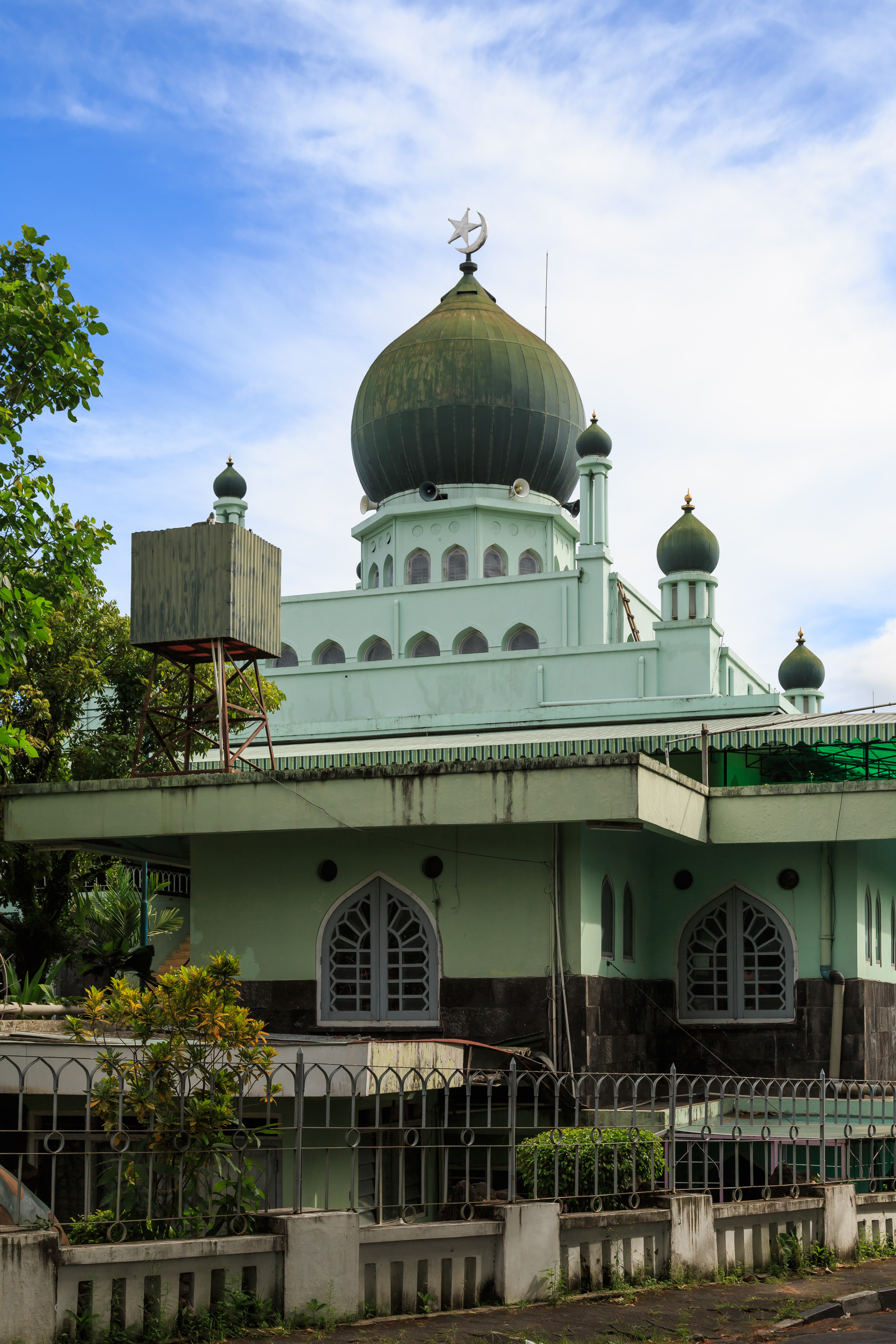
Syuhada Mosque

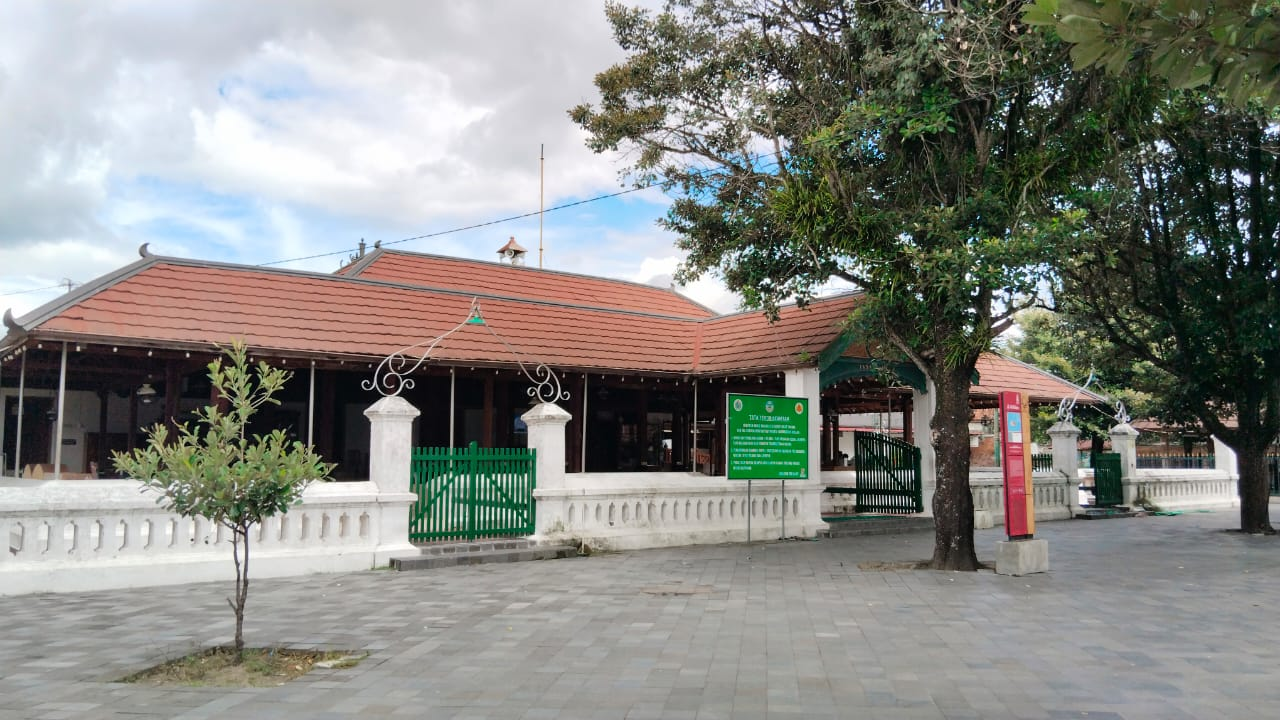
Kotagede Mosque

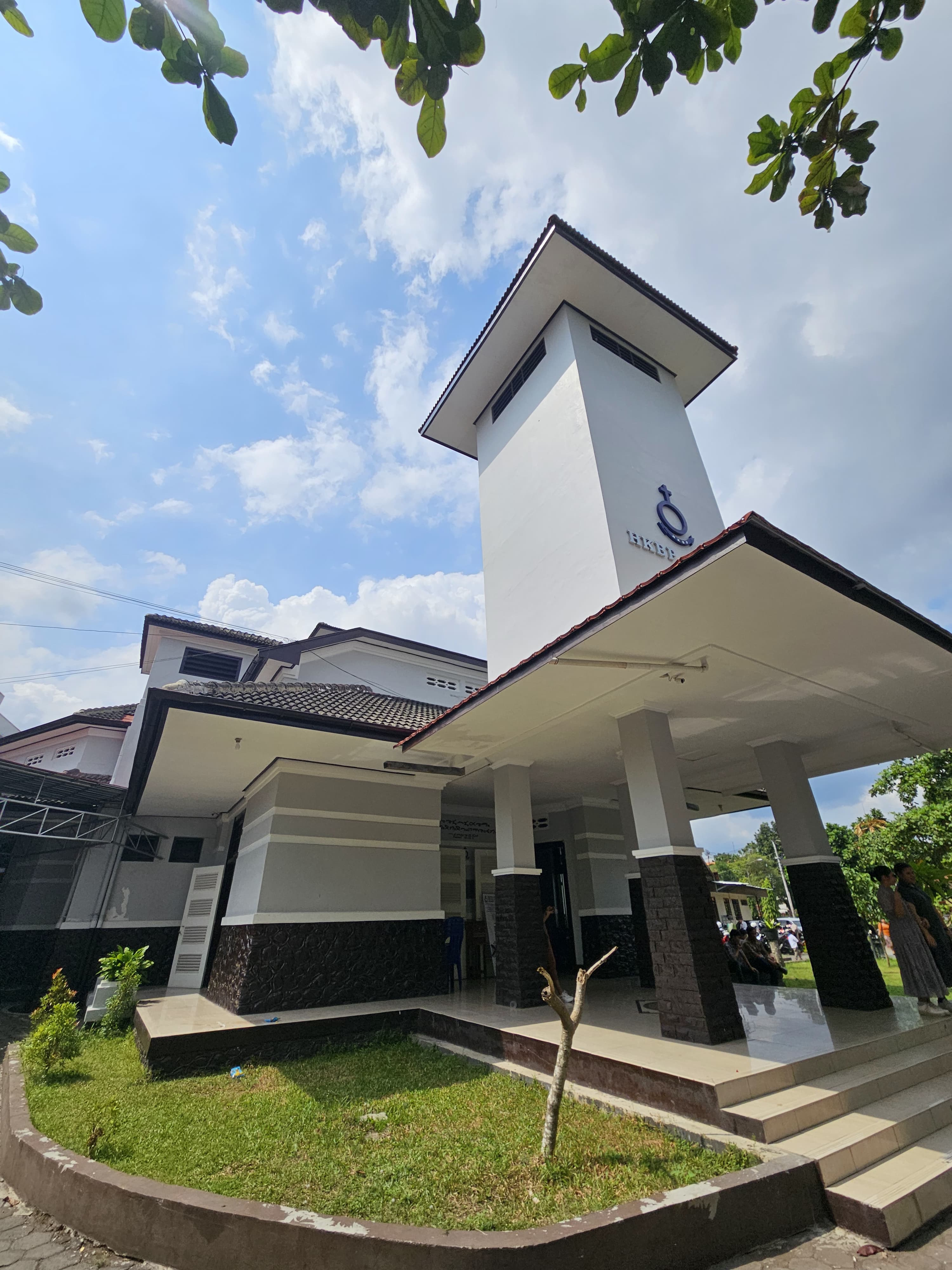
HKBP Church

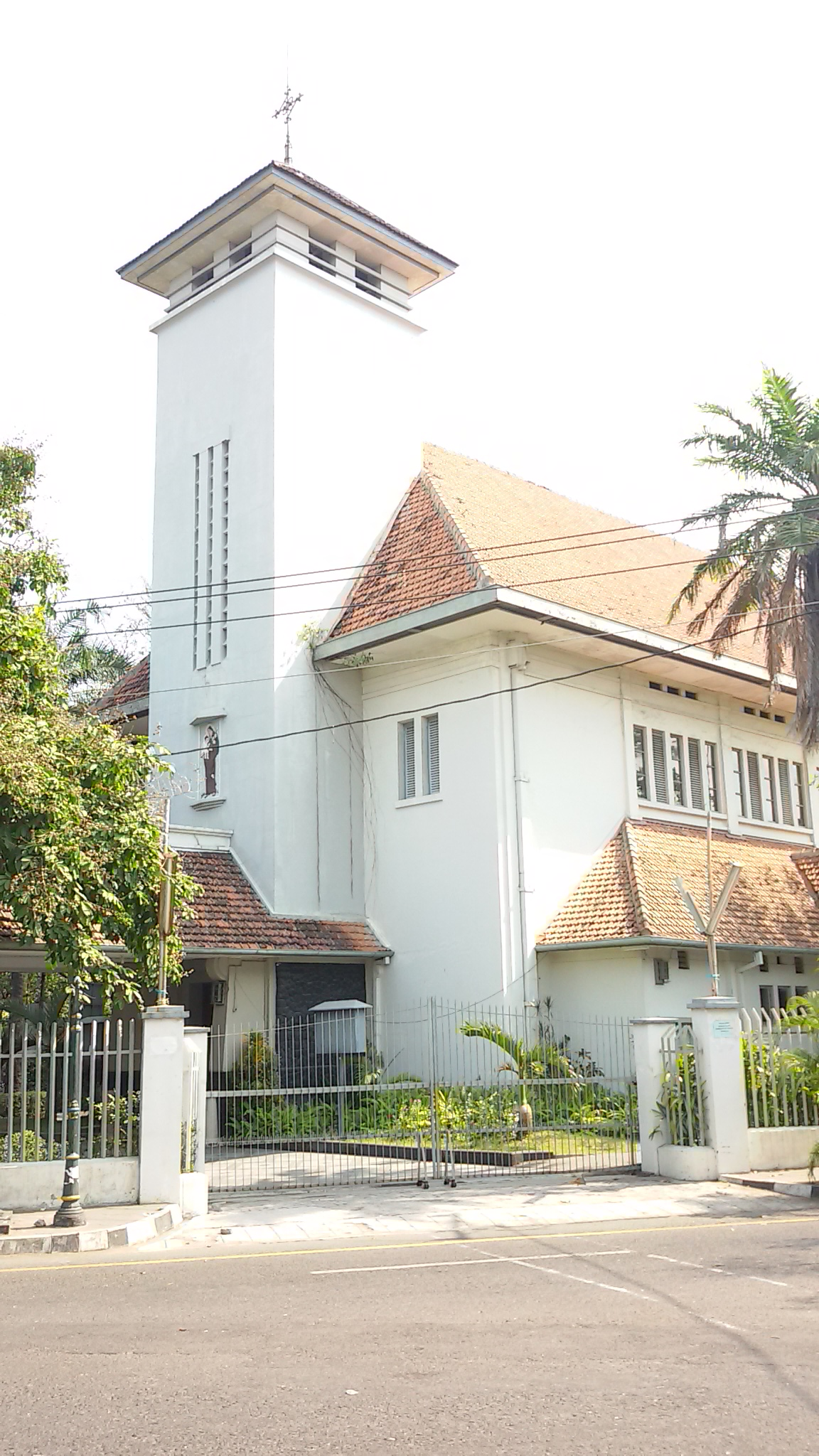
St. Anthony Catholic Church (Kotabaru Church)

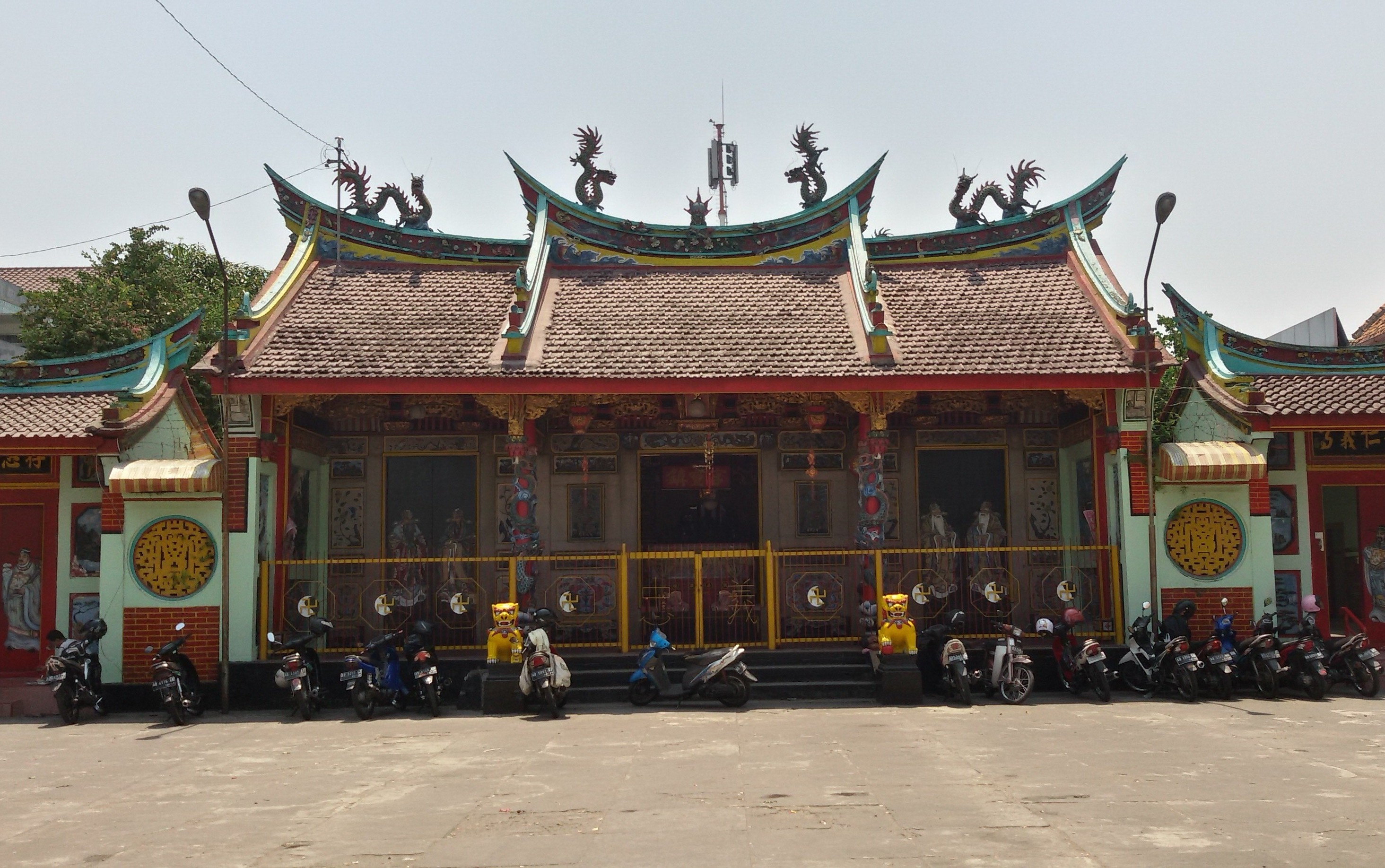
Tjen Ling Kiong Temple

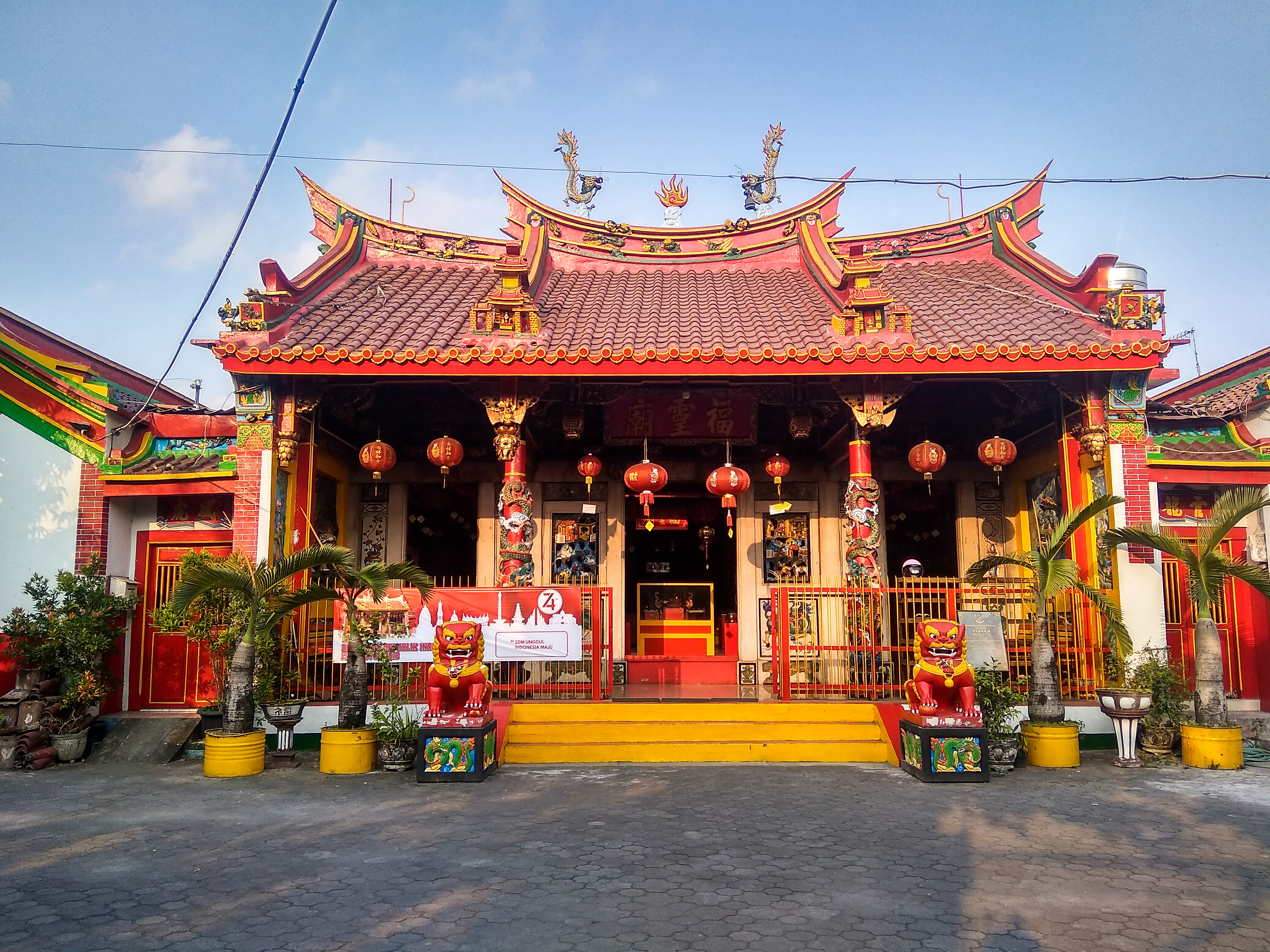
Fu Ling Miau Temple

== Tourism ==
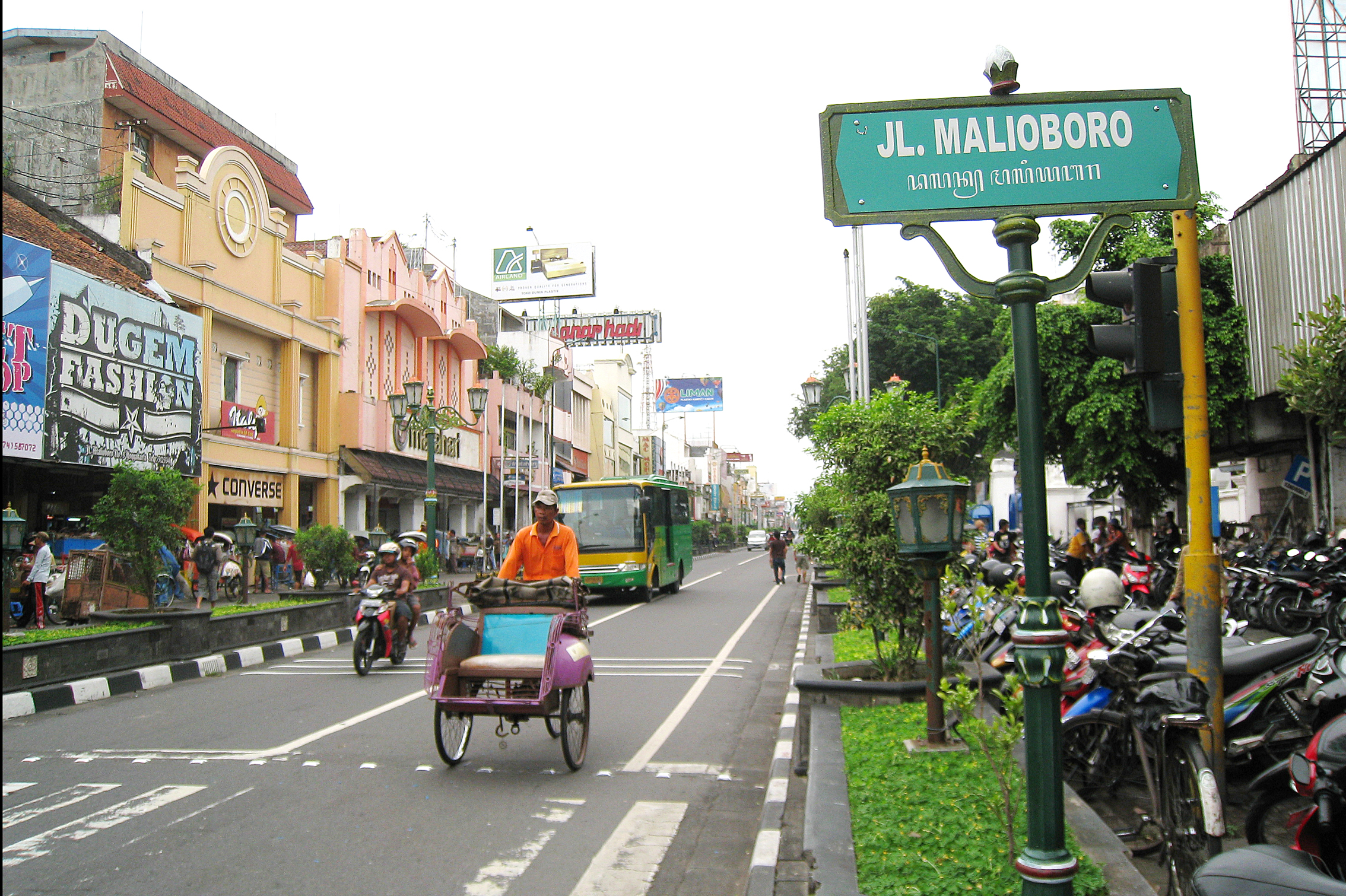
Malioboro street, the main street of Yogyakarta, lined with batik and handicrafts stores on both sides.

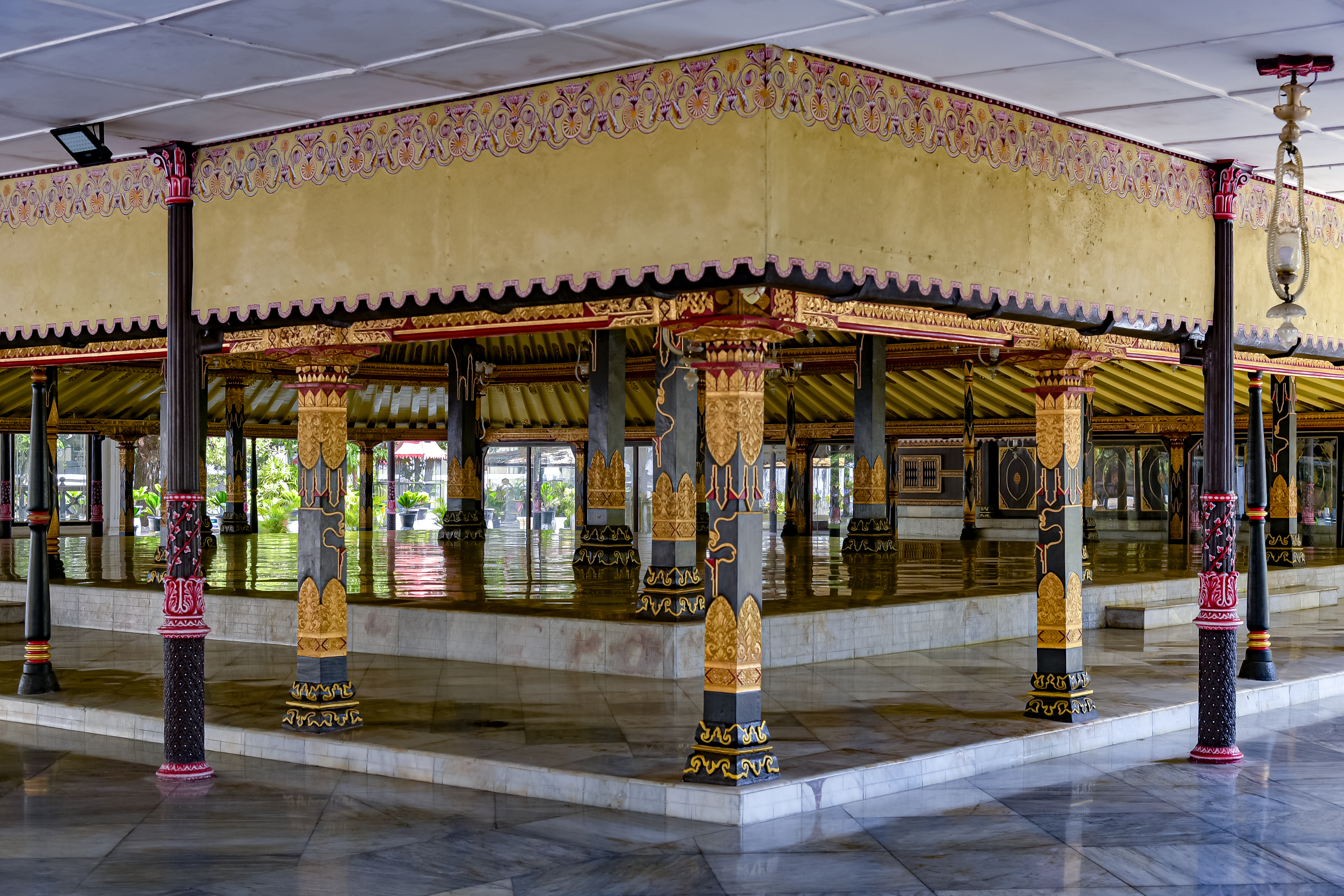
Kraton Ngayogyakarta Hadiningrat

Malioboro street is a popular shopping and culinary area within the city, which has pedestrian zone. Yogyakarta Kraton is the palace and seat of the reigning Sultan of Yogyakarta also located in the city.

== Sport ==
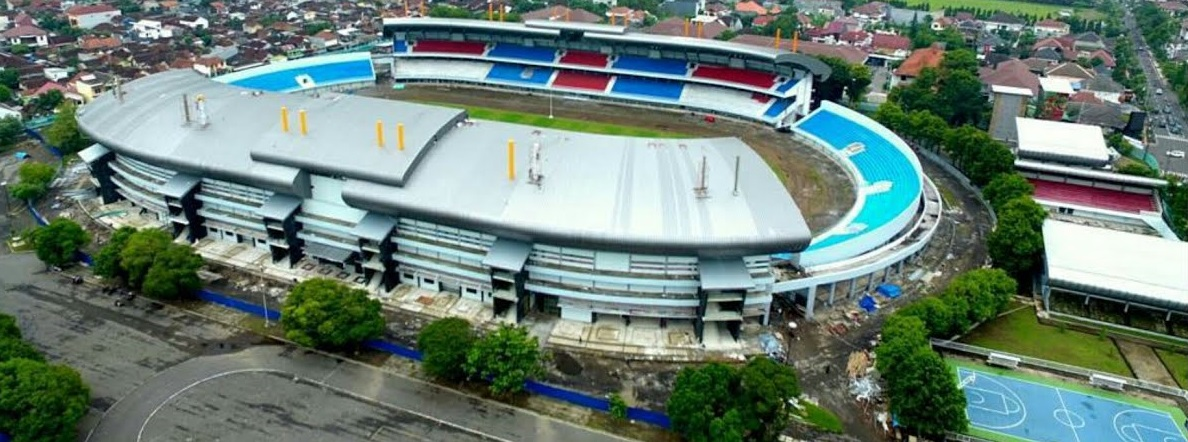
Mandala Krida Stadium

Among Rogo Sports Hall

Yogyakarta has several supporting facilities in the field of sports. Kridosono Stadium is the oldest stadium in Yogyakarta, built during the colonial period along with the Kotabaru area. Besides Kridosono Stadium, there is also Mandala Krida Stadium, which is now the main stadium. This stadium is primarily used for football matches, as well as other events like drag races and Eid prayers. After a major renovation from 2013 to 2019, Mandala Krida Stadium now has more comprehensive facilities, including areas for rock climbing, beach volleyball, roller skating, tennis, motor racing, and archery. Not far from Mandala Krida Stadium, in the southeast area, there is Among Rogo Sports Hall, a multi-purpose sports arena frequently used for basketball and badminton championships.

Yogyakarta is the birthplace of the Football Association of Indonesia (PSSI), the national governing body for football in the country. It was founded by Soeratin Sosrosoegondo on April 19, 1930, initially under the name Persatuan Sepak Raga Seluruh Indonesia. The original building now serves as the PSSI Monument.

=== PSIM Yogyakarta ===
PSIM Yogyakarta was founded on September 5, 1929. The name Mataram was chosen because Yogyakarta was the center of the Mataram Sultanate (Kraton Ngayogyakarta Hadiningrat). PSIM uses Mandala Krida Stadium as its home ground. Currently, PSIM competes in the central region of Liga 2 Indonesia.

== Education ==
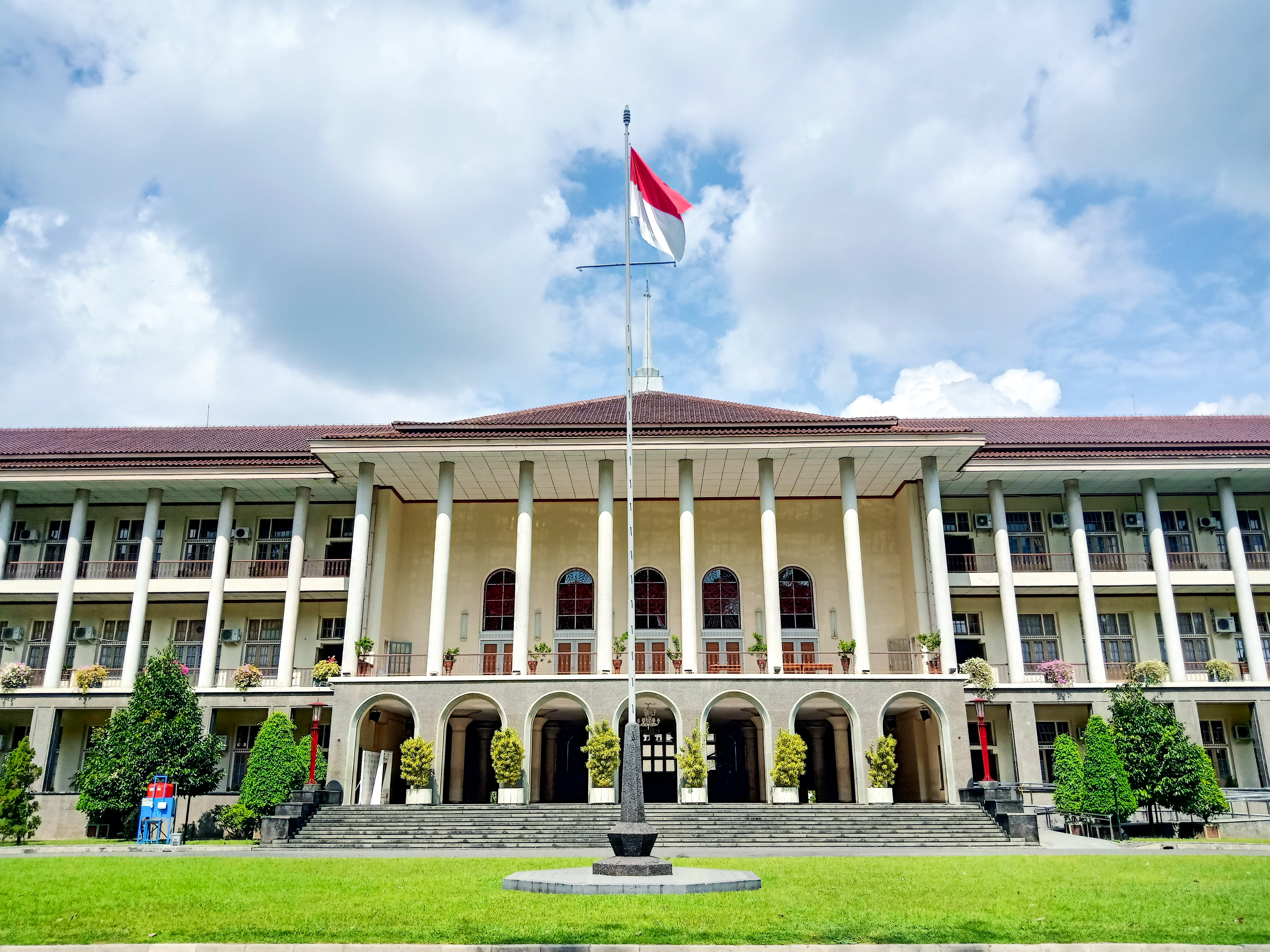
Gadjah Mada University

Yogyakarta is home to Gadjah Mada University, Indonesia's largest university and one of its most prominent. Other public universities in Yogyakarta include Yogyakarta State University, Sunan Kalijaga Islamic University, The Indonesian Institute of the Arts and Poltekkes Kemenkes Yogyakarta. There is also one public university in Yogyakarta providing education through distance learning or distance education at Universitas Terbuka or Indonesia Open University. The city is also the location of several well-known private universities such as Muhammadiyah University of Yogyakarta, College of Health Sciences Ahmad Yani Yogyakarta, Islamic University of Indonesia, Atma Jaya University, Duta Wacana Christian University, Ahmad Dahlan University and Sanata Dharma University.

The city is also home to the Indonesian Air Force Academy, located on the Adisucipto Airport complex.

Primagama, one of the largest tutoring institutions in Indonesia, is headquartered in the city.

== Transportation ==
=== Airport ===
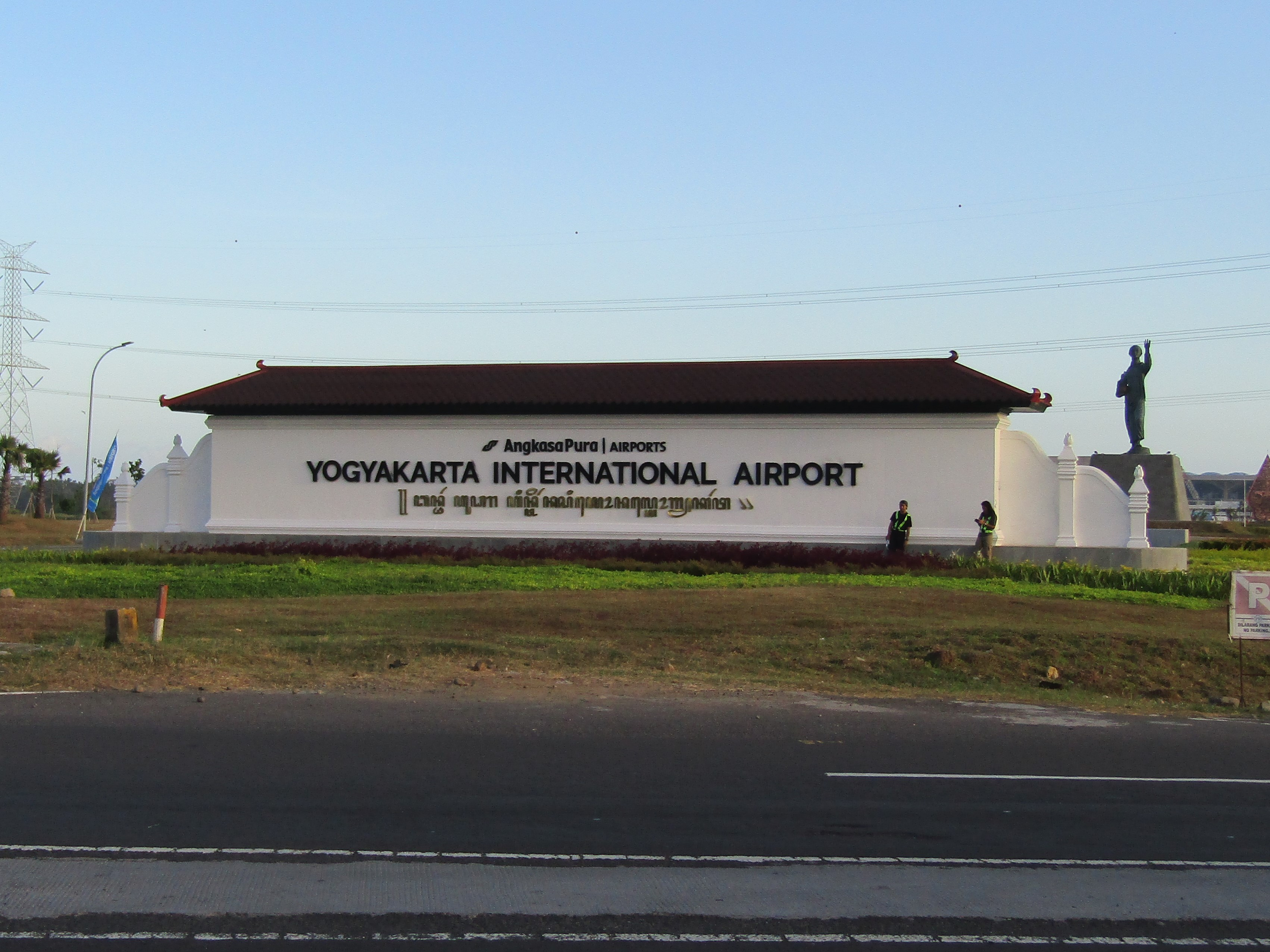
Yogyakarta International Airport signage from front view, with a name marker in the shape of a pyramid, the name in English, and Javanese script.

Yogyakarta is served primarily by Yogyakarta International Airport in Kulon Progo Regency, which connects the city with other major cities in Indonesia, such as Jakarta, Surabaya, Denpasar, Lombok, Makassar, Balikpapan, Banjarmasin, Pekanbaru, Palembang, and Pontianak. It also internationally connects the city with Kuala Lumpur (operated by AirAsia and Indonesia AirAsia). Another airport is Adisutjipto Airport in Sleman Regency, which only serves limited commercial planes.

=== Rail ===
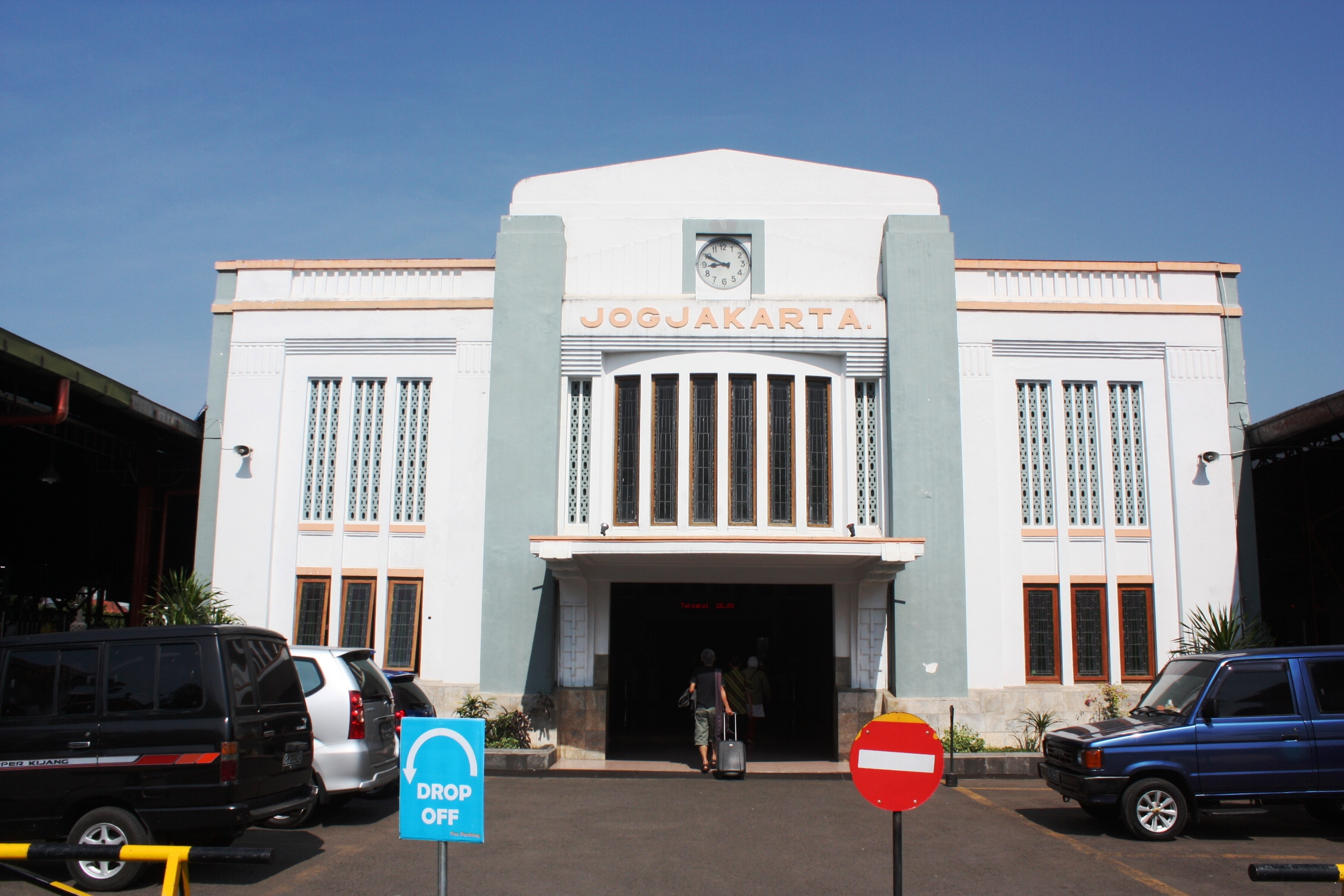
Yogyakarta railway station

Yogyakarta was first served by rail in 1872. The city is located on one of the two major railway lines that run across Java between Jakarta in the west and Surabaya in the east.

Yogyakarta has two passenger railway stations, Yogyakarta Station which serves business and executive class trains, and Lempuyangan Station which serves economy class trains; both stations are located in the centre of the city. Yogyakarta Station is the terminus of two commuter train services: KRL Commuterline Yogyakarta–Solo, which runs to Solo Balapan Station in the city of Surakarta and Prambanan Express (Prameks), which runs to Kutoarjo Station in Kutoarjo. Other commuter trains run from Madiun Jaya (Madiun Station-Lempuyangan Station), and Joglosemar (Semarang Poncol Station-Lempuyangan Station). Yogyakarta International Airport Rail Link links Yogyakarta International Airport to the city center.

=== Roads ===
The city has an extensive system of public city buses, and is a major departure point for inter-city buses to other cities in Java and Bali, as well as taxis, andongs, and becaks. Motorbikes are by far the most commonly used personal transportation, but an increasing number of residents own automobiles. Yogyakarta and surrounding areas also have a circle highway known as the Ring Road and overpasses including Janti Overpass, Lempuyangan Overpass, and a recently built Jombor Overpass.

=== Buses ===
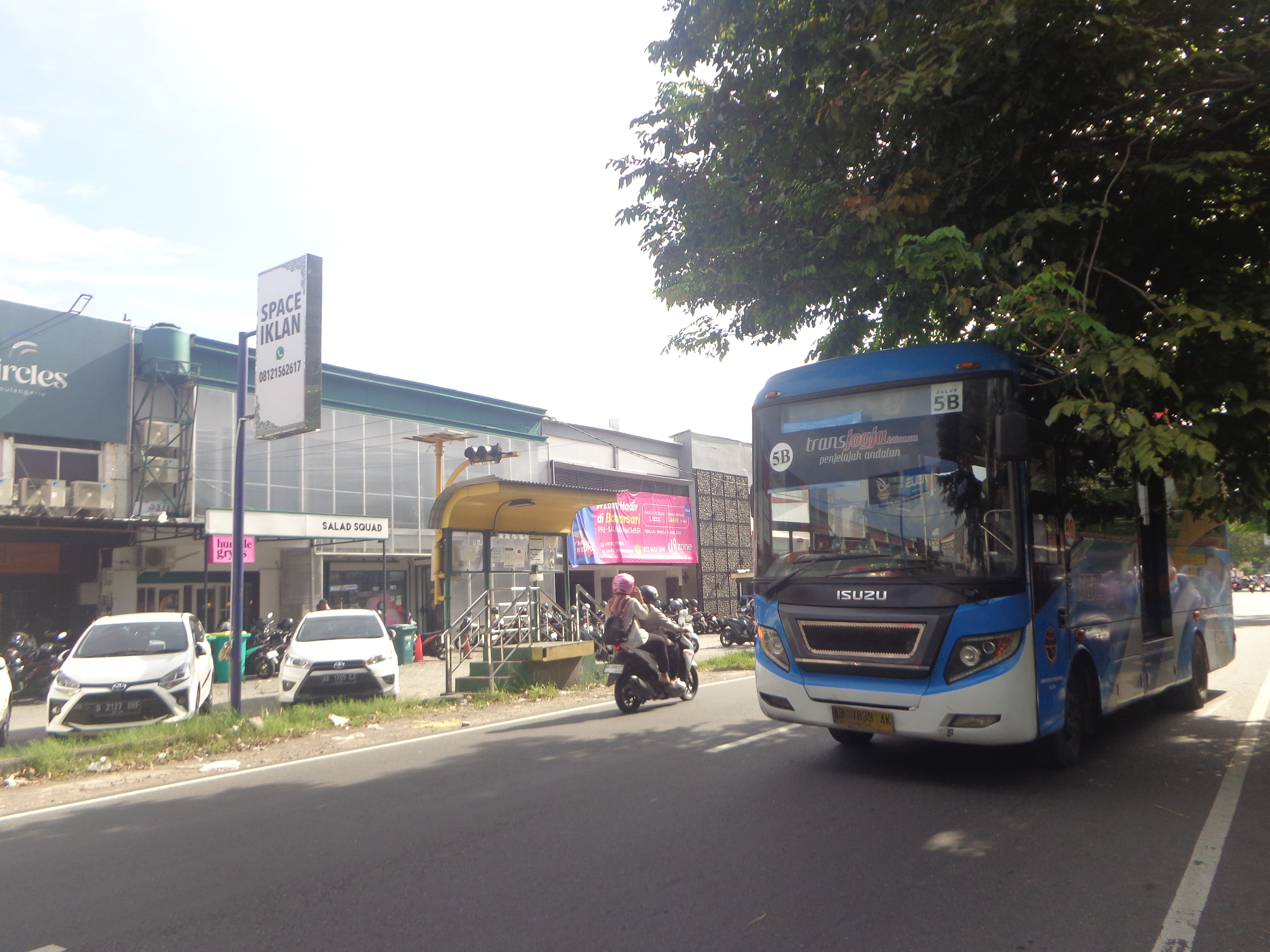
Trans Jogja Bus. A bus rapid transit system in Yogyakarta.

Since early 2008, the city has operated a bus rapid transit system, Trans Jogja, also known as "TJ". Trans Jogja is modelled after the TransJakarta system in the capital, but unlike TransJakarta, there is no special lane for Trans Jogja buses, which instead run on main streets. There are currently twenty Trans Jogja lines, with routes through the main streets of Yogyakarta, some of which overlap. The lines extend from the Pakem Bus Terminal in the north to the Palbapang Bus Terminal in the south, and from Godean in the west to the Prambanan bus shelter in the east via Adisucipto International Airport.

== Health facilities ==
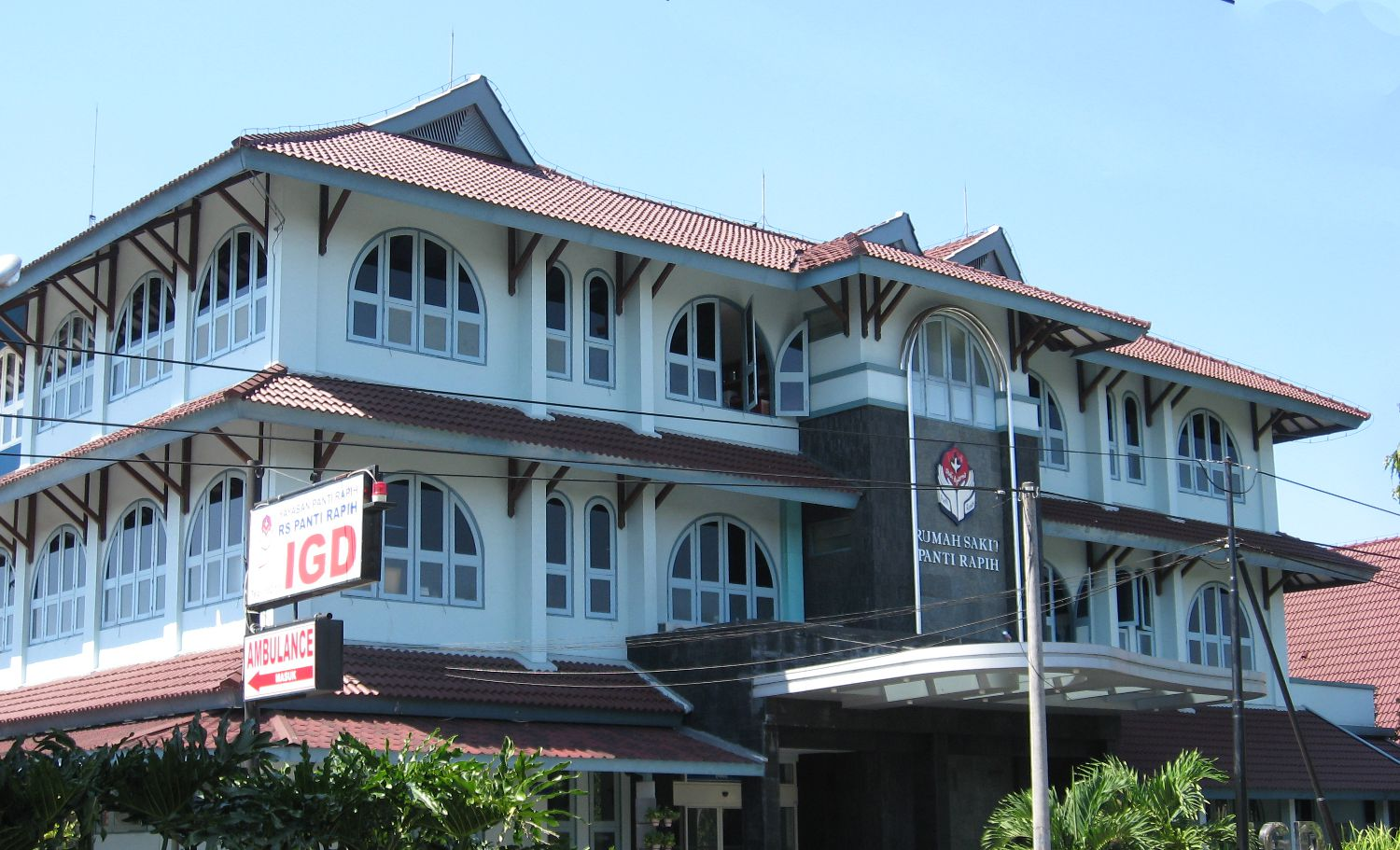
Main building of Panti Rapih Hospital

Notable hospitals in Yogyakarta include:

- Yogyakarta City General Public Hospital (RSUD Kota Yogyakarta)
- Bethesda Hospital
- Dr. Soetarto Army Hospital
- Dr. Sardjito General Hospital
- Panti Rapih Hospital
- PKU Muhammadiyah Hospital.

== Media ==
Kedaulatan Rakyat (KR) is the major newspaper in Yogyakarta. First published in 1945, the paper is one of the oldest continuously published newspapers in Indonesia.

== Twin towns – sister cities ==
Yogyakarta is twinned with:

- Baalbek, Lebanon
- Commewijne, Suriname
- Gangbuk District, Seoul, South Korea
- Huế, Vietnam
- Le Mont-Dore, New Caledonia
- Paramaribo, Suriname

== Notable people ==
- K. H. Ahmad Dahlan (1868–1923) - founder of Muhammadiyah
- Diponegoro (1785–1855) - Javanese prince and National Hero of Indonesia
- Siti Munjiyah (1896–1955) - women's movement activist
- Wikan Sakarinto (born 1975) - academic and politician
- Suharto (1921–2008), second and longest-serving President of Indonesia and military dictator

== See also ==
- List of cities in Indonesia
