= College of Health Sciences General Achmad Yani Yogyakarta =

Private university in Yogyakarta, Indonesia

University of General Ahmad Yani Yogyakarta
- Universitas Jenderal Ahmad Yani Yogyakarta
- Motto: Unggul dan Terdepan
- Motto in English: Excellence and Leading
- Type: Private
- Established: 15 June 2006
- Affiliations: Indonesian Army
- Location: West Ring Road Street, Gamping, Sleman, Special Region of Yogyakarta, Indonesia
- Campus: Integrated
- Website: unjaya.ac.id

The College of Health Sciences General Ahmad Yani Yogyakarta (Indonesian: Sekolah Tinggi Ilmu Kesehatan Jenderal Ahmad Yani Yogyakarta) or Stikes Jenderal Ahmad Yani is a private university located in the Sleman Regency province Special Region of Yogyakarta, Indonesia. It is an Education Institute under the auspices of the Kartika Eka Paksi Foundation.

== History ==
The college was established in Yogyakarta on June 15, 2006, by decree of the Minister of National Education No: 084 / DE / O / 2006, June 15, 2006, and Permissions Implementation of the Ministry of Health of Indonesia number: HK-03-241-02054. It includes facilities such as an international standard laboratory, a laboratory for medical simulation for midwifery and health community, a laboratory library, a consultation room for students, lecturers, and student parents, and a hotspot area.

== Departments ==
The college offers the following courses of study:

- Midwifery
- Nursing
- Medical records
- Professional nursing
- Pharmaceutical or Pharmacy
- Blood bank technology

== Facilities ==
The campus has five floors built in an integrated manner, on a total floor space of 12,000 m^{2}, and supporting facilities, teaching and learning activities.

Laboratory of international standard consist of:

- Nursing laboratory
- Lab. Basic nursing
- Lab. Emergency
- Lab. Medical Surgery
- Lab. Child nursing
- Lab. Maternity nursing
- Lab. Community nursing
- Lab. Psychiatric nursing
- Lab. Geriatric nursing
- Midwifery laboratory
- Lab. Family planning
- Lab. Pregnancy test
- Lab. Labor
- Lab. Childbed
- Lab. Newborn baby
- Lab. Biomedicine
- Lab. Medical records
- Lab. Skill Medical Record
- Lab. Coding
- Laboratory Support
- Lab. Computer
- Lab. Language
- Lab. Computer Based Test
- Hot Spot (Wifi)

Sports include table tennis, futsal, badminton, volleyball, basketball. Art: Band, choir and dance. Student dormitory

== International partnership ==
Stikes Ahmad Yani Yogyakarta cooperates with various public and private national and international institutions. These include

- (Japan) Takasaki University of Health and Welfare
- (Thailand) Khon Kaen University
- (Australia) University of Tasmania

== See also ==
- List of universities in Indonesia
- Education in Indonesia
