= Wihaji =

Indonesian politician (born 1976)

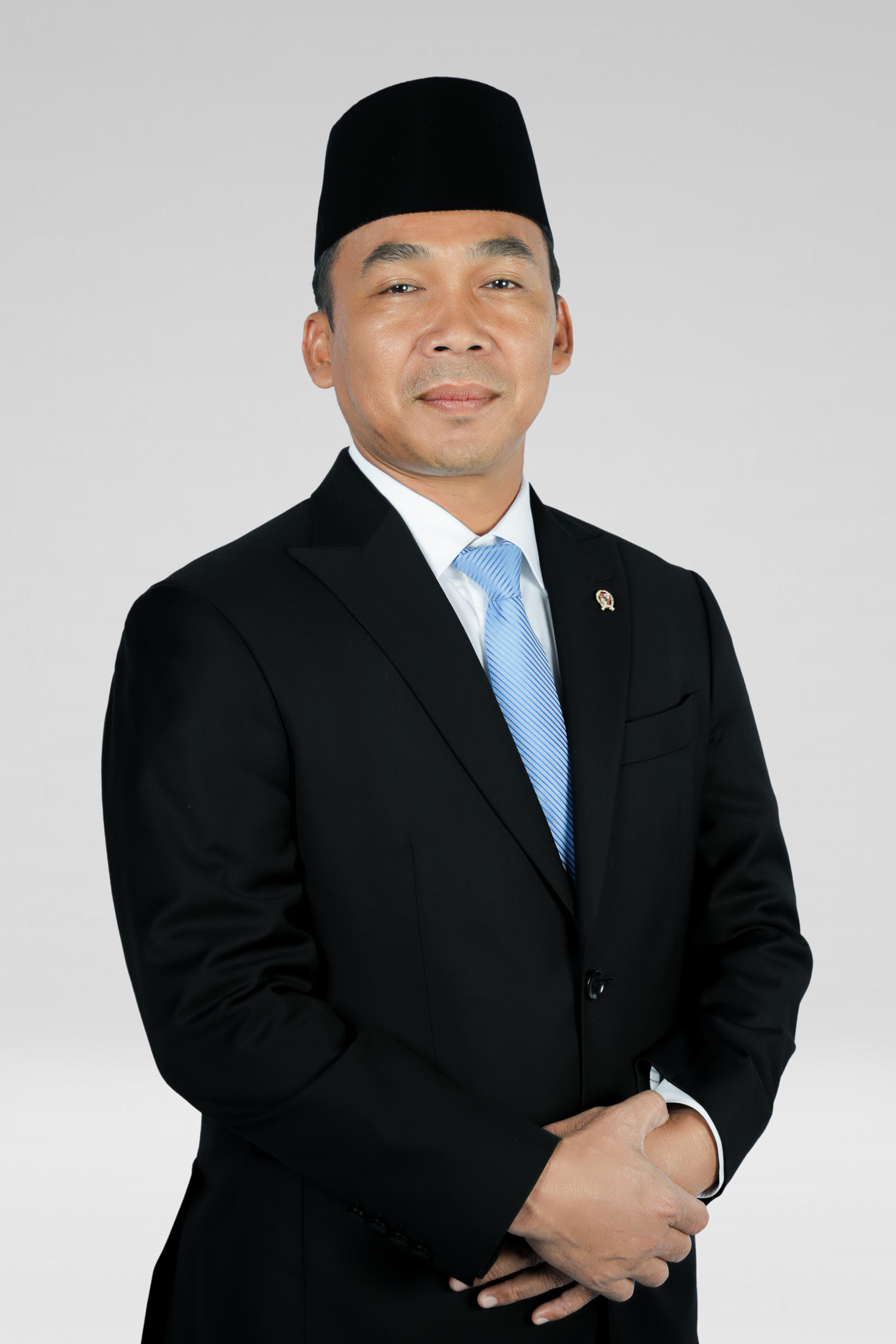

Minister of Population and Family Development Head of Population and Family Development Agency
- Incumbent
- Assumed office 21 October 2024
- President: Prabowo Subianto

10th Regent of Batang
- In office 22 May 2017 – 22 May 2022
- Preceded by: Yoyok Riyo Sudibyo
- Succeeded by: Lani Dwi Rejeki

Personal details
- Born: 22 August 1976 (age 49) Sragen, Central Java Province
- Party: Golkar
- Spouse: Uni Kuslantasi
- Children: 3

Wihaji (born 22 August 1976) is an Indonesian politician serving as minister of population and family development since 2024. From 2017 to 2022, he served as regent of Batang.
