= Hasto Wardoyo =

Indonesian politician (born 1964)

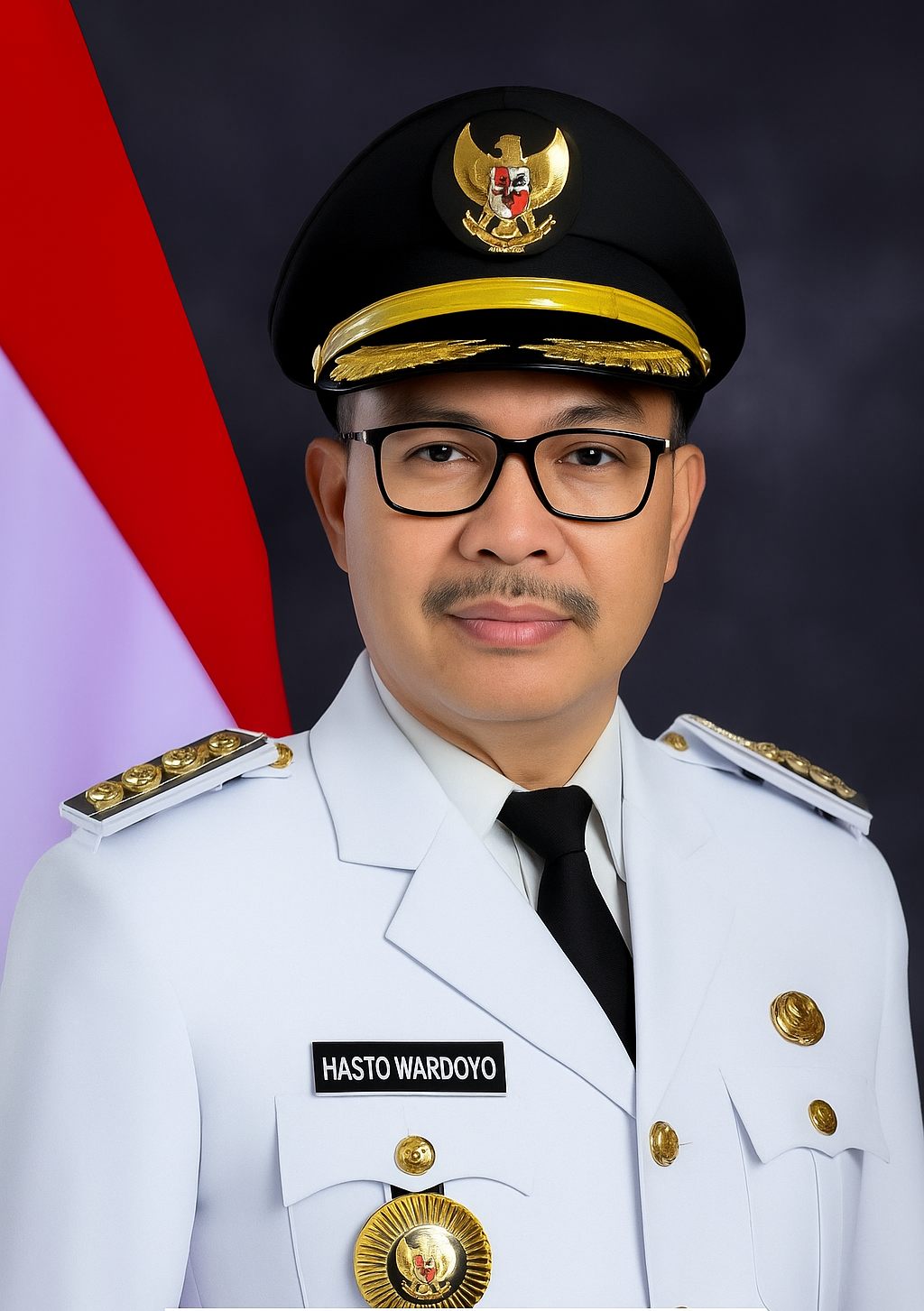
- 2025 portrait

Mayor of Yogyakarta
- Incumbent
- Assumed office 20 February 2025
- Preceded by: Haryadi Suyuti; Sugeng Purwanto (act.)

Head of the National Population and Family Planning Board
- In office 1 July 2019 – 8 September 2024
- Preceded by: Sigit Priohutomo
- Succeeded by: Wihaji (as minister)

Regent of Kulon Progo
- In office 22 May 2017 – 8 July 2019
- In office 24 August 2011 – 24 August 2016
- Preceded by: Toyo Santoso Dipo
- Succeeded by: Sutedjo

Personal details
- Born: 30 July 1964 (age 62) Kulon Progo, Yogyakarta, Indonesia
- Party: PDI-P
- Education: Gadjah Mada University

Hasto Wardoyo (born 30 July 1964) is an Indonesian politician of the Indonesian Democratic Party of Struggle and obstetrician who has been mayor of the city of Yogyakarta since February 2025. He was previously head of the National Population and Family Planning Board (BKKBN) between 2019 and 2024, and was also the regent of Kulon Progo Regency in 2011–2016 and 2017–2019.

Originating in Kulon Progo, Hasto worked as an obstetrician after graduating from Gadjah Mada University, initially in East Kalimantan before joining a hospital in Yogyakarta and establishing his own clinic. He was elected regent of his home regency in 2011, and during his tenure promoted local purchasing, being reelected in 2017. He resigned from his post in 2019 due to his BKKBN appointment. He also resigned from BKKBN in 2024 to run as mayor of Yogyakarta.

== Early life ==
Hasto Wardoyo was born in Kulon Progo Regency on 30 July 1964. According to Hasto in an interview, he herded goats in his childhood. He studied at public schools in Kulon Progo, and after completing high school, he enrolled at the Faculty of Medicine at Gadjah Mada University, specialising in obstetrics and gynaecology and graduating in 1989. He would receive specialist degrees from Gadjah Mada in 2000 and 2006.

== Career ==
Between 1990 and 1995, he worked at several puskesmas in the Kutai area in East Kalimantan, before joining the Dr. Sardjito Hospital in Yogyakarta. In 2010, he became head of the obstetrics and gynaecology program at Sardjito. In 2005, he opened his own practice in Yogyakarta, which gradually grew to become a mother and child hospital. He also became a lecturer at Gadjah Mada in 2000.

=== Kulon Progo ===
In 2011, Hasto ran in the regency election of Kulon Progo with the backing of the Indonesian Democratic Party of Struggle (PDI-P), the National Mandate Party, and the United Development Party. With Sutedjo as running mate, he defeated three other candidates and secured 46.3% of votes. Their first term was from 24 August 2011 to 24 August 2016. They would be reelected in the 2017 regency election with 86% (220,643) votes, and were sworn in for a second term on 22 May 2017. During his terms as regent, he remained active at a physician, practising in the evening.

As regent, Hasto in 2013 launched a "Buy Kulonprogo" program, which oriented municipal employees to buy local products. The municipal government also organised farmer cooperatives to improve packaging and marketing. Rice was a focus, with the municipal government working with the national Bulog agency to purchase Kulonprogo's rice crop. Municipal employees were also required to buy at least 10 kg of locally produced rice monthly. Other promoted products included locally grown tea and coffee, packaged under the "Suroloyo" brand.

Hasto directed the municipal water company to create its own brand of bottled water, required local students to wear locally-produced Batik once a week, and initially prohibited national convenience store chains (such as Indomaret and Alfamart) from operating in Kulon Progo outside of joint ventures with local entrepreneurs. Hasto also issued bylaws which prohibited cigarette advertising and restricted public smoking in Kulon Progo. He cited the local spending on cigarettes – Rp 93 billion (USD 7 million) in 2018 – exceeding the government spending on infrastructure. The municipal government also subsidised the renovation of "unlivable homes" in Kulon Progo, amounting to around 1,000 homes annually.

The Yogyakarta International Airport, located within Kulon Progo, began construction during his tenure.

=== BKKBN ===
In June 2019, Hasto announced his resignation as regent due to President Joko Widodo appointing him head of the National Population and Family Planning Board (BKKBN). He was sworn in on 1 July 2019, and his resignation as regent was officially announced on 8 July. During his time at BKKBN, Hasto changed the organisation's logo and motto for outreach reasons, simplified contraceptive products distributed by the organisation to make it more accessible, and widened their distribution to include privately-run clinics.

=== Yogyakarta ===
On 8 September 2024, Hasto resigned from his BKKBN office to run in Yogyakarta's mayoral election with the backing of PDI-P. With Wawan Harmawan as running mate, they won a three-way race with 87,485 votes (44.4%). They were sworn in, along with other regional leaders elected in 2024, on 20 February 2025.

As mayor of Yogyakarta, Hasto also promoted local purchasing. He announced that an initial priority would be trash handling, and that he would reallocate a Rp 3 billion (~USD 180,000) budget for his official car to trash handling.

== Personal life ==
He is married to Dwikisworo Setyowireni, and the couple has four children. In 2024, one of his sons, Rizal Aldyatama, was elected into Kulon Progo's municipal legislature as a PDI-P member in the 2024 legislative election. Rizal was the legislature's youngest member in 2024.
