= Siti Djirzanah Mosque =

Mosque in Yogyakarta, Indonesia

Coordinates: 7°47′54″S 110°21′54″E

- Masjid Siti Djirzanah
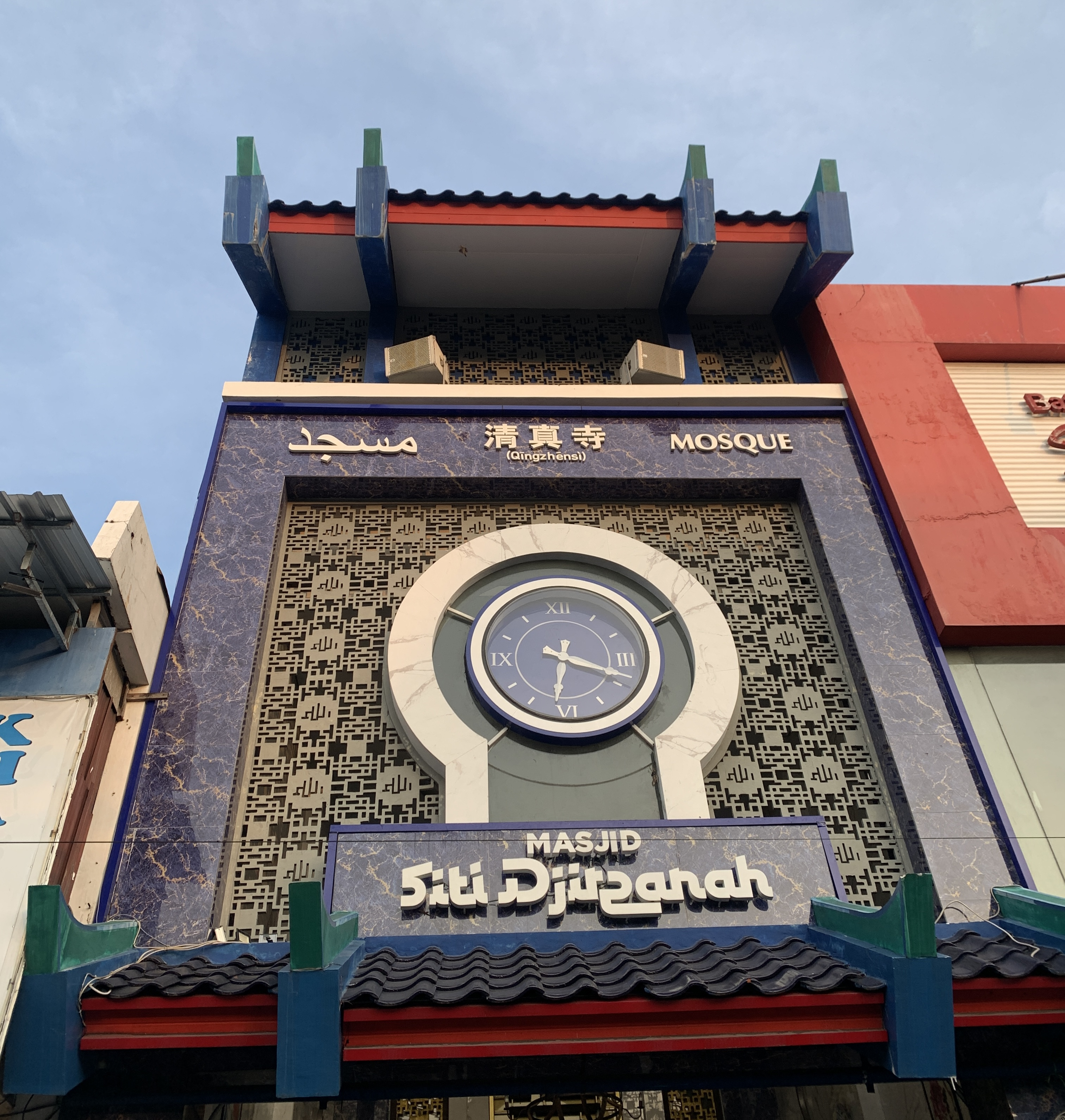

Religion
- Affiliation: Islam
- Province: Special Region of Yogyakarta

Location
- Location: Yogyakarta
- Country: Indonesia
- Interactive map of Siti Djirzanah Mosque

Architecture
- Type: Mosque

The Siti Djirzanah Mosque (Indonesian: Masjid Siti Djirzanah) is a mosque with Chinese and Dutch architectural characteristics located in the tourist area of Jalan Malioboro, across from Beringharjo Market in Yogyakarta, Indonesia.

== History ==
Siti Djirzanah Mosque was built by the former mayor of Yogyakarta, Herry Zudianto, and his family, to honor his mother, Siti Djirzanah, who died in 2009. Before the mosque was built, the space was used as a shop.

Construction of the mosque began in May 2017 and it was inaugurated on August 10, 2018.

== Architecture ==
Siti Djirzanah Mosque is 12 meters tall and its footprint covers 147 square meters. It stands in a row of shops on the east side of Malioboro, between Soenardi batik shop and an electronics store.

The mosque is built in a Chinese style, as based on parameters set by the Yogyakarta Ministry of Culture. Because the mosque is located in the historical Malioboro area, the Ministry of Culture was involved in approving the architectural plans. The area of Malioboro includes a sizeable Chinese population, which is why Chinese architecture was chosen.

On the facade of the mosque are the words for "mosque" in Chinese characters (Hanzi: 清真寺), romanized text ("Qingzhensi"), English, and Arabic. Below this is a large, round clock. The mosque does not have a dome or rooftop ornament (Indonesian: mustaka), as in other mosques. Instead, the roof resembles that of a Chinese temple. The mosque's interior and exterior make use of a blue and yellow color scheme; the interior walls are covered with imported blue granite. The men's hall is located on the upper floor and the women's hall is on the lower floor.

== See also ==
- List of mosques in Indonesia
