= Dharma Wiratama Museum =

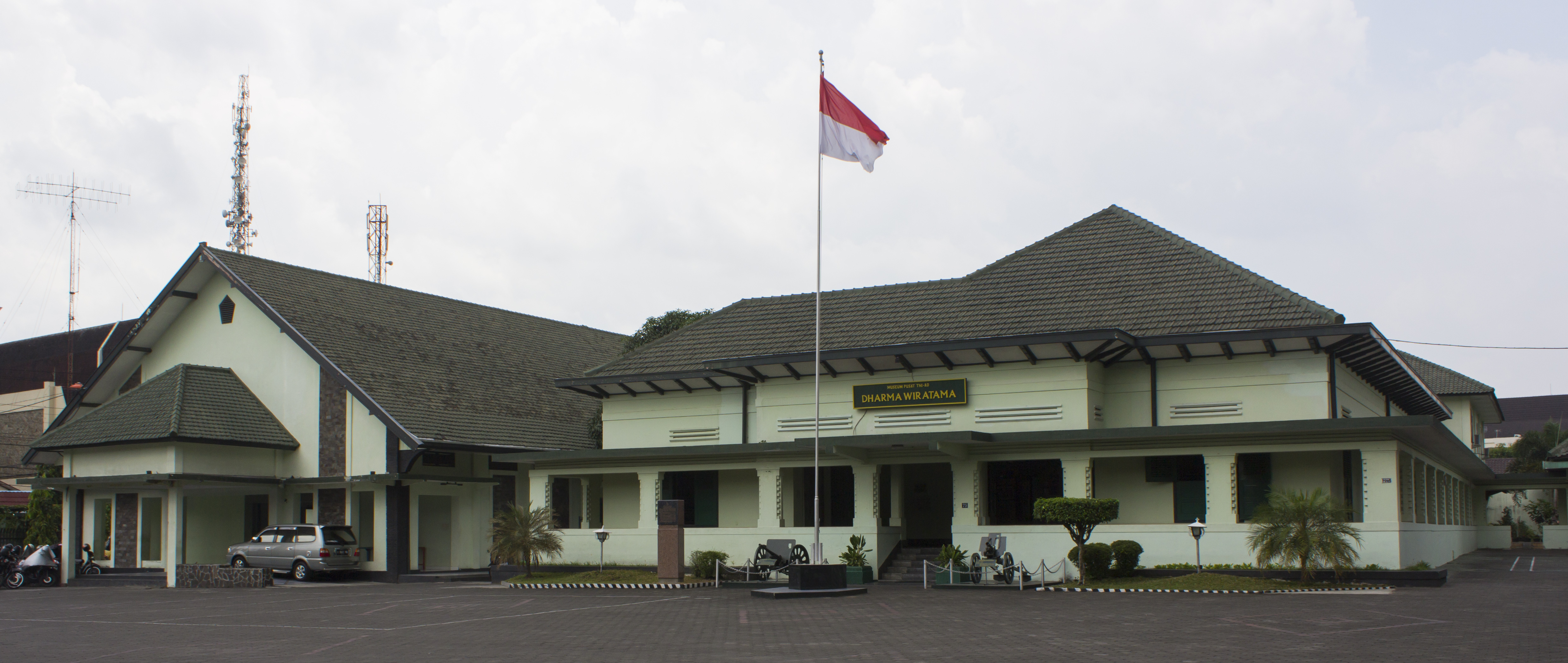
- The museum

- Location in Yogyakarta
- Established: 30 August 1982
- Location: Yogyakarta, Indonesia
- Coordinates: 7.782883°S 110.3755°E
- Type: Military museum
- Public transit access: Trans Jogja: 2B, 3A, 4A, 4B, 5B, 11 (Cik Di Tiro 1); 1B, 2A, 3B, 4A (Cik Di Tiro 2)
- Website: www.musmonpus-disjarahad.com

Dharma Wiratama Museum, officially the Dharma Wiratama Central Army Museum (Indonesian: Museum Pusat TNI AD Dharma Wiratama) is a military museum centred on the history of the Indonesian Army from its inception in 1945 up through the coup of 30 September 1965 and Indonesian peacekeeping missions. It is located in the former national army headquarters in Yogyakarta.

== Overview ==
Dharma Wiratama Museum is officially known as the Dharma Wiratama Central Army Museum (Indonesian: Museum Pusat TNI AD Dharma Wiratama). It is located at 75 Sudirman Street, on the corner of Sudirman and Cik di Tiro Streets, in Yogyakarta, Indonesia. It holds 4,289 items in its collection. Many have explanatory captions, although only some are in English.

== History ==
The building which now houses the museum was constructed by the Dutch colonial government in 1904 as an official residence for the official in charge of managing plantations throughout central Java. During the Japanese occupation of the Dutch East Indies from 1942 to 1945 the building was occupied by the Japanese forces, which used it as a military barracks.

With the Japanese defeat in World War II imminent, Indonesia proclaimed its independence on 17 August 1945. Almost two months later, Oerip Soemohardjo, a Dutch-trained soldier who had formerly been an officer in the Royal Netherlands East Indies Army, was tasked with establishing a new national army, based in Yogyakarta. Though he temporarily used a room at Hotel Merdeka (now Grand Hotel De Djokja) for his base of command, soon the Sultan of Yogyakarta, Hamengkubuwono IX, donated the former Japanese barracks to be the Army's designated headquarters.

The first commander-in-chief of the Indonesian Armed Forces, Sudirman, was elected in the building on 12 November 1945. During the Indonesian National Revolution (1945–49), the building was center of authority for soldiers throughout the new nation. After the revolution concluded, the armed forces moved their main headquarters to the national capital at Jakarta. The building was then used as the base for Korem 072/Pmk, a subdivision of Kodam IV/Diponegoro.

The museum was inaugurated on 30 August 1982 by General Poniman, commander of Kodam IV/Diponegoro. It is used as the departure point for military cadets who must retrace the 100-kilometre (62 mi) long route used by Sudirman on his guerrilla campaign before they can graduation.

== Contents ==
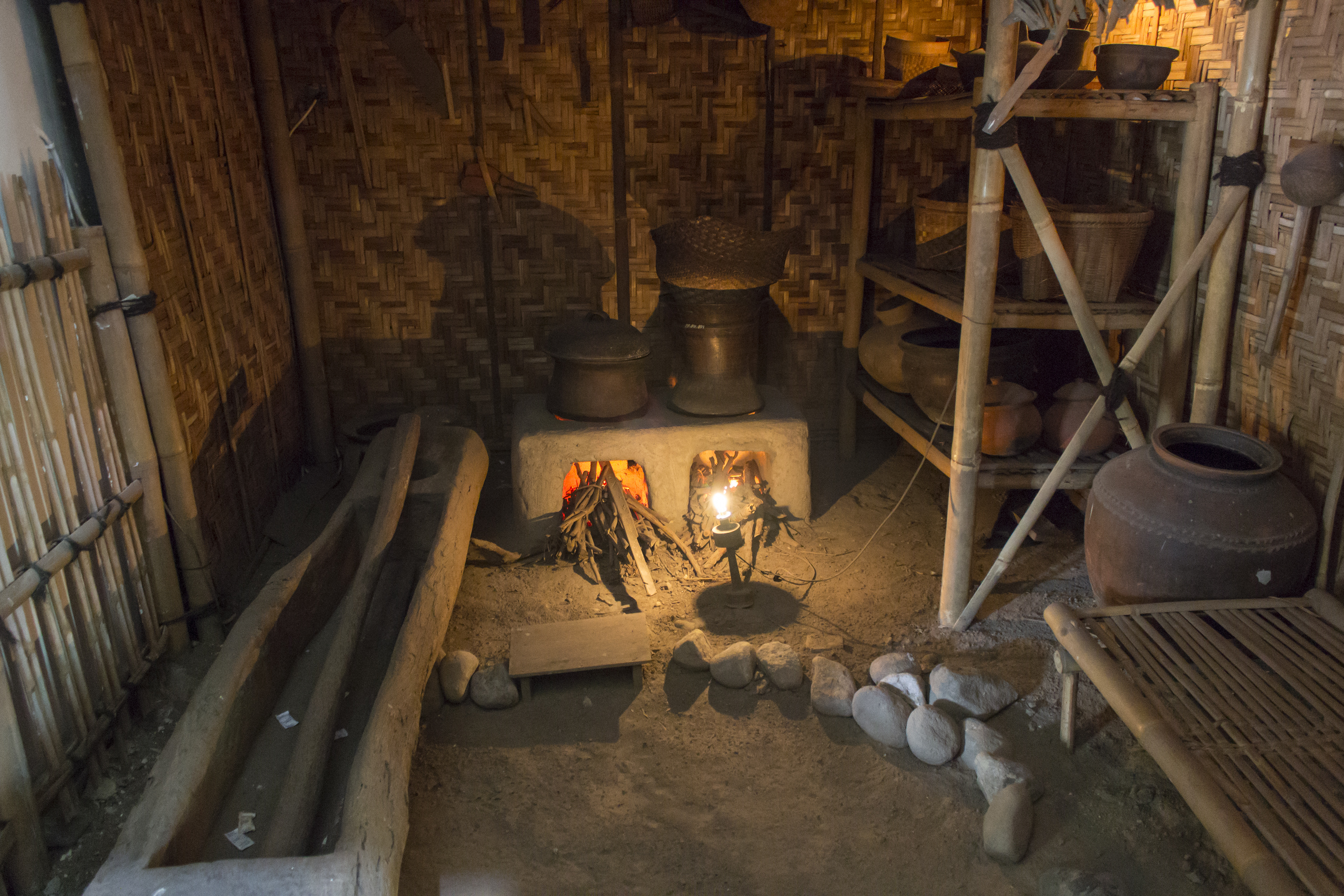
The field kitchen mock-up

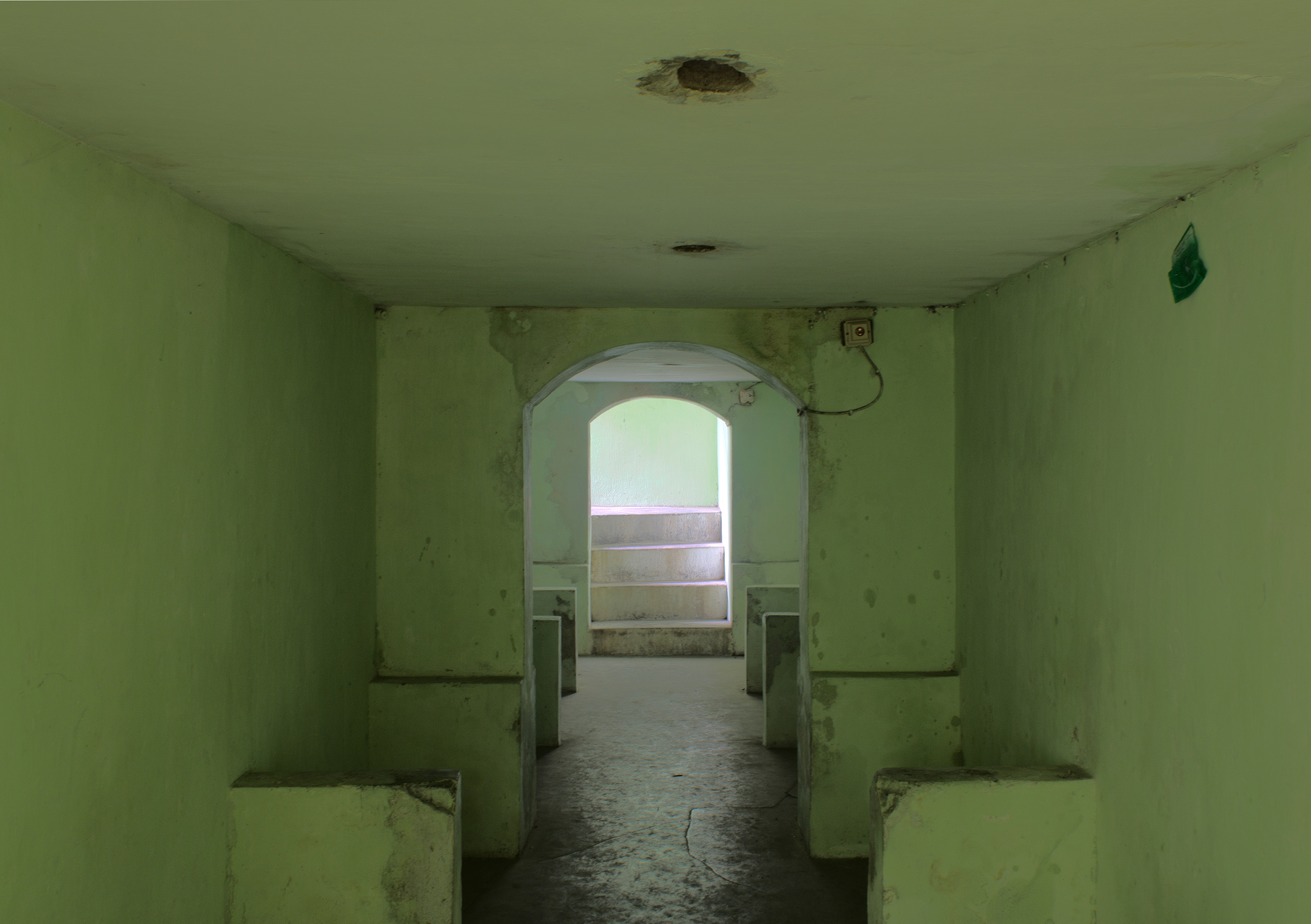
Interior of the bunker

The museum consists of 20 display rooms, each with a different focus. At the entrance visitors are given a short history of the museum and can see portraits of former Chiefs of Staff of the army. On either side of the entrance are rooms dedicated to Sudirman (to the east) and Oerip (to the west), the first leaders of the Indonesian military. North of the entrance is the "war room" (ruang palagan), which contains artefacts and orders of battle from eight battles which took place during the Indonesian National Revolution: the Battle of Medan Area, Battle of Palembang, Razing of Bandung, Battle of Semarang, Battle of Ambarawa, Battle of Surabaya, Battle of Margarana, and Battle of Makassar. After the war room, visitors see displays of various weaponry, a mock-up of a field kitchen used during the revolution, and a collection of communications and medical equipment. The following three rooms are dedicated to the revolution.

Beginning with room 11, exhibits focus on post-revolution army history. The first part of this section is the banner room, which displays banners from various Army units. This is followed by a collection of uniforms, then by a room of medals. The three rooms after this are focused on various military operations in the 1950s, including the crackdown on the Darul Islam, fights against the Communist Party of Indonesia, and several separatist elements. This is followed by another room of equipment, including communications equipment and weapons, then one detailing the early years of the Garuda Contingent, Indonesia's contribution to United Nations peacekeeping missions.

The final two rooms are dedicated to the 1960s. The first is dedicated to the "heroes of the revolution" ("pahlawan revolusi"), nine military officers who were killed in the early hours of 1 October 1965 by the 30 September Movement and later made National Heroes of Indonesia. The final room is dedicated to the elimination of the Communist Party of Indonesia, which the Army blames for the 30 September movement. This collection includes a uniform worn by Colonel Sarwo Edhie Wibowo and weapons and doctrinal material from the Communist Party.

In front of the museum there is a statue of Sudirman and Oerip, referred to as the "Dwitunggal" (literally "two yet one"). The museum also includes a hall for special events, an underground bunker, and administrative areas.

== Works cited ==
- Backshall, Stephen (2003). Rough Guide to Indonesia. Rough Guide. ISBN 1-85828-991-2.
- Imran, Amrin (1980). Panglima Besar Jenderal Soedirman [Commander in Chief General Soedirman] (in Indonesian). Jakarta: Mutiara. OCLC 220643587.
- Imran, Amrin (1983). Urip Sumohardjo (in Indonesian). Jakarta: Department of Education and Culture. OCLC 10945069.
- McGregor, Katharine E (2007). History in Uniform: Military Ideology and the Construction of Indonesia's Past. Honolulu: University of Honolulu Press. ISBN 978-9971-69-360-2.
- Museum Pusat TNI AD Wiratama Kusuma (brochure) (in Indonesian), Army History Department, 2013
- Soemohardjo-Soebroto, Rohmah (1973). Oerip Soemohardjo : Letnen Jenderal TNI (22 Februari 1893 – 17 November 1948) [Oerip Soemohardjo : Lieutenant General of the TNI (22 February 1893 – 17 November 1948)] (in Indonesian). Jakarta: Gunung Agung. OCLC 13266021.

== See also ==
- List of museums and cultural institutions in Indonesia
