= MGW =

MGW may refer to:

- Maguwo railway station, Indonesia (station code)
- Maximum gross weight, abbreviated "m g w" on road signs
- Media gateway, a translation unit between telecommunications networks
- Morgantown Municipal Airport, United States (IATA code)
- Morgan Gibbs-White, professional footballer
- Marianne Geraldine Walker, a soon to be doctor at the University of Loughborough
