= Maguwo railway station =

Railway station in Indonesia

Y03 Maguwo Station Stasiun Maguwo
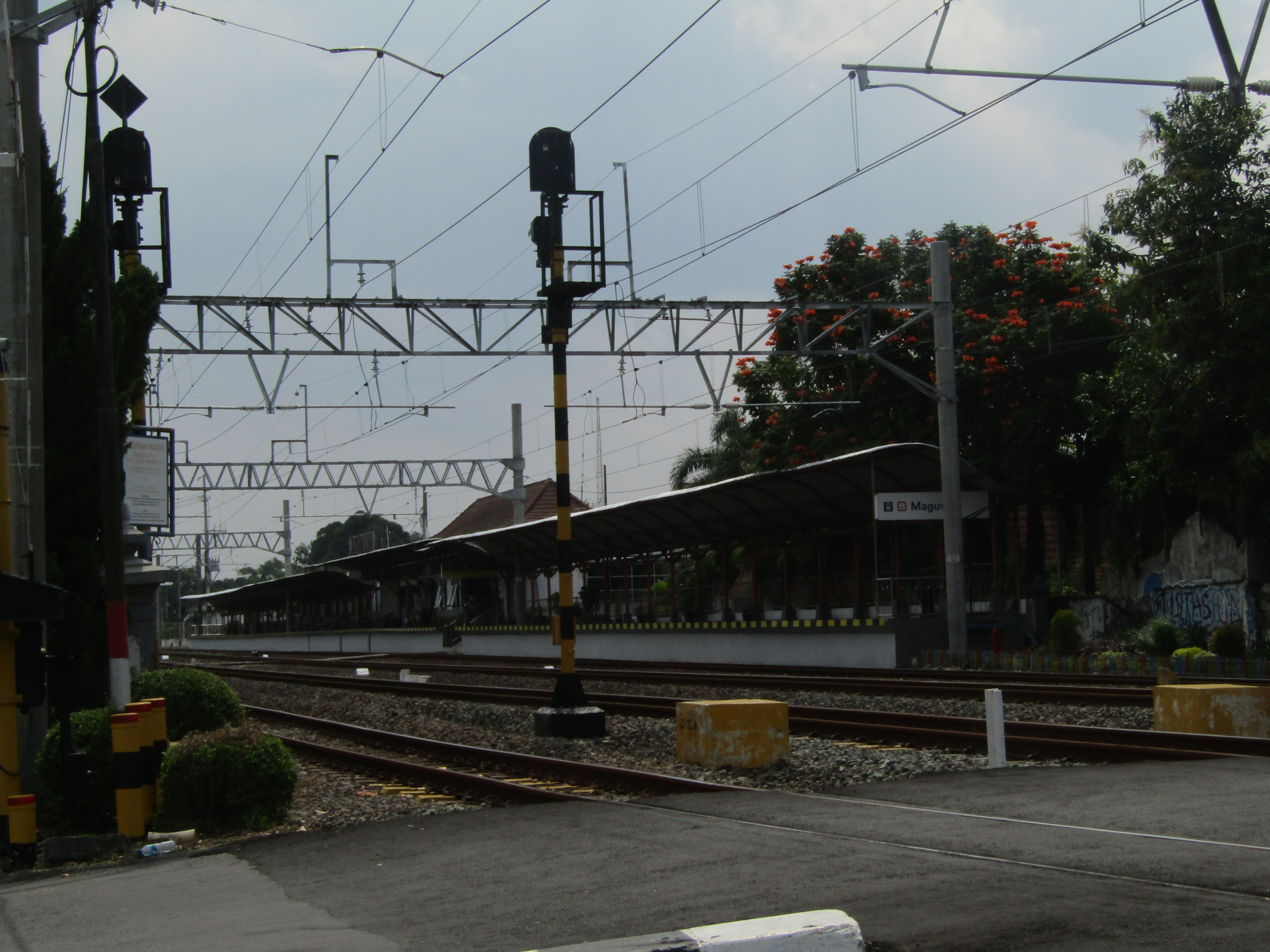
- Maguwo Station after being electrified, as of 2021

General information
- Location: Jl. Bandara Adisucipto, Maguwoharjo, Depok, Sleman Regency; Special Region of Yogyakarta; Indonesia
- Coordinates: 7.784968°S 110.43677°E
- Elevation: +118 m (387 ft)
- Owner: Kereta Api Indonesia
- Operator: KAI Commuter
- Lines: Yogyakarta Line; Kutoarjo–Purwosari
- Platforms: 2 side platforms
- Tracks: 4
- Connections: Trans Jogja Line 1A; Trans Jogja Line 1B; Trans Jogja Line 3A; Trans Jogja Line 3B

Construction
- Structure type: Ground
- Parking: Available
- Accessible: Available

Other information
- Station code: MGW • 3101
- IATA code: JOG
- Classification: Class II

History
- Opened: 10 June 1872 (Original building); 2 June 2008 (Current building)
- Rebuilt: 2000s
- Electrified: 2020

Services
| Preceding station | | Following station |
|---|---|---|
| Lempuyangan towards Yogyakarta | Yogyakarta Line | Brambanan towards Palur |
Location
- Location within Java

Maguwo Station (MGW) is a Class II airport railway station located in Maguwoharjo, Depok, Sleman Regency, Special Region of Yogyakarta, Indonesia. The station, which is located at an altitude of +118 meters, is included in the Operational Region VI Yogyakarta. It is the eastern and northernmost active station in Special Region of Yogyakarta, as well as the first airport railway station in Indonesia as it is located in front of Adisutjipto Airport. Currently it has four railway tracks with tracks 2 and 3 being straight tracks.

To the east of the station, before Brambanan Station, there was Kalasan Station which has been inactive since the operation of Kutoarjo–Solo Balapan double-track line.

To support the double track operation on Kutoarjo–Solo Balapan route, the mechanical signaling system at the station was replaced with an electric one by PT Len Industri (Persero) which had been installed since 2013 and began operating on 1 October 2018.

== History ==
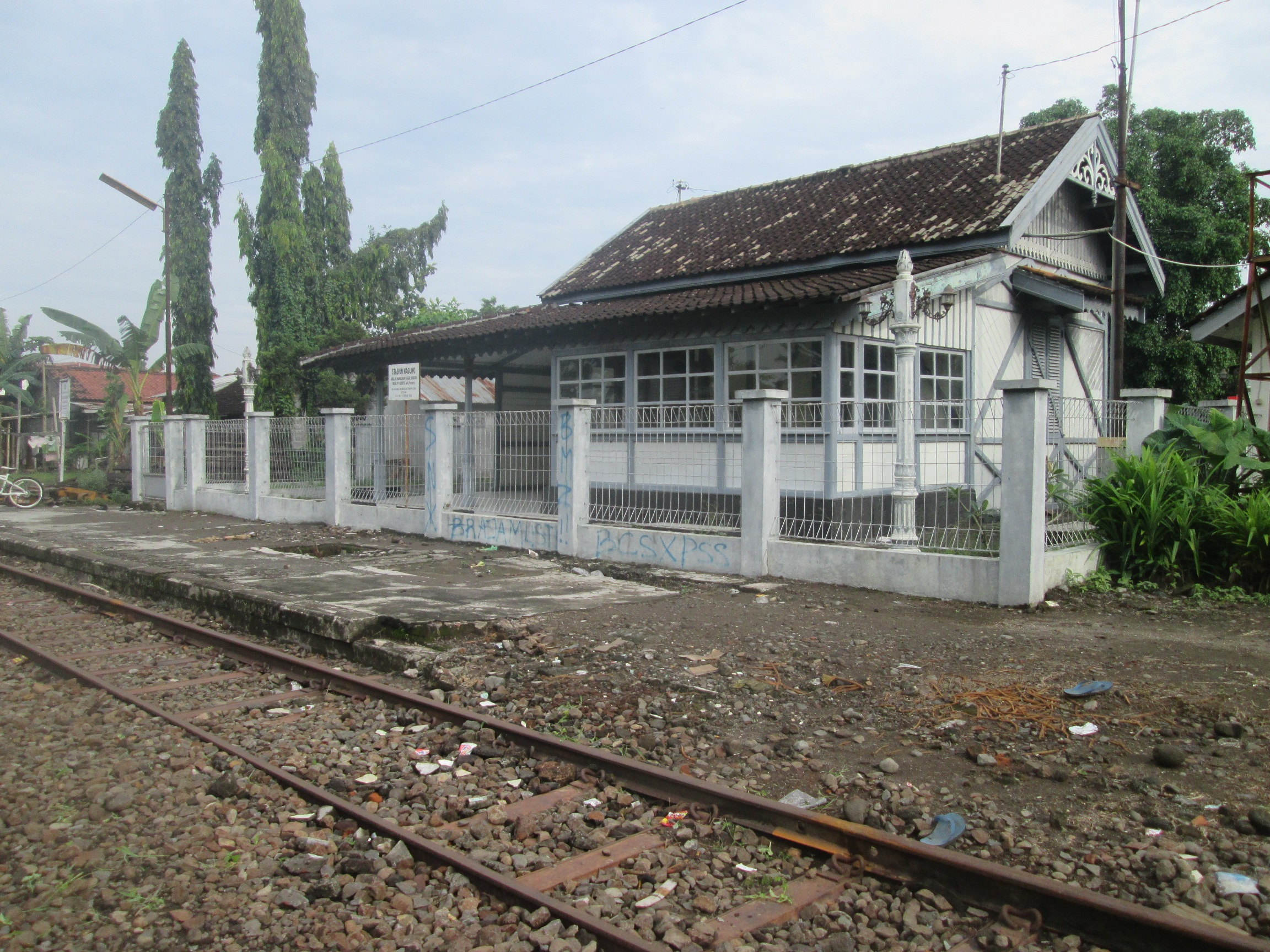
The old station building after the first renovation in 2010 (photo was taken on 8 March 2015)...

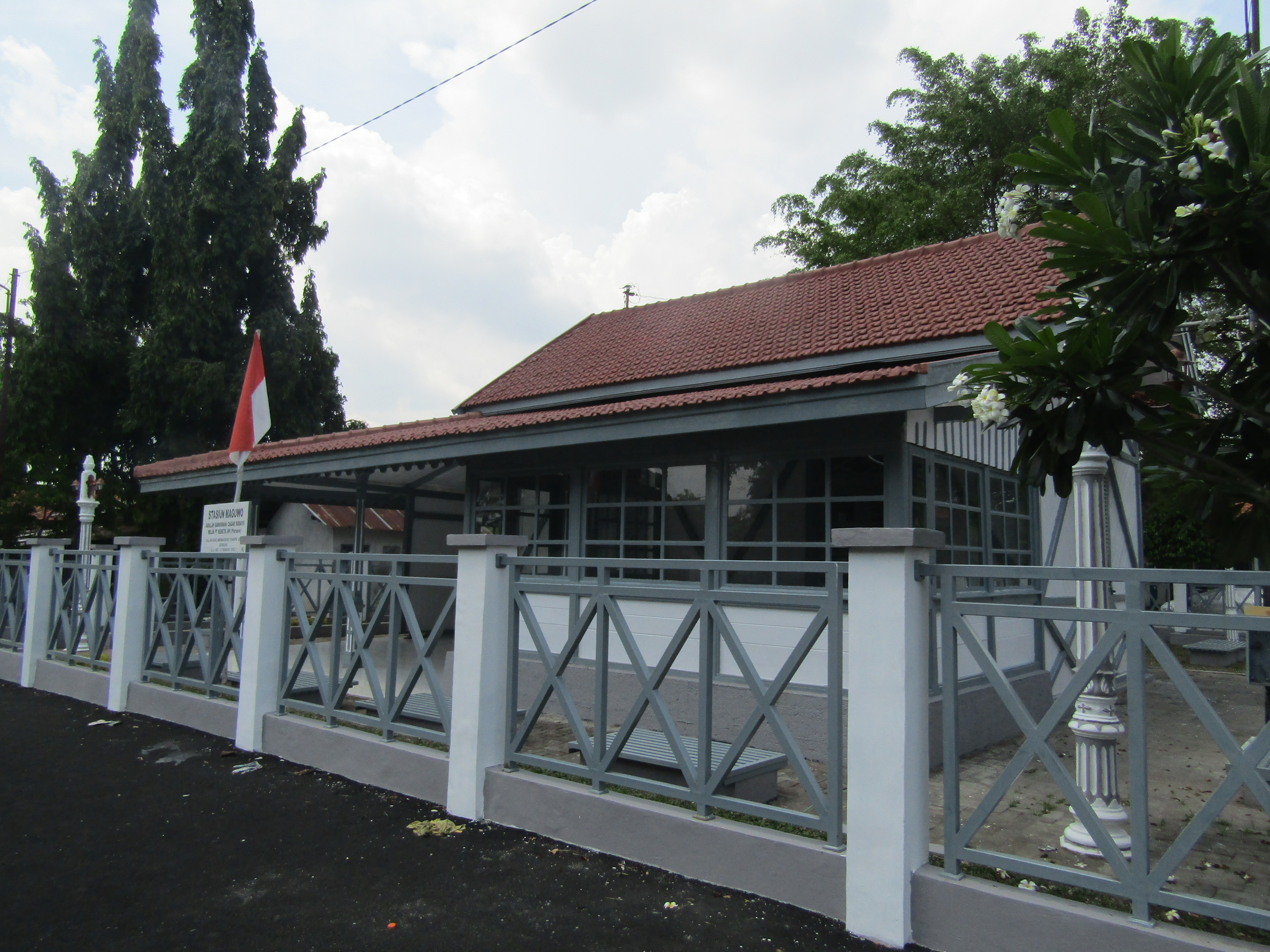
...and after the second renovation in 2019 (photo was taken on 19 December 2019).

Maguwo Station original building is a cultural heritage. Track 1 is now used for Pupuk Sriwidjaja Palembang freight train to go to a warehouse located west of the station.

Originally, Maguwo Station was just a small station whose function was only to be a crossing point for long-distance trains, loading and unloading of the Pupuk Sriwidjaja Palembang (abbreviated as PUSRI) carriages to the warehouse emplacement, and a turn-off point for boiler cars to supply aviation fuel.

According to the 2004 KAI railway timetable (Gapeka), the old Maguwo Station has four railway tracks with track 2 being a straight track. There are four dead-end siding tracks (the first two was connected to track 1 and the rest was connected to track 4). The siding on track 4 was previously used for Pertamina's avtur boiler train for the Cilacap–Maguwo route, while the siding on line 1 was used for the landing and storage of the Pupuk Sriwidjaya Palembang train, whose warehouse is to the west of the station. The station remained in use during line switching from single to double track.

With the completion of the Yogyakarta-Solo Balapan double track and due to the construction of a more suitable Adisucipto Airport, a new Maguwo Station was built a few hundred meters to the east to facilitate access for passengers to and from the airport. The new Maguwo Station started trial on 2 June 2008. A few months later the old Maguwo Station building was officially closed and made a cultural heritage by the Center for Conservation and Architectural Design Unit of KAI because of historical value; one of them is as a background in the historical film Janur Kuning (1979).

Starting in March 2015, the track in front of the old Maguwo Station is used as a transfer point for the Pusri Palembang fertilizer freight to the warehouse located west of the old station. Another destination of the freight is to Gombong and Ceper stations and from Cilacap Station.

== Building and layout ==
Maguwo Station has four railway tracks, with line 2 and 3 are straight tracks.

The station is functioned as an airport station that serve trains to transport passengers between Adisutjipto Airport, Yogyakarta, and Solo Balapan, as well as being an integrated transit point in the Special Region of Yogyakarta. The station is now equipped with a pedestrian underpass that connects passengers directly from the station. On the front yard, there are also functioning bus stops for the inner-city transportation system Trans Jogja.

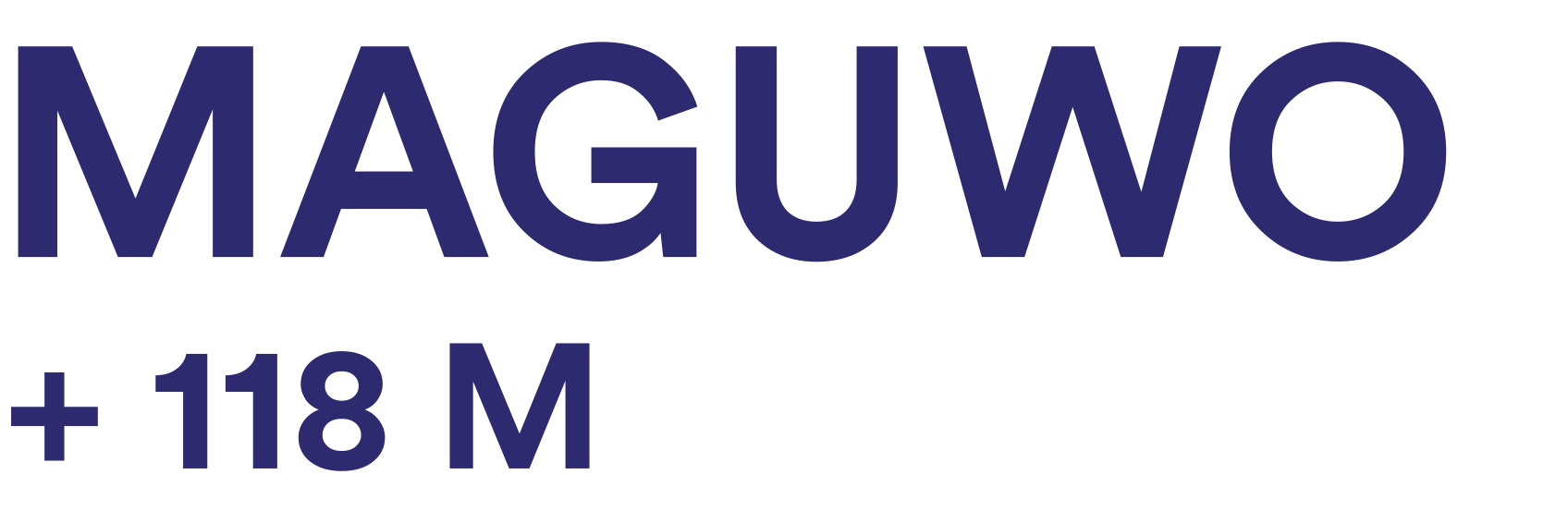
Y03
| G | Main building |
| P Platform floor | Side platform, the doors are opened on the right side |
| P Platform floor | Line 1 | ← (Lempuyangan) Yogyakarta Line to Yogyakarta |
| P Platform floor | Line 2 | Straight tracks to Yogyakarta |
| P Platform floor | Line 3 | Straight tracks to Solo Balapan |
| P Platform floor | Line 4 | Yogyakarta Line to Solo Balapan (Brambanan) → |
| P Platform floor | Side platform, the doors are opened on the right side |

== Services ==
Maguwo station is only serves KRL Commuter Yogyakarta Line, to Yogyakarta and to Palur.

| Train line name | Destination | Notes |
|---|---|---|
| Yogyakarta Line | Yogyakarta | – |
| Yogyakarta Line | Palur | – |
| Yogyakarta Line | Solo Balapan | – |

== Supporting transportation ==
The station has bus connection through Bandara Adisutjipto bus stop of Trans Jogja, serves Lines 1A, 1B, 3A, 3B, 5B, and K3-Teman Bus.

| Type | Route | Destination |
|---|---|---|
| Trans Jogja | 1B | Adisutjipto Airport–Pasar Pathuk |
| Trans Jogja | 3A | Adisutjipto Airport–Ngabean Bus Terminal |
| Trans Jogja | 3B | Giwangan Bus Terminal–Condongcatur Bus Terminal |
| Trans Jogja | 5B | Jombor Bus Terminal–Adisutjipto Airport |
| Trans Jogja | 14 | Adisutjipto Airport–Pakem Bus Terminal |
| Teman Bus Yogyakarta | 1A | Prambanan Bus Terminal–Malioboro (Smart Adisutjipto Airport) |

== Gallery ==
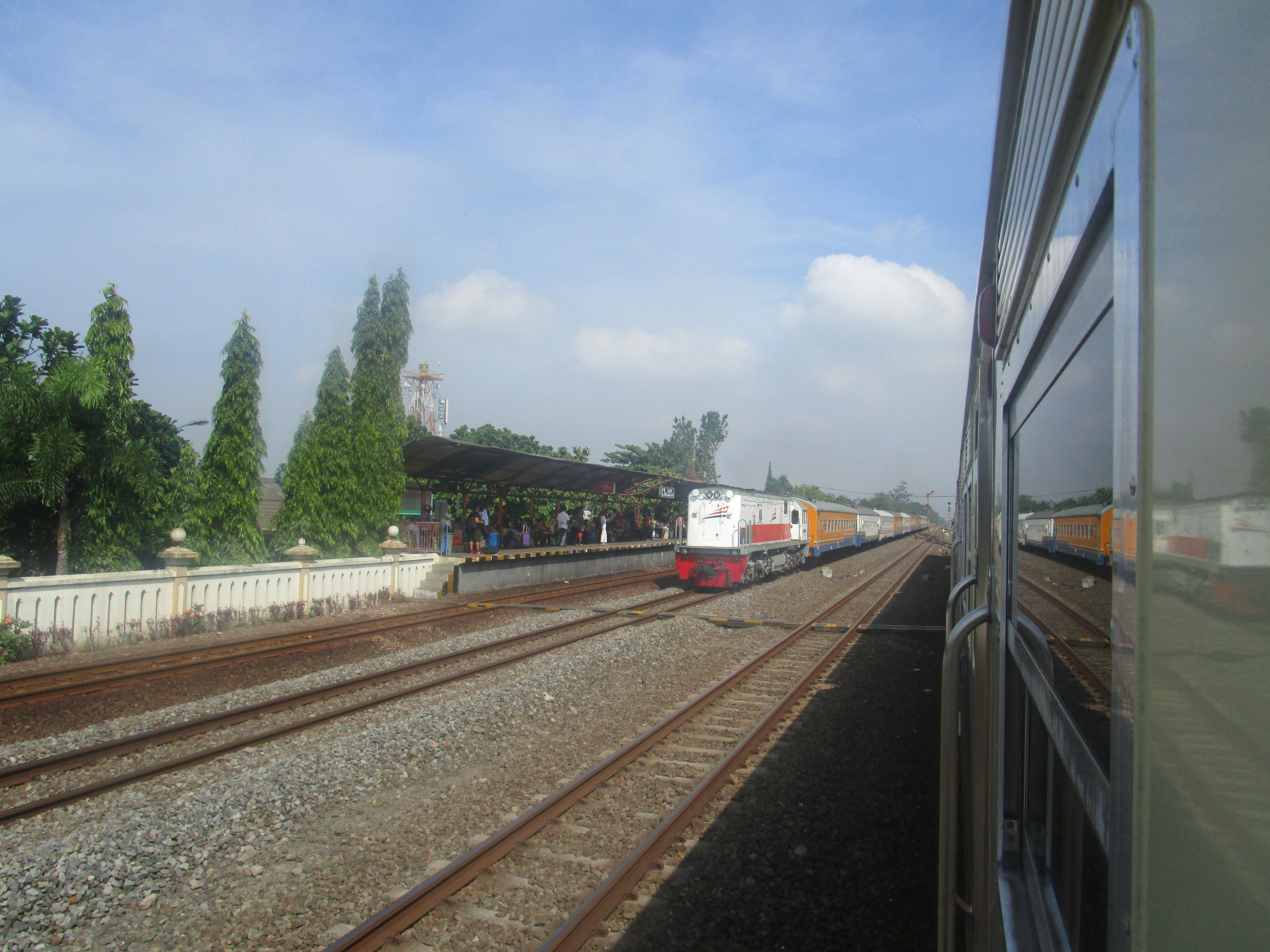
Logawa train bound for Jember directly pass-through Maguwo Station

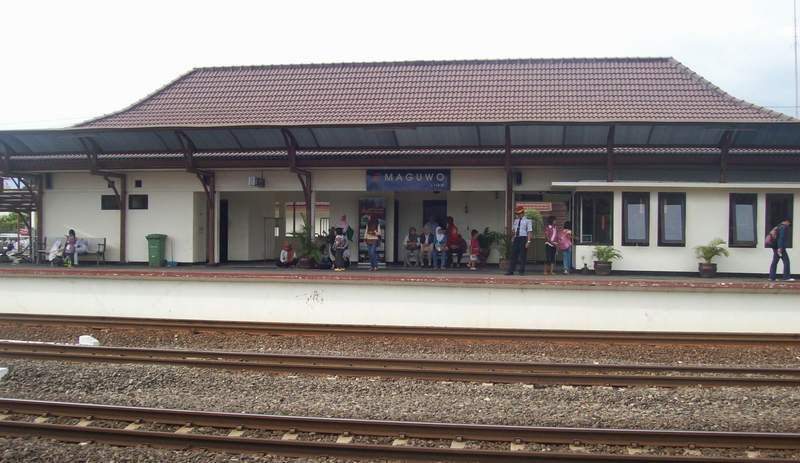
The station's new building in 2010

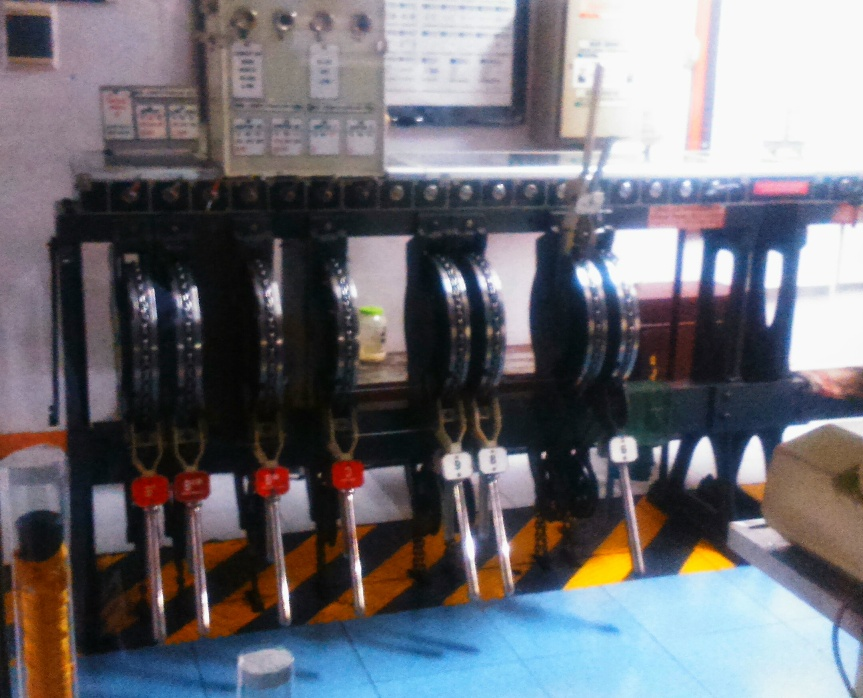
A mechanical switch lever that is no longer used since 1 October 2018

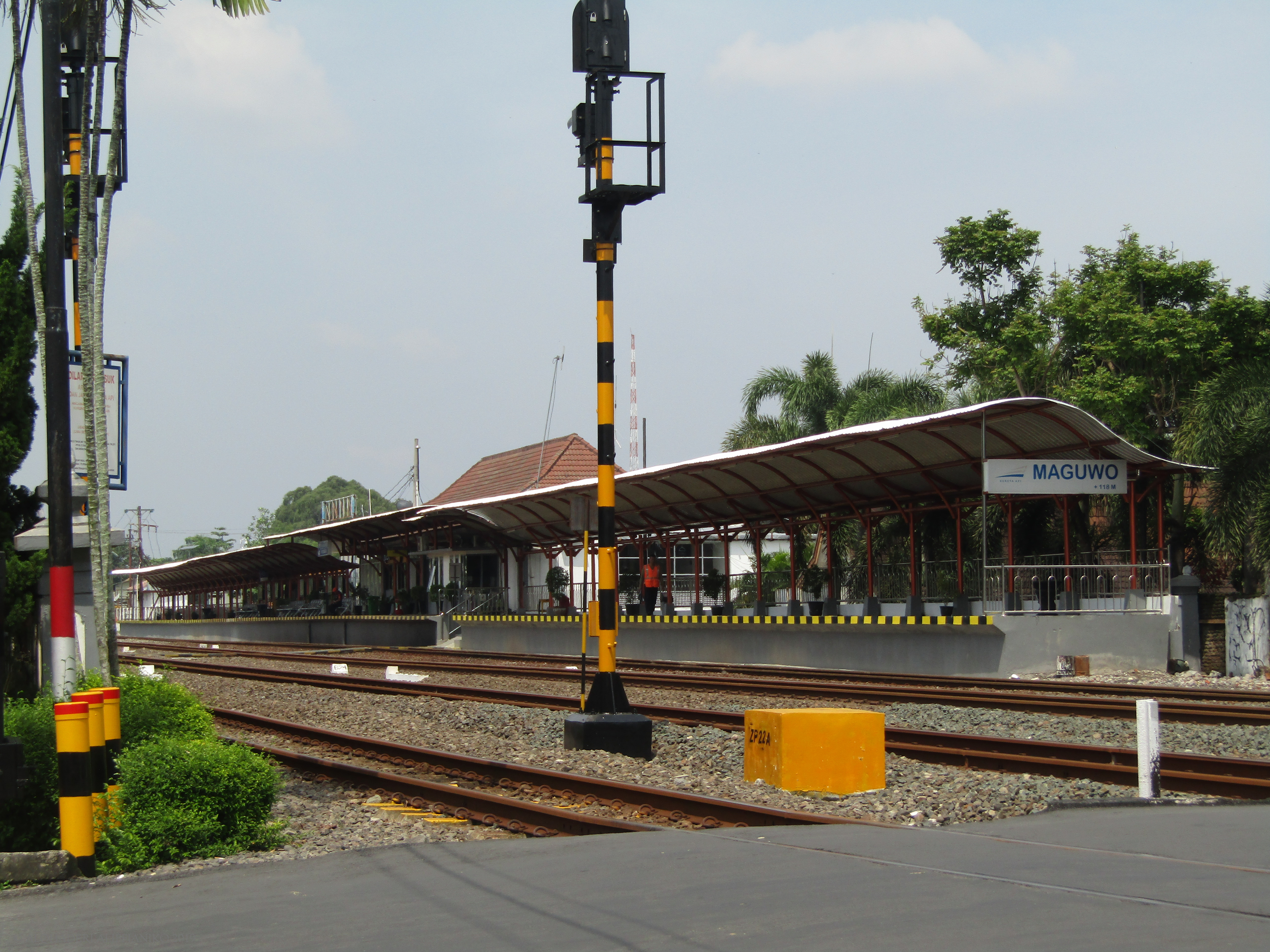
The station yard in 2019, prior to electrification

| Preceding station | Kereta Api Indonesia | Following station |
|---|---|---|
| Lempuyangan towards Kutoarjo | Kutoarjo–Purwosari | Kalasan towards Purwosari |
