= Beringharjo =

Market in Indonesia

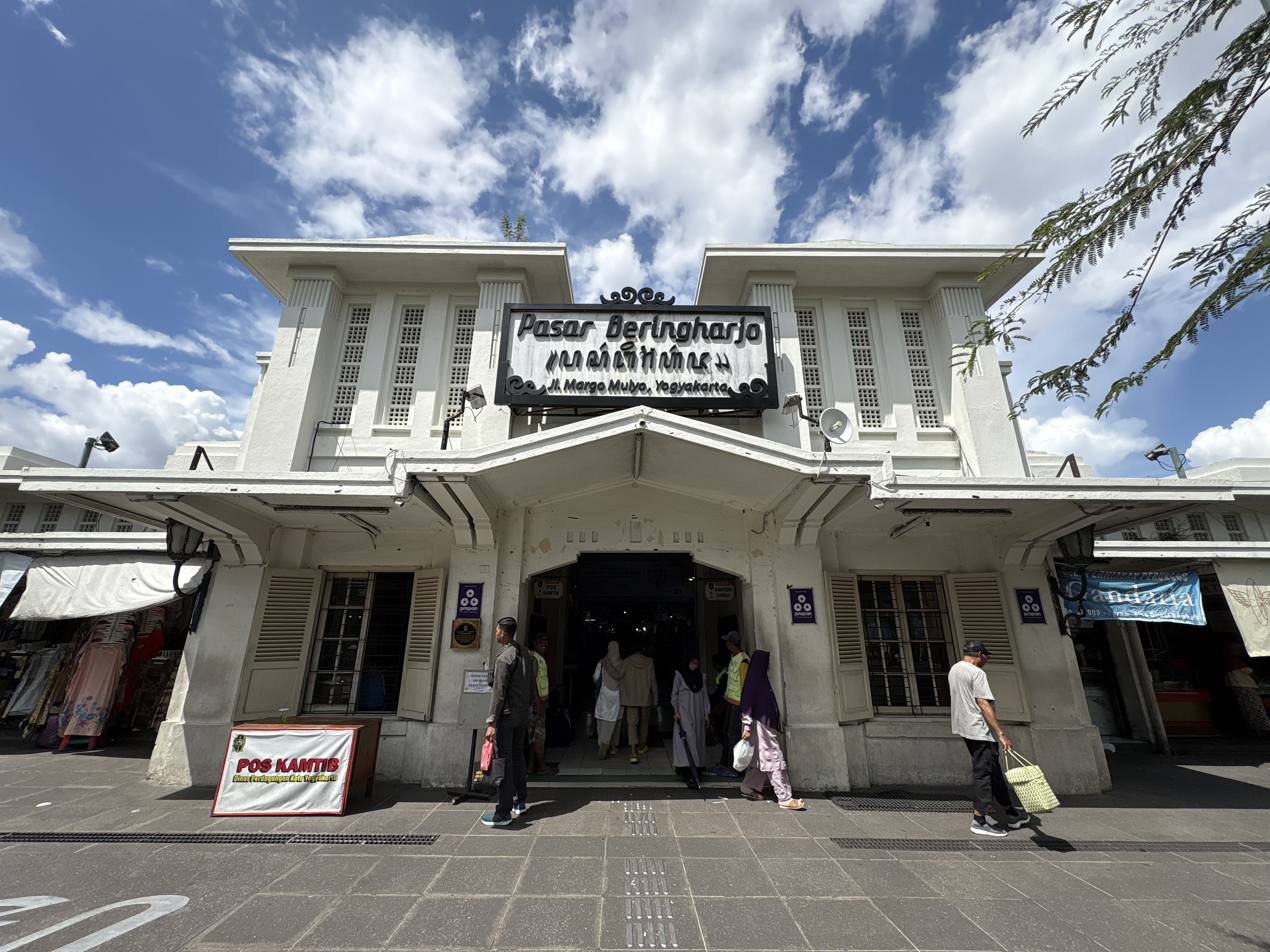
Entrance of the Beringharjo Market in 2025

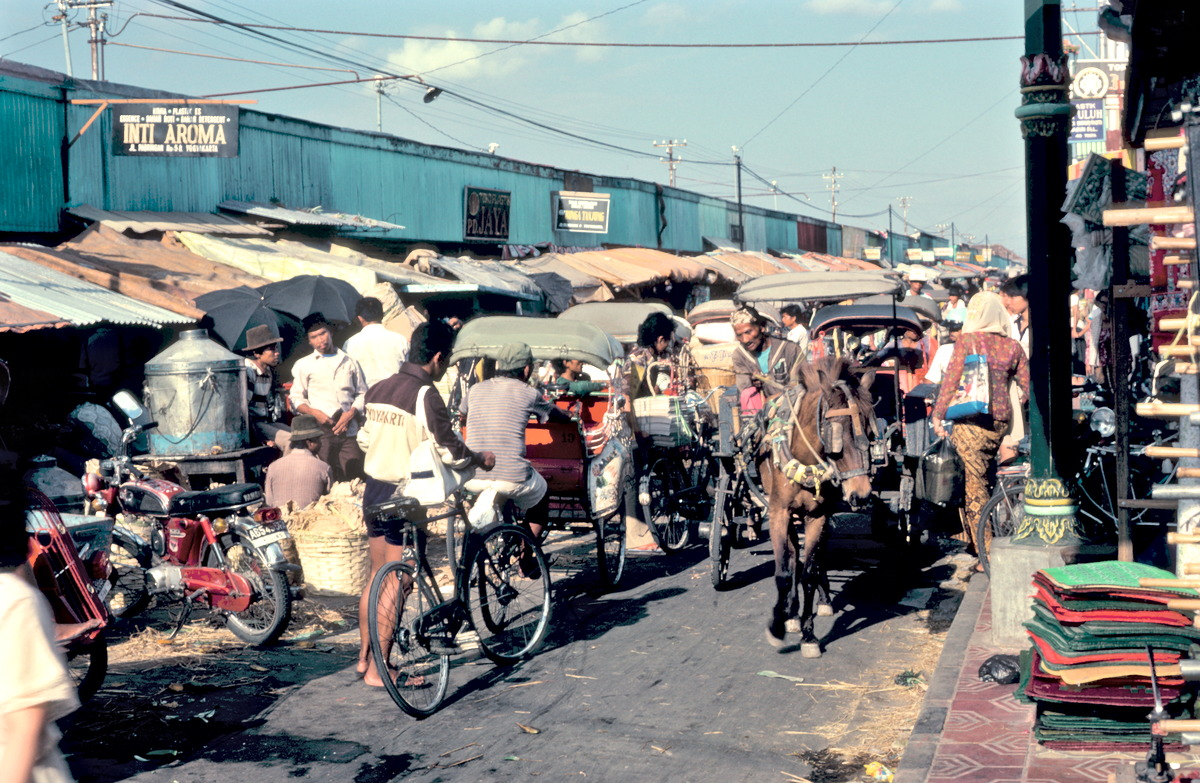
Beringharjo Market in 1985

The Beringharjo Market (Indonesian: Pasar Beringharjo, Javanese: ꦥꦱꦂꦧꦼꦫꦶꦁꦲꦂꦗ, romanized: Pasar Beringharja) is the oldest market in the Kraton area of Yogyakarta, Indonesia, having been a continuous place of trade since 1758. Right off of the main street Jalan Malioboro, Beringharjo Market is officially located on Jalan Margo Mulyo No. 16, Yogyakarta.

The word beringharjo literally means "banyan tree forest", a reference to the former trees that occupied the land, as well as to the notion that the market was expected to provide welfare for Yogyakarta residents. The stalls at Beringharjo Market sell a variety of goods, including batik, clothing, souvenirs, fast food, jajan pasar (market snacks), basic ingredients, household items, jamu (traditional herbal medicine), and antiques.

== History ==
The Beringharjo area was originally a banyan forest. Not long after the establishment of the Kraton in 1758, the area began to be used for transactions by residents of Yogyakarta and the surrounding areas. On 24 March 1925, the Keraton tasked the Nederlandsch Indisch Beton Maatschappij (Dutch East Indies Concrete Company) with building market stalls, and by the end of August 1925, eleven had been installed, with and others soon following. By the end of March 1926, the construction of an Art Deco architectural market was complete, and began to be used a month after that.

The market was originally known as Pasar Gedhe (Javanese: "[The] Large Market"), so called as it was the biggest in Yogyakarta at that time, as well as the only one on the main road area stretching from the Kraton to the Tugu. During the Dutch colonial era, Pasar Gedhe was also nicknamed Passer Op van Java, or "the most beautiful market in Java".
