= Grand Hotel De Djokja =

Historic hotel in Yogyakarta, Indonesia

- The hotel in 2019

- Location in Yogyakarta
- Former names: Hotel Asahi; Hotel Merdeka; Natour Hotel Garuda; Inna Garuda; Grand Inna Malioboro

General information
- Location: Yogyakarta, Special Region of Yogyakarta, Jalan Malioboro, Indonesia
- Coordinates: 7.7906088058013125°S 110.3666980018198°E
- Opening: 15 September 1912
- Owner: Government of Indonesia (Ministry of State-Owned Enterprises)
- Operator: Injourney Hospitality

Technical details
- Floor count: 7

Other information
- Parking: Available

Website
- https://www.dedjokja.com/

The Grand Hotel De Djokja (Dutch for 'Grand Hotel of Yogya') is a historic colonial hotel in Yogyakarta, Special Region of Yogyakarta, Indonesia. Established in 1911 and opened a year later, the hotel name was changed when the Japanese Empire came to Yogyakarta as Hotel Asahi, then it was later known as the Hotel Merdeka, Natour Hotel Garuda, Inna Garuda, and Grand Inna Malioboro before reverting to its original name in 2026. It contains 223 rooms. The hotel was once effectively the de facto headquarters for the government and a Christian stronghold. The hotel is a part of Injourney Hospitality/Hotel Indonesia Group chain, a subsidiary of state-owned tourism holding company InJourney.

== Gallery ==
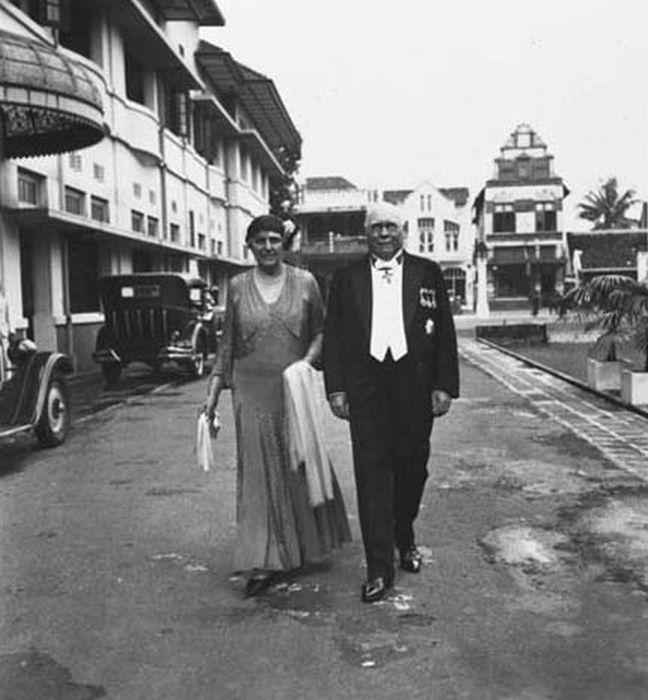
The Grand Hotel de Djokja in 1933

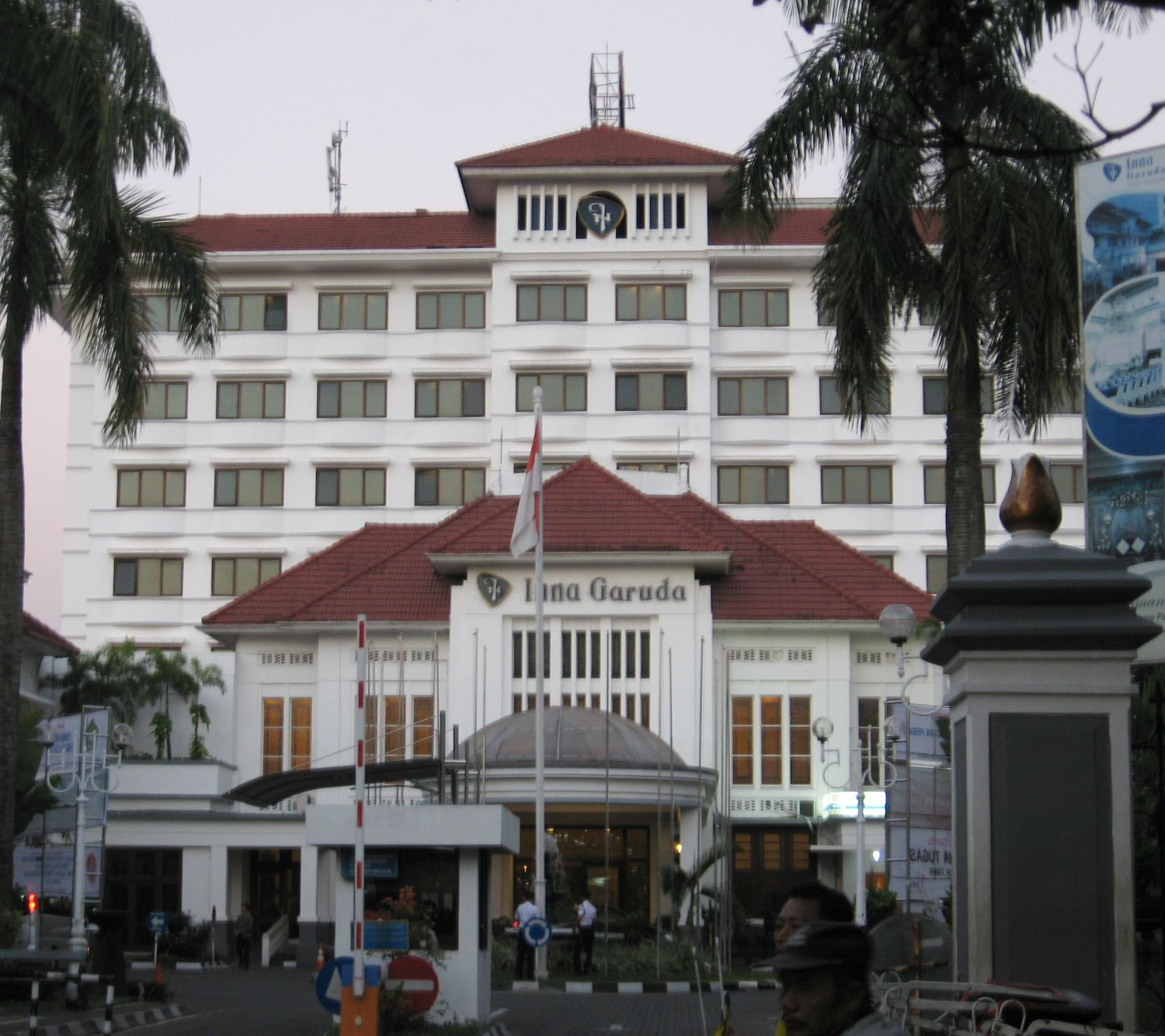
The hotel in 2012, still bearing the name "Inna Garuda"
