= Trans Jogja =

Bus rapid transit in Indonesia

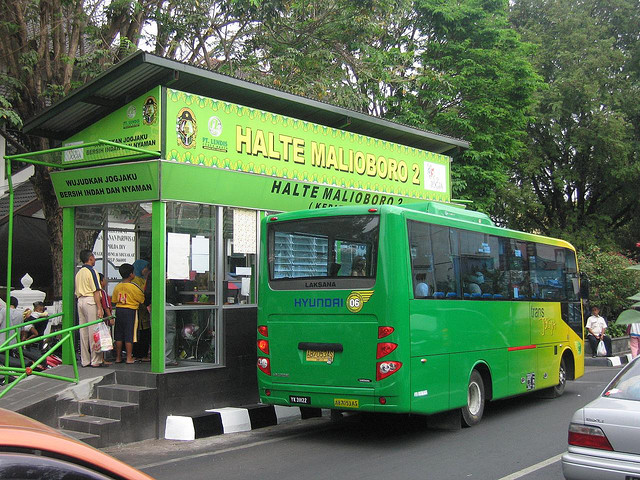
- Trans Jogja bus at Malioboro 2 bus shelter

Overview
- Locale: Special Region of Yogyakarta, Indonesia
- Transit type: Bus rapid transit
- Number of lines: 20
- Number of stations: 458
- Daily ridership: 29,378 (2025)
- Annual ridership: 10,723,117 (2025)
- Website: http://dishub.jogjaprov.go.id/trans-jogja

Operation
- Began operation: 18 February 2008; 18 years ago
- Operators: PT Jogja Tugu Trans; PT Anindya Mitra International
- Number of vehicles: 128 (Trans Jogja)

Trans Jogja is a bus rapid transit (BRT) system that operates in Yogyakarta and surrounding areas (Sleman Regency and Bantul Regency), with 20 different routes. Trans Jogja operates from 05:30 to 20:30.

Trans Jogja inaugurated on 18 February 2008. It makes it the second oldest bus rapid transit (BRT) system that operates in Indonesia, after Transjakarta.

Trans Jogja is currently operated by PT Jogja Tugu Trans, a consortium of Perum DAMRI and public transport cooperatives in Special Region of Yogyakarta (Koperasi Pemuda Sleman, Kopata, Aspada, Kobutri, and Puskopkar), and PT Anindya Mitra Internasional, a province-owned company. Their operations are under auspices of Office of Transportation of the Special Region of Yogyakarta.

In April 2020, the system had a daily ridership of 1,402, lower than normal amounts of 20,000-22,000 because of the COVID-19 pandemic.

== Fares ==
Ticket fares on Trans Jogja are of flat rates. Passengers pay a flat fare and can go any distance along the bus route. Bus transfers are free at staffed stops.

Table of Trans Jogja Istimewa Payment Methods
Payment Method		Fare
Cash		Rp3.500
Trans Jogja Subscription Card	Regular Card	Rp2.700
Trans Jogja Subscription Card	Student Card	Rp500
Special Card	Senior Card	Rp2.000
Special Card	Disabled Card	Rp2.000
Electronic Money Card (KUE)	Mandiri e-money	Rp2.700
Electronic Money Card (KUE)	BCA Flazz	Rp2.700
Electronic Money Card (KUE)	BRIZZI	Rp2.700
Electronic Money Card (KUE)	BNI TapCash	Rp2.700
Electronic Money Card (KUE)	Multi Trip Card/KMT KAI Commuter	Rp2.700
Digital Wallet	Gopay	Rp2.700
Digital Wallet	Astrapay	Rp2.700
Digital Wallet	LinkAja	Rp2.700
Digital Wallet	QRIS	Rp2.700

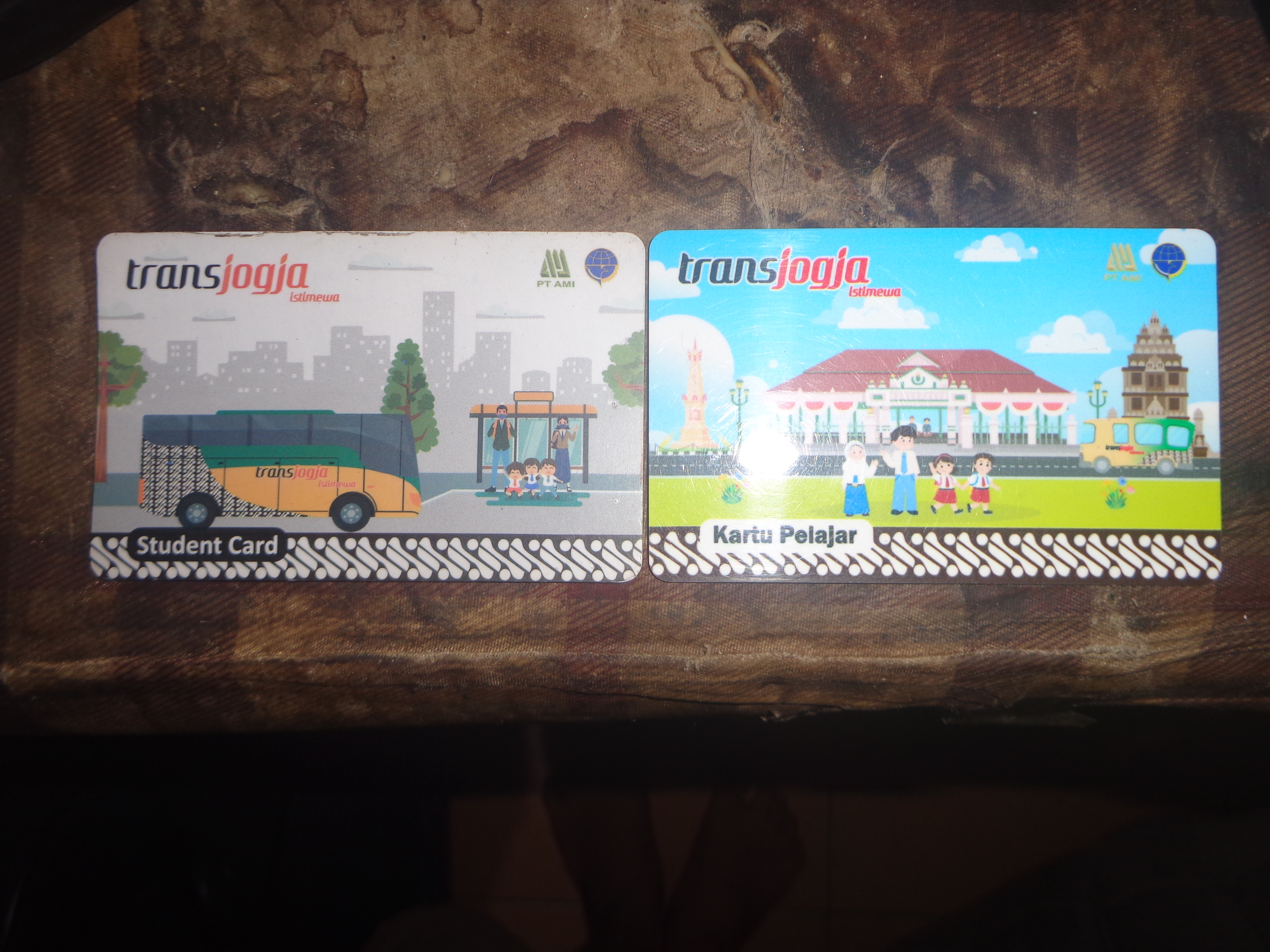
Old and new versions of the Student Card

=== Cards ===
As of 2025, Trans Jogja issues Trans Jogja subscription cards for use on Trans Jogja buses. There are four types of cards:

- Regular Card: This card can be purchased for Rp50,000 with a balance of Rp50,000. It can also be reloaded with a minimum of Rp5,000 per reload.
- Student Card: This card can only be obtained by showing a student ID from elementary school, middle school, high school, or equivalent. The new card price is Rp50,000 with a balance of Rp50,000.
- Disabled Card: This card can only be obtained by showing the buyer's identification card, such as a National Identity Card (KTP). This card can be purchased for Rp50,000 with a balance of Rp50,000.
- Senior Card: This card can only be obtained by showing the buyer's identification card, such as a National Identity Card (KTP) or Family Card (KK). The new card price is Rp50,000 with a balance of Rp50,000.

Regular Card, Student Card, Disabled Card, and Senior Card can be purchased and reloaded at the following point-of-sale (POS) bus stops:

- Adisutjipto Airport Bus Stop
- Jombor Terminal Bus Stop
- Ambarrukmo Plaza Bus Stop
- Taman Pintar Bus Stop
- Giwangan Terminal Bus Stop
- Palbapang Terminal Bus Stop
- Pakem Terminal Bus Stop
- PT Anindya Mitra Internasional

=== Jogja Travel Pass (JTP) ===
Jogja Travel Pass (JTP) is a durational ticket pass that user can using every Trans Jogja route only one time payment. The system look like Opal Travel Pass in Sydney and Japan Rail Pass in Japan. The different with Trans Jogja normal payment system is JTP make user can going out from Trans Jogja to explore Jogja or activity in Jogja, but if that user come back using Trans Jogja, user do not pay ticket again.

To using Jogja Travel Pass, user can buy Jogja Travel Pass in Trans Jogja Apps. There are many choise of duration Jogja Travel Pass, from 1 day, 3 days, 7 days, and 14 days. After that, user can pay using Credit Card, Debit Card, QRIS, or Virtual Account. After payment success, user gifted QR Code in the app that use for scanning by crew every user using Trans Jogja.

Jogja Travel Pass has reward to user in the form of point. User can convert much of point into discount travel destination ticket from destination that have cooperation with Trans Jogja.

Here is Jogja Travel Pass ticket fares:

JTP Fares
Duration	Fares
1 day	Rp 6.500
3 days	Rp 15.000
7 days	Rp 32.000
14 days	Rp 57.000

== Routes ==
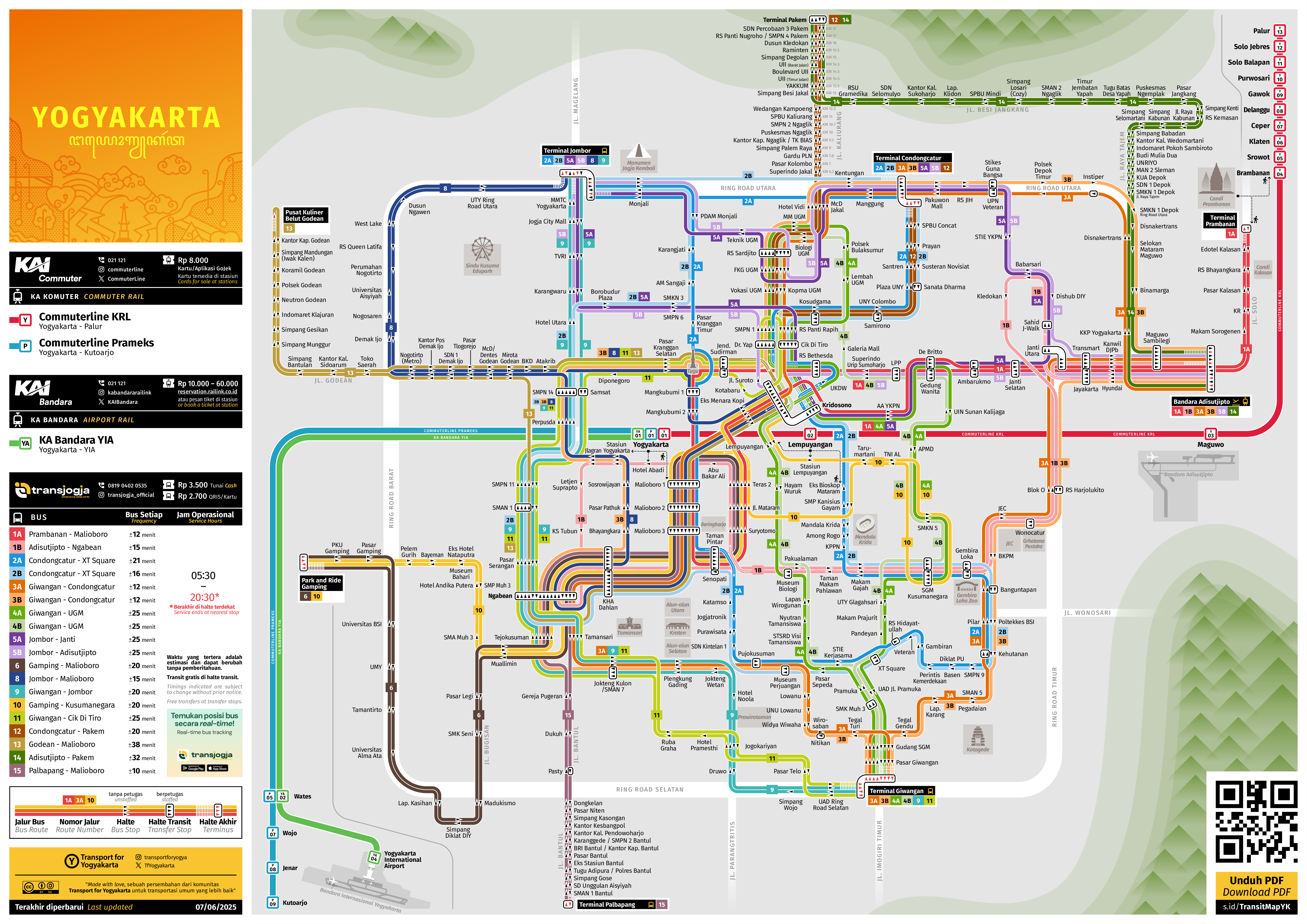
Public Transportation Map of Yogyakarta, Last updated June 7, 2025

List of Trans Jogja routes
Service	Line	Route	Route type	Headway (minute)	Operating hours	Operator
Trans Jogja	L-1	Jombor - Malioboro	Loop	-	05.30 - 20:30	PT Anindya Mitra Internasional
Trans Jogja	1A	Prambanan - Malioboro	Loop	12	05.30 - 20:30	PT Jogja Tugu Trans
Trans Jogja	1B	Adisutjipto Airport – Yogyakarta railway station	Loop	15	05.30 - 20:30	PT Jogja Tugu Trans
Trans Jogja	2A	Condongcatur – XT Square	Loop	21	05.30 - 20:30	PT Jogja Tugu Trans
Trans Jogja	2B	Condongcatur – XT Square	Loop	16	05.30 - 20:30	PT Jogja Tugu Trans
Trans Jogja	3A	Giwangan – Condongcatur	Loop	12	05.30 - 20:30	PT Jogja Tugu Trans
Trans Jogja	3B	Giwangan – Condongcatur	Loop	15	05.30 - 20:30	PT Anindya Mitra Internasional
Trans Jogja	4A	Giwangan – UGM	Loop	25	05.30 - 20:30	PT Anindya Mitra Internasional
Trans Jogja	4B	Giwangan – UGM	Loop	25	05.30 - 20:30	PT Anindya Mitra Internasional
Trans Jogja	5A	Jombor – Janti	Loop	25	05.30 - 20:30	PT Anindya Mitra Internasional
Trans Jogja	5B	Jombor – Adisutjipto Airport	Loop	25	05.30 - 20:30	PT Anindya Mitra Internasional
Trans Jogja	6	Gamping – Malioboro	Two-way	25	05.30 - 20:30	PT Anindya Mitra Internasional
Trans Jogja	8	Jombor – Ngabean	Two-way	15	05.30 - 20:30	PT Anindya Mitra Internasional
Trans Jogja	9	Giwangan – Jombor	Two-way	20	05.30 - 20:30	PT Anindya Mitra Internasional
Trans Jogja	10	Gamping – SGM (Kusumanegara)	Two-way	20	05.30 - 20:30	PT Anindya Mitra Internasional
Trans Jogja	11	Giwangan – Panti Rapih	Two-way	25	05.30 - 20:30	PT Anindya Mitra Internasional
Trans Jogja	12	Condongcatur – Pakem	Two-way	20	05.30 - 20:30	PT Jogja Tugu Trans
Trans Jogja	13	Ngabean - Pusat Kuliner Belut	Two-way	38	05.30 - 20:30	PT Jogja Tugu Trans
Trans Jogja	14	Adisutjipto Airport - Pakem	Two-way	32	05.30 - 20:30	PT Jogja Tugu Trans
Trans Jogja	15	Malioboro - Palbapang	Two-way	10		PT Jogja Tugu Trans

=== Intermodal Integration ===
Trans Jogja has many intermodal integration location. Here is the location of intermodal integration:

Location	Trans Jogja Line	Transport Intermodal
Yogyakarta railway station	1A, 1B, 2A, 3A, 3B, 6, 8, 10, 13, 15, L-1	Intercity Train Prambanan Express Commuter Line KRL Commuter Line Yogyakarta - Solo Yogyakarta International Airport Rail Link
Lempuyangan railway station	2B, 4A, 4B, 10	Intercity Train KRL Commuter Line Yogyakarta - Solo
Maguwo Shelter	1A, 1B, 3A, 3B, 5B, 14	KRL Commuter Line Yogyakarta - Solo Adisutjipto Airport Park and ride
Giwangan Bus Station	3A, 3B, 4A, 4B, 9, 11	Intercity Bus (especially from/to Surabaya, Denpasar, Jakarta) Park and ride
Jombor Bus Station	2A, 2B, 5A, 5B, 8, 9, L-1	Intercity Bus (especially from/to Magelang, Semarang, Jakarta) Travel / Shuttle (especially from/to Magelang, Semarang)
Titik Nol	1A, 1B, 2A, 2B, 3A, 6, 8, 10, 13, 15, L-1	KSPN Shuttle (to Borobudur, Parangtritis, Baron)
Gamping Shelter	6, 10	DAMRI YIA Airport Shuttle Intercity Bus (especially from/to Purwokerto, Cilacap, Bandung) Park and ride
North Janti & South Janti Shelter	1A, 1B, 3A, 5A, 5B	Intercity Bus (especially from/to Surabaya)
Prambanan Shelter	1A	Intercity Bus KSPN Shuttle

== Ridership ==
Number of Trans Jogja Passengers per Year
Year		2013	2014	2015	2016	2017	2018	2019	2020	2021	2022	2023	2024
Number of Passengers	Trans Jogja	5,978,726	6,506,290	6,468,678	6,409,205	5,317,484	5,880,610	5,282,737	2,776,667	1,508,450	3,045,957	5,465,574	8,984,984
Number of Passengers	Daily	16,380	17,825	17,722	17,511	14,568	16,111	14,473	7,587	4,132	8,345	13,825	25,549

== Fleets ==
All of Trans Jogja fleets consist of medium buses.

List of Trans Jogja current fleets
Vehicle number	Number of fleet	Chassis	Body	Livery	Lines	Year in operation	Photo
EV-01, EV-02	2	MD8-E LE City Bus	New Armada	Purple	L-1	2025 – present	
41; 70-73; 128	6	Hino FB 130	Restu Ibu Pusaka Grand Venus	Yellow-Green	Backup bus	2019 – present	
86-113	28	Hino FB 130	Laksana Nucleus 4	Yellow-Green	6A, 6B, 7, 8, 9, 10, 11, Backup bus	2017 – present	
21-30; 36-40; 114-127	29	Hino FB 130	Restu Ibu Pusaka Neptune	Yellow-Green	1B, 2B, 12, 13, 14, Backup bus	2017 – present	
42-69; 74-85	40	Isuzu ELF NQR 71	Laksana Nucleus 4	Blue-Yellow	3A, 3B, 4A, 4B, 5A, 5B, 10, Backup bus	2016 – present	
1-25	25	Hino GB 150	Tri Sakti Infinity	Green-Yellow	1A, 1B, 15	2023 – present	
