= Jalan Malioboro =

Major shopping street in Yogyakarta, Indonesia

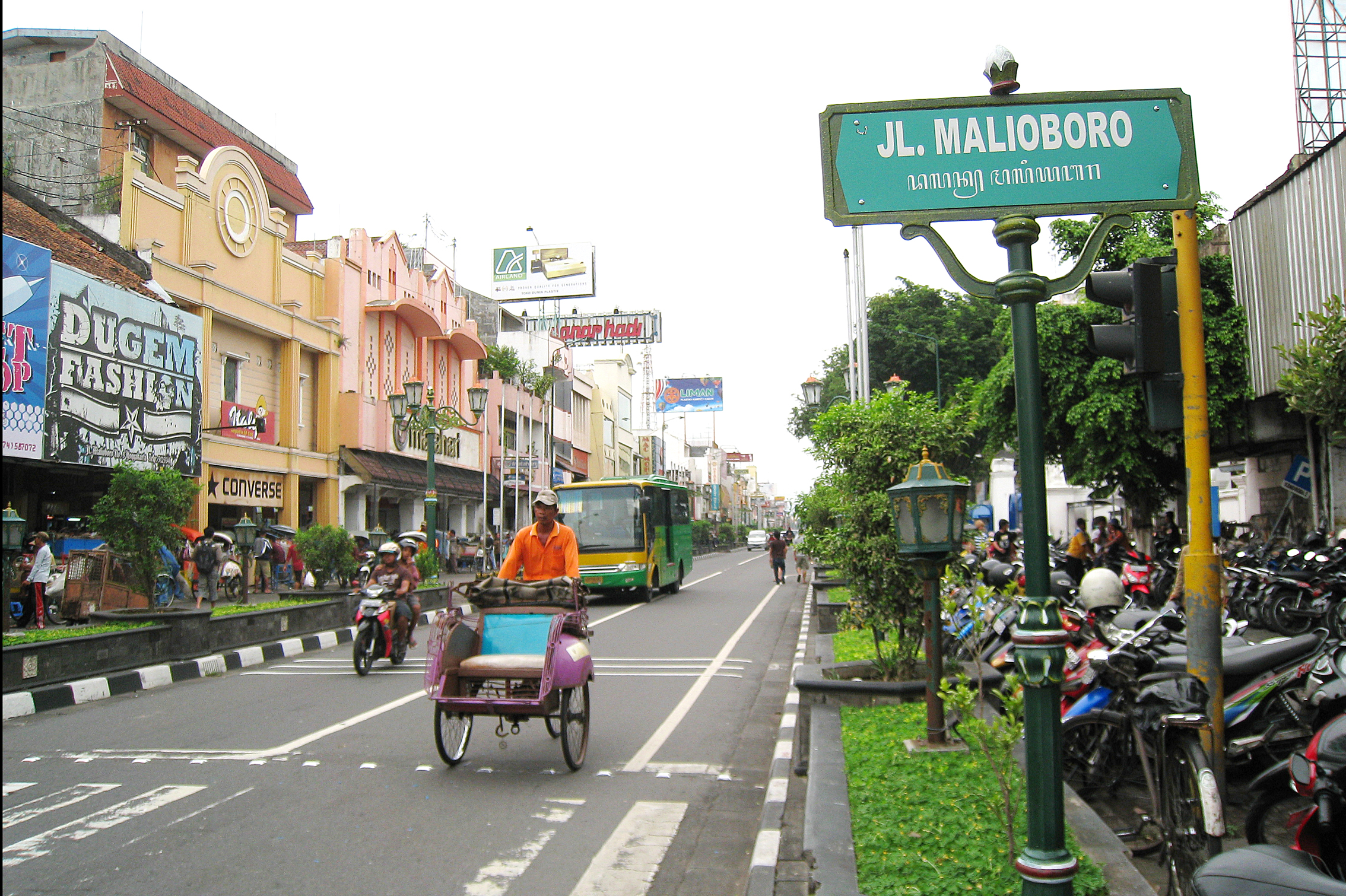
- Malioboro street lined with stores of batik, handycraft, and fashion products
- Interactive map of Jalan Malioboro
- Native name: ꦢꦭꦤ꧀ꦩꦭꦶꦪꦧꦫ (Javanese)
- Maintained by: Office of Transportation (Dinas Perhubungan) of Yogyakarta
- Length: 2.5 km (1.6 mi)
- Location: Yogyakarta, Special Region of Yogyakarta, Indonesia
- Coordinates: 7.793359°S 110.365713°E
- North: Jalan Margo Utomo (Pangeran Mangkubumi)
- South: Jalan Margo Mulyo (Ahmad Yani)

Other
Known for
The Cosmological Axis of Yogyakarta and its Historic Landmarks
UNESCO World Heritage Site
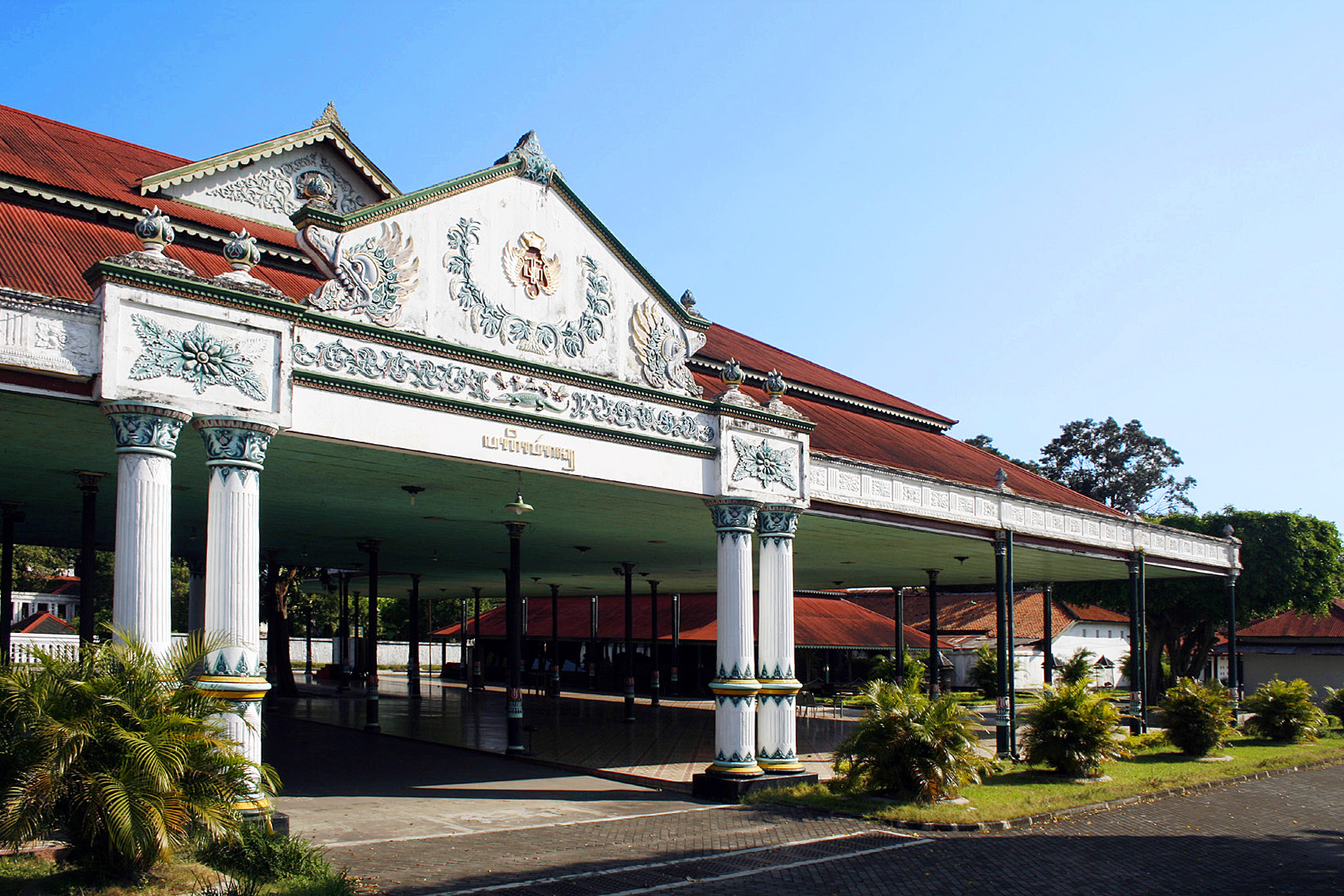
- Pagelaran hall of Kraton Yogyakarta
- Interactive map of The Cosmological Axis of Yogyakarta and its Historic Landmarks
- Criteria: Cultural: ii, iii
- Reference: 1671
- Inscription: 2023 (45th Session)

Jalan Malioboro (Javanese: ꦢꦭꦤ꧀ꦩꦭꦶꦪꦧꦫ, romanized: Dalan Maliyabara, lit. 'Malioboro Street') is a major shopping street in Yogyakarta, Indonesia; the name is also used more generally for the neighborhood around the street. It lies north–south axis in the line between Yogyakarta Kraton and Mount Merapi. This is in itself is significant to many of the local population, the north–south orientation between the palace and the volcano being of importance.

The street is the centre of Yogyakarta's largest tourist district surrounded with many hotels, restaurants, and shops nearby. Sidewalks on both sides of the street are crowded with small stalls selling a variety of goods. In the evening, several open-air street side restaurants, called lesehan, operate along the street. This is the street of the artists. Street musicians, painters, and other artists exhibit their creations on this road.

== Description ==
Jalan Malioboro lies between Tugu Railway Station and the Suryatmajan intersection, which includes Jalan Pajeksan, Jalan Suryatmajan, and Jalan Jenderal Ahmad Yani. Its length is reported differently—736 meters according to Salamun in 1988 and 748.8 meters reported by Faculty of Geography of UGM in 2017—while other accounts describe it as stretching from Tugu Pal Putih in the north to Beringharjo Market in the south.

== History ==
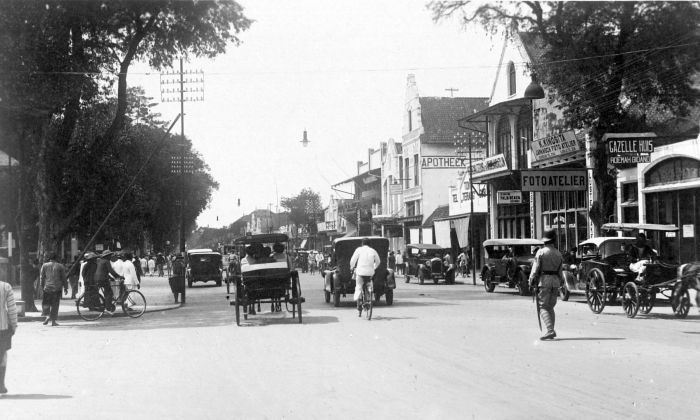
Jalan Malioboro (ca.1900-40)

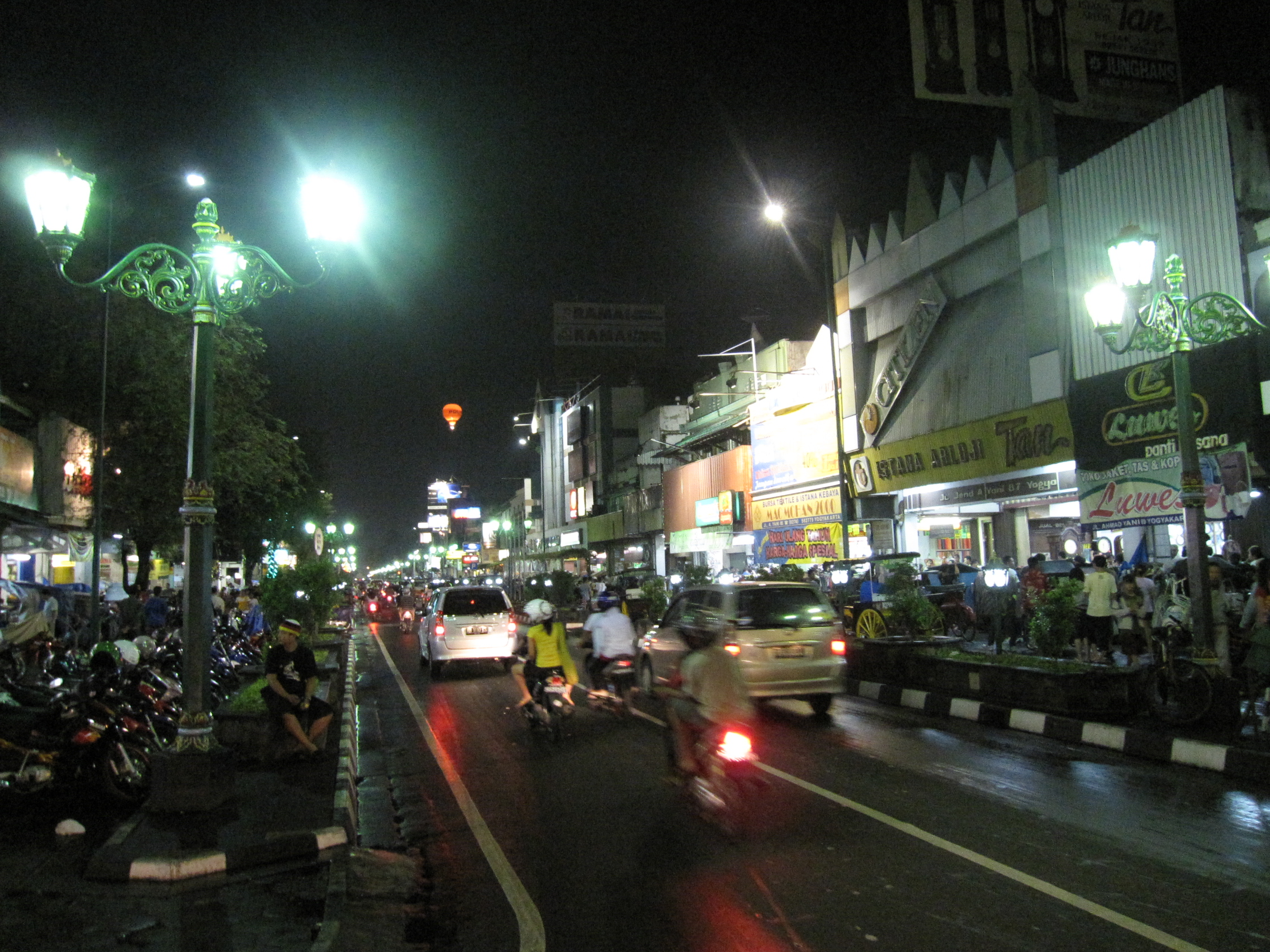
Jalan Malioboro at night

In 1900, Chinese merchants started establishing shops selling daily necessities, gold, and clothing. Since 1916, the southern part of Malioboro had become known as Pecinan. Even a 1925 map identified the southern section beyond the Jalan Dagen intersection and Malioboro as Jalan Pecinan.

The street was for many years two-way, but by the 1980s had become one way only, from the railway line (where it starts) to the south - to Beringharjo market, where it ends. The largest, oldest Dutch era hotel, Grand Hotel De Djokja, is located on the street's northern end, on the eastern side adjacent to the railway line. It has the former Dutch era Prime Minister's complex, the kepatihan, on the eastern side.

For many years in the 1980s and later, a cigarette advertisement was placed on the first building south of the railway line - or effectively the last building on Malioboro, which advertised Marlboro cigarettes, no doubt appealing to locals and foreigners who would see a pun with name of the street with a foreign product being advertised.

It does not reach the walls or grounds of the Yogyakarta palace, as Malioboro ceases in name adjacent to the Beringharjo market (on the eastern side as well). From this point the street changes name to Jalan Ahmad Yani (Ahmad Yani Street, currently Margo Mulyo Street) and has the former Governors residence on the western side, and the old Dutch Fort Vredeburg on the eastern side.

== Malioboro Night Festival ==
The festival held annually along Jalan Malioboro until the Monument of General Offensive of First March. Live music, featured music concert, traditional art show, Jembe Percussion, Kumlaka Ethnic, fashion show and other activities are arranged for Malioboro Night Festival.

== Public transport ==
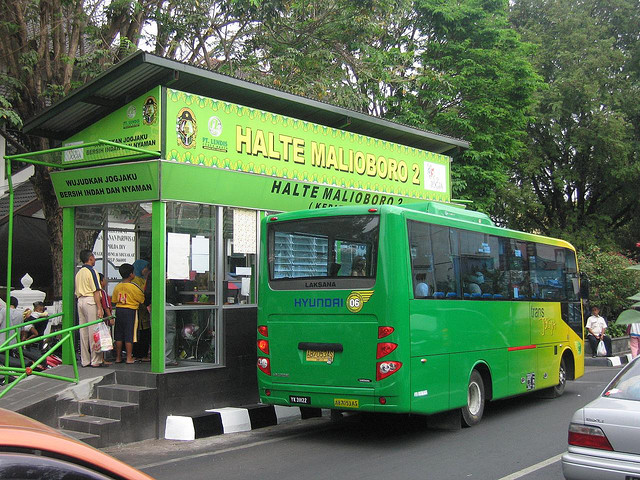
The Malioboro 2 bus station of Trans Jogja in 2008

There are three bus stops along the street (Malioboro 1, Malioboro 2, Malioboro 3), serving various routes of Trans Jogja bus. The northern end of the street is close to Yogyakarta station, serving KAI Commuter's Yogyakarta Line and Prambanan Express commuter trains, as well as intercity trains.

== Landmarks ==
The eastern section of Malioboro serves as an administrative area, housing several key government institutions such as the Governor’s Office (Kepatihan), Bappeda, the Tourism Office, and the DPRD building of Yogyakarta.

== In popular culture ==
Didi Kempot released a song titled "Angin Malioboro" ("Malioboro's Wind").

== Gallery ==
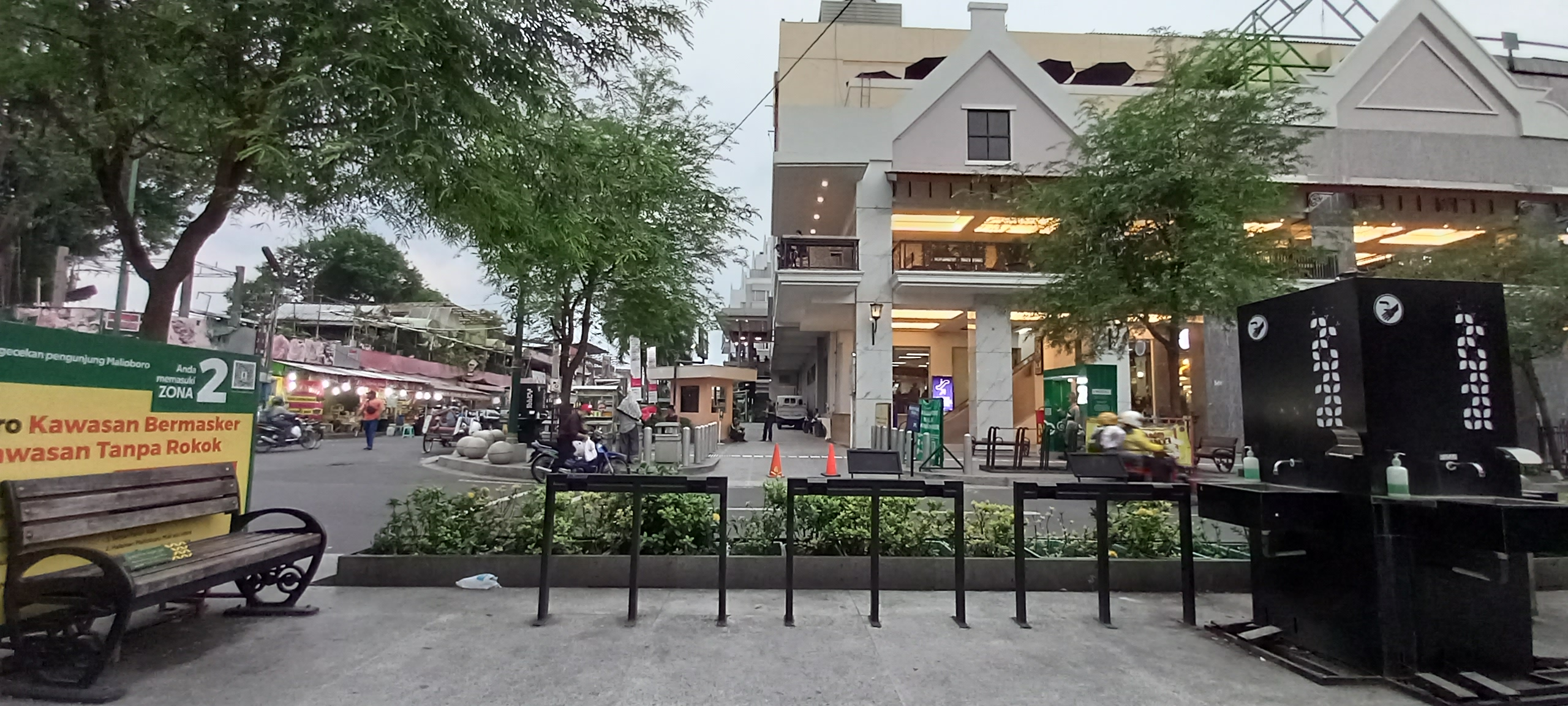

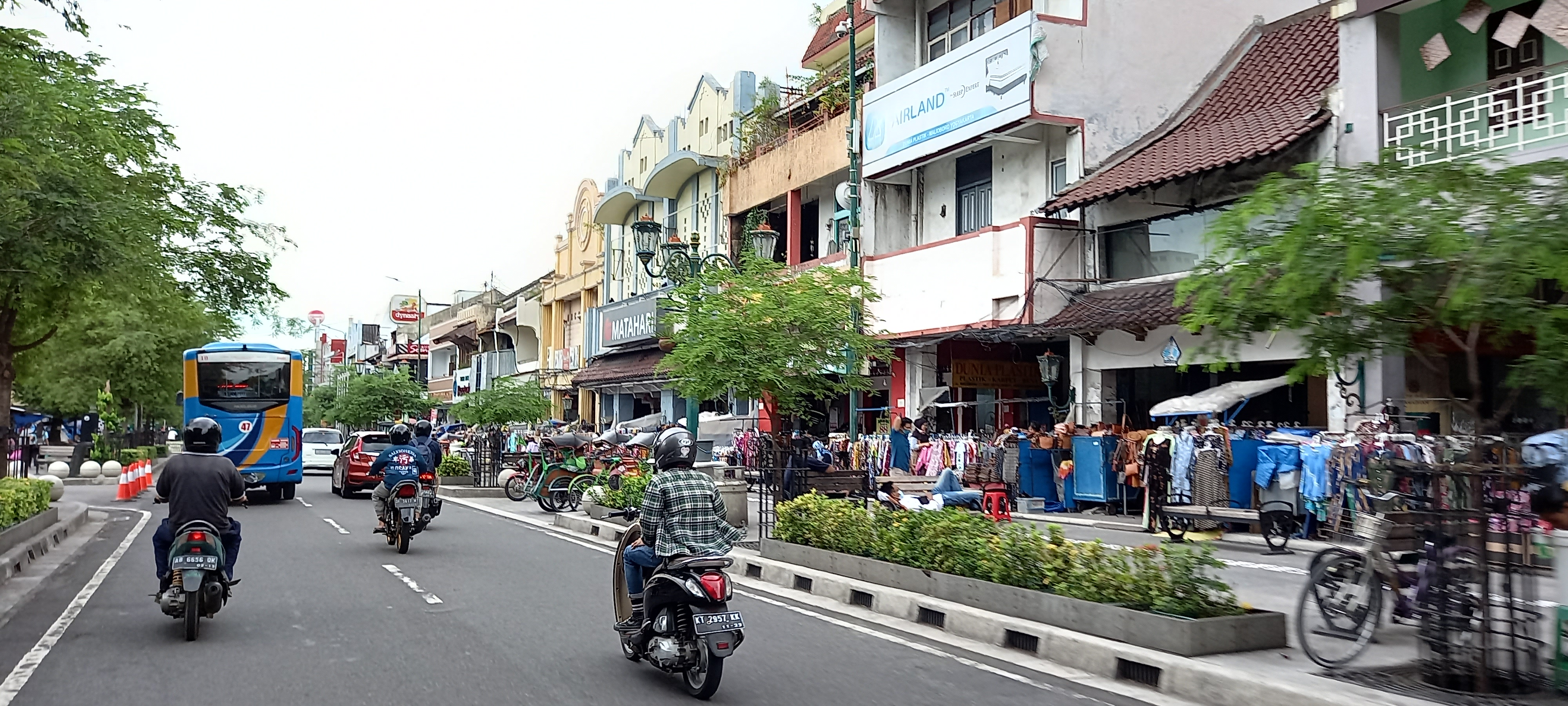

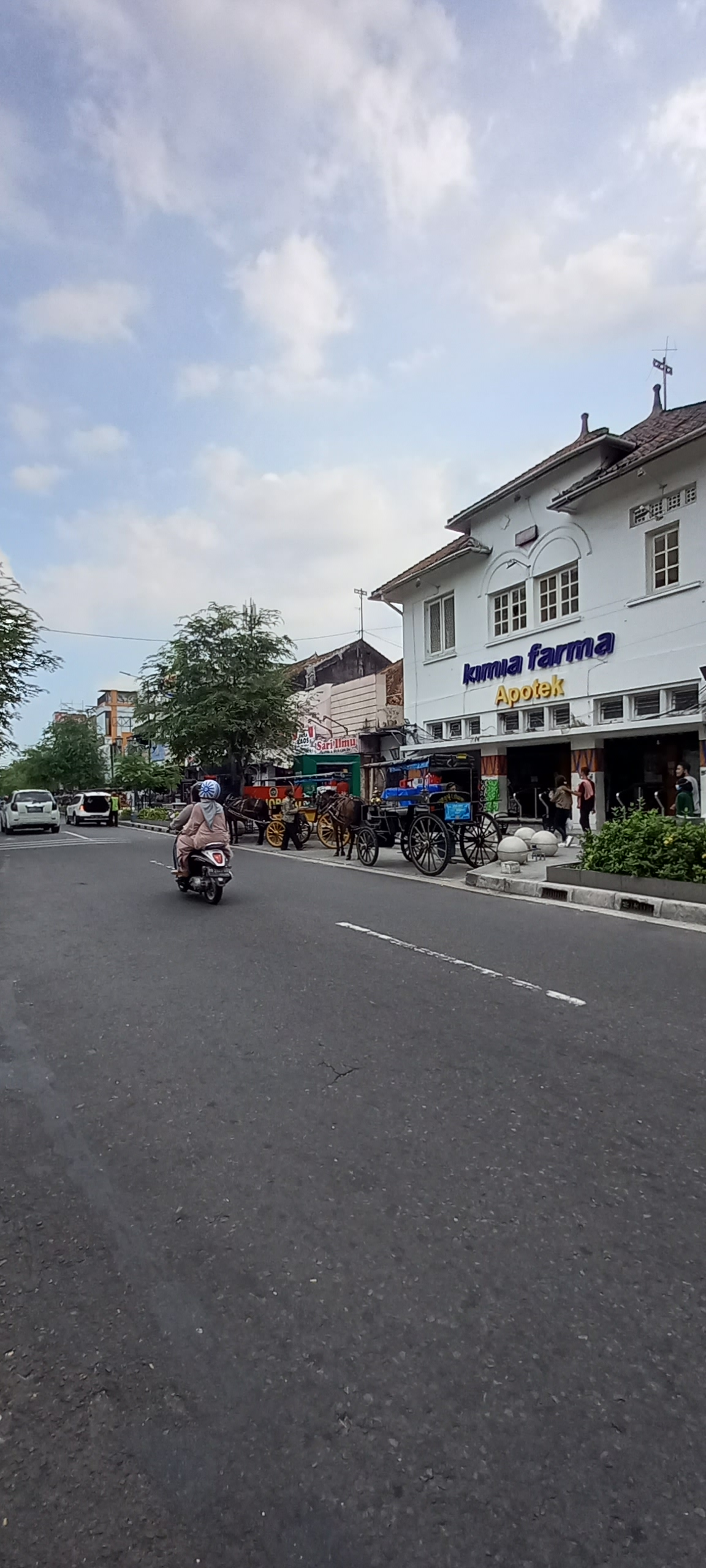

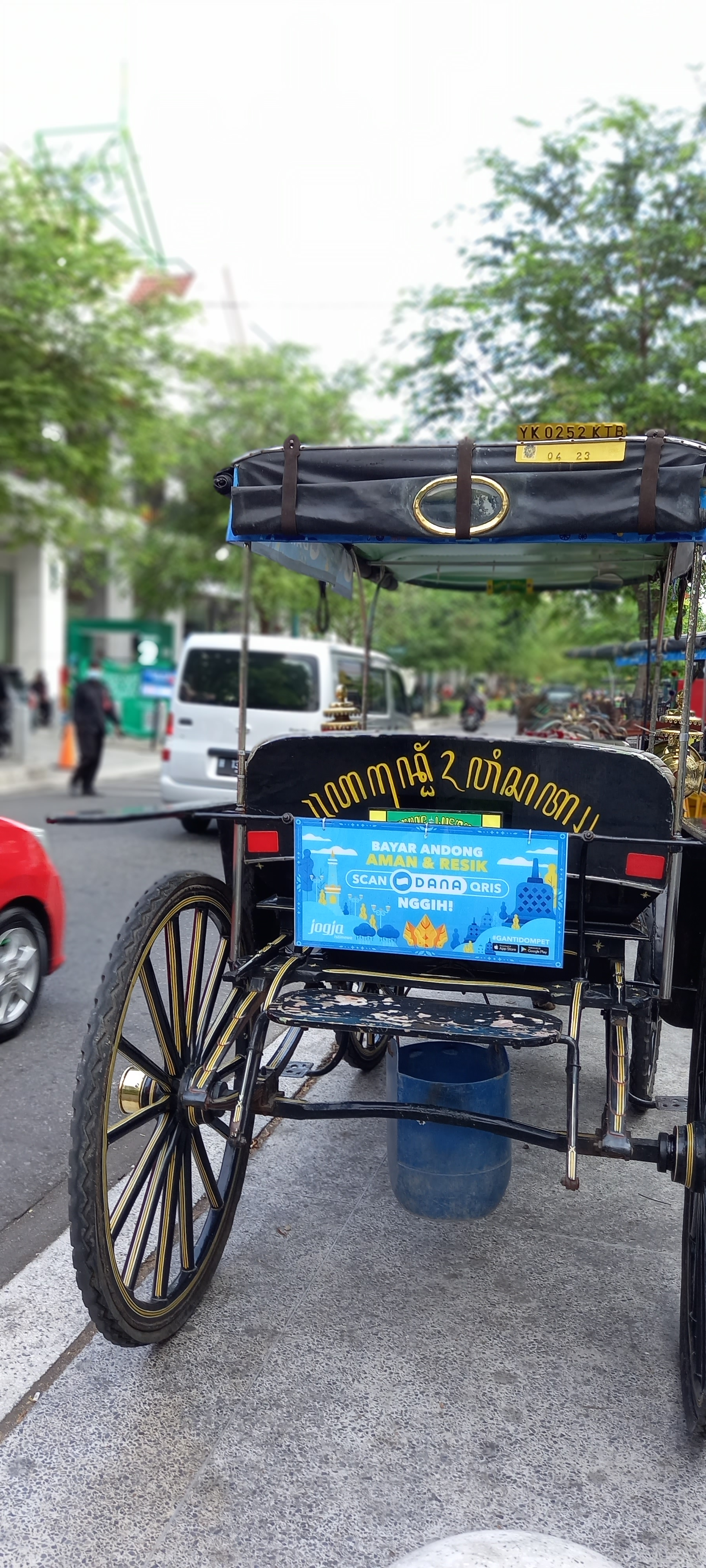

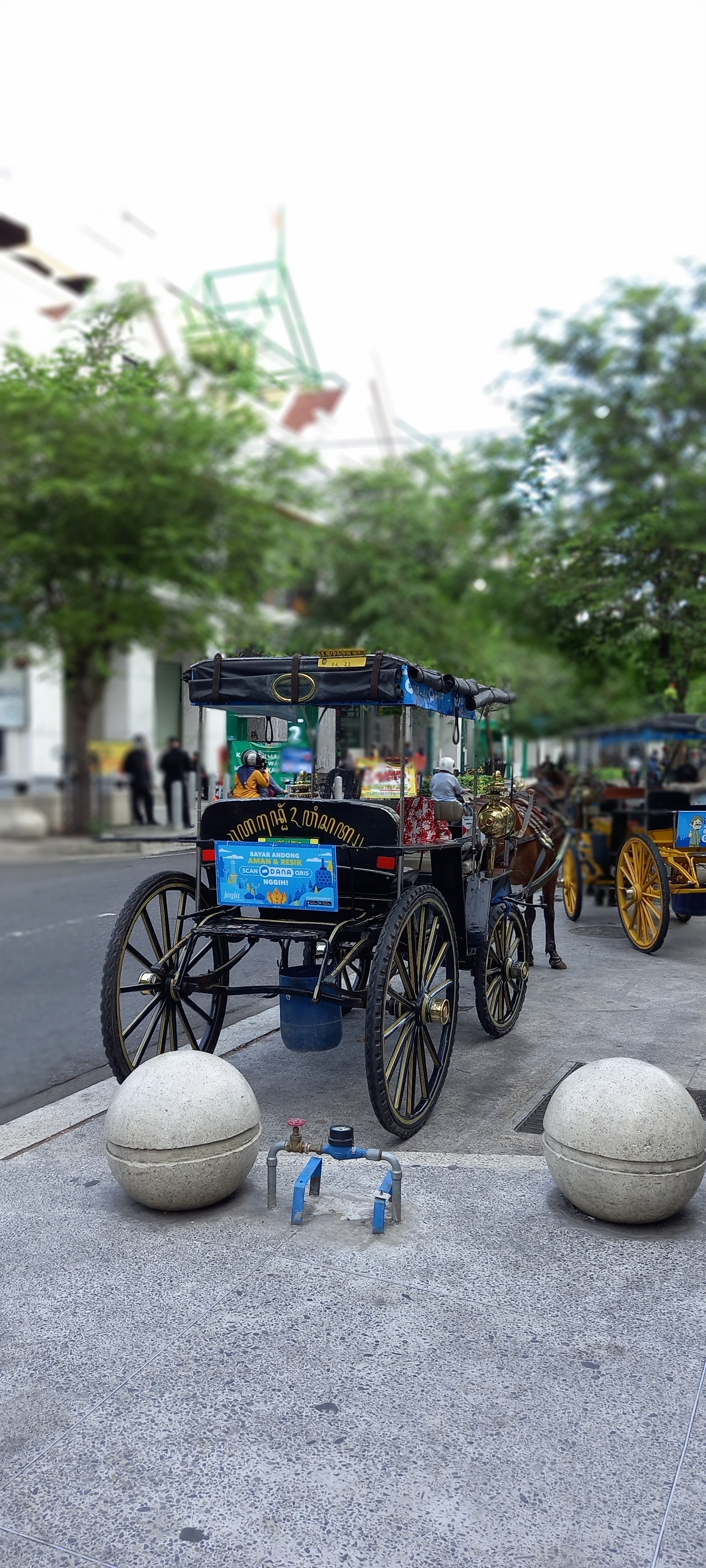

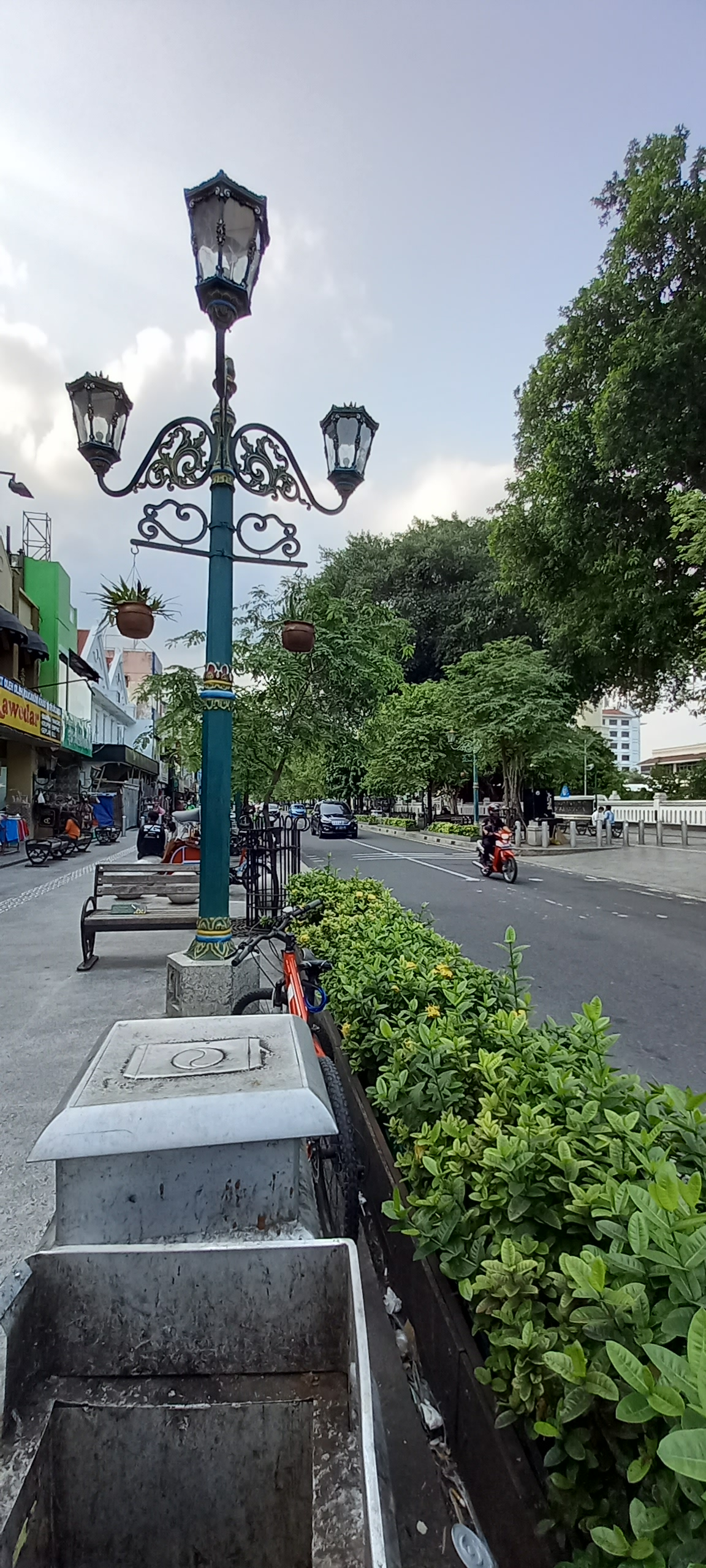

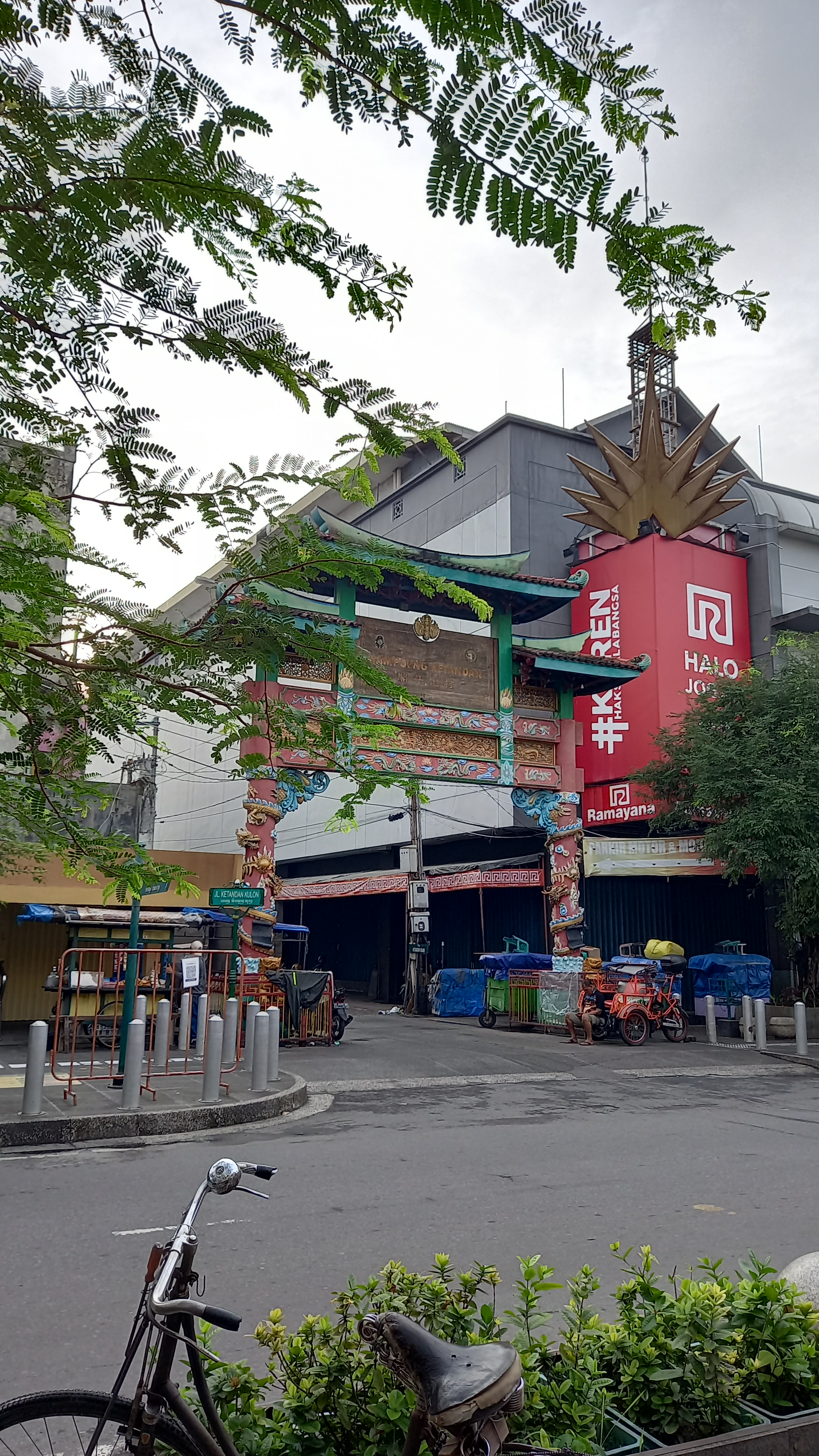

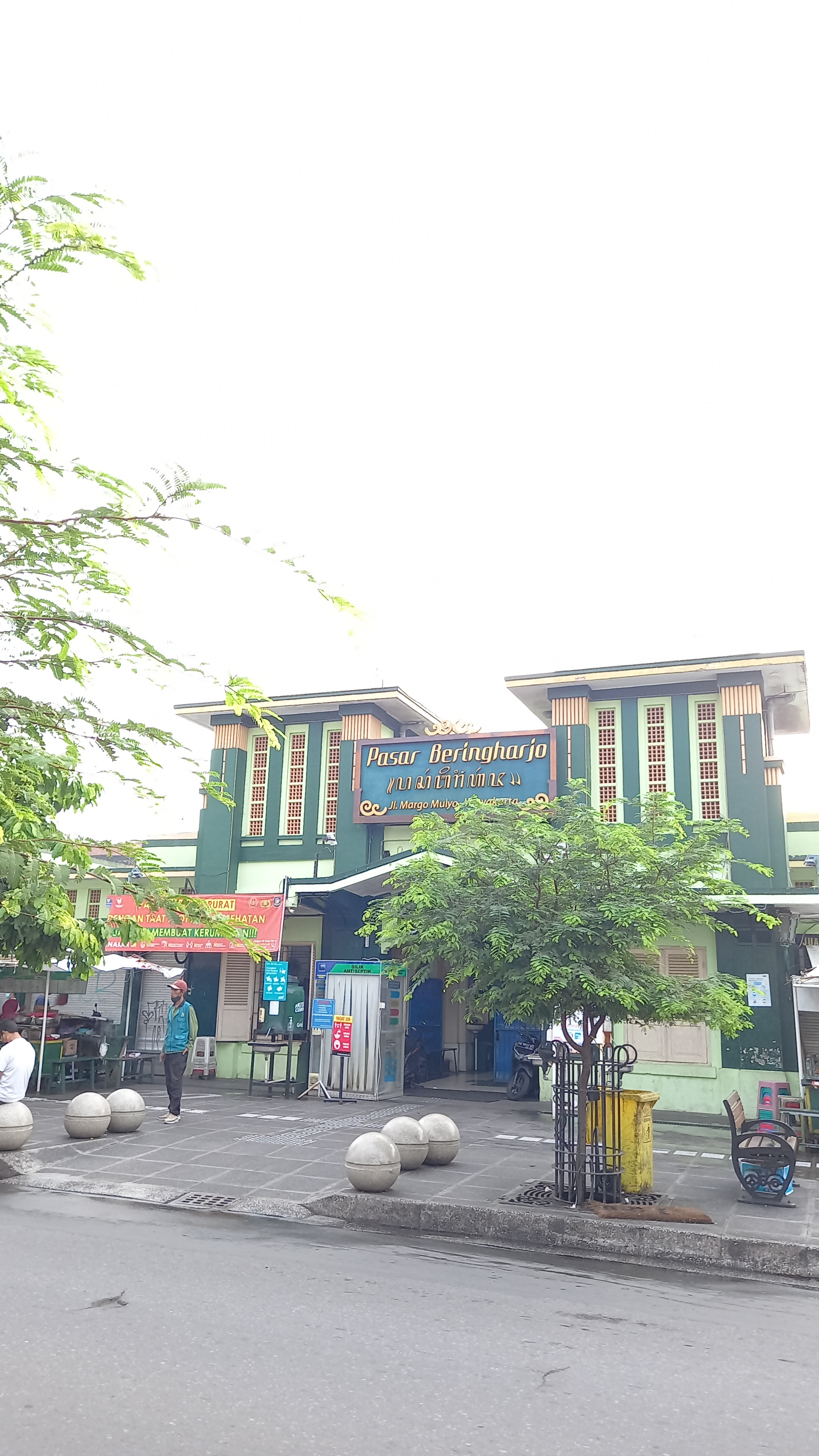

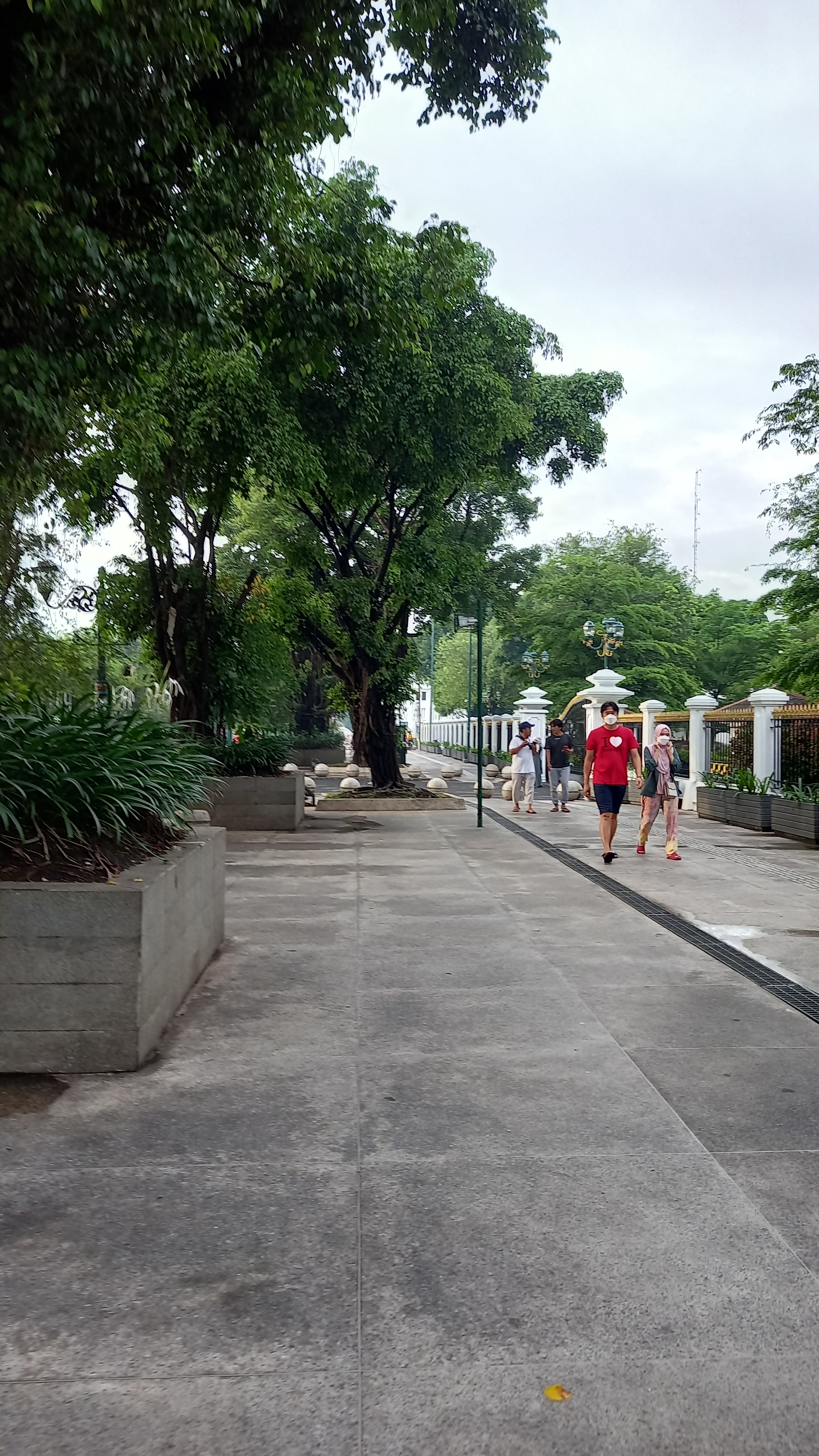

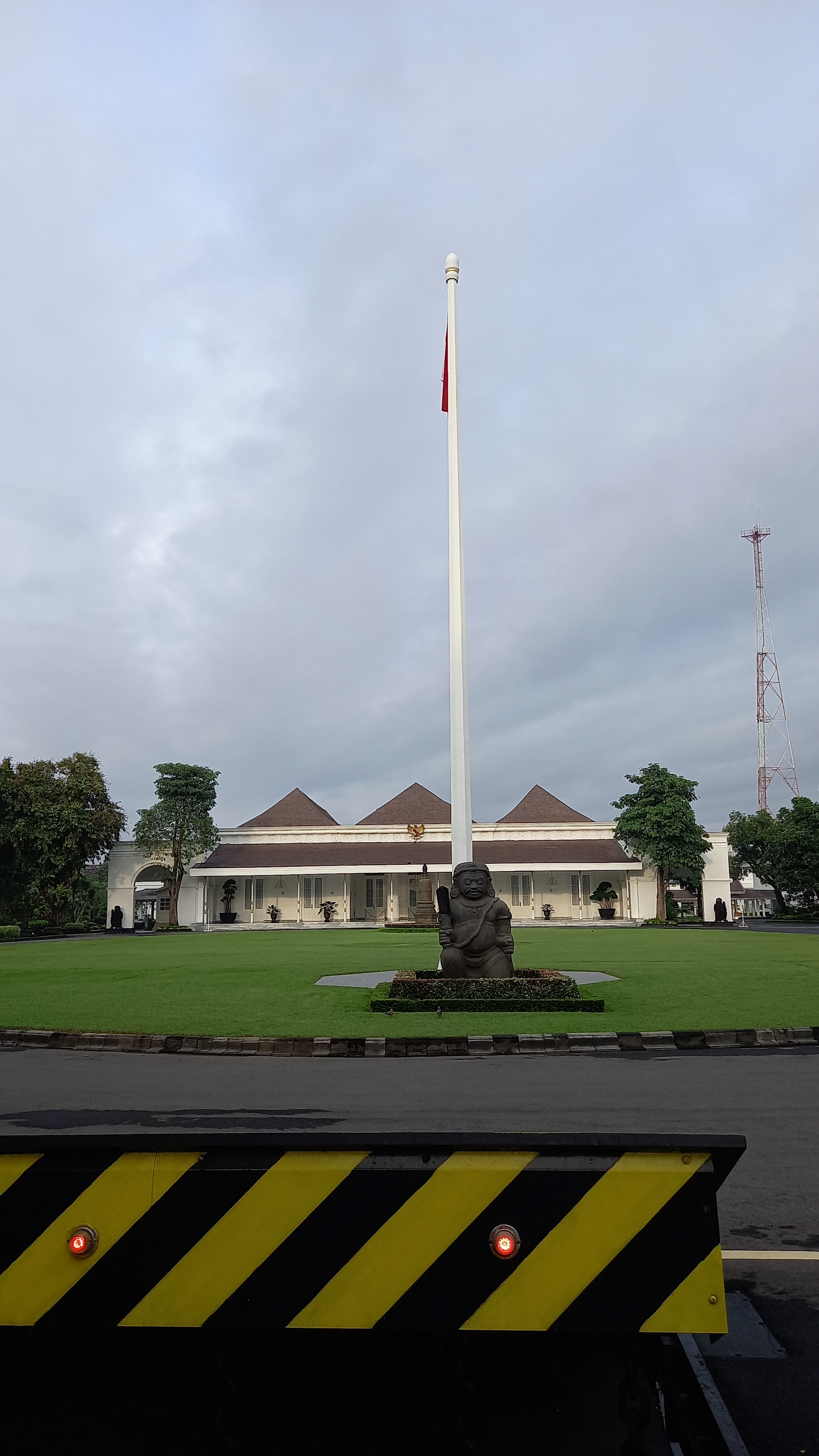

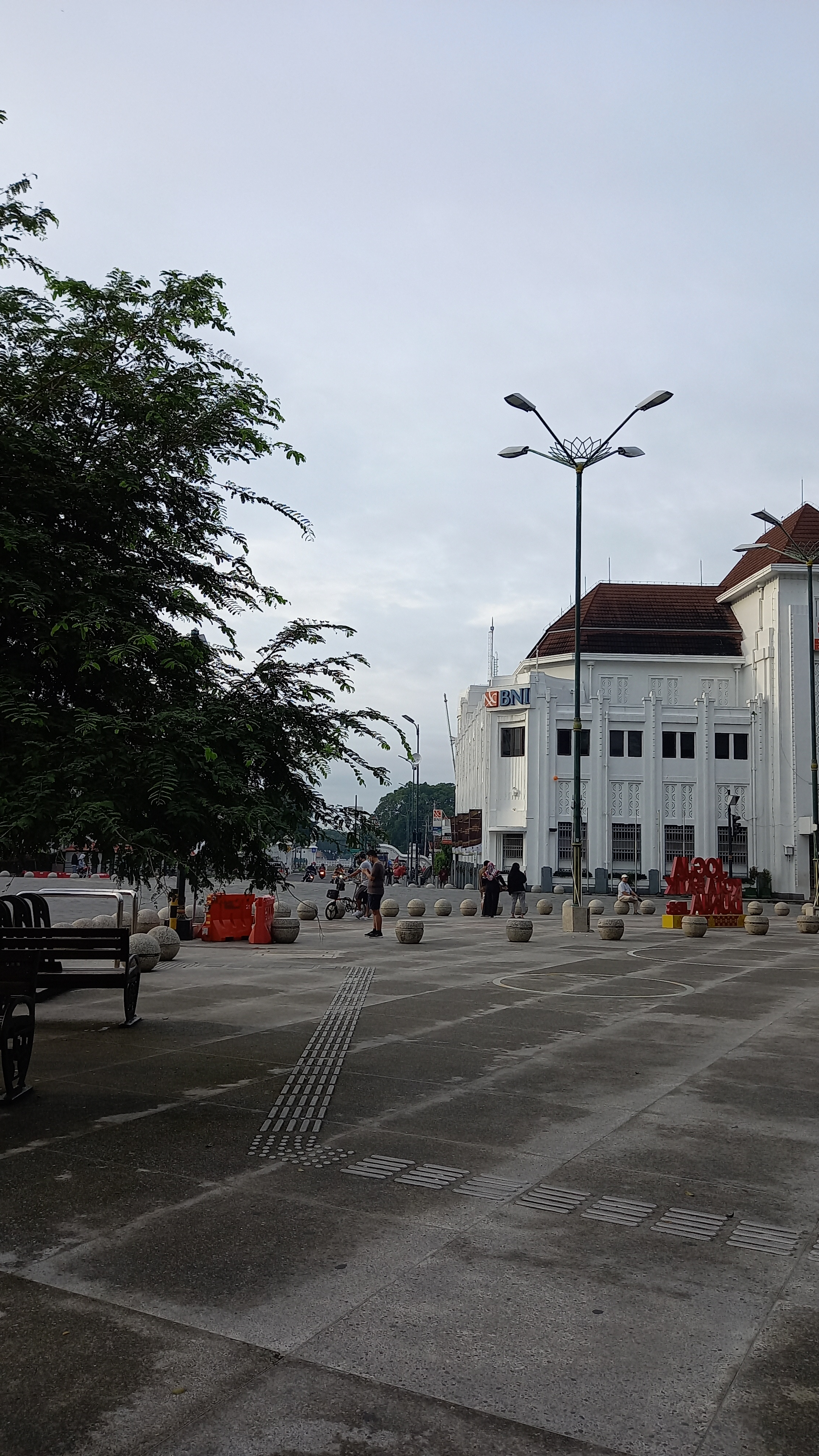

== Works cited ==
- Erikha, Fajar; Lauder, Multamia R.M.T. (2022). Toponimi di Jantung Kota Yogyakarta dari Perspektif Kebahasaan hingga Psikologi Sosial (in Indonesian). LIPI Press. ISBN 978-602-496-289-0.
- Suyenga, Joan A stroll down Yogyakarta's 'Main Street', pp.165-167 of Oey, Eric (1994) Java 2nd edition Periplus Editions ISBN 962-593-004-3
- Turner, Peter (1997). Java (1st ed.). Melbourne: Lonely Planet. pp. 215–216. ISBN 0-86442-314-4.
