= Ngande - Ande =

Pedukuhan Ngande-Ande
- Villages
- Country: Indonesia
- Province: Yogyakarta Special Region
- Region: Gunungkidul
- District: Kecamatan Tepus
- Village: Kelurahan Purwodadi

Government
  - Dukuh: Suyanta
  - RW: Mulud
  - RT: Marekan

Population
  - Total: 215

Pedukuhan Ngande - Ande is located in Kelurahan Purwodadi, Kecamatan Tepus, Gunungkidul, Yogyakarta Special Region, Indonesia. The name of Ngande - Ande comes from the tree, called Ande-ande Tree.

== History ==
The name of Ngande - ande taken by the name of legendary tree in this village, named Ande - ande Tree. It was different story with Ande - ande Lumut. Once upon the time, there was a sunan, a man who was spreading Islam in Javanese culture. One of Wali Songo. In his journey, he stopped under a tree called the Ande - ande tree. Because this village has no name, he gave Ngande - ande as the name.

== Geography ==
Ngande - ande is located in the border of Kecamatan Tepus and Kelurahan Purwodadi. In the east bordering with Kecamatan Girisubo, in the south with forest, in the west with Dusun Cepogo and the north side with Dusun Wuluh

=== Borderline ===
1. North: Padukuhan Wuluh
2. East: Girisubo
3. South: Padukuhan Duwet
4. West: Padukuhan Cepogo, Padukuhan Kotekan

=== Topography ===
Based on topographic conditions, Ngande-ande is divided into 3 (three) zones:

- Ngande - ande Lor, Located on the north side of the highway, and most of it goes to RT 2 (two)
- Ngande - ande Kidul, Located south of the highway, and belongs to RT 1 (one)
- Gintungan, Located in the west of the mountain which is directly adjacent to Cepogo Hamlet, and belongs to RT 1 (one)

=== Climatology ===
The Ngande-ande includes a tropical monsoon climate, with the topography of the area dominated by karst hilly areas.

== Economy ==
Ngande-ande has various economic potentials ranging from agriculture, plantations, livestock, and tourism potential. Most of the agriculture owned by Padukuhan Ngande-Ande is rainfed dry land. As an additional source of livelihood, the residents also raise various livestock such as chickens, goats and cows.

== Demographics ==
=== Religion ===
100% of the village is Muslim. Islam grew up slowly and become the only religion in this village.

=== Transportation ===
The village is passed by the provincial road link that connects East Java - Yogyakarta - Central Java - West Java - Jakarta via the south coast route. There is a mass transportation everyday from Daksinarga Terminal in Wonosari.

== Facilities ==
1. Mosque, Masjid Al Hidayah
2. Balai Dusun
3. Pos Kamling
4. Water Reservoir

== Government ==
Dusun Ngande - Ande has a simple structure, consisting of two rukun tetangga and one rukun warga and is led by a dukuh.

1. Dukuh: Mr. Suyanto
2. Head of rukun warga: Mr. Mulud
3. Head of rukun tetangga 1: Mr. Senot
4. Head of rukun tetangga 2: Mr. Marekan

In addition to official government officials, there is also an active youth organization and local youth association, namely PREND, which was recently established. The goal is the spirit of youth to love Pancasila and the NKRI.
