= Gunung Sewu Geopark =

Mountain range in Indonesia

Coordinates: 7.847530°S 110.479551°E

- Geopark Gunung Sewu
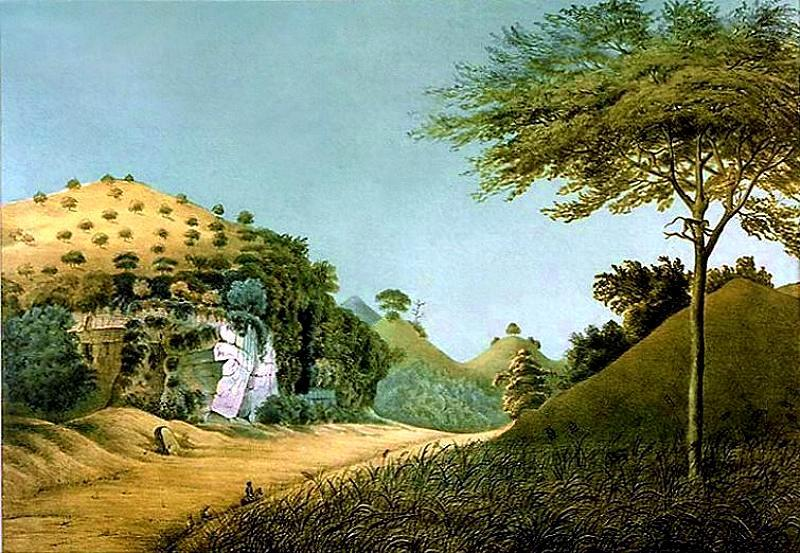
- Gunung Sewu

- Location within Indonesia
- Location: Gunung Kidul Regency, Wonogiri Regency, Pacitan Regency, Indonesia
- Nearest city: Yogyakarta, Semarang and Surakarta

Gunung Sewu Geopark or Sewu Mountains (Indonesian: Pegunungan Sewu) is a series of mountains stretching along the southern coast of Gunung Kidul Regency and Wonogiri Regency of Central Java, to Pacitan Regency of East Java in the island of Java, Indonesia. This is a national Geopark, which is also a member of Global Geopark Network (GGN), recognized by UNESCO in 2015.

== Characteristics ==
These mountains are a unique karstic landscape, characterized by the phenomenon being present on the surface (eksokarst) and subsurface (endokarst). Surface phenomena include positive formations such as karst hills totalling ± 40,000 conical hills, negative formation of karstic valleys and karstic lake. The subsurface phenomenon includes karst caves consisting of no less than 119 caves with stalactites and stalagmites, and underground rivers. Because of the uniqueness of its ecosystem, the 1993 International Union of Speleology proposed the Karst Area of the Sewu Mountains to be classed as a natural world heritage site. In the caves are also found human fossils from the early stone age about 1.8 million years old, along with stone tools for hunting. Sewu mountains were formed with the lifting of the seabed thousands of years ago. Limestone rocks are characteristic of these mountains. The limestone hills are reported to contain hundreds of caves. These are classified locally as vertical caves (known as luweng in Javanese) and horizontal caves. Jomblang cave_{(id)} (Luweng Jomblang) and Grubug Cave (Luwung Grubug), located in the Semanu subdistrict in Gunungkidul, as well as other caves in the area, are well-known to local caver (speleological) groups. Some of the caves are quite long; Cerme cave, for example, has an entrance in Bantul Regency and stretches for quite a distance eastward into Panggang subdistrict in Gunung Kidul Regency.

== Attractions ==
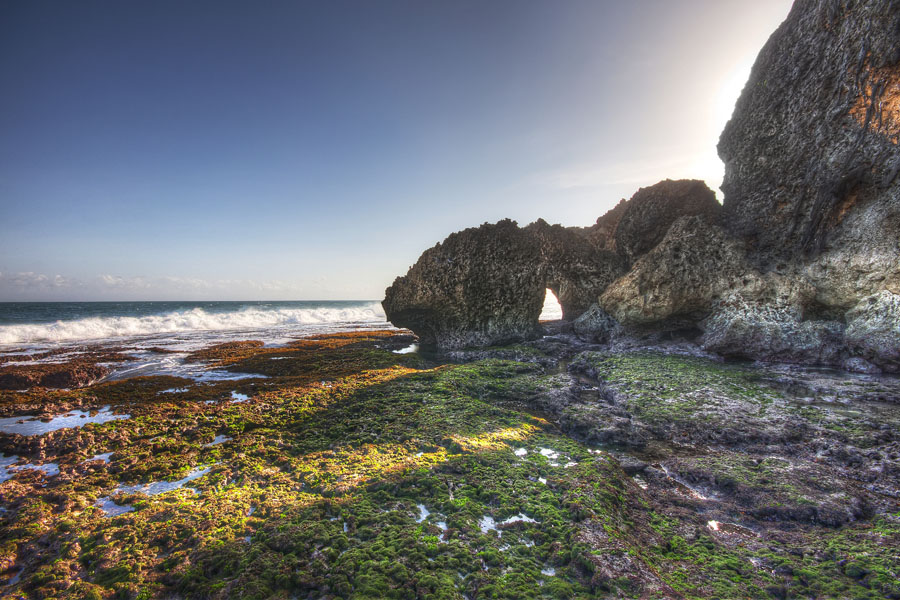
A halo at Ngobaran beach

The Geopark has many caves, some of which have underground rivers. where tubing activities can be carried on.

The Nglanggeran primeval volcano in the Patuk area is only 600 meters high but there are excellent views from the peak to the north towards Mount Merapi and to the south across to the coast of Java. Scattered giant granite and andesite rock formations called "watu wayang" (puppet rocks) are found at the Mt Nglanggeran_{(id)} area as well as a nearby man-made lake. It takes around 3 hours to hike from the Pendopo Kali Song entrance point to the peak.

Siung Beach Bay is about 300 meters length, but swimming is prohibited because of dangerous rocks and severe waves. The cliff surrounding the beach is suitable for rock climbing, with over 200 tracks.

200 meters east of Siung Beach there is a 10-meter Jogan tiered fall in Tepus district which is 70 kilometers from Yogyakarta (2 hours drive). Rainy season is the best time to see the Jogan tiered fall, because in dry season the water level is low.

== See also ==
- Members of the Global Geoparks Network
- List of National Geoparks
