= Yoetikno =

Indonesian politician (1948–2012)

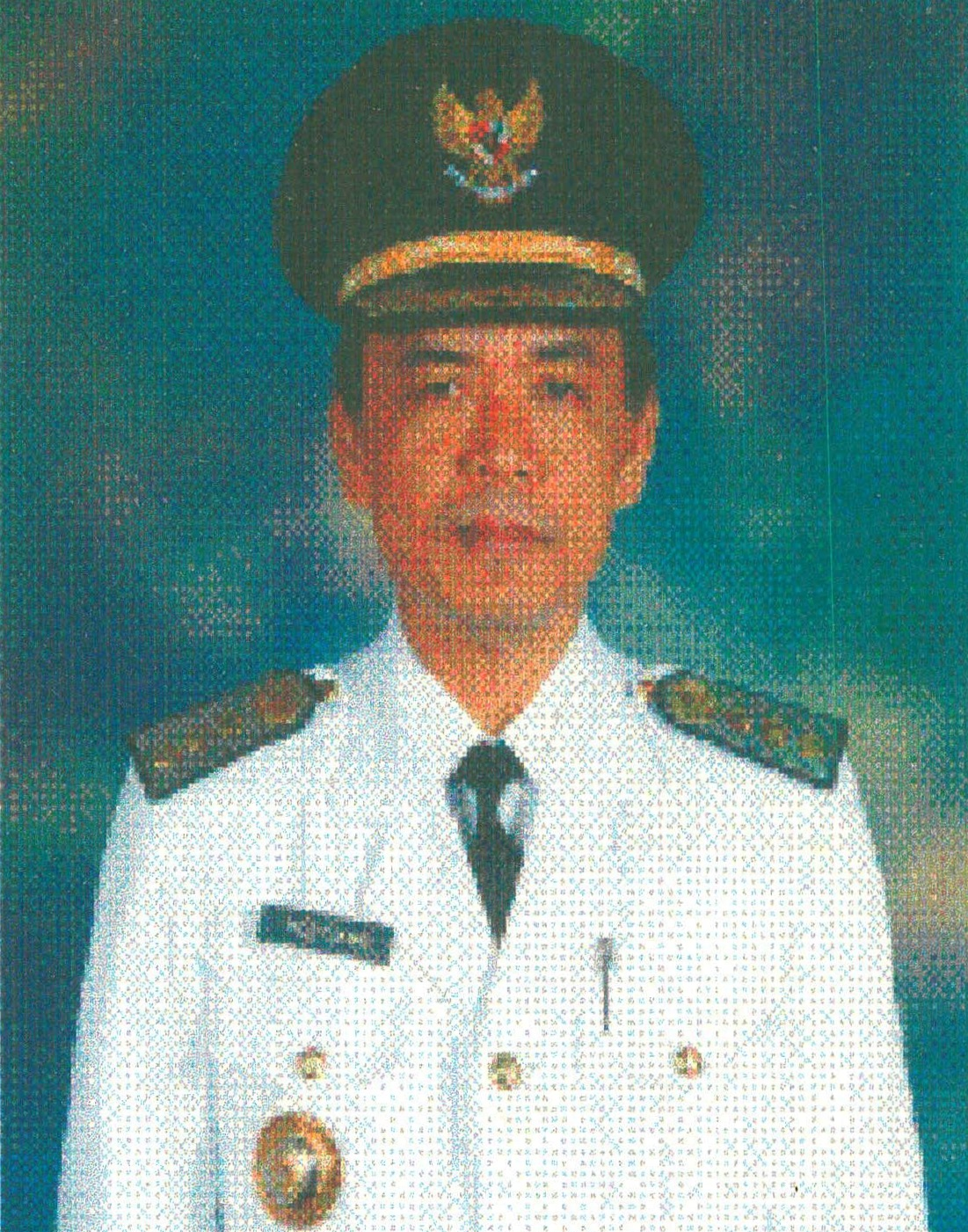

24th Regent of Gunung Kidul
- In office March 2000 – March 2005
- Preceded by: KRT Harsodiningrat
- Succeeded by: Suharto

Personal details
- Born: 20 January 1948 Gunung Kidul, Yogyakarta, Indonesia
- Died: 20 February 2012 (aged 64) Yogyakarta, Indonesia

Yoetikno (20 January 1948 – 20 February 2012), titled Kanjeng Raden Tumenggung Hardjo Hadinegoro, was an Indonesian politician who was the regent of Gunung Kidul Regency, Special Region of Yogyakarta between 2000 and 2005. He failed to win reelection for a second term in 2005, and was in the same year sentenced to prison for a corruption case.

== Early life ==
Yoetikno was born on 20 January 1948 at the village of Pilangrejo, in Nglipar district of Gunung Kidul Regency.

== Career ==
In 1999, he was elected by Gunung Kidul's Regional House of Representatives as regent of Gunung Kidul. His candidacy was backed by the Indonesian Democratic Party of Struggle and the National Awakening Party, with Subechi as running mate. His first term was from 2000 to 2005.

During his tenure, he led efforts along with Gadjah Mada University former rector Koesnadi Hardjasoemantri to start an institute of higher education in Gunung Kidul, eventually leading to the founding of University of Gunung Kidul in 2001. In February 2005, following an instruction from Sultan of Yogyakarta Hamengkubuwono X, Yoetikno and Subechi arranged restrictions against visits to the regency's coast and advised fishermen not go out to sea, citing extreme weather conditions. The municipal government under his tenure also constructed a new market in the regency seat of Wonosari and improved the regency's road and electrical systems.

== Arrest and death ==
After the end of his first term in March 2005, Yoetikno was designated as a suspect in a corruption case related to the procurement of fishing boats by the municipal government on 26 April 2005 following 6.5 hours of questioning. Despite his suspect status, he opted to run in the regency's 2005 direct election with the backing of PDI-P. He would place fourth out of five candidates in the election with 63,787 votes (16.3%), and the election was won by PAN-backed Suharto. On 12 December 2005, he was sentenced to 2 years and 8 months of prison by the Wonosari District Court, and fined Rp 50 million.

He died at the Muhammadiyah Hospital in Yogyakarta on 20 February 2012 due to complications from his diabetes, and he was buried at his home village the following day. He was survived by his wife Hartini and two sons. In Gunung Kidul, a death on a Kliwon Tuesday is believed to attract graverobbers stealing the deceased's shroud, and as Yoetikno died on such a day his family hired four local villagers to keep watch over his grave for 24 hours, lasting at least a full month.
