= Timang Beach =

Beach in Yogyakarta, Indonesia

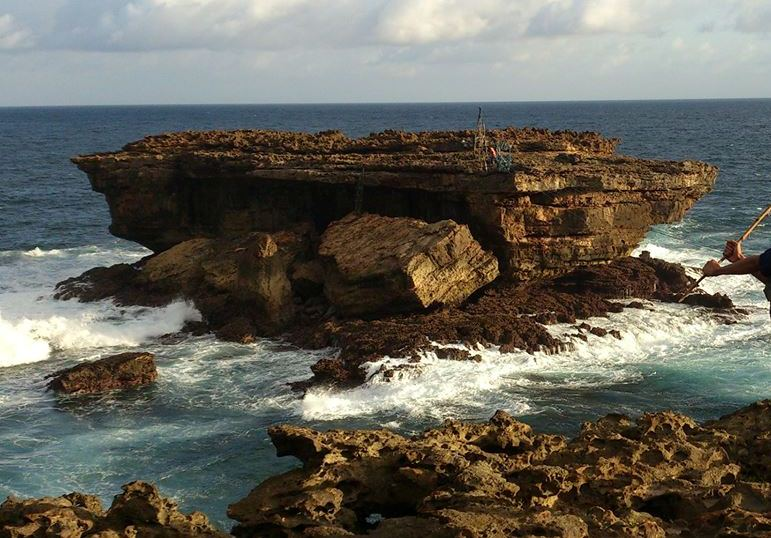
View of Timang beach and Panjang island

Timang beach (Indonesian: Pantai Timang) is a beach attraction at the boundary between the sea and the land that is located in Gunungkidul, Yogyakarta, Indonesia. Timang beach lies between Siung and Sundak beach in Gunungkidul. The uniqueness of this beach is that there is an island called Panjang Island which is lobster habitat across coastal marine.

== Location ==
Timang beach is located in Padukuhan Danggolo, Kelurahan Purwodadi, Kecamatan Tepus, Gunungkidul, Yogyakarta Special Region. To reach this beach visiting will be a little difficult because there is a lack of adequate signposts. Distance to the beach from Wonosari (the Gunungkidul capital region) is about 35 km. From Wonosari visitors will be through the direction to Baron Beach. From Mulo turn towards to the Siung Beach until you see Traditional market Dakbong.

== Panorama ==
Like most beaches in the area most of Gunung Kidul in general, Timang Beach consists of white sand and plants surrounding Pandan tree. This beach has not been developed so that the scenery looks still seems natural. Timang beach consists of two parts of the coast. The first part of the east side is a white sandy beach which is equal to the beaches most. The second part of the west shaped rocks are steep (hill) directly adjacent to the sea. In this section there are views of the island or a large stone across the beach. Island or a large rock that the surrounding community is referred to as the Panjang stone, Panjang Island and Timang Island. Panjang Island is known as the best place to hunting lobster by the local community. Timang Beach and Panjang Island connected via cable car is driven on the rope that connects the beach to the top of the island. The ropes used a diameter of 4 cm and has a length of approximately 200 meters. Communities around the regular use of the cable car to go fishing and lobster in Panjang Island.
