= Putro =

Putro can refer to:

== People ==
- Eeva Putro, Finnish actress and screenwriter
- Eko Putro Sandjojo, Indonesian politician
- Gustur Cahyo Putro (born 1997), Indonesian football right-back
- Samuli Putro, Finnish musician, part of the band Zen Café
- Sumpeno Putro (1947–2010), Indonesian politician
- Widodo Cahyono Putro (born 1970), Indonesian coach and former football forward
- Wisnu Haryo Putro (born 1989), Italian badminton player

== Other uses ==
- Putro (film), 2018 Bangladeshi film
