= SMA 2 Wonosari =

Sekolah Menegah Atas 2 Wonosari

Location
- Jalan Ki Ageng Giring No. 3 Wonosari 55813; Wonosari; Indonesia

Information
- Type: High school

Sekolah Menegah Atas 2 Wonosari is a high school in Wonosari, Gunung Kidul Regency. In 2010, it had a graduation rate of 93%, well above the regional average.
