= Suharto (Gunung Kidul regent) =

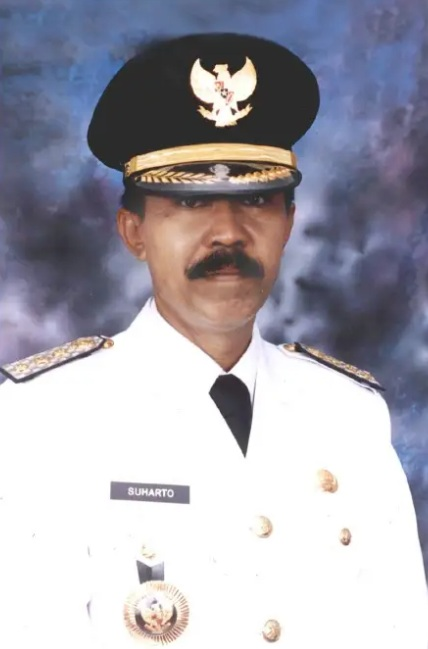

25th Regent of Gunung Kidul
- In office 28 July 2005 – 28 July 2010
- Preceded by: Yoetikno
- Succeeded by: Sumpeno Putro

Personal details
- Political party: PAN (until 2010); Golkar (2014)

Suharto is an Indonesian former politician who served as the regent of Gunung Kidul Regency, Special Region of Yogyakarta for one term between 2005 and 2010. He was a member of the National Mandate Party, but left it after the party did not support him running for a second term.

== Regent ==
Suharto was elected as regent of Gunung Kidul in its first direct election in 2005. With Badingah as his running mate and with the backing of the National Mandate Party, the pair secured 126,550 votes (32.3%) in a five-way race, defeating incumbent regent Yoetikno (who was under investigation for corruption at the time).

During his term as regent, Suharto supported the construction of a provincial southern ringroad which passed through Kulon Progo, which was partially funded by the regency budget. Suharto remarked that land acquisition costs for the road could have been reduced had the regency government been more involved in negotiations with affected landowners. In 2007, he designated Semoyo village, a village within the regency, as a conservation area to prevent over-exploitation of local rosewood. Suharto has also been credited with jumpstarting tourism within the regency.

With aid from the Japanese Red Cross, the municipal government constructed over 1,000 rainwater storage units in his term to improve water security. Late during his term, a protest was held against him due to alleged corruption, which turned violent when a group of counterprotesters clashed with the protesting students and housewives.

In 2010, when he attempted to seek a second term, PAN instead backed Sumpeno Putro who ran with Badingah. Suharto instead secured the support of the Indonesian Democratic Party of Struggle and the National Awakening Party, selecting local Nahdlatul Ulama figure Arif Gunadi as his running mate. Suharto and Gunadi obtained 129,841 votes (31.86%) in the election, and lost to Putro and Badingah who won 146,849 votes (36%). Suharto's tenure as regent expired on 28 July 2010.

== Later life ==
After his defeat in 2010, Suharto ran as a Golkar candidate in the 2014 legislative election for the provincial legislature, but failed to win a seat. He then retired from politics and began to work as a farmer and a cattle breeder in Gunung Kidul. He is married to Sumartini, and the couple has two children.
