= Endah Subekti Kuntariningsih =

Indonesian politician (born 1976)

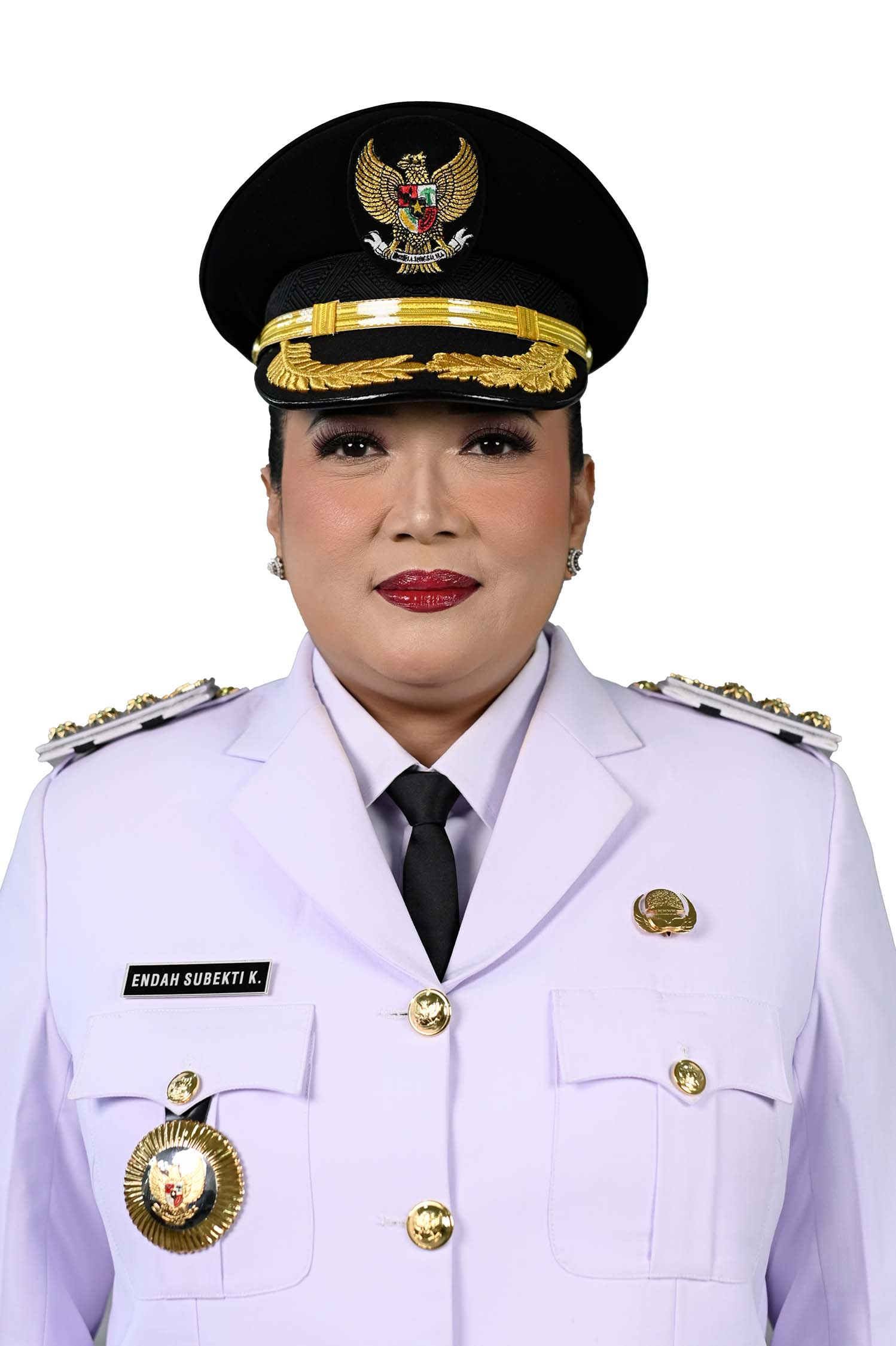

29th Regent of Gunung Kidul
- Incumbent
- Assumed office 20 February 2025
- Monarch: Hamengkubuwono X
- Governor: Hamengkubuwono X
- Deputy: Joko Parwoto
- Preceded by: Sunaryanta

Speaker of Gunung Kidul DPRD
- In office 30 September 2019 – 2024
- Preceded by: Demas Kursiswanto
- Succeeded by: Endang Sri Sumiyartini

Member of Gunung Kidul DPRD
- In office 2014–2024

Personal details
- Born: 23 March 1976 (age 49) Gunung Kidul, S.R. Yogyakarta, Indonesia
- Party: PDI-P
- Spouse: Tjatur Gono (m. 1999; died 2010)
- Children: 2

Endah Subekti Kuntariningsih (born 23 March 1976) is an Indonesian politician of the Indonesian Democratic Party of Struggle who has served as the regent of Gunung Kidul Regency since February 2025. She was previously a member of Gunung Kidul's municipal legislature in 2014–2024 and its speaker from 2019 to 2024.

== Early life and education ==
Endah Subekti Kuntariningsih was born in Gunung Kidul Regency on 23 April 1976 to Darso Winoto Sutino and Sutinah, as one of eight children. She studied there, graduating from a public high school in 1994. She would later continue her studies in Yogyakarta, receiving a diploma in 2002 and a bachelor's degree in 2004. She received a master's in agriculture from Diponegoro University on 6 February 2025.

== Career ==
After completing high school, Kuntariningsih worked for a time at electronic companies and at a travel agency. In 2004, she began to work as a tax consultant advising the city government of Yogyakarta, working until 2008.

Kuntariningsih's political activities began in 1997, when she initially took part in the campaigns of the United Development Party. During the campaigning, she met party officials of the Indonesian Democratic Party of Struggle's Yogyakarta branch, and they recruited her as a typist. By 2010, she was the party's deputy chairman for membership and recruitment in its Gunung Kidul branch. In 2011, she began to work as an expert staff for PDI-P's faction within Yogyakarta's provincial legislature.

She would run as the party's candidate in the 2014 Indonesian legislative election and won a seat in Gunung Kidul's regency legislature. She was elected as chairman of the party's Gunung Kidul branch in 2015, and in that year she became running mate of Djangkung Sudjarwadi to contest the regency's election. They placed second behind the incumbent Badingah, winning 104,440 votes (24.6%).

Kuntariningsih was reelected for a second term in the regency legislature in 2019, and she was elected as legislature speaker, taking office on 30 September 2019. She ran for a third term in 2024, but failed to secure a seat. After her failure in the legislative election, she became PDI-P's candidate in the 2024 regency election, with Joko Parwoto as running mate. The pair won the election with 179,460 votes (40.8%), defeating incumbent regent Sunaryanta. They were sworn in on 20 February 2025.

As regent, Kuntariningsih implemented an online payment system for tourist areas in an effort to reduce illegal charges on visitors.

== Personal life ==
She was married to Tjatur Gono, who was a treasurer in PDI-P's provincial branch, in 1999 until Gono died in 2010. The couple had two children. On 22 April 2025, she was made an abdi dalem (courtier) of the Yogyakarta Sultanate, with the nobility title Nyi Kanjeng Mas Tumenggung Sari Bekti Argani.
