= Pindul Cave =

Karst cave in Indonesia

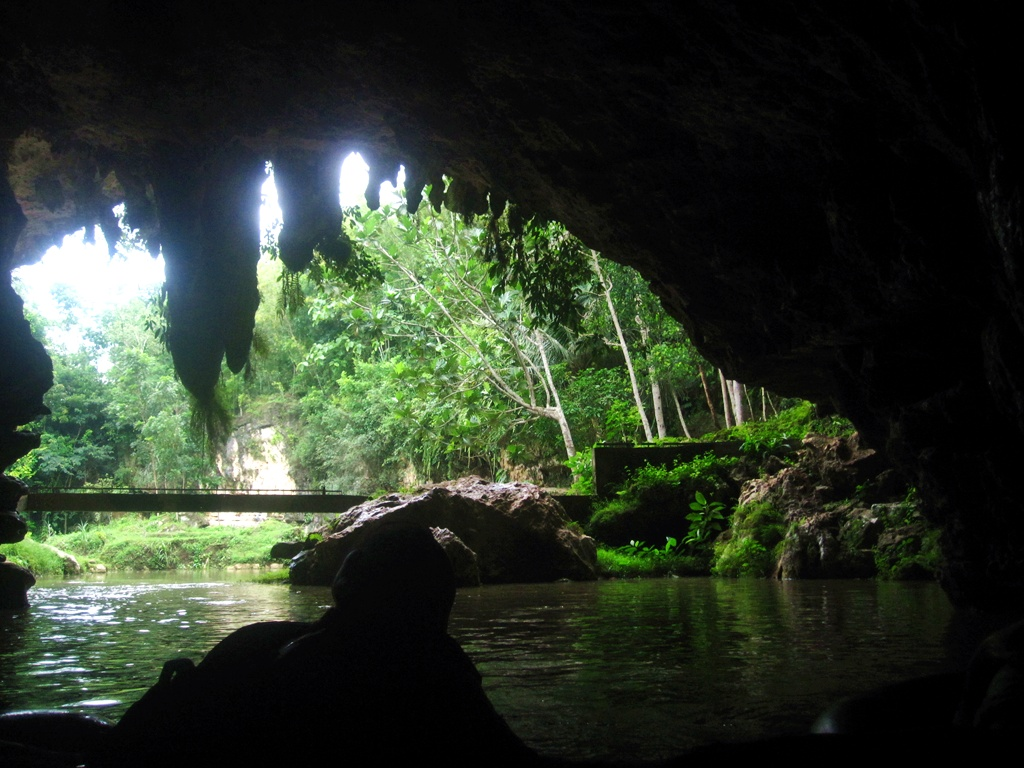
View from inside the Pindul Cave, Indonesia

Pindul Cave (Indonesian: Gua Pindul; Javanese: ꦒꦸꦮꦥꦶꦤ꧀ꦢꦸꦭ꧀, romanized: Guwa Pindul) is a cave formed by karst with underground river located about 7 kilometres south of the city centre Wonosari, Gunung Kidul. Gua Pindul is known for the cave tubing that visitors can do and is done with tires that float above the underground river inside the cave, this activity known as cave tubing. There are gaps above the cave that can be passed as a pathway to enter vertically.
