= Harsodiningrat =

Indonesian politician and civil servant

23rd Regent of Gunung Kidul
- In office November 1994 – 1999
- Preceded by: Soebekti Soenarto
- Succeeded by: Yoetikno

Personal details
- Born: Harsono Sumardi; 16 January 1936
- Died: 22 February 2025 (aged 89) Yogyakarta, Indonesia

Kanjeng Raden Tumenggung Harsodiningrat (16 January 1936 – 22 February 2025), also titled Kanjeng Pangeran Haryo Mangunkusumo, was an Indonesian politician and civil servant. He was the regent of Gunung Kidul Regency from 1994 to 1999.

== Early life and education ==
Harsodiningrat was born as Harsono Sumardi on 16 January 1936. He was an alumnus of Gadjah Mada University, with a bachelor's degree from its social and political science department and a master's degree in business management. During his time at Gadjah Mada, he was part of the university's student council and its student regiment.

== Career ==
He began to work as a civil servant in 1962, initially as an intern and then as a temporary worker before becoming a secretary in the gubernatorial office of the Yogyakarta Special Region in 1965. He gradually rose up the ranks in the provincial government of Yogyakarta, becoming a district head (camat) by 1975 and by 1984 he was appointed head of the development department in Bantul Regency. In 1992, he was appointed secretary of the provincial legislature. At some point, the Yogyakarta Sultanate granted him the title of Kanjeng Pangeran Haryo, the highest title of the courtiers.

On 6 October 1994, he was elected as regent of Gunung Kidul Regency by its Regional House of Representatives to replace Soebekti Soenarto, defeating two other candidates. He was sworn in as regent in November 1994. Gunung Kidul was the poorest part of the province during his tenure, and the government conducted over half of its development of disadvantaged villages program within Gunung Kidul. He served as regent until 1999.

== Later life ==
His autobiography was published in 2020. He died at his home in Yogyakarta on 22 February 2025, and was buried at a cemetery for Yogyakartan Sultanate courtiers in the city. He was survived by his wife and three children.
