= Badingah =

Indonesian politician (born 1949)

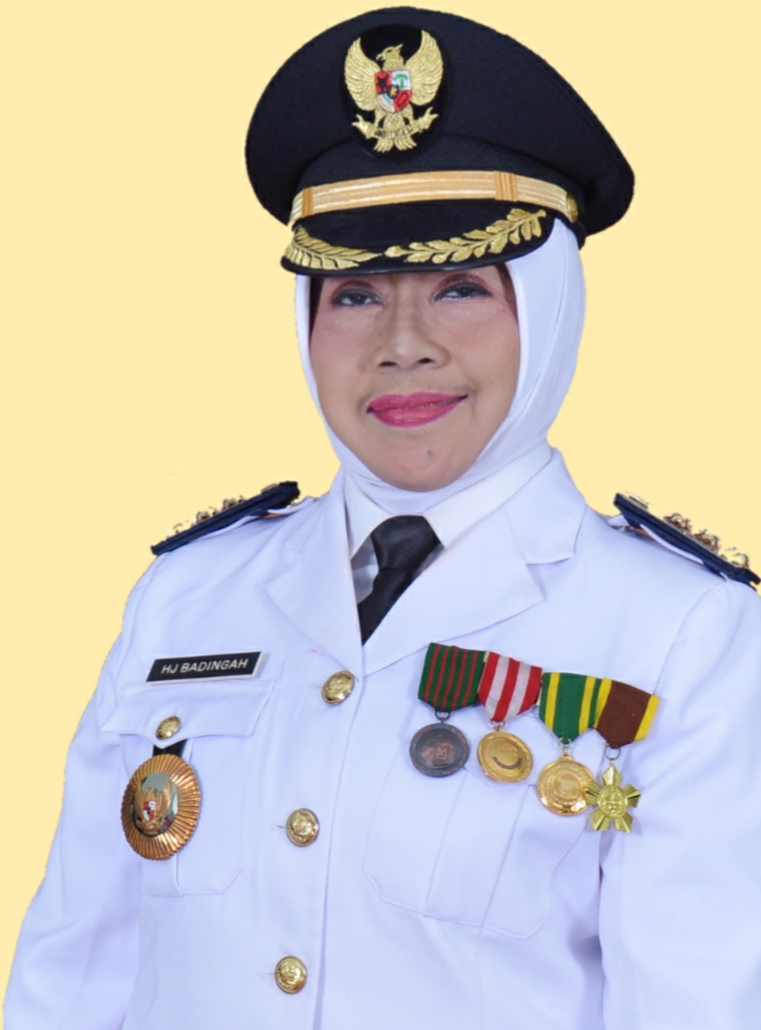
- Portrait in 2016

27th Regent of Gunung Kidul
- In office 17 February 2016 – 17 February 2021
- In office 3 March 2011 – 27 July 2015; Acting regent from 3 November 2010
- Preceded by: Sumpeno Putro
- Succeeded by: Sunaryanta

Vice Regent of Gunung Kidul
- In office 28 July 2005 – 3 November 2010
- Regent: Suharto; Sumpeno Putro
- Preceded by: M. Subechi
- Succeeded by: Immawan Wahyudi

Personal details
- Born: 17 September 1949 (age 76) Gunung Kidul, Yogyakarta, Indonesia
- Political party: PAN

Badingah (born 17 September 1949) is an Indonesian businesswoman and politician of the National Mandate Party. She served as the regent of Gunung Kidul Regency, Special Region of Yogyakarta from November 2010 to July 2015 and February 2016 to February 2021, along with being vice regent from 2005 to November 2010.

== Early life and family ==
Badingah was born on 17 September 1949 in Gunung Kidul Regency to Hadi Utomo and Sudjinah. She completed high school in the regency capital of Wonosari, graduating in 1968 before later receiving a bachelor's degree in 2003. She was married to Golkar politician Wasito Donosaroyo, who was speaker of Gunung Kidul's municipal DPRD from 1999 to his death in 2002. The couple had three children.

== Career ==
While her husband was alive, Badingah was active in politics, leading Golkar's women wing in Gunung Kidul starting in 1999. In Gunung Kidul's first regency election in 2005, Badingah ran as the running mate of National Mandate Party (PAN) candidate Suharto, the pair winning the election with 126,514 votes. For the 2010 election, Suharto failed to secure PAN's support and instead ran as a PDI-P candidate, while Badingah remained within PAN and became running mate of Sumpeno Putro. Putro and Badingah won the election with 146,849 votes.

=== Regent ===
Around three months into their term, on 3 November 2010, Putro died of a heart attack following an orientation trip held by the Home Affairs ministry. Badingah succeeded him initially as acting regent. She would be appointed as formal regent on 3 March 2011. She was the first female regent in Gunung Kidul. PAN's Immawan Wahyudi was appointed as her vice regent.

During her first term, Badingah imposed a ban on mining activities in the karst hills within the regency. In 2014, a local Islamic group disputed the legality of a newly built Pentecostal Church in Gunung Kidul, and the church was closed with the pastor expelled. The pastor reached out to Badingah, who assigned senior civil servant Tommy Harahap to mediate the groups. She also took part in person during community discussions, and the church was reopened in March 2015. She also expanded emergency services in the regency with donations of firefighting and ambulance cars from Toyota in 2015.

Badingah with Wahyudi ran for a second and full term in the 2015 regency election, receiving the support of PAN, Golkar, Nasdem, PPP, and Hanura. They won reelection with 167,915 votes (39.53%), defeating three other candidates. Their second term began on 17 February 2016. During her second term, Badingah focused on development of tourism in the regency, including the development of destinations such as Baron Beach. Badingah further promoted female education within Gunung Kidul in order to suppress child marriage. In December 2020, she launched a public service mall in the regency for administrative services.

=== Other activities ===
In 2018, the NasDem Party assigned Badingah to the campaign team of Joko Widodo in the 2019 election, but she rejected the position. It then became known that she was registered as a member of both Nasdem and PAN. PAN called for Badingah to refrain from campaigning in the election and to adopt a neutral position in order to focus on her duties as regent. On another occasion, a candidate in Gunung Kidul's 2024 regency election claimed Badingah's membership in their campaign team, which she publicly denied.

Badingah owns and operates several retail stores in the regency seat of Wonosari, including a furniture shop and three pharmacy outlets. After her tenure as regent expired in 2021, she stated that she will return to focusing on her business.
