= Purwodadi, Tepus, Gunungkidul =

Kelurahan Purwodadi
- Kalurahan
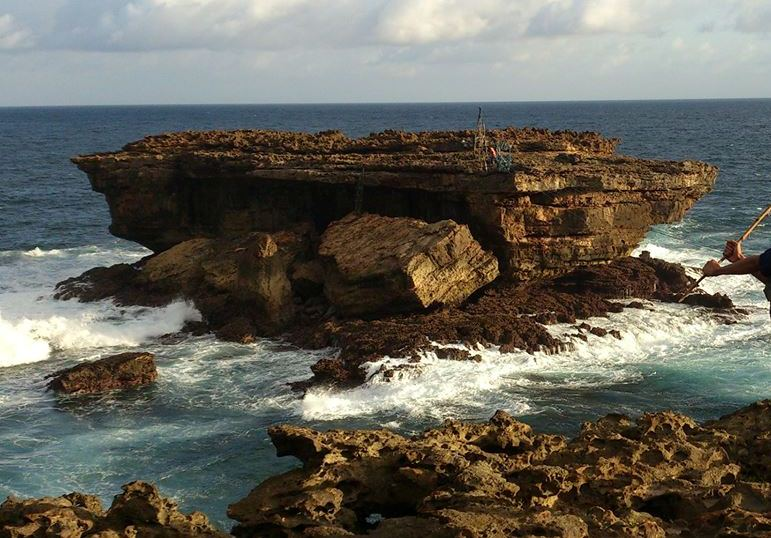
- Timang beach and Panjang island, the icon of Kelurahan Purwodadi

- Location Java Island
- Country: Indonesia
- Province: Yogyakarta Special Region
- Regency: Gunungkidul
- District: Tepus

Purwodadi is one of the Kelurahans in Kecamatan Tepus, Gunungkidul, Yogyakarta Special Region, Indonesia. A Kelurahan is an administrative village (Indonesian: kelurahan, desa), the lowest level of government administration in Indonesia.

== Villages ==
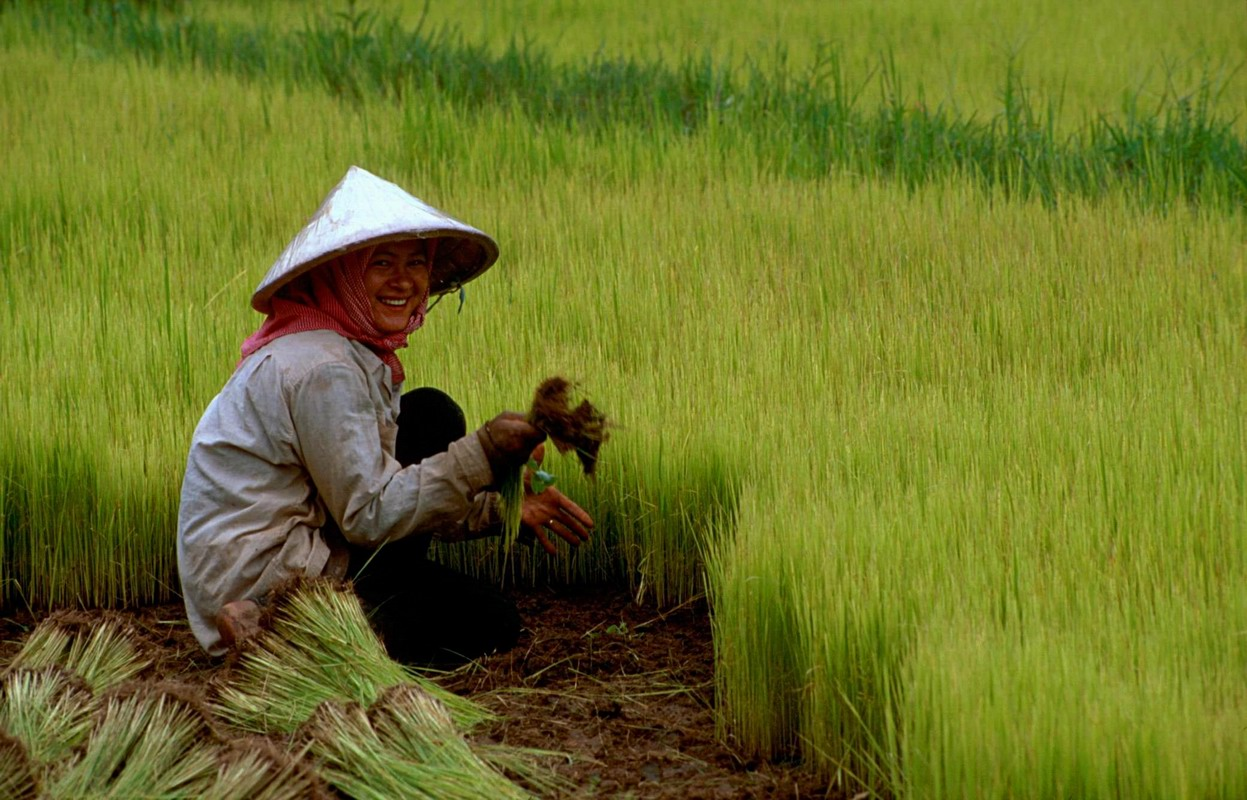
Agriculture remains the economic mainstay.

- Ngande - Ande
- Wuluh
- Cepogo
- Winangun
- Duwet
- Ngandong
- Danggolo
- Kotekan
- Pringsanggar
- Cakbohol
- Gesing I
- Gesing II
- Sureng I
- Sureng II
- Gerotan

== Education ==
=== Elementary school ===
- SDN Belik
- SDN Purwodadi I
- SDN Purwodadi II
- SDN Gesing I
- SDN Gesing II
- SD Muhammadiyah Purwodadi

=== Junior high school ===
- SMP Muhammadiyah 2 Tepus

== Government ==
=== Lurah List ===
- Suprihatin
- Sucipto
- Sagiyanto

== Tourism ==
=== Beach Tourism ===
- Pantai Ngetun
- Timang Beach
- Pantai Jogan
- Pantai Lambor
- Siung Beach
- Banyu Nibo

=== Culture Tourism ===
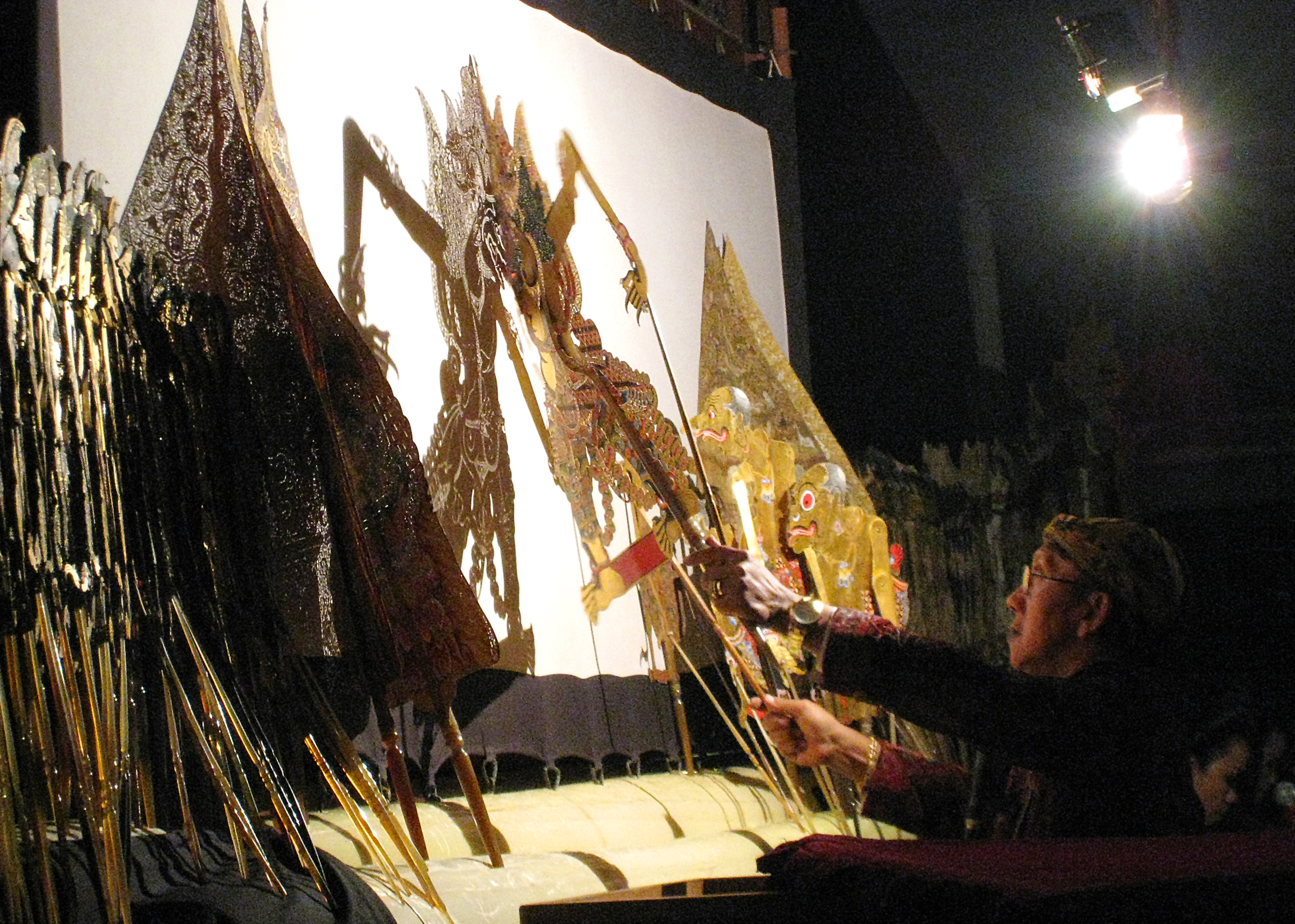
Javanese wayang kulit performancedalang Ki Manteb Sudharsono

- Rasulan
- Wayang Kulit
- Campursari
- Ketoprak / Wayang Orang
- Jathilan
- Reog
- Sadranan
- Kenduri

== Sports ==
=== Football ===
- Persipurwa Purwodadi
- PSG Gesing
