= List of Running Man long-term projects =

Since 2017, Running Man has been initiating various long-term projects, which span over multiple episodes with a single objective, rather than the previous episodic format.

== Long-term projects ==
=== Member's Week ===
- Episodes 333–337, 339–340

This is a Running Man project to celebrate the members hard work for more than seven years, which allow members to choose a theme for each week and allowed to construct the episode as they wish.

Episode(s)	Airdate(s)	Guest(s)	Notes
333	January 8, 2017	No guests	The first week was Song Ji-hyo's week and she decided to go on an MT Trip, but the PD put a twist and set it during the freezing cold weather.
334	January 15, 2017	No guests	The second week was Kim Jong-kook's week, which he decided to leave his theme to the PD. So, the production staff decided to set a blind date for him.
335	January 22, 2017	No guests	The third week was Ji Suk-jin's week and he designed a special prison for the members with himself as the boss. In the end, the mission was to escape from prison and attend Ji Suk-jin's renewal vows ceremony with his wife.
336	January 29, 2017	Gary (Leessang)	The fourth week was Gary's week and he decided to hold the sixth "Best of the Best Match" episode, but as a twist, the members were not told who is the week's host and Gary's involvement in the episode.
337	February 5, 2017	No guests	The fifth week was Haha's week and the producers prepared various missions where he had to keep making difficult choices. Eventually, the final mission was to prevent Haha from winning because the other members already prepared a surprise to congratulate Haha's second to-be-born son.
339	February 19, 2017	Heo Kyung-hwan KCM Kim Won-hee Kim Yong-man Lee Chun-hee	The sixth week was Yoo Jae-suk's week, where he held an athletic competition and invited several guests to join with a twist for the final mission.
340	February 20, 2017	No guests	The seventh and final week was Lee Kwang-soo's week and he planned a night trip with other members to prove their loyalty and bond of friendship. He designed a twist to get revenge for always making him the first person to be suspected in the past episodes.

During the course of the special episodes, Lee Kwang-soo is the only cast member that did not get water-bombed. Yoo Jae-suk is the only cast member who got water-bombed twice, while Ji Suk-jin's water-bombed moment during the preparation episode for the Member's Week project was not aired.

=== Global Race ===
- Episodes 346–354

This is a Running Man project to commemorate the new members and production staff shift. It involves filming the program in overseas locations with penalties involve visiting dangerous tourist attractions around the world. The penalties are given to members that have collected three Tourist Cards, which are given when they lost during missions.

- Results:

- In ep 350–351, Yoo Jae-suk, Haha, Ji Suk-jin, Lee Kwang-soo, Jeon So-min and Yang Se-chan collected three Tourist Cards and selected for the dangerous mission.
- In ep 351, The venue for the dangerous mission was chosen, which was "Super Scary Labyrinth of Fear" in Fuji-Q Highland, Japan.
- In ep 352–353, Kim Jong-kook exempted Haha from the dangerous mission.
- In ep 353–354, Yoo Jae-suk, Ji Suk-jin, Lee Kwang-soo, Jeon So-min and Yang Se-chan visited Fuji-Q Highland for the scary labyrinth penalty in Japan.
- In ep 353–354, Haha, Kim Jong-kook and Song Ji-hyo visited Yokohama as a reward for avoiding the penalty.

=== 1% People's Recommendation ===
- Episodes 355–359, 369–371

This was a Running Man project where the production staff solicited fan recommendations for relatively unique tourist attractions, selecting from those that received only 1% of the total vote. Two Running Man members were chosen to complete the project, signified by the accumulation of three I-Go Stickers.

- Results:

- In ep 359, Both Haha and Jeon So-min individually received three I-Go stickers with the former being accompanied by Yang Se-chan and the latter by Lee Kwang-soo.
- In ep 370, it was revealed that their visit to the Giant Canyon Swing at Glenwood Caverns Adventure Park in Colorado, U.S had to be moved to the Nevis Swing in Queenstown, New Zealand due to visa complications.
- In ep 369–371, Jeon So-min and Lee Kwang-soo visited Timang Beach for the cable cart ride penalty in Yogyakarta, Indonesia.
- In ep 378–379, Haha and Yang Se-Chan visited Nevis Highwire Platform for the Nevis Swing penalty in Queenstown, New Zealand. Kim Jong-kook and Song Ji-hyo who accompanied them also took the penalty due to a chance card they chose.

=== Half and Half Tour ===
- Episodes 365–369, 372

This is a Running Man project where the members are competing against the production staff, where the former is requesting for the program to visit vacation venues for delight missions while the latter want to send them to visit distinctive venues for dangerous missions. Each episode will have both sides compete where the winner is allowed to put their recommendation into a spinning wheel with a member's name attached to complete the mission. The final decision will be conducted after 4 venues have been decided.

- Results:

- In ep 365, Yoo Jae-suk was chosen to visit the Nevis Swing in Queenstown, New Zealand for a dangerous mission.
- In ep 366, Jeon So-min was chosen to visit Bora Bora, French Polynesia for a delight mission.
- In ep 367–368, Yoo Jae-suk was chosen to visit Rome, Italy for a delight mission.
- In ep 369, the final penalty was given to Lee Kwang-soo and another member where they will visit Crocosaurus Cove's Cage of Death in Darwin, Australia.
- In ep 372, Lee Kwang-soo chose Yoo Jae-suk as his partner to visit Crocosaurus Cove's Cage of Death.
- In ep 378–379, Lee Kwang-soo and Yoo Jae-suk with Ji Suk-jin and Jeon So-min visited the Crocosaurus Cove for the Kwang-soo and Jae-suk's penalty in Darwin, Australia. Ji Suk-jin was forced to take the penalty as well, due to a chance card they chose.

=== Family Package Project ===
- Episodes 392–396, 399–400, 406–408

This is a Running Man project where 4 guests, Hong Jin-young, Kang Han-na, Lee Da-hee and Lee Sang-yeob, became temporary members for 4 weeks. The winners of each episodes are eligible for a luxury package, which includes trips to popular tourist destinations. On the other hand, the losers of each episodes are given a shuddering package, which includes trip to terrifying tourist destinations. In the final episode, a roulette filled with luxury and shuddering packages which have been assigned to the members will be spun to decide which package that the members will fulfill.

In the end, on Episode 400, it was revealed through the roulette that whichever members who gets the luxury package will be heading to Switzerland whereas the members who gets the shuddering package will be heading to United Kingdom.

On Episode 406–408, Haha, Kim Jong-kook, Song Ji-hyo, Yang Se-chan, Hong Jin-young and Kang Han-na headed to Switzerland to complete their Luxury Package while Yoo Jae-suk, Lee Kwang-soo, Ji Suk-jin, Jeon So-Min, Lee Da-hee and Lee Sang-yeob headed to United Kingdom to complete their Shuddering Package, with only 3 selected members (Yoo Jae-suk, Lee Da-hee and Lee Kwang-soo), which was revealed on Episode 407, heading to complete "Wing Walking" mission.

- Results:

Episode(s)	Luxury Package	Shuddering Package
392–393	Haha Kim Jong-kook Song Ji-hyo Yang Se-chan Hong Jin-young Kang Han-na	Yoo Jae-suk Ji Suk-jin Lee Kwang-soo Jeon So-min Lee Da-hee Lee Sang-yeob
395	Yoo Jae-suk Ji Suk-jin Kim Jong-kook Lee Kwang-soo Hong Jin-young Lee Da-hee	Haha Song Ji-hyo Jeon So-min Yang Se-chan Kang Han-na Lee Sang-yeob
396	Yoo Jae-suk Ji Suk-jin Song Ji-hyo Jeon So-min Yang Se-chan Hong Jin-young	Haha Kim Jong-kook Lee Kwang-soo Kang Han-na Lee Da-hee Lee Sang-yeob
400	Haha Kim Jong-kook Song Ji-hyo Jeon So-min Kang Han-na Lee Sang-yeob	Yoo Jae-suk Ji Suk-jin Lee Kwang-soo Yang Se-chan Hong Jin-young Lee Da-hee
400 (Final Result)	Haha Kim Jong-kook Song Ji-hyo Yang Se-chan Hong Jin-young Kang Han-na	Yoo Jae-suk Ji Suk-jin Lee Kwang-soo Jeon So-min Lee Da-hee Lee Sang-yeob

=== Penalty Week ===
- Ep618 to Ep622
