= Sunaryanta =

Indonesian politician (born 1970)

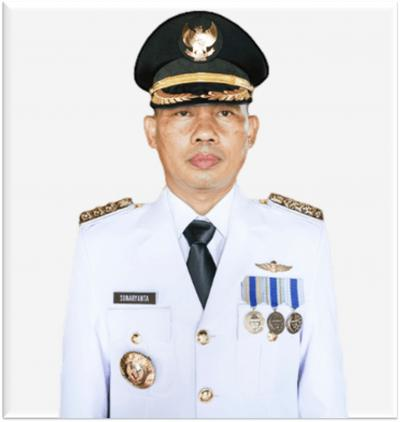

28th Regent of Gunung Kidul
- In office 26 February 2021 – 20 February 2025
- Preceded by: Badingah
- Succeeded by: Endah Subekti Kuntariningsih

Personal details
- Born: 9 November 1970 (age 55) Gunung Kidul, S.R. Yogyakarta, Indonesia
- Party: PSI (since 2025)

Military service
- Branch/service: Indonesian Army
- Years of service: 1993–2020
- Rank: Major

Sunaryanta (born 9 November 1970) is an Indonesian politician and former military officer who served as the regent of Gunung Kidul, Yogyakarta Special Region between 2021 and 2025. He previously served in the Indonesian Army, notably as adjutant to defense minister Ryamizard Ryacudu.

== Early life ==
Sunaryanta was born on 9 November 1970 as the first child of farmers Karso Wiyono and Welas. Their family home is located in the village of Kwarasan Wetan, within Nglipar district of Gunung Kidul Regency. He studied at a public elementary school in his home village, and then at a public middle school and private high school in Nglipar. After completing high school, he enrolled at the NCO school for Kostrad, graduating in 1993, before obtaining a diploma from the Indonesian Army engineering institute in 1995.

== Career ==
=== Military service ===
Starting his military service on 13 February 1993, Sunaryanta was part of Kostrad and for a time was a communications officer in Kodam III/Siliwangi. In 2002, he was assigned as adjutant to Ryamizard Ryacudu, at that time Kostrad's commander. Ryacudu became the Indonesian Army's chief of staff that year, and Sunaryanta remained as his adjutant until 2005. Ryacudu would retain Sunaryanta during the former's time as defense minister in 2014–2019, with Sunaryanta being his adjutant in 2014 to 2015 and personal assistant from 2016 to 2019.

In August 2020, Sunaryanta submitted his resignation from military service to run in the regency election for Gunung Kidul. At the time of his resignation, he held the rank of major, and was assigned to clerical duties within the Ministry of Defense.

=== Gunung Kidul ===
Sunaryanta ran in the 2020 election with the backing of Golkar and PKB, with Heri Susanto as his running mate. During his registration to run in the regency election, Sunaryanta opted to run 7.5 kilometres (4.7 mi) from his house to the General Elections Commission office, claiming that it was "a reminder on the importance of sports during a pandemic". The pair won the four-way election with 155,878 votes (33.1%), and were sworn in on 26 February 2021.

During his inaugural speech, Sunaryanta cited tourism development and investment attraction as the priorities of his tenure. His tenure saw the development of community water services to supplement the regional water company, which reached just 25 percent of users. Sunaryanta also required companies investing in Gunung Kidul to have at least 80 percent of workers be from the regency. A notable investment project was a beach club planned by actor-entrepreneur Raffi Ahmad, which was scrapped following popular opposition due to concerns over environmental damage.

In 2024, Sunaryanta attempted to run for a second term, this time with National Mandate Party (PAN) politician Mahmud Ardi Widanto as running mate. The pair was supported by PAN and five other parties without seats in the municipal legislature. In the election, Sunaryanta placed third in the three-way race with 129,716 votes (29.5%), with Endah Subekti Kuntariningsih being elected regent. Kuntariningsih was sworn in to replace Sunaryanta on 20 February 2025. After the ceremonial handover of his office on 3 March 2025, Sunaryanta made another run, measuring 8 kilometres (5.0 mi), from Gunung Kidul's cultural park to his house.

In September 2025, Sunaryanta joined the Indonesian Solidarity Party, along with a number of his 2024 campaign team. At the time of Sunaryanta's joining, the party had no registered branches in Gunung Kidul.

== Family ==
He is married to Diah Purwanti, and the couple has two sons. Their elder son Dimas Waskita Kusuma (b. 2000) graduated from the Indonesian Military Academy in 2023.
