= Soebekti Soenarto =

Indonesian politician and civil servant

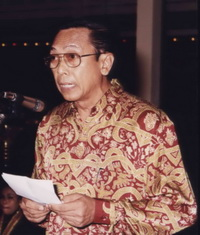
- Soenarto in 1998

22nd Regent of Gunung Kidul
- In office 13 October 1989 – November 1994
- Preceded by: KRT Sosrohadiningrat
- Succeeded by: KRT Harsodiningrat

Regional Secretary of the Special Region of Yogyakarta
- Acting
- In office 1998–2000
- Governor: Paku Alam VIII; Hamengkubuwono X
- Preceded by: Suprastowo
- Succeeded by: Bambang Susanto Priyohadi

Personal details
- Born: 1937 or 1938
- Died: 14 October 2019 (aged 81) Surakarta, Central Java, Indonesia
- Party: Golkar

Soebekti Soenarto (1937/1938 – 14 October 2019) was an Indonesian politician and civil servant. He served as the regent of Gunung Kidul Regency, Special Region of Yogyakarta between 1989 and 1994, during which he promoted greening efforts. After his tenure in Gunung Kidul, he became acting regional secretary of the province between 1998 and 2000.

== Career ==
Soenarto had a degree in agricultural science. Prior to becoming regent, Soenarto was a civil servant assigned in Kalimantan at agricultural departments, at one point becoming head of South Kalimantan's agriculture and crops department. Soenarto was sworn in as regent of Gunung Kidul on 13 October 1989. Like most civil servants during the Suharto period, he was a member of Golkar.

=== Gunung Kidul ===
During his term as regent, Soenarto made significant greening efforts in an attempt to alleviate water shortages in the regency. To promote these, he labelled the "H" in the regional slogan of "Handayani" as "Hijau" (Green), and had small monuments with Handayani acronyms erected across the regency. Soenarto was also known to walk along roads in Gunung Kidul to monitor the condition of trees lining the roadside. The greening efforts were focused in areas with groundwater basins, such as the underground Bribin River. In 1990, Soenarto also banned the sale of bonsai trees in response to the overharvesting of wild bonsai trees in Gunung Kidul during his term. The municipal government would receive a Kalpataru Award during his term for the greening efforts.

Gunung Kidul was known for high suicide rates compared to the rest of the country in the 1980s and 1990s, and Soenarto issued a directive to district heads ordering them to hold cultural and religious events in an attempt to prevent further suicides. Harsodiningrat was elected to replace him as regent on 6 October 1994.

=== Acting governor ===
After his time in Gunung Kidul, Soenarto became an assistant to the governor on economics and development. In 1998, governor Paku Alam VIII appointed Soenarto as acting regional secretary of the Yogyakarta Special Region, as the previous regional secretary Suprastowo had been elected into the provincial legislature. For a brief period between Paku Alam VIII's death on 11 September 1998 and Hamengkubuwono X's appointment as governor on 3 October 1998, Soenarto performed the duties of governor, vice governor, and regional secretary, all on an acting basis. His tenure in the position ended upon the appointment of Bambang Susanto Priyohadi as regional secretary in 2000.

== Personal life ==
Soenarto was married to Rofie Soebekti, and the couple had four children and eleven grandchildren. He lived in Surakarta, Central Java after his retirement. Soenarto died just after midnight on 14 October 2019 at the age of 81 in the Panti Waluyo Hospital of Surakarta, where he was being treated for spinal narrowing. He was buried at the Astana Bonoloyo cemetery in Surakarta.
