= Tepus, Gunungkidul =

Coordinates: 8°07′S 110°37′E

Tepus
- Kapanewon
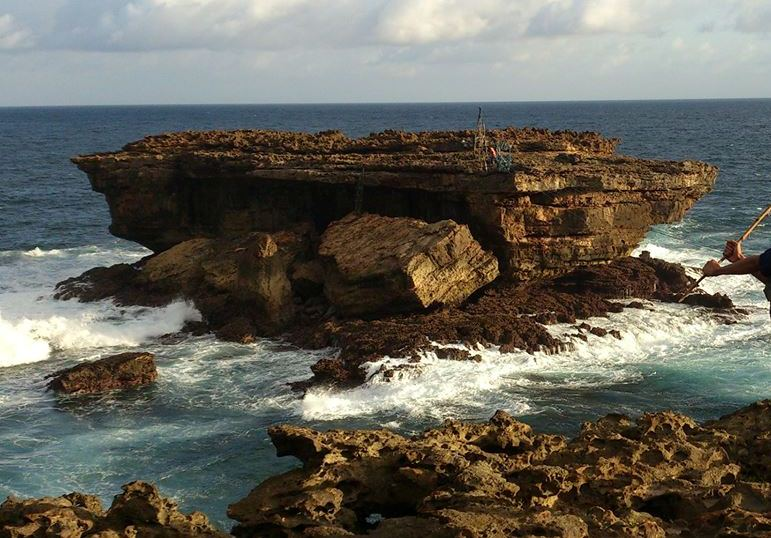
- View of Timang beach and Panjang island
- Interactive map of Tepus
- Country: Indonesia
- Province: Yogyakarta Special Region
- Regency: Gunungkidul
- Website: tepus.gunungkidulkab.go.id

Tepus is a regency district (kapanewon) of Gunung Kidul Regency, Yogyakarta Special Region, Indonesia. The boundaries of Tepus District are with Girisubo District on the east side, Semanu District on the north side, Tanjungsari on the west side and the Indian Ocean on the South side.

== Kelurahan (Administrative Village) ==
Tepus is divided into five kalurahan or administrative villages:

- Kalurahan Tepus
- Kalurahan Purwodadi
- Kalurahan Sidoarjo
- Kalurahan Sumberwungu
- Kalurahan Giri Panggung

== Demographics ==
=== Religion ===
Almost 90% of the villagers are Muslims. Islam grew slowly in the region and eventually became the only religion in this village.

=== Beach Tourism ===
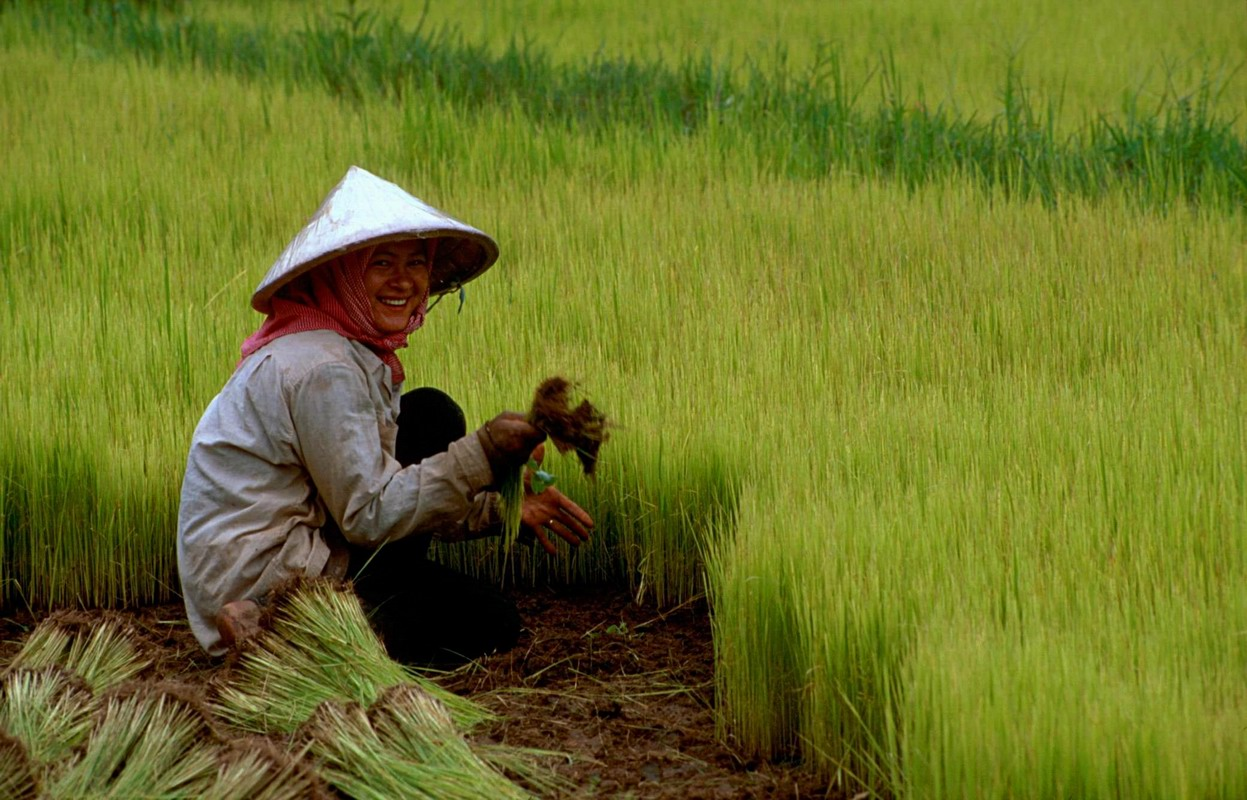
Agriculture remains the mainstay

There many beaches in this district, such as:

- Banyunibo
- Busung
- Jagang Kulon
- Jogan Beach
- Klumpit
- Nglambor Beach
- Sundak
- Ngetun
- Ngondo
- Nguluran
- Ngungap
- Pakundon
- Sawahan
- Siung Beach
- Ngandong
- Seruni
- Songlibeng
- Watutogok
- Weru
- Timang Beach
- Muncar
- Slili
- Pulang Sawal/Indrayanti
- Kelosirat
- PokTunggal

=== Transportation ===
The village is passed by the provincial road link that connects East Java - Yogyakarta - Central Java - West Java - Jakarta via the south coast route. There is a mass transportation everyday from Daksinarga Terminal in Wonosari.
