= Sumpeno Putro =

Indonesian politician (1947–2010)

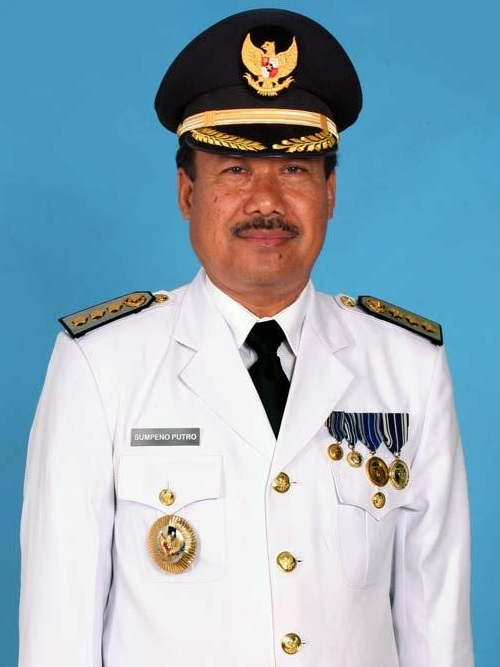
- Portrait as regent

26th Regent of Gunung Kidul
- In office 28 July 2010 – 3 November 2010
- Preceded by: Suharto
- Succeeded by: Badingah

Director General of Fisheries Products Processing and Marketing Capacity Improvement
- In office 2001 – 23 June 2005
- Preceded by: Tommy Hendra Purwaka
- Succeeded by: Martani Huseini

Personal details
- Born: 23 November 1947; Gunung Kidul, Yogyakarta Sultanate, Indonesia
- Died: 3 November 2010 (aged 62); Jakarta, Indonesia

Sumpeno Suryo Putro (23 November 1947 – 3 November 2010) was an Indonesian politician, civil servant and fisheries scientist who served as the regent of Gunung Kidul Regency from July 2010 to his death in November 2010. He had worked as a civil servant for over thirty years within the agriculture and fisheries departments before his entry into politics.

== Early life and education ==
Sumpeno Putro was born on 23 November 1947 in the village of Sanggrahan, within Ponjong district of Gunung Kidul Regency. He was the only child of Manguntaruno bin Amad Idris and Sumi binti Karsoredjo. After completing middle school in Ponjong in 1963, he studied in Yogyakarta for high school and later enrolled at Gajah Mada University in the city, where he graduated with a bachelor's degree in fisheries science in 1972. He later also received a master's degree from the Institute of Fisheries Education in Mumbai (1976) and a PhD from the School of Fishery Sciences at the University of Washington (1982).

== Career ==
Prior to his formal appointment as a civil servant, he had been working as an agricultural mentor for rice farmers within the Indonesian government's Mass Guidance Control Agency since 1971, working in Tegal Regency. He formally became a civil servant in 1974 and continued on a similar assignment in Grobogan Regency. After a stint as an advisor for the Food and Agriculture Organization in 1989–1990, he was appointed to several positions within the Ministry of Agriculture, including head of standardization and accreditation (1994–1996) and agricultural attache to the European Union (1996–2001). Throughout his career, he also lectured at a number of public and private universities.

Between 2001 and 2005, he served as Director General for Marketing and Institutional Capacity-Building within the Ministry of Marine Affairs and Fisheries. During his tenure as Director General, Indonesia faced dumping accusations for shrimp exports to the United States, and Putro took part in lobbying efforts to lift restrictions. He was replaced by Martani Huseini as director general on 23 June 2005. In 2007, after his tenure in the ministry had ended, he was questioned as a witness by the Corruption Eradication Commission over an investigation into former minister Rokhmin Dahuri.

In 2010, Putro ran for the regency of Gunung Kidul, with the backing of the National Mandate Party (PAN). The incumbent regent Suharto also sought PAN's support, but the party's local branch voted to nominate Putro instead. With incumbent vice regent Badingah as his running mate, the pair managed to secure 146,849 votes (36%) and won the election, defeating Suharto who instead ran with the backing of PDI-P and PKB. They were sworn in on 28 July 2010.

One of Putro's campaign promises included inviting the Italian ambassador to Indonesia to Gunung Kidul in order to promote the regency's wood exports within 30 days of him being sworn in. Putro further promoted exports of Gunung Kidul's wood products to Australia. He also held an open house event where he promoted peaceful inter-religious relations in September 2010.

== Death ==
Starting on 31 October 2010, Putro took part in an orientation course for regional leaders held by the Ministry of Home Affairs in Pontianak. When he returned via Jakarta on 3 November and stayed at the ministry's hostel, he began to suffer from breathing difficulties and fainted. He was rushed to the Medistra Hospital in Jakarta, where he was pronounced dead. His cause of death was attributed to a heart attack induced by exhaustion. His body was returned to Gunung Kidul where he was buried the following day. Putro's funeral was attended by high-ranking officials in the province including Sultan Hamengkubuwono X and other regents, along with PAN's leader Amien Rais.
