= Martani Huseini =

Indonesian academic (born 1951)

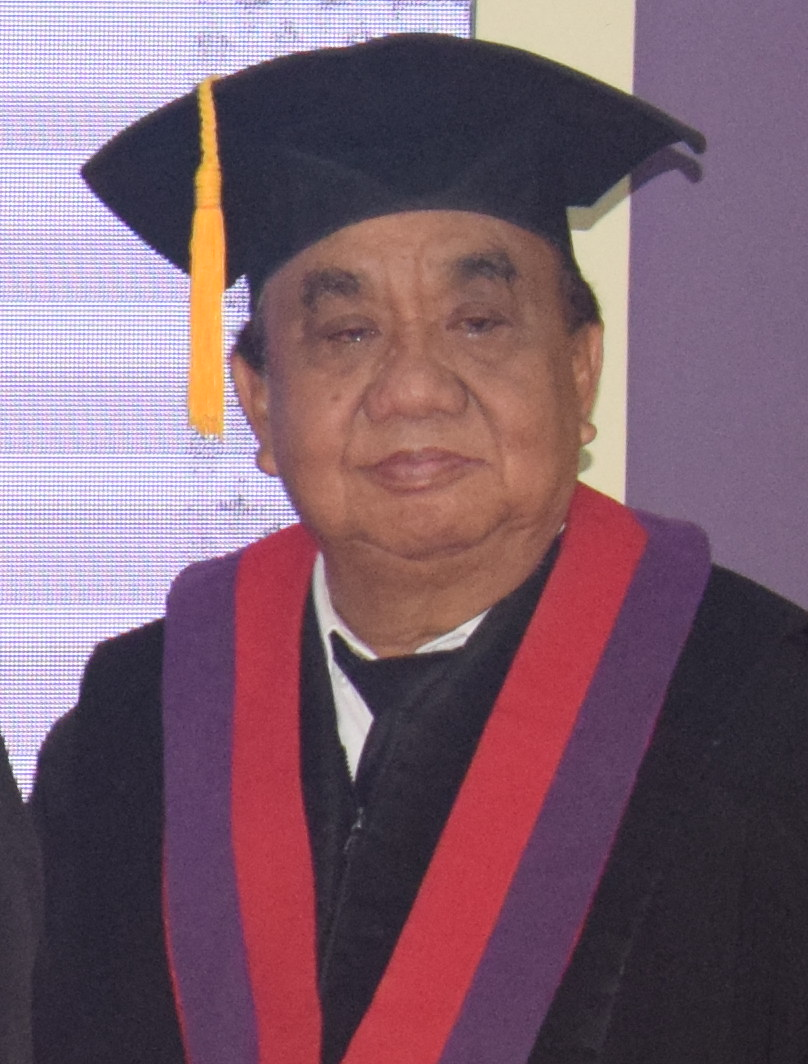

Director General of Fisheries Products Processing and Marketing
- In office 23 June 2005 – 14 Februari 2011
- Preceded by: Sumpeno Putro
- Succeeded by: Victor Nikijuluw

Deputy Rector for Institutional Affairs and Ventures of the University of Indonesia
- In office 11 October 2002 – 23 June 2005
- Preceded by: office established
- Succeeded by: office dissolved

Dean of the Faculty of Social and Political Sciences of the University of Indonesia
- In office 2001 – 11 October 2002
- Preceded by: Kamanto Sunarto
- Succeeded by: Gumilar Rusliwa Somantri

Personal details
- Born: 7 March 1951 (age 75) Kediri, East Java, Indonesia
- Education: University of Indonesia; Aix-Marseille University; Paris-Sorbonne University

Martani Huseini (born 7 March 1951) is an Indonesian academic, bureaucrat, and professor of international marketing at the University of Indonesia. He served as the deputy rector of the University of Indonesia from 2002 to 2005 and the director general of fisheries product processing and marketing from 2005 to 2011.

== Education ==
Born in Kediri on 7 March 1951, Martani initially wanted to study physics at the University of Indonesia, but he majored in business administration instead because he lacked sufficient funds to pay his tuition for the former major. During his studies, he took a side job as a taxi driver for Bluebird Group until he received a scholarship in his second year. He received his bachelor's degree from the university in 1977. He then continued his education to the Aix-Marseille University where he received his master's in company management in 1980 and in applied economy in 1981. He received his doctorate in international marketing from the Paris-Sorbonne University in 1983.

== Academic career ==
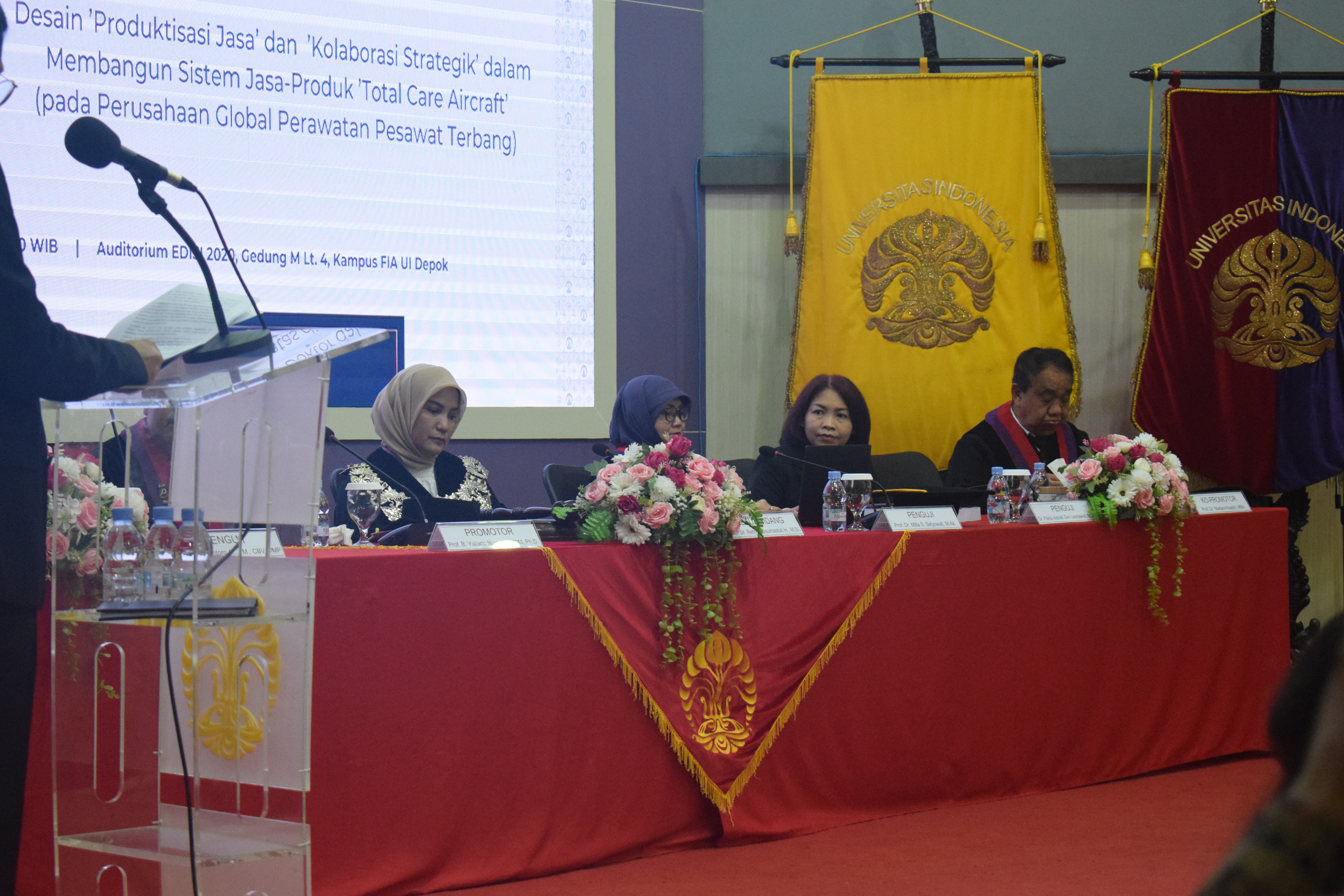
Martani (far right) at a thesis defense.

Martani taught at the administrative department of the University of Indonesia's faculty of social and political sciences. Outside the department, he also taught at the university's economics faculty and other universities such as the Bandung Institute of Technology, University of Riau, Brawijaya University, University of Jember, and Cenderawasih University. He held a number of administrative positions in the faculty and the university. From 1996 to 2001, he was the third deputy to the director of UI's postgraduate program, before being named as the faculty's dean in 2001. Prior to becoming dean, he was appointed as a full professor in international marketing in 1999, with his inaugural professor speech being read on 25 September 1999.

In 2002, he was one of the fourteen candidates for the first post-autonomy rector of the University of Indonesia. After facing a series of voting by the election committee, academic senate, and the board of trustees, Martani faced the acting rector, Usman Chatib Warsa, in the final stage of the election. During the debates, Martani pledged to involve students as equal partners in campus policymaking, including tuition. He eventually lost the final election to Usman by a one-vote margin.

Usman then appointed Martani as his fifth deputy, responsible for institutional affairs and ventures, on 11 October that year. As the deputy rector responsible for institutional affairs and ventures, Martani oversaw cooperation between the university and the Harvard University and launching of the university's public television. He also established the Daya Makara company, a company owned by the university, and became its president director. He later assumed office as member of the Indonesian Broadcasting Commission. In 2005, the university's administration was streamlined, and the office of the third, fourth, and fifth deputy rector were abolished.

== Government career ==
Shortly after the abolition, Martani moved to the government. On 26 May 2005, Martani became the member of the supervisory board of the state radio after passing an assessment by the House of Representatives. Less than a month later, on 23 June Martani was installed as the director general of fisheries product processing and marketing by minister of marine affairs and fisheries Freddy Numberi.

Early in his tenure as director general, Martani faced U.S. Customs and Border Protection investigation on ten Indonesian export companies suspected of transshipping Chinese shrimps. In response to the allegations, Martani stated that the Indonesian government had already closed shrimp import channels and extended the import ban. In conjunction with pressures from the fisheries association, the department of marine affairs and fisheries launched their own investigation. Martani, along with other government officials, was sent to the United States to negotiate and prevent embargo from the United States.

Following the issue, Indonesia was faced with another possible embargo, this time coming from the European Union (EU). The EU issued a final warning to Indonesia over the health and quality standards of its fishery products and threatened embargo if improvements were not made as soon as possible. The issue was worsened with a ban on Indonesian flights to cross EU airspace. He was then sent to the EU headquarters in Brussels along with officials from the Department of Trade to promote Indonesian exports and prevent the embargo from being implemented.

Martani retired from his office as director general on 14 Februari 2011 and was replaced with Victor Nikijuluw, who had previously served as director for business and investment under him. Shortly after his retirement, Martani criticized the appointment of deputy ministers by President Susilo Bambang Yudhoyono, claiming that it caused the cabinet to grow overly large and inefficient and suggested the president to issue presidential regulation to clearly define the duties and operational scope of deputy ministers.

== Later life ==
Martani returned to academia and held a number of faculty and university positions, including chairman of the Center for Innovative Governance cluster under the faculty of administrative sciences and a member of the third committee of the council of professors of the university, responsible for supervising researches, majors, and doctoral programme evaluation. He also became an advisor to the business administration department in the Brawijaya University and chairman of the Interstudi Communications School sometime in the 2020s.

Outside the academia, Martani chaired several fishery associations, including the Indonesian Tuna Association and the Indonesian Association for Eel Farming. In January 2020, Martani was appointed as advisor to the Minister of Maritime Affairs and Fisheries Edhy Prabowo for the processing and marketing of fisheries products.
