= Siung Beach =

- Location Java Island
- Coordinates: 8°10′55″S 110°40′58″E
- Country: Indonesia
- Province: Yogyakarta Special Region
- City: Gunungkidul

Pantai Siung is one of tourism located in Kecamatan Tepus, precisely located in Dusun Duwet, Kelurahan Purwodadi, Kecamatan Tepus, Gunungkidul Regency, Province Yogyakarta Special Region. It is about 77 km from Yogyakarta and have an adventure travel locations such as rock climbing with 250 international track.

Along the way to the beach, visitors will be treated with views of limestone hills covered with teak trees. The road to Siung Beach is ascending. The beach with white sand and the sound waves, makes the mind calm.

Because the beach is very secluded, amenities available mash was minimal, only available parking area, toilet, and stall . For hotel accommodation is not available here, but if you want to spend the night in Siung, you can use the cottage climber that looks like a house on stilts with a capacity of approximately 20 people . If you want to spend the night with Nature, you can bring your own tents that you can use around the cliffs .

If you are from the Yogyakarta city, you can use the path of Yogyakarta - Wonosari - Tepus - Kelurahan Purwodadi - Siung . If you use public transportation, you can use the bus from the Giwangan Bus Terminal at Yogyakarta to Wonosari. Wonosari arriving at the Dhaksinarga terminal, you can use public transportation from Wonosari - Purwodadi, you can use a motorcycle taxi, because the only public transportation that can be used to Siung .
