= Wonosari =

- Kapanewon
- Location in Java and Indonesia Wonosari (Indonesia)
- Coordinates: 7.966680°S 110.602561°E
- Country: Indonesia
- Region: Java
- Province: Yogyakarta
- Regency: Gunung Kidul Regency

Area
  - Total: 75.51 km^{2} (29.15 sq mi)

Population (2020 Census)
  - Total: 87,454
  - Density: 1,158/km^{2} (3,000/sq mi)
- Time zone: UTC+7 (IWST)
- Area code: (+62) 274
- Vehicle registration: AB
- Villages: 14
- Website: wonosari.gunungkidulkab.go.id

Wonosari (Javanese: ꦮꦤꦱꦫꦶ, romanized: Wanasari) is the administrative centre of Gunungkidul Regency, in the Special Region of Yogyakarta on Java, Indonesia. The kapanewon (district) of Wonosari is bordered to the north by the district of Nglipar, to the east by the districts of Karangmojo and Semanu, to the south by the district of Tanjungsari, and to the west by the districts of Paliyan and Playen (to the west of Yogyakarta). It had a population of 87,454 as of the 2020 Census.

== Education ==
There are many schools in the town of Wonosari. The most popular ones are Wonosari Baru Elementary School, Wonosari 1 Junior High School, and Wonosari 1 High School. There is also Wonosari 2 High School. The education level is mid-high depends on the school quality (like the teacher ability, the student's impact, facility, etc.) The schools in Wonosari are mostly managed by Disdikpora Gunungkidul or Dinas Pendidikan dan Olahraga Gunungkidul, located in Jl. Pemuda No.227, Rejosari, Wonosari, Kec. Wonosari, Kabupaten Gunungkidul, Daerah Istimewa Yogyakarta 55851.

== Climate ==
Wonosari has a tropical monsoon climate (Am) with moderate to little rainfall from June to October and heavy to very heavy rainfall from November to May.

Climate data for Wonosari
Month	Jan	Feb	Mar	Apr	May	Jun	Jul	Aug	Sep	Oct	Nov	Dec	Year
Mean daily maximum °C (°F)	29.1 (84.4)	29.4 (84.9)	29.7 (85.5)	30.6 (87.1)	30.3 (86.5)	30.2 (86.4)	29.5 (85.1)	30.0 (86.0)	30.4 (86.7)	30.8 (87.4)	30.0 (86.0)	29.5 (85.1)	30.0 (85.9)
Daily mean °C (°F)	25.7 (78.3)	25.8 (78.4)	25.9 (78.6)	26.4 (79.5)	26.1 (79.0)	25.4 (77.7)	24.7 (76.5)	25.0 (77.0)	25.7 (78.3)	26.3 (79.3)	26.0 (78.8)	25.9 (78.6)	25.7 (78.3)
Mean daily minimum °C (°F)	22.3 (72.1)	22.2 (72.0)	22.2 (72.0)	22.3 (72.1)	21.9 (71.4)	20.7 (69.3)	20.0 (68.0)	20.0 (68.0)	21.1 (70.0)	21.9 (71.4)	22.1 (71.8)	22.3 (72.1)	21.6 (70.9)
Average rainfall mm (inches)	346 (13.6)	354 (13.9)	304 (12.0)	157 (6.2)	130 (5.1)	56 (2.2)	46 (1.8)	32 (1.3)	28 (1.1)	102 (4.0)	194 (7.6)	283 (11.1)	2,032 (79.9)
Source: Climate-Data.org
