= Gunung Kidul Regency =

Regency in Yogyakarta, Indonesia

Gunůngkidůl Regency ꦑꦧꦸꦥꦠꦺꦤ꧀ꦓꦸꦤꦸꦁꦏꦶꦢꦸꦭ꧀ Kabupatèn Gunůngkidůl
- Regency
- Gunůngkidůl Handayani
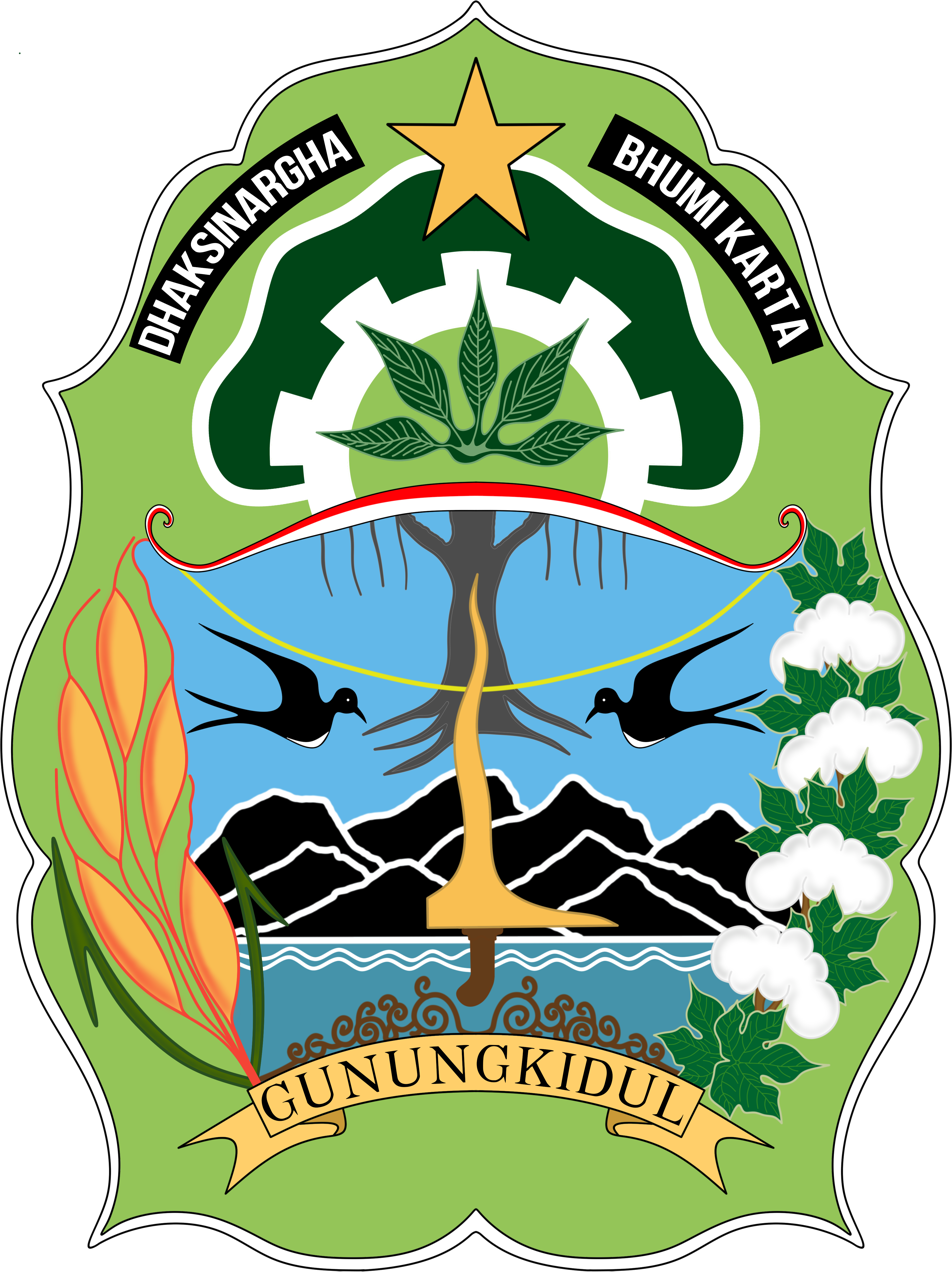
- Seal
- Nicknames: Thousands Mount Regency (Kabupatèn Pĕgunungan Sèwu), Gathot Regency (Kabupatèn Gathot), Thiwul Production Regency (Kabupatèn Pembuat Thiwul), River Caves Regency (Kabupatèn Sungai Bawah Tanah), Chalk Mount Regency (Kabupatèn Gunůng Kapur)
- Motto(s): Dhaksinarga Bhumikarta (Southern Mountain the Prosperous Land)
- Gunůngkidůl Regency in Special Province of Daerah Istimewa Yogyakarta
- Coordinates: 7°57′54″S 110°36′0″E
- Country: Indonesia
- Special Administrative Region: Yogyakarta
- Capital: Wonosari

Government
  - Regent: Endah Subekti Kuntariningsih
  - Vice Regent: Joko Parwoto

Area
  - Total: 1,475.15 km^{2} (569.56 sq mi)

Population (mid 2023 estimate)
  - Total: 751,011
  - Density: 509.108/km^{2} (1,318.58/sq mi)
- Time zone: UTC+7 (WIB)
- Post Code: 55800
- Area code: 0274
- Vehicle registration: AB
- Website: gunungkidulkab.go.id

Gunůngkidůl (Javanese: ꧋ ꦒꦸꦤꦸꦁꦏꦶꦢꦸꦭ꧀ ꧉) is a regency located in the Special Region of Yogyakarta, Indonesia. The administrative centre is the town of Wonosari. The name "Gunungkidul" comes from the Javanese language mountains in the south of Java Land, whose area is located in the Thousands Mountains range of the province.

The Regency covers an area of 1,475.15 km^{2}, about 46.5% of the provincial area. It had a population of 675,382 at the 2010 Census and 747,161 at the 2020 Census; the official estimate as of mid-2023 was 751,011 - with 371,220 males and 379,800 females - and so the population density in this regency is relatively low compared to other regencies of the province.

This regency is bordered by Klaten Regency and Sukoharjo Regency in the north and northeast, Wonogiri Regency in the east, the Indian Ocean in the south, and Bantul Regency and Sleman Regency in the west and northwest. Gunungkidul Regency has 18 Districts (Kapanewon). Most of the regency is hills and limestone mountains, which are part of the Thousand Mountains. Gunungkidul is known as a relatively barren area and often experiences drought in the dry season, but it has a unique historical feature, in addition to its tourism, cultural and culinary potential.

The traditional dishes from Gunůngkidůl include "Gathot" and "Thiwul", made from fermented cassava and dry cassava.

Its southern coast has several beaches: Baron, Kukup, Krakal, Drini, Sepanjang, Sundak, Siung, Wediombo, Jungwok, Greweng, Sedahan and Sadeng. Some of these provide fish and other sea products supplied by local fisherman. The most notable is Baron Beach, which has an adjacent park surrounded by seafood restaurants and hostels. There is a fresh fish market on the east side of the beach. On the west side, a river flows from an almost sea-level cave on the side of the western ridge. The beach itself is khaki-colored and is used to land traditional fishing boats. There is also a kilometer of white sandy beach beyond its eastern ridge, reachable by a small hike.

== Geography ==
As the name implies, Gunungkidul Regency is dominated by mountains which are the western part of the Sewu Mountains or the South Limestone Mountains (from this nickname, the name "Gunungkidul" is derived), which stretches across the southern part of Java Island starting from the area eastward to Tulungagung Regency.

The Mountains are formed from limestone, indicating that in the past it was a seabed. The findings of ancient marine animal fossils support this assumption. This area began to become land as a result of tectonic and volcanic uplifts since the Miocene.

Gunungkidul Regency is one of the regencies in the Daerah Istimewa Yogyakarta Special Province, with Wonosari as the capital city. The total area of Gunungkidul Regency is 1,475.15 km2 or about 46.5% of the total area of the Special Province of Daerah Istimewa Yogyakarta. The city of Wonosari is located southeast of the Yogyakarta City (the capital of Daerah Istimewa Yogyakarta Special Province), with a distance of ± 39 km. The Gunungkidul Regency area is divided into 18 Districts (Kapanewon) and 144 villages.

== Administrative districts ==
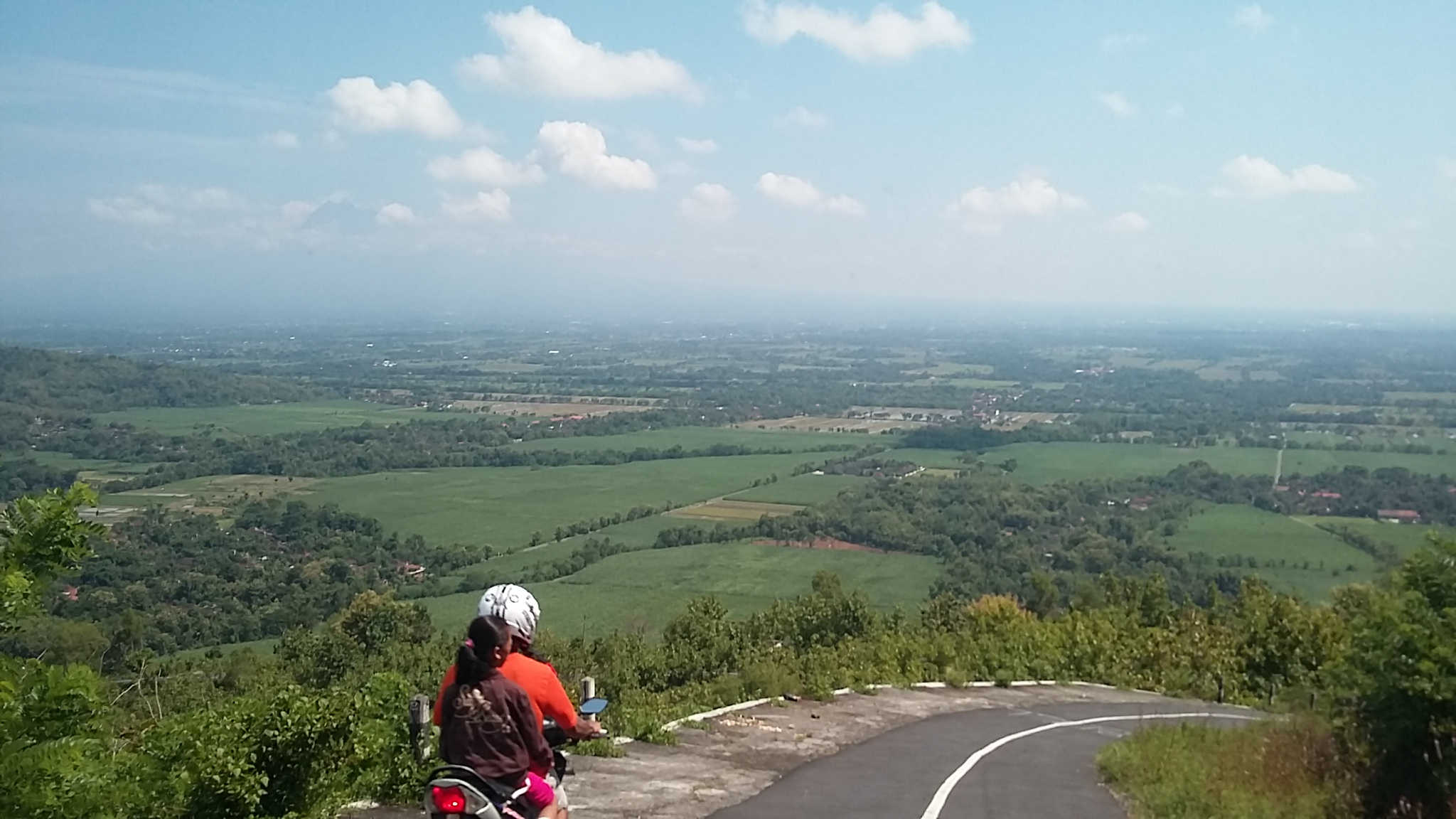
A view taken from a hill in Gunungkidul Regency, Yogyakarta

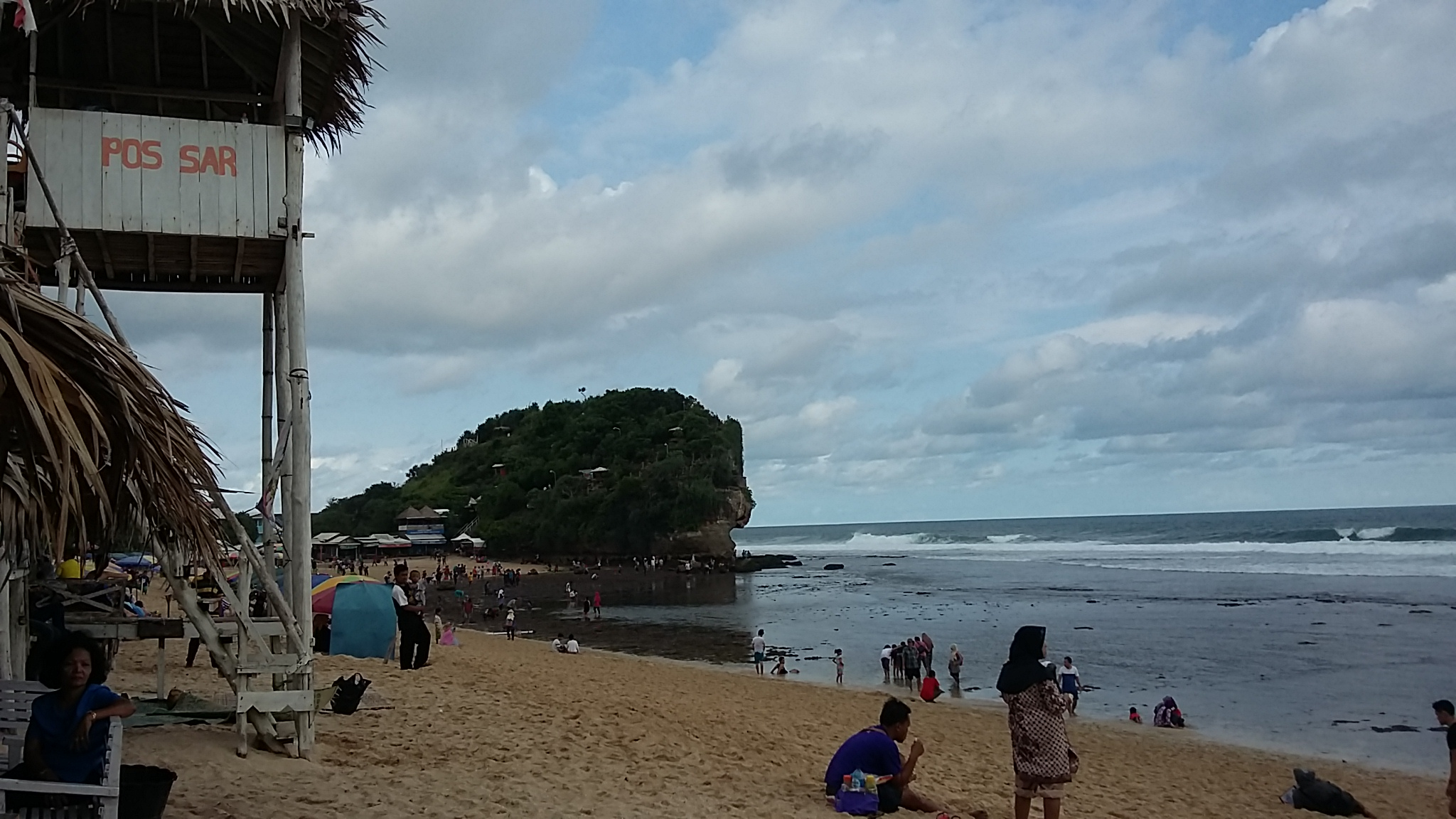
Indrayanti Beach, a scenic beach in Gunungkidul, known for its waves and similar island with Tanah Lot in Bali

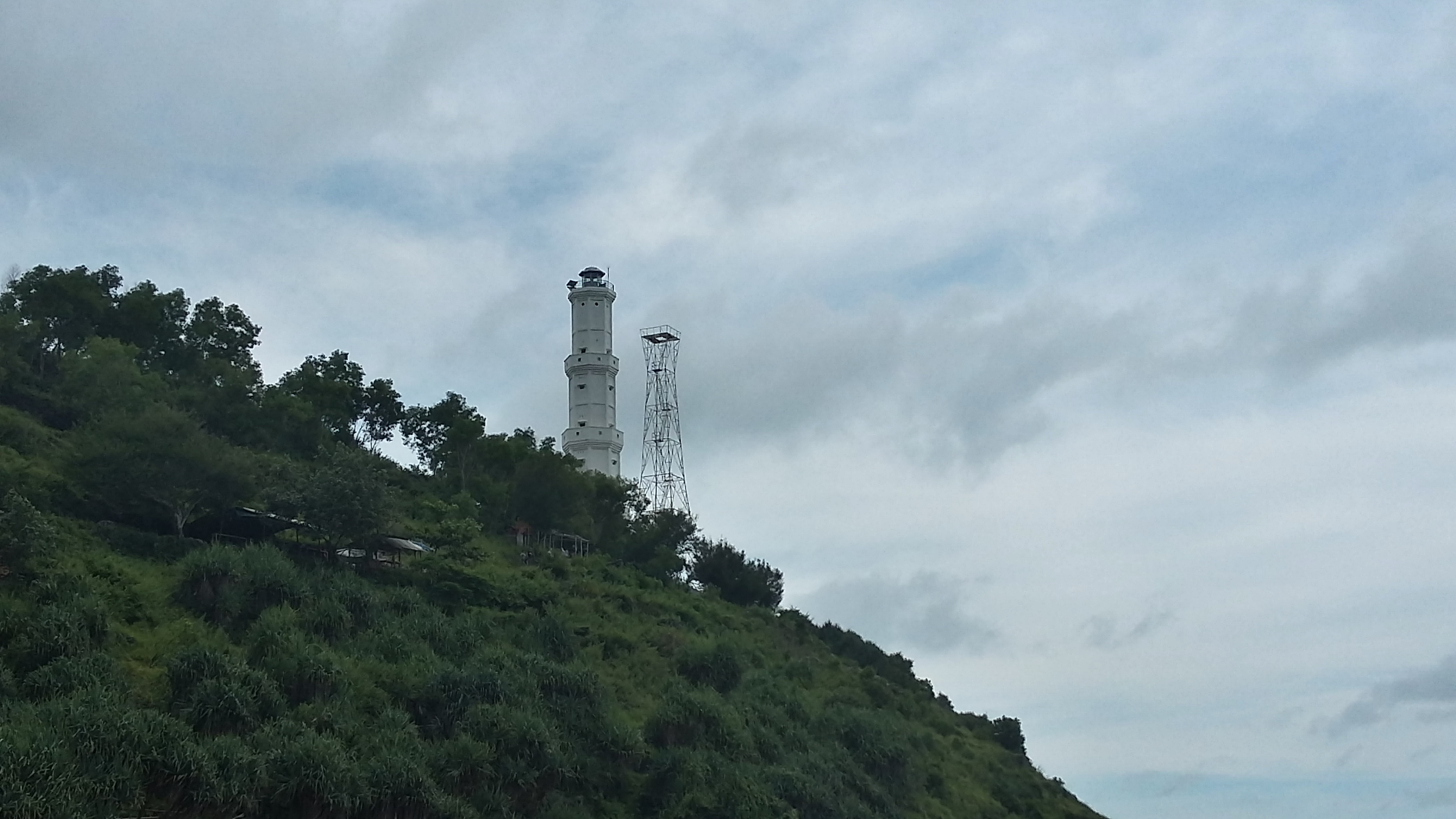
An abandoned lighthouse (now operated as a tourist photo spots) in Baron Beach, Gunungkidul, Yogyakarta

Gunungkidul Regency is divided into eighteen administrative districts (Indonesian: kapanewon), tabulated below with their areas and their populations at the 2010 Census and the 2020 Census, together with the official estimates as of mid-2023. The table also includes the locations of the district administrative centres, the number of administrative villages within each district (all classed as kalurahan), and its post codes.

Kode Wilayah	Name of District (kapanewon)	Area in km^{2}	Pop'n Census 2010	Pop'n Census 2020	Pop'n Estimate mid 2023	Admin centre	No. of villages	Post code
34.03.06	Panggang ꦥꦁꦒꦁ	99.80	26,509	28,951	29,121	Giriharjo	8	55872
34.03.18	Purwosari ꦥꦸꦂꦮꦱꦫꦶ	71.76	19,361	20,655	20,793	Giritirto	5	55873
34.03.05	Paliyan ꦥꦭꦶꦪꦤ꧀	58.07	29,083	32,017	32,181	Karangduwet	7	55871
34.03.15	Saptosari ꦱꦥ꧀ꦠꦱꦫꦶ	87.83	34,270	38,323	38,500	Kepek	7	55870
34.03.07	Tepus ꦠꦼꦥꦸꦱ꧀	104.91	31,889	35,251	35,296	Sidoharjo	5	55882
34.03.17	Tanjungsari ꦠꦚ꧀ꦗꦸꦁꦱꦫꦶ	71.63	25,698	28,178	28,323	Kemiri	5	55881
34.03.11	Rongkop ꦫꦺꦴꦁꦏꦺꦴꦥ꧀	83.46	26,901	28,610	28,724	Semugih	8	55884
34.03.16	Girisubo ꦒꦶꦫꦶꦱꦸꦧ	94.57	22,188	24,490	24,589	Jerukwudel	8	55883
34.03.08	Semanu ꦱꦼꦩꦤꦸ	108.39	51,737	58,155	58,697	Semanu	5	55893
34.03.10	Ponjong ꦥꦺꦴꦚ꧀ꦗꦺꦴꦁ	104.49	49,803	54,487	54,769	Ponjong	11	55892
34.03.09	Karangmojo ꦏꦫꦁꦩꦗ	80.12	48,768	55,419	55,935	Gedangrejo	9	55891
34.03.01	Wonosari ꦮꦤꦱꦫꦶ	75.51	78,747	87,454	87,684	Kepek	14	55851 ^{(a)}
34.03.03	Playen ꦥ꧀ꦭꦪꦺꦤ꧀	105.26	54,492	60,622	60,811	Ngawu	13	55861
34.03.04	Patuk ꦥꦛꦸꦏ꧀	72.04	30,336	34,156	34,382	Patuk	11	55862
34.03.14	Gedangsari ꦒꦼꦣꦁꦱꦫꦶ	68.14	35,265	38,389	38,567	Hargomulyo	7	55863
34.03.02	Nglipar ꦔ꧀ꦭꦶꦥꦂ	73.87	29,687	32,764	32,790	Nglipar	7	55852
34.03.13	Ngawen ꦔꦮꦺꦤ꧀	46.59	31,622	33,908	34,111	Kampung	6	55853
34.03.12	Semin ꦱꦼꦩꦶꦤ꧀	78.92	49,026	55,332	55,737	Semin	10	55854
	Totals	1,475.15	675,382	747,161	751,011	Wonosari	144	

Note: (a) except the villages of Baleharjo (which has a post code of 55811) and Kepek (which has a post code of 55813).

== General condition ==
=== Geography ===
Gunungkidul Regency is in a karst region. This leads to difficult geography for farmers and contributes to considerable poverty in the area because of water shortages. Much of the Regency is included in the Mount Sewu (literally "thousand mountains") collection of limestone hills which stretches across parts of southern Java from parts of Kebumen Regency in the west near the border with West Java across to close to the city of Malang in East Java. The Menoreh Hills in the area south of Yogyakarta in Kulonprogo Regency, for example, are part of this series of limestone hills.

=== Caves ===
The limestone hills are reported to contain hundreds of caves. These are classified locally as vertical luweng (known as "luweng" in Javanese) and horizontal caves. Jomblang Cave (Luweng Jomblang) and Kalisuci Cave (Luweng Kalisuci) located in the Semanu District in Gunungkidul Regency, as well as other caves in the area, are well-known to local caving (speleological) groups. Some of the caves are quite long; Cerme cave, for example, has an entrance in Bantul Regency and stretches for quite a distance eastward into Panggang subdistrict in Gunungkidul Regency.

=== Prehistory ===
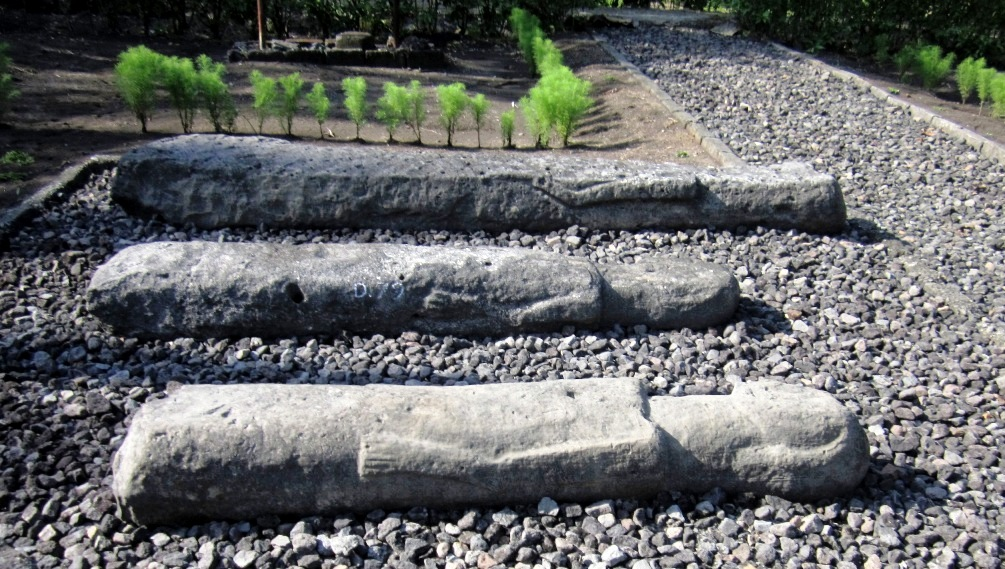
Statue menhirs from Gunungkidul

From archaeological findings, the area of Gunungkidul Regency is thought to have been inhabited by humans (Homo Sapiens) from 700,000 years ago. Many find the instructions of human existence found in caves and niches in karst of Gunungkidul, especially in Ponjong District. The human propensity Gunung occupy the time it caused most of the lowland in Yogyakarta is still flooded. The arrival of the first humans in Gunungkidul occurred at the end of the Pleistocene epoch. At that time, the human race Australoid migrated from the Pegunungan Sewu in Pacitan, East Java passing Wonogiri karst valleys, Central Java until it reaches the southern coast of Gunungkidul through ancient, Bengawan Solo.

=== Borderline ===
- North: Klaten, Sukoharjo, Sleman
- West: Imogiri, Pundong, Dlingo, Piyungan
- South: Indian Ocean
- East: Wonogiri

=== Culture ===
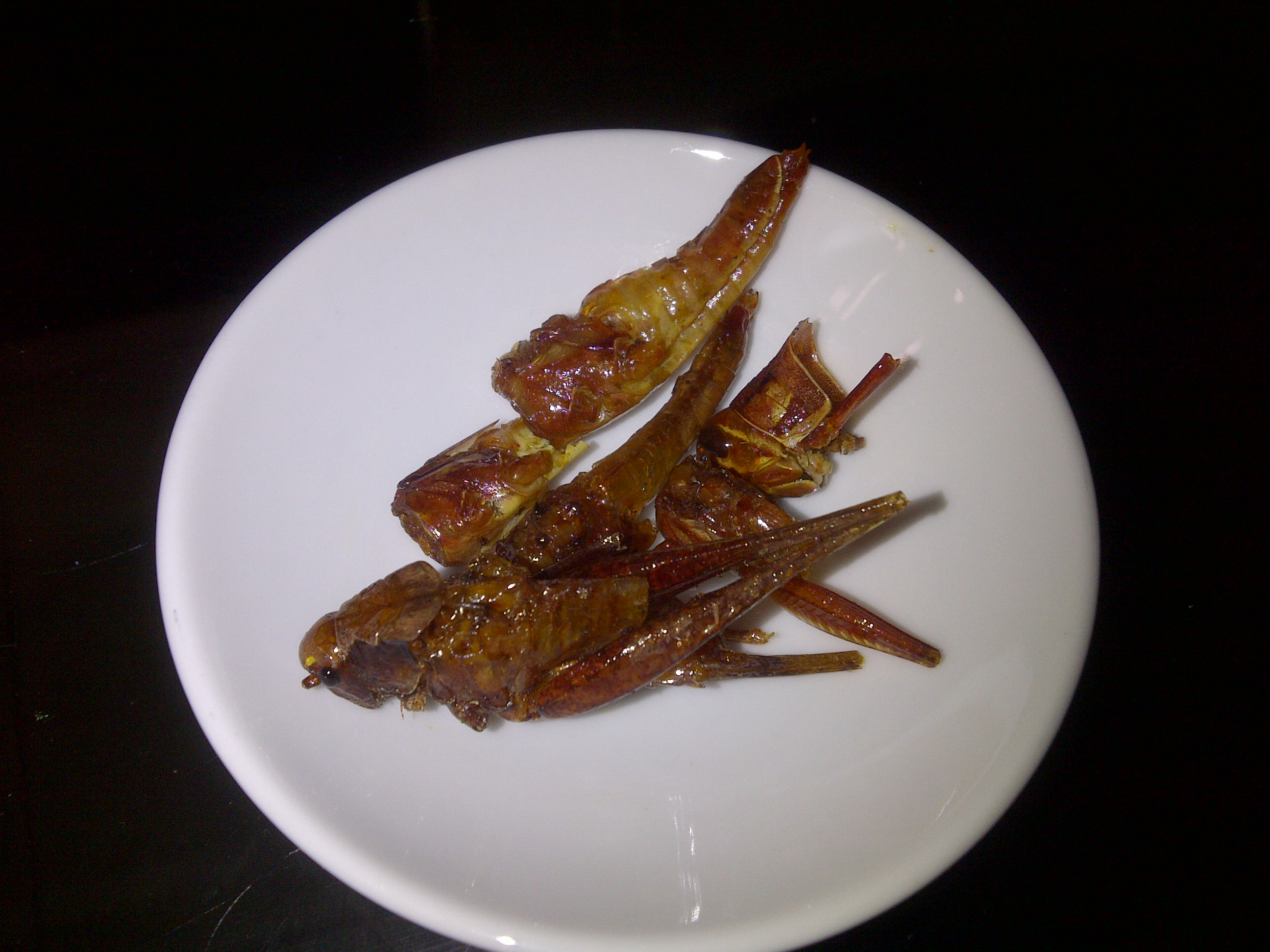
Walang goreng (fried grasshoppers)

Gunungkidul Regency is located in the limestone uplands of Java, thus soils are not very good for growing rice. Cassava replaced rice in this area. Some famous Gunungkidul cuisine includes thiwul, gathot (both are cassava-based food) and a delicacy called walang goreng (fried grasshoppers).

== Topography ==
=== North Zone ===
The northern zone is called Agung Batur region, with an altitude of 200–700 m above sea level. The situation is hilly, there are sources of groundwater depth of 6m - 12m from the ground. Latosol soil types dominated by volcanic and sedimentary parent hurricane stones. This area includes the districts of Patuk, Gedangsari, Nglipar, Ngawen, Semin, and the northern part of the district of Ponjong.

=== Central Zone ===
The Central Zone is called Ledok Wonosari development, with an altitude of 150–200 m above sea level. The soil type is dominated by Mediterranean association with the red and black grumusol limestone. So despite its long dry season, the water particles are still able to survive. There is a river on the land. Groundwater depth ranges between 60–120 m below the ground surface. This area includes the districts of Playen, Wonosari, Karangmojo and Ponjong, and the central and northern parts of Semanu.

=== South Zone ===
The Southern Zone is called Pegunungan Sewu development area (Duizon gebergton or Zuider gebergton), with an altitude of 0–300 m above sea level. Constituent bedrock is limestone with characteristic conical hills (Conical limestone) and the karst area. Underground rivers are often found in this region. The southern zone includes the districts of Saptosari, Paliyan, Girisubo, Tanjungsari, Tepus, Rongkop, Purwosari and Panggang, and the southern parts of Ponjong and Semanu.

== Climatology ==
Gunungkidul regency including tropical area, the topography of a region dominated by karst region area. The southern region is dominated by karst region, that are numerous natural caves and underground rivers flowing. Under these conditions cause the condition of the land in the southern area which resulted in less fertile agricultural cultivation in this region is less than optimal. Gunungkidul climatological conditions generally exhibit the following conditions:

- The average rainfall in 2010 amounted to 1954.43 mm/year with the number of rainy days an average of 103 days/year. Wet months 7 months, while the dry months range from 5 months. Gunungkidul north region has the highest rainfall over central and southern regions. Gunungkidul southern region has the most rain beginning late
- Temperatures daily average of 27.7 °C, minimum temperature of 23.2 °C and a maximum temperature of 35 °C.
- Relative humidity ranging between 80% - 85%, not too influenced by the high places, but more influenced by the seasons.

== Heirloom ==
=== Tombak Kyai Marga Salurung ===
Tombak Kyai Marga Salurung is one of heirloom gift from the King of Yogyakarta, Hamengkubuwono X on Sunday, May 27, 2001, when the Celebration of 170th Anniversary of Gunungkidul Regency. Spear heirloom that has a new dhapur cekel, warangka kajeng sanakeling symbolize that the district government of Gunungkidul still has a major commitment to achieve ideals are deeply rooted and always siding with the people. The leaders and the people have the attitude or the direction salurung approval, accord, saiyeg - saeka- kapti in the corridors of democracy, which means heavy hands make light work, conscious of their rights, but also respect the rights of others and known for certain obligations.

== UNESCO Geopark ==
Gunungkidul Regency and the nearby Imogiri area (in Bantul Regency) and Pacitan Regency (East Java Province) is being promoted by the Indonesia government to be a UNESCO Geopark, due to their unique and scenic karst landscape. An accessor from UNESCO has visited 4 areas in July 2014. These include:

- Pindul Cave, in tectonic active area, the cave and the Gunungkidul Karst Region give more variation of karst stone/land, if it is compared with Gunung Sewu area in Pacitan and Wonogiri
- Nglanggeran Primeval Volcano
- Gunung Batur Primeval Volcano
- Bobung Tourism Village
- Siung Beach

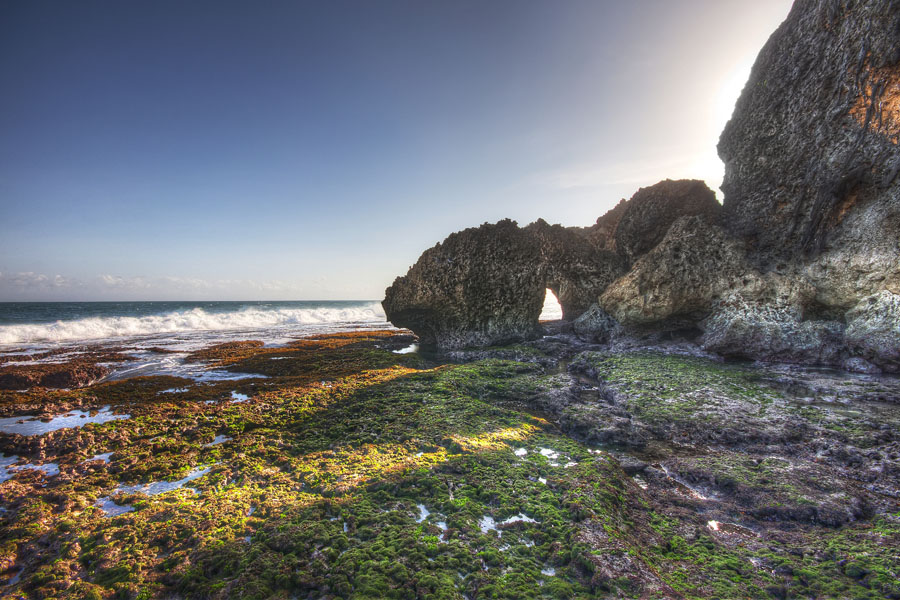
A halo at Ngobaran beach, one of many scenic beaches in Gunungkidul Regency

As a karst region, Gunungkidul Regency has many caves, some of which have underground rivers. At least two of them (Pindul Cave in the Bejiharjo area and Kalisuci Cave in the Semanu area) are regarded as tourist sites where tubing activities can be carried on.

Nglanggeran primeval volcano in the Patuk area is only 600 meters high but there are excellent views from the peak to the north towards Mount Merapi and to the south across to the coast of Java. Scattered giant granite and andesite rock formations called "watu wayang" (puppet rocks) are found at the Mt Nglanggeran area as well as a nearby man-made lake. It takes around 3 hours to hike from the Pendopo Kali Song entrance point to the peak.

Siung Beach Bay is about 300 meters in length, but swimming is prohibited because of dangerous rocks and severe waves. The cliff surrounding the beach, with over 200 tracks, is suitable for rock climbing.

200 meters east of Siung Beach there is a 10-meter Jogan Tide Fall in Tepus district which is 70 kilometers from Yogyakarta in 2 hours drive. Rainy season is the best time to see the Jogan Tide Fall, because in the dry season, the water level is low.
