= Cikampek–Cirebon Prujakan railway =

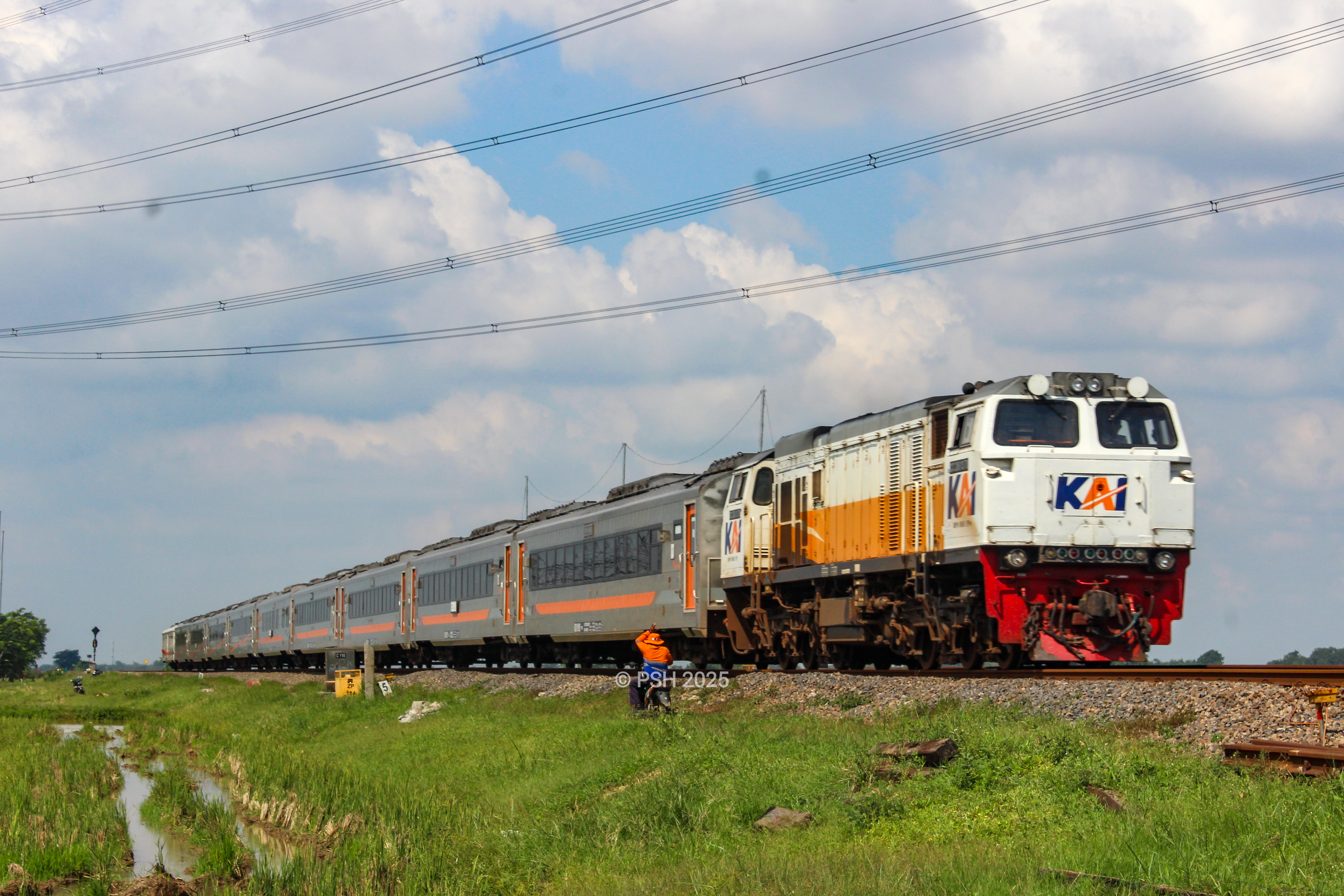
- 99 Harina prepare passing Tanjungrasa station in the Cikampek–Cirebon Prujakan railway line, May 2025

Overview
- Native name: Jalur kereta api Cikampek–Cirebon Prujakan
- Status: Operational
- Owner: Directorate General of Railways (DJKA)
- Locale: Cikampek-Cirebon, West Java
- Termini: Cikampek; Cirebon Prujakan
- Stations: 21

Service
- Type: Inter-city rail
- Operator: PT Kereta Api Indonesia

History
- Opened: 1912

Technical
- Number of tracks: 2
- Track gauge: 1,067 mm (3 ft 6 in)
- Electrification: not available

The Cikampek–Cirebon Prujakan railway (Indonesian: Jalur kereta api Cikampek–Cirebon Prujakan) is a railway line that connects Cikampek and Cirebon Prujakan that opened in 1912 then continued to Semarang Tawang. This route crosses on province with 4 regencies or cities, namely Cikampek,Indramayu Regency, Cirebon Regency, and Cirebon.

This lines part of the Cikampek-Cirebon-Semarang Tawang railway line, also the busiest intercity line between Cikampek and Cirebon due Double-track railway. This line is included in Jakarta Operations Area I at Cikampek Station only, while Cirebon Operations Area III is in the Pangulah Simpang—Brebes station segment.

This railway line connects DKI Jakarta and its buffer areas with Cikampek and Cirebon, West Java.

== History ==
=== Begin Construction ===
A proposal for a railway to Cirebon was submitted by the Bataviasche Oosterspoorweg Maatschappij (BOS) once the Jakarta–Karawang segment was completed. However, this proposal was rejected based on Decree No. 34 of 11 October 1883 issued by the Nederlandsche Handel-Maatschappij (NHM), which would have invested capital in the BOS.

Considering the Cirebon Prujakan–Semarang Tawang railway as an important connection in the northern part of Java, the Staatsspoorwegen (SS) planned the construction of the Cikampek–Cirebon Prujakan connection. This decision was stipulated in the Law dated 14 June 1909 (Staatsblad No. 477), and was then put into operation on 3 June 1912. Even before its completion, funds had been allocated for the 19 km Jatibarang-Indramayu railway line; which was completed on 15 September 1912. On 1 November 1914, Semarang–Cheribon Stoomtram Maatschappij (SCS) railway line explored a partnership with SS to open a Semarang–Batavia round trip railway, in connection with the completion of the arrangement of Cirebon Prujakan.

== Double-track segment ==
The dual track section of the Cikampek–Cirebon Prujakan section is financed by a Japanese loan through the Japan Bank for International Cooperation (JBIC) and the state budget amounting to IDR 115 billion. The first segment to be built was the Haurgeulis–Cirebon Prujakan segment, which began construction in 1995 and was completed as Haurgeulis–Telagasari on 8 January 1997. According to the Minister of Transportation Haryanto Dhanutirto, the double track section of the northern and central Java line was planned to be fully operational in 1997. However, the economic crisis that hit Indonesia and the reform movement caused this program to be delayed and the result was a double track with switches on the Haurgeulis–Telagasari segment and a double track no switches on the Jatibarang–Cirebon Prujakan segment only.

Meanwhile, the second segment of this line, Cikampek–Haurgeulis, began construction with the laying of its first stone on 30 October 2001, by the then Minister of Transportation, Agum Gumelar. This double track was urgently needed considering that at that time the line could only accommodate 11 train services, but in reality its capacity reached 16 trains during peak hours.

There is a note that the plan to build a double track by the Department of Transportation was 40 months of work, but in reality it was only completed in 30 months.

On 4 December 2003, Megawati Soekarnoputri, the President of Indonesia at that time, inaugurated the Cikampek–Cirebon Prujakan double track during the 2003 Eid homecoming season. Next, in 2007, the double track on the Cikampek–Cirebon route was completely completed.

== Service ==
Here's that passing the Cikampek-Cirebon Kejaksaan-Cirebon Prujakan railway line:

=== Executive class ===
- Taksaka, between Gambir and Yogyakarta
- Argo Dwipangga, between Gambir and Solo Balapan
- Argo Lawu, between Gambir and Solo Balapan
- Argo Semeru, between Gambir and Surabaya Gubeng
- Bima, between Gambir and Surabaya Gubeng
- Manahan, between Gambir and Solo Balapan
- Gajayana, between Gambir and Malang
- Argo Bromo Anggrek, between Gambir and Surabaya Pasarturi
- Sembrani, between Gambir and Surabaya Pasarturi
- Argo Muria and Argo Sindoro, between Gambir and Semarang Tawang
- Argo Merbabu, between Gambir and Semarang Tawang
- Pandalungan, between Gambir and Jember via Surabaya Pasar Turi
- Purwojaya, between Gambir and Cilacap
- Argo Anjasmoro, between Gambir and Surabaya Pasarturi (facultative only)
- Brawijaya, between Gambir and Malang via Solo Jebres

=== Mixed class ===
- Fajar and Senja Utama Yogya, between Pasar Senen and Yogyakarta (executive class, priority class, and premium economy class)
- Fajar and Senja Utama Solo, between Pasar Senen and Solo Balapan (executive class and premium economy class)
- Bangunkarta, between Pasar Senen and Jombang (executive class and economy plus class)
- Batavia (train), between Gambir & Solo Balapan (executive and economy)
- Mataram, between Pasar Senen and Solo Balapan
- Gaya Baru Malam Selatan, Pasar Senen and Surabaya Gubeng (economy and executive)
- Singasari, between Pasar Senen and Blitar (economy and executive)
- Gumarang, between Pasar Senen and Surabaya Pasar Turi (economy and executive)
- Kertajaya, between Pasar Senen and Surabaya Pasar Turi (economy and executive) (addition only)
- Dharmawangsa Express, between Pasar Senen and Surabaya Pasar Turi (economy and executive)
- Tegal Bahari, between Pasar Senen and Tegal (economy and executive)
- Ciremai, between Bandung and Semarang Tawang (economy and executive)
- Harina, between Bandung and Surabaya Pasar Turi (premium economy and executive)
- Brantas, between Pasar Senen and Blitar via Semarang Tawang (economy and executive)
- Blambangan Express, between Pasar Senen and Ketapang (economy and executive)
- Cirebon (train), between Gambir and Cirebon (facultative) (economy and executive)
- Jayabaya train, between Pasar Senen and Malang via Semarang Tawang (economy and executive)
- Gunungjati train, between Gambir, Cirebon, and Semarang Tawang (economy and executive)
- Tawang Jaya and Menoreh, between Pasar Senen and Semarang Tawang (economy and executive)
- Jayakarta train, between Pasar Senen and Surabaya Gubeng
- Cakrabuana, between Gambir, Cirebon, and Purwokerto (economy and executive)
- Gajahwong train, between Pasar Senen and Lempuyangan (economy and executive)
- Sawunggalih, between Pasar Senen and Kutoarjo (economy and executive)
- Madiun Jaya, Pasar Senen and Madiun (economy and executive)

=== Economy ===
- Jayakarta, between Pasar Senen and Surabaya Gubeng (premium economy)
- Progo, between Pasar Senen and Lempuyangan
- Bengawan, between Pasar Senen and Purwosari
- Jaka Tingkir, between Pasar Senen and Solo Balapan
- Kertajaya, between Pasar Senen and Surabaya Pasar Turi (premium economy) (regular)
- Majapahit train, between Pasar Senen and Malang via Semarang Tawang
- Matarmaja train, between Pasar Senen and Malang via Semarang Poncol
- Airlangga, between Pasar Senen and Surabaya Pasar Turi
- Kutojaya Utara, between Pasar Senen and Kutoarjo

=== Freight ===
- Overnight train service, between Kampung Bandan and Surabaya Pasar Turi (Northern Parcel), between Kampung Bandan and Malang (Central Parcel)
- Container Freight, between Tanjung Priok, Klari, Kampung Bandan, Semarang Tawang, Benteng station, and Kalimas
- Indocement Cement Freight, between Nambo, Arjawinangun, Brambanan, and Kalimas station
- Container and Steel Coil Freight, between Krenceng and Kalimas station

== See also ==
- Rajawali–Cikampek railway
- Cikampek–Padalarang railway
