= Cirebon Prujakan railway station =

Railway station in Indonesia

Cirebon Prujakan Station Stasiun Cirebon Prujakan
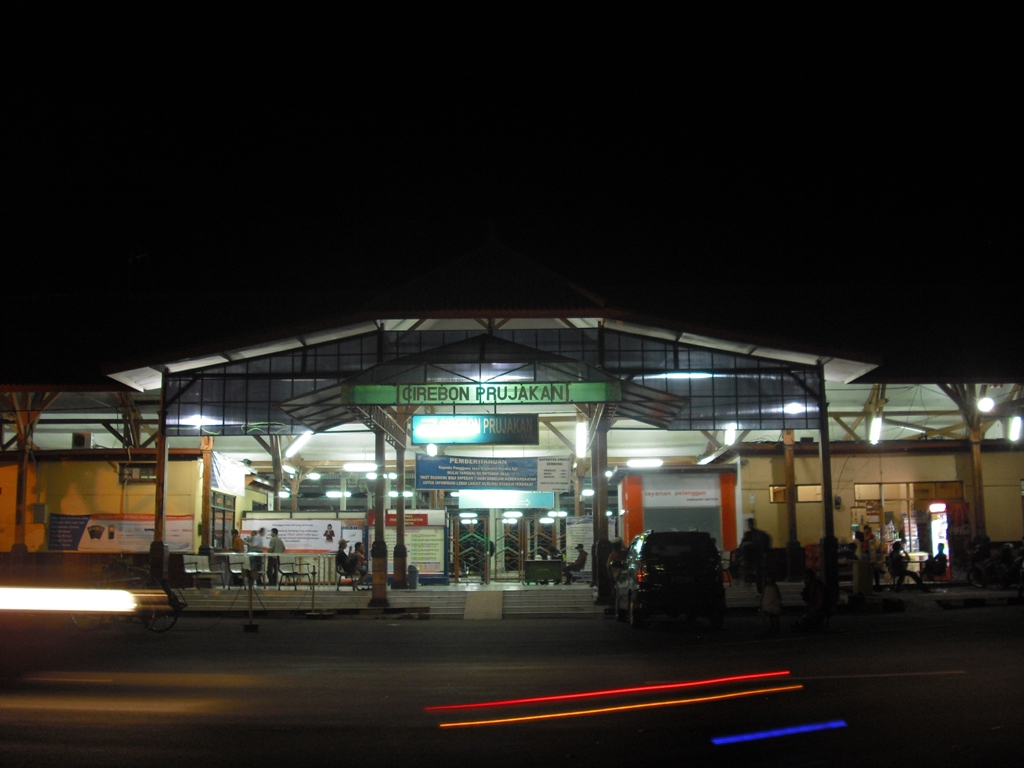
- Main entrance of Cirebon Prujakan Station

General information
- Other names: Prujakan Station
- Location: Jl. Nyimas Gandasari, Pekalangan, Pekalipan, Cirebon; West Java; Indonesia
- Coordinates: 6°43′10″S 108°33′31″E
- Elevation: +4 m (13 ft)
- Owner: Kereta Api Indonesia
- Operator: Kereta Api Indonesia
- Lines: Cikampek–Cirebon Prujakan; Cirebon Prujakan–Prupuk–Tegal; Cirebon Prujakan–Prupuk–Purwokerto
- Platforms: 1 side platform 4 island platforms
- Tracks: 9

Construction
- Structure type: Ground
- Parking: Available
- Accessible: Available

Other information
- Station code: CNP • 0940
- Classification: Large class type A

History
- Opened: 1 May 1897
- Former names: Cheribon Station (SCS); Tjirebon Proedjakan Station
- Original company: Semarang–Cheribon Stoomtram Maatschappij
Location
- Location within Java

Cirebon Prujakan Station (CNP) is a railway station in Cirebon, West Java, Indonesia. The station is located at a height of 4 metres above sea level. It is located at Nyimas Gandasari Street, Pekalangan, Pekalipan, Cirebon. Cirebon Prujakan Station is the largest station on DAOP 3 Cirebon after Cirebon Station and Jatibarang Station.

Cirebon Prujakan Station is a train station for economy class trains. Executive and business class trains do not stop at this station but stop at Cirebon Station — although sometimes there is also a stop on Cirebon Prujakan to cross — because the line was still using a single eastward track. This station is the only railway station in DAOP 3 Cirebon that has a drive-through ticketing system, which it has had since 2011.

In 2011, Cirebon Prujakan Station and Cirebon station was renovated by elevating the platform and adding lines.

== History ==
In a report made by a private railway company named Semarang–Cheribon Stoomtram Maatschappij (SCS), this station was built and inaugurated almost simultaneously with the Sindanglaut–Cirebon railway line, namely on 1 May 1897 at the initiative of SCS as a freight train station. As a container station and freight trains, the construction of this station aims to facilitate and accelerate the flow of agricultural commodities and imported goods. The flow of goods from this station then ends at Cirebon Port because this station used to be a branch station to that port. However, the generation born in the 1980s no longer saw the railroad tracks leading to the Cirebon Harbor that stretched in the middle of a densely populated village, although some of the remnants can still be seen.

On 3 June 1912, the Cikampek to Cirebon railroad was completed by Staatsspoorwegen and was part of the construction of the railway to Purwokerto and Kroya. On 1 November 1914, in order to connect the SS line and SCS line, the two stations were connected.

Since July 2011, the station Cirebon Prujakan has been a large station intended to function as the economy class train stops in the city of Cirebon on the north and south line, branching the two.

== Building and layout ==
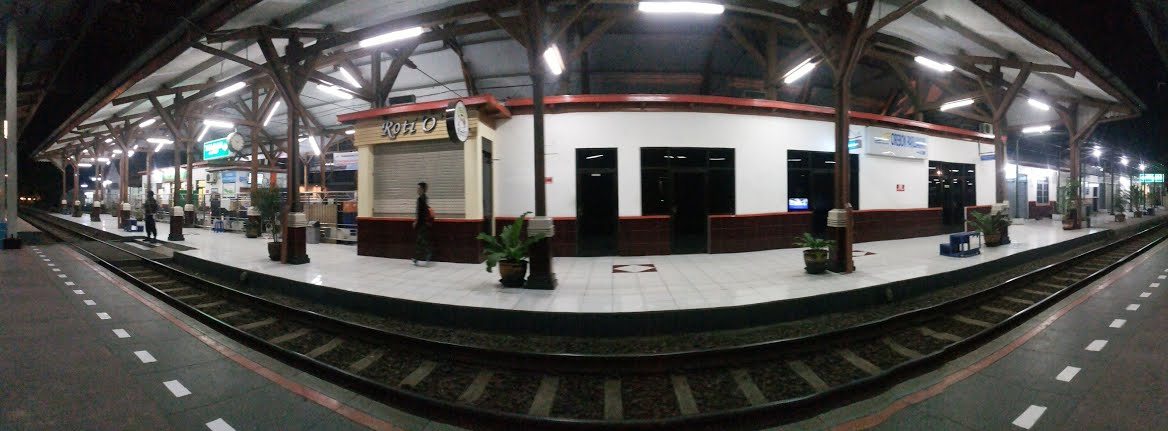
Panoramic view of the Cirebon Prujakan station platform

Cirebon Prujakan Station initially only consisted of a building with a canopy on the overhang of the line 1 platform (like a freight station) and had four train lines with line 3 being a straight line towards Jakarta and Semarang. This station emplacement is an open emplacement with no roof overcapping.

In July 2011 the station was renovated, the platform was raised, a canopy was added, and the tracks were added to a total of nine train lines: four lines to Tegal-Pekalongan-Semarang-Surabaya (lines 1-4) with line 3 being a straight line, four more lines to Purwokerto-Kroya-Yogyakarta-Solo (lines 6-9) with line 7 being a straight line, as well as a special line for freight trains (line 5). Simultaneously with the transfer of the branch line from Cirebon Station to Prujakan Station, the rail line between the two stations was made into a double track. The electrical signaling produced by the General Railway Signal (GRS), which has been installed since 2003, has been reworked.

Later, since the Prujakan–Waruduwur double track section was officially operated from 4 July 2013, line 3 is only used as a straight gauge for the Semarang direction, while line 2 is only used as a straight gauge only for the Cikampek direction. Eventually, since the Prujakan–Luwung double-plot track was officially operated starting 1 April 2015, line 7 has been used as a straight track for the Cikampek direction only, while line 8 has been used as a straight track only for the Prupuk direction.

This station is one of the train stations in Indonesia that provides a drive-through ticketing system, in addition to Gambir Station.

== Services ==
The following is a list of train services at the Cirebon Prujakan Station

- Bangunkarta to Pasar Senen and Jombang
- Majapahit to Pasar Senen and Malang
- Matarmaja to Pasar Senen and Malang
- Brantas to Pasar Senen and Blitar
- Gaya Baru Malam Selatan to Pasar Senen and Surabaya Gubeng
- Kertajaya to Pasar Senen and Surabaya Pasar Turi
- Dharmawangsa to Pasar Senen and Surabaya Pasar Turi
- Bogowonto to Pasar Senen and Lempuyangan
- Gajahwong to Pasar Senen and Lempuyangan
- Jaka Tingkir to Pasar Senen and Purwosari
- Progo to Pasar Senen and Lempuyangan
- Bengawan to Pasar Senen and Purwosari
- Kutojaya Utara to Pasar Senen and Kutoarjo
- Menoreh to Pasar Senen and Semarang Tawang
- Tawang Jaya to Pasar Senen and Semarang Poncol
- Tegal Bahari to Pasar Senen and Tegal
- Kaligung to Semarang Poncol
- Airlangga to Surabaya Pasarturi and Pasar Senen

== Gallery ==
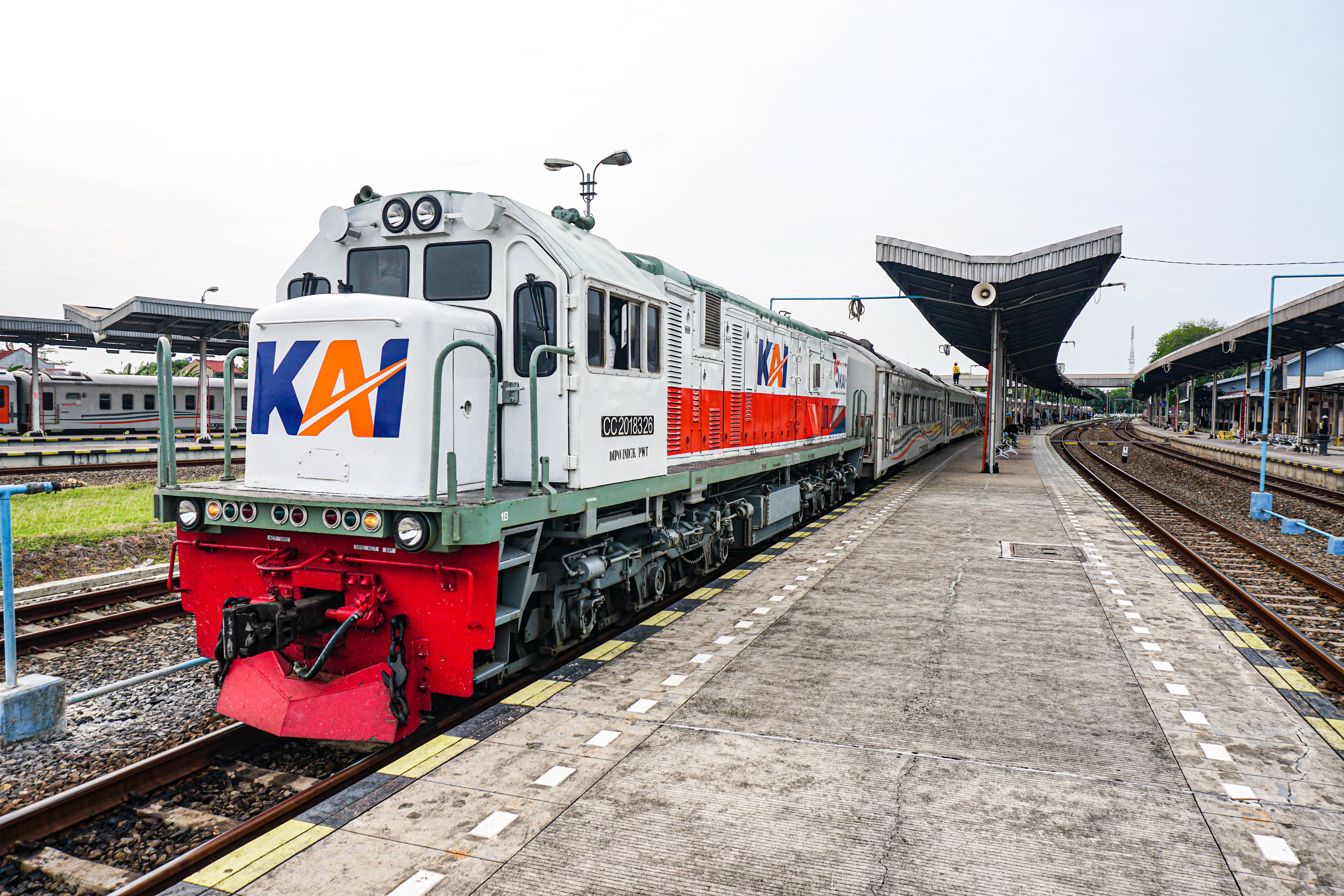
The Brantas train at the station platform

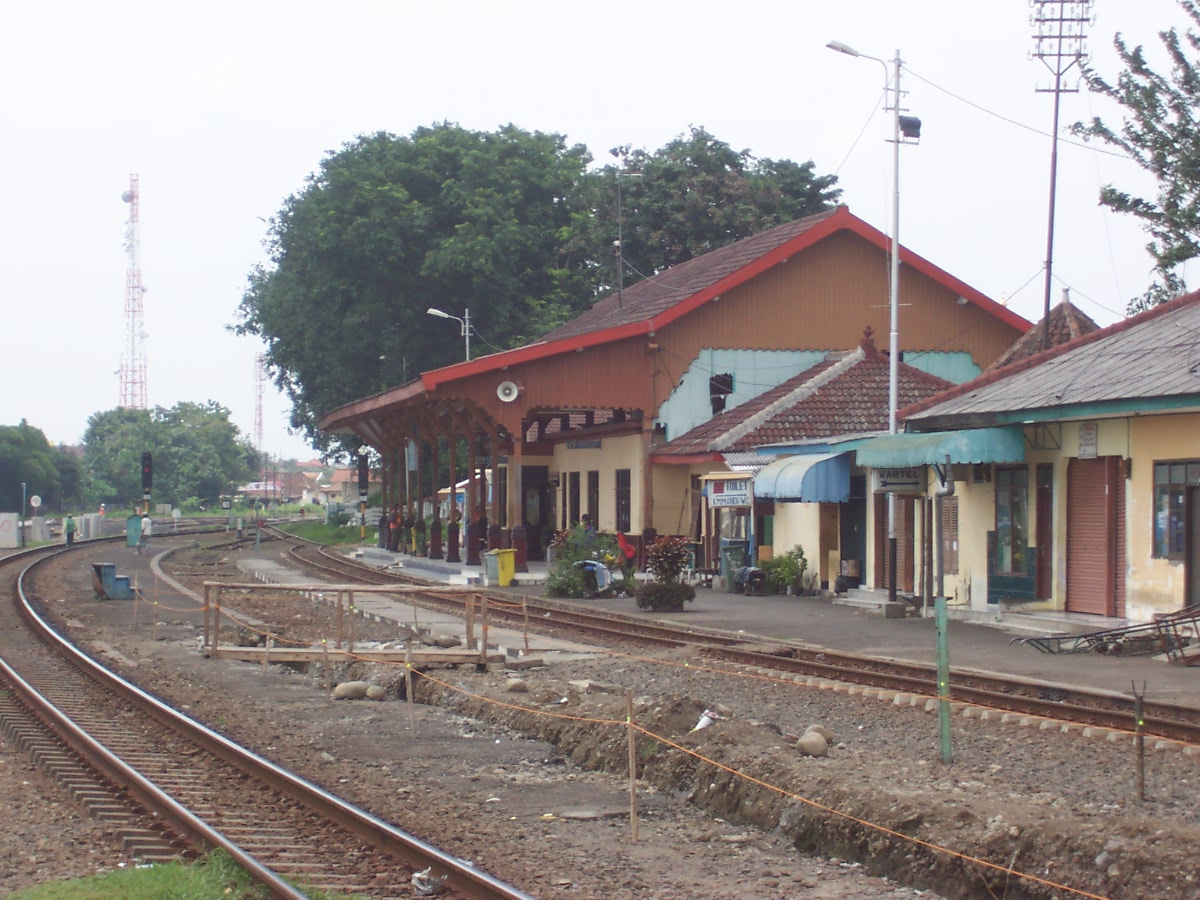
The emplacement of the station prior to renovation

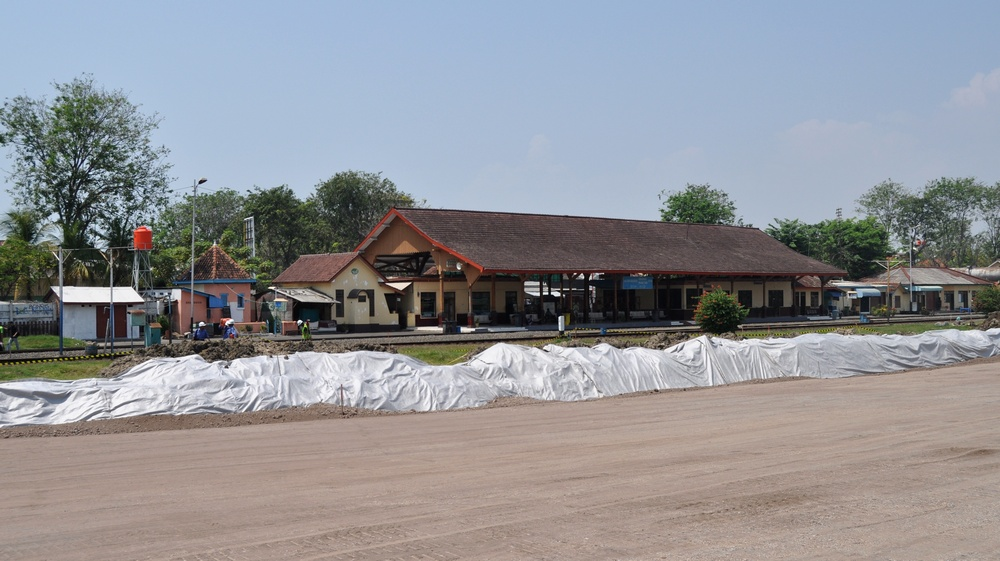
The emplacement of the station during the early stage of renovation (2010)

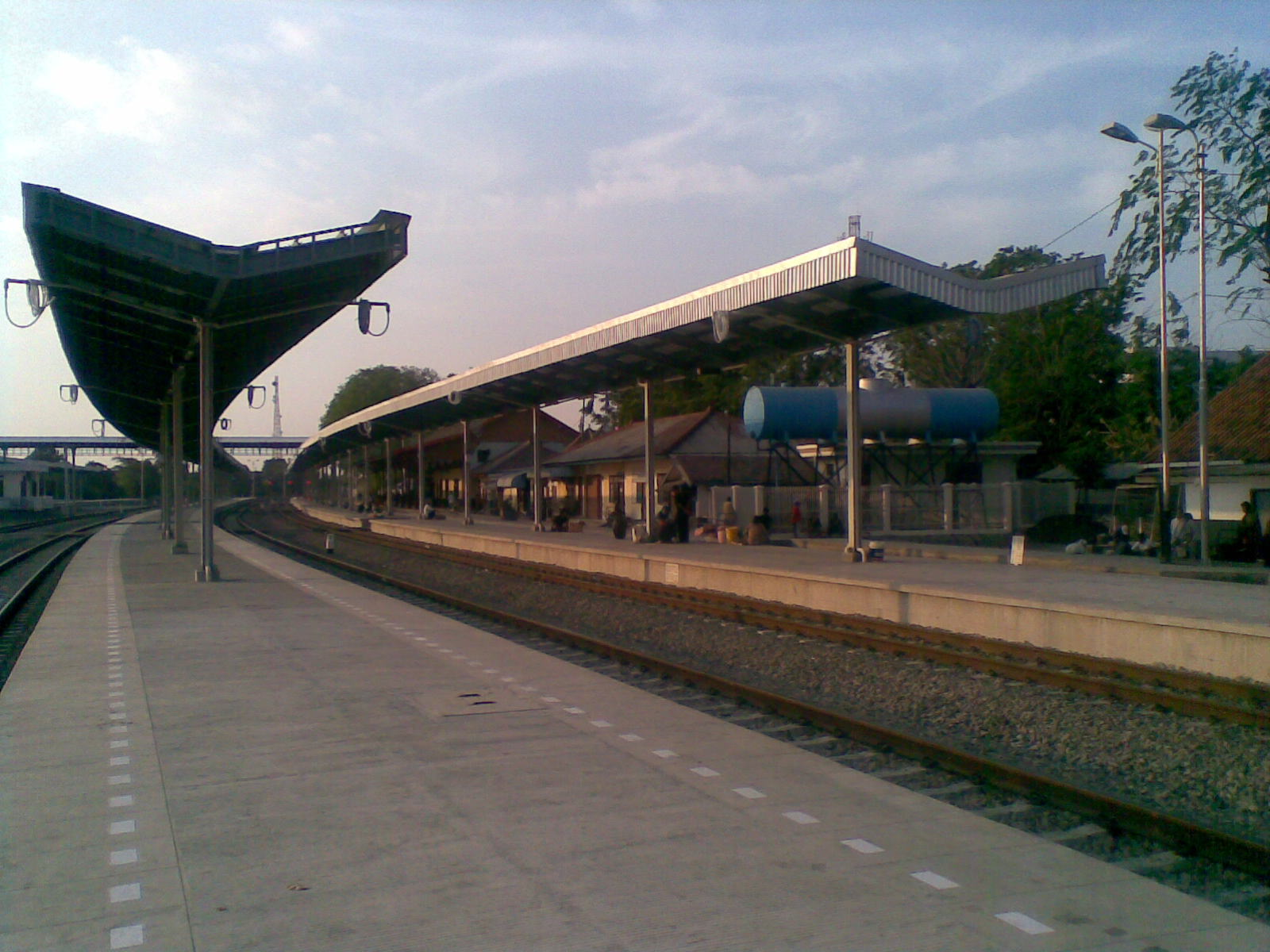
The renovated platform of the station

Preceding station	Kereta Api Indonesia	Following station
Cirebon towards Cikampek	Cikampek–Cirebon Prujakan	Terminus
Terminus	Cirebon Prujakan–Prupuk–Tegal; CNP–TG	Waruduwur towards Tegal
Terminus	Cirebon Prujakan–Prupuk–Tegal; CNP–PPK	Luwung towards Prupuk
