= Kaligung =

Indonesian passenger train service

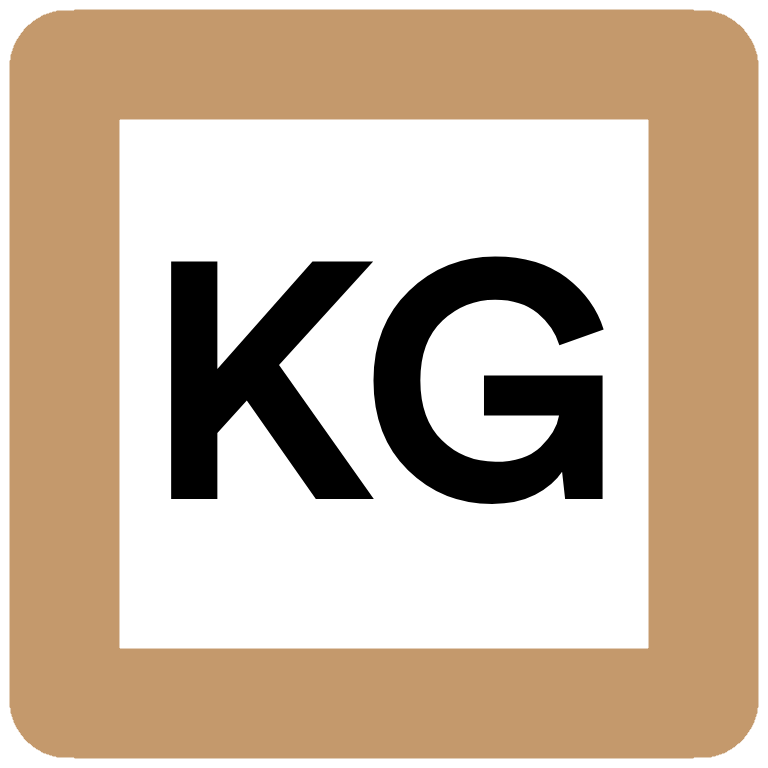
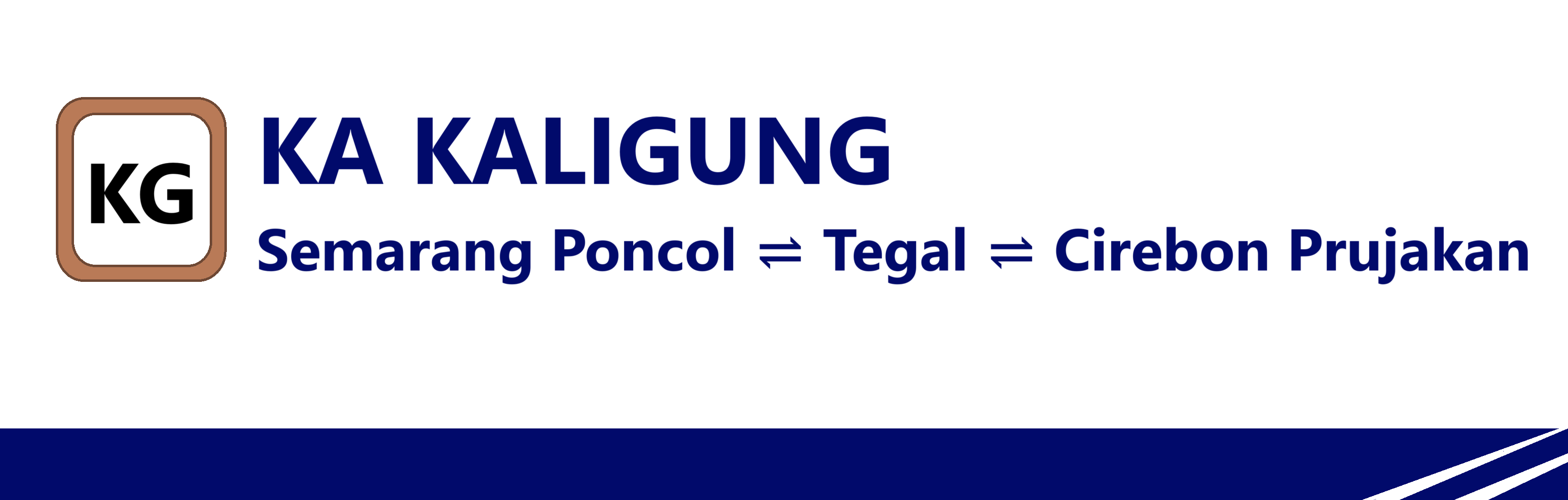

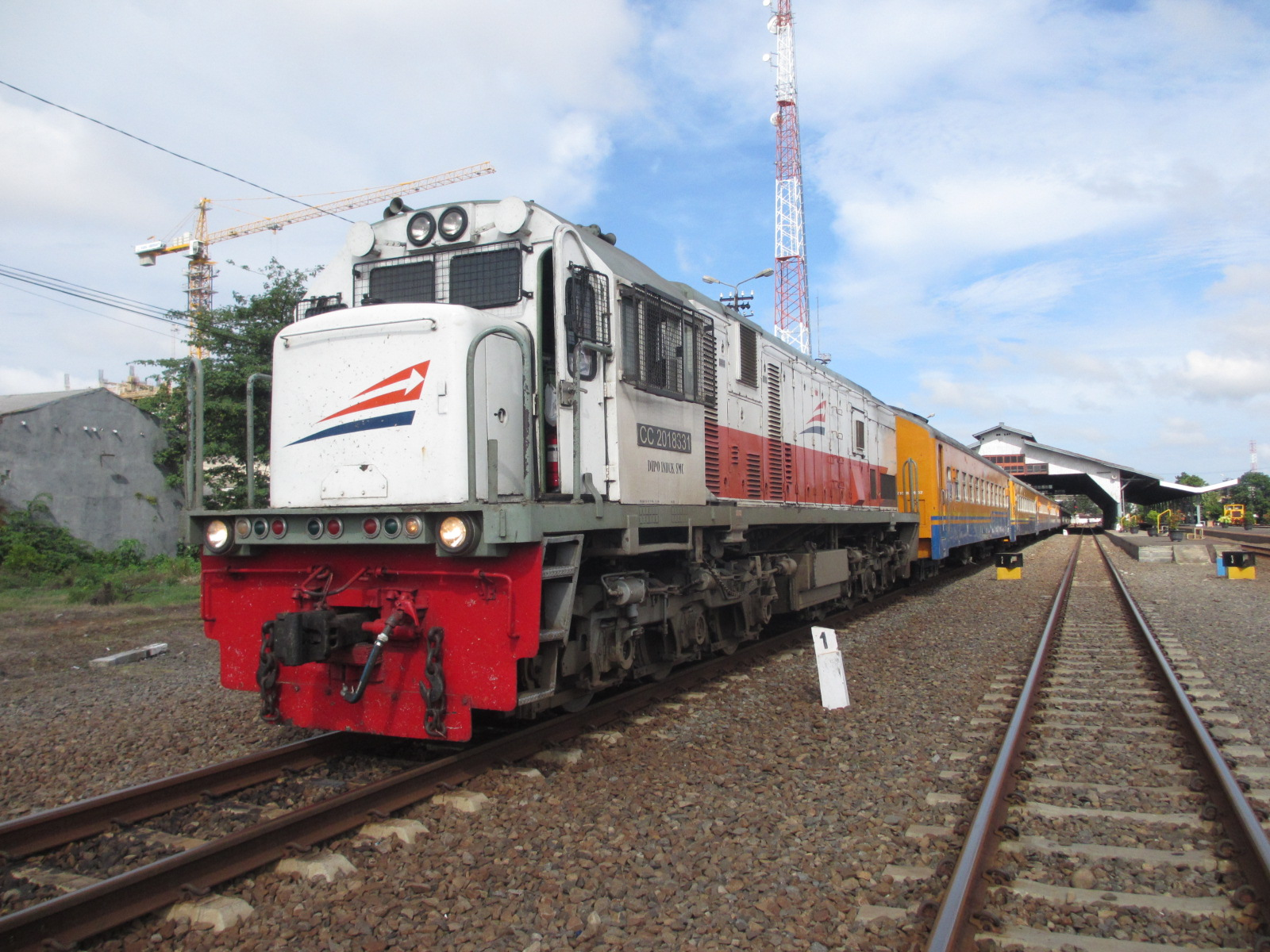
- Kaligung train in Pekalongan, 2014

Overview
- Service type: Agglomeration rail
- Status: Operational
- Locale: Operational Area IV Semarang
- First service: 4 February 1999
- Current operator: Kereta Api Indonesia

Route
- Termini: Semarang Poncol: Tegal; Brebes; Cirebon Prujakan
- Distance travelled: 222 kilometres (138 miles)
- Average journey time: Semarang Poncol–Tegal: 2 hours 11-35 minutes; Semarang Poncol–Brebes: 2 hours 28-36 minutes; Semarang Poncol–Cirebon Prujakan: 3 hours 50 minutes
- Service frequency: 5x daily each way
- Train numbers: SMC - BB : 213, 214, 216; SMC - CN : 217, 218; SMC - TG : 215, 219, 220, 221F, 222F

On-board services
- Classes: executive and economy
- Seating arrangements: 50 seats arranged 2-2 (executive class); 80/64 seats arranged 2-2 (economy class); 40/32 seats arranged 2-2 (economy class)
- Catering facilities: On-board cafe and trolley service

Technical
- Rolling stock: CC206/CC203/CC201
- Track gauge: 1,067 mm
- Operating speed: 80–100 kilometres per hour (50–62 mph)
Route map
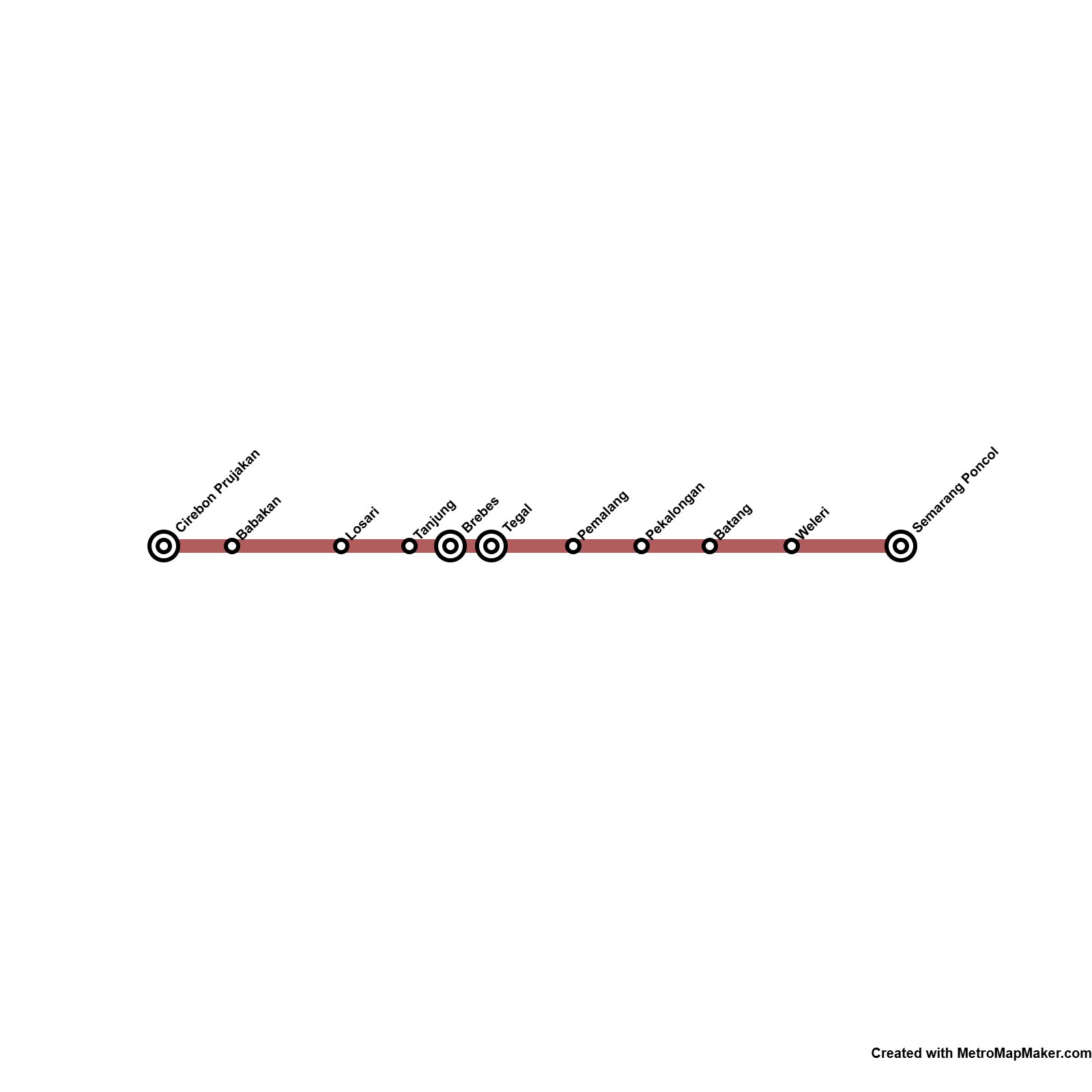

Kaligung is an Indonesian regional passenger train service operated by Kereta Api Indonesia (KAI). It is managed by Operational Area IV Semarang and serves the corridor from Semarang Poncol to Tegal, Brebes and Cirebon Prujakan with multiple daily trips using New Image economy coaches and, more recently, additional executive class accommodation.

== History ==
Kaligung service began operating on 4 February 1999 as a local commercial train linking Semarang and Tegal, offering business and economy class accommodation managed by KAI's Operational Area IV Semarang (Daop IV Semarang). The name Kaligung is derived from the Kali Gung river (also known as Kali Ketiwon) which flows through Tegal Regency and Tegal, reflecting the train's role as a key service for communities along the north coast of Central Java.

In its early years the service used MCW type diesel multiple units (KRD MCW), and by 2008 new Kaligung sets of the Indonesian diesel multiple unit type (KRDI) were introduced on the Semarang–Tegal route under the name Kaligung Baru to provide air conditioned economy accommodation for around 400 passengers. Over time the original diesel multiple units were gradually replaced by locomotive hauled economy coaches, while some of the former diesel multiple unit Kaligung sets were reassigned to Solo Balapan to support the operation of the Prambanan Ekspres services.

On 1 December 2010 KAI introduced Kaligung Mas as a premium service that complemented the existing Kaligung trains on the Semarang–Tegal route. It used a refurbished set from the Cirebon Express with business and executive class accommodation and was scheduled from Tegal with intermediate stops at Pemalang, Pekalongan, Semarang Poncol and Semarang Tawang. In 2012 KAI further modernised this route by introducing the air conditioned diesel-electric multiple unit (KRDE) to replace the locomotive hauled Kaligung Mas and Tegal Express, operating four trips per day between Semarang Tawang and Tegal with a capacity of about 462 passengers. At the same time Daop 4 Semarang increased the number of Kaligung journeys and merged Kaligung and Kaligung Mas services so that they operated as a unified corridor between Semarang and Tegal.

On 12 January 2016 KAI unveiled a special Kaligung Borobudur formation, modifying six economy class coaches and a dining car with teak wood interiors and Borobudur themed reliefs in order to promote Central Java tourism. The refurbished train, which retained its existing fares, provided 636 seats and ran four times daily between Semarang and Tegal. From 7 February 2017 this Borobudur themed set was replaced by 2016 built New Image economy coaches produced by Industri Kereta Api in Madiun, while ticket prices were kept at their previous levels. The upgraded formations offered facilities that KAI promoted as equivalent to executive class, including improved interiors, air conditioning and onboard amenities, although the service remained classified as economy class.

On 1 April 2017, Kaligung route, which had previously run between Tegal and Semarang Poncol, was extended westwards to start from Brebes. The inaugural departure of the extended service was marked by a ceremony at Brebes station attended by local government representatives and KAI's regional management. The extended Kaligung operated twice daily from Brebes with a journey time of about two hours twenty five minutes between Brebes and Semarang Poncol and a capacity of 560 seats per trainset, which included air conditioning, closed circuit television and television screens in each coach. To respond to growing demand between Brebes, Tegal and Semarang, KAI Daop 4 Semarang increased the frequency of Kaligung from eight to ten trips per day in 2018, adding two night time services.

From 15 March 2019 Kaligung and Menoreh trains began stopping at Batang station, which had previously not handled regular passenger services. Initially the stop was treated as an extraordinary stop pending incorporation into the 2019 train travel chart, allowing passengers from Batang to travel by rail towards Semarang, Tegal, Brebes and Jakarta. With the introduction of the 2019 train travel chart, Kaligung route was extended again westwards from Brebes to Cirebon Prujakan, and the train was formally classified as an agglomeration service under Daop 4 Semarang. It uses New Image economy coaches with facilities comparable to executive class, and fares are generally set between Rp 40,000 and Rp 70,000, with a special Rp 20,000 fare on the Cirebon–Tegal sector under certain conditions. Over this period, Kaligung also received an additional executive class coach type, so that the service operates with both economy and executive accommodation, and has become one of the main commuter and regional services for students and workers travelling between Semarang and the western north coast districts of Pemalang, Tegal and Brebes.

== Station ==
Kaligung operates multiple daily trips on routes from Semarang Poncol to Tegal, Brebes and Cirebon Prujakan, with intermediate stops that vary slightly by train. The principal stations served include:

- Semarang Poncol (start/end)
- Weleri
- Batang
- Pekalongan
- Pemalang
- Tegal (start/end on some services)
- Brebes (start/end on some services)
- Tanjung
- Losari
- Babakan
- Cirebon Prujakan (start/end)
