= Jatibarang railway station =

Railway station in Indonesia

Jatibarang Station Stasiun Jatibarang
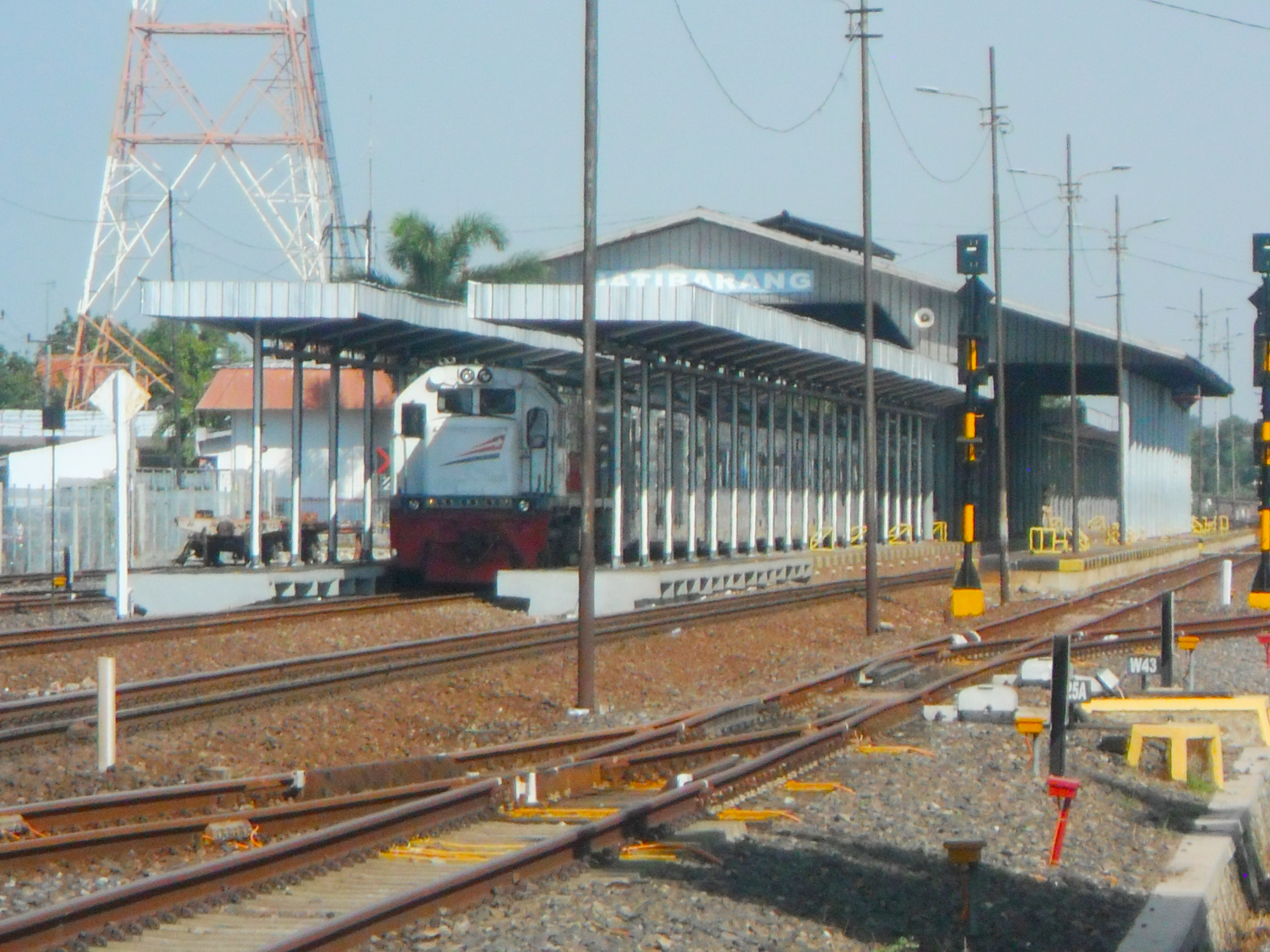
- Jatibarang train station from the south, December 2019

General information
- Location: Jl. Mayor Sangun, Jatibarang, Indramayu Regency; West Java; Indonesia
- Coordinates: 6°28′22″S 108°18′23″E
- Elevation: +8 m (26 ft)
- Owner: Kereta Api Indonesia
- Operator: Kereta Api Indonesia
- Line: Cikampek–Cirebon Prujakan
- Platforms: 1 side platform 4 island platforms
- Tracks: 5

Construction
- Structure type: Ground
- Parking: Available
- Cycle facilities: Bicycle parking
- Accessible: Available

Other information
- Station code: JTB • 0919
- Classification: Large class type C

History
- Opened: 3 June 1912; 114 years ago
Location
- Location within Java

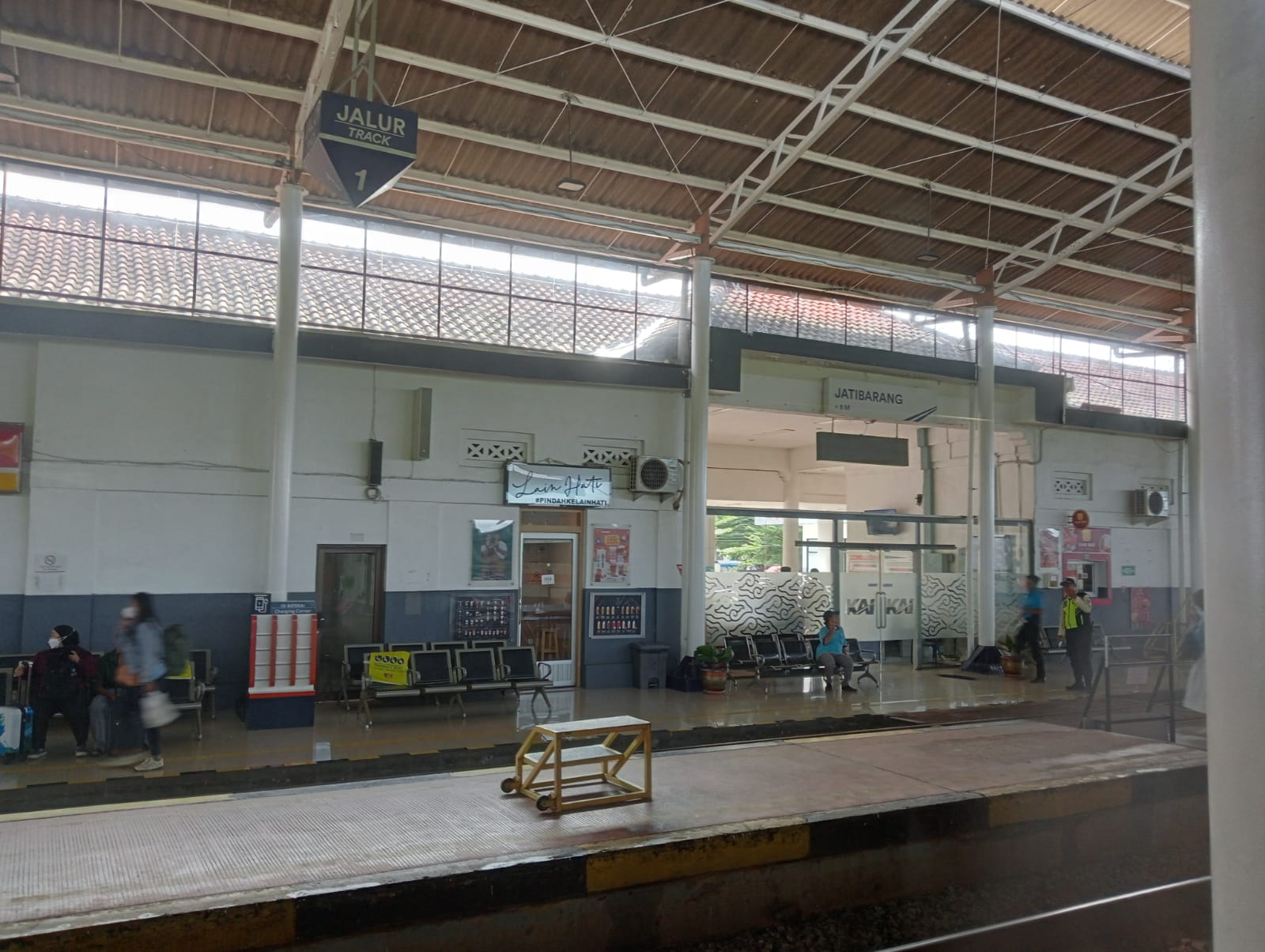
Jatibarang Train Station in West Java, Indonesia.

Jatibarang Station is a railway station at Mayor Sangun Street (Market), Jatibarang, Jatibarang, Indramayu Regency, West Java. It is on the main northern Java route line from Jakarta to Surabaya.

== History ==
Jatibarang Station is a train station that was built simultaneously with the Cikampek railway to Cirebon until it was completed on 3 June 1912, aiming to connect the Staatsspoorwegen (SS) line with the Semarang–Cheribon Stoomtram Maatschappij (SCS) line.

This station has branches to Indramayu and Karangampel, but these branch lines have been deactivated.

== Building and layout ==
Jatibarang Station has five railway lines. Initially, line 2 was a straight line, but since the construction of the Telagasari–Cirebon double-track line in 2004–2007, the existing line 2 is only used as a straight line towards Cirebon, while line 3 is used as a straight line towards Cikampek. The station building which is a legacy of the Staatsspoorwegen is maintained. In the past, there was a rail siding leading to the Sriwidjaja Fertilizer Warehouse.

The station building has undergone many changes and renovations, including the extension of the station canopy and the construction of new buildings. The new building which is used to support service standards was inaugurated on 7 February 2020 by the Main Director of KAI, Edi Sukmoro, together with the Regent of Indramayu.

== Services ==
=== Passenger services ===
==== Executive class ====
- Argo Cheribon, destination of Gambir and Cirebon
- Bima, destination of Gambir and Surabaya Gubeng

==== Mixed class ====
- Argo Cheribon, destination Gambir and Cirebon-Tegal (executive-economy)
- Brantas, destination of Blitar via Semarang Tawang-Solo Jebres-Madiun
- Ciremai, destination of Cikampek (executive-business)
- Fajar Utama Solo, destination of Solo Balapan (executive-economy)
- Fajar Utama Yogya, destination of Pasar Senen and Yogyakarta (executive-economy)
- Gaya Baru Malam Selatan, destination of Pasar Senen and Surabaya Gubeng via Purwokerto-Yogyakarta (executive-economy)
- Gumarang, destination of Pasar Senen and Surabaya Pasar Turi (executive-business)
- Jayabaya, destination of Pasar Senen and Malang via Semarang Poncol-Surabaya Pasar Turi (executive-economy)
- Kertajaya, destination of Pasar Senen (business-economy)
- Mataram, destination of Pasar Senen and Solo Balapan (executive-business)
- Sawunggalih (morning schedule), destination of Kutoarjo (executive-economy)
- Senja Utama Solo, destination of Pasar Senen (executive-economy)
- Singasari, destination of Pasar Senen and Blitar via Purwokerto-Lempuyangan-Purwosari-Madiun (executive-economy)

==== Economy class ====
- Jaka Tingkir, destination of Pasar Senen and Purwosari
- Jayabaya, destination of Jakarta Kota and Surabaya Gubeng via Cirebon-Purwokerto-Yogyakarta-Solo Balapan-Madiun
- Kertajaya, destination of Pasar Senen and Surabaya Pasar Turi via Semarang Poncol-Bojonegoro
- Kutojaya Utara, destination of Jakarta Kota and Kutoarjo via Cirebon Prujakan-Purwokerto
- Matarmaja, destination of Pasar Senen and Malang via Semarang Tawang-Madiun
- Menoreh, destination of Jakarta Kota and Semarang Tawang
- Sawunggalih, destination of Kutoarjo via Cirebon-Purwokerto
- Tawang Jaya, destination of Pasar Senen
- Tawang Jaya, destination of Semarang Poncol
- Tegal Bahari, destination of Pasar Senen and Tegal

== Incidents ==
- On 9 March 2010, The Tegal Arum train for the Jakarta-Tegal route suffered a broken axle causing it to derail at Kongsijaya, Widasari, Indramayu at 18.30.

== Gallery ==
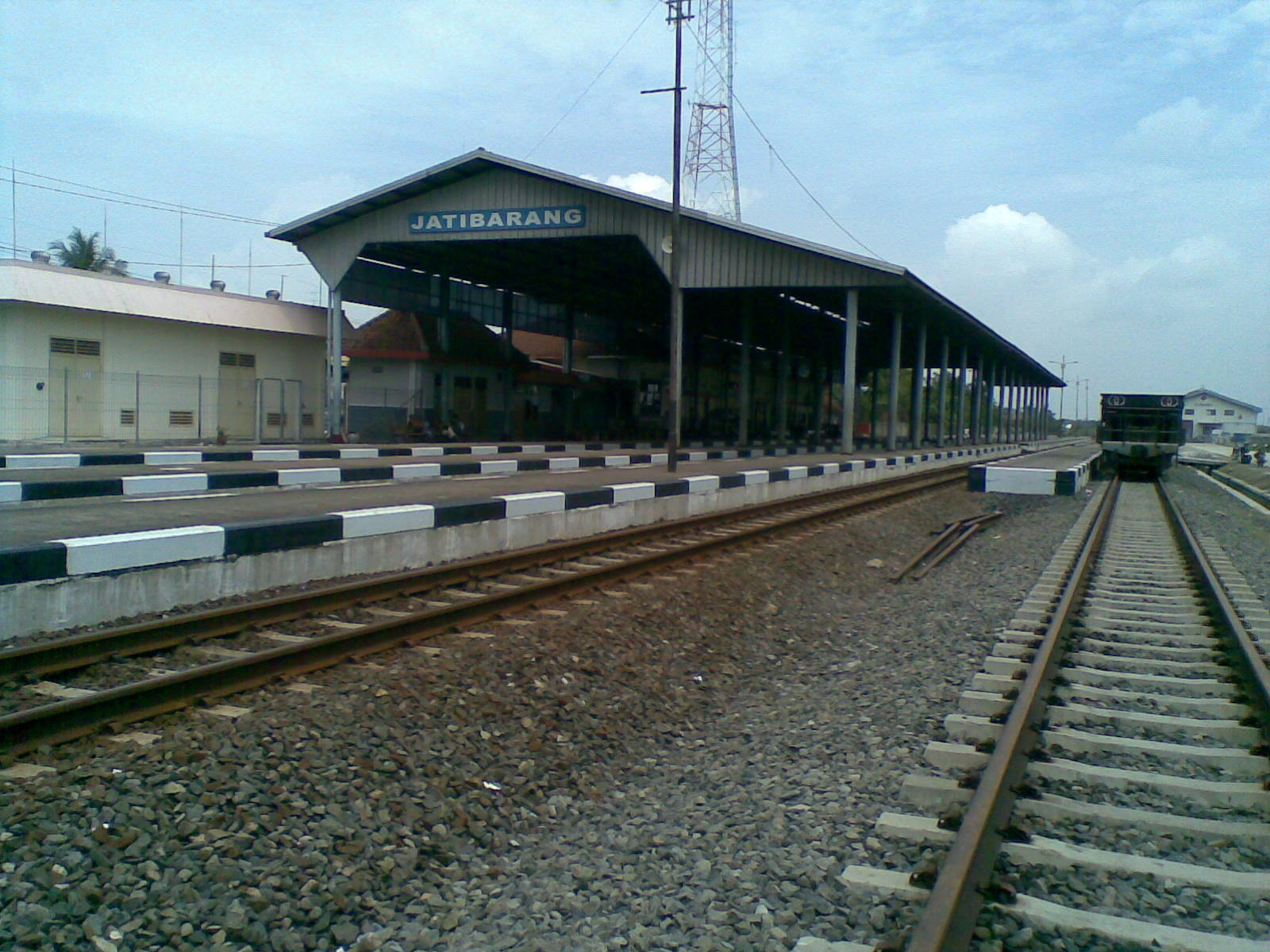
The platform of the station seen from the south

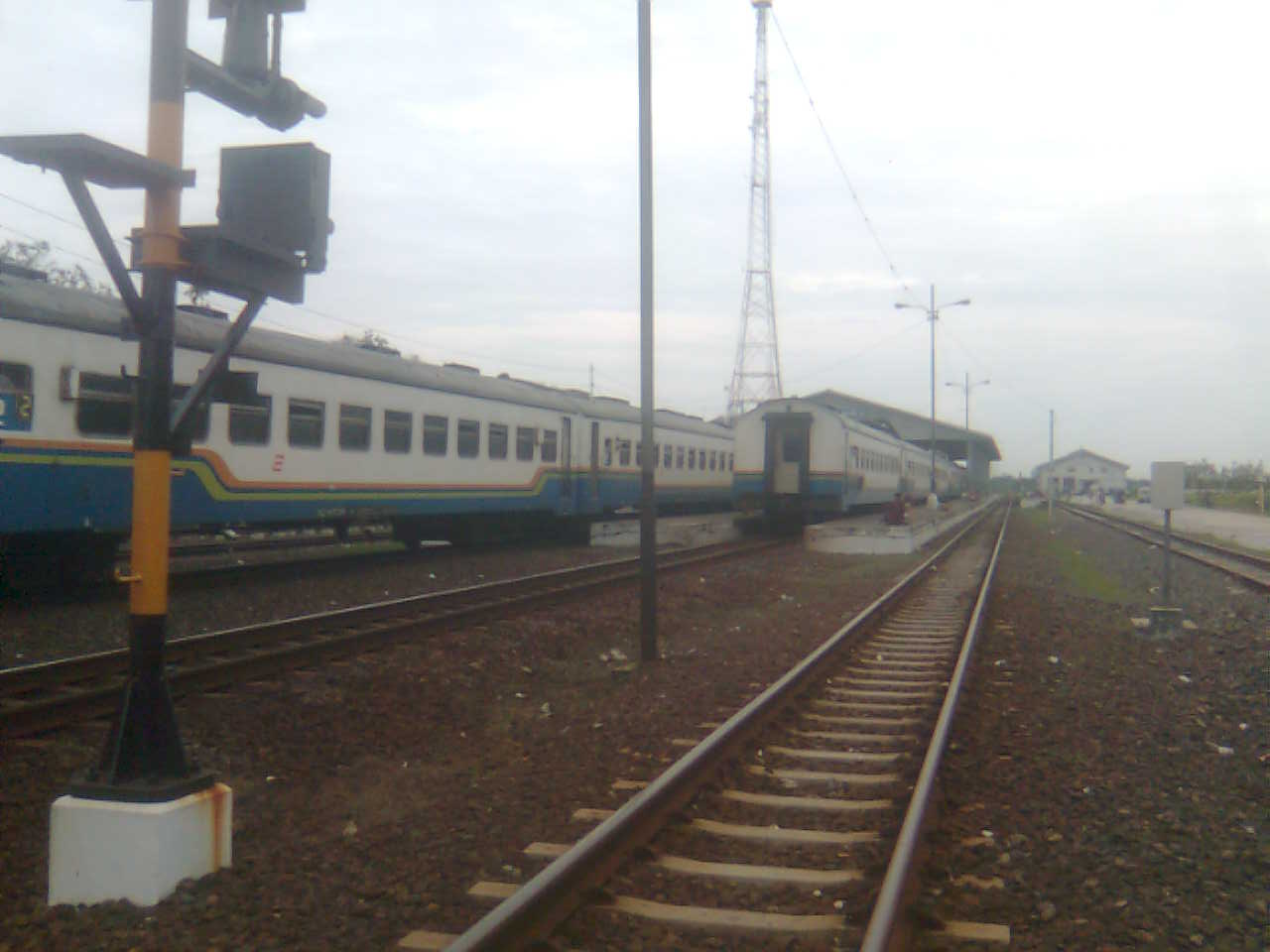
Cirebon Express trains that pass each other at Jatibarang Station

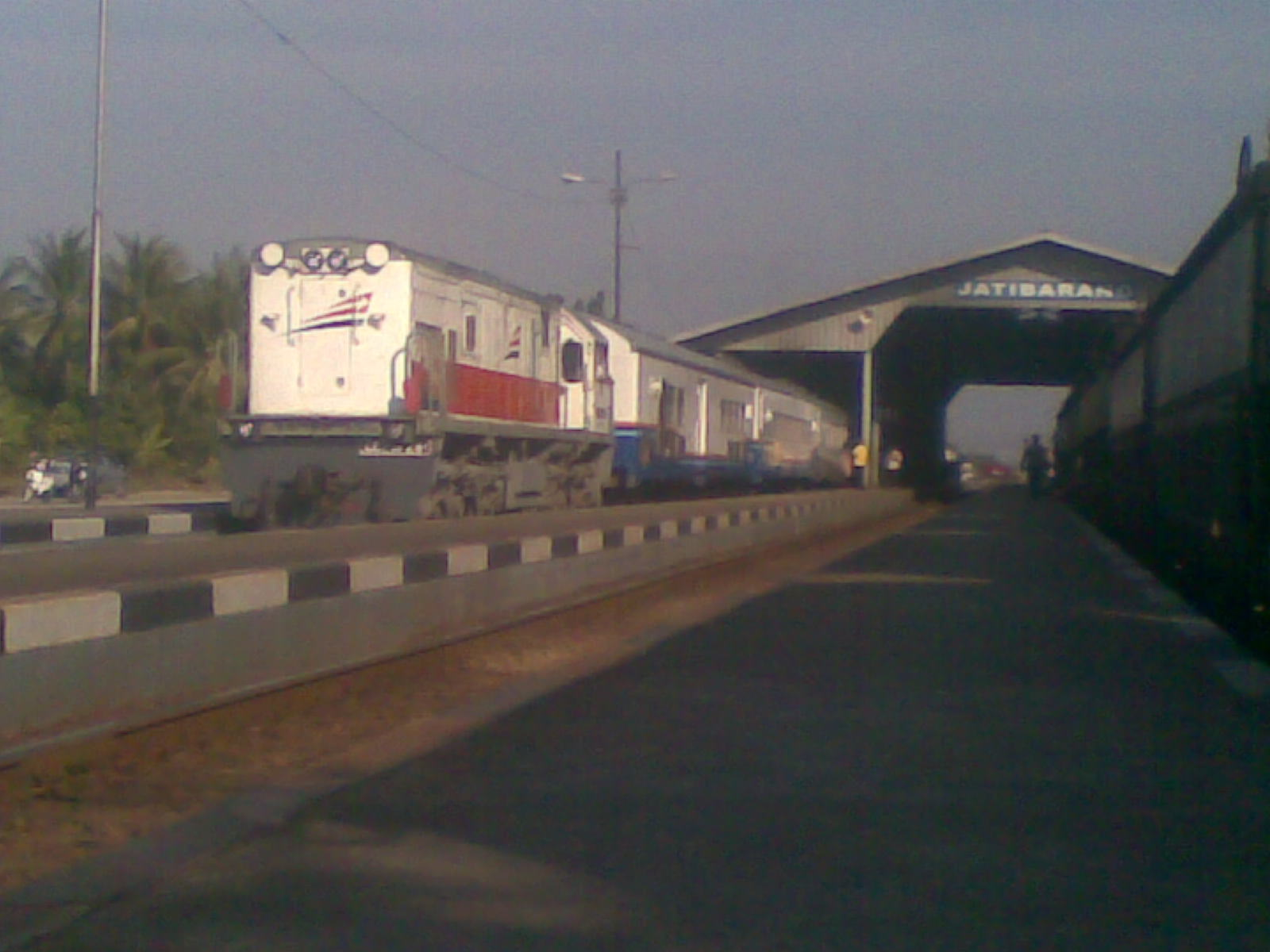
Cirebon Express train at Jatibarang Station

Preceding station	Kereta Api Indonesia	Following station
Telagasari towards Cikampek	Cikampek–Cirebon Prujakan	Kertasemaya towards Cirebon Prujakan
