= Ambarawa Express =

Passenger train service between Semarang Poncol and Surabaya, Indonesia

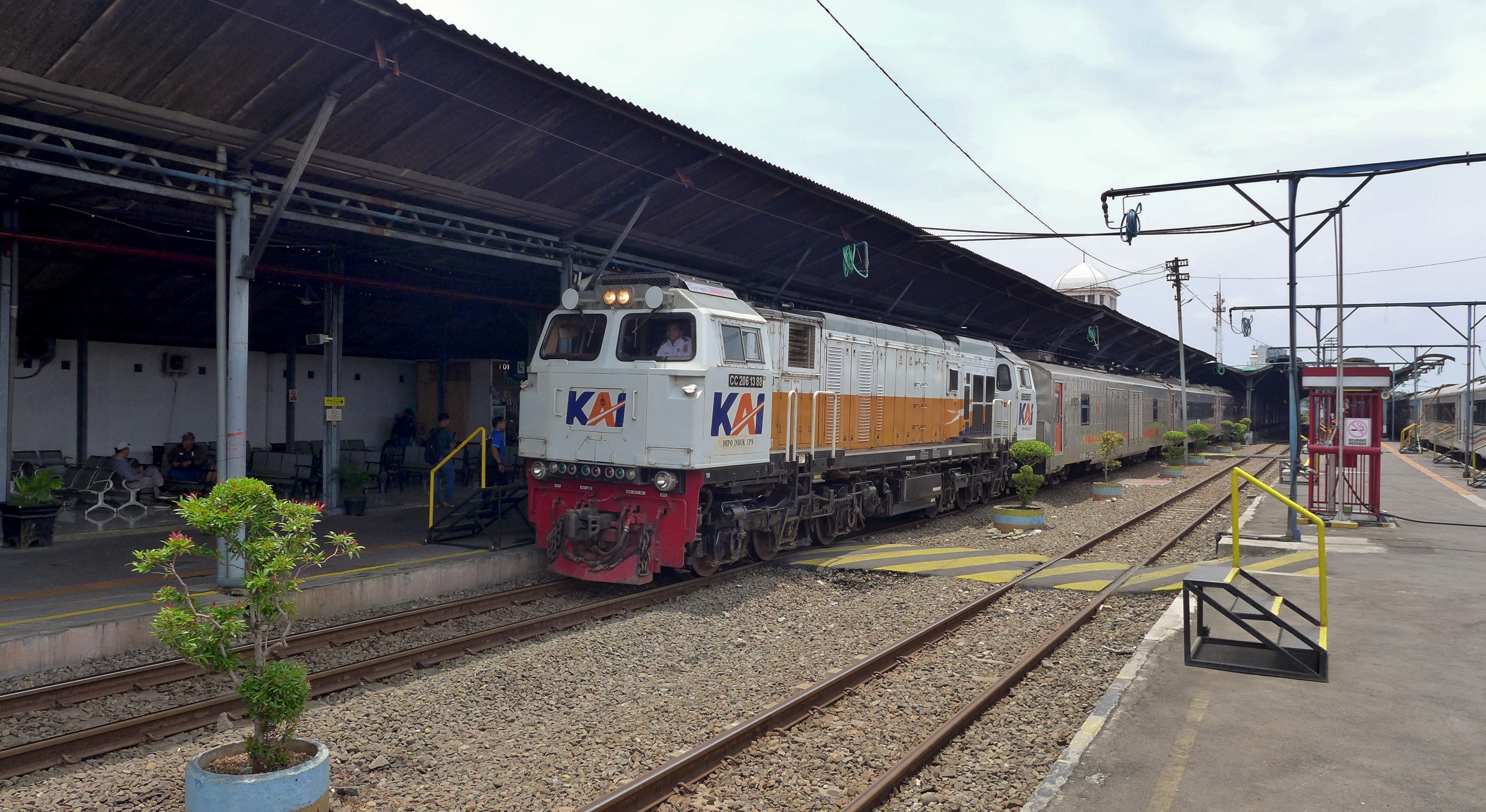
- Ambarawa Express in Semarang Tawang station, 2025

Overview
- Service type: Inter-city rail
- Status: Operational
- Predecessor: Maharani; Blora Jaya Express
- First service: 4 October 2016 (Ambarawa 1); 1 April 2022 (Ambarawa 2)
- Current operator: Kereta Api Indonesia

Route
- Termini: Semarang Poncol; Surabaya Pasarturi
- Distance travelled: 257 km (159 mil)
- Average journey time: 4 hours 25 minutes (Ambarawa 1); 4 hours 22 minutes (Ambarawa 2)
- Service frequency: 2x Daily each way
- Train number: 263-266

On-board services
- Class: economy
- Seating arrangements: 80 seats arranged 2-2 (economy class)
- Catering facilities: On-board cafe and trolley service

Technical
- Rolling stock: CC206; CC203; CC204; CC201
- Track gauge: 1067 mm
- Operating speed: 80 km/h (50 mph) to 100 km/h (62 mph)
Route map
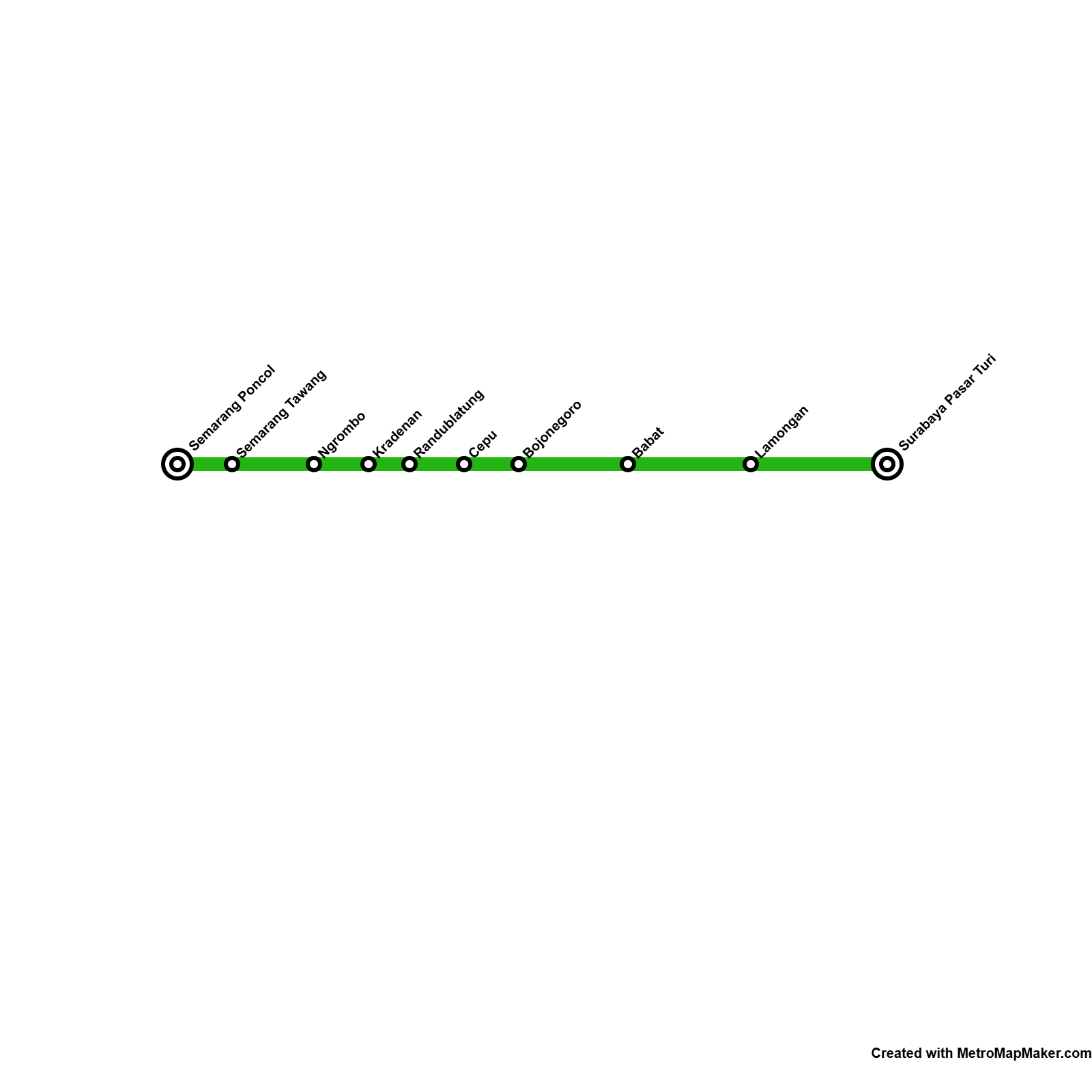

Ambarawa Express is an Indonesian passenger train operated by Kereta Api Indonesia (KAI). It runs between Semarang Poncol and Surabaya Pasarturi and was introduced as a new daily service on this route on 4 October 2016.

== History ==
Ambarawa Express was launched to coincide with the 71st anniversary of KAI. It was introduced as a replacement for the Cepu Express and Blora Jaya Express services, which were discontinued. It was launched after KAI introduced the Maharani, providing another daily service on the same corridor. At the time of its inauguration, the train used eight air-conditioned economy coaches with 2+2 seating, providing a total of 640 seats. Facilities included air conditioning, power outlets, and improved seating comfort compared with the older economy services. Travel time for the full route is approximately five hours.

Initially, the service operated using former Menoreh morning train sets that had been withdrawn due to low occupancy. The train consisted of economy-class coaches built by INKA and included both standard 80-seat cars and 64-seat disability-friendly cars, with a total capacity of around 524 passengers per departure.

The name "Ambarawa" comes from a district of Ambarawa in Semarang Regency, which is known for its military history, such as Fort Willem I and the Ambarawa Railway Museum. The naming was intended as a tribute to local historical heritage.

Initial schedules set the departure from Semarang Poncol at 07.00 WIB and from Surabaya Pasar Turi early to mid-afternoon. KAI projected that the route would attract passengers who were not accommodated by other trains operating on the corridor, such as Maharani.

On 6 July 2017, the schedule of Ambarawa Express was adjusted and its train sets were shared with the Blora Jaya Express, as the later switched to "New Image" economy coaches that were taken from the Ambarawa Express when idle.

On 1 April 2022, during the 2022 Lebaran travel period, KAI Daop 8 Surabaya operated two Ambarawa Express services as additional trains on the Surabaya Pasar Turi–Semarang Poncol route, each with different departure times from Surabaya.

== Routine train sets ==
Based on the enactment of new train travel chart 2025, the train layout for Ambarawa Express 1 and 2 is as follows.

Ambarawa Express 1 (265–266) use the "New Image" type train sets allocated by the Semarang Poncol Train Depot, consisting of seven economy class cars, one dining car, and one power train.

Meanwhile, Ambarawa Express 2 (263–264) uses stainless steel train sets derived from the Kertajaya. They consist of 14 premium economy class cars, one dining car, and one power train.

== Stations ==
Ambarawa Express route is:

- Semarang Poncol (Start/End)
- Semarang Tawang
- Ngrombo
- Kradenan
- Randublatung
- Cepu
- Bojonegoro
- Babat
- Lamongan
- Surabaya Pasarturi (Start/End)
