= Kertajaya (train) =

Passenger train in Indonesia

Kertajaya train

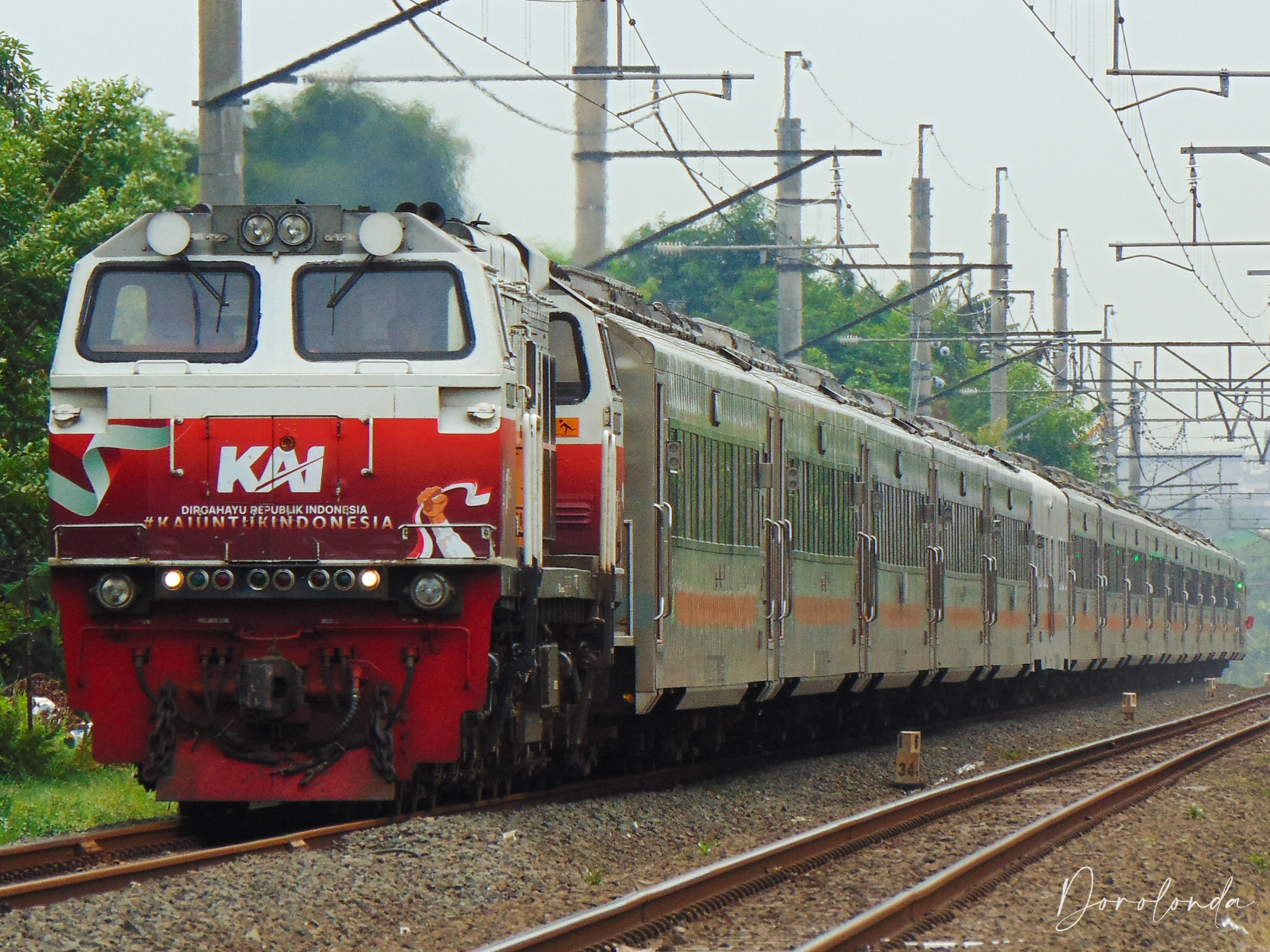
- Kertajaya train with the longest stainless steel car, 2022

Overview
- Service type: Inter-city rail
- Status: Operational
- Predecessor: Gaya Baru Malam Utara
- First service: 1994
- Current operator: Kereta Api Indonesia

Route
- Termini: Pasar Senen; Surabaya Pasarturi
- Distance travelled: 719 km (446 mil)
- Average journey time: 10 hours 44 minutes
- Service frequency: 1x daily each way
- Train numbers: 253-254 (regular); 7017-7018 (addition)

On-board services
- Classes: premium economy (regular); executive & economy (addition)
- Seating arrangements: 50 seats arranged 2-2; (Executive Class) Seats can recline and swivel: 80 seats arranged 2-2, facing left and facing right; (Premium Economy Class) Seats can recline: 80 seats arranged 2-2. 40 seats face right and 40 seats face left; (Economy Class)
- Catering facilities: On-board cafe and trolley service

Technical
- Rolling stock: CC206
- Track gauge: 1067 mm
- Operating speed: 80 - 100 km/h (50 - 62 mph)
Route map

Kertajaya train is an passenger train with the premium economy class that is operated by Kereta Api Indonesia which between Pasar Senen & Surabaya Pasarturi.

The Kertajaya train only 1x daily each way travel around 719 km (446 mil) in 10 hours 44 minutes for traveling from Jakarta & Surabaya.

== Branding ==
The name Kertajaya comes from the name of the last king of the Kediri Kingdom named Kertajaya with the title Sri Maharaja Srengga who ruled around 1194-1222 AD. With a train length of 320 m, the Kertajaya train is a train with the longest intercity train series on the northern line of Java Island and in Indonesia along with the Ambarawa Express, and Jayakarta train.

== History ==
Before the Kertajaya train was launched, there was a Surabaya–Jakarta train service operating as of 25 December 1971, namely the Gaya Baru Malam Utara train. After rationalization by PT KA, the train stopped operating as of 21 January 2002.

Then around 1994, the Kertajaya train operated. Initially, the Kertajaya train operated using economy class trains made by Industri Kereta Api (INKA) from 2003 to 2005. In addition, this train set was once coupled with a blue baggage car before the baggage car fire on 27 November 2013.

On 4 December 2015, KAI launched the Kertajaya addition train with a long train set consisting of one power dining car, 14 economy class cars, and one power dining car business class (MP2). The long train set was then diverted to regular trips.

In 2019, PT INKA with A 2019 INKA premium economy class stainless steel train set is used for the Kertajaya train operation. The Kertajaya train set had a long rest period at Surabaya Pasarturi Station so that the train set was used for the Maharani train operation in the morning before its operation was suspended starting 1 October 2021. On 1 April 2022, this train set, which was resting at the Surabaya Pasarturi Train Depot, was used for the Ambarawa Ekspres II train operation.

On 1 April 2020, the Kertajaya train stop has been shifted from Semarang Tawang to Semarang Poncol.

Starting 19 June 2022, the Kertajaya train will add a stop at Cikarang.

== List of the Station ==
Here's the Kertajaya train route from Jakarta to Surabaya based from the Gapeka 2025.

- Pasarsenen (Start/End)
- Bekasi
- Cikarang
- Pegaden Baru
- Haurgeulis
- Jatibarang
- Cirebon Prujakan
- Brebes
- Tegal
- Pekalongan
- Weleri
- Semarang Poncol
- Ngrombo
- Randublatung
- Cepu
- Bojonegoro
- Babat
- Lamongan
- Surabaya Pasarturi (Start/End)

== Incident ==
- On 25 March 2004, the Kertajaya train derailment before entering Benowo Station in the Raci area, Benowo, Surabaya because the train went off the track resulting in 10 passengers being injured.
- On 15 April 2006 at 02.10 local time, the Kertajaya train collided with the Sembrani in Gubug The accident occurred when the Kertajaya train left the railway track prematurely while crossing the Sembrani train coming from behind. This was caused by a malfunction in the Kertajaya train's radio channel switch, which prevented the Kertajaya train driver from receiving news of the Sembrani train overtaking the Kertajaya train from the PPKA, and there were many passengers in the driver's cabin. The incident resulted in 13 deaths and 26 others being hospitalized.
- On 27 November 2013, the cargo car of the Kertajaya train that blue burned.
- On 25 August 2016, One economy class train (K3) and the power dining car (MP2) of the Kertajaya train caught fire.
- On 21 February 2017 at 04.00, A passenger was found carrying a Sanca snake on train 14 of the Kertajaya addition train on the Surabaya-Jakarta route. The snake was then captured and dropped off at Tegal at 04:48. None of the passengers admitted ownership when internal security officers (PKD) and the Indonesian National Armed Forces (TNI) questioned the snake's ownership.

== See also ==
- Gumarang
- Airlangga
- Dharmawangsa
