= Mesigit railway station =

Railway station in Indonesia

Mesigit Station Stasiun Mesigit
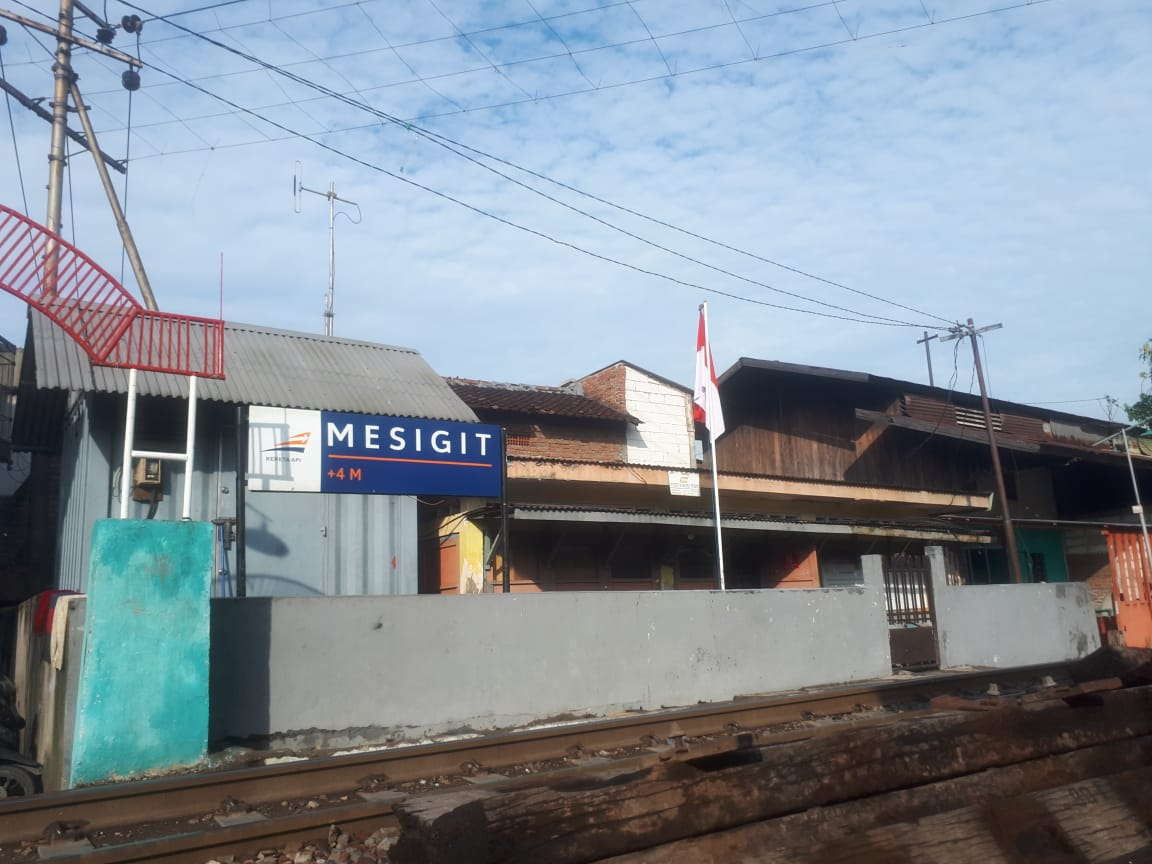
- Exterior view of Mesigit Station, 2020

General information
- Location: Jepara, Bubutan, Surabaya; East Java; Indonesia
- Coordinates: 7.241161°S 112.726896°E
- Elevation: 4 m (13 ft)
- Owner: Kereta Api Indonesia
- Operator: Kereta Api Indonesia (Daop 8 Surabaya)
- Tracks: 2

Construction
- Structure type: Ground

Other information
- Status: Used solely for monitoring train traffic
- Station code: MST
- Classification: III / small station

History
- Opened: Circa 1900–1905
- Former names: Halte Missigit
Location
- Location within Surabaya

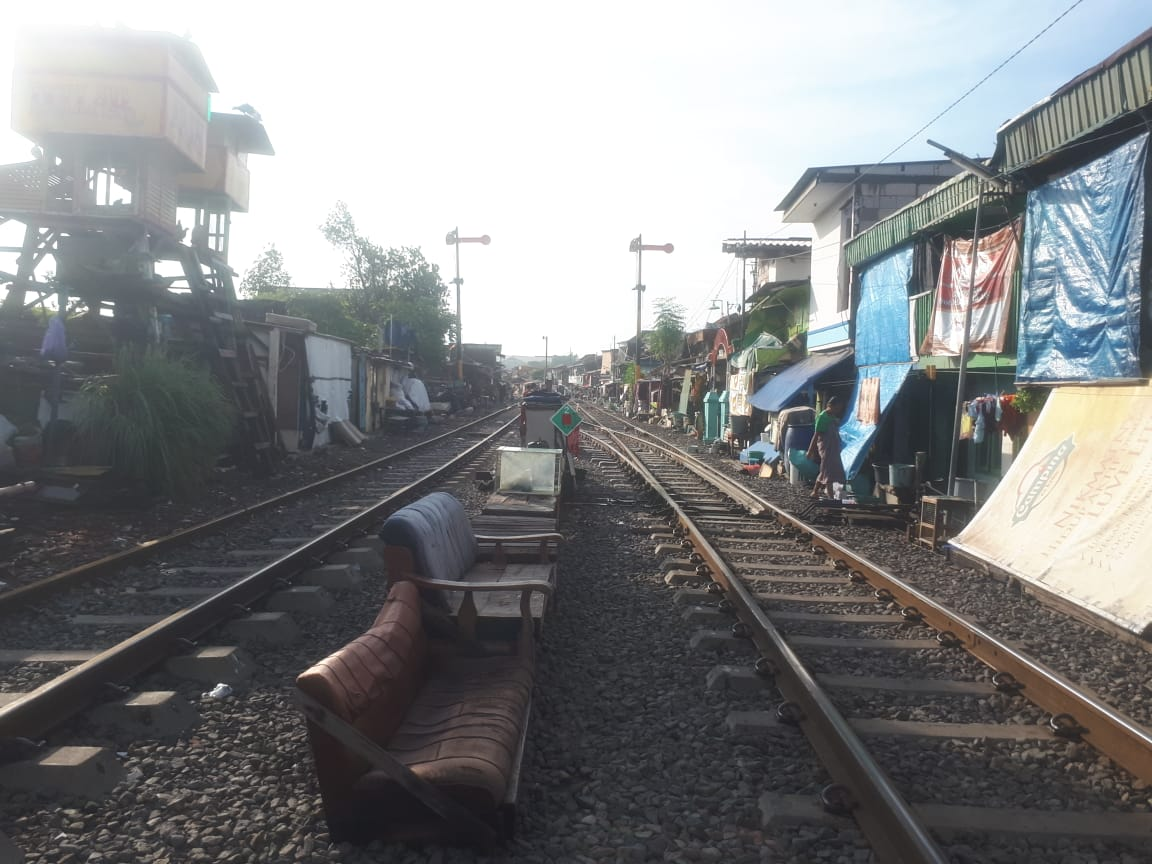
The rail yard east of Mesigit Station, 2020. The station has a branching track layout: to the left toward Sidotopo Station and Surabaya Gubeng Station, and to the right toward Surabaya Pasarturi Station.

Mesigit Station (MST) is a class III/small railway station located in Jepara, Bubutan, Surabaya and is operated by Kereta Api Indonesia under Operation Area VIII Surabaya at an elevation of +4 meters.

The station was formerly an island station and had four tracks: two belonging to the Nederlandsch-Indische Spoorweg Maatschappij and two belonging to the Staatsspoorwegen, with track 1 serving as the main through track.

Currently, only two tracks remain in operation, and the station now uses a newer building. The station's original building has since been converted into a residential area.

This station is a railway junction where the line from Sidotopo Station branches via the elevated track toward Surabaya Kota Station and Surabaya Pasarturi Station, continuing to Kalimas Station. As a result, the station currently functions only as a monitoring post, while control of the switches at the Mesigit triangle was transferred to Surabaya Pasarturi Station in 2014 following the operation of the northern double-track line and the introduction of the Jayabaya train service.

The track segment between Kalimas Station and the signal post at the Mesigit triangle runs through densely packed residential areas, preventing trains from operating at speeds higher than 20 km/h. In 2012, PT KAI planned to clear the settlements along this section, but the plan was canceled due to strong opposition from local residents.

The station is also part of the Surabaya Pasarturi wye, which is used to turn locomotives. This function is only used if the locomotive turntable at the Surabaya Pasarturi locomotive subdepot is out of service.

One unique aspect of this station is that the inbound signal from the Pasarturi direction uses an electric signal system rather than the mechanical type used at the rest of the station.

== Incident ==
On 3 October 2015, a container freight wagon derailed on the section between Mesigit and Surabaya Pasarturi Station. One person was killed after being struck by debris from a nearby building caused by the derailment. The incident also disrupted container train services to and from Kalimas.

== Gallery ==
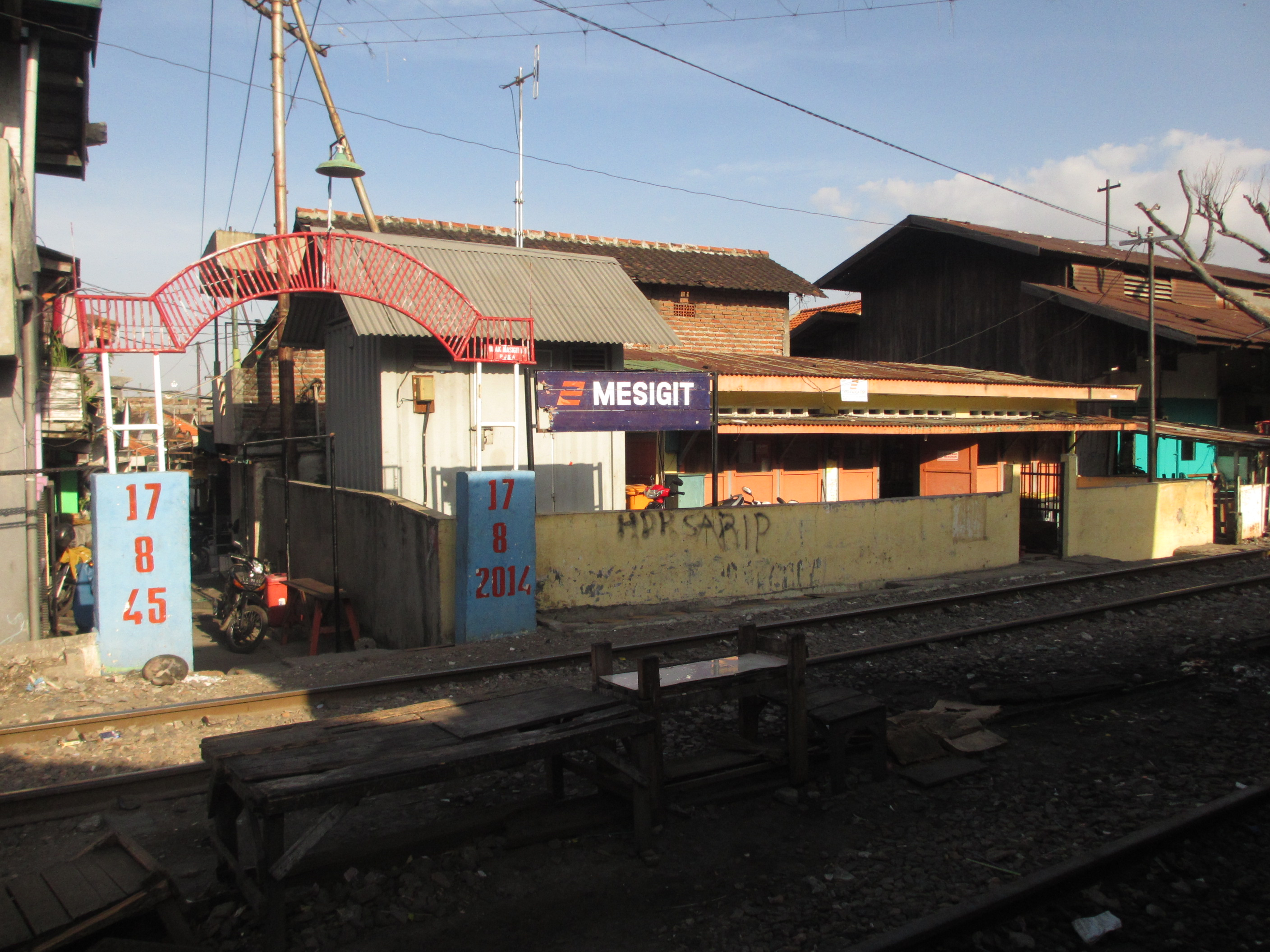
Exterior view of Mesigit Station, 2015

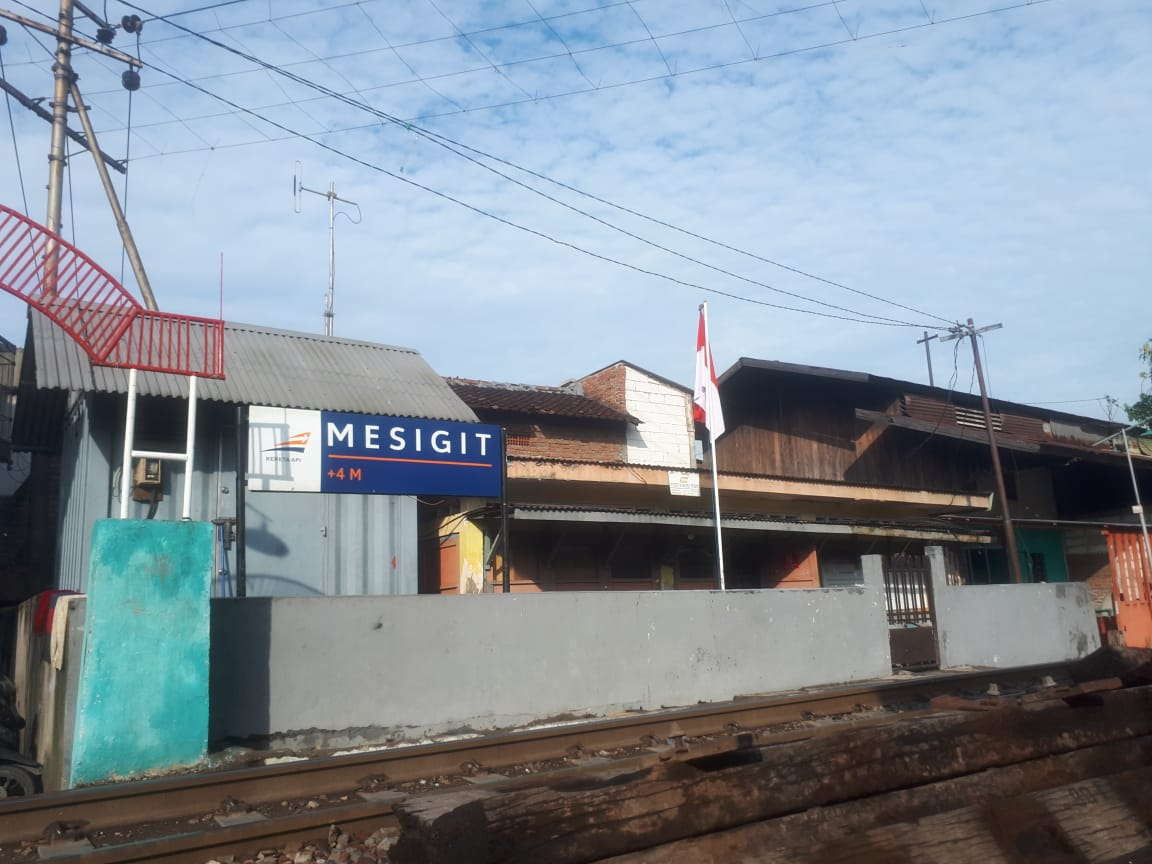
Exterior view of Mesigit Station, 2020

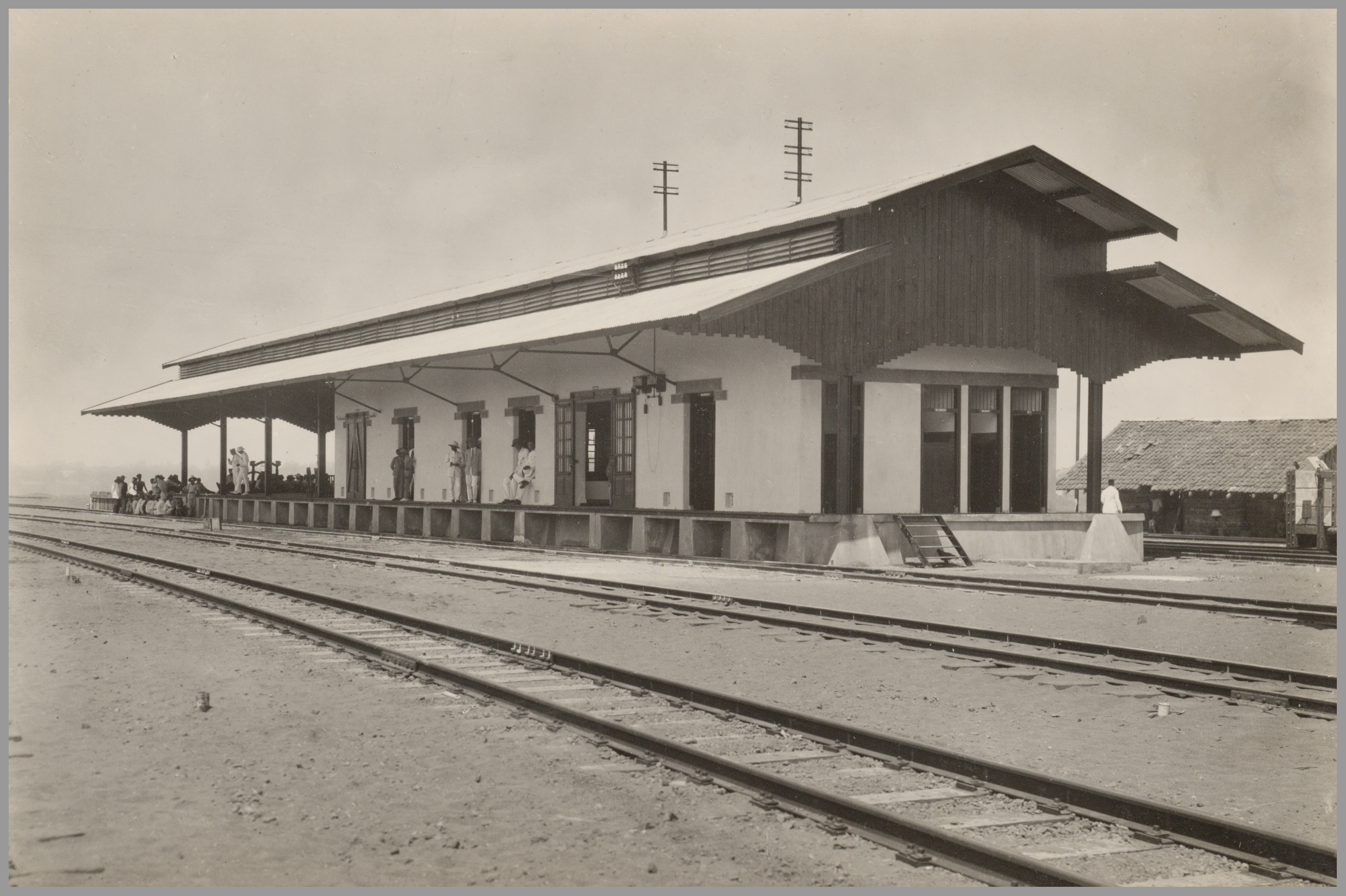
Missigit halt during the Dutch East Indies period

Preceding station	Kereta Api Indonesia	Following station
Kalimas	Kalimas–Sidotopo line	Sidotopo
Mesigit	Mesigit–Surabaya Pasarturi line	Surabaya Pasarturi
