= Menoreh =

Indonesian passenger train service

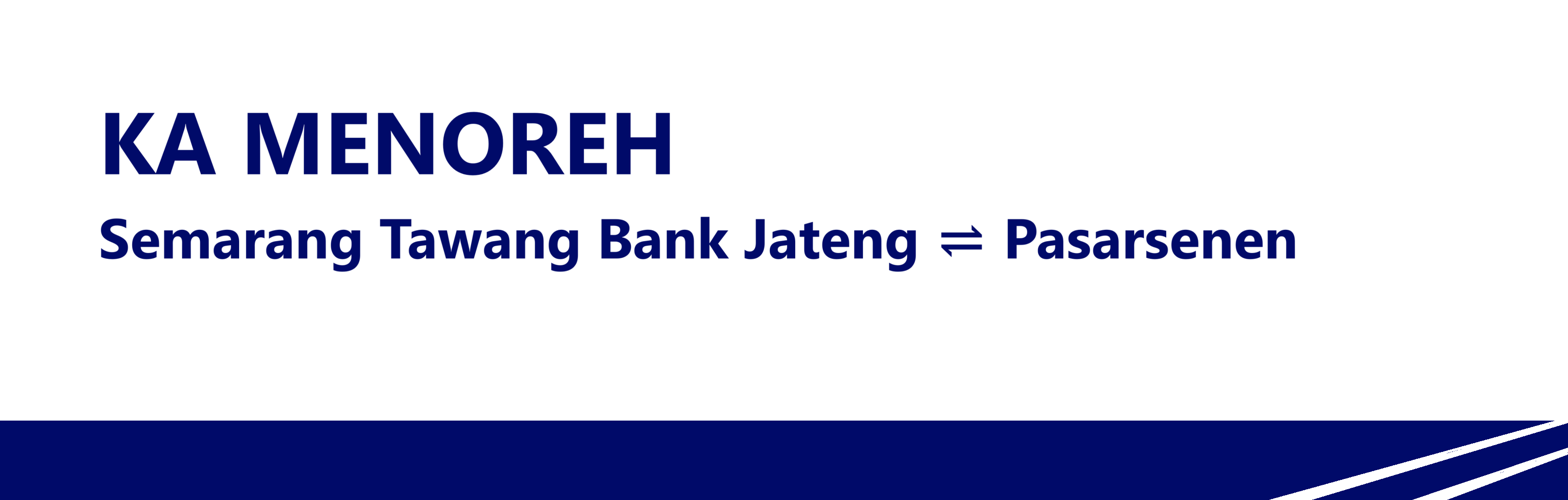

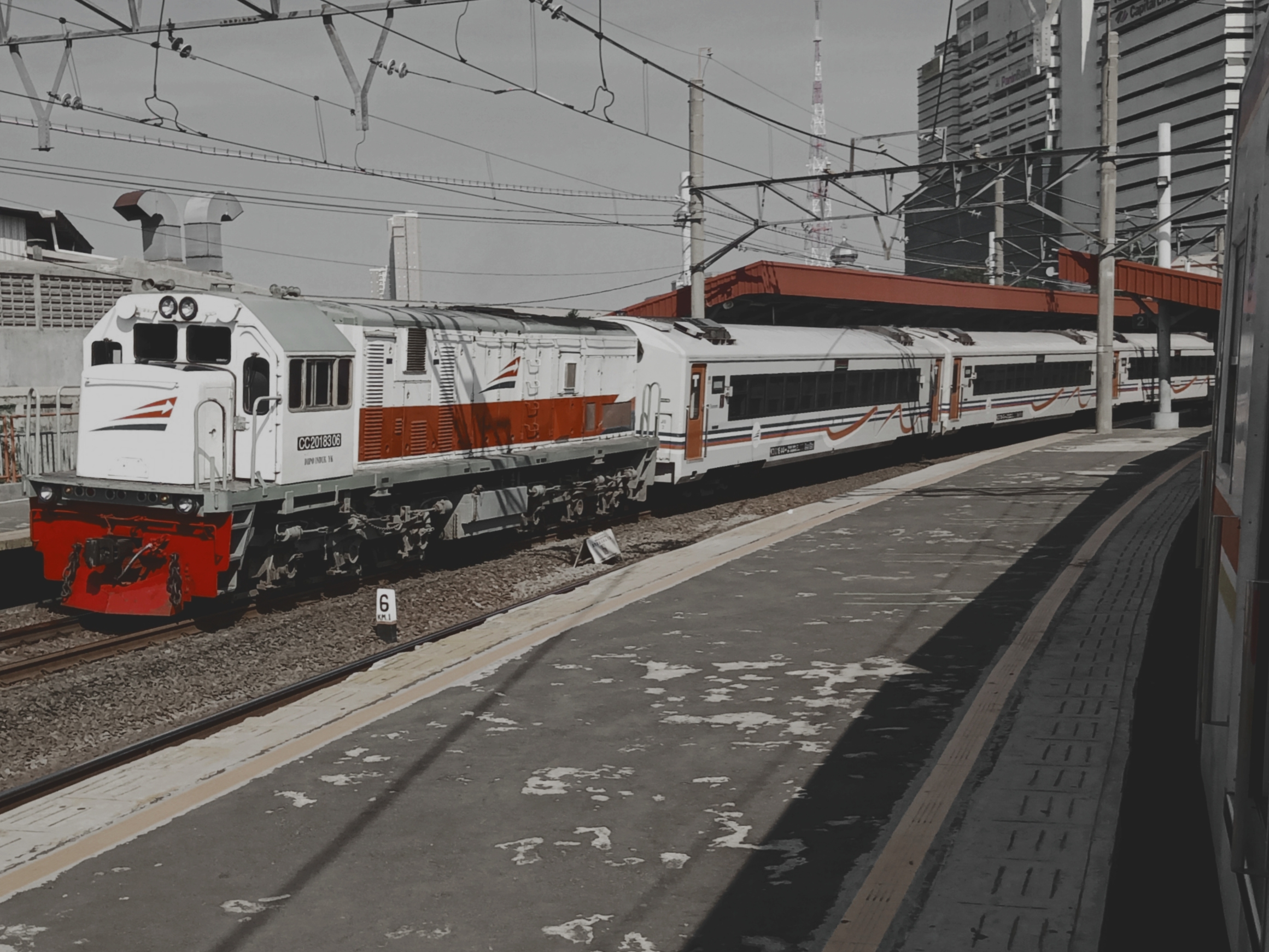
- Menoreh train passing in Kampung Bandan heading to Jakarta Kota, 2019

Overview
- Service type: Inter-city rail
- Status: Operational
- Locale: Operational Area I Jakarta and Operational Area IV Semarang
- Predecessor: Fajar and Senja Utama Semarang
- First service: 21 September 2012
- Current operator: Kereta Api Indonesia

Route
- Termini: Semarang Poncol; Pasar Senen
- Distance travelled: 439 kilometres (273 miles)
- Average journey time: 5 hours 58 minutes
- Service frequency: daily each way
- Train number: 175-177

On-board services
- Classes: executive and economy
- Seating arrangements: 50 seats arranged 2-2 (executive class); 80 seats arranged 2-2 (economy class)
- Catering facilities: On-board cafe and trolley service

Technical
- Rolling stock: CC206; CC203; CC201
- Track gauge: 1,067 mm
- Operating speed: 80–120 kilometres per hour (50–75 mph)
Route map

Menoreh (Indonesian: Kereta Api Menoreh) is a passenger train service operating between Pasar Senen and Semarang Tawang in Java, Indonesia.

This train operates on the same route as the Tawang Jaya Premium.

== Origin ==
The name "Menoreh" is taken from the Menoreh Mountains, which span parts of Magelang Regency and Purworejo Regency in Central Java, as well as Kulon Progo Regency in the Special Region of Yogyakarta.

== History ==
On 21 September 2012, PT KAI launched the Menoreh train as the predecessor to the Fajar and Senja Utama Semarang services. With the implementation of the 2015 train schedule, the Menoreh train operated two daily services, one in the morning and one in the evening. However, the Menoreh I service (morning departure from Jakarta and evening return from Semarang) was discontinued on 4 October 2016 due to low occupancy. The released rolling stock was transferred to operate the Ambarawa Express service on the Semarang Poncol–Surabaya Pasar Turi route.

To reduce congestion at Pasar Senen Station, PT KAI later made several routing adjustments. One significant change was the extension of the Menoreh service to Jakarta Kota Station, which took effect on 29 May 2019.

Following the implementation of the 2021 schedule, the Menoreh train began stopping at Pegaden Baru Station (Jakarta Kota–bound) to accommodate passengers.

After the route extension, passenger numbers declined, and the service eventually returned to Pasar Senen Station starting 1 June 2023, following with the enactment of the 2023 schedule.

As of 16 January 2025, further changes were introduced to the Menoreh fleet. The modified new-generation economy class coaches were replaced with standard economy class coaches, and executive class coaches—reassigned from the Kamandaka train—were added. The displaced new-generation economy coaches were transferred to the Kamandaka service on the Semarang Tawang–Purwokerto–Cilacap route in preparation for the implementation of the 2025 timetable, effective 1 February 2025.

== Station list ==
As of 2025, the service calls at the following stations:

- Pasar Senen (start/end)
- Jatinegara
- Bekasi
- Cikarang
- Pegaden Baru
- Jatibarang
- Cirebon Prujakan
- Babakan
- Brebes
- Tegal
- Pemalang
- Pekalongan
- Batang
- Weleri
- Semarang Poncol
- Semarang Tawang (start/end)
