= Dharmawangsa Express =

Passenger train in Indonesia

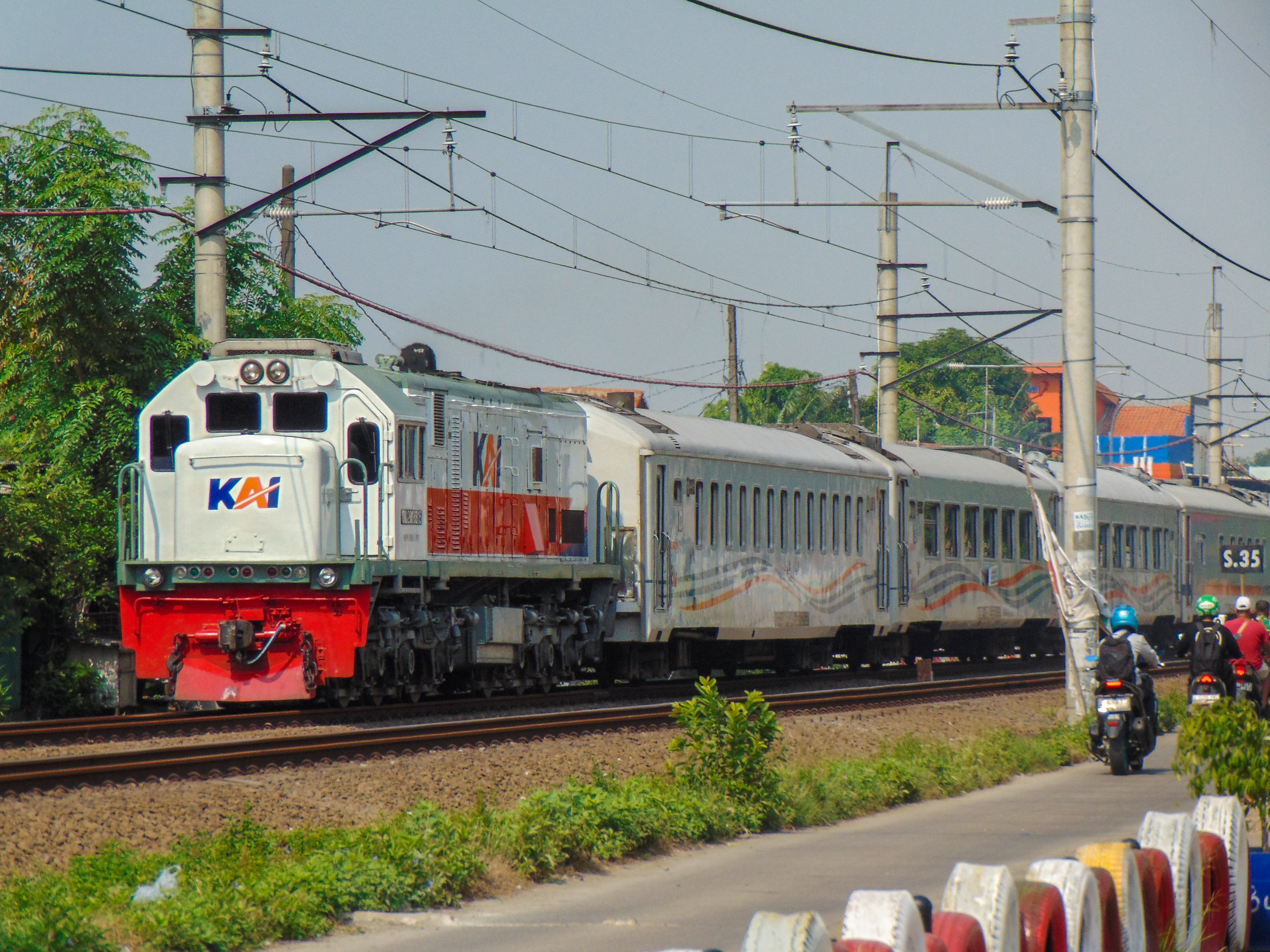
- Dharmawangsa 132 train passed at Tambun, 2023

Overview
- Service type: Inter-city rail
- Status: Operational
- First service: 2 December 2019
- Current operator: Kereta Api Indonesia

Route
- Termini: Jakarta Pasarsenen; Surabaya Pasarturi
- Distance travelled: 719 km (446 mil)
- Average journey time: 10 hours 54 minutes
- Service frequency: 1x daily each way
- Train number: 165 – 166

On-board services
- Classes: executive & economy
- Seating arrangements: 50 seats arranged 2-2 (executive class); 72 seats arranged 2-2 (economy class)
- Catering facilities: On-board cafe and trolley service

Technical
- Rolling stock: CC203; CC201
- Track gauge: 1067 mm
- Operating speed: 70 - 100 km/h (43 - 62 mph)
Route map

Dharmawangsa Express (also known as the Dharmawangsa) is an passenger train with the executive & economy that is operated by Kereta Api Indonesia which between Jakarta Pasarsenen & Surabaya Pasarturi via Semarang Poncol.

The Dharmawangsa train offer 1x daily each way around 719 km (446 mil) in 10 hours 54 minutes for the trip from Jakarta to Surabaya via Semarang.

== Branding ==
The name Dharmawangsa itself comes from the last king of the Medang Kingdom named Dharmawangsa Teguh who ruled around 991-1007 and was the successor and son of the previous Medang king, namely as Makutawangsawardhana who ruled around 985–990. According to the Sirah Keting inscription, Dharmawangsa Teguh's original name was Wijayamreta Wardhana.

== History & Operating ==
On 2 December 2019, PT KAI launching of the Dharmawangsa train which connecting between Jakarta Pasar Senen & Surabaya Pasarturi in Pasar Senen station by the President Director of PT Kereta Api Indonesia (Persero), Edi Sukmoro since the implementation of the 2019 Gapeka trip. The Dharmawangsa Train is operated using an alternating train pattern with the Brantas, both of which change trains in Jakarta.

On 17 October 2024, the Dharmawangsa and Brantas train has been using the latest generation of economy class trains previously used by the Jayabaya train. These economy class trains are the result of modifications by the Manggarai Railway Center from the previous trains, reducing the number of seats from 80 to 72.

== List of the Station ==
Here's the Dharmawangsa train route as an alternate from Jakarta to Semarang than the Brantas train.

- Pasarsenen (Start/End)
- Jatinegara
- Bekasi
- Karawang (only bound to Surabaya)
- Pegaden Baru
- Haurgeulis
- Cirebon Prujakan
- Babakan
- Tanjung
- Brebes
- Tegal
- Pekalongan
- Weleri
- Semarang Poncol
- Ngrombo
- Cepu
- Bojonegoro
- Babat
- Lamongan
- Surabaya Pasarturi (Start/End)
