= Surabaya Pasarturi railway station =

Railway station in Indonesia

Surabaya Pasarturi railway station Stasiun Surabaya Pasarturi B01 J01 A14

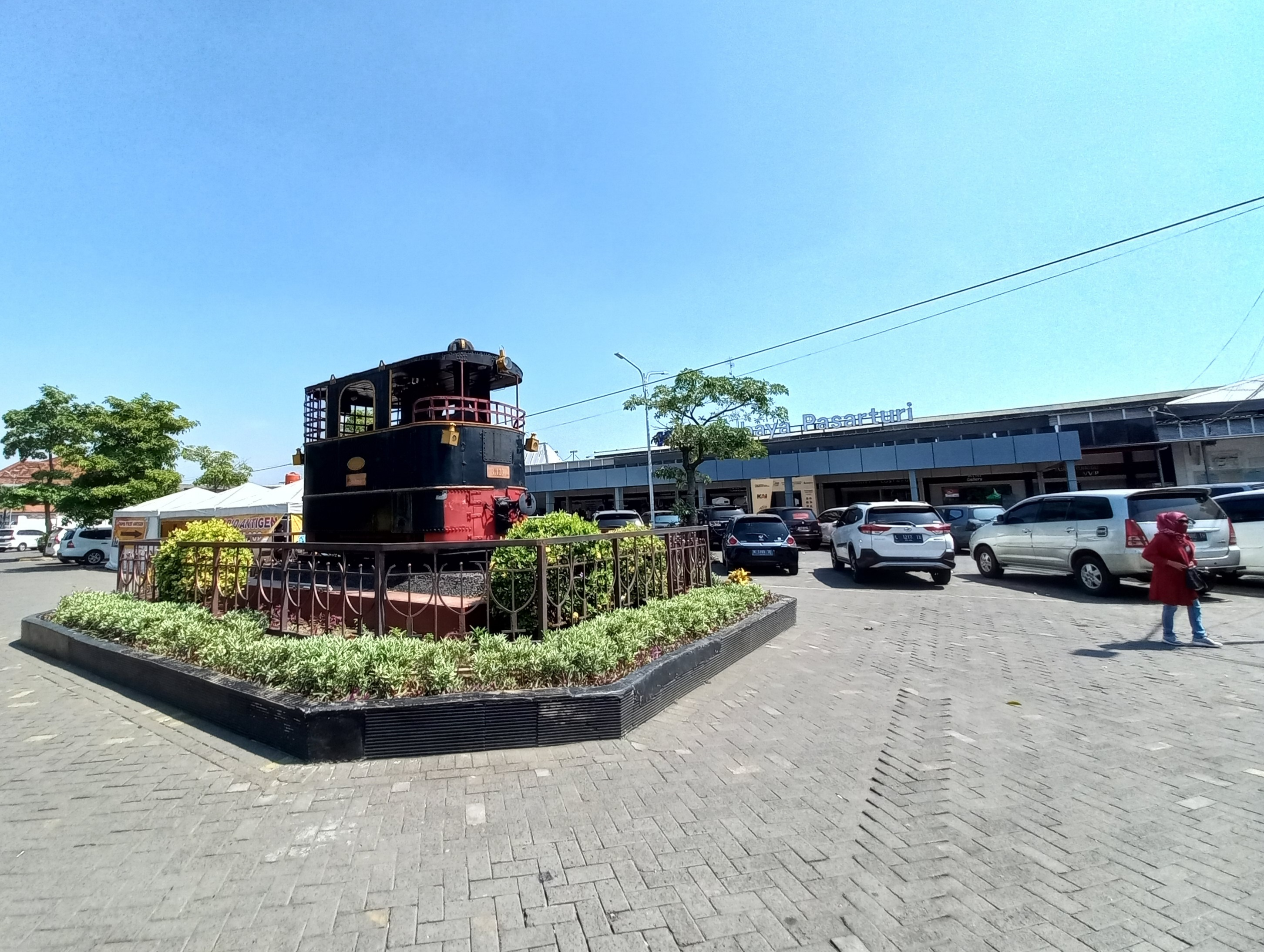
- Surabaya Pasar Turi Station in 2022 and the B1239 locomotive monument

General information
- Location: Jl. Semarang No. 1, Gundih, Bubutan, Surabaya 60172; Indonesia
- Coordinates: 7°14′53″S 112°43′52″E
- Elevation: +1 m (3.3 ft)
- Owner: Kereta Api Indonesia
- Operator: Kereta Api Indonesia; Kereta Api Logistik
- Lines: Gambringan–Surabaya Pasar Turi; Surabaya Railway; Pasarturi–Gubeng Railway
- Platforms: 1 side platform 3 Island platforms
- Tracks: 8
- Connections: Suroboyo Bus: R1

Construction
- Structure type: Ground
- Parking: Available
- Accessible: Available

Other information
- Station code: SBI • 4500
- Classification: Large type A

History
- Opened: 1 April 1900; 126 years ago
- Former names: Soerabaja NIS Station

Services
Preceding station		Following station
Tandes B02 towards Cepu	Commuter Line Blorasura	Terminus
Tandes A15 towards Babat or Bojonegoro	Commuter Line Arjonegoro Terminus for some services	Surabaya Gubeng A13 towards Sidoarjo
Tandes J22 towards Indro or Babat	Commuter Line Jenggala	Surabaya Gubeng J02 towards Mojokerto
Location
- Location within Surabaya

Surabaya Pasar Turi Station or Surabaya Pasarturi Station (SBI) is the second largest railway station in Surabaya, East Java. It is located near the Pasar Turi market in Bubutan. It is the main departure point of trains from Surabaya which passes through Pantura to the western cities of Java. Trains south and east line depart from Surabaya Gubeng. Since 2014, the station has upgraded railway signal and railroad switch devices to electrical type.

== History ==
Unlike other stations in Surabaya which were built by Staatsspoorwegen (SS) and Oost-Java Stoomtram Maatschappij (OJSM), Surabaya Pasarturi Station was built by the first private railway company in the Dutch East Indies, Nederlandsch-Indische Spoorweg Maatschappij (NIS). After making profits in the 1890s, NIS applied for concessions to build new lines, and they received a concession for the construction of a new Gundih–Gambringan–Bojonegoro–Surabaya railway line on 1 September 1897. To accommodate passengers from Gresik, a branch route to Gresik was built. In addition, a railway line from Babat to Merakurak was also built.

The station as well as the Lamongan-Surabaya railway line began operation on 1 April 1900. On 15 October 1900, the Gundih-Kradenan section of the line was completed and the construction continued to Bojonegoro. The line was completed entirely on 1 February 1903.

The name "Surabaya Pasarturi" was given since the Railway Department (Indonesian: Djawatan Kereta Api) began to record stations in Indonesia in the 1950s. The station is named "Pasar Turi" because there is a market with the same name.

== Building and layout ==
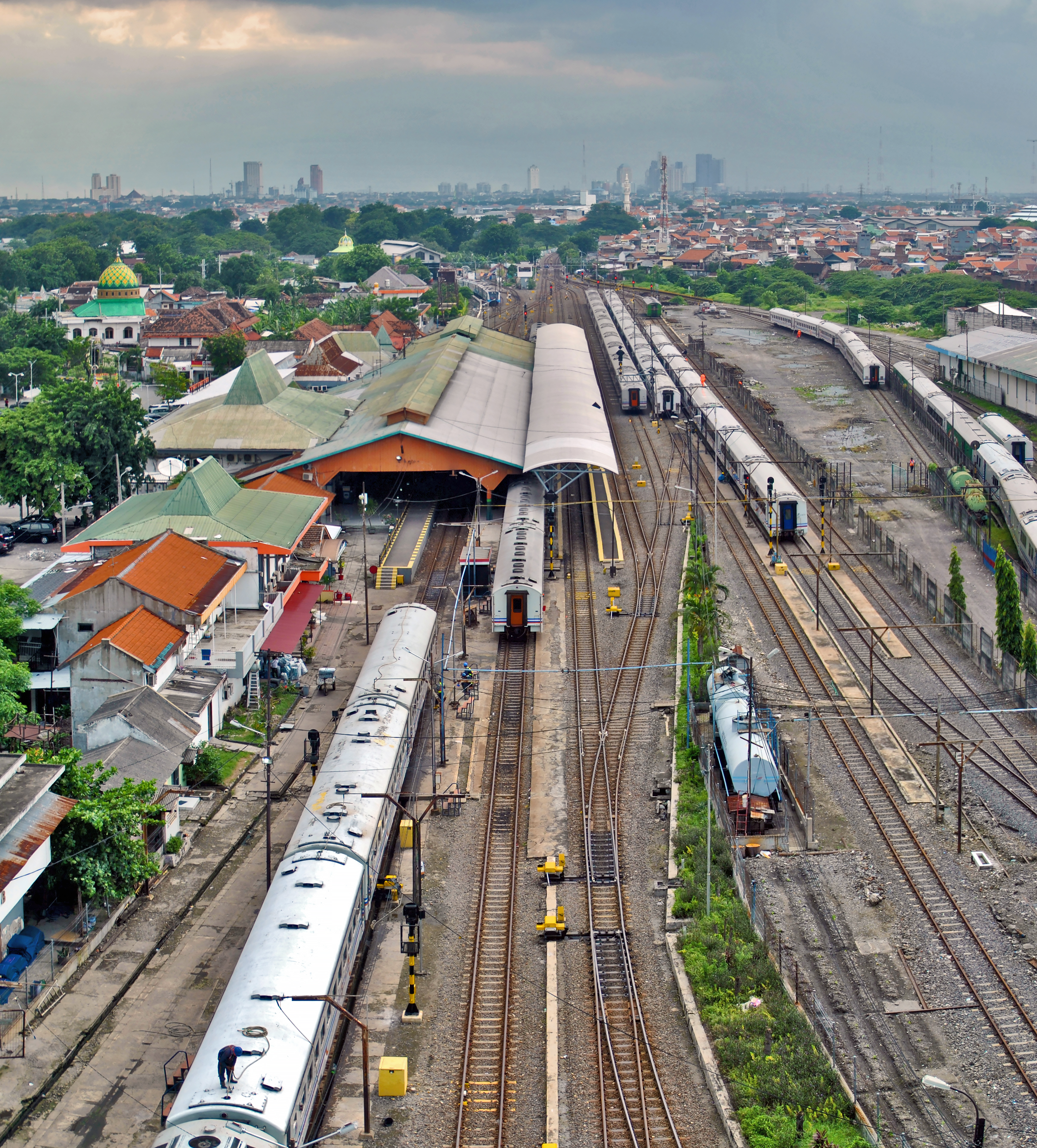
Surabaya Pasar Turi Station

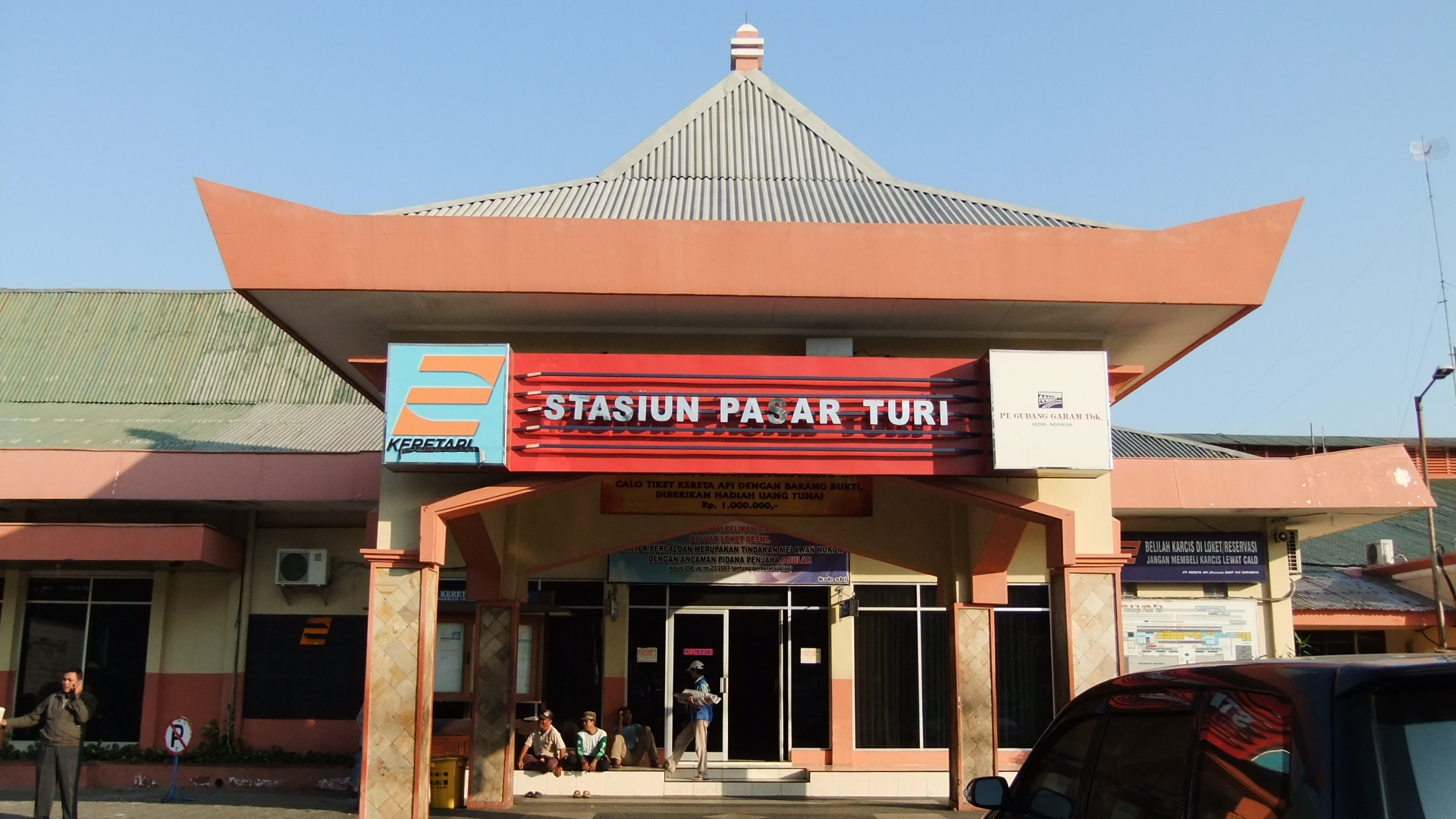
Surabaya Pasar Turi station entrance in 2009

Surabaya Pasarturi Station has eight railway tracks. Initially, track 2 was a straight track from and to Jakarta and Semarang, while track 3 was a main track to and from Surabaya Gubeng/Sidotopo and Kalimas. After the double track on the segment from this station to Kandangan was officially in operation on 3 September 2014, track 2 is currently a double track straight line from Jakarta-Semarang and track 3 is a double track straight line towards Semarang-Jakarta.

Since July 2014, the mechanical signaling system at the station has been replaced with an electric one made by PT Len Industri.

The station is equipped with a locomotive depot to the south and a train depot to the west. To the north of this station is a railway line under the wholesale center building before a junction north of the level crossing of Jalan Dupak — to Kalimas (westward) and Sidotopo as well as a shortcut to Surabaya Gubeng (eastward).

In 2019, the side platform of the station was extended and a canopy was added to support longer passenger trains.

The station is part of the rail wye used to turn locomotives; only used if the turntables in the locomotive depot are not functioning.

Apart from serving long-distance trains and local trains, Surabaya Pasar Turi Station is also used as a parking yard for the Jayakarta train, which was originally parked at Surabaya Kota Station.

== Services ==
The following is a list of train services at the Surabaya Pasar Turi Station

=== Executive Class ===
- Argo Bromo Anggrek to Gambir
- Sembrani to Gambir
- Additional Sembrani (Anjasmoro) to Gambir
- Pandalungan to Gambir and Jember
- Argo Anjasmoro to Gambir

=== Mixed Class (executive, business and economy) ===
- Gumarang to Pasar Senen
- Dharmawangsa to Pasar Senen
- Harina to Bandung via Semarang Tawang
- Mutiara Timur to Ketapang (Banyuwangi)
- Blambangan Express to Ketapang (Banyuwangi) and Pasar Senen
- Sancaka Utara (English: Northern Sancaka) to Cilacap station

=== Premium Economy Class ===
- Kertajaya to Pasar Senen
- Ambarawa Express to Semarang Poncol

=== Economy Plus Class ===
- Ambarawa Express to Semarang Poncol
- Jayabaya to Pasar Senen and Malang
- Airlangga to Pasar Senen

=== Local and Commuter Train ===
- Sindro Commuter Line to Indro and Sidoarjo
- Bojonegoro Local Train/Arjonegoro Commuter Line to Bojonegoro and Sidoarjo
- Cepu Local (Blorasura) Train to Cepu

== Supporting transportation ==
Source: Surabaya City Office of Transportation

Public transportation type	Route	Destination
City bus	F	Purabaya–Jembatan Merah Plaza
City bus	P3	Larangan bus terminal (Sidoarjo)–Jembatan Merah Plaza
City bus	P5	Purabaya–Jembatan Merah Plaza (via Toll Road)
Bemo	C	Morokrembangan–Pasar Rakyat Karang Menjangan
Bemo	D	Surabaya Islamic Hospital–Pegirian
Bemo	WK	Tambak Osowilangun bus terminal–Keputih bus terminal
Bemo	Q	Jembatan Merah Plaza–Bratang bus terminal
Bemo	RT	Surabaya Pasarturi Station–Pasar Baru Rungkut
Bemo	BJ	Benowo bus terminal–Jembatan Merah Plaza
Suroboyo Bus	R1	Purabaya–Rajawali (at Pirngadi bus stop)

== Incidents ==
- On 9 May 2005, two train sets of the Argo Bromo Anggrek train caught fire at Surabaya Pasarturi Station yard. There were no casualties from the fire. The fire was suspected to have been caused by an electrical short circuit in the dining car and then spread to the series of executive class trains behind.
- On 3 October 2015, a container carriage derailed in the Surabaya Pasarturi–Mesigit section. One person was killed when the ruins of the building collapsed due to the fall of the container carriage, and it hampered the journey of the container train to and from Kalimas.
- On 20 April 2021 at 19:20, the ceiling in the economy class waiting room at Surabaya Pasar Turi Station collapsed and hit the chairs. Given the situation that was still quiet, there were no casualties in the incident. As a result, the waiting room was closed. Preliminary allegations said that the ceiling of collapsed due to age factor.

== Gallery ==
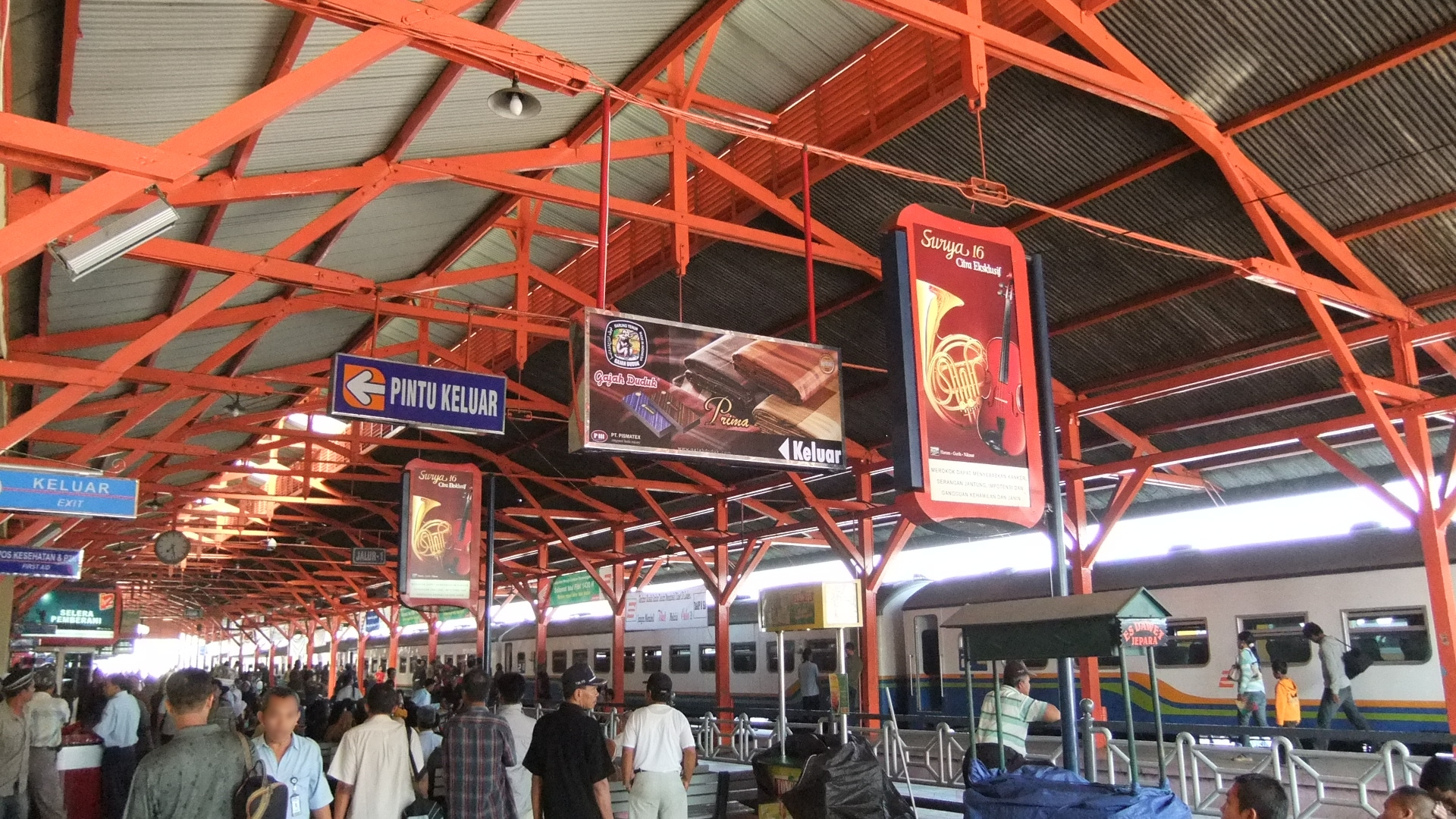
The canopy of the station platform in 2009

Preceding station	Kereta Api Indonesia	Following station
Tandes towards Gambringan	Gambringan–Surabaya Pasar Turi	Terminus
Terminus	Surabaya Railway; SBI–SGU	Surabaya Gubeng; Terminus
Terminus	Surabaya Railway; SBI–MST–KLM	Mesigit towards Kalimas
