= Cirebon (train) =

Passenger train Jakarta - Cirebon service in Indonesia

Cirebon Facultative
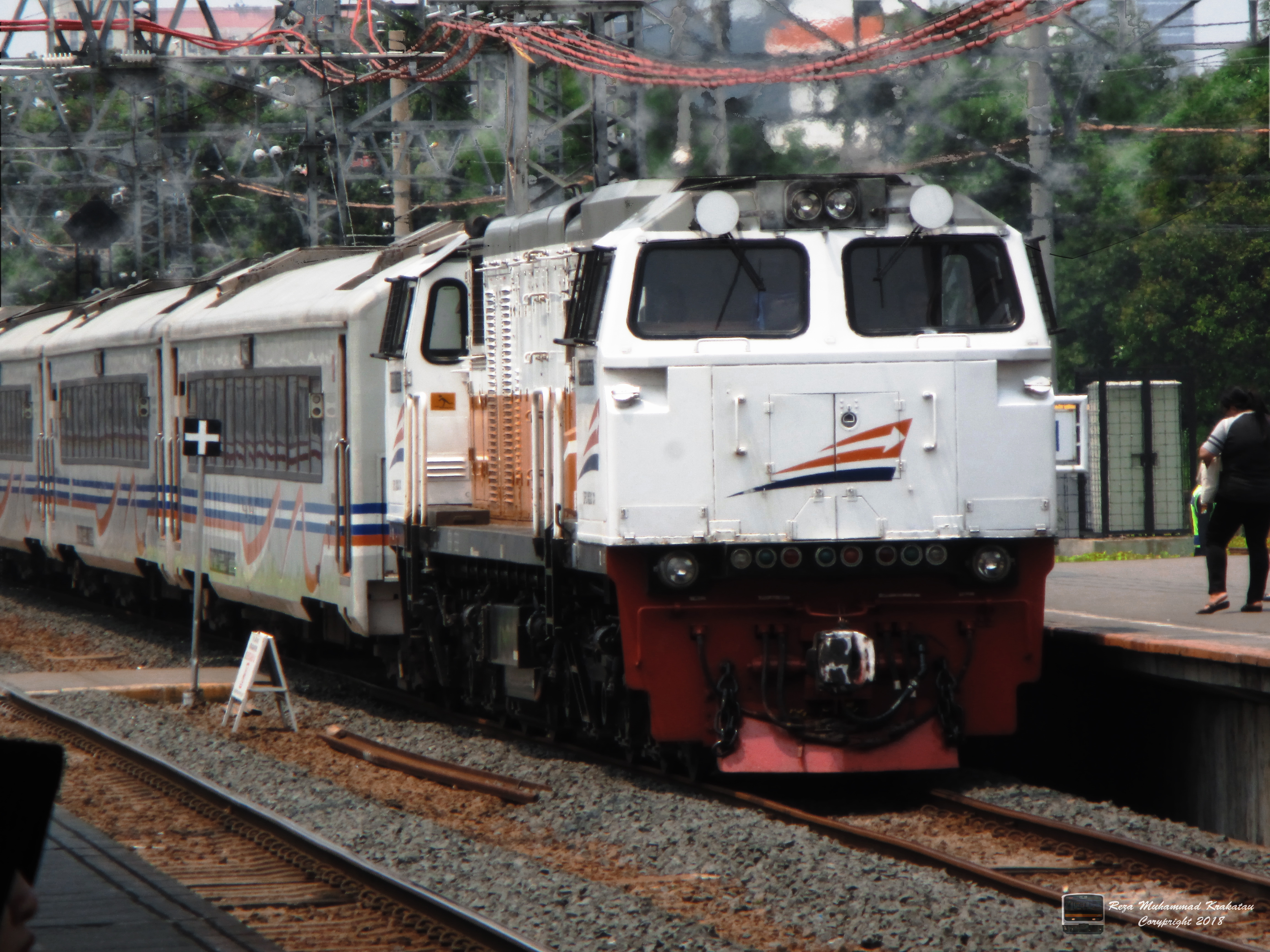
- Cirebon Express before to the Argo Cheribon, 2018

Overview
- Service type: Inter-city rail
- Status: Operational (facultative)
- Locale: Operational Area III Cirebon
- Predecessor: Gunungjati (1973--1992); Cirebon Express (1989-2019); Argo Jati (2007-2010; 2010-2019); Cirebon Express Tegal (2007-2014); Tegal Bahari (2014-2019; 2022-present) (Pasar Senen-Tegal line diverted with executive and economy class)
- First service: August 16, 2019 (Argo Cheribon); 1 February 2025 (Cirebon Facultative)
- Last service: 31 January 2025 (Argo Cheribon)
- Successor: Gunungjati train (extended to Semarang Tawang on 1 February 2025); Cakrabuana train (extended to Purwokerto on 1 February 2025)
- Current operator: Kereta Api Indonesia

Route
- Termini: Gambir: Cirebon
- Distance travelled: 345 kilometres (214 miles)
- Average journey time: 2 hours 57 minutes
- Service frequency: daily each way (facultative)
- Train number: 125F-126F

On-board services
- Classes: economy and executive
- Seating arrangements: 50 seats arranged 2-2 (executive class); 72 seats arranged 2-2 (economy class)
- Catering facilities: On-board cafe and trolley service

Technical
- Rolling stock: CC206
- Track gauge: 1,067 mm
- Operating speed: 80–120 kilometres per hour (50–75 mph)

Cirebon Facultative is an Indonesian passenger train operated by Kereta Api Indonesia (KAI). It serves the Gambir–Cirebon route and provides both executive and economy class services. The train is operated on a facultative basis, meaning it only runs on certain dates when needed, such as during peak travel periods or holidays.

== History ==
=== Pre-Cirebon Express ===
A passenger train service between Jakarta and Cirebon has been operating since the 1950s. On 6 November 1952, a 1952 train travel chart was release for Java, Madura, and South Sumatra, increasing the Jakarta–Cirebon service to three round trips per day. Later, with the implementation of the 1954 train travel chart on 3 November 1954, the number of round trips on the route was increased to four per day.

On 24 December 1971, the Jatinegara–Cirebon Express was launched, which would cut travel time from 4 hours 30 minutes to 3 hours 15 minutes. This train was launched by the then Director General of Land Transportation, Soempono Bajoeadji, at Cirebon Station. This train was eventually replaced by the Gunungjati train, inaugurated on 1 February 1973, by the Minister of Transportation Frans Seda, the Mayor of Cirebon, Tatang Suwardi, and the Head of National Development Planning Agency Widjojo Nitisastro, to commemorate Cirebon's 602nd anniversary. This train had two round trips a day and took 2.5 hours. After the inauguration of this train, no other trains carried the name "Cirebon".

=== Cirebon Express (1984–2019) ===
On 10 May 1984, KAI (then known as PJKA) issued the new train travel chart for 1984. Under the new train travel chart, the Gunungjati operational pattern was divided into three services: the MBW 302 Gunungjati DMU operating Cirebon–Jakarta Kota round trips via Gambir, an express service on the Tegal–Jakarta Kota round trip route (which later became the Tegal Arum train), and an express service on the Cirebon–Jakarta Kota round trip route via Pasar Senen, which would later become the Cirebon Express.

During the facultative operation for the Lebaran trains from 7 May 1987 to 31 May 1988, the reputation of the Cirebon Express rose, resulting in its designation as a Class II service. Meanwhile, the Gunungjati service experienced a downgrade to Class III and also began operating on the Jakarta–Tegal round trip route, which a few months later was branded as Tegal Arum. The popularity of Cirebon Express continued to increase, and on 20 November 1989 the service operated eight coaches, including two equipped with air conditioning serving executive class passengers.

Following the completion of the elevated line between Jakarta Kota and Manggarai on 1 June 1992, the Gunungjati train was discontinued. To serve the remaining passenger demand, a new Cirebon Express departure from Cirebon at 12.20 local time was added.

On 13 May 2005, KAI introduced a new service as a derivative of the Cirebon Express train called Cirebon Expres Utama, which operated as an executive class service. This service only lasted for about two years, as it was replaced by the Argo Jati on 12 April 2007.

In 2007, KAI extended several Cirebon Express trips to Brebes. On 1 May 2007, the extended service was officially named Brebes Express.

On 18 October 2016, the Cirebon Express converted its business class service to economy plus, using 2016-built train sets manufactured by Industri Kereta Api (INKA).

=== Argo Jati (executive class, 2007-2019) ===
Before the Argo Jati was launched on 12 April 2007, there were three train services operating between Jakarta and Cirebon: the Gunung Jati (diesel train) (1973–1992), the Cirebon Express (1989–2019), and the Cirebon Express Utama (2005–2007). The launch of the "Argo" train on this route was planned due to customer demand and declining interest in the Cirebon Express Utama train service. This train operated with former Argo Gede trainsets from 1995.

=== Relaunching ===
The relaunch of the Argo Jati service took place on 3 November 2010 under the name New Argo Jati as a replacement for the previous operation. Interest in executive class rail services continued to grow, which encouraged KAI to improve the executive class Argo service on the Gambir–Cirebon route.

The train has operated at various times using executive class coaches built by INKA in 2010, while the 1995-built executive coaches were reassigned for use on the Cirebon Express and the Argo Jati services. The service has also operated with stainless steel coaches manufactured by INKA in 2018, while the earlier 2010-built Argo Jati coaches were transferred to the Ranggajati service.

=== Tegal Bahari train (2007-2019) ===
The Tegal Bahari is a spin-off service from the Cirebon Express group following the extension of certain services to Tegal in 2007. Its launch also introduced a dining car featuring a Tegal batik interior theme. The train initially operated with executive and business class coaches. In 2016, the service was upgraded to feature executive and economy coaches with the new image design.

=== Argo Cheribon (2019-31 January 2025) ===
The Argo Cheribon began operating on 16 August 2019 as a merger of three services: the Argo Jati, the Cirebon Express, and the Tegal Bahari. However, starting 22 March 2022, the Tegal Bahari service resumed operations on the Pasar Senen–Tegal round-trip route.

Since 3 November 2024, Argo Cheribon trains with numbers 29 and 30 have used the latest generation of economy class coaches. These coaches were modified by the Manggarai Yasa Center from previous economy sets, with seating reduced from 80 to 72 to provide more passenger space. The Ranggajati service began using the same type of modified coaches on 1 November 2024.

=== Operational of the Cirebon Facultative (2025-present) ===
Starting 1 February 2025, the Argo Cheribon branding will be removed under the 2025 train travel chart and replaced with the Cirebon service, which will operate as a facultative train. The Cirebon service will be divided into two routes: the Gunungjati train operating Semarang Tawang–Cirebon–Gambir, and the Cakrabuana train operating Purwokerto–Cirebon–Jakarta.

=== Gunungjati and Cakrabuana train ===
The Gunungjati service is a spin-off of the Argo Cheribon Tegal route following the extension of certain services to Tegal from 2007 until 2025. The original Gunungjati train had previously operated from 1973 until its discontinuation in 1992. After 32 years out of service, the train name returned in 2025 with a route extending to Semarang Tawang Station.

The Cakrabuana service is also a spin-off of the Argo Cheribon route, created when the line was extended to Purwokerto Station.

== Station ==
Cirebon Facultative serves the Cirebon–Jakarta corridor and stops at the following stations:

- Cirebon (start/end)
- Jatibarang
- Bekasi
- Jatinegara
- Gambir (Start/End)

== See also ==
- Gunungjati train
- Cakrabuana train
