= Argo Jati =

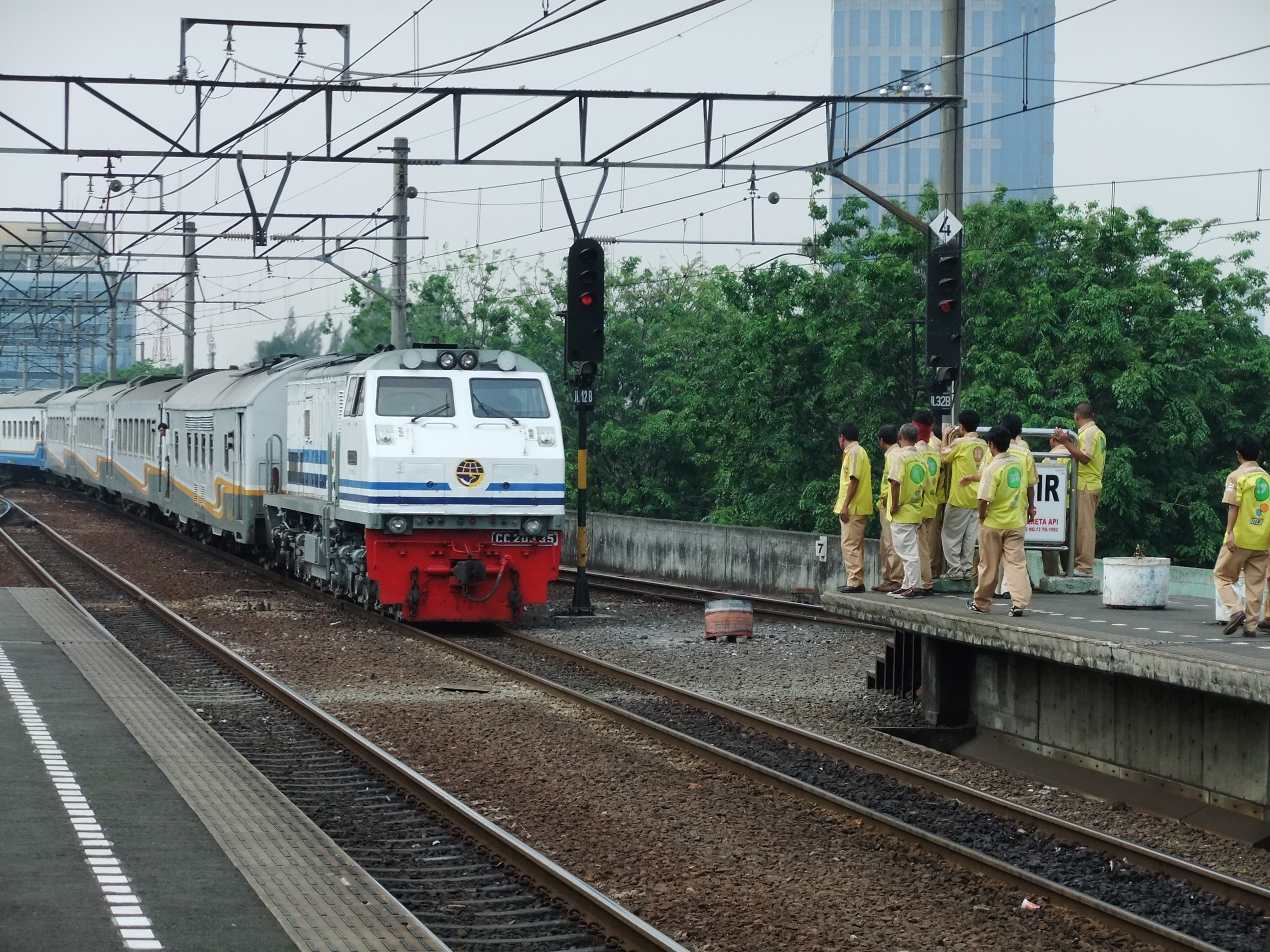
- Porters waiting to get inside the train

Overview
- Service type: Inter-city rail
- Status: Terminated / Discontinued
- Locale: West Java, Indonesia
- First service: 22 November 2007; 18 years ago
- Last service: 16 August 2019; 6 years ago (merged with Cirebon Express and Tegal Bahari as Argo Cheribon)
- Current operator: Kereta Api Indonesia
- Website: www.kereta-api.co.id

Route
- Termini: Gambir; Cirebon
- Stops: 5
- Distance travelled: 219 kilometres (136 mi)
- Average journey time: 3 hours, 10 minutes
- Service frequency: Twice a day each way

On-board services
- Class: Executive Class Only
- Seating arrangements: Bus Style
- Catering facilities: Onboard café
- Observation facilities: Large windows in all carriages; open-air carriage in middle of train
- Baggage facilities: Overhead racks; Bagasi Cargo

Technical
- Rolling stock: One GE U20C, GE U18C locomotive; Six Executive carriages(K1); One Bagasi "Cargo" carriage(B); One dining carriage(M1); One generator carriage(P)
- Track gauge: 1,067 mm (3 ft 6 in)
- Operating speed: 80–120 km/h (50–75 mph)

The Argo Jati was a train service operated by Kereta Api Indonesia (PT Kereta Api Indonesia) between Jakarta and Cirebon in Java, Indonesia. This train was relaunched on November 3, 2010, as a replacement train series of Argo Jati, which was launched in 2007.

== History ==
=== Launching of operation (2007-2010) ===
The launch of Argo for this line had been discussed, given the demand and the decline in the prestige argo class of Cirebon Express, which was inaugurated on May 13, 2005. Argo Jati was launched on April 12, 2007, as an improvised/improved service of the Cirebon Express train. The train 1995 series of executive trains previously used by the Argo Gede train. The name Argo, as stated in PT KAI's service class, is a brand image of executive class service, and Jati has taken from a Walisongo figure who succeeded in spreading Islam in Java, Sunan Gunung Jati.

=== Relaunch (2010-present) ===
The enthusiasm of the people of Cirebon and surrounding areas for executive-class train services is increasing, so PT KAI seeks to improve the services of the executive class with the direction of Gambir station and Cirebon station. The relaunch of the Argo Jati train with the name "New Argo Jati" was then held on November 3, 2010, as a replacement for the old Argo Jati train service. At present, the CC206 locomotive officially replaces CC 203 35, while the CC 203 35 is used as one of the mainstay locomotives of the Krakatau Ekspres train.

== Train formation and facilities ==
There is a diverse set of trains destined for Argo Jati :

Kereta Eksekutif	One "Cargo"/New Livery Baggage (B), 3 Executive Carriages (K1) made in 2015, one Dining car (M1) made in 2015, 3 Executive Carriages (K1) made in 2015, one generator carriage
Kereta Eksekutif Fakultatif	one generator carriage, 4 Executive Carriages(K1), one dining car(KM1/M1), 3 Executive Carriages (K1).

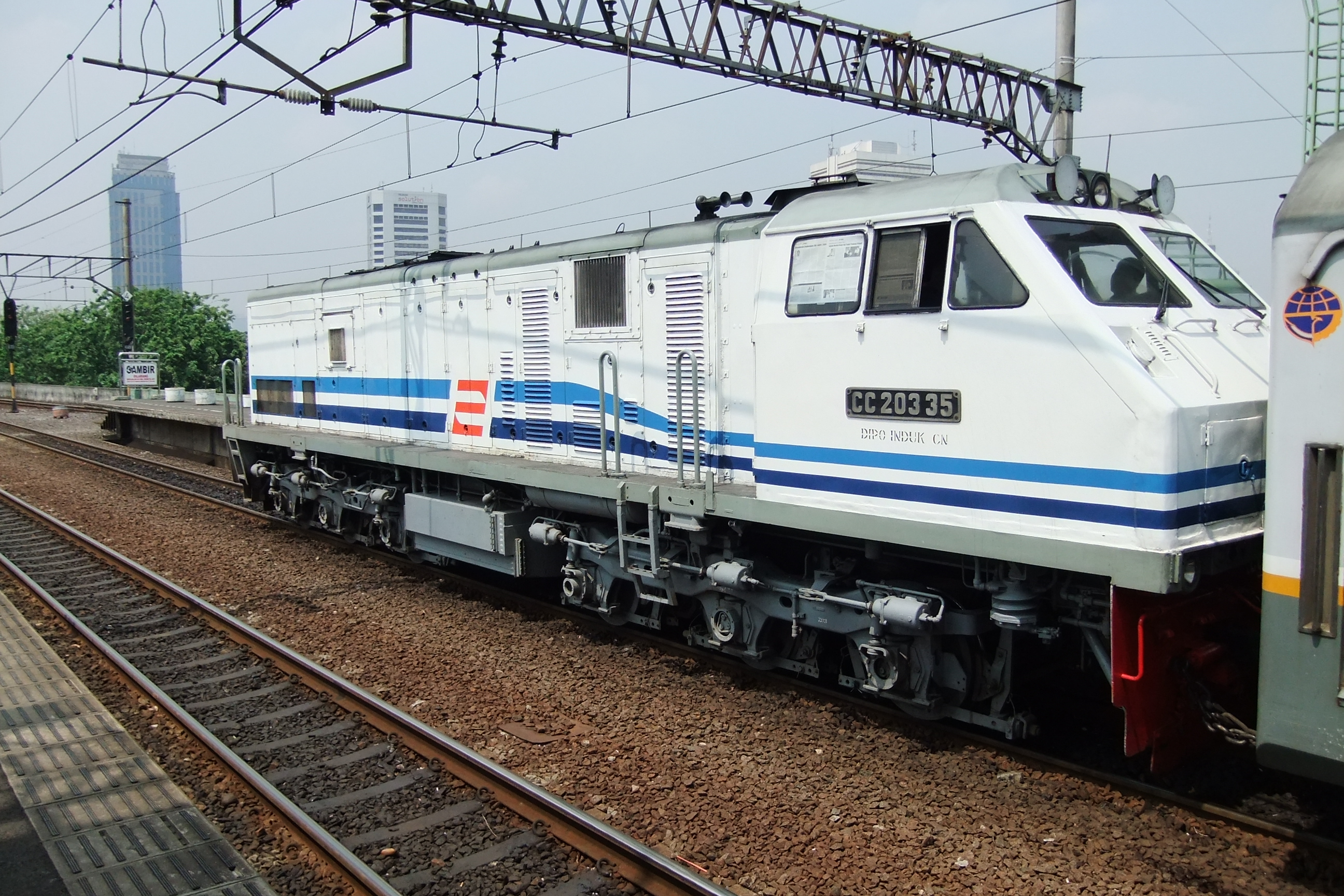
CC 203 35, the Argo Jati's star locomotive.

After it was announced that the Argo Jati train would use 2010 K1 executive coaches. since 2010 Argo Jati train had been using a new set of executive coaches. Starting 29 October 2018, the train has been using the stainless steel train Series made in 2018. Each train coach is equipped with a manual information digitally train sequence. There is also a running text , which can determine the speed of trains, stations and time signature. Equipped with TV, air conditioner, an outlet, a secure luggage, and toilet. Seats are reclining with each seat has luggage space, power charging point and reading light above, with curtain at the window side. Free Wi-Fi available at dining coach.

== Route, Schedule and Fare ==
Argo Jati train departs from the Cirebon Station and only stop at Jatibarang Station, Bekasi Station, Jatinegara Station and end the journey at Gambir Station. The train runs twice daily in each direction on the route Cirebon–Jatibarang–Bekasi–Jatinegara–Gambir, with an additional facultative train on special occasions. Train fare is Rp. 140,000 - 185,000, depending on the distance, class and seating position in the train carriage, as well as certain days, such as weekends and public holidays.

== See also ==
- PT Kereta Api
- Rail transport in Indonesia
- List of named passenger trains of Indonesia
