= Cakrabuana =

Passenger train Jakarta - Cirebon - Purwokerto service in Indonesia

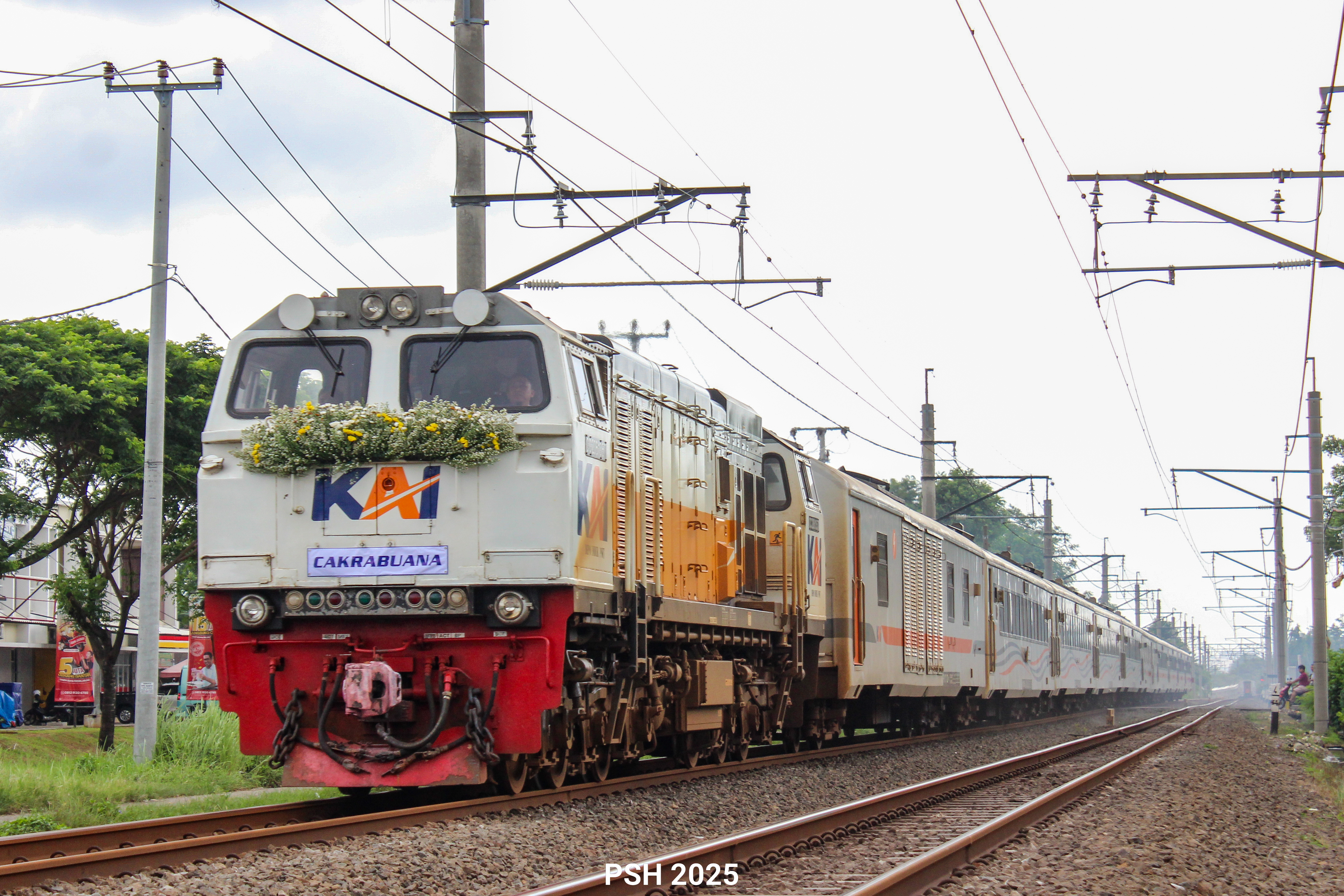
- Cakrabuana train heading to the east, 2025

Overview
- Service type: Inter-city rail
- Status: Operational
- Locale: Operational Area III Cirebon
- Predecessor: Argo Cheribon (2019–2025)
- First service: 1 February 2025
- Current operator: Kereta Api Indonesia

Route
- Termini: Gambir: Cirebon (for 122 and 123); Purwokerto (for 121 and 124)
- Distance travelled: 345 kilometres (214 miles)
- Average journey time: 2 hours 57 minutes (Gambir–Cirebon); 4 hours 57 minutes (Gambir–Purwokerto)
- Service frequency: daily each way
- Train number: 121-124

On-board services
- Classes: economy and executive
- Seating arrangements: 50 seats arranged 2-2 (executive class); 80 seats arranged 2-2 (economy class)
- Catering facilities: On-board cafe and trolley service

Technical
- Rolling stock: CC206
- Track gauge: 1,067 mm
- Operating speed: 80–120 kilometres per hour (50–75 mph)
Route map

Cakrabuana is an passenger train with the executive and economy class that is operated by Kereta Api Indonesia which between Gambir and Cirebon (122 and 123), and Purwokerto (121–124).

This train also support for the Gunungjati for Jakarta Gambir-Cirebon route.

== Branding ==
There are two versions of the origin of the brand name Cakrabuana. The first version is that the name is taken from the name of Prince Cakrabuana who was the son of Prabu Siliwangi he founded the Sultanate of Cirebon together with Sunan Gunungjati and also built a Dusun in the Cirebon area. The other version is that the name comes from the name of Mount Cakrabuana which is located in Lemahsugih District, Majalengka Regency, West Java, about 59.2 km northeast of Cirebon.

== Operational ==
The launch of the Cakrabuana train was carried out on 1 February 2025 at Purwokerto by Acting Regent of Banyumas, Iwanuddin Iskandar, Director of Commerce of PT KAI (Persero) Hadis Surya Palapa and the Board of Directors of KAI Operation Area V Purwokerto. On the inaugural trip, this train set consisted of four executive cars, four economy class cars, one dining car, and one power train. This train departed from Purwokerto to Gambir in the morning, while the direction to Cirebon and vice versa was in the afternoon and evening, and the direction to Purwokerto departed at night.

== Station ==
Here's route of the Cakrabuana train:

- Purwokerto (start/end for 121 and 124)
- Bumiayu
- Ketanggungan
- Ciledug
- Cirebon (start/end for 122 and 123)
- Babakan
- Arjawinangun
- Jatibarang
- Haurgeulis
- Pegaden Baru
- Cikampek
- Bekasi
- Jatinegara
- Gambir (Start/End)

== See also ==
- Gunungjati (train)
