= Gunungjati =

Gunungjati may refer to:

- Gunungjati (train), Kereta Api Indonesia passenger train
- Sunan Gunungjati (1448–1568), Islamic saint
