= Gumarang =

Passenger train service between Jakarta Pasar Senen and Surabaya Pasarturi, Indonesia

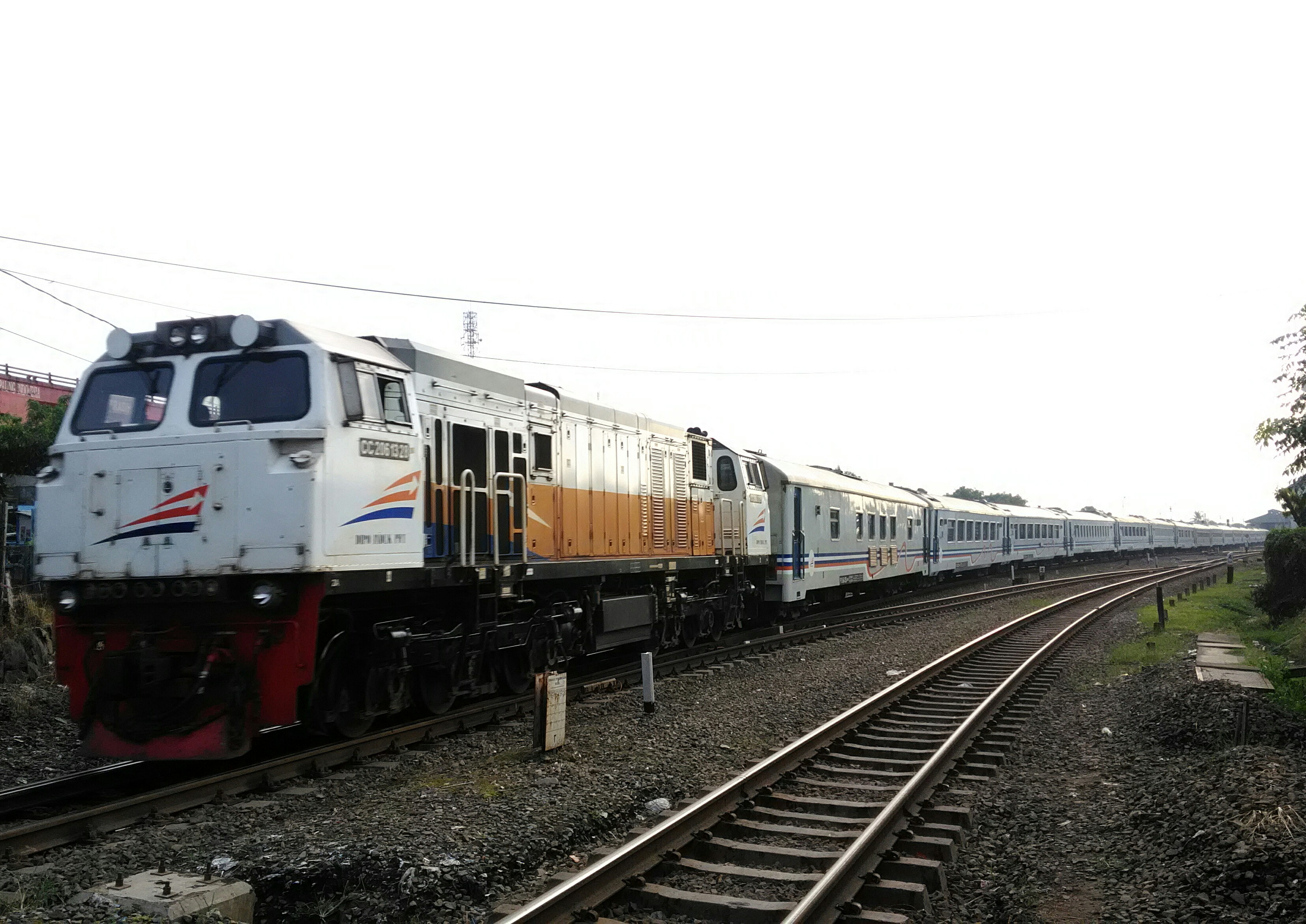
- Gumarang train rolling with CC206 an longer car, 2019

Overview
- Service type: Inter-city rail
- Status: Operational
- Predecessor: Jayabaya Utara (Northern Jayabaya) train
- First service: 20 May 2001
- Current operator: Kereta Api Indonesia

Route
- Termini: Pasar Senen; Surabaya Pasarturi
- Distance travelled: 719 km (446 mil)
- Average journey time: 10 hours 19 minutes
- Service frequency: 1x Daily each way
- Train number: 163-164

On-board services
- Classes: executive & economy
- Seating arrangements: 50 seats arranged 2-2 (executive class); 72 seats arranged 2-2 (economy class)
- Catering facilities: On-board cafe and trolley service

Technical
- Rolling stock: CC206
- Track gauge: 1.067 mm
- Operating speed: 70 - 100 km/h (43 - 62 mph)
Route map

Gumarang is an passenger train with 2 classes is executive & economy that operated by Kereta Api Indonesia which serving between Jakarta Pasar Senen & Surabaya Pasarturi via northern route of Java. This train offer 1x travel at night schedule around 719 km (446 mil) in 10 hours 19 minutes.

The Gumarang train start operated on 20 May 2001 for replacing the Jayabaya Utara (North Jayabaya) train which ceased in 2001.

== Mythology ==
One of the mythological creatures, the incarnation of a powerful person in the form of a Wild cow. Gumarang is a mythological creature originating from West Java culture.

This creature has a strong, sturdy, and agile body. According to an infographic released by Kereta Api Indonesia, the name Gumarang comes from West Javanese mythology, depicting a wild cow with gallant, agile, and strong characteristics. Gumarang is believed to be the incarnation of a powerful figure.

== History ==
=== Jayabaya Utara (North Jayabaya) (1980s - 2001) ===
The forerunner of the Gumarang train was the Jayabaya Utara (in English is Northern Jayabaya) train, which was a splinter of the Jayabaya train. The Jayabaya Utara train was launched in the 1960s with the Jakarta–Surabaya Pasarturi service and a business train. The original Jayabaya train was later renamed the Jayabaya Selatan (Southern Jayabaya) train when the splinter train began operating in the 1980s.

=== Introduction Operating (2001 - 2018) ===
The North Jayabaya train was no longer, and ceased operations in the early 2000s due to low occupancy. Then, in 2001, the Gumarang train was launched, starting operations on 20 May 2001, with a route from Jakarta Kota Station to Surabaya Pasarturi Station via Gambir Station, replacing the North Jayabaya. Meanwhile, the South Jayabaya train remained in operation until it ceased operations in 2007 due to low occupancy.

Since its inception, the Gumarang train served executive and business class passengers with afternoon departures.

=== Gumarang train (2019 - Present) ===
Along with the development, the Gumarang train was diverted to Pasar Senen to present. Because the Jakarta Kota Train Depot (JAKK) received additional train sets from other train depots, this train operates in a long series together with the Jayakarta train, Kertajaya, and Tawang Jaya train starting in 2018 and with the Tegal Bahari train starting in 2023.

As of mid-November 2019 before the following the enactment of new train travel chart 2019 (Gapeka 2019), the Gumarang train (along with the Sembrani) was taken over by operational ownership to Operational Area VIII Surabaya from Operational Area I Jakarta along with the train set being transferred to the Surabaya Pasarturi Train Depot (SBI), which was caused by two new trains that would arrive at Gapeka 2019, namely Dharmawangsa train (PSE-SBI) and Anjasmoro train (PSE-JG) as well as the extension of three train services from Operational Area II Bandung, namely Argo Wilis (GMR-BD-SGU), Mutiara Selatan (GMR-BD-ML) and Malabar train (ML-BD-PSE) as of 1 December 2019.

On 1 June 2023 following the enactment of new train travel chart 2023, The Gumarang train will exchange trains with the Tegal Bahari train, which is due to the train having a U-turn. After completing the Tegal Bahari train service, the long train will take a short break at Pasar Senen Station to avoid going back to the Cipinang Train Depot and will immediately turn around and head towards Surabaya Pasarturi Station in the evening.

On 15 July 2025, the Gumarang & Tegal Bahari train officially ended for the business train service of all regular trains on Java Island, and replaced it with the new generation of economy trains made of stainless steel produced by PT INKA in Madiun.

== List of the Station ==
On 1 February 2025 following the enactment of new train travel chart 2025, the Gumarang was changed schedule an arrival & departure from the station which before use the new generation stainless steel with the Tegal Bahari train.

- Pasarsenen (Start/End)
- Bekasi
- Karawang (only heading to Surabaya)
- Jatibarang
- Cirebon
- Tegal
- Pekalongan
- Pekalongan
- Semarang Tawang Bank Jateng
- Ngrombo
- Cepu
- Bojonegoro
- Babat
- Lamongan
- Surabaya Pasarturi (Start/End)

== Accident & Incident ==
- On 12 August 2007, the Gumarang train derailment at Gubug Station and Tegowanu Station, Grobogan, Central Java caused by sabotage of the rails cut by thieves. There were no fatalities in this incident, but two trains in one train derailed and three people were injured.
- On 16 June 2013, the Gumarang train return derailed at Batang Station which resulted in all Pantura trains experiencing delays.

== See also ==
- Taksaka
- Sancaka
- Turangga
- Sembrani
- Lodaya
- Kereta Api Indonesia
- Gumarang (Wild Cow)
