= Fajar and Senja Utama Yogya =

2 passenger train with the executive, premium economy, & priority class

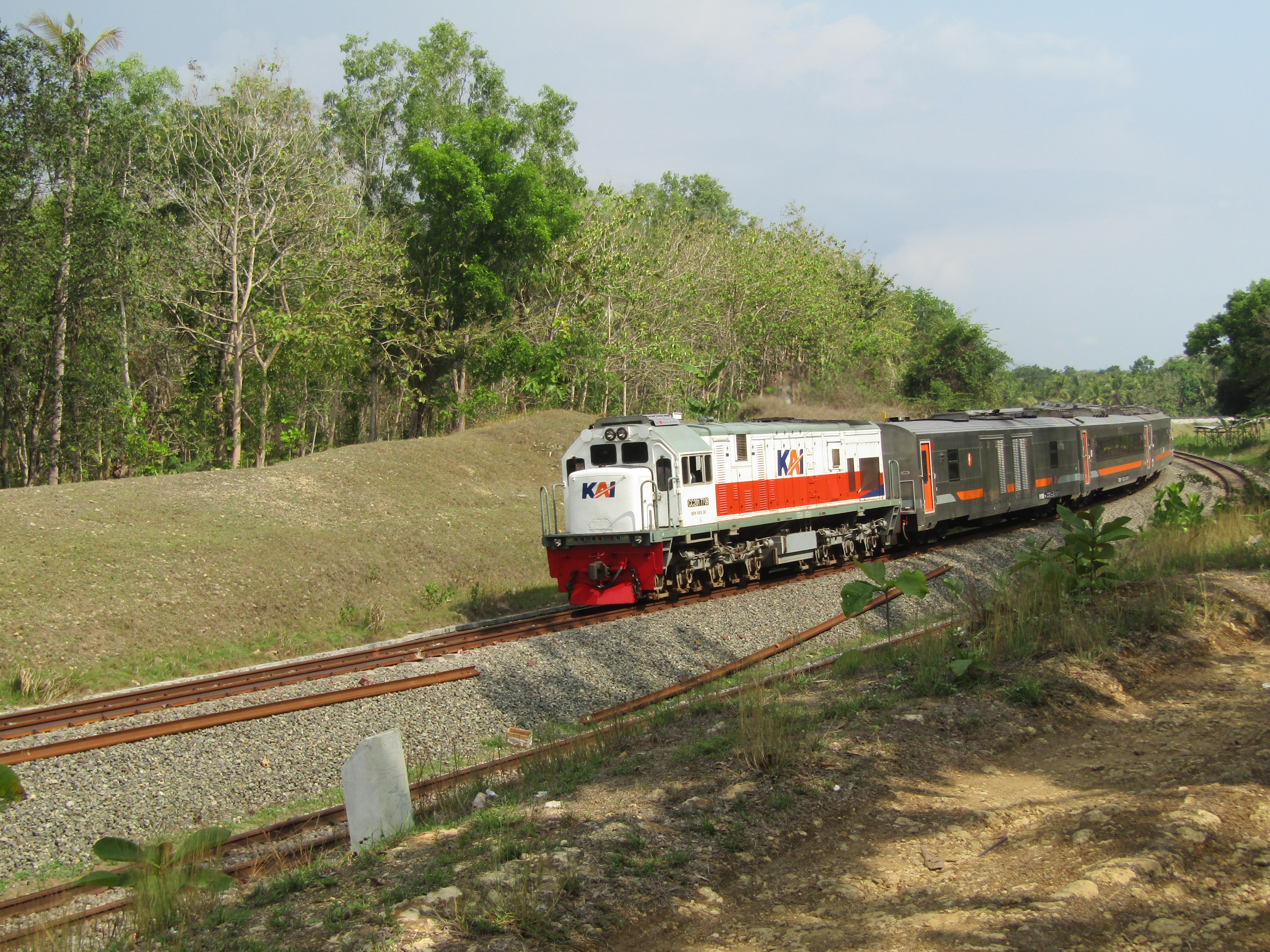
- Fajar Utama Yogya train as it turns around the Sukoreno Bend, Sentolo, Kulon Progo, 2024

Overview
- Service type: Inter-city rail
- Status: Operational
- First service: 12 May 1986
- Current operator: Kereta Api Indonesia

Route
- Termini: Pasar Senen; Yogyakarta
- Distance travelled: 510 km (316 mil)
- Average journey time: 7 hours 27 minutes (Fajar Utama Yogyakarta); 7 hours (Senja Utama Yogyakarta)
- Service frequency: Daily each way
- Train numbers: 107-108 (Senja Utama Yogyakarta); 109-110 (Fajar Utama Yogyakarta)

On-board services
- Classes: executive, premium economy, & priority
- Seating arrangements: 50 seats arranged 2-2 (executive class); 80 seats arranged 2-2 (premium economy class); 28 seats arranged 2-2 (priority class)

Technical
- Rolling stock: CC206; CC203; CC201
- Track gauge: 1067 mm
- Operating speed: 70 km/h (50 mph) to 110 km/h (75 mph)
Route map

Fajar and Senja Utama Yogya (also known as Fajar and Senja Utama Yogyakarta, Fajar and Senja Utama YK, or in English the Main Dawn and Dusk of Yogya) are two passenger trains with executive, premium economy, and priority classes operated by Kereta Api Indonesia between Pasar Senen and Yogyakarta via Purwokerto.

These trains have one trip daily each way. Fajar Utama Yogya runs in the morning, while Senja Utama Yogya runs during the evening or night over the same route.

== History ==
On 12 May 1986, PT KAI launched Fajar Utama Yogya. The Senja Utama Yogya train also launched.

On 12 May 2019, the trains were replaced stainless steel trains made by PT INKA with executive and premium economy services.

== Station list ==
As of Gapeka 2025.

=== Fajar Utama Yogyakarta ===
Stations:

- Pasar Senen (Start/End)
- Jatinegara (only bound from Yogyakarta)
- Bekasi
- Karawang (only bound to Yogyakarta)
- Cikampek (only bound to Yogyakarta)
- Haurgeulis
- Terisi
- Jatibarang
- Cirebon
- Ciledug
- Bumiayu
- Purwokerto
- Kroya
- Gombong
- Kebumen
- Kutoarjo
- Wates
- Yogyakarta (Start/End)

=== Senja Utama Yogya ===
Stations:

- Pasar Senen (Start/End)
- Jatinegara (only bound from Yogyakarta)
- Bekasi
- Karawang
- Jatibarang
- Cirebon
- Bumiayu
- Purwokerto
- Kroya
- Gombong
- Kebumen
- Kutoarjo
- Wates
- Yogyakarta (Start/End)

== Incident ==
- On 13 November 2015, the Senja Utama Yogya train collided with a water truck while crossing at KM 29.5 of the Bekasi–Tambun section, severely damaging the CC201 83 26 (CC201 64) locomotive. There were no fatalities in this incident.

== See also ==
- Taksaka
- Fajar and Senja Utama Solo
