= Tegal Bahari =

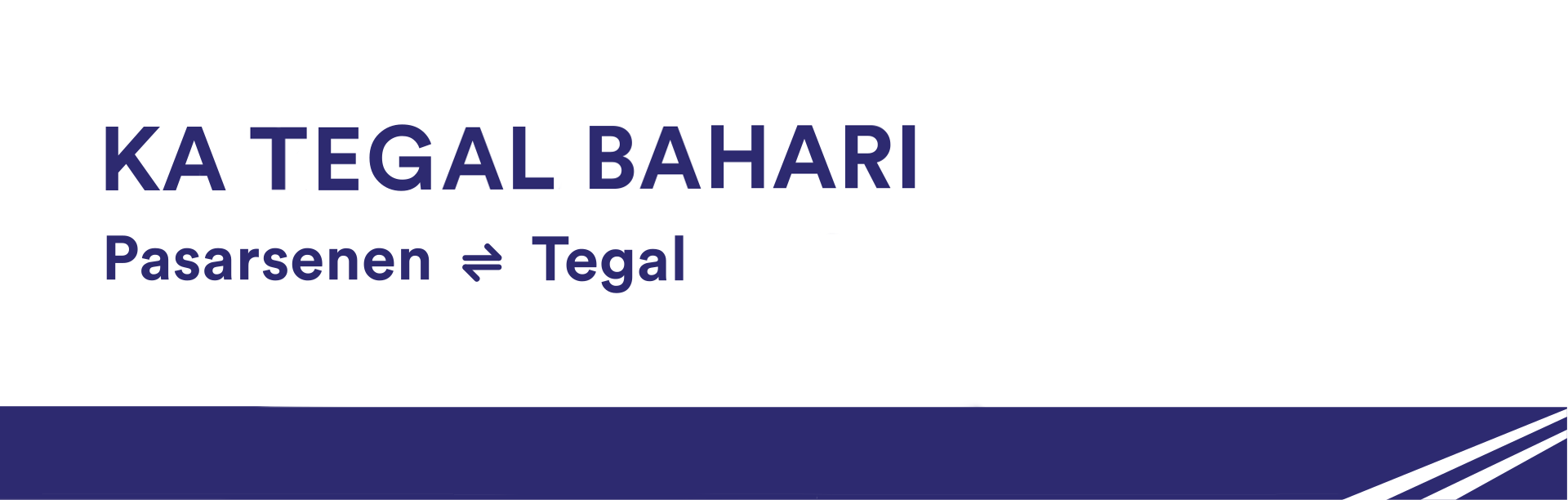

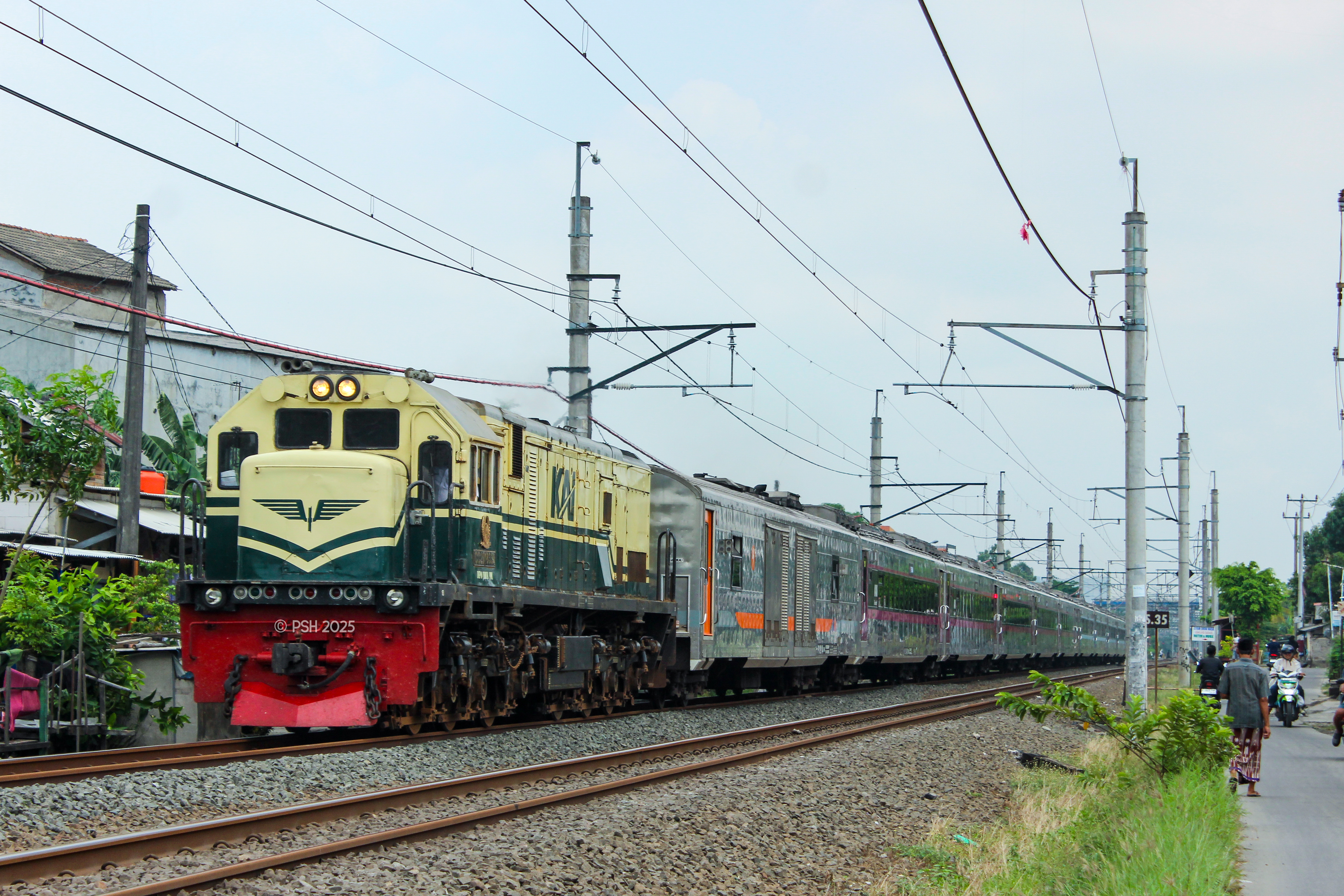
- 204 Tegal Bahari passing at Tambun with Vintage of CC201 Locomotive, 2025

Overview
- Service type: Inter-city rail
- Status: Operational
- Locale: Operational Area I Jakarta
- First service: 4 October 2014 (Tegal Bahari between Tegal-Gambir); 26 March 2022 (Tegal Bahari between Pasar Senen-Tegal)
- Current operator: Kereta Api Indonesia

Route
- Termini: Pasar Senen; Tegal
- Distance travelled: 289 kilometres (180 miles)
- Average journey time: 4 hours 27 minutes
- Service frequency: daily each way
- Train number: 203-204

On-board services
- Classes: economy and executive
- Seating arrangements: 50 seats arranged 2-2 (executive class); 72 seats arranged 2-2 (economy class)
- Catering facilities: On-board cafe and trolley service

Technical
- Rolling stock: CC206
- Track gauge: 1,067 mm
- Operating speed: 65–100 kilometres per hour (40–62 mph)
Route map
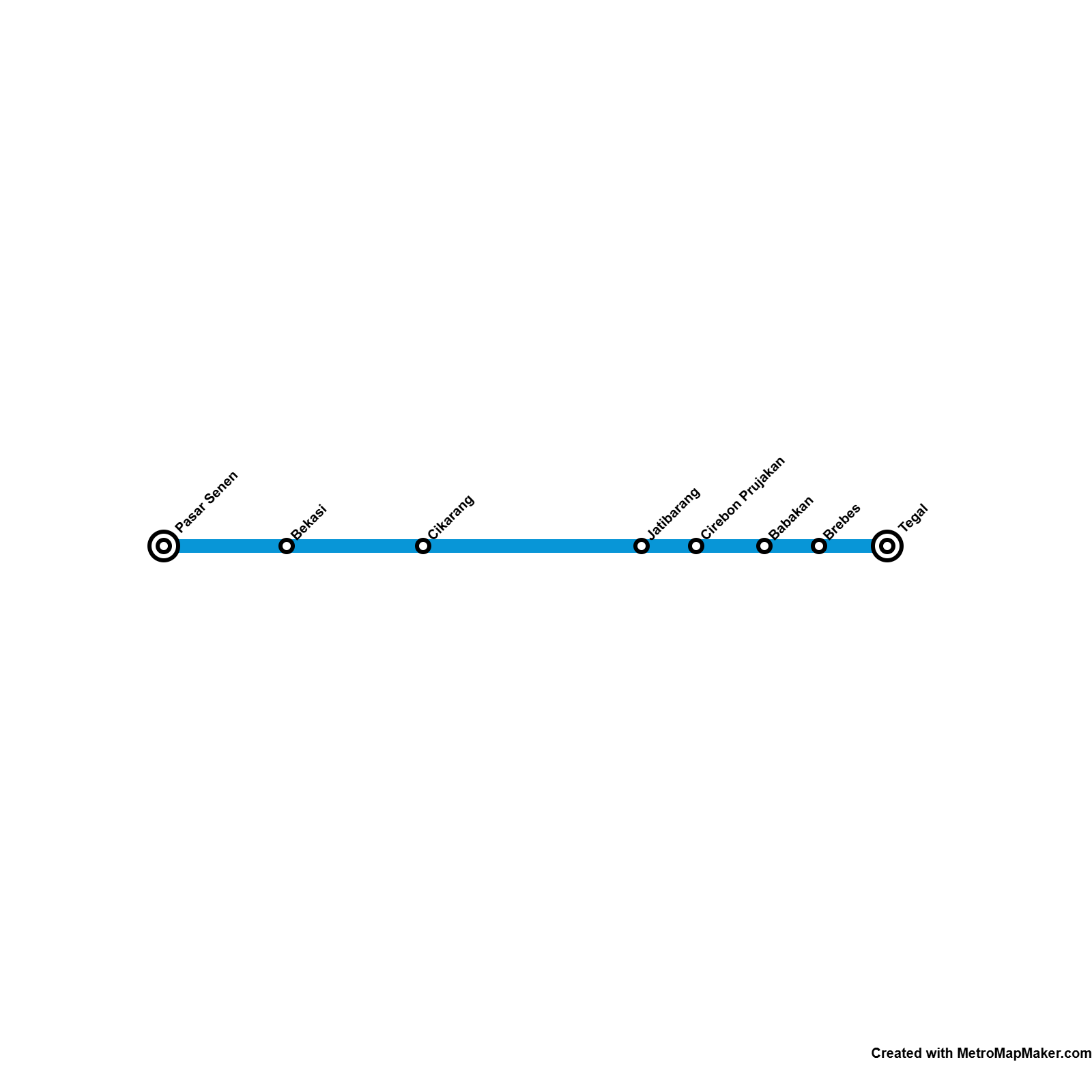

Tegal Bahari is an intercity passenger train operated by Kereta Api Indonesia (KAI) on the Pasar Senen–Tegal service in Central Java. The service connects Jakarta with Tegal through the northern Java corridor and serves as one of the main direct rail links between the two cities.

The name "Tegal Bahari" comes from the official city motto of Tegal, which combines the word "Tegal" with "Bahari", an acronym meaning Bersih (clean), Aman (safe), Hijau (green), Asri (pleasant), Rapi (neat), and Indah (beautiful).

== History ==
The Tegal Bahari service originates from the former Cirebon Express, which was extended to Tegal to form a new long-distance train between Pasar Senen and Tegal. The service was introduced on 4 October 2014, and at its launch the train was presented with a batik-themed dining car that reflected the cultural identity of Tegal.

In the early 2010s, rail services between Jakarta and Tegal were reorganized. In August 2012, Tegal Ekspres was launched to serve the corridor, first on the Tegal–Semarang Poncol route and later, from 1 August 2013, on the Tegal–Pasar Senen route as an additional service during the Eid travel period.

During the train travel chart 2017, KAI increased the frequency of Tegal Bahari services from four to six daily trips, making it one of the routes that received additional operational slots.

By 2025, Tegal Bahari was still operating on the Pasar Senen–Tegal corridor using business and executive class coaches, with a travel time of around four and a half hours depending on direction.

On 16 July 2025, KAI changed the train's rolling stock. The former executive and business configuration was replaced with a mixed executive and Economy New Generation stainless-steel trainset built by INKA. This change was part of KAI's fleet modernization program and applied at the same time as similar upgrades to other long-distance services.

== Station ==
Under the 2025–2026 timetable, Tegal Bahari serves the following stations between Jakarta Pasar Senen and Tegal:

- Pasarsenen (Start/End)
- Bekasi
- Cikarang
- Jatibarang
- Cirebon Prujakan
- Babakan
- Brebes
- Tegal (start/end)

== See also ==
- Gumarang
