= Cirebon railway station =

Railway station in Indonesia

Cirebon Station Stasiun Cirebon
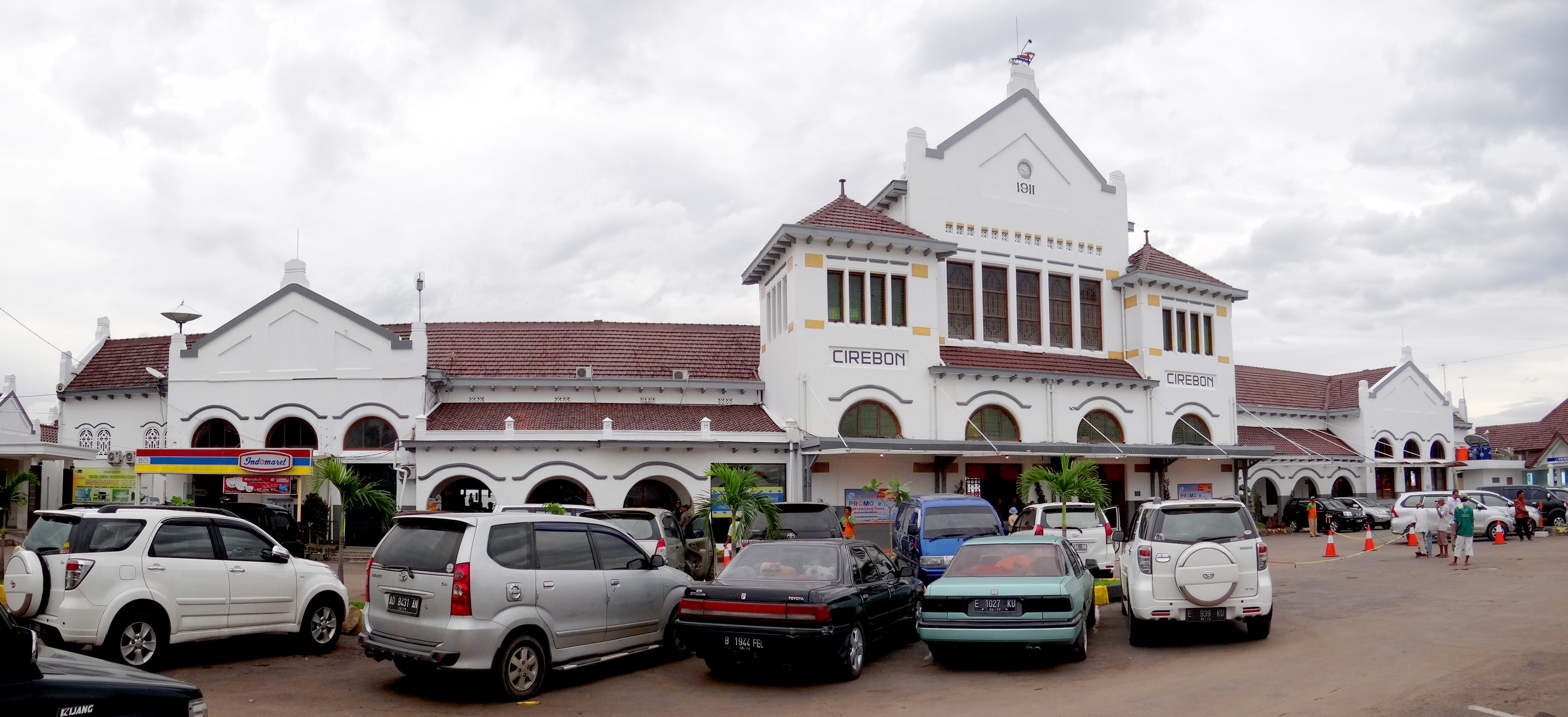
- Front view

General information
- Other names: Cirebon Kejaksan Station; Kejaksan Station
- Location: Siliwangi Street, Kebonbaru, Kejaksan, Cirebon; West Java; Indonesia
- Coordinates: 6°42′19″S 108°33′20″E
- Elevation: +4 m (13 ft)
- Owner: Kereta Api Indonesia
- Operator: Kereta Api Indonesia
- Lines: Cikampek–Cirebon Prujakan; ~~Cirebon–Kadipaten~~
- Platforms: 1 side platform 3 island platforms
- Tracks: 6

Construction
- Structure type: Ground
- Parking: Available
- Accessible: Available
- Architect: Pieter Adriaan Jacobus Moojen
- Architectural style: Art Nouveau; Art Deco; New Indies Style; Dutch Rationalist

Other information
- Station code: CN • 0930
- Classification: Large class type A

History
- Opened: 1912
- Former names: Cheribon Station (SS); Tjirebon Station
Location
- Location within Java

Cirebon Station (Indonesian: Stasiun Cirebon, Station Code: CN) also known as Cirebon Kejaksan Station is the main railway station in the Cirebon area located on Siliwangi Street, Kebonbaru, Kejaksan, Cirebon City, West Java Province. Most of the trains stopped at this station, except economy class train which is stop at Cirebon Prujakan.

As a transfer station, Cirebon Station is one-side station where the platform is located one side linearly with station building.

== History ==
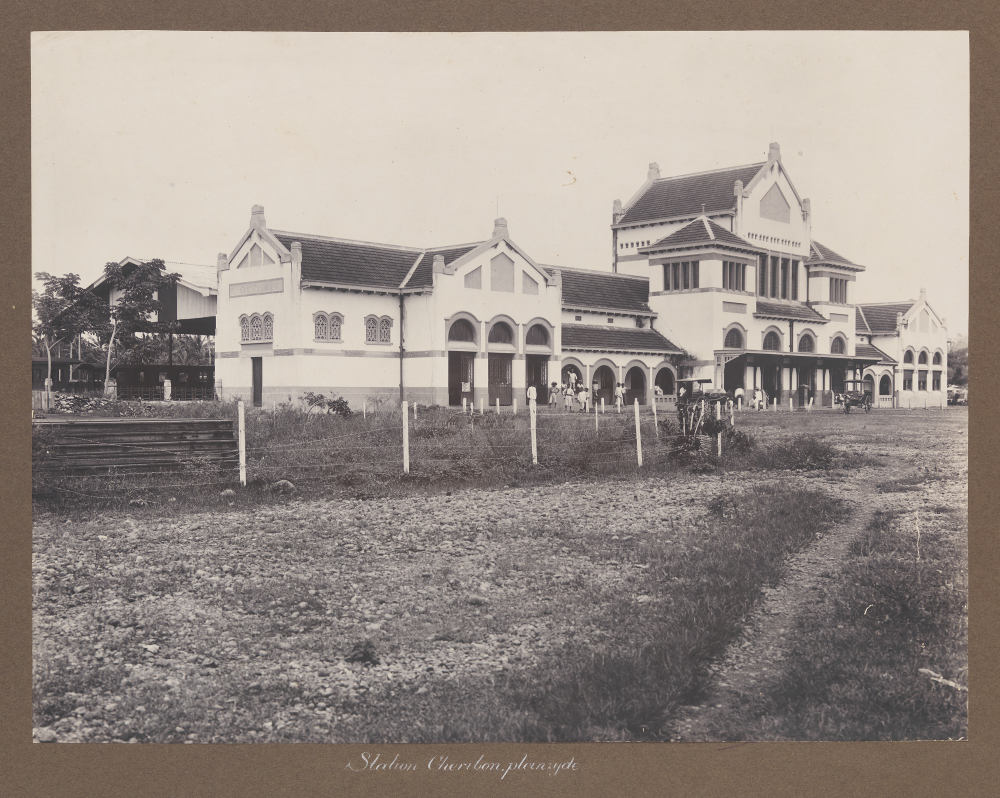
The front view of the station in the past

Staatsspoorwegen (SS) began to instill its influence in Cirebon since the late 1900's. The existing line in Cikampek was then extended to attract customers in Cirebon. On 3 June 1912, the Cikampek to Cirebon railroad was completed and was part of the construction of the railroad to Purwokerto and Kroya. The route to Cirebon is used to connect the SS line with the Semarang–Cheribon Stoomtram Maatschappij (SCS) line. On 1 November 1914, the two stations connected successfully.

The current building of Cirebon Station was the work of a Dutch architect Pieter Adriaan Jacobus Moojen. The architecture of the building follows the Dutch Rationalist conformed into the tropics, becoming a new vernacular style sometimes dubbed the New Indies Style. In 1984, this station was painted white.

In 2011, Cirebon and Cirebon Prujakan stations were renovated by elevating the platforms, increasing the number of lanes and the existing facilities.

== Building and layout ==
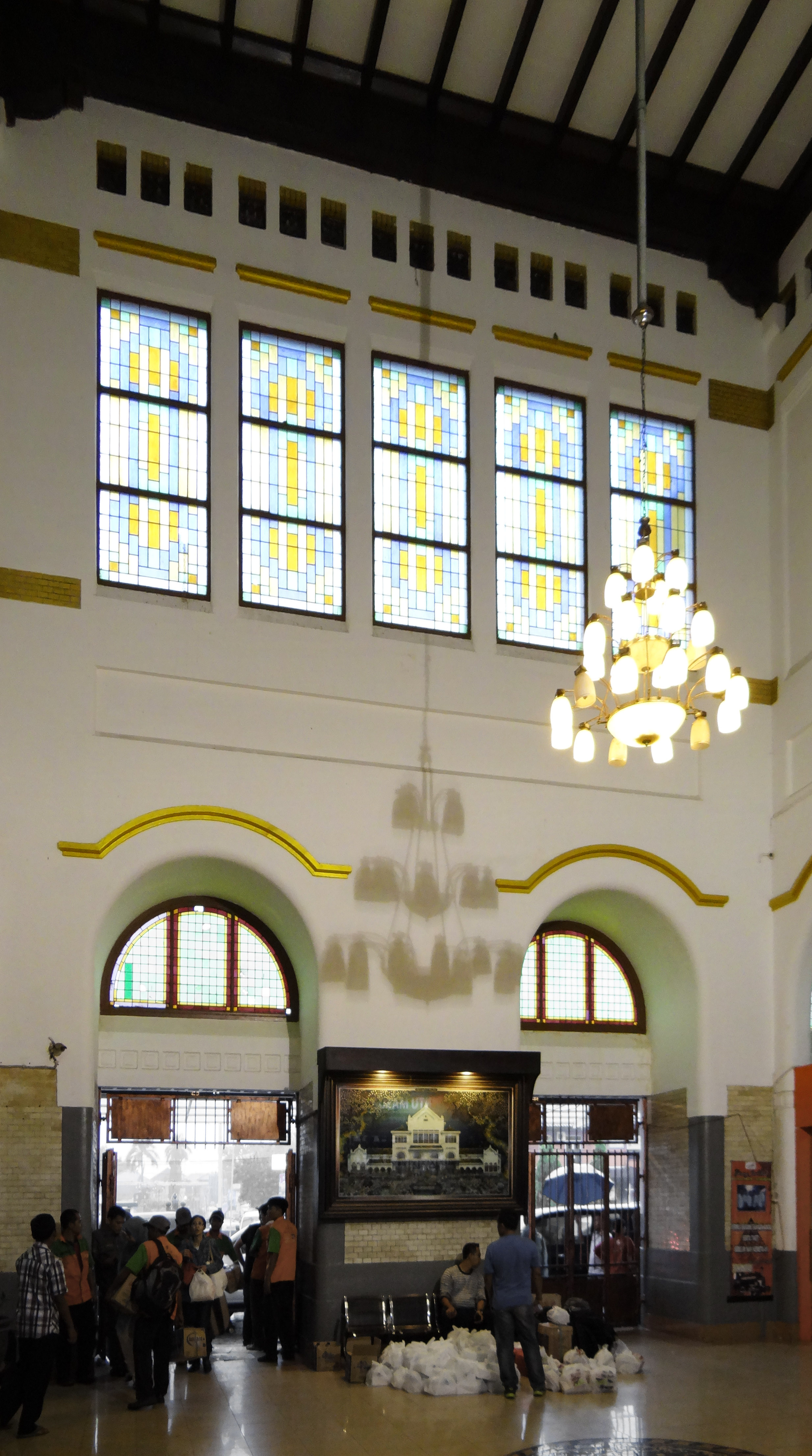
The interior of the main hall of Cirebon Kejaksan Station.

Cirebon Station has six tracks plus one line that is connected to the locomotive depot and train depot which are located on the northeast side of the station complex. Initially, line 2 was a straight line in the direction of Cikampek–Jakarta and in the direction of Tegal, while line 3 was a straight line branching from and towards Prupuk-Kroya. After the double track to Haurgeulis Station became operational in 2003, line 3 was also used as a double track straight line from Cikampek–Jakarta.

In 2011, the station was renovated by elevating the station platform and overhauling the layout of existing tracks and facilities. In addition, the branch for the route to Purwokerto–Kroya was moved to Cirebon Prujakan Station—the branch remains controlled at Cirebon Station. Line 2 is fully used as a straight rail for the direction of Cikampek-Jakarta, while line 3 is fully used as a straight rail for the direction of Tegal or Prupuk-Kroya. In addition, the rail track between the two stations is used as a double single track or twin tracks. The old electrical signaling system has been replaced with a new signaling produced by GRS.

To connect the lines at this station, an underground tunnel is provided so that passengers do not have to directly cross the railroad tracks to reach their intended track.

== Services ==
The following is a list of train services at the Cirebon Station

=== Passenger services ===
- Executive class
  - Anggrek & Sembrani to Gambir and Surabaya Pasar Turi
  - Argo Dwipangga to Gambir and Solo Balapan
  - Argo Lawu to Gambir and Solo Balapan
  - Argo Muria to Gambir and Semarang Tawang
  - Argo Sindoro to Gambir and Semarang Tawang
  - Brawijaya to Gambir and Malang
  - Bima & Argo Semeru to Gambir and Surabaya Gubeng
  - Gajayana to Gambir and Malang
  - Purwojaya to Gambir and Cilacap
  - Taksaka to Gambir and Yogyakarta
- Pandalungan to Gambir and Jember
- Argo Anjasmoro to Gambir and Surabaya Pasar Turi
- Executive and premium economy class
  - Ciremai to Bandung and Semarang Tawang
  - Gumarang to Pasar Senen and Surabaya Pasar Turi
  - Ranggajati from and to Jember via Yogyakarta - Surabaya Gubeng
- Executive and economy class
  - Cirebon train from and to Gambir
  - Harina to Bandung and Surabaya Pasar Turi
  - Sawunggalih to Pasar Senen and Kutoarjo
  - Singasari to Pasar Senen and Blitar
  - Fajar Utama Yogya to Pasar Senen and Yogyakarta
  - Senja Utama Yogya to Pasar Senen and Yogyakarta
  - Fajar and Senja Utama Solo to Pasar Senen and Solo Balapan
- Cakrabuana train to Gambir
- Gunungjati train to Gambir

== Incidents ==
- On 2 September 2001 at 03:45, The Empu Jaya train collided with the Cirebon Express train locomotive which was being shunting. As a result of this incident, dozens of passengers were killed and injured, and the northern cross-railway was disrupted and the railroad had to be diverted to the south-bound route.
- On 18 April 2009 at 20:45, part of the VIP waiting room at Cirebon Station caught fire. It was suspected that the fire started from the air conditioner in the room. Before the fire spread any further, station officials and firefighters put it out.

== Gallery ==
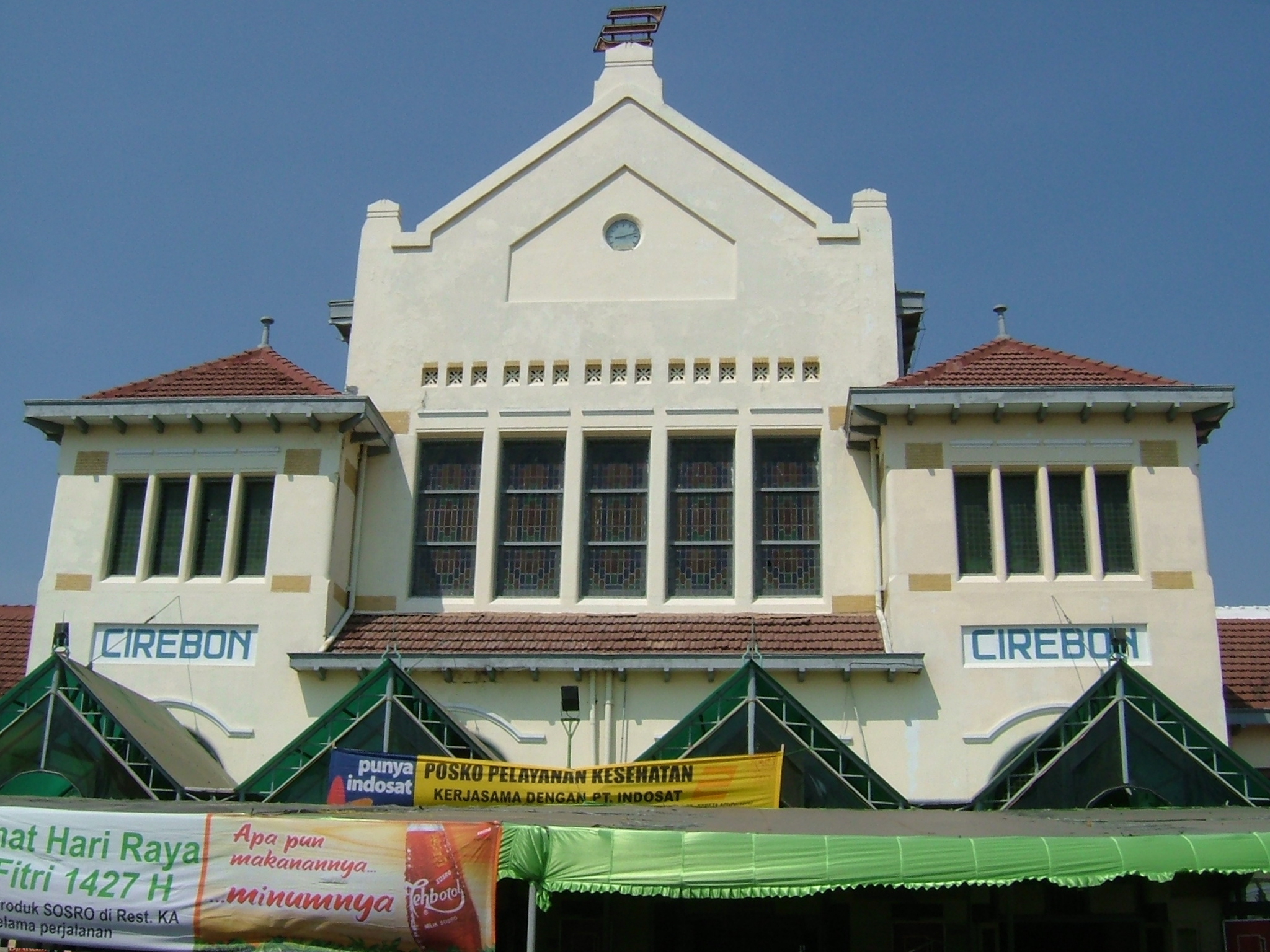
The front facade of the station (2006)

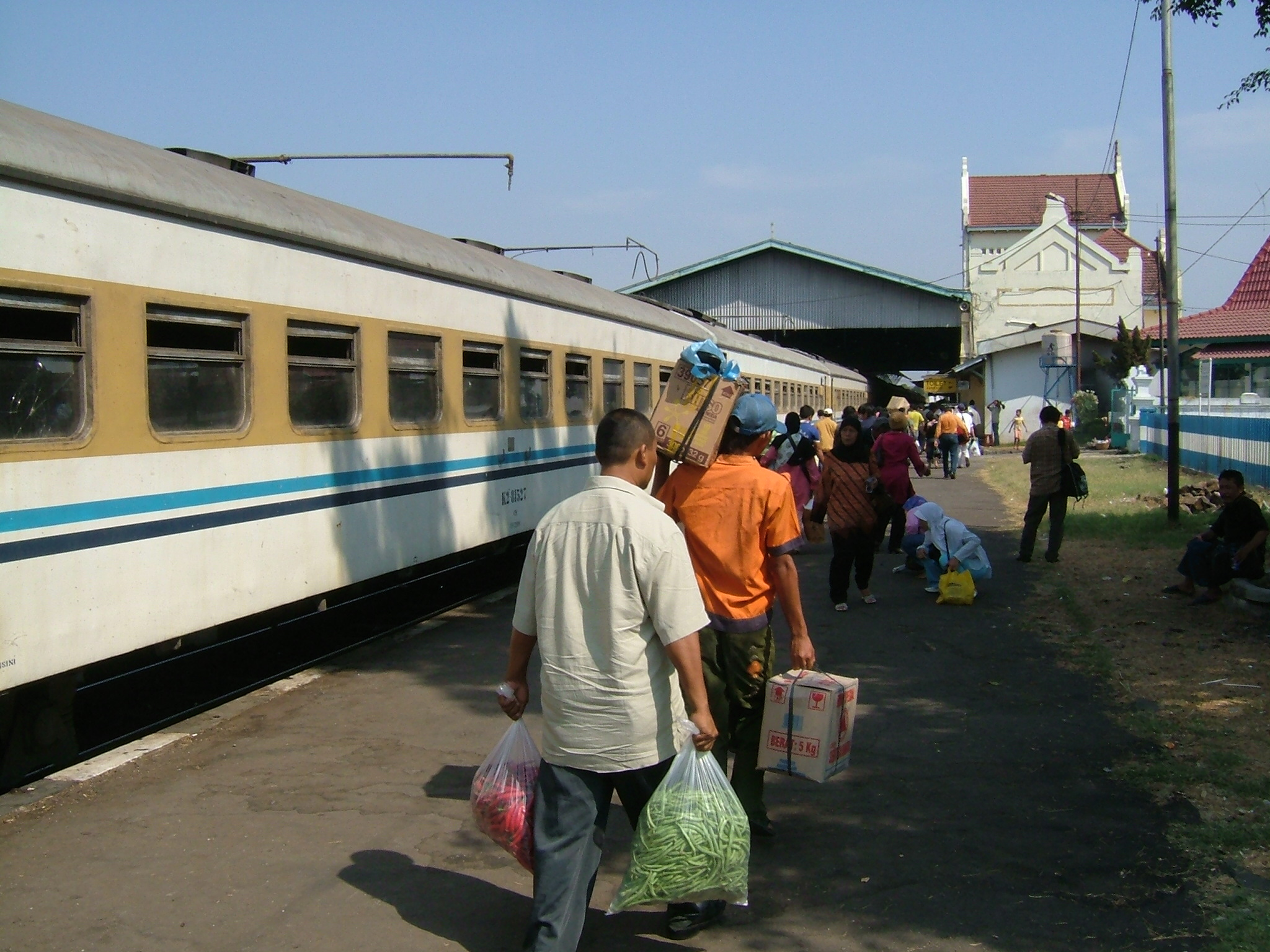
The station prior to renovation, with the Cirebon Express train passing through on the left (2006)

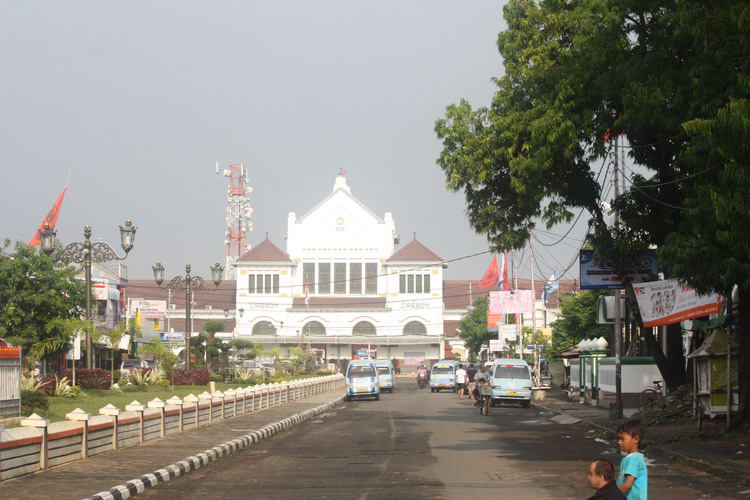
The Cirebon station seen from afar (2014)

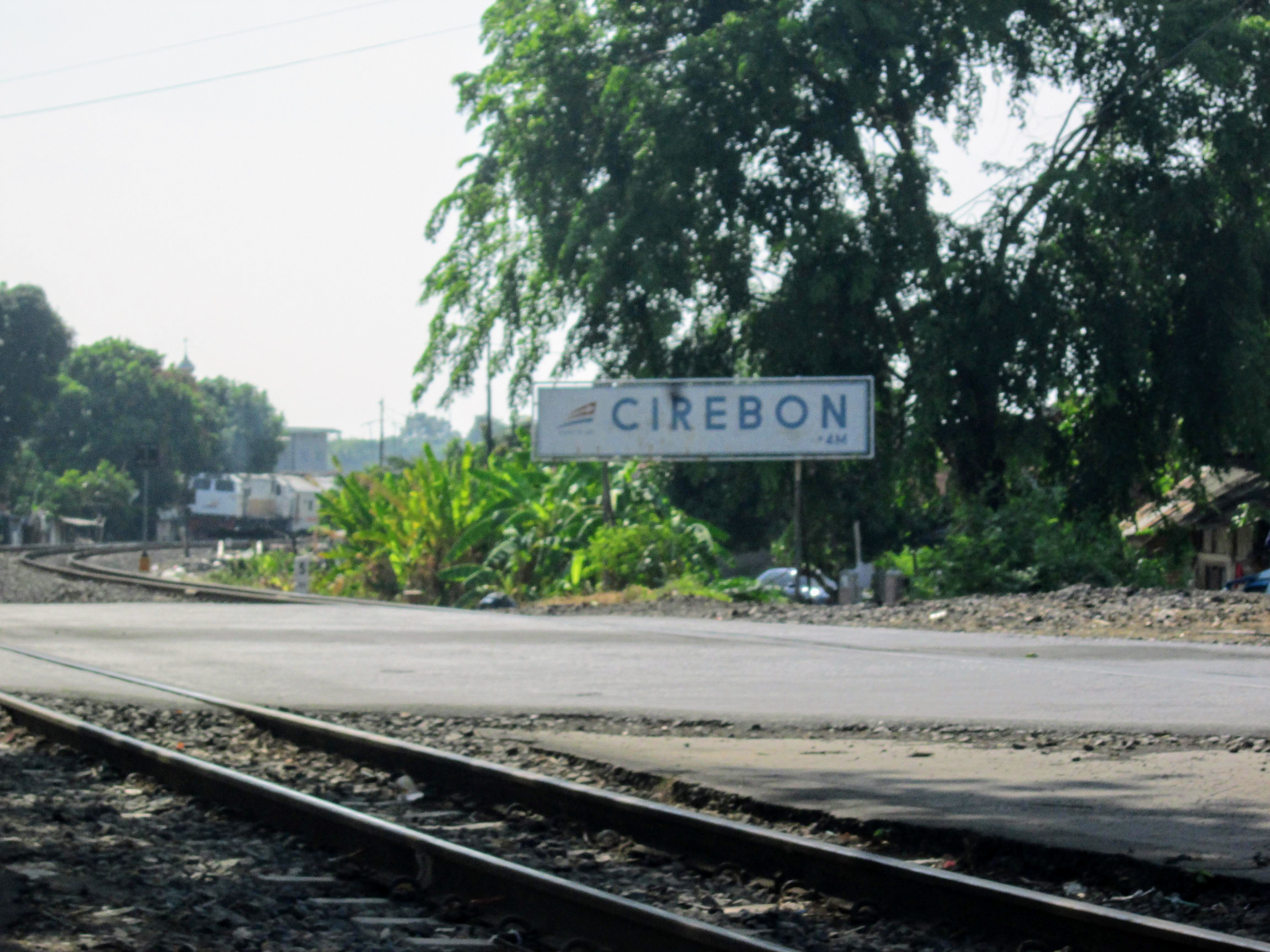
The old signage of the station seen from the Slamet Riyadi street (2019)

| Preceding station | Kereta Api Indonesia | Following station |
|---|---|---|
| Cangkring towards Cikampek | Cikampek–Cirebon Prujakan | Cirebon Prujakan; Terminus |
