= Gunungjati (train) =

Passenger train Jakarta - Cirebon - Semarang service in Indonesia

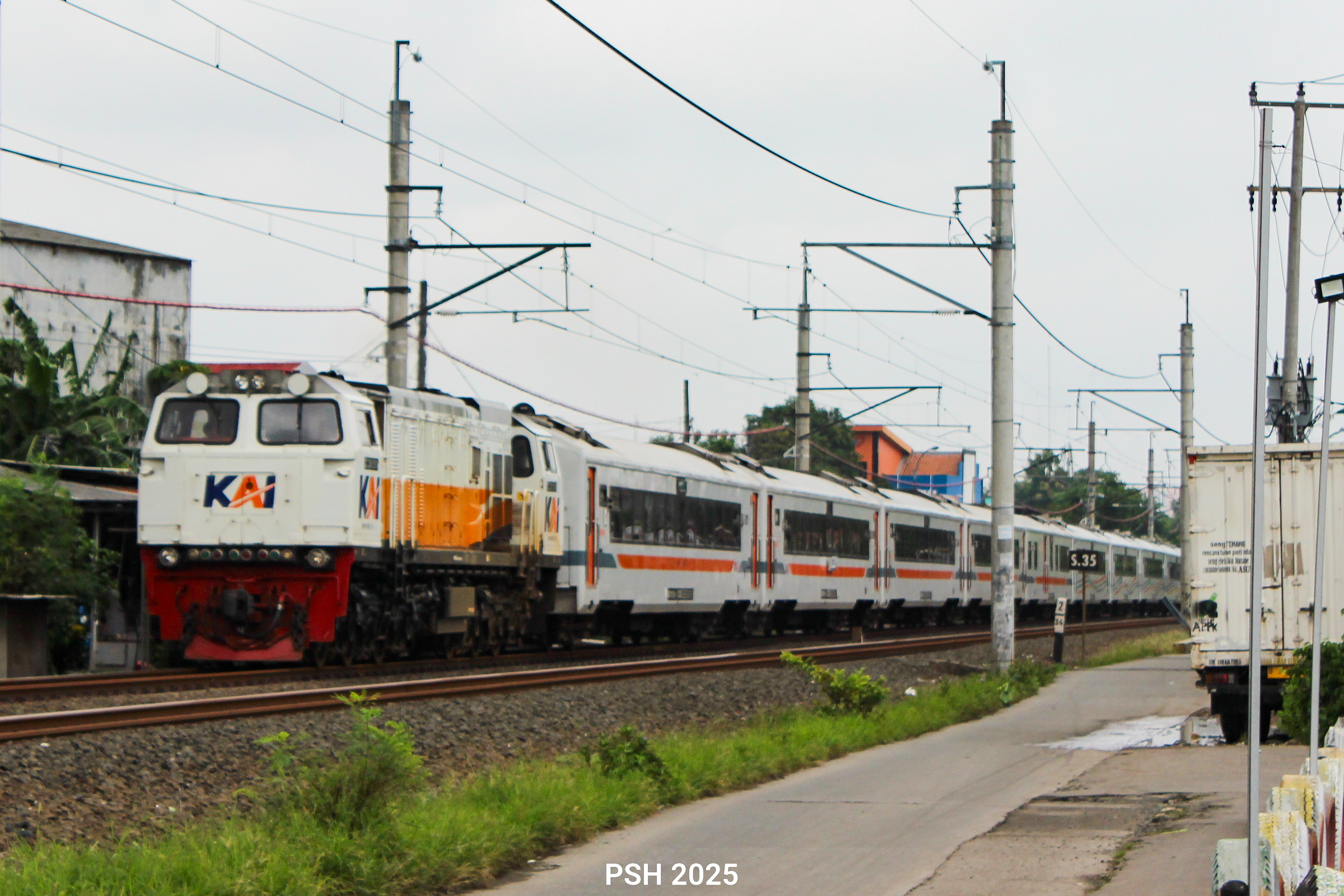
- Gunungjati train heading to the east, 2025

Overview
- Service type: Inter-city rail
- Status: Operational
- Locale: Operational Area III Cirebon
- First service: 1 February 1973
- Current operator: Kereta Api Indonesia

Route
- Termini: Gambir: Cirebon (for 117 and 120); Semarang Tawang (for 118 and 119)
- Distance travelled: 440 kilometres (270 miles)
- Average journey time: 2 hours 47 minutes (Gambir–Cirebon); 5 hours 46 minutes (Gambir–Semarang)
- Service frequency: daily each way
- Train number: 117-120

On-board services
- Classes: economy and executive
- Seating arrangements: 50 seats arranged 2-2 (executive class); 80 seats arranged 2-2 (economy class)
- Catering facilities: On-board cafe and trolley service

Technical
- Rolling stock: CC206
- Track gauge: 1,067 mm
- Operating speed: 80–120 kilometres per hour (50–75 mph)
Route map

Gunungjati is an passenger train with the executive and economy class that is operated by Kereta Api Indonesia which between Gambir and Cirebon (117 and 120), and Semarang Tawang (118-119) via northern Java railway line.

== Branding ==
The name of this train comes from the name of a figure Wali Songo from Cirebon, West Java, namely Sunan Gunungjati. Sunan Gunungjati was instrumental in spreading the teachings of Islamic religion in Regency and Cirebon City during his time, he built an Islamic boarding school located in Cirebon City. His services are also immortalized in the name of a sub-district, namely Gunungjati, Cirebon Regency.

== History ==
=== Jakarta–Cirebon (1973–1992) ===
Gunungjati train operated on 1 February 1973, and pulled by a hydraulic diesel locomotive BB301. This train is classified as an express train operated to continue the duties of the Patas Cirebon–Jatinegara train and was inaugurated jointly by the Minister of Transportation, Frans Seda, the Mayor of Cirebon, Tatang Suwardi, and the Head of Bappenas, Widjojo Nitisastro in commemoration of the 602nd anniversary of the City of Cirebon. At that time, this train operated twice a day and took 2.5 hours.

In his speech at the inauguration of the Gunungjati train, Nitisastro touched on the issue of fertilizer distribution. This was in response to issues related to the availability of goods: the goods are available, but the means of transportation aren't ready, or vice versa: there are many vehicles, but not a single item is being transported. This problem, he said, must be addressed through synergy between businesses in the trade and transportation sectors.

On 10 May 1984, PJKA announced that in the 1984 Gapeka released on that day, the Gunungjati train service pattern was changed, by launching the Tegal–Jakarta Kota pp Express, Cirebon–Jakarta Kota pp (via Pasar Senen), and presenting the Gunung Jati KRD based on MBW 302 diesel railway, with the Cirebon–Jakarta Kota pp route (via Gambir), with an average travel time of 3.5 hours.

A few years later, PJKA finally overhauled all Gunung Jati train services to 3rd class (economy) and ran through Pasar Senen, in connection with the start of operation of the Tegal Arum train. In fact, for this train to survive, this train had to be operated by exchanging support facilities. In contrast, the Cirebon Express actually rose in class, because on 20 November 1989, the Cirebon Express already had eight trains, two of which were equipped with air conditioning. On 1 June 1992, in connection with the switch-over of the Jakarta Kota–Manggarai elevated line, the Gunungjati train was removed in connection with the opening of the Cirebon Express which departs from Cirebon at 12.20, leaving the Tegal Arum train in operation.

=== Jakarta–Semarang (2025–present) ===
In 2025, PT KAI re-operate this train after 32 years of suspended animation (like the operation of the Jayabaya) by extending its route to Semarang Tawang due to the demand of the train passenger market on the northern Java line. The launch of the Gunungjati train was carried out on 1 February 2025 at Cirebon. This inauguration was carried out by the Director of Strategic Planning and Infrastructure Management of KAI, John Robertho, together with the acting Mayors of Cirebon, Agus Mulyadi, and the board of directors of Operational Area III Cirebon. On the inaugural trip, the Gunungjati train series consisted of four executive cars, four economy class cars, one dining car, and one power train. The Gunungjati train departed from Cirebon to Gambir in the morning, towards Semarang and vice versa in the morning/evening and while the direction to Cirebon in the evening.

== Station ==
Here's route of the Gunungjati train is:

- Semarang Tawang Bank Jateng (Start/End for 117 and 120)
- Pekalongan
- Pemalang
- Tegal
- Cirebon (start/end for 118 and 119)
- Babakan
- Arjawinangun
- Jatibarang
- Haurgeulis
- Pegaden Baru
- Cikampek
- Bekasi
- Jatinegara
- Gambir (Start/End)
