= Bekasi railway station =

Railway station in Indonesia

C21 Bekasi Station Stasiun Bekasi
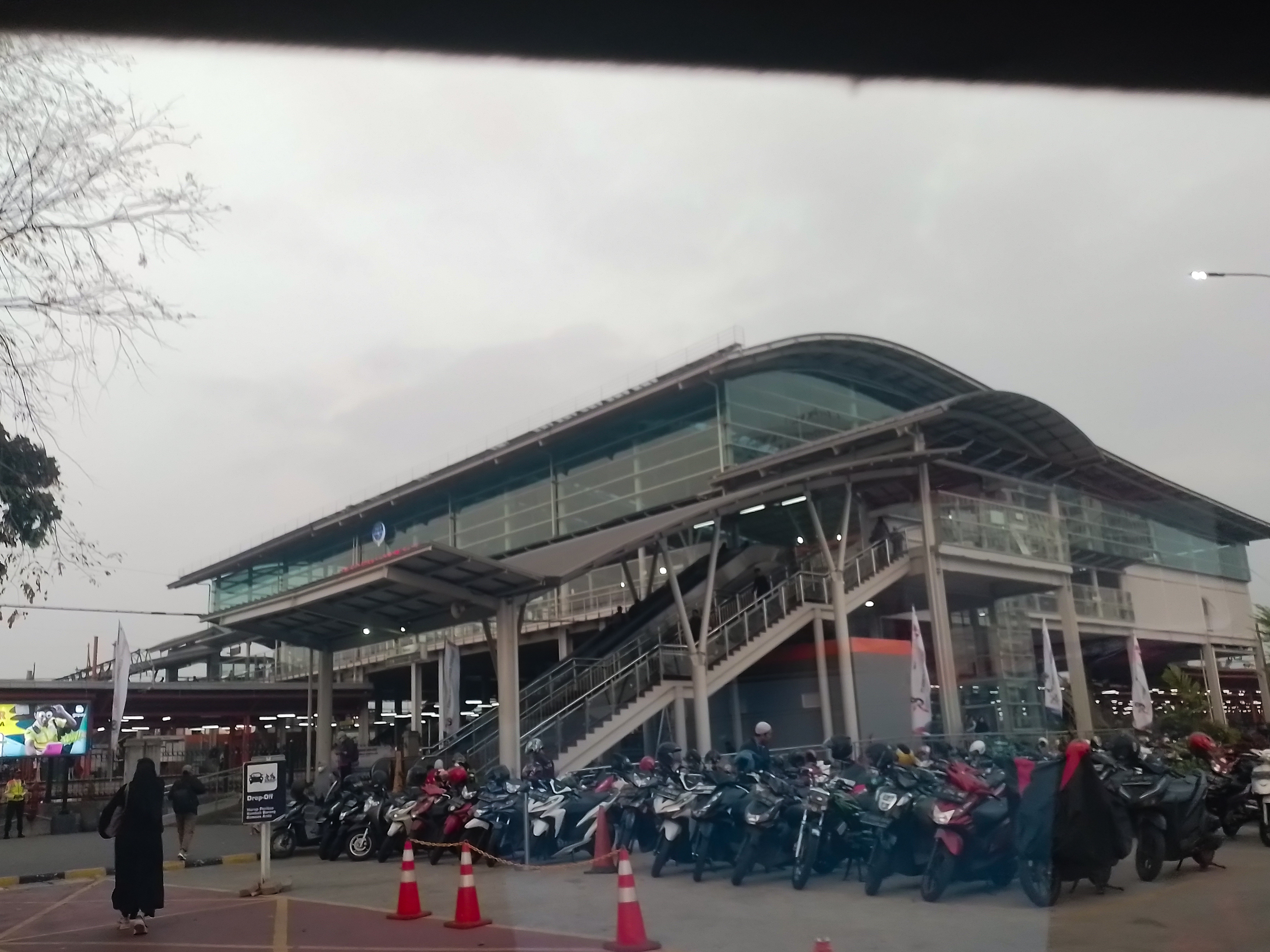
- Exterior of the station, 2023

General information
- Location: Jl. Ir. H. Juanda (south entrance); Jl. Perjuangan (north entrance), Marga Mulya, North Bekasi, Bekasi; West Java; Indonesia
- Coordinates: 6.2359°S 106.9986°E
- Elevation: +19 m (62 ft)
- Owner: Kereta Api Indonesia
- Operator: Kereta Api Indonesia; KAI Commuter
- Lines: Rajawali–Cikampek railway; Cikarang Loop Line
- Platforms: 3 island platform
- Tracks: 6

Construction
- Structure type: Ground
- Parking: Available
- Cycle facilities: Available
- Accessible: Available

Other information
- Station code: BKS • 0504
- Classification: Large class type C

History
- Opened: March 1887
- Former names: Bekassie Station

Passengers
- 2018: 15 million

Services
Preceding station		Following station
Kranji towards Angke, Kampung Bandan or Jakarta Kota	Commuter Line Cikarang Terminus for some services	Bekasi Timur towards Cikarang
Location
- Location within Bekasi

Bekasi Station (BKS) is a railway station located in Marga Mulya, North Bekasi, Bekasi, West Java. Located on an altitude of +19 meters above sea level, this station serves the KRL Commuterline and inter-city trains major cities in Java.

== History ==
In March 1887, the Batavia–Bekasi section of the railway line was completed by the Bataviasche Oosterspoorweg Maatschappij (BOS). At first, BOS decided to build a railway line from Batavia to Karawang, but what materialized was Batavia–Kedunggedeh (to the west of Karawang). This company had experienced debt problems, so the Staatsspoorwegen chose to purchase the BOS line in 1898. With the purchase of this line, the stations on this line were also improved, namely by replacing the station building with a more permanent building that still carried the Indische style—like the other stations on the SS line at that time—and the line was extended to Karawang, then Cikampek on 27 December 1902.

Bekasi Station is a silent witness to historical events on the banks of the Bekasi River. From this station, Japanese soldier prisoner were tortured in the river on 19 October 1945. The Japanese naval officer, Rear Admiral Tadashi Maeda, did not accept the torture, but eventually forgave it. To commemorate this historic event, the Kali Bekasi Memorial Monument was established.

To support the operation of the Jabotabek KRL in Bekasi, Perumka built an overhead line substation in September–November 1992. Since then, the Jabotabek KRL began to operate on this line.

== Building and layout ==
Bekasi Station initially had five tracks with track 1 through 4 being straight tracks similar to Depok Station plus additional tracks for loading and unloading coal transport on the southwest side of the emplacement.

The construction of the Manggarai–Cikarang quadruple-track railway section was carried out so that the main railway line increased to four. This is done so that the commuter trains, freight trains, and inter-city trains will not cross paths and disrupt each other.

In connection with the construction of the quadruple-track railway, PT KAI, PT. KCI (operated as KAI Commuter), Bekasi City Government, and the Directorate General of Railways decided to renovate this station. In addition, the track layout at this station was overhauled. The new station building carries a modern minimalist concept and is made into a multilevel station like other stations on the Cikarang–Klender route. The characteristics of the Staatsspoorwegen heritage station building are no longer visible due to the impact of the renovations carried out. When the construction of the new station on the south side was completed, the land that used to be the loading and unloading lane for coal transport at this station has been converted into an additional line emplacement for KRL Commuterline and temporarily decommissioned lines 1-3 to continue the construction of the new station building on the north side.

After the construction of the new station on the north side has been completed and the Cakung–Bekasi quadruple-track railway started operations in mid-December 2022, the number of lines at this station was increased to eight. Line 2 is used as a straight track for non-KRL trains heading to Jatinegara, line 3 is used as a straight track for non-KRL trains heading for Cikarang–Cikampek, line 5 is used as a straight line for commuter trains towards Jatinegara, and line 6 is used as a straight line for commuter trains towards Cikarang. Lines 1-3 are used for long-distance passenger train stops, line 4 can be used for both inter-city passenger train stops and commuter train stops, lines 5-7 are used for commuter trains, and line 8 is for train chain parking. The quadruple-track railway line ends to the east of the station, to be precise at a level crossing to the east of the Bekasi River Bridge.

The building currently has an area of 3,600 m² equipped with praying rooms, toilets, escalators, and elevators.

C21
1
North building
G
Line 1
Intercity-train stop from and towards Jatinegara
Island platform
Line 2
Intercity-train stop from the east to Jatinegara

Direct tracks to Jatinegara (via DDT)

Line 3
Intercity-train stop from Jatinegara

Direct tracks to Cikarang–Cikampek (via DDT)

Island platform
Line 4
Intercity-train stop from and towards Jatinegara

← (Kranji) Cikarang Loop Line towards Jatinegara loop

Island platform
Line 5
← (Kranji) Cikarang Loop Line towards Jatinegara loop

Direct tracks to Jatinegara

Line 6
Cikarang Loop Line to Cikarang (Bekasi Timur) →

Direct tracks to Cikampek

Island platform
Line 7
Cikarang Loop Line to Cikarang (Bekasi Timur) →
Line 8
Rail siding
1
South building

== Services ==
On 1 March 2012, PT KAI has implemented a policy that all long and medium distance inter-city trains do not stop at this station. However, on 1 July 2013, a decree was enacted which allowed several long and medium-distance inter-city trains to disembark passengers at this station.

On 19 June 2018, several travel schedules for the Soekarno–Hatta Airport Rail Link had been extended across services so that it reached the Bekasi area. However, the rail link trip was trimmed to its original route, namely from BNI City–Soekarno-Hatta Airport to optimize the service. According to the results of an evaluation conducted by PT Railink, the airport rail link trips when crossing Manggarai Station often experience delays due to constraints on the readiness of the station's infrastructure, which at that time was still in a series of renovations.

The following is a list of train services at the Bekasi Station.

=== Passenger services ===
==== Kereta Api Indonesia ====
- Executive class
  - Argo Bromo Anggrek (no stopped), towards Gambir and towards Surabaya Pasar Turi (available executive train type compartment suite)
  - Argo Muria, towards Gambir
  - Parahyangan, towards Gambir and towards Bandung (available executive train type luxury)
  - Bima & Argo Semeru, towards Gambir and towards Surabaya Gubeng
  - Sembrani, towards Gambir and towards Surabaya Pasar Turi (available executive train type luxury)
  - Taksaka, towards Gambir (no stopped, available executive train type luxury)
  - Purwojaya, towards Gambir
- Mixed class
  - Argo Parahyangan, towards Gambir and towards Bandung (Bandung or Kiaracondong) (executive-economy)
  - Argo Cheribon, towards Gambir and towards Cirebon-Tegal
  - Singasari, towards Pasar Senen and towards Blitar (executive-economy)
  - Gaya Baru Malam Selatan, towards Pasar Senen (executive-economy)
  - Jayabaya, towards Pasar Senen (executive-economy)
  - Brantas, towards Pasar Senen (executive-economy-business)
  - Gumarang, towards Pasar Senen (executive-economy)
  - Senja Utama Solo, towards Pasar Senen (executive-economy-business)
  - Mataram, towards Pasar Senen (executive-business)
  - Gajahwong, towards Pasar Senen (executive-economy)
  - Senja Utama Yogya, towards Pasar Senen (executive-economy)
  - Sawunggalih, towards Pasar Senen (executive-economy)
  - Pangandaran, towards Banjar (executive-economy)
  - Kertajaya, towards Pasar Senen (business-economy)
- Economy class
  - Jayakarta, towards Jakarta Kota and towards Surabaya Gubeng
  - Kertajaya, towards Pasar Senen and towards Surabaya Pasar Turi
  - Kutojaya Utara, towards Jakarta Kota and towards Kutoarjo
  - Tawang Jaya, towards Pasar Senen
  - Menoreh, towards Jakarta Kota and towards Semarang Tawang
  - Matarmaja, towards Pasar Senen and towards Malang
  - Bengawan, towards Jakarta Kota and towards Purwosari
  - Progo, towards Pasar Senen
  - Serayu, towards Pasar Senen and towards Purwokerto
  - Tegal Bahari, towards Pasar Senen and towards Tegal

==== KAI Commuter ====
- Cikarang Loop Line (Full Racket)
  - to Cikarang (direct service)
  - to Cikarang (looping through Manggarai-Kampung Bandan-Pasar Senen and vice versa)
- Cikarang Loop Line (Half Racket), to Angke/Kampung Bandan (via Tanah Abang and Duri) and Cikarang

=== Freight services ===
There is no freight services at this station, last it server coal train from Cigading.

== Supporting transportation ==
Type	Route	Destination
Angkot (share taxis)	K01	Aren Jaya–Pulogadung
Angkot (share taxis)	K02	Bekasi Bus Terminal–Pondok Gede market
Angkot (share taxis)	K04	Bekasi Bus Terminal–Kayuringin Raya
Angkot (share taxis)	K05	Bekasi Bus Terminal–Jakasetia (via K.H. Noer Ali)
Angkot (share taxis)	K05A	Bekasi Bus Terminal–Jakasetia (via Pemuda–Patriot)
Angkot (share taxis)	K07	Bekasi Bus Terminal–Harapan Jaya
Angkot (share taxis)	K09B	Kayuringin Raya–Teluk Pucung
Trans Patriot (BRT)	01	Harapan Indah modern market–Bekasi Bus Terminal
Trans Patriot (BRT)	02	Alam Vida market–Summarecon Mall Bekasi
Trans Patriot (BRT)	03	Sumber Arta market–Wisma Asri traditional market

== Gallery ==
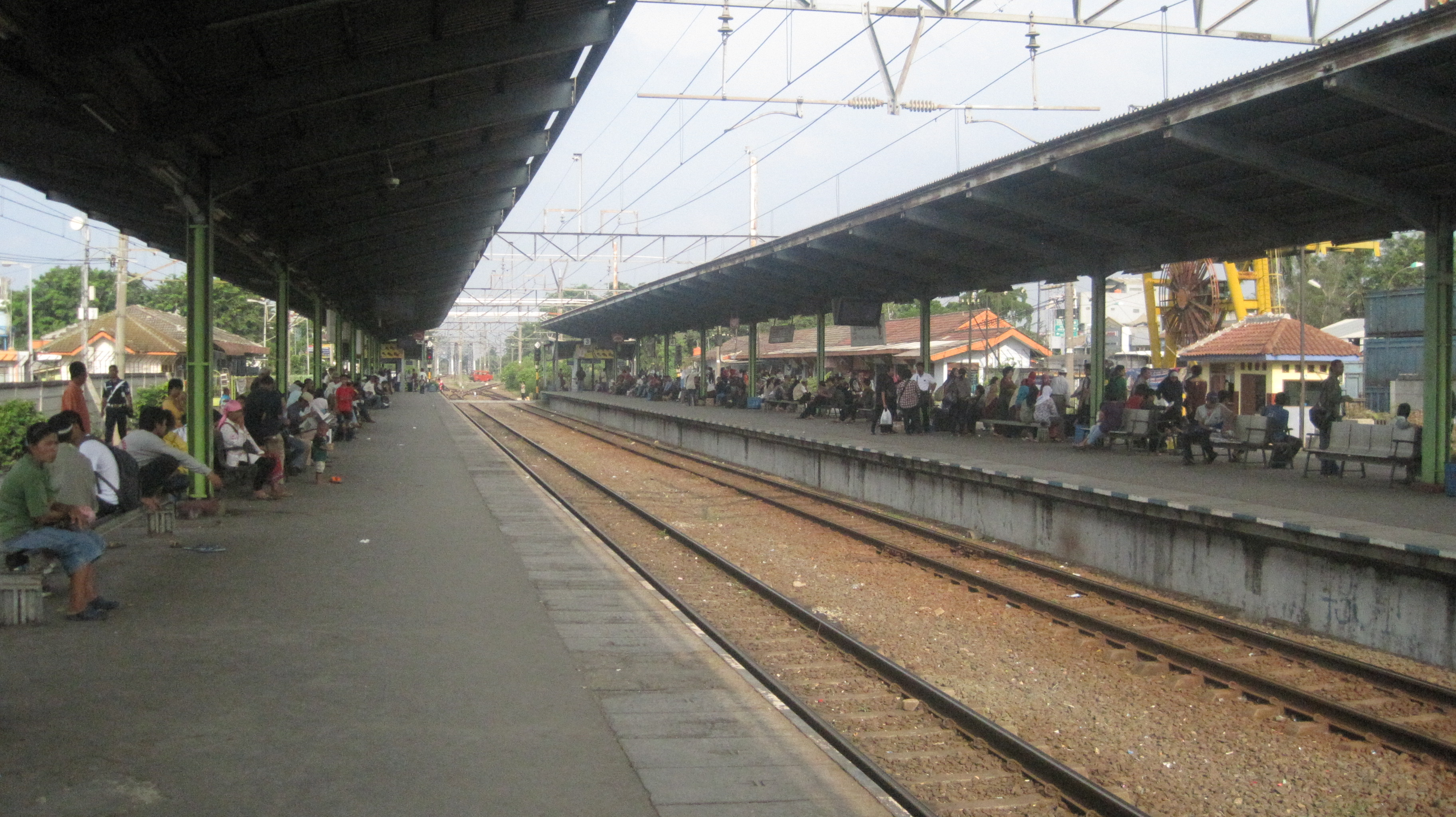
The platform of the station

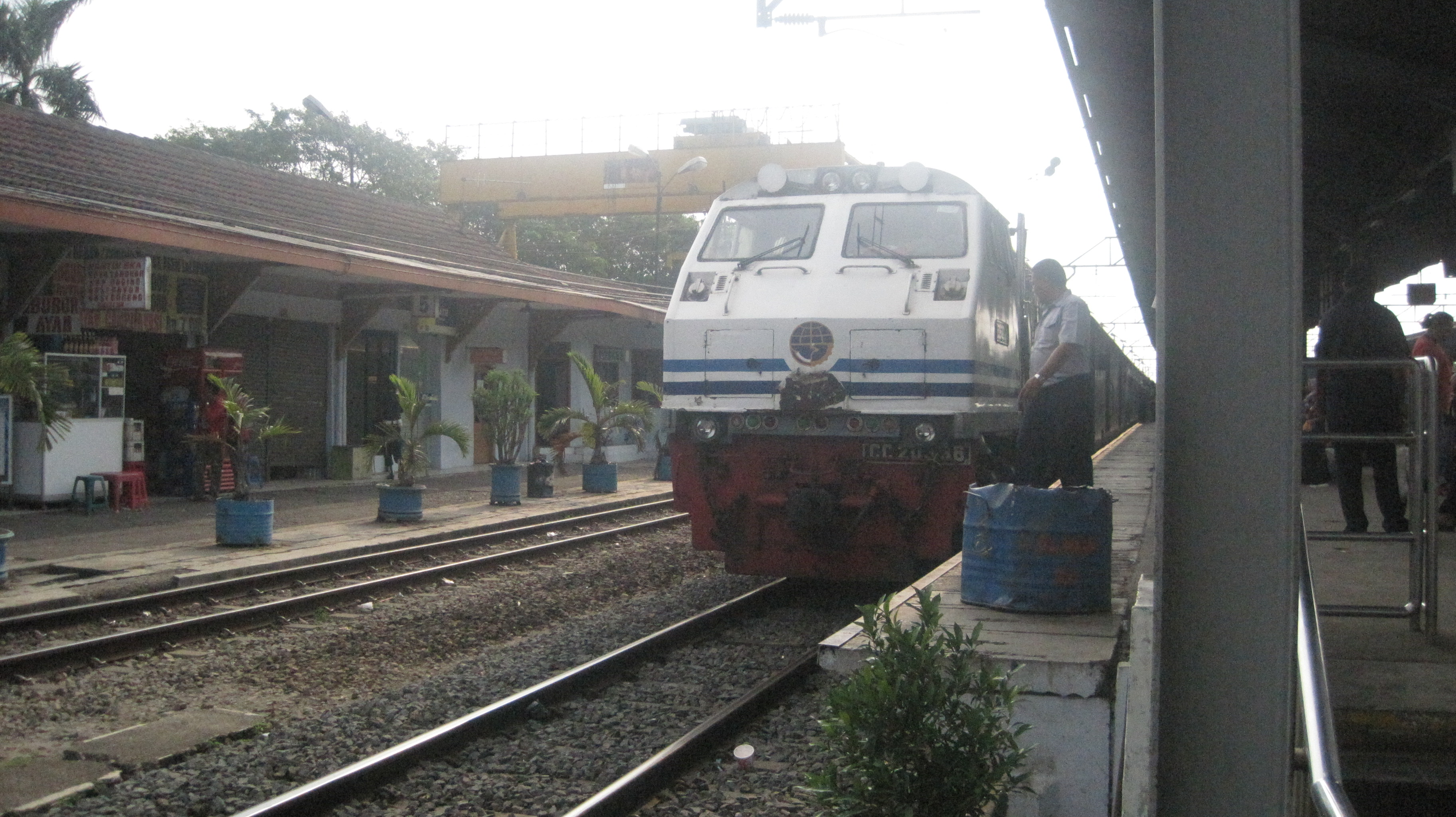
CC203 38 locomotive arriving at Bekasi station

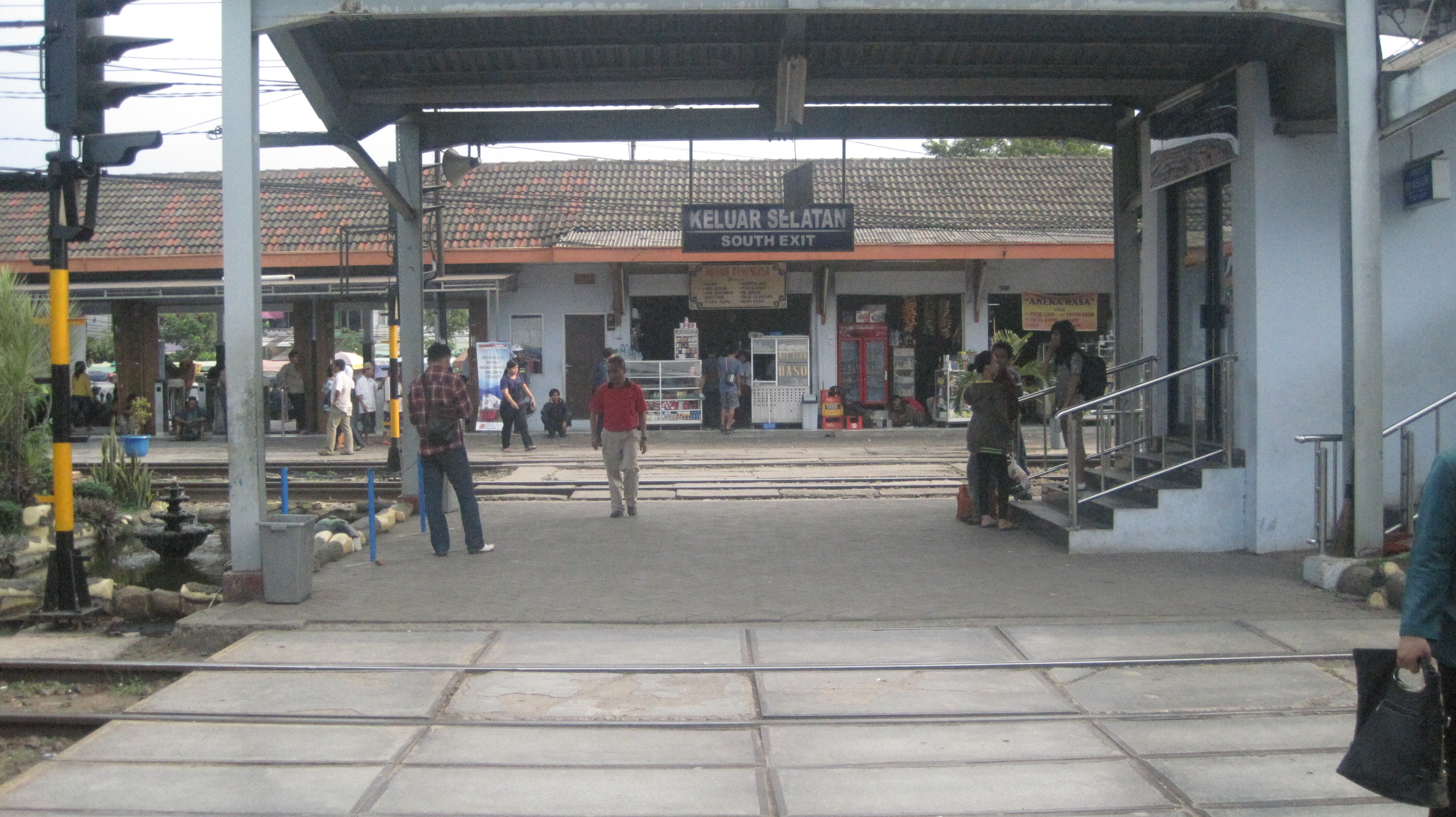
The old building of the station

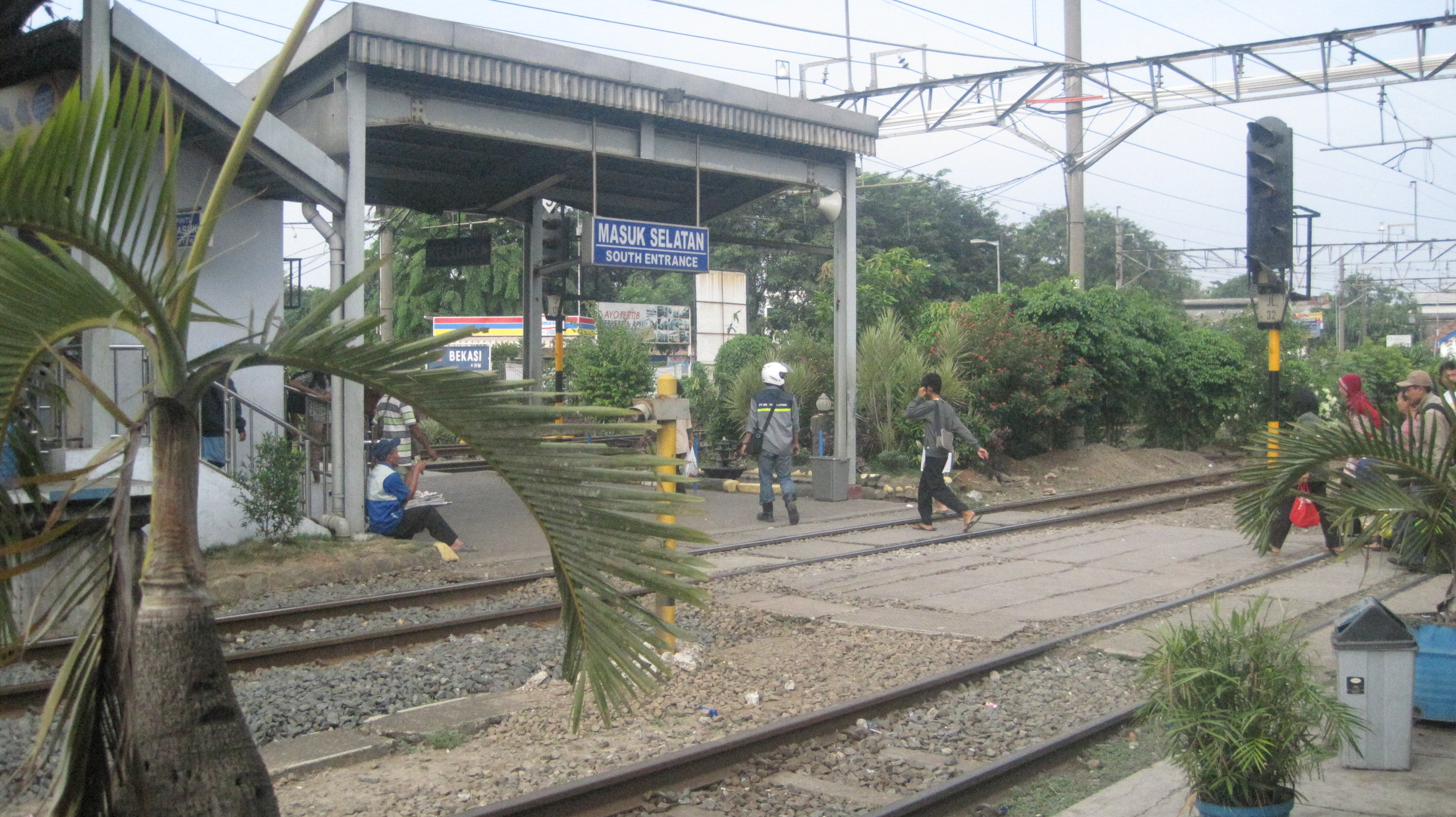
The south departure gate

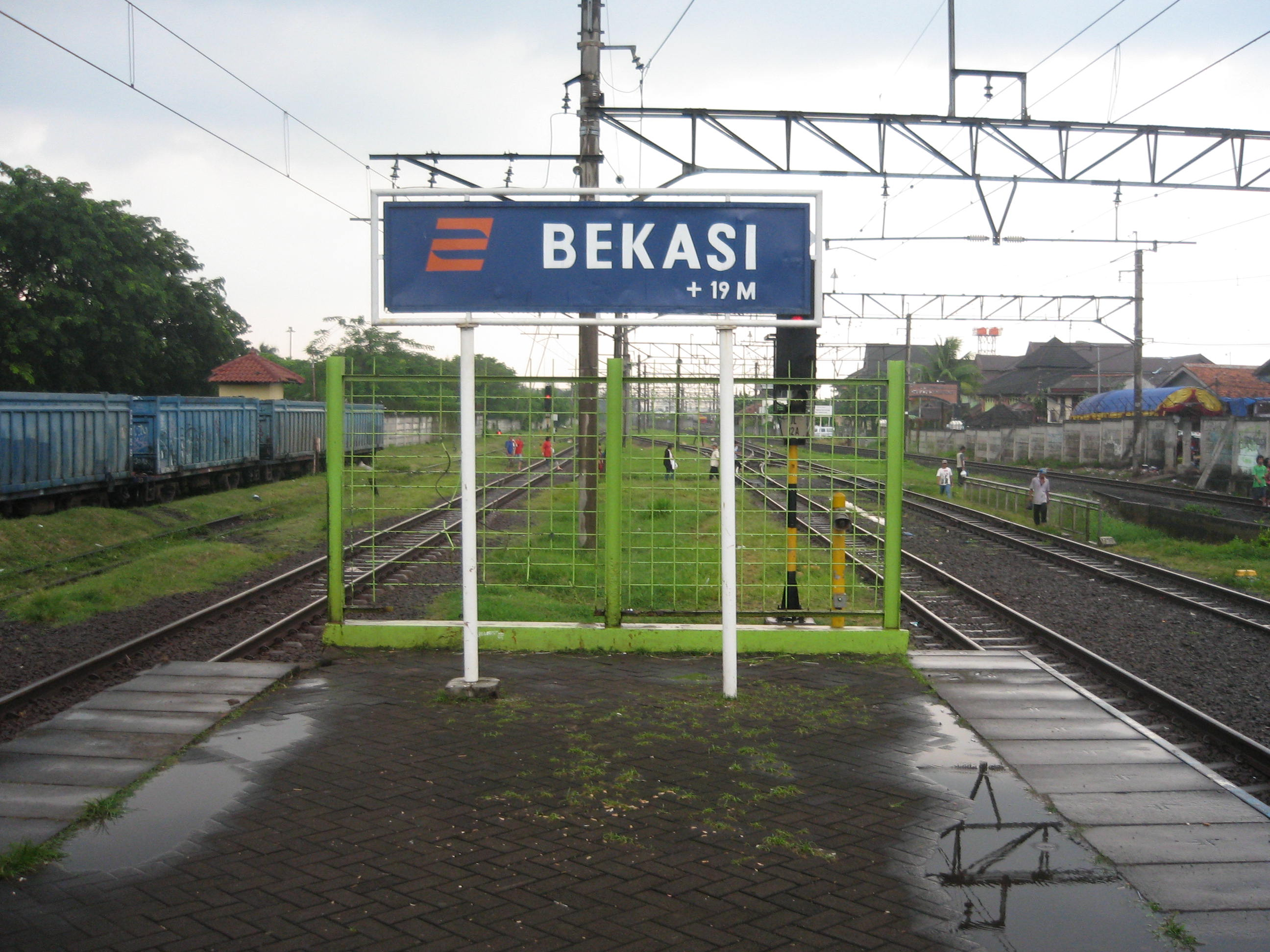
The old signage of the station (2011)

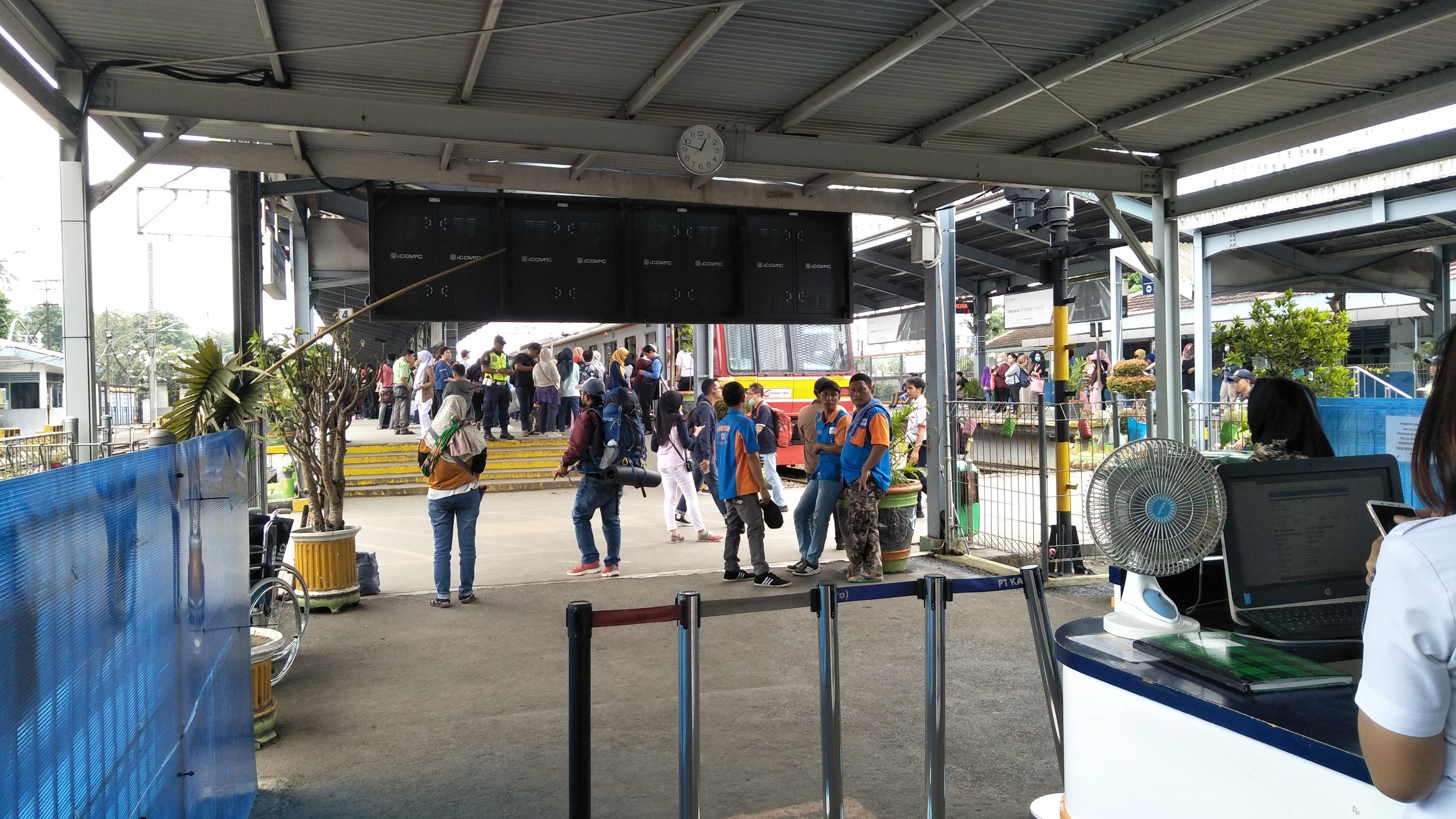
Waiting area for long-distance train passengers, March 2019

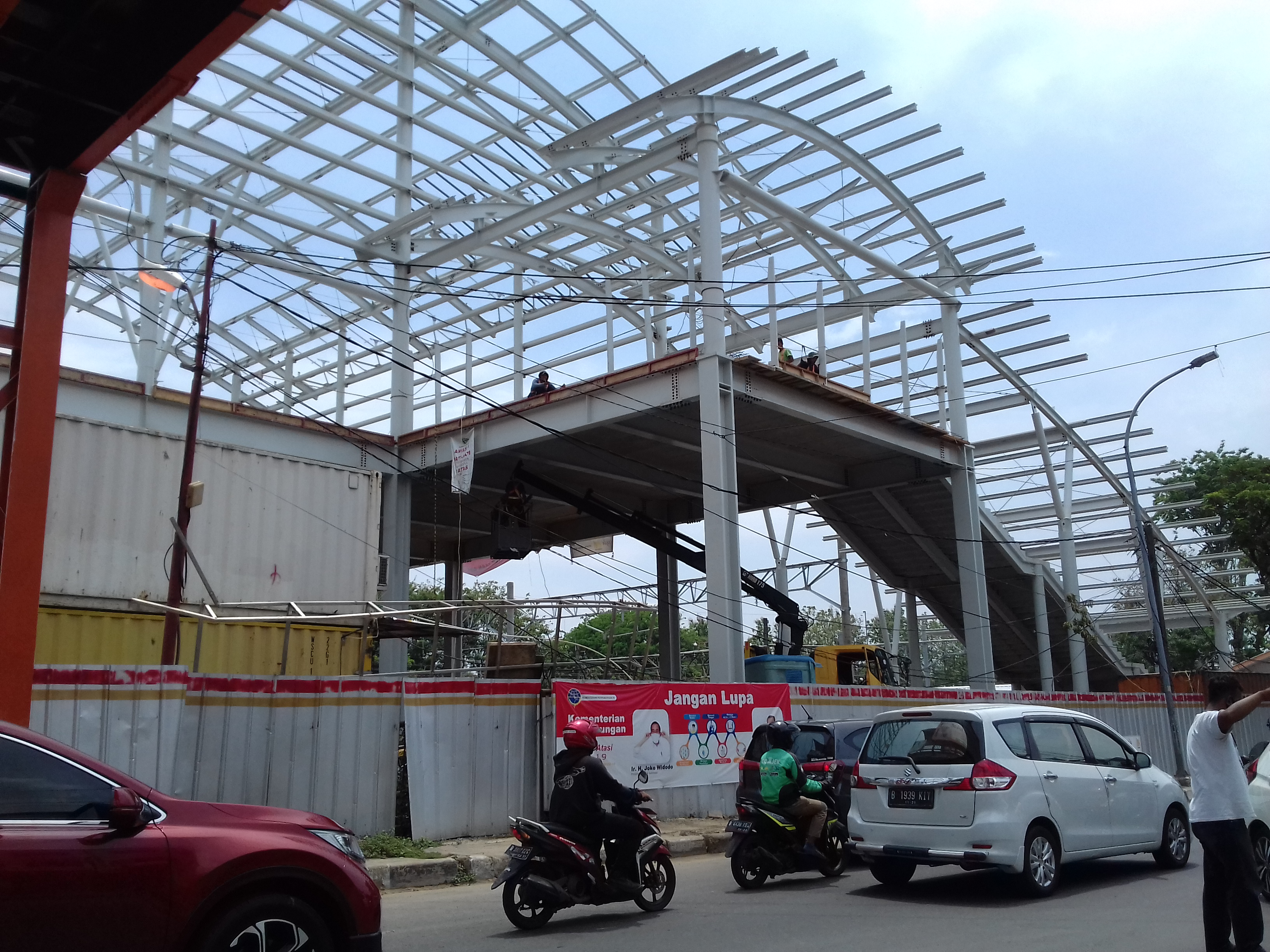
The south building renovation on 14 October 2020

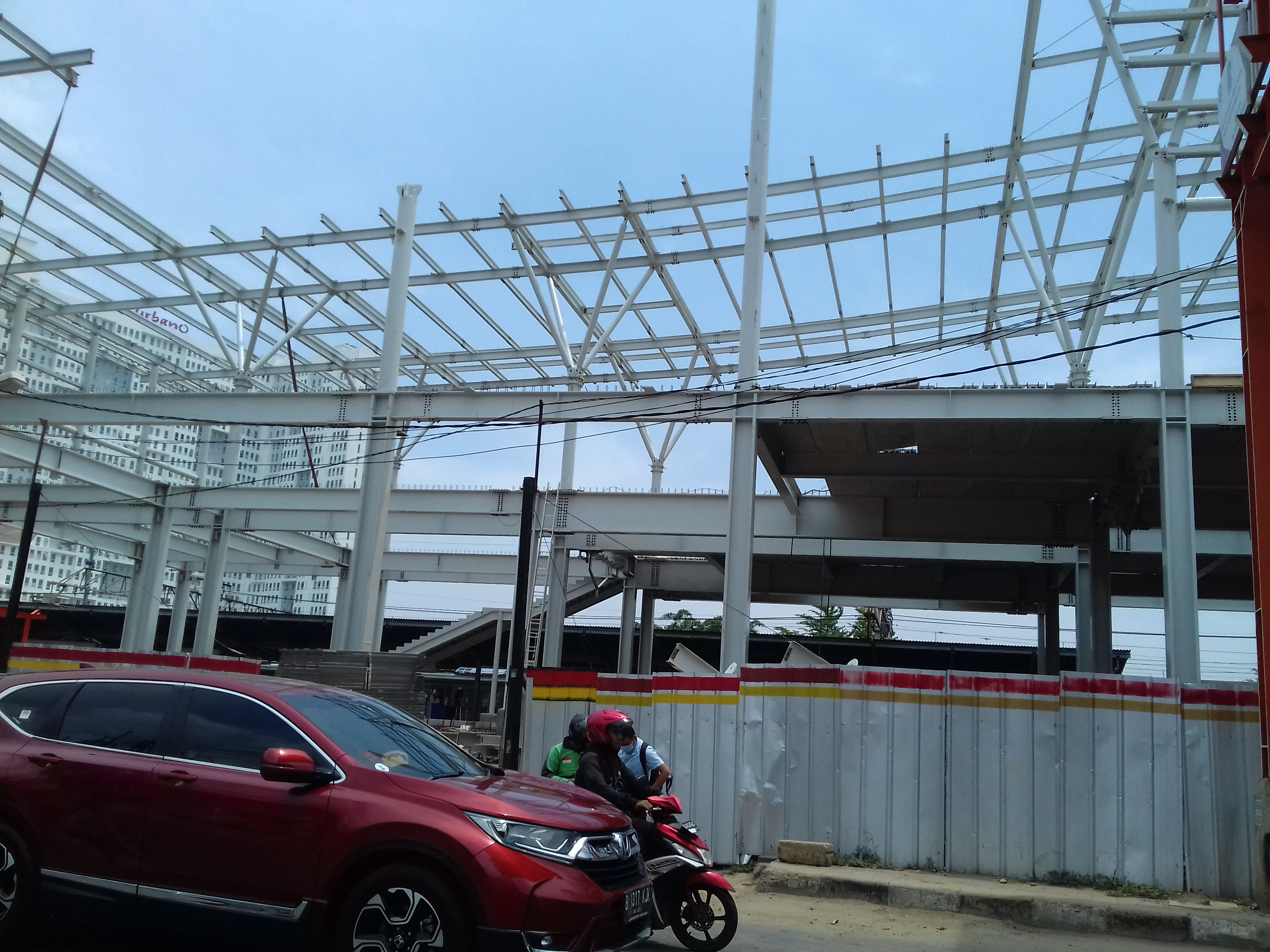
The south building renovation on 14 October 2020

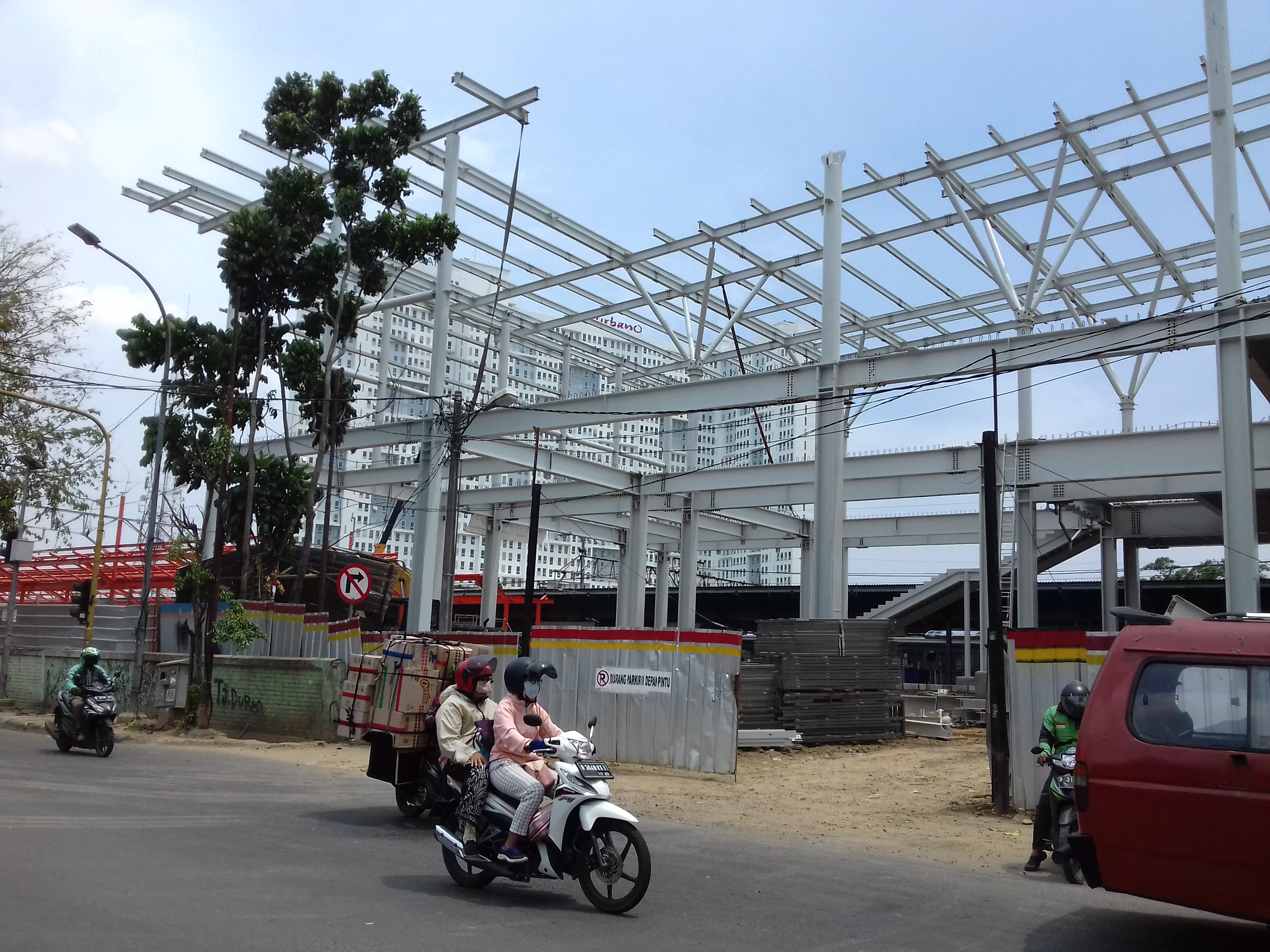
The south building renovation on 14 October 2020

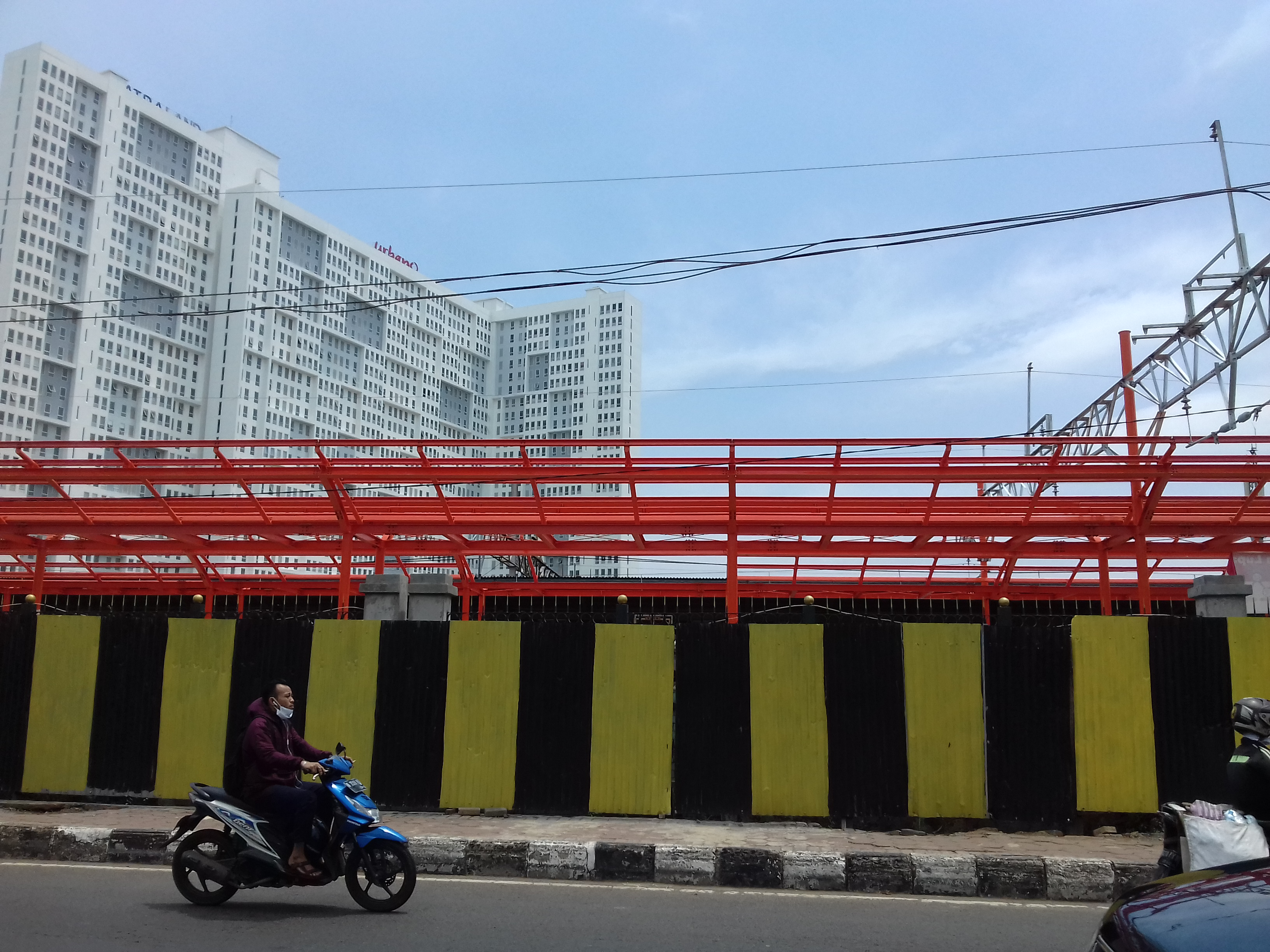
The construction of the new platform on the south side of the station on 14 October 2020

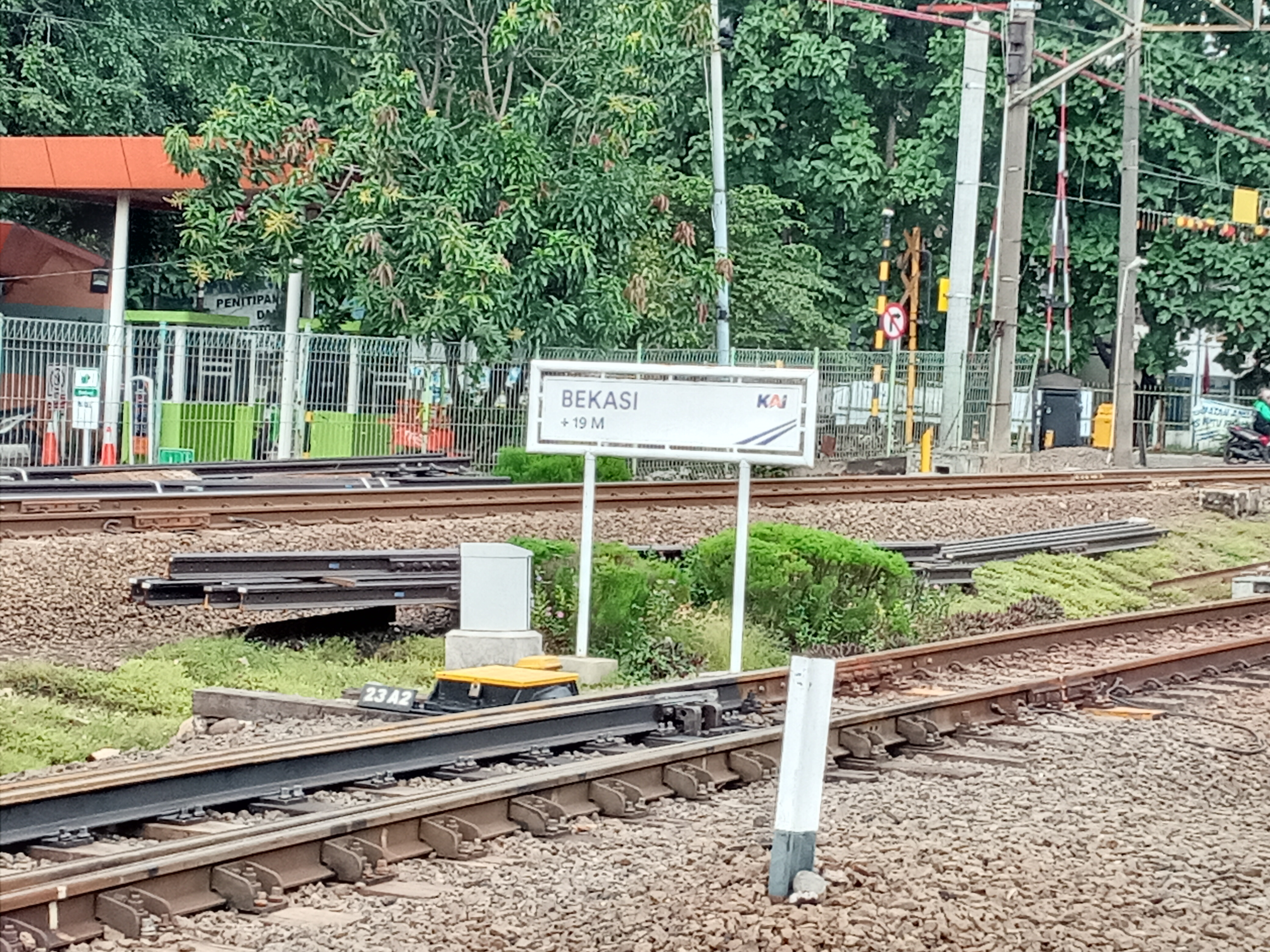
The new station signage as of April 2021

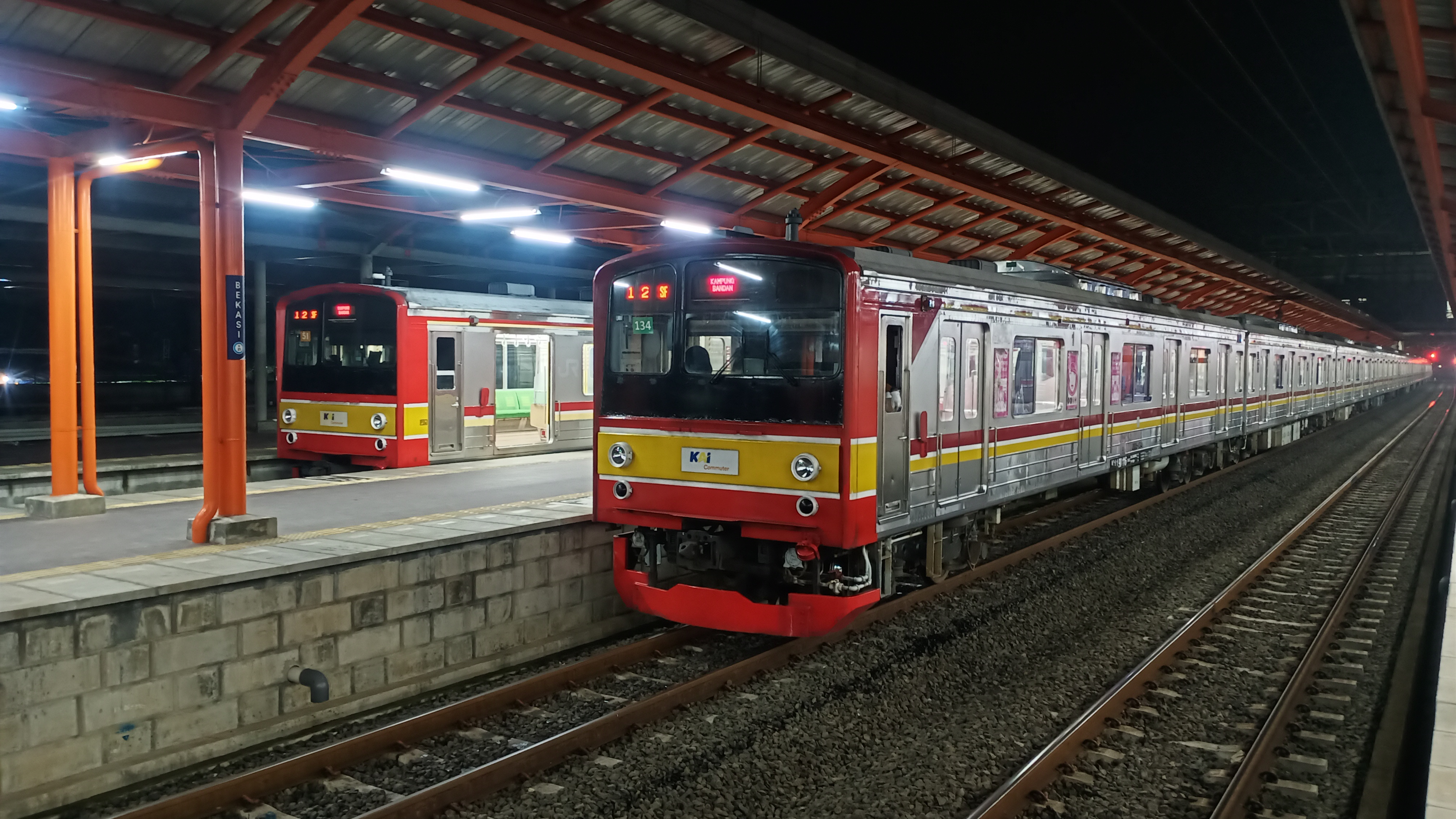
Two KRL 205 series trains at the Bekasi station

Preceding station	Kereta Api Indonesia	Following station
Kranji towards Rajawali	Rajawali–Cikampek	Bekasi Timur towards Cikampek
