= Adisumarmo Airport Rail Link =

Airport rail link in Central Java, Indonesia

Adisumarmo Airport Raillink Services (ARS)
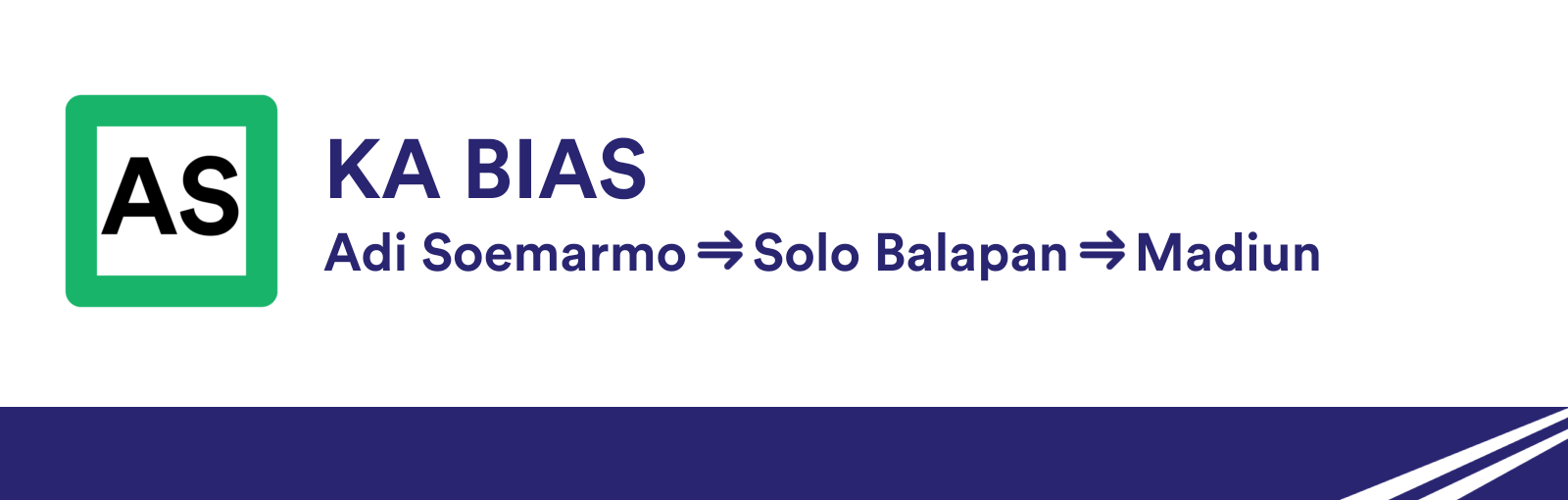
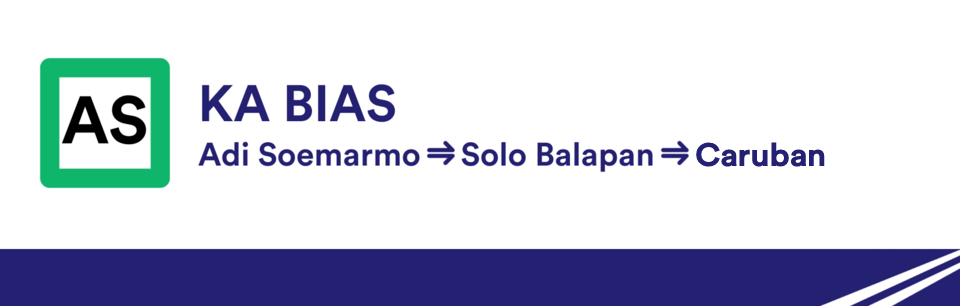

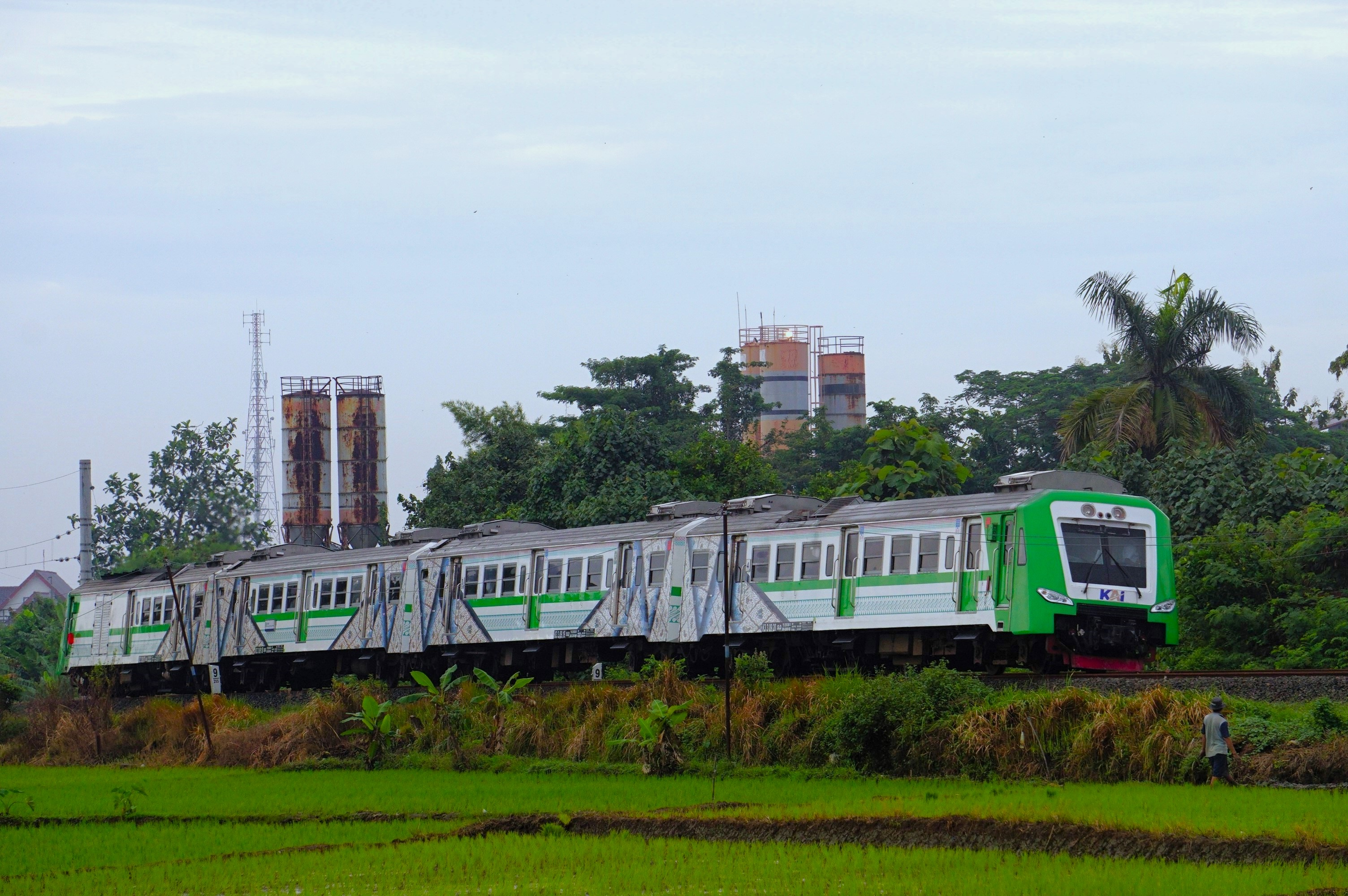
- The Adisumarmo Airport Rail Link departs from Palur Station bound for Madiun Station on 7 February 2026

Overview
- Native name: Kereta api Bandara Internasional Adisumarmo
- Status: In service
- Owner: Kereta Api Indonesia; Angkasa Pura I
- Locale: Central Java, East Java, Indonesia
- Termini: Adisoemarmo International Airport; Solo Balapan-Madiun-Caruban
- Stations: 11

Service
- Type: Express rail
- System: Airport rail link
- Services: Adisoemarmo International Airport – Solo Balapan
- Operator: Indonesian Railway Company
- Rolling stock: ME204 (DEMU INKA); MH102 (KRDI DMU) ME201 (ex. BN-Holec/Prambanan Express DEMU)

History
- Planned opening: November 2018; 7 years ago
- Opened: 29 December 2019

Technical
- Line length: 110 km (68 mi)
- Num of tracks: Single track
- Character: Ground + Elevated
- Track gauge: 1,067 mm (3 ft 6 in)
- Electrification: NIL
- Operating speed: 60 km/h (37 mph)

Adisumarmo Airport Rail Link (Indonesian: Kereta api Bandara Internasional Adisumarmo) is an airport rail link service in Central Java, Indonesia. The service was built to cut travel time from Caruban and Madiun -Surakarta city center to Adisoemarmo International Airport. It is operated by Kereta Api Indonesia (KAI) because its subsidiary KAI Bandara doesn't have stakes owned by Angkasa Pura I.

The Adisumarmo ARS is the fourth airport rail link in Indonesia connecting passengers between the city centre and airport after Kualanamu ARS, Soekarno–Hatta Commuter Line and Minangkabau Express. The train line between Adisoemarmo International Airport station and Solo Balapan opened on 29 December 2019. The trains are manufactured by INKA.

== Background ==
A new railway is being constructed to the airport. The 13.5-kilometre (8.4 mi) airport rail will connect Solo Balapan Station to Adi Soemarmo Airport. Construction of the airport rail line consists of two segments: segment 1, from Solo Balapan Station to Solo Baru Station along 3.5 kilometres (2.2 mi) which is the existing railway track. Meanwhile, segment 2, starting from Solo Baru Station to Adi Sumarmo Airport along the 10 kilometres (6.2 mi) to be built new railway line. By using this airport train, the distance from Solo to Adi Sumarmo Airport will only take about 15 minutes. The airport railway opened on 29 December 2019.

== History ==
Adisumarmo ARS first operation with route Solo Balapan station to Adisoemarmo International Airport on 29 December 2019.

From 21 February 2020, Adisumarmo ARS had route extension to Klaten

From 2 November 2024, Adisumarmo ARS had route extension from Madiun to Adisoemarmo International Airport for increasing load factor beside route to Klaten still operated.

From 10 December 2024, Adisumarmo ARS closed route from Klaten because low load factor (15% per day). Impact from that, Adisumarmo ARS from Madiun has addition of schedule to 5 round-trip per day.

From 17 August 2025, Adisumarmo ARS had route extension for 2 round-trip per day from Caruban to Adisoemarmo International Airport on the idea from Madiun Regent, Hari Wuryanto. Adisumarmo ARS also provide new stop station in Palur.

== Rolling stock ==
In April 2016, a contract for 10 six-carriage Electric Multiple Units was awarded to a consortium of local manufacturer PT Inka and Bombardier Transportation.

== Stations ==
Number	Station	Transfer/Notes	Location
AS11	Caruban	Intercity trains	Madiun Regency, East Java
AS10	Madiun Station	Intercity trains	Madiun, East Java
AS09	Magetan	Intercity trains	Magetan Regency, East Java
	Geneng	Note: Only KA 577 to Adisumarmo Airport	Ngawi Regency, East Java
AS08	Ngawi	Intercity trains	Ngawi Regency, East Java
AS07	Walikukun	Intercity trains	Ngawi Regency, East Java
AS06	Sragen	Intercity trains	Sragen Regency
AS05 Y13	Palur	KRL Commuterline Yogyakarta–Solo Batik Solo Trans: Line K1S, K4SB, FD2, FD10S (Plaza Palur)	Karanganyar Regency
AS04; Y12	Solo Jebres	Intercity trains KRL Commuterline Yogyakarta–Solo Batik Solo Trans: Line K1S, K3SB (Jebres) Trans Jateng: Line S2	Surakarta
AS03; Y11 JS01	Solo Balapan	Intercity trains KRL Commuterline Yogyakarta–Solo Joglosemarkerto Batik Solo Trans: Line FD2 (Balapan); Line K6S (Balapan) Tirtonadi Bus Terminal (via skybridge)	Surakarta
AS02	Kadipiro	Trans Jateng: Line S1 (Stasiun Kadipiro)	Surakarta
AS01	Adisoemarmo International Airport	Terminal station Adisumarmo International Airport Batik Solo Trans: Line K1S (Bandara)	Boyolali Regency

== See also ==
- Adisoemarmo International Airport
- Kualanamu Airport Rail Link
- Soekarno–Hatta Airport Commuter Line
- Minangkabau Express
- Yogyakarta International Airport Rail Link
- Surakarta metropolitan area
