= Adisoemarmo International Airport railway station =

Railway station in Indonesia

AS05 Adisoemarmo International Airport Station Stasiun Bandara Internasional Adisoemarmo
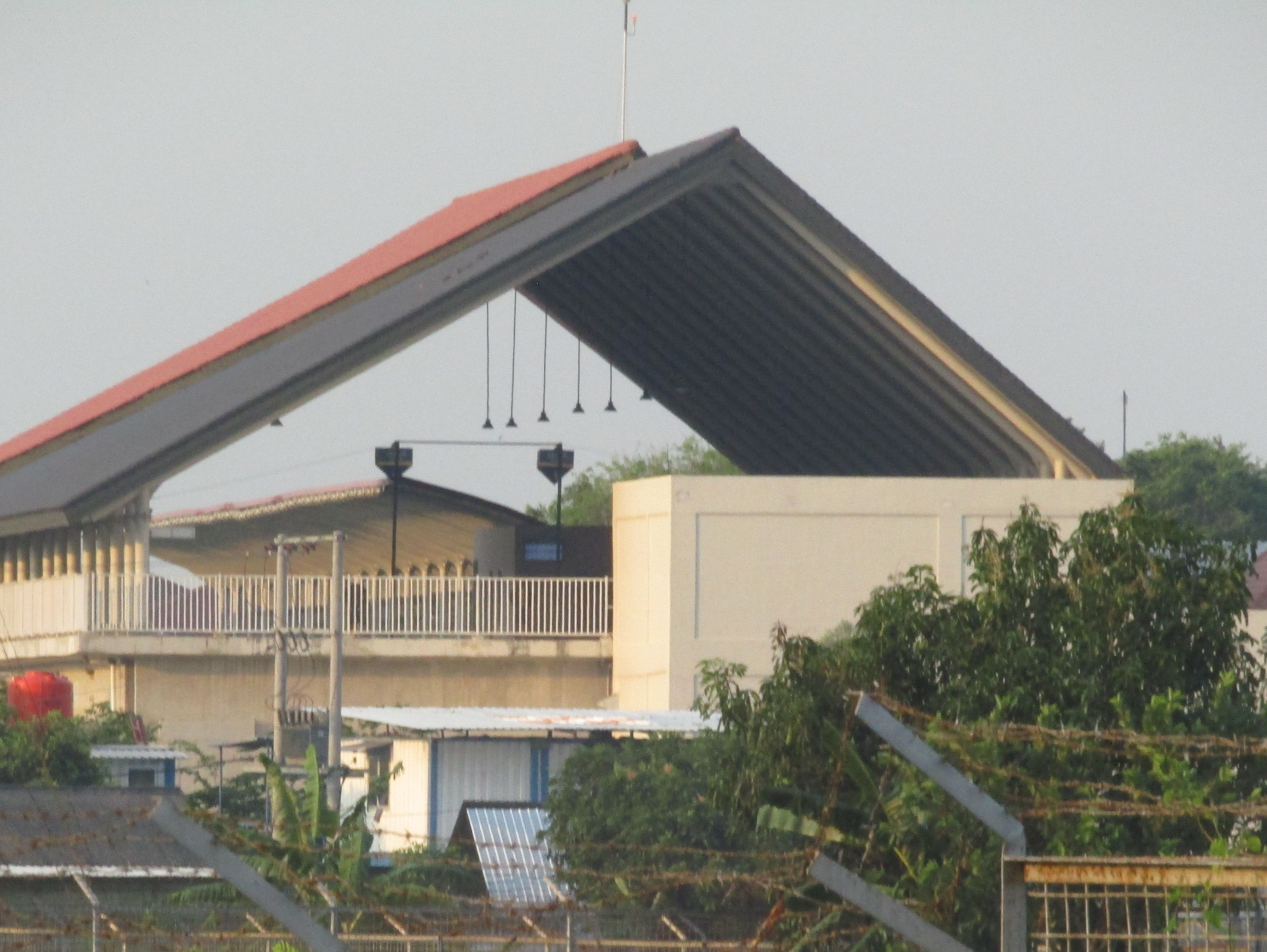
- Outside view of Adisoemarmo International Airport Station from the runway, photo was taken on 22 August 2020.

General information
- Location: Ngesrep, Ngemplak, Boyolali Regency; Central Java; Indonesia
- Coordinates: 7.51344°S 110.747883°E
- Owner: Kereta Api Indonesia
- Operator: Kereta Api Indonesia
- Line: Adisumarmo Airport Rail Link
- Platforms: 2 side platforms
- Tracks: 2
- Connections: Batik Solo Trans: 1

Construction
- Structure type: Elevated
- Parking: Available
- Accessible: Available

Other information
- Station code: SMO
- IATA code: SOC
- Classification: Class I

History
- Opened: 29 December 2019

Services
Preceding station	Kereta Api Indonesia	Following station
Kadipiro towards Klaten	Adisumarmo Airport Rail Link	Terminus
Location
- Location within Java

Adisoemarmo International Airport Station (SMO) (Note: The name of the station field is Adi Soemarmo. However, because this name comes from a figure in the Indonesian Air Force named Adisoemarmo Wirjokoesoemo, the naming of the station in the article follows the way they are named.) is an airport railway station located within the airport complex in Ngesrep, Ngemplak, Boyolali Regency. The station is situated on the north side of the entrance to Adisumarmo International Airport. The station is included under the Operational Area VI Yogyakarta.

The station was opened simultaneously with the operation of the Kadipiro–Adisoemarmo railway segment. The Adisumarmo Airport Rail Link began operating on 29 December 2019.

== Station layout ==
This station only have two railway tracks with line 2 is a straight track and it is a terminal station.

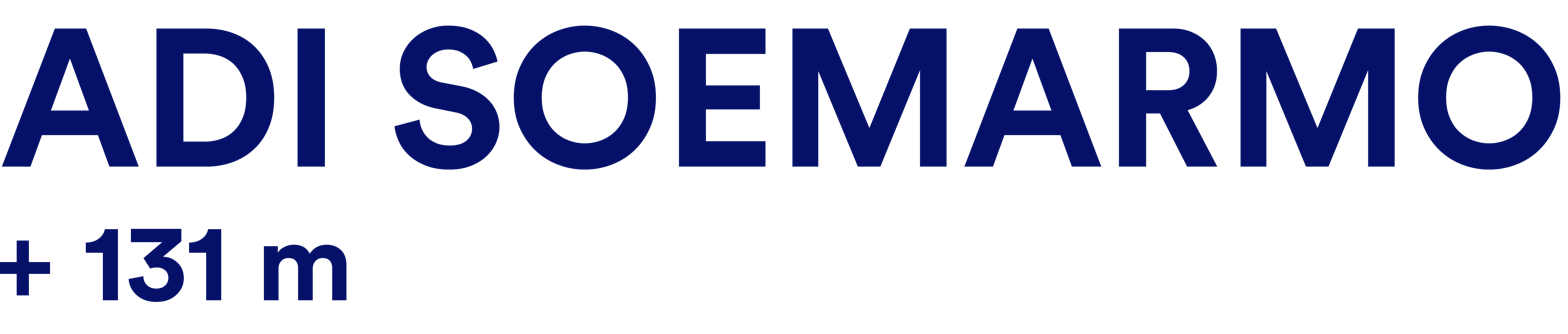
AS05
G	Main building
P Platform floor	Side platform, the doors are opened on the right side of the train arrival
P Platform floor	Line 1	Adisumarmo Airport Rail Link from and towards Solo Balapan-Klaten (Kadipiro) →
P Platform floor	Line 2	Adisumarmo Airport Rail Link from and towards Solo Balapan-Klaten (Kadipiro) →
P Platform floor	Side platform, the doors are opened on the left side of the train arrival

== Services ==
The following is a list of train services at the Adisoemarmo International Airport Station.

=== Passenger services ===
- Airport rail link
  - Adisumarmo Airport Rail Link, to Solo Balapan and Klaten

== Supporting transportation ==
Type	Route	Destination
Batik Solo Trans	1	Adisumarmo International Airport–Palur

== Notes ==
Preceding station	Kereta Api Indonesia	Following station
Kadipiro; Terminus	KDO–SMO	Terminus
