= Batara Kresna =

Local train service in Central Java, Indonesia

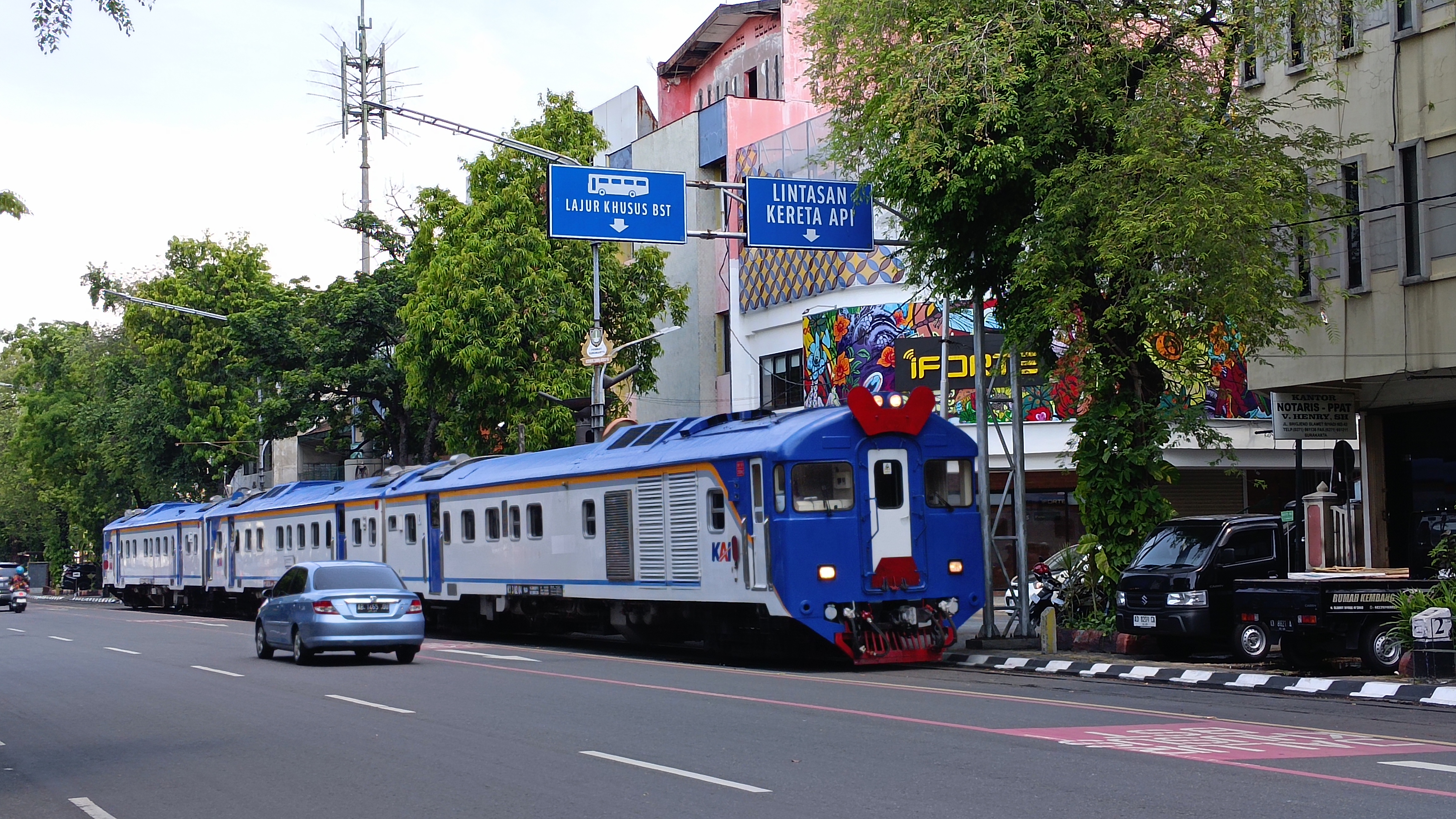

Overview
- Native name: Kereta Rel Diesel Batara Kresna
- Owner: Kereta Api Indonesia; Surakarta city government
- Locale: Surakarta Purwosari - Wonogiri
- Stations: 5

Service
- Type: Railbus
- Operator: Kereta Api Indonesia

History
- Opened: 5 August 2012; 14 years ago

Technical
- Line length: 37 km
- Character: Fully subsurface
- Track gauge: 1 067 mm
- Conduction system: With driver

Batara Kresna (Indonesian: Kereta Api Batara Kresna, Javanese: Batara Kresna Hanacaraka: ꦧꦠꦫꦏ꧀ꦫꦼꦱ꧀ꦤ) is a local train service in Central Java, Indonesia that operates between Purwosari Station in Surakarta and Wonogiri Station in Wonogiri Regency. It is operated by PT Kereta Api Indonesia (PT KAI) and is a cooperation project between the Surakarta city government and PT KAI, when the city was led by Joko Widodo. The service was the one of a few railbus service in Indonesia besides Lembah Anai railbus in West Sumatra and former Kertalaya railbus in South Sumatra.

The train took its name from a character in Mahabharata, Krishna or Kresna who is tasked with saving the world and upholding the truth after the war in Kurukshetra.

== History ==
Batara Kresna was introduced to the public on 26 July 2011 as a railbus and inaugurated by Indonesian Minister of Transport Freddy Numberi in Surakarta along with the city's double-decker tourist bus service. The railbus began operation on 5 August 2012, initially with Sukoharjo – Purwosari – Yogyakarta route.

Batara Kresna Railbus trainset was replaced with MCW 302 from Kedungsepur (train) from 1 February 2025, because operational maximal speed rail track Surakarta Purwosari - Wonogiri has been improved to 70 km/hour. Based on that, Batara Kresna has shorten journey time from 2 hour if using old trainset become 1 hour if using MCW 302 trainset.

== Stations ==
Note: Only lists active stations

Station Number	Station	Distance (km)		Transfers/Notes	Location
Station Number	Station	From previous station	From Purwosari Termini	Transfers/Notes	Location
BK01; Y10	Purwosari	-	0.0	Terminal station Intercity trains KRL Commuterline Yogyakarta–Solo Batik Solo Trans: Line FD2 (Purwosari) Sepur Kluthuk Jaladara	Surakarta
BK02	Solo Kota			Sepur Kluthuk Jaladara	Surakarta
BK03	Sukoharjo				Sukoharjo Regency
BK04	Pasarnguter				Sukoharjo Regency
BK05	Wonogiri			Terminal station trans jateng: Line S2	Wonogiri Regency

== Fares ==
Batara Kresna has flat fares Rp 4.000

Ticket are available in Access by KAI application or ticket booths in railway stations.

== Gallery ==
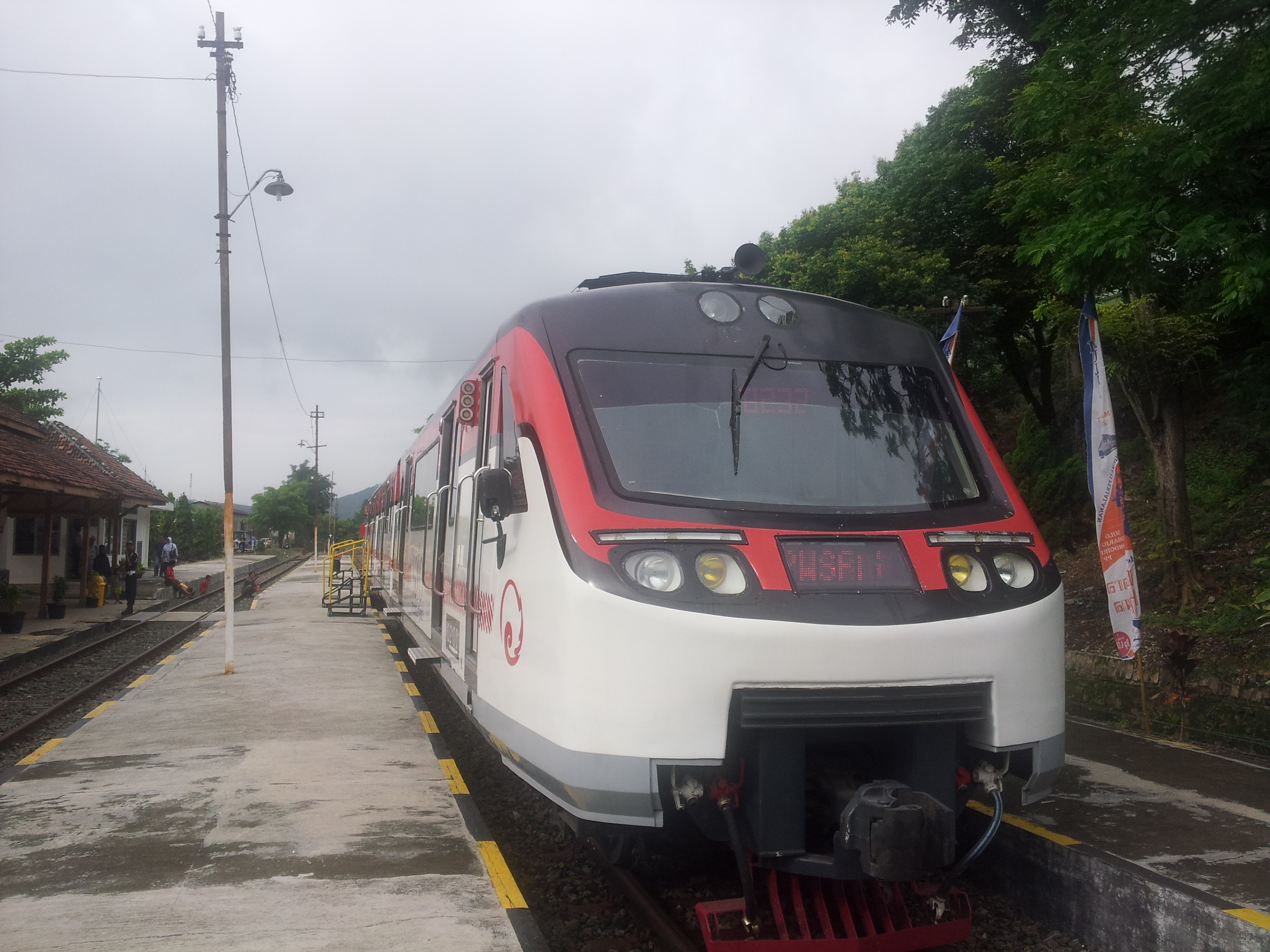
Railbus in Wonogiri Station

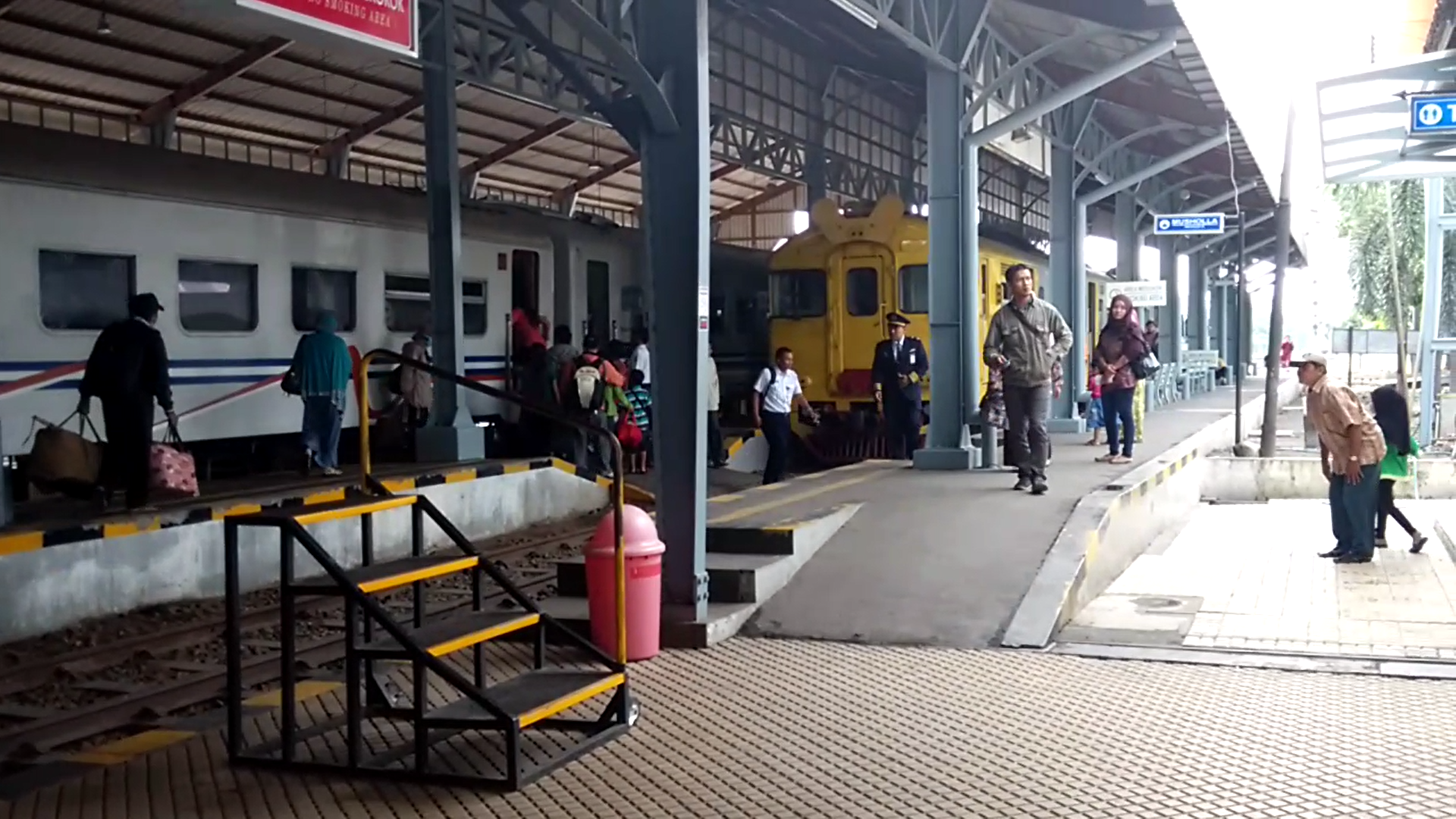
Batara Kresna while using Prambanan Ekspres backup stock

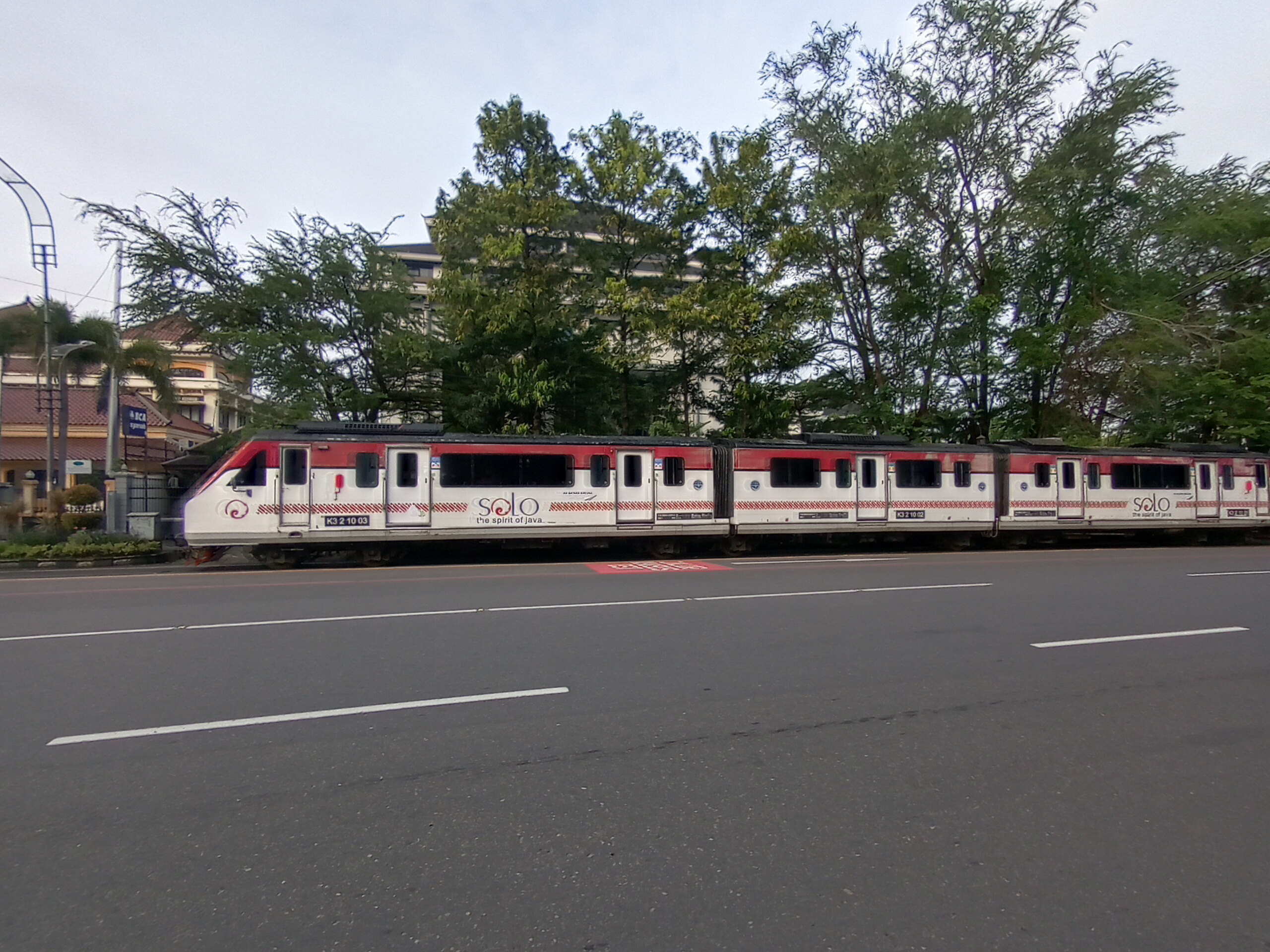
Batara Kresna railbus running along Jalan Slamet Riyadi in the middle of Surakarta City.

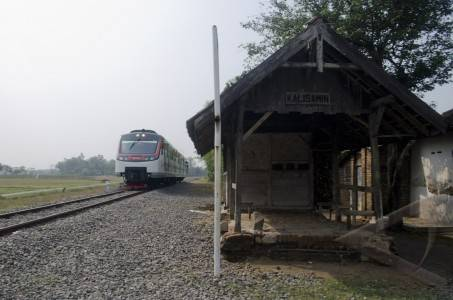
Batara Kresna crossing Halte Kalisamin.

== See also ==
- River Line (NJ Transit)
- Seetalbahn
- Surakarta metropolitan area
