= Surakarta metropolitan area =

Metropolitan area in Indonesia

Surakarta metropolitan area Solo Raya

Regional transcription(s)
  - Javanese: ꦱꦺꦴꦭꦺꦴꦫꦪ
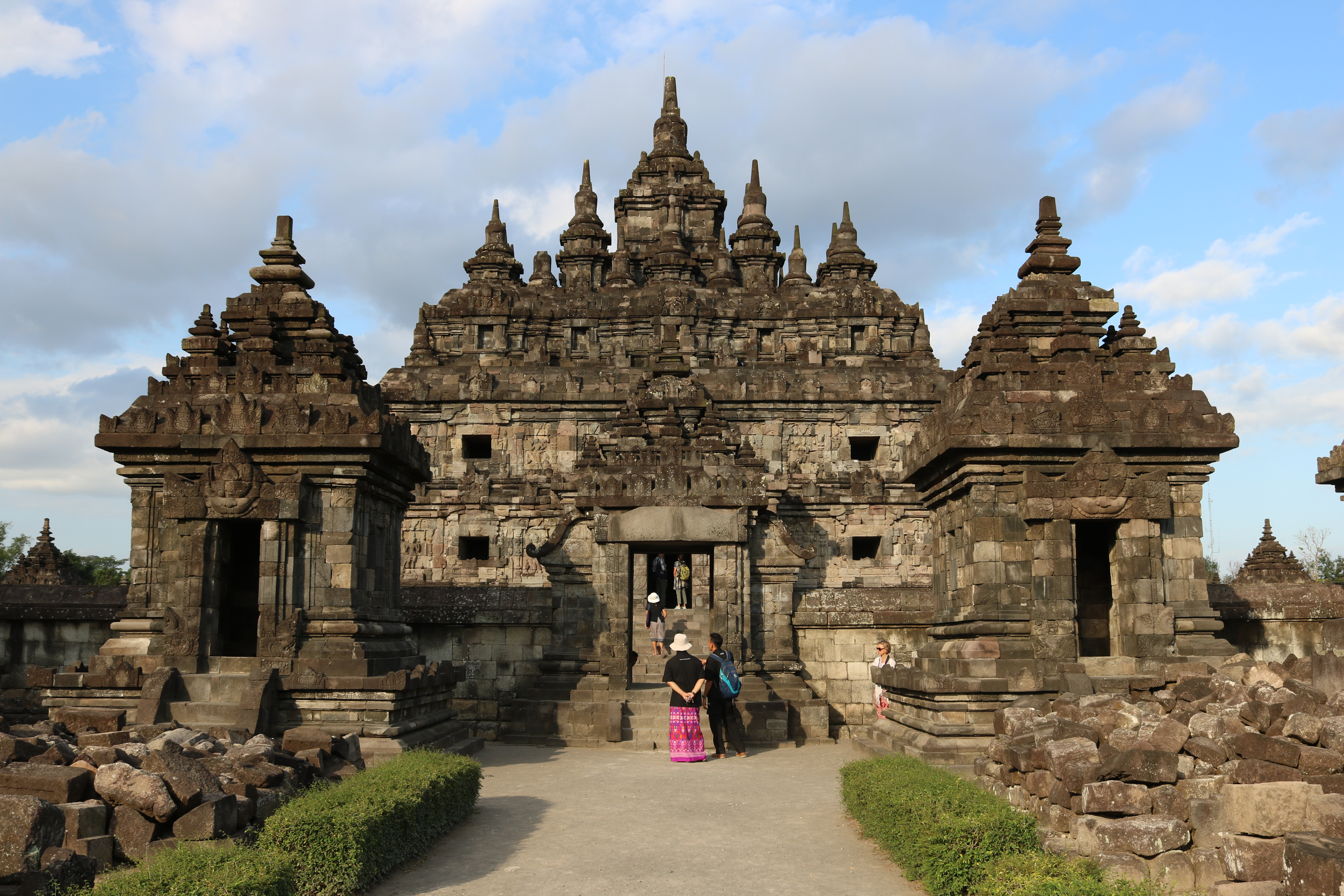
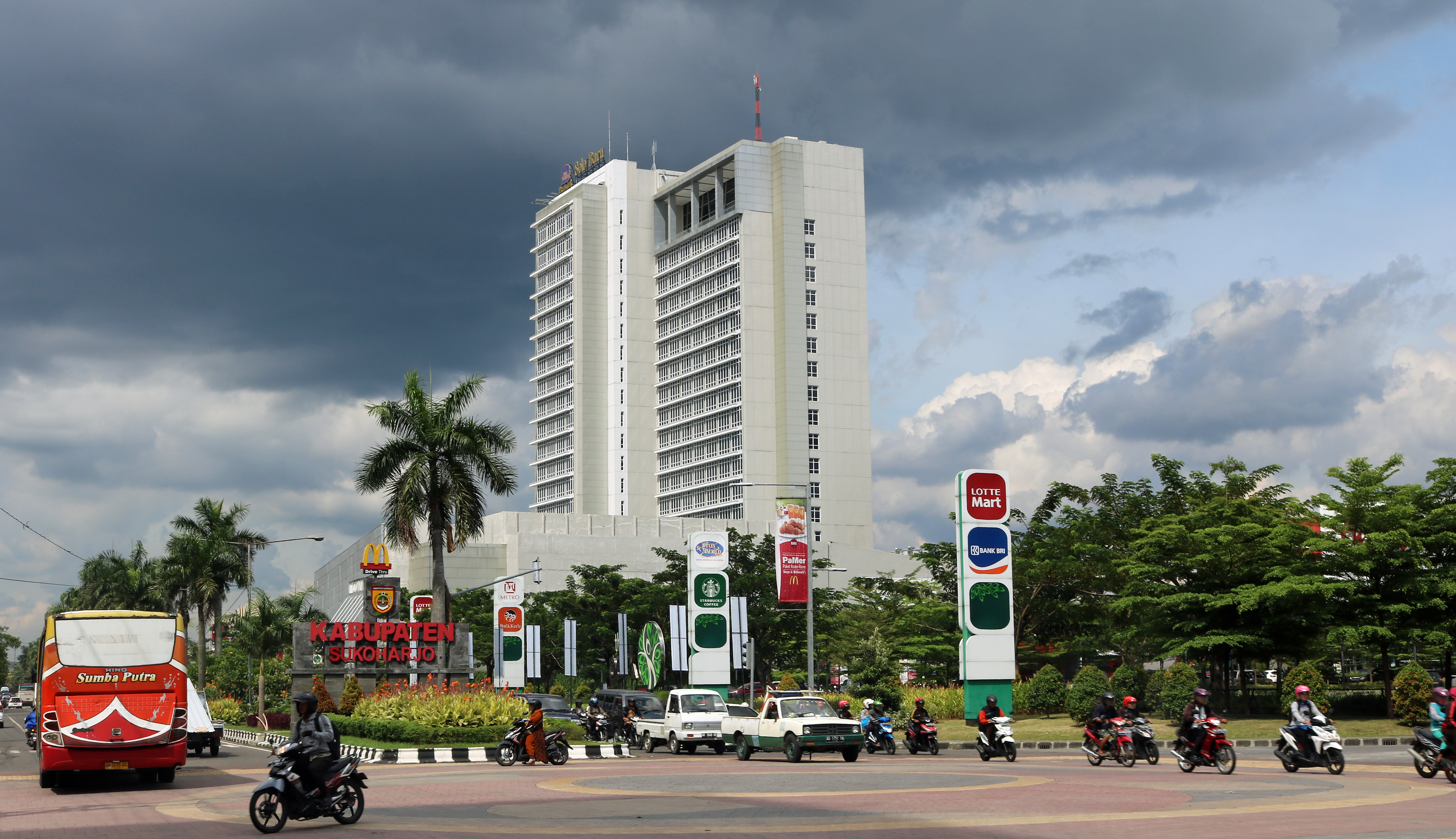
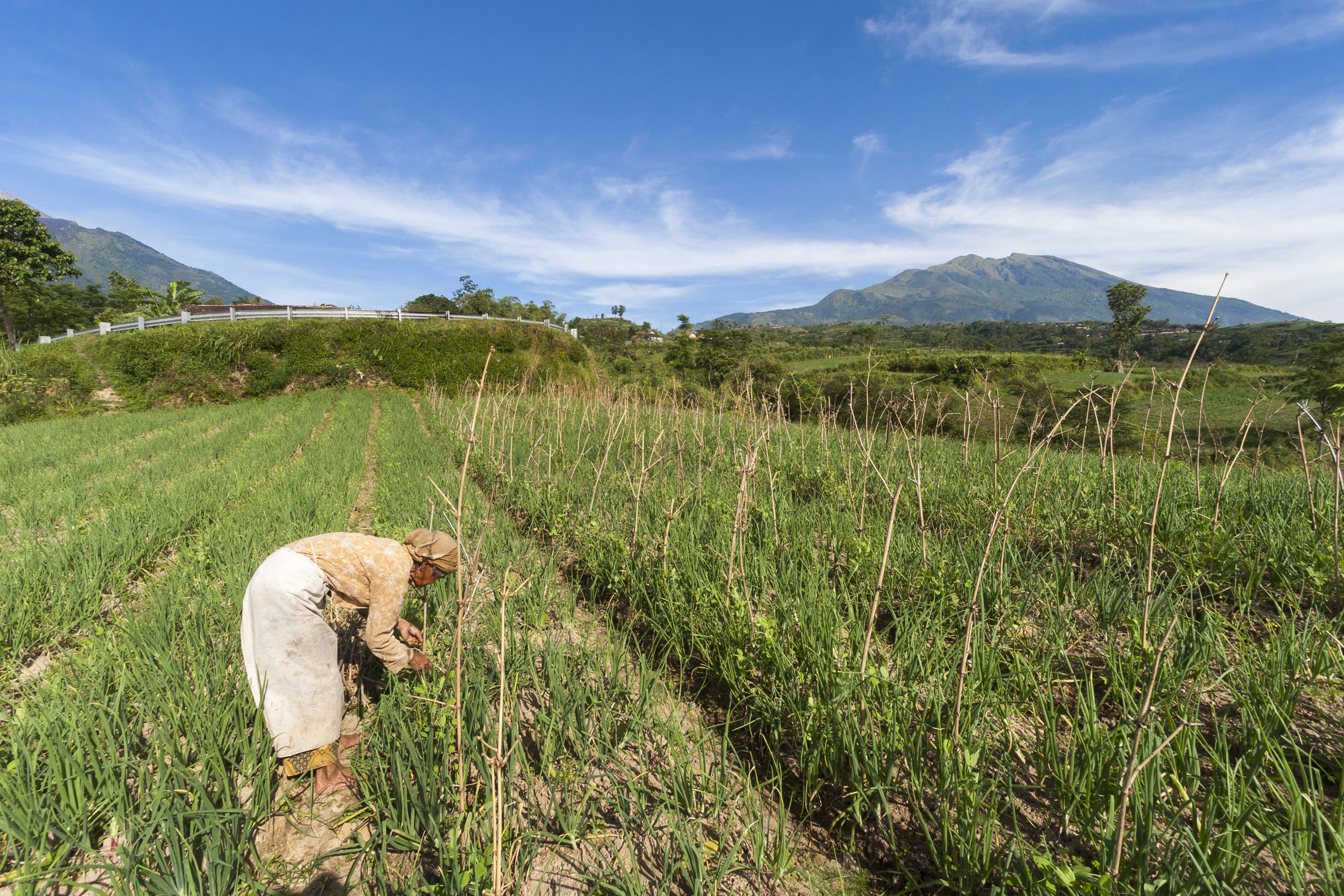
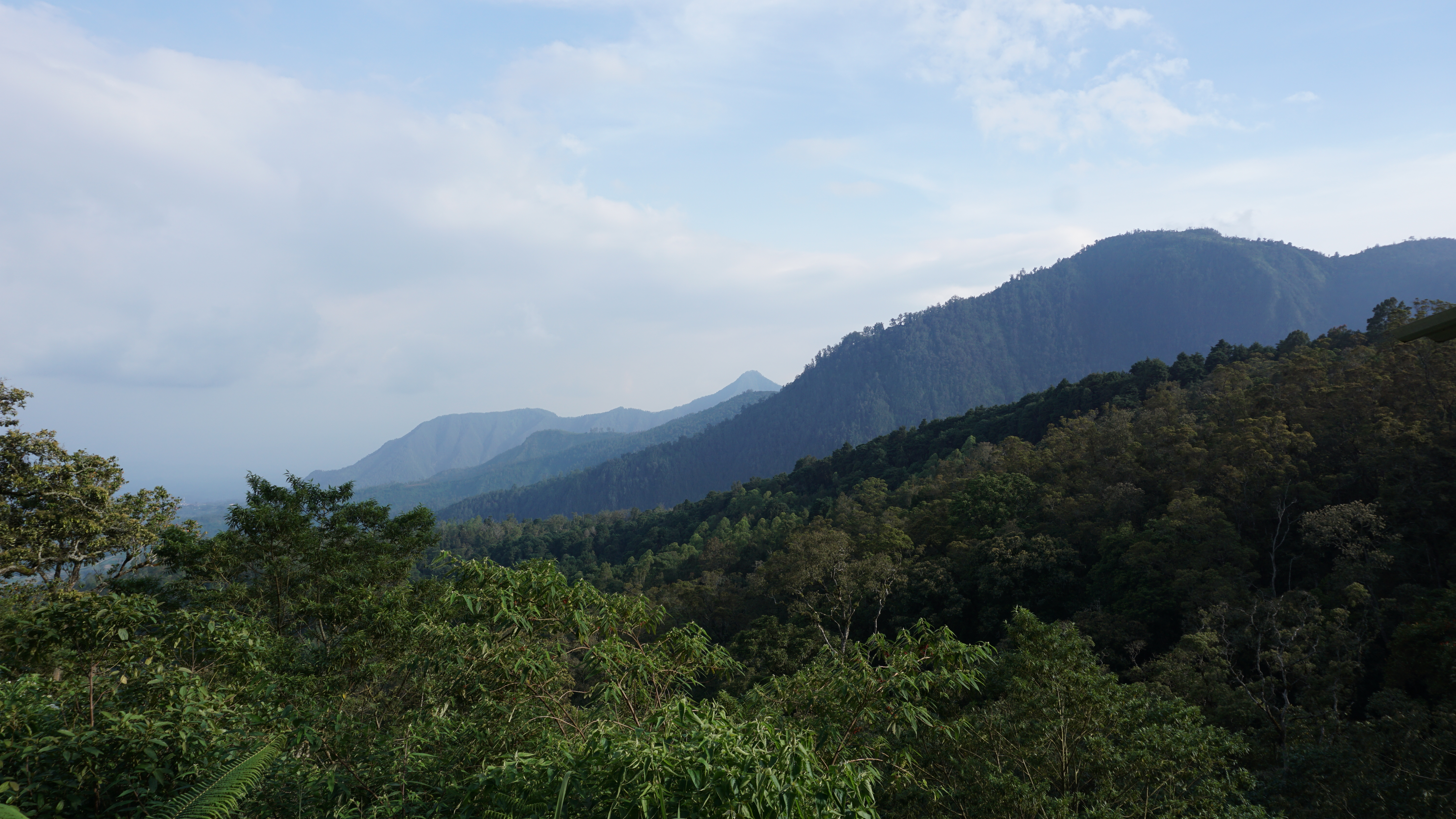
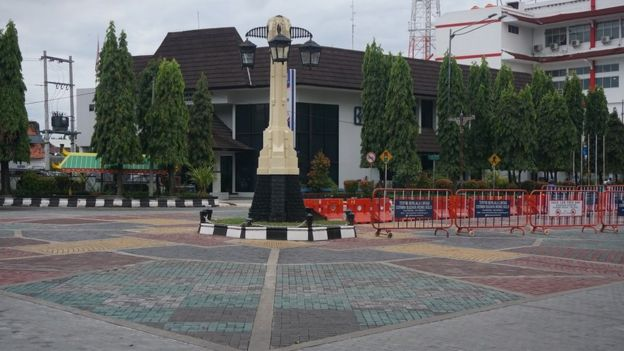
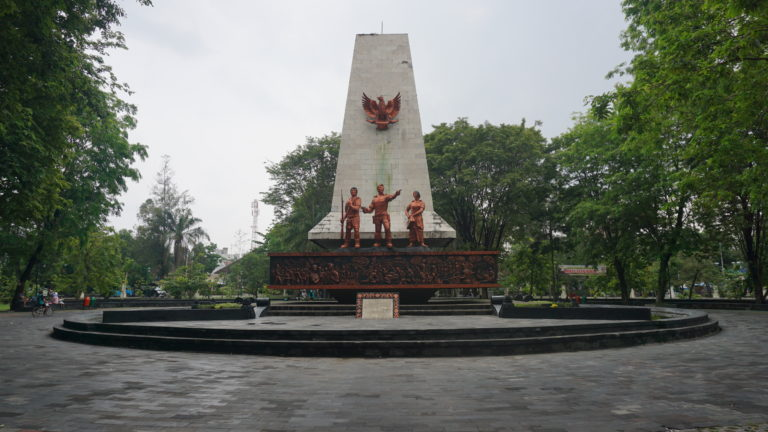
- Candi Plaosan Lor Sukoharjo Regency Agriculture at Mount Merapi Landscape in Tawangmangu-Plaosan Tugu Pemandengan General Attack Monument 4 Days Surakarta

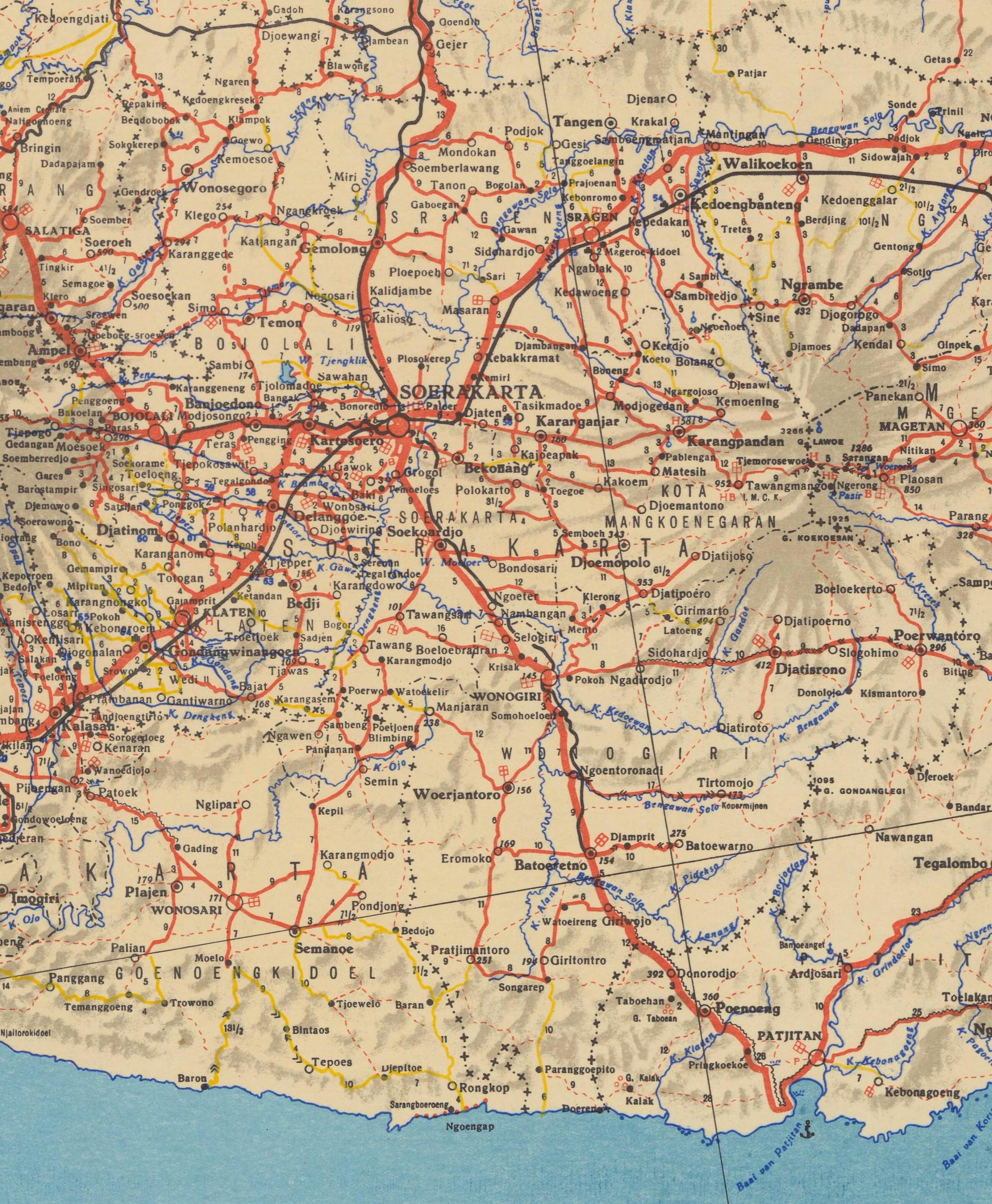
- 7°34′0″S 110°49′0″E
- Country: Indonesia
- Province: Central Java
- Core city: Surakarta
- Regencies: Sukoharjo Regency; Karanganyar Regency

Area
  - Metro: 1,343.30 km^{2} (518.65 sq mi)

Population (mid 2021 estimate)
  - Metro: 2,414,666
  - Metro density: 1,797.56/km^{2} (4,655.67/sq mi)
- Time zone: UTC+7 (Indonesia Western Time)
- GDP metro: 2023
- Total: ▲Rp 154.211 trillion ▲US$ 10.117 billion ▲US$ 32.402 billion (PPP)
- Per capita: ▲Rp 63.864 million ▲US$ 4,190 ▲US$ 13,419 (PPP)

The Surakarta metropolitan area or known locally as (Javanese: ꦱꦺꦴꦭꦺꦴꦫꦪ, romanized: Solo Raya) or Greater Solo is one of the metropolitan areas in Indonesia where the former Kerasidenan of Surakarta (Javanese: ꦏꦫꦺꦱꦶꦝꦺꦤꦤ꧀ꦱꦸꦫꦏꦂꦠ, romanized: Karésidhènan Surakarta) and the Special Region of Surakarta were established. This area includes the city of Surakarta and its buffer areas such as Sukoharjo Regency, Karanganyar Regency.

== History ==
=== Kingdom Period ===
The establishment of Surakarta began with the Geger Pacinan event in Batavia in the 1740s. The rebel prince assisted by ethnic Chinese attacked the Mataram Kartasura palace, causing the palace to be destroyed. Mataram, which was then led by Susuhunan Pakubuwono II, had to move the palace to another place. He chose Sala village to be used as the new government place.

=== Netherlands Colonial Period ===
Surakarta was formed from the combination of the Kasunanan and Mangkunagaran areas. The area includes the core area of Surakarta namely: Kawedanan Kasunanan, Kawedanan Kartasura, Kawedanan Larangan, Kawedanan Bekonang (Now part of Municipality of Surakarta & Sukoharjo Regency ), Karanganyar Regency including Banjarsari Solo sub-district, Sukowati Regency (now Sragen), Wonogiri Regency, Klaten Regency, Boyolali Regency. Surakarta and Mangkunagara were also included in the vorstenlanden, an autonomous region Netherlands East Indies where this region had the right to govern its own household.

=== Present ===
Central Java Regional Regulation No. 6 of 2010 concerning spatial and regional development plans for 2009–2039, stipulates Solo Raya (Subosukawonosraten) as a development area, with a development function as a Local, Provincial, National and International Service Center.

== Geography ==
Solo is in the central part of Java, within province of Central Java near Special Region of Yogyakarta.

== Economy ==
The economy of Solo raya agriculture commonly in Klaten Regency and Bantul Regency. However, urban activities such as higher education, trade, tourism, art and handicraft industries are sharply increase with focus on the city of Surakarta.

== Transportation ==
The map of Public Transport Map of Surakarta as per 2025.

Solo is served by Adisumarmo Airport. There are two main railway stations: Solo Balapan railway station and Solo Jebres railway station.

Solo is considered one of the major hubs that link the west–east main railway route in Java island. Solo Balapan Station is the main train station located in the center, and Selo Jebres Station is the second train station in the city. The two stations have their own schedule to and from other cities on Java island. The KAI Commuter Yogyakarta Line electric commuter rail system operates from Yogyakarta to Surakarta.

Since 2010, the government of Central Java launched a bus rapid transit system, the Batik Solo Trans, which connects places in and around Solo Raya, including the airport and Kartasyra Bus Terminal.

== Government and politics ==
Population density of Java and Madura by subdistrict as of 2022, with major urban areas shown

Solo raya is administered by one city government (city of Surakarta), and two regency governments such as.

Name	Capital	Area (km^{2})	Population 2000 Census	Population 2010 Census	Population 2020 Census	Population 2023 Estimate	HDI 2023
Surakarta City	Surakarta City	46.72	489,900	499,337	522,364	526,870	0.835 (Very High)
Sukoharjo Regency	Sukoharjo	493.53	780,949	824,238	907,587	932,680	0.787 (High)
Karanganyar Regency	Karanganyar	803.05	761,988	813,196	931,963	955,116	0.773 (High)
Total		1,343.30	2,032,837	2,136,771	2,361,914	2,414,666	0.792 (High)

The joint secretariate is organized into three management layers. The first layer consist of political executives representation from the city and both regencies. The second layer consist of group senior administrative officers from the city and both regencies. The third layer consists of technical officers. The joint secretariat also intended on managing infrastructure at cross-regional borders, which are (1) road infrastructure, (2) waste management, (3) transportation, (4) clean (drinking) water, (5) drainage and sewerage, and (6) spatial planning.

== See also ==
- List of metropolitan areas in Indonesia
- Jakarta metropolitan area
- Surabaya metropolitan area
- Bandung metropolitan area
- Padang metropolitan area
