= Solo Kota railway station =

Railway station in Indonesia

BK02 Solo Kota Station Stasiun Solo Kota
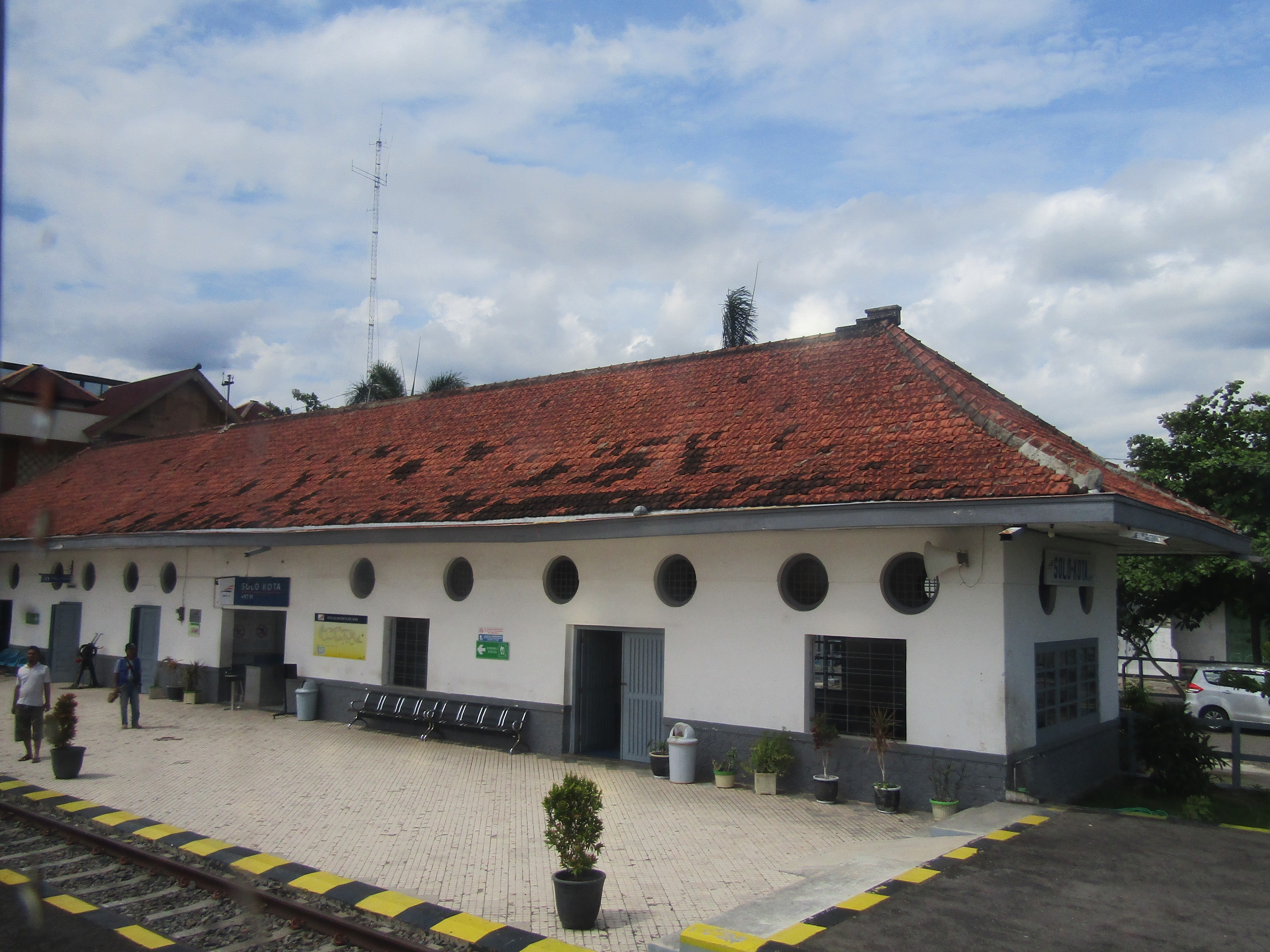
- Solo Kota Station

General information
- Other names: Sangkrah Station
- Location: Jl. Sungai Sambas, Sangkrah, Pasar Kliwon, Surakarta; Central Java; Indonesia
- Coordinates: 7.5756189°S 110.83633669999999°E
- Elevation: +97 m (318 ft)
- Owner: Kereta Api Indonesia
- Operator: Kereta Api Indonesia
- Line: Purwosari–Wonogiri
- Platforms: 1 side platform 2 island platforms
- Tracks: 3

Construction
- Structure type: Ground
- Parking: Available
- Accessible: Available

Other information
- Station code: STA
- Classification: Class III

History
- Opened: 1922

Services
Preceding station	Kereta Api Indonesia	Following station
Purwosari Terminus	Batara Kresna railbus	Sukoharjo towards Wonogiri
Location
- Location within Java

Solo Kota Station (also known as Sangkrah Station) is a railway station located in Sangkrah, Pasar Kliwon, Surakarta, Central Java, Indonesia. The station has three railway tracks.

== Services ==
The following is a list of train services at the Solo Kota Station

=== Passenger services ===
- Commuter
  - Bathara Kresna Rail Bus, destination of Purwosari and Wonogiri
- Tourist train
  - Sepur Kluthuk Jaladara, destination of Purwosari

== See also ==
Other railway stations in Surakarta:

- Purwosari railway station
- Solo Balapan railway station
- Solo Jebres railway station

Preceding station	Kereta Api Indonesia	Following station
Purwosari; Terminus	Purwosari–Wonogiri	Sukoharjo towards Wonogiri
