= Solo Balapan railway station =

Railway station in Indonesia

Y11 AS03 JS01 Solo Balapan Station Stasiun Solo Balapan
- Entrance of the station

General information
- Other names: Balapan Station
- Location: Jl. Wolter Monginsidi, Kestalan, Banjarsari, Surakarta; Central Java; Indonesia
- Coordinates: 7.5567545°S 110.8213985°E
- Elevation: +93 m (305 ft)
- System: Commuter, airport, and inter-city rail station
- Owner: Kereta Api Indonesia
- Operator: Kereta Api Indonesia; KAI Commuter
- Lines: Yogyakarta Line; Adisumarmo Airport Rail Link; Joglosemarkerto; Gundih–Solo Balapan–Yogyakarta; Solo Balapan–Kertosono
- Platforms: 10
- Tracks: 11
- Connections: Trans Jateng: 1; Batik Solo Trans: 2 4 6

Construction
- Structure type: Ground
- Parking: Available
- Accessible: Available
- Architect: Thomas Karsten

Other information
- Station code: SLO • 3130
- Classification: Large type A

History
- Opened: 10 February 1870; 156 years ago
- Rebuilt: 1927, 2021
- Original company: Nederlandsch-Indische Spoorweg Maatschappij
- Pre-nationalisation: Staatsspoorwegen

Services
Preceding station	Kereta Api Indonesia	Following station
Terminus	Purwosari–Solo Balapan	Purwosari Terminus
Purwosari towards Klaten	Adisumarmo Airport Rail Link	Kadipiro towards Adisoemarmo International Airport
Preceding station		Following station
Purwosari towards Yogyakarta	Yogyakarta Line	Solo Jebres towards Palur
Location
- Location within Java

Solo Balapan Station (also known as Balapan Station, station code SLO) is a major railway station in Surakarta, Central Java, Indonesia. The name "Balapan" is taken from the name of a village which is located to the north of the station. The station is located on the railway line that connects the cities of Bandung, Jakarta, Surabaya, and Semarang. Solo Balapan Station is the largest station in Surakarta and Central Java.

== History ==
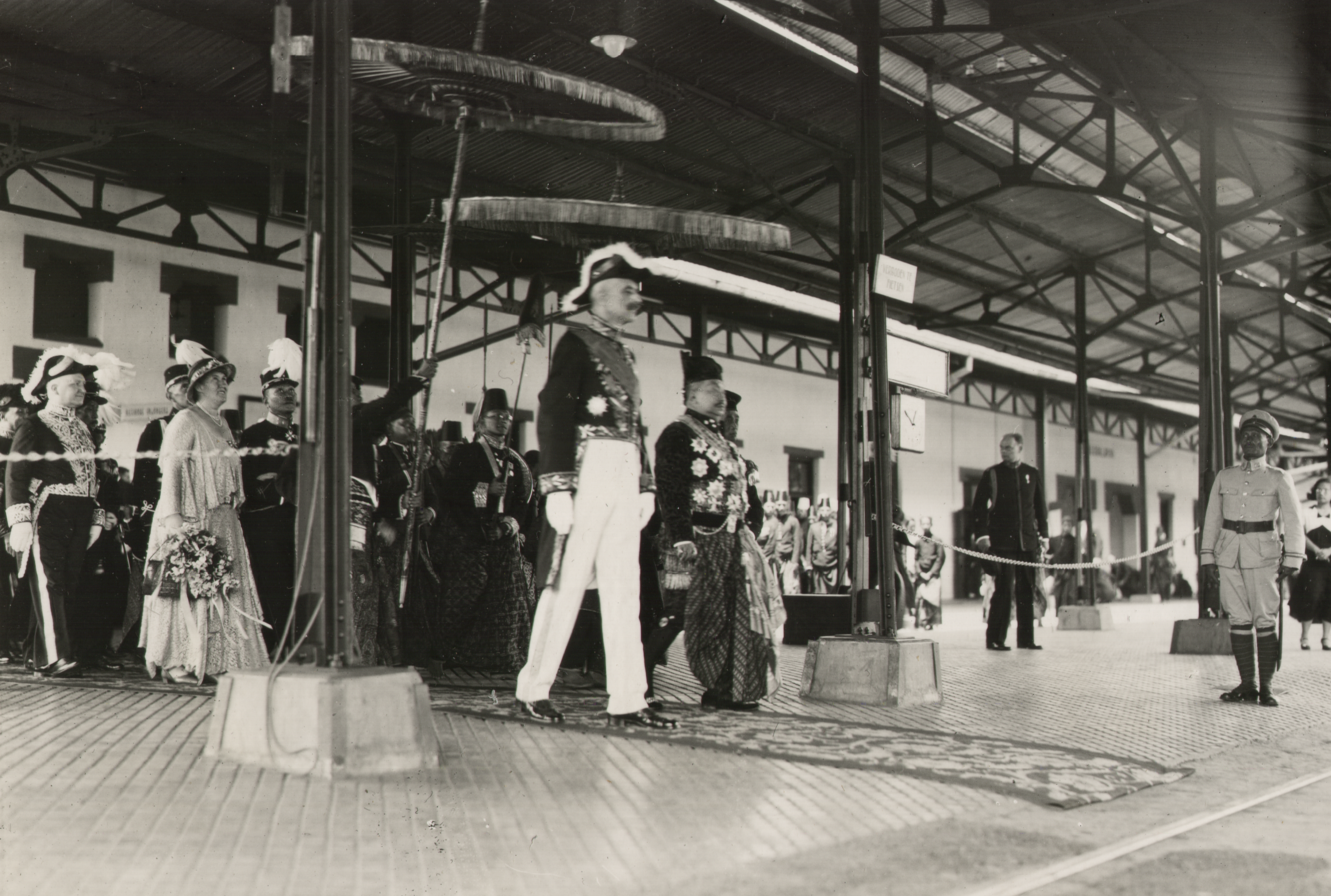
Governor General B.C. de Jonge arrived at Balapan Station and welcomed by Pakubuwana X

Solo Balapan Station is one of the oldest major stations in Indonesia (after Samarang NIS), built by the first Dutch East Indies railway company, Nederlandsch-Indische Spoorweg Maatschappij (NIS) in the 19th century, namely during the reign of Mangkunegara IV and is located in the territory of the Duchy of Praja Mangkunegaran. The major station in Surakarta for the Surakarta Sunanate and Staatsspoorwegen areas is Solo Jebres Station.

This station was built on the equestrian owned by Mangkunegaran. As a substitute, the Mangkunegaran received land in Manahan from the Kasunanan to build horse racing facilities and other sports activities.

The laying of the first stone took place in 1864, enlivened by a ceremony which was attended by Mangkunegara IV and invited the Governor General of the Dutch East Indies, Baron van de Beele. This station was opened on 10 February 1870 simultaneously with the opening of the Kedungjati–Gundih–Solo line, previously the Gundih–Solo line was planned to open on 1 September 1869. The next line, namely the Ceper–Solo line, was opened on 27 March 1871. The construction of all railway lines planned for NIS, Samarang–Vorstenlanden and Kedungjati–Ambarawa was completed and inaugurated on 21 May 1873.

In 1927, a building to the south of the station was built with Javanese-influenced architecture with a three-story roof. This is in line with the construction of the Staatsspoorwegen double track which is parallel to the NIS Solo-Yogyakarta railway line. The construction of the south side of the station building was designed by Herman Thomas Karsten, a well-known Indisch architect.

This station is the second train station in Indonesia that uses an electric signaling system after Bandung Station in 1972, produced by Siemens and given the DrS60 series. The signal was then replaced by the latest signal produced by Len Industri in October 2020.

== Building and layout ==
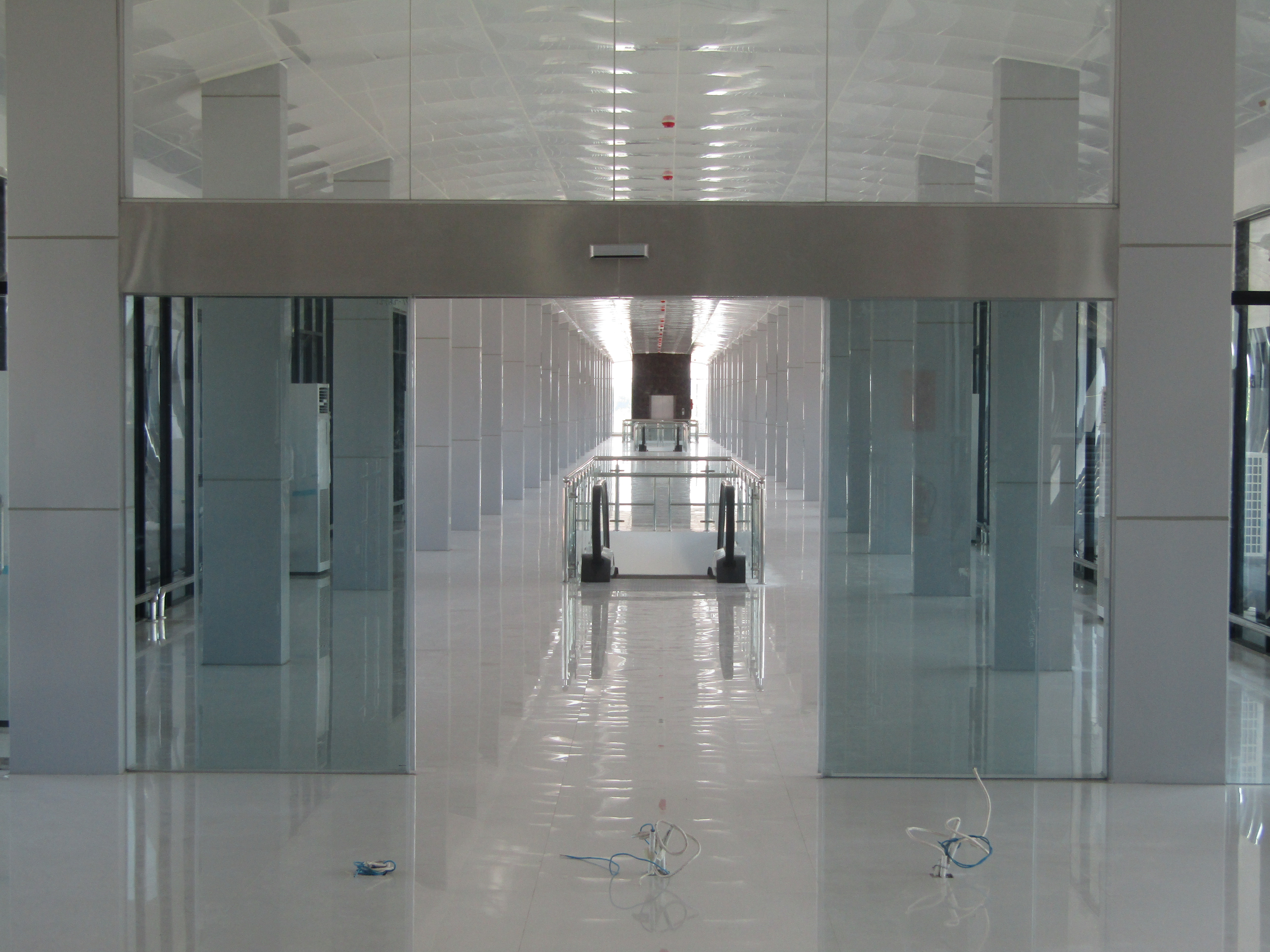
The door to the airport rail link waiting room at Solo Balapan Station

Initially, Solo Balapan Station had twelve railway lines which were divided into two emplacements. The south emplacement has five lanes with line 4 being a straight line to and from Yogyakarta and line 5 being a straight train to and from Madiun, while the north emplacement has seven lanes with line 7 being a straight train to and from Semarang. After the Solo-Yogyakarta double-track was operated in 2007, line 4 was used as a double-track straight line from Yogyakarta, while line 5 was used as a double-track straight line to Yogyakarta as well as a single track highway to and from Madiun. Then, after the double track to Solo Jebres is operational as of 7 October 2020, line 4 is used as a straight line towards Madiun, while line 5 is used as a straight line towards Yogyakarta.

The southern emplacement is generally used for intercity passenger train services, and the Yogyakarta–Solo Commuter Train, while the northern emplacement is for goods train services and departures for Adisoemarmo Airport Rail Link and Joglosemarkerto local trains. To the east, there are two major rail lines: north to Semarang and east to Surabaya. The northern emplacement has cement loading and unloading facilities.

On the east side of the station there is a rail wye which allows the train series to completely reverse direction using the shunt principle. The sides of this inverting triangle also allow trains from the east (from Solo Jebres Station) to go directly north (Semarang) without entering Solo Balapan Station or vice versa. Near this inverting triangle, there used to be a branch route to the Pertamina Gilingan Fuel Depot, which is also part of the side of this inverting triangle. The branch line has now been completely dismantled because it was affected by the construction of the double track to Solo Jebres Station. On the west side of the station there is a locomotive and train depot.

Currently, it is also equipped with a passenger crossing bridge to the east of the station which is directly connected to the road around the Tirtonadi Bus Terminal—functioning as an intermodal link so that train passengers can continue their journey by bus or vice versa.

After the new railway line to Adisumarmo International Airport was completed, the station underwent an overhaul on its northern platform. Therefore, the old line 9 has been demolished and a new building has been built on it which functions as a waiting room as well as a platform. The new building for airport train services has an area of 200 m² with two floors; can accommodate 200 passengers, and is connected to the existing distribution bridge. On 29 December 2019, the airport train waiting room was officially fully operational after the route to the airport was completed.

Regarding the electrification of the Yogyakarta–Solo commuter rail project, there is an EMU (KRL in Indonesian) stabling depot near the west side of the station emplacement. In addition, the track layout at this station was overhauled. The old line 3 has been dismantled for the expansion of the island platform so that now there are only ten lines at this station and there are four additional lines for KRL stabling. The electrification project has now been resumed to the east until it reaches Palur Station.

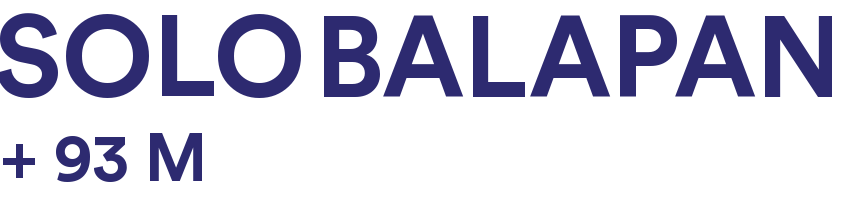
Y11 AS03
2nd floor
KAI Commuter and Airport Rail Link ticket locket and access to Tirtonadi bus terminal via skyway
North side
Line 10
Train parking
Line 9
Shutter path
Line 8
← (Purwosari) Adisumarmo Airport Rail Link to Klaten
Airport rail link departure building
Line 7
Adisumarmo Airport Rail Link to Adisoemarmo International Airport (Kadipiro) →

Straight tracks to Yogyakarta

Island platform
Line 6
Central Java–Yogyakarta local train departures and arrivals

Straight tracks from Yogyakarta

Island platform
Line 5
← (Purwosari) Yogyakarta Line to Yogyakarta

Central Java–Yogyakarta local train departures and arrivals from the west via Gundih

Side platform, the doors are opened on the right side of the train arrival from the west

Central building (NIS) (for KAI Commuter and local train departures only)
South Side
Side platform, the doors are opened on the left side of the train arrival from the west
Line 4
← (Purwosari) Yogyakarta Line to Yogyakarta and Palur (Solo Jebres) →

Straight tracks from Madiun

Line 3
Inter-city train derarture and arrival from the east

Straight tracks to Madiun

Island platform, the doors are opened on the left side of the train arrival from the east
Line 2
Inter-city train derarture and arrival
Line 1
Inter-city train derarture and arrival from the west
Side platform, the doors are opened on the right side of the train arrival from the west
G
Main building (for inter-city departures only)

== Services ==
The following is a list of train services at the Solo Balapan Station.

=== Intercity trains ===
==== Executive Class ====
- Argo Wilis, to Bandung via Yogyakarta-Tasikmalaya and to Surabaya Gubeng via Madiun-Jombang
- Argo Lawu, to and from Gambir via Yogyakarta-Purwokerto-Cirebon
- Argo Dwipangga, to and from Gambir via Yogyakarta-Purwokerto-Cirebon
- Gajayana, to Gambir via Yogyakarta-Purwokerto-Cirebon and to Malang via Madiun-Blitar
- Bima & Argo Semeru, to Gambir via Yogyakarta-Purwokerto-Cirebon and to Surabaya Gubeng via Madiun-Jombang
- Turangga, to Bandung via Yogyakarta-Tasikmalaya and to Surabaya Gubeng via Madiun-Jombang
- Manahan to Gambir

==== Mixed Class ====
- Fajar and Senja Utama Solo, to and from Pasar Senen via Yogyakarta-Purwokerto-Cirebon (executive class and premium economy class)
- Lodaya, to and from Bandung via Yogyakarta-Tasikmalaya (executive class and premium economy class)
- Sancaka, to Yogyakarta and to Surabaya Gubeng via Madiun-Jombang (executive class and premium economy class)
- Bangunkarta, to Pasar Senen via Yogyakarta-Purwokerto-Cirebon and to Jombang via Madiun (executive class and economy plus class)
- Malabar, to Bandung via Yogyakarta-Tasikmalaya and to Malang via Madiun-Blitar (executive class, business class, and economy plus class)
- Mutiara Selatan, to Bandung via Yogyakarta-Tasikmalaya and to Surabaya Gubeng via Madiun-Jombang (executive class and premium economy class)
- Kertanegara, to Purwokerto via Yogyakarta and to Malang via Madiun-Blitar (executive class and economy plus class)
- Malioboro Express, to Yogyakarta and to Malang via Madiun-Blitar (executive class and economy plus class)
- Ranggajati, to Cirebon via Yogyakarta-Purwokerto and to Jember via Madiun-Jombang-Surabaya Gubeng (executive class and business class)
- Wijayakusuma, to Cilacap via Yogyakarta and to Jember via Surabaya Gubeng (executive class and premium economy class)
- Sancaka Utara, to Surabaya Pasar Turi and to Kutoarjo (executive class and business class)
- Batavia train to Gambir (executive and economy)
- Mataram, to Pasar Senen
- Madiun Jaya, from and to Pasar Senen and to Madiun
- Sangkuriang, from and to Bandung and to Ketapang
- Banyubiru from and to Semarang Tawang (Executive and Economy)

==== Premium Economy Class ====
- Jayakarta Premium, to Pasar Senen via Lempuyangan-Purwokerto and to Surabaya Gubeng via Madiun

==== Economy Plus Class ====
- Joglosemarkerto, loop line through Central Java and the Special Region of Yogyakarta via Purwokerto and Semarang Tawang

=== Commuter rail and airport rail link ===
- Yogyakarta Line, to Yogyakarta and Palur
- Adisumarmo Airport Rail Link, to Klaten and Adisumarmo International Airport

== Supporting transportation ==
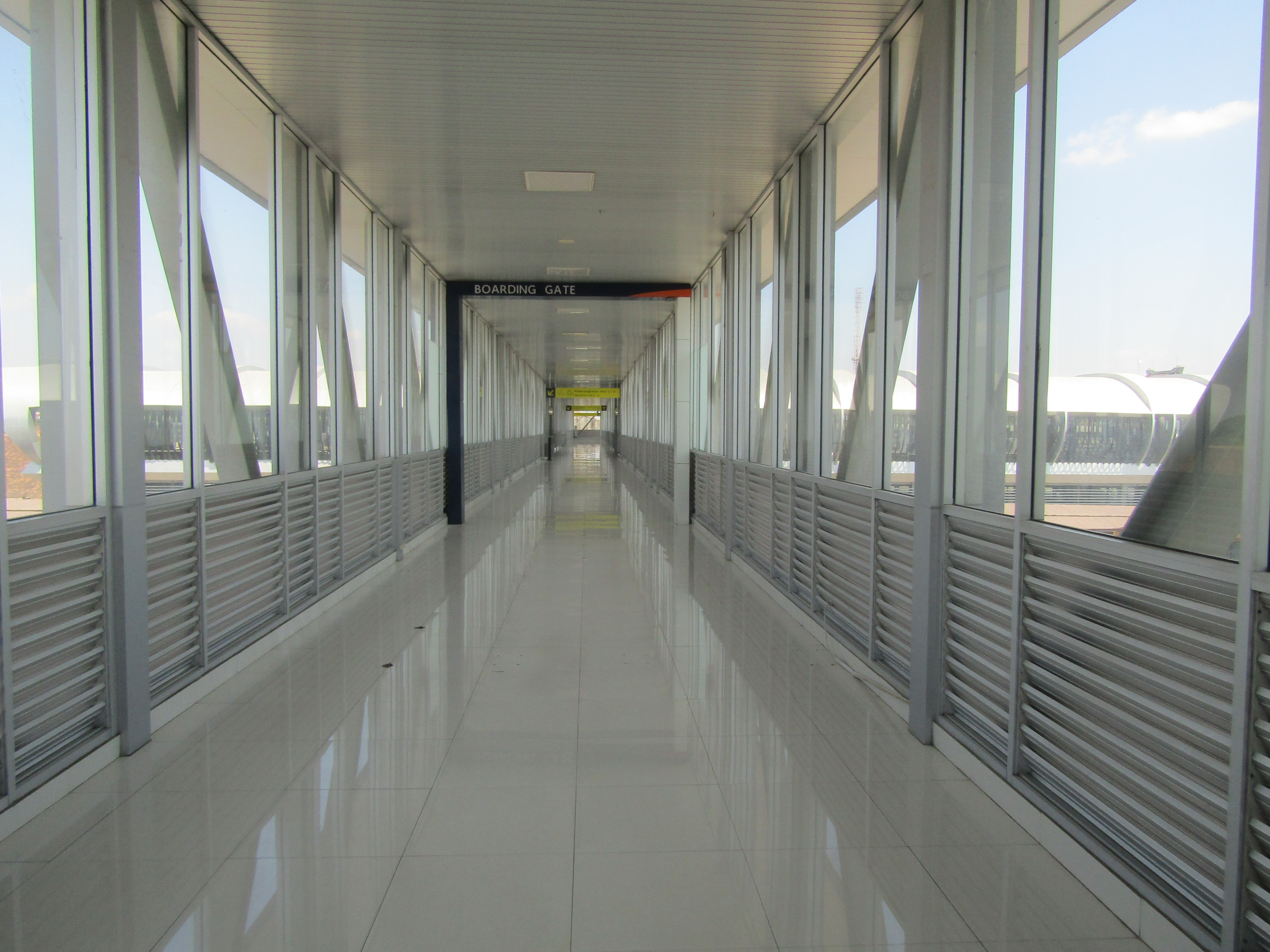
Inside a skybridge connecting Solo Balapan Station with Tirtonadi Bus Terminal

The Balapan bus stops of Batik Solo Trans is located near Solo Balapan Station, serving Corridor 2 and 6.

To the east of the station is a skybridge that directly connects the station with Tirtonadi Bus Terminal, making it easier for train passengers to continue their journey by bus or vice versa. Tirtonadi Bus Terminal is currently serving intercity buses to destinations across Java and Sumatra, as well as Corridors 4, 7FS, and 11FS of Batik Solo Trans and Corridor S1 of Trans Jateng BRT.

Type	Route	Destination
Batik Solo Trans	K2S	Kerten–Palur
Batik Solo Trans	K6S	Tirtonadi–Solo Baru
Batik Solo Trans	7FS	Ngipang–Pasar Klewer
Trans Jateng	1	Tirtonadi bus terminal–Sumberlawang

== In popular culture ==
The station became an inspiration for one of the most popular campursari songs in the 1990s from Didi Kempot Setasiun Balapan. For his work on about the station, PT Kereta Api Indonesia officially appointed Didi Kempot as a "railway ambassador" after the Indo pop music group ST 12.

== Incidents ==
- On 11 January 2019, glass panel walls and part of the steel frame of the bridge connecting the Tirtonadi Terminal and Solo Balapan Station broke due to the heavy rain and strong winds that hit Surakarta. There were no casualties in this incident, but the bridge could not be used to change modes of passengers until the next day.

== Gallery ==
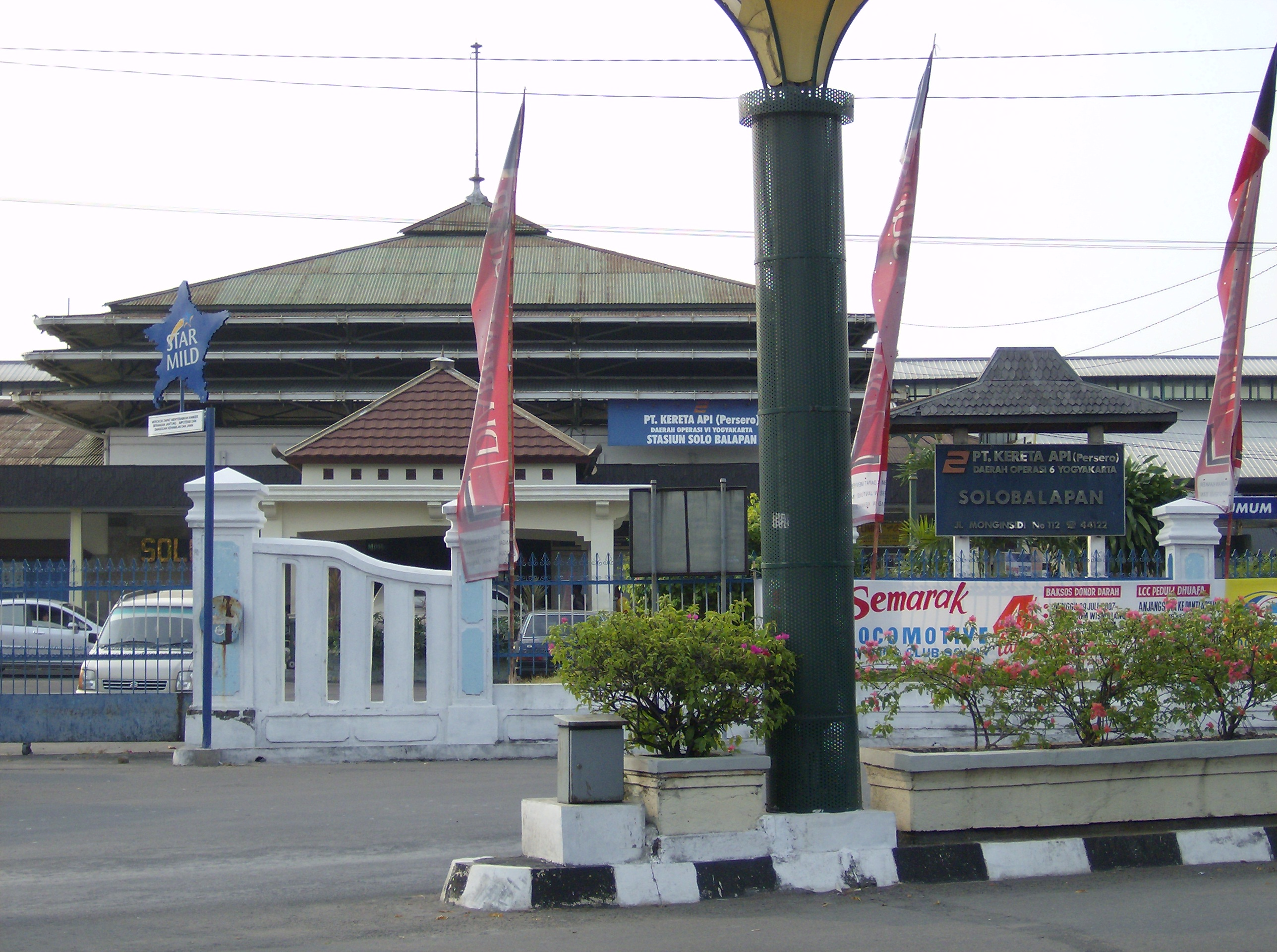
The entrance gate of the station

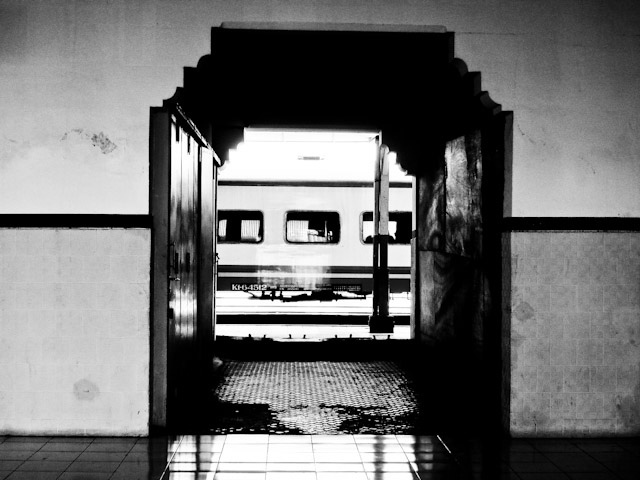
The entrance hallway of the station

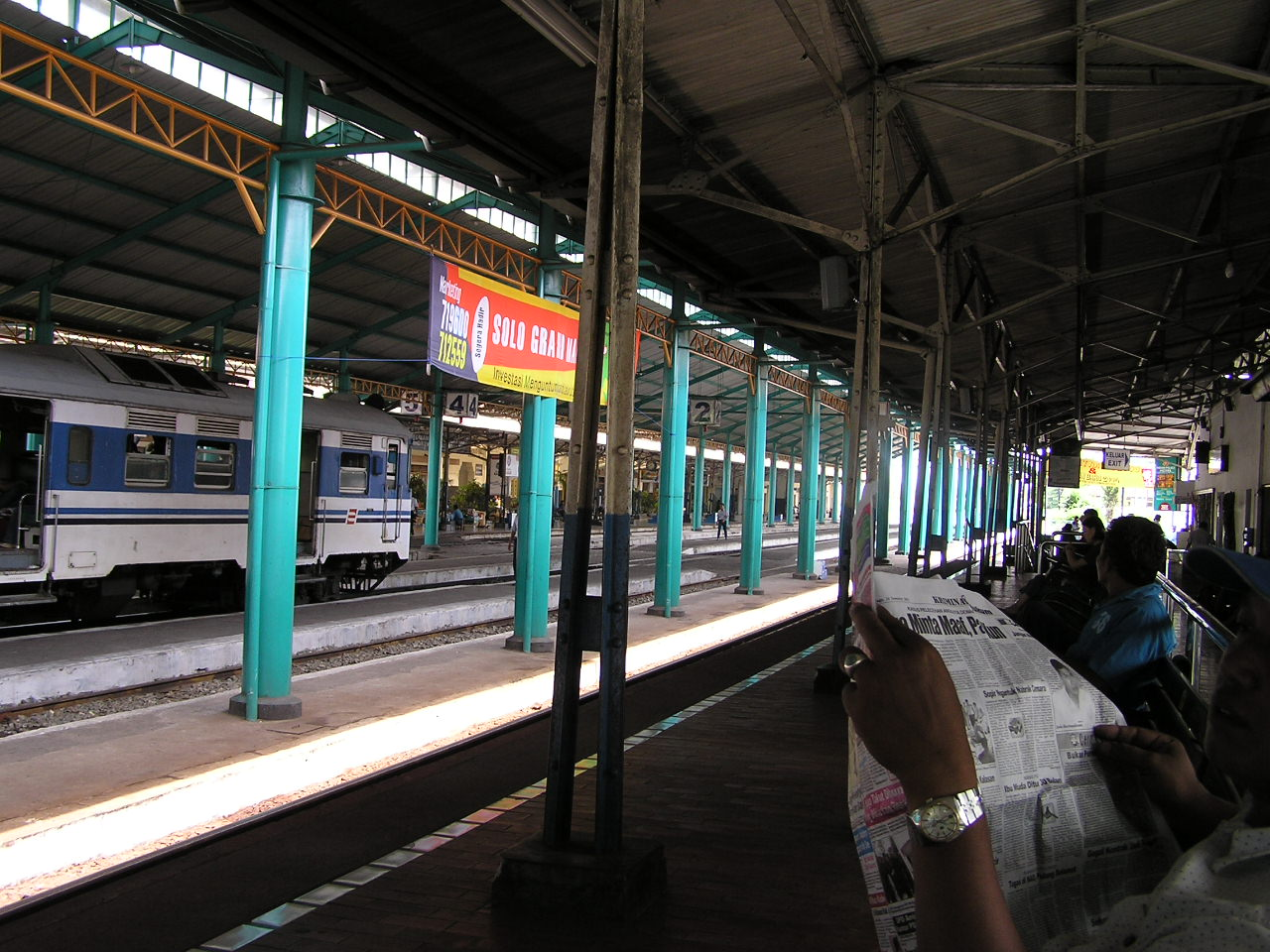
The platform and the building that separates the north and south side of the station with the Prambanan Express train on the left (2003)

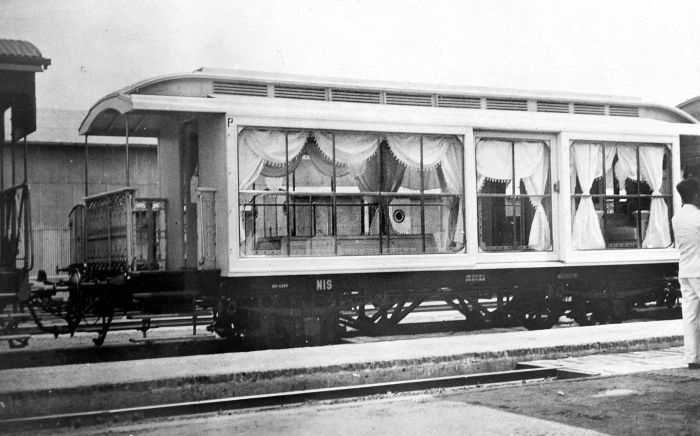
The train car which was used by Pakubuwono X arrived at the station

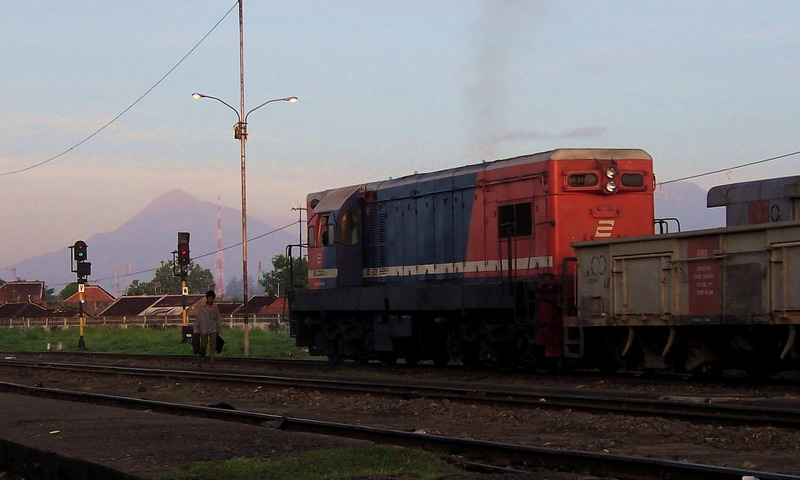
BB 200-03 locomotive waiting for departure signal at the station. Mount Merapi is visible at the background, while Mount Merbabu is hindered by the locomotive

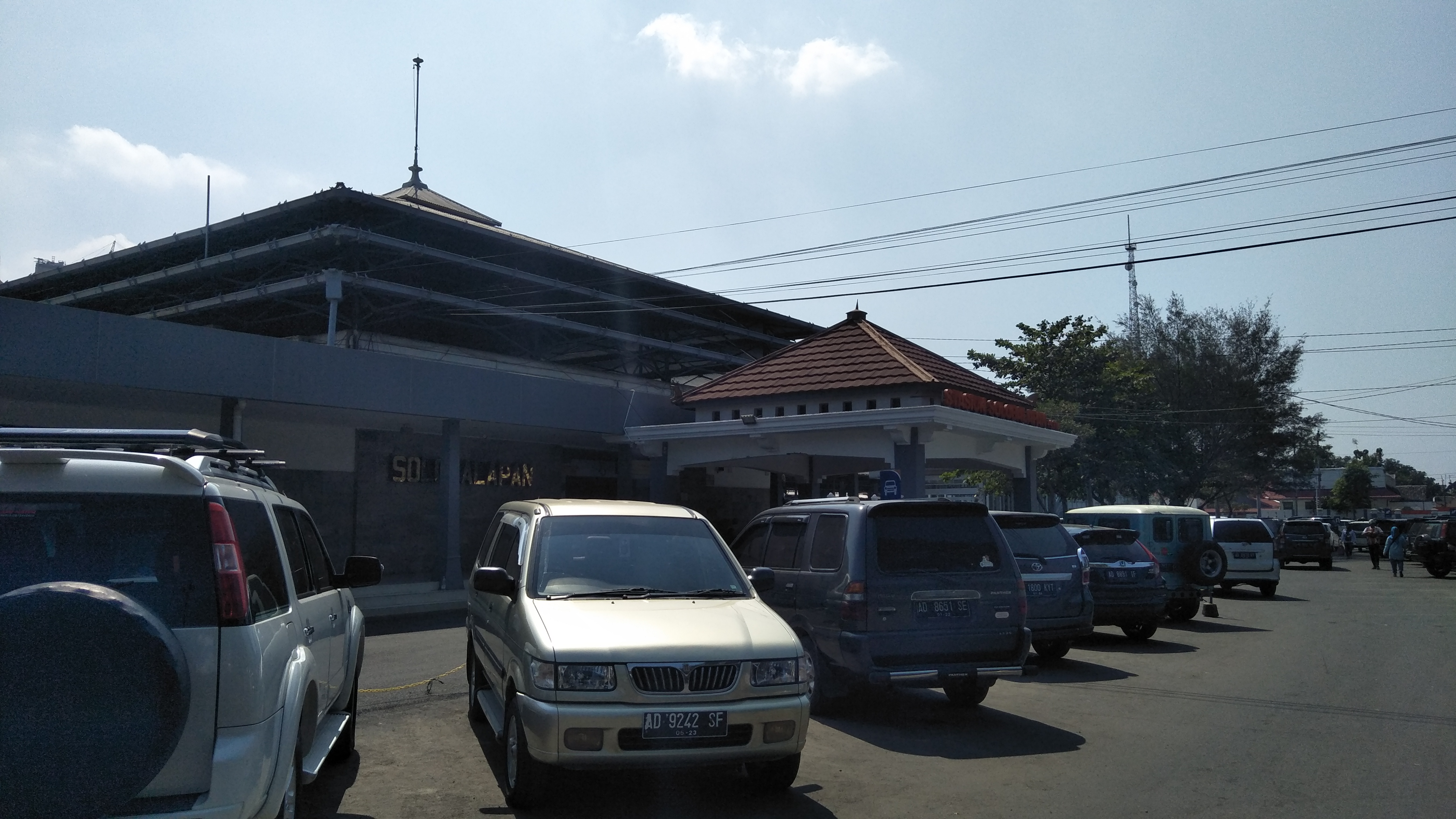
The front view and the parking area of the station (2019)

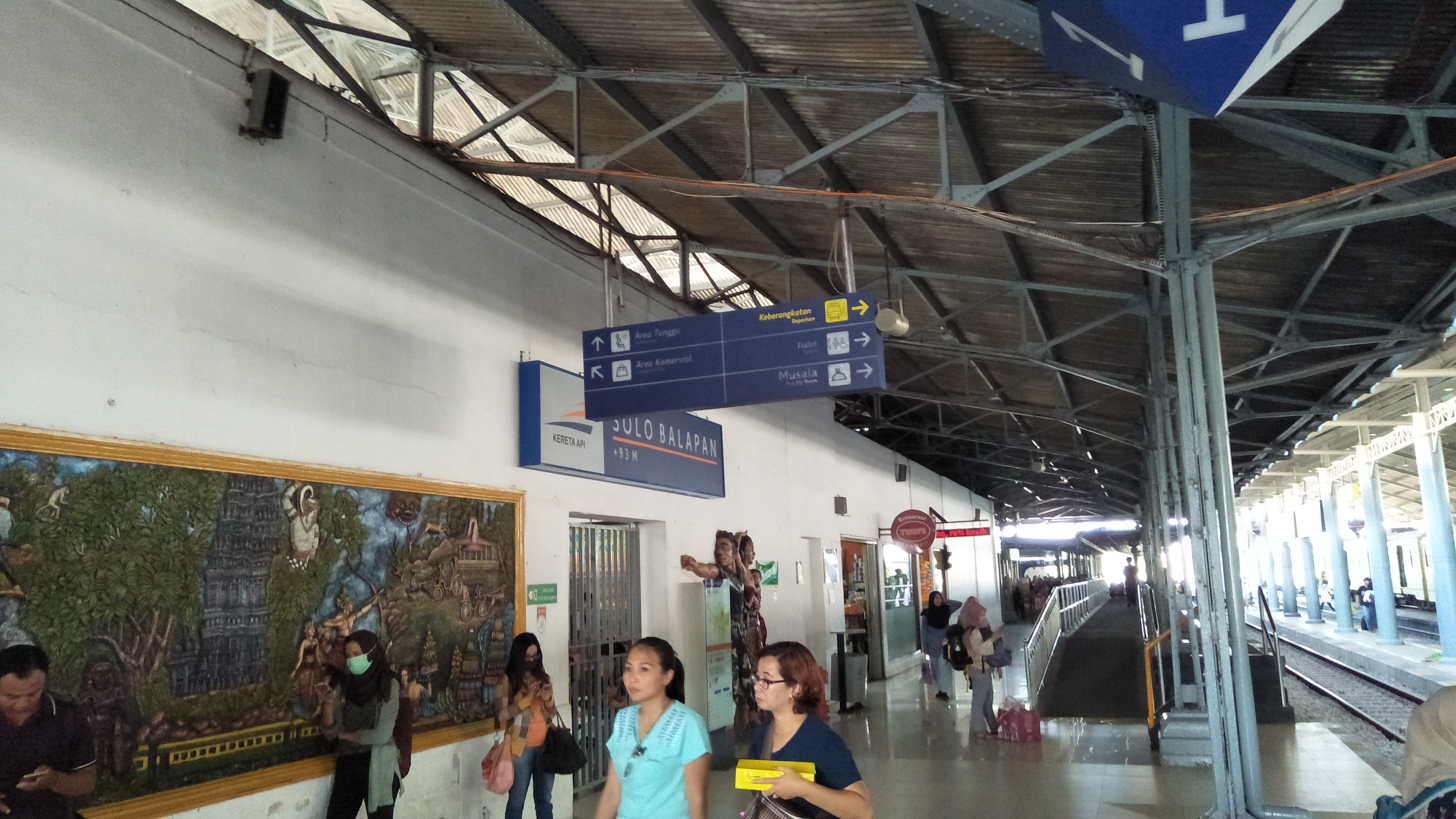
The interior of the station

== See also ==
Other railway stations in Surakarta:

- Purwosari railway station
- Solo Jebres railway station
- Solo Kota railway station

Preceding station	Kereta Api Indonesia	Following station
Kadipiro towards Gundih	Gundih–Solo Balapan	Terminus
Terminus	Solo Balapan–Kertosono	Solo Jebres towards Kertosono
Purwosari; Terminus	PWS–SLO	Terminus
