= Adisoemarmo International Airport =

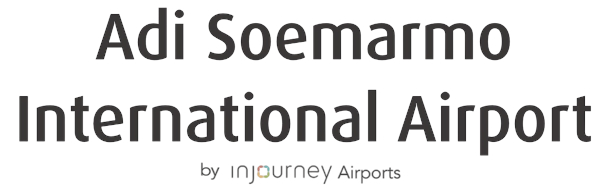

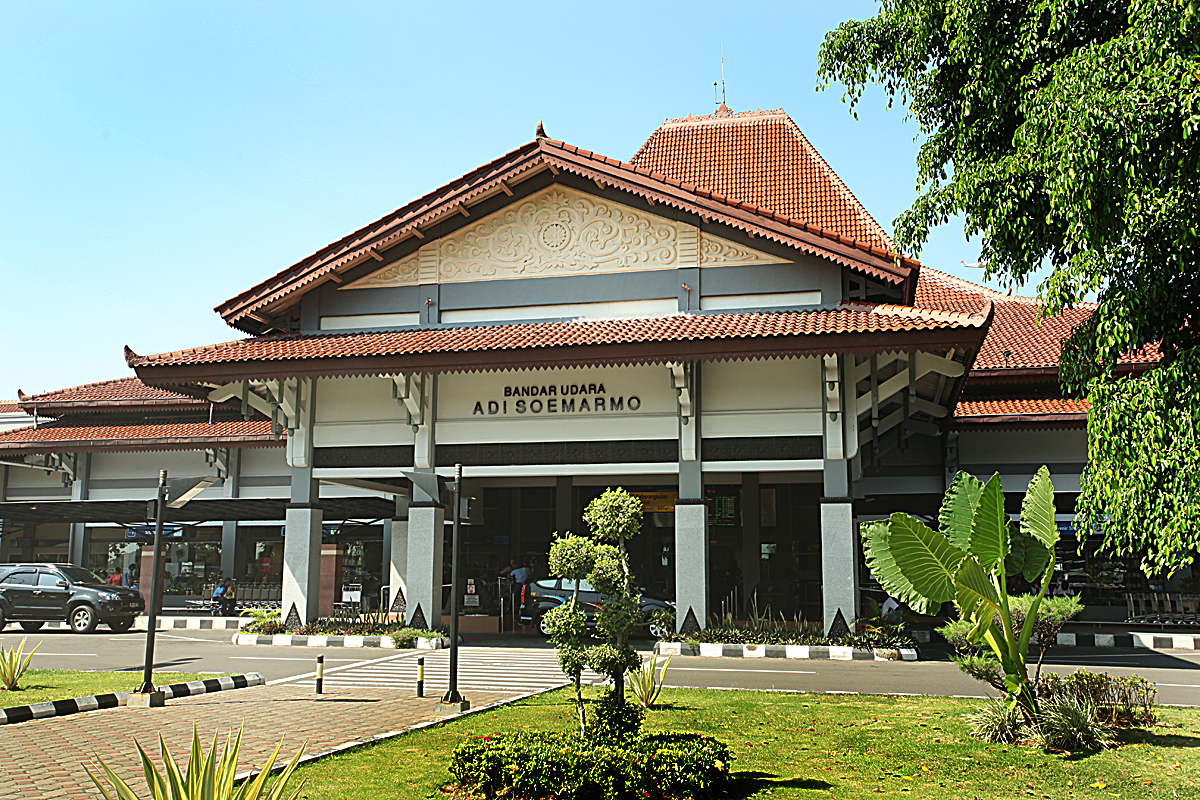
- IATA: SOC; ICAO: WAHQ; WMO: 96845

Summary
- Airport type: Public / Military
- Owner: Government of Indonesia
- Operator: InJourney Airports
- Serves: Surakarta Metropolitan Area, Central Java and Ngawi Regency, East Java
- Location: Boyolali Regency, Central Java, Indonesia
- Opened: 23 April 1974; 52 years ago
- Built: 1940; 86 years ago
- Time zone: WIB (UTC+07:00)
- Elevation AMSL: 128 m / 419 ft
- Coordinates: 07°30′58″S 110°45′25″E
- Website: www.adisumarmo-airport.com

Maps
- Java region in Indonesia

- Location in Central Java, Indonesia SOC/WAHQ (Indonesia)

Runways
Direction	Length		Surface
Direction	m	ft	Surface
08/26	2,600	8,530	Asphalt

Statistics (2024)
- Passengers: 1,120,010 (▼8.9%)
- Cargo (tonnes): 4,012 (▲31.4%)
- Aircraft movements: 8,722 (▼0.8%)
- Source: DGCA

Adisoemarmo International Airport (IATA: SOC, ICAO: WAHQ) is an international airport serving Surakarta, the second-largest city in Central Java, Indonesia, as well as the surrounding areas. The airport is actually not located within Surakarta's city limits; it is situated in Boyolali Regency, approximately 14 km north of downtown Surakarta. It serves as the primary airport for Surakarta, as well as the broader Greater Solo region. The airport is named after Adi Soemarmo Wirjokusumo (1921–1947), an Indonesian Air Force officer and national hero of Indonesia. Adisumarmo Airport primarily offers flights to Jakarta, with additional services to other major cities such as Denpasar. The airport previously operated international routes to Kuala Lumpur and Singapore, but these were suspended due to the COVID-19 pandemic. Owing to the continued absence of regular international traffic, its international status was officially revoked in 2024, before being reinstated the following year.

In addition to functioning as a commercial airport, the airport also hosts Adisoemarmo Air Force Base, a Type A facility of the Indonesian Air Force. While the base does not serve as the home station for any combat squadrons, it operates primarily as a training center for future Air Force cadets. The base is also responsible for overseeing air defense operations in Surakarta and the surrounding region.

== History ==
=== Colonial era ===
The airport was formerly known as Panasan Airfield, named after the village where it is located. The name Panasan is derived from Javanese and refers to an open area or field that becomes hot under intense sunlight, making it a common site for local residents to dry goods (mepe). The airbase was constructed by the Dutch colonial government in 1940 as part of the Royal Netherlands East Indies Army Air Force’s preparations for a potential Japanese invasion of the Dutch East Indies—an invasion that eventually occurred in 1942. At the time of the Japanese advance, the base remained incomplete and was not yet fully operational. To prevent it from falling intact into enemy hands, the Dutch employed a scorched-earth strategy and attempted to destroy key facilities. During the subsequent Japanese occupation (1942–1945), the airbase was completed and further developed by the Japanese, who inherited an asphalt runway approximately 1,000 meters in length, along with offices, a headquarters, hangars, and other support infrastructure—some of which had been damaged by the Dutch. Under Japanese control, the base was operated by the Imperial Japanese Navy Air Service as a military airfield. The airfield was also expanded southward by the Japanese during the war, with these expansions forming the basis of the present-day Indonesian Air Force base located south of the runway.

The Japanese vacated the airbase following their surrender at the end of World War II. The airfield was soon taken over by Indonesian militias during the Indonesian National Revolution through diplomatic communication with the Japanese. When the Japanese withdrew, they left several aircraft at the airfield, some of which were later acquired by the Indonesian Air Force to support its war effort. The surrendered Japanese personnel were subsequently repatriated from the airfield to Semarang and Jakarta using the Douglas DC-3s of the Allied forces. When the Dutch launched Operation Product, the airfield was attacked and bombed by the ML-KNIL. In response, several revolutionary militias in Surakarta destroyed key infrastructure, including bridges and the airbase, to prevent them from being recaptured by Dutch forces. The scorched earth policy implemented during the Indonesian National Revolution around Panasan Airfield resulted in some aircraft, as well as fuel and certain munitions, being deliberately concealed by Indonesian fighters. This strategy was adopted due to the limited number of Indonesian personnel capable of operating the Japanese aircraft left behind. However, Operation Product ultimately devastated Panasan Airfield. Aircraft that had been intended for concealment were destroyed by an attack carried out by three Dutch P-51 Mustang aircraft. Office buildings, hangars, and several other airbase facilities were also damaged during this first military aggression. In addition, four personnel from the Panasan air force unit were killed in the attack. As a result, the airfield remained abandoned until the late 1950s, after the Dutch had withdrawn from Indonesia following the recognition of its sovereignty.

=== Independent era ===
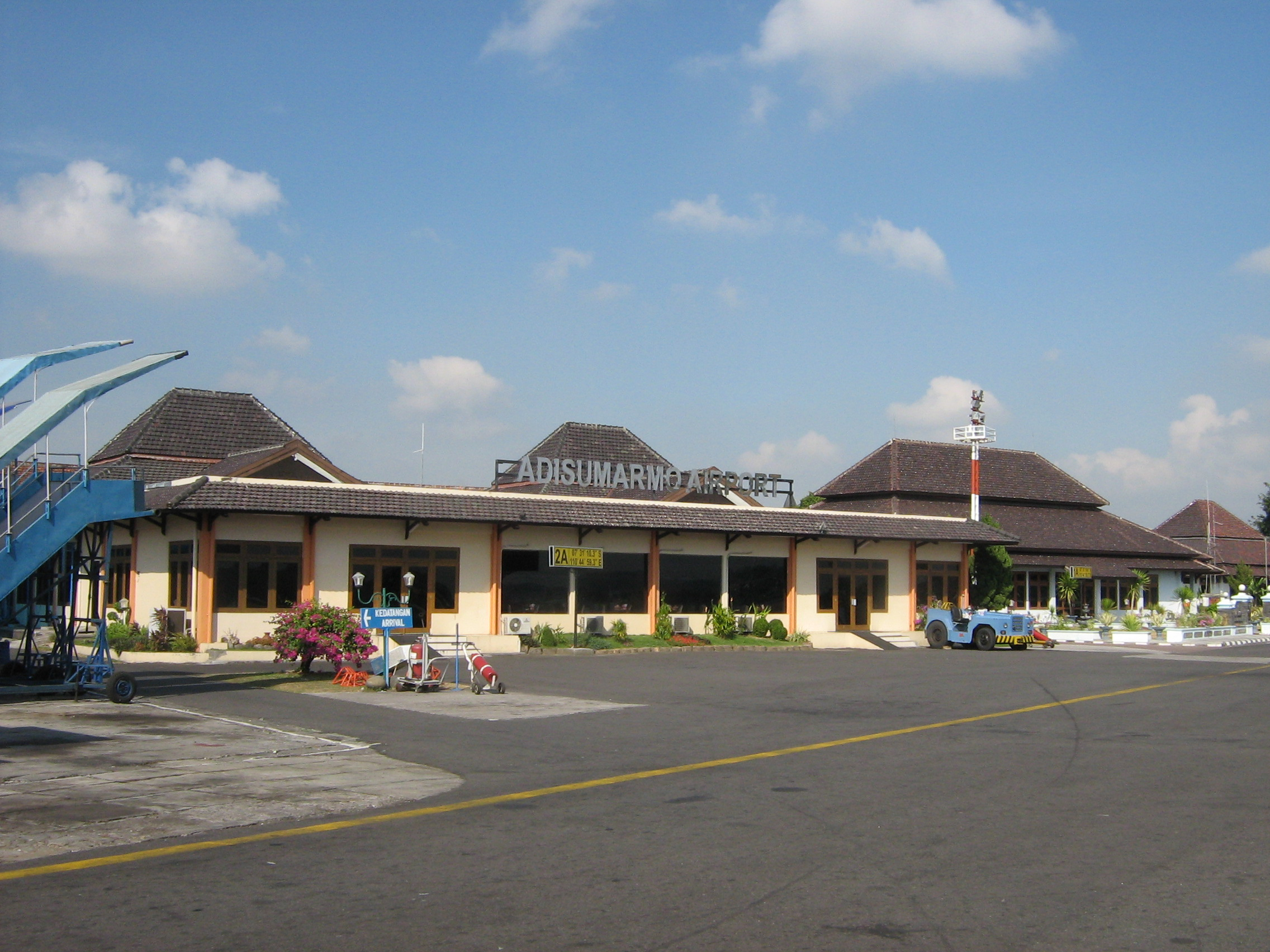
Former terminal of Adi Soemarmo Airport, now used by the Indonesian Air Force

It was not until 1959 that Panasan Air Base was reactivated by the Indonesian Air Force and officially designated as the Air Force Military Education Center (Pusat Pendidikan Kemiliteran Angkatan Udara, PPKAU).

On 24 March 1974, the Indonesian government, through the Directorate General of Civil Aviation and the Ministry of Defense and Security, officially opened Panasan Airport for civilian use. Commercial operations began on 23 April 1974, with Garuda Indonesia launching scheduled flights on the Jakarta–Solo and Solo–Jakarta routes, operating three times a week. Subsequently, on 25 July 1974, the airport was renamed to its current name, Adisoemarmo Airport, in honor of Adi Soemarmo Wirjokusumo, an Indonesian Air Force officer and national hero of Indonesia. He was the younger brother of Agustinus Adisucipto, another pioneer of the Indonesian Air Force, whose name was later used for the airport in Yogyakarta. Both brothers were killed on 29 July 1947 when their Douglas C-47 Skytrain was shot down by Dutch forces over Yogyakarta while delivering medical supplies to Republican-controlled area.

On 31 March 1989, the airport was designated as an international airport with the launch of international flight routes connecting Solo to Kuala Lumpur and Singapore. On 1 January 1992, management of the airport was officially transferred from the Directorate General of Civil Aviation to Angkasa Pura I, which is now known as InJourney Airports.

On 28 January 2008, the airport was temporarily closed to all commercial traffic to facilitate the arrival of the body of former Indonesian President Suharto, which was flown from Jakarta's Halim Perdanakusuma Airport. He was to be buried in Karanganyar later that day.

In 2016, Lion Air established Adisoemarmo Airport as one of its hubs to strengthen its flight connectivity network. The initiative aimed to expand service routes from Central Java—particularly from Solo—to various domestic and international destinations. Five domestic routes were introduced, connecting Solo with Banjarmasin, Lombok, Palangkaraya, Makassar, and Pontianak. Lion Air also planned to introduce additional services, including new routes to and from Solo as well as increased flight frequencies on existing routes. However, many of these routes were later discontinued due to operational and technical challenges.

Due to the absence of regular international flights, the Ministry of Transportation revoked the airport's international status on 2 April 2024. Despite this, the airport continues to serve seasonal flights to Jeddah and Medina in Saudi Arabia for Hajj and Umrah pilgrims. The airport's international status was reinstated in August 2025. Following the reinstatement, plans have been drawn up to resume international flights to Malaysia and Singapore, as well as to open new routes to China.

== Facilities and development ==
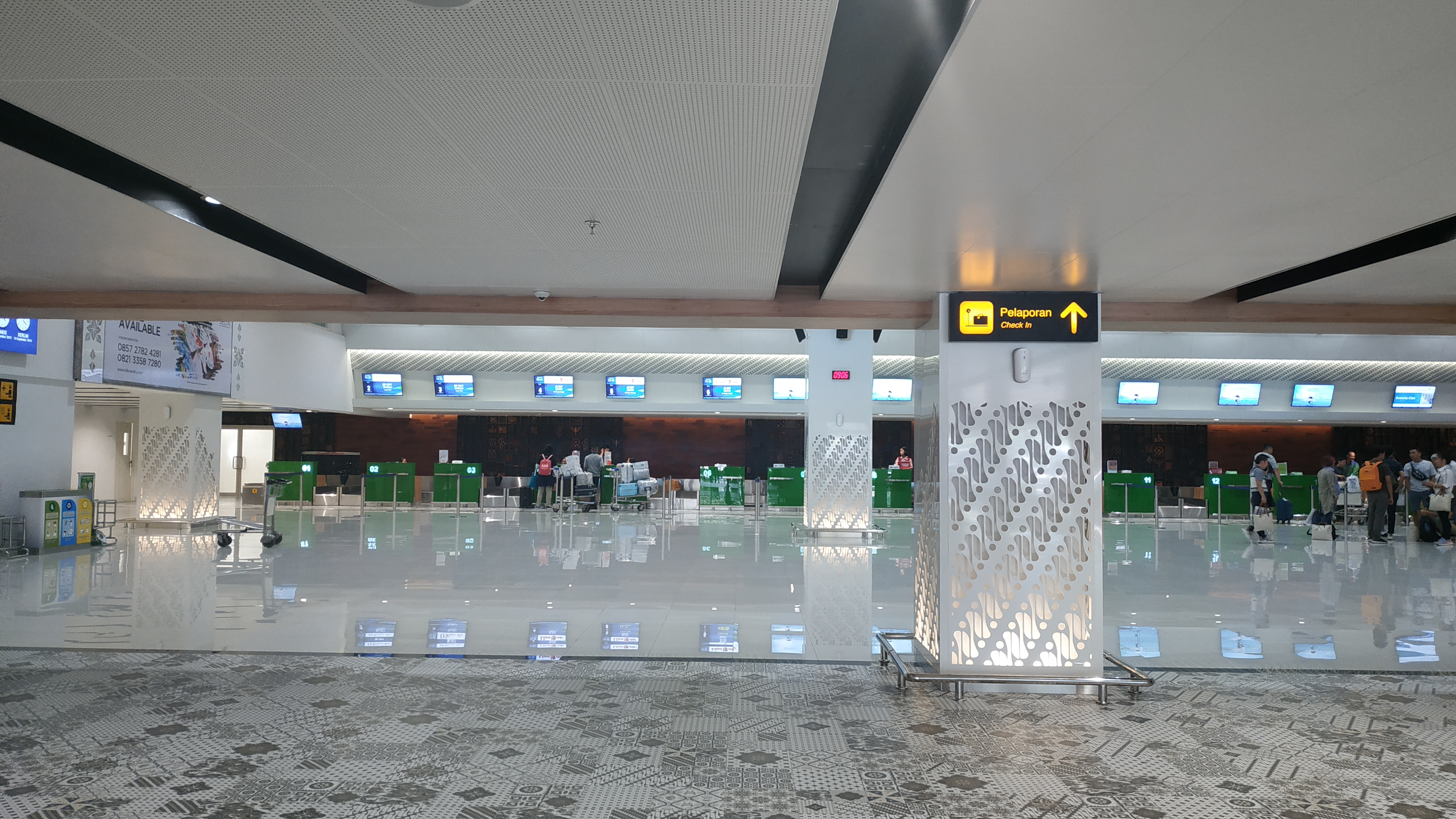
Check-in area following the 2019 expansion

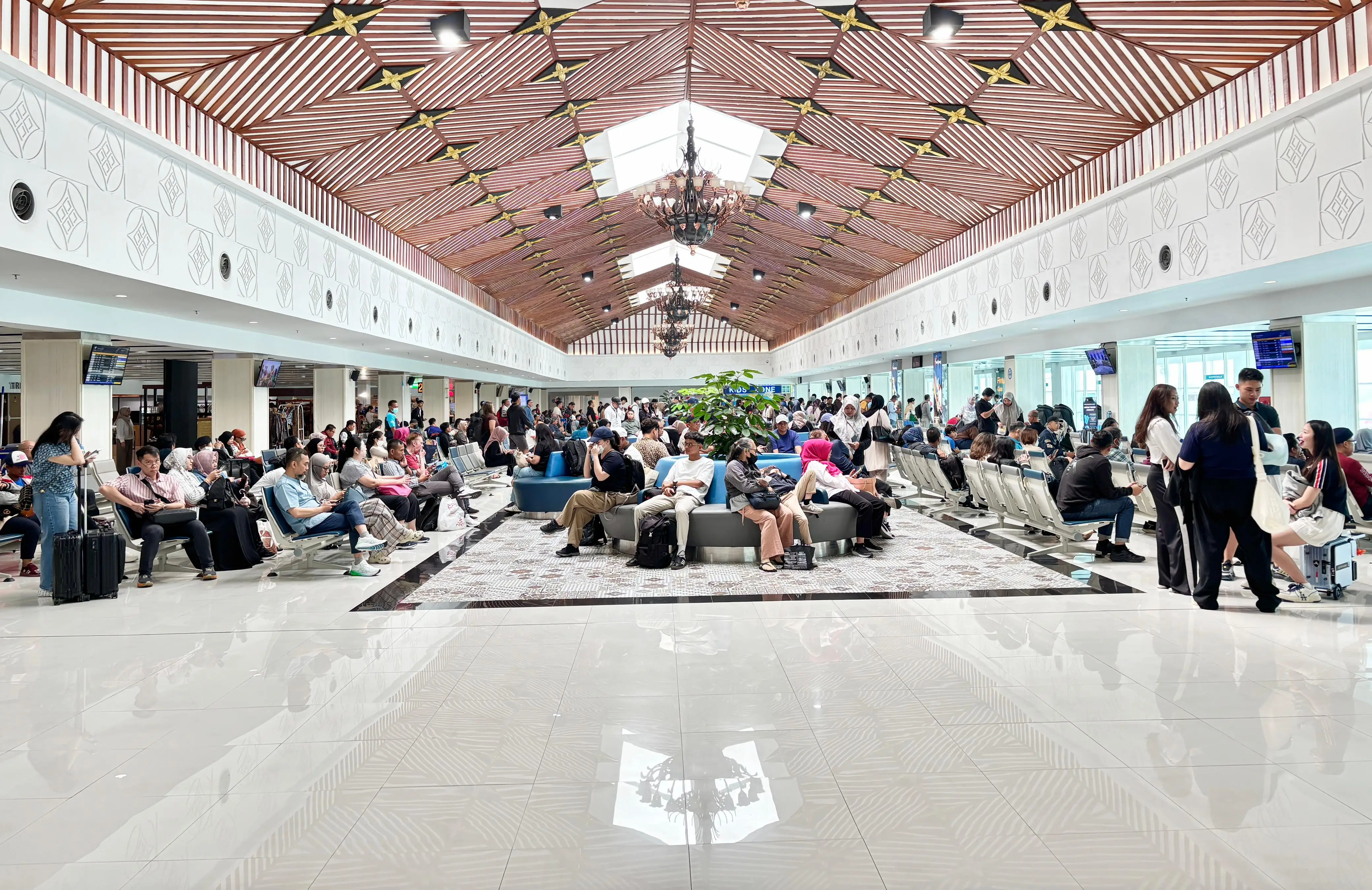
Boarding gate

To accommodate the growing air traffic in Solo, a new terminal was constructed and completed in 2009. Located north of the old terminal—across the runway and within the grounds of the Indonesian Air Force—the new terminal covers an area of 13,000 m^{2}, significantly larger than the 4,000 m^{2} of the original terminal. It features a new apron and parking stands capable of accommodating up to nine narrow-body aircraft, such as the Boeing 737 Classic series, or a combination of three wide-body and three narrow-body aircraft. In contrast, the old terminal could only support up to four narrow-body aircraft. The new terminal is also equipped with two jet bridges to enhance passenger convenience. The terminal began operations on 1 March 2009 and was officially inaugurated a week later, on 7 March 2009, by then-President Susilo Bambang Yudhoyono.

Another major expansion took place in 2019, involving the construction of a new terminal adjacent to the existing one. The new terminal, covering an area of 15,000 m^{2}, was designated for departures, while the existing terminal was repurposed exclusively for arrivals. It features 26 check-in counters—an increase from the 18 available in the original terminal—as well as an additional jet bridge. The terminal is also directly connected to the airport train station, improving passenger accessibility. Its interior design incorporates traditional batik motifs, which are prominently displayed on the floor tiles and wall decorations, reflecting local cultural identity. As part of the expansion project, the existing terminal also underwent renovation. The new terminal officially began operations on 1 August 2019. Following the expansion and renovation, the total terminal area of Adi Soemarmo Airport is 28,000 m^{2}, with a capacity to accommodate up to 4.1 million passengers annually, increasing from the previous capacity of only 1.5 million passengers annually. The completion of the terminal expansion coincided with the opening of the airport railway station, enabling a direct connection between the airport and Solo Balapan Station. The airport railway began operations on 29 December 2019.

There are plans to extend the runway from its current length of 2,600 meters to 3,000 meters to accommodate larger aircraft such as the Boeing 777. The extension is planned to be built on a 43-hectare plot of land. This would enable the airport to operate direct flights to Jeddah, Saudi Arabia, for Hajj pilgrims. Although it was originally expected to be completed by 2020, the project has yet to materialize due to the COVID-19 pandemic.

The Ministry of Transportation plans to develop Adi Soemarmo Airport into an aerocity. As part of this initiative, various zones will be established within the airport city and integrated through transit-oriented development (TOD) along the railway and toll road corridors. In addition, to support airline operations, the airport—having undergone significant expansion as a hub—will also be developed into a maintenance, repair, and overhaul (MRO) center, as well as a base for aircraft overnight parking (RON).

== Airlines and destinations ==
=== Passenger ===
Airlines	Destinations
Airfast Indonesia	Charter: Jakarta–Soekarno-Hatta, Timika
Batik Air	Jakarta–Soekarno-Hatta
Citilink	Jakarta–Soekarno-Hatta
Garuda Indonesia	Jakarta–Soekarno-Hatta
Lion Air	Seasonal: Jeddah, Medina
Super Air Jet	Denpasar

== Statistics ==
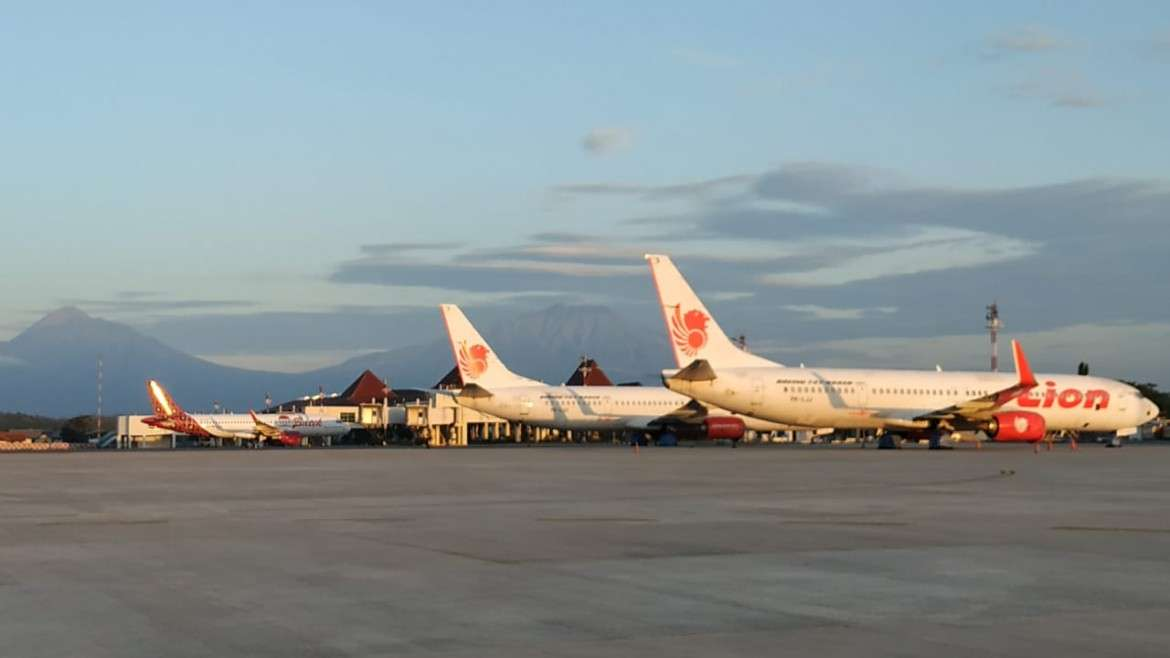
Aircraft lining up at Adisoemarmo International Airport

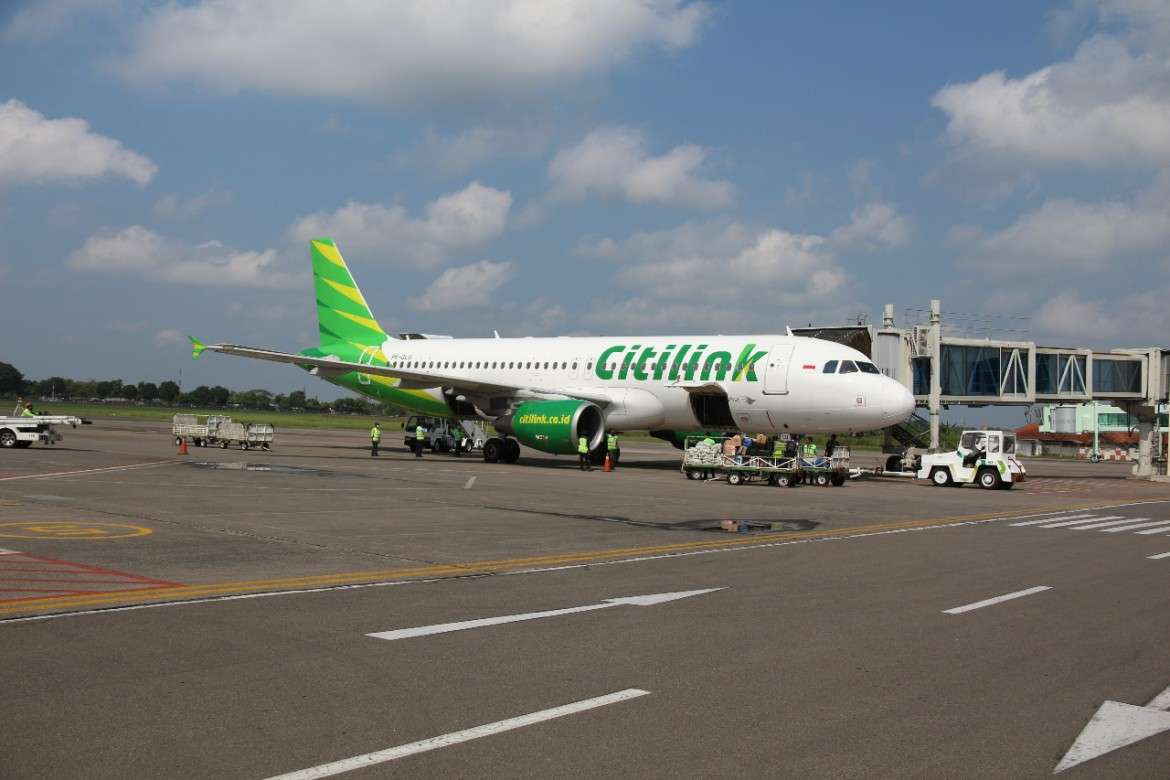
A Citilink Airbus A320-200 at Adisoemarmo International Airport

Annual passenger numbers and aircraft statistics
Year	Passengers handled	Passenger % change	Cargo (tonnes)	Cargo % change	Aircraft movements	Aircraft % change
2006	684,418	Steady	3,597	Steady	8,214	Steady
2007	716,991	▲4.8	2,499	▼30.5	15,294	▲86.2
2008	741,532	▲3.4	2,623	▲5.0	15,803	▲3.3
2009	773,687	▲4.3	2,249	▼14.3	13,297	▼15.9
2010	968,271	▲25.2	2,600	▲15.6	17,291	▲30.0
2011	2,342,987	▲142.0	3,363	▲29.3	17,467	▲1.0
2012	1,477,370	▼36.9	4,290	▲27.6	25,950	▲48.6
2013	1,511,228	▲2.3	5,264	▲22.7	24,268	▼6.5
2014	1,417,576	▼6.2	4,686	▼11.0	23,574	▼2.9
2015	1,525,053	▲7.6	5,930	▲26.5	14,486	▼38.6
2016	2,189,957	▲43.6	6,498	▲9.6	17,614	▲21.6
2017	2,785,000	▲27.2	7,736	▲19.1	21,558	▲22.4
2018	2,735,819	▼1.8	8,501	▲9.9	20,249	▼6.1
2019	1,722,842	▼37.0	5,141	▼39.5	14,103	▼30.4
2020	560,366	▼67.5	2,882	▼43.9	6,232	▼55.8
2021	427,992	▼23.6	1,872	▼35.0	4,065	▼34.8
2022	873,405	▲104.1	1,761	▼5.9	6,736	▲65.7
2023	1,229,296	▲40.7	3,054	▲73.4	8,796	▲30.6
2024	1,120,010	▼8.9	4,012	▲31.4	8,722	▼0.8
^{Source: DGCA, BPS}

== Ground transportation ==
=== Bus ===
Perum DAMRI operates airport shuttle buses that serve several destination from Adisumarmo Airport.

Since May 2011, Batik Solo Trans buses also connects the airport to the city.

=== Car and taxi ===
Various taxi and shuttle services are provided by numerous service providers.

=== Train ===
The 13.5-kilometer airport rail connects from Solo Balapan Station to Adi Soemarmo Airport. Construction of the airport rail line consists of two segments, namely segment 1, ranging from Solo Balapan Station to Kadipiro Station along 3.5 km which is the existing railway track. Meanwhile, segment 2, starting from Kadipiro to Adi Sumarmo Airport along the 10 km to be built new railway line. The presence of the airport train is one of the government's efforts to realize the integration between public transport modes and meet the needs of community mobilization, and to create safe, secure, convenient and timely transportation facilities. The airport train is formally launched on 29 December 2019. By using the airport train, the distance from Solo to Adi Sumarmo Airport will only take in 19 minutes and 27 minutes from the airport to the city with headway 40 minutes. This is the first airport train in Indonesia connects city directly to departure hall in the airport and faster than using a car which usually takes 40 to 60 minutes.

== Accidents and incidents ==
- On 30 November 2004, Lion Air Flight 538, a McDonnell Douglas MD-82 operating from Jakarta to Surabaya with a stopover in Surakarta, overran the runway while landing at the airport in bad weather. Of the 163 people on board, 25 were killed.
