= Batik Solo Trans =

Transportation service in Indonesia

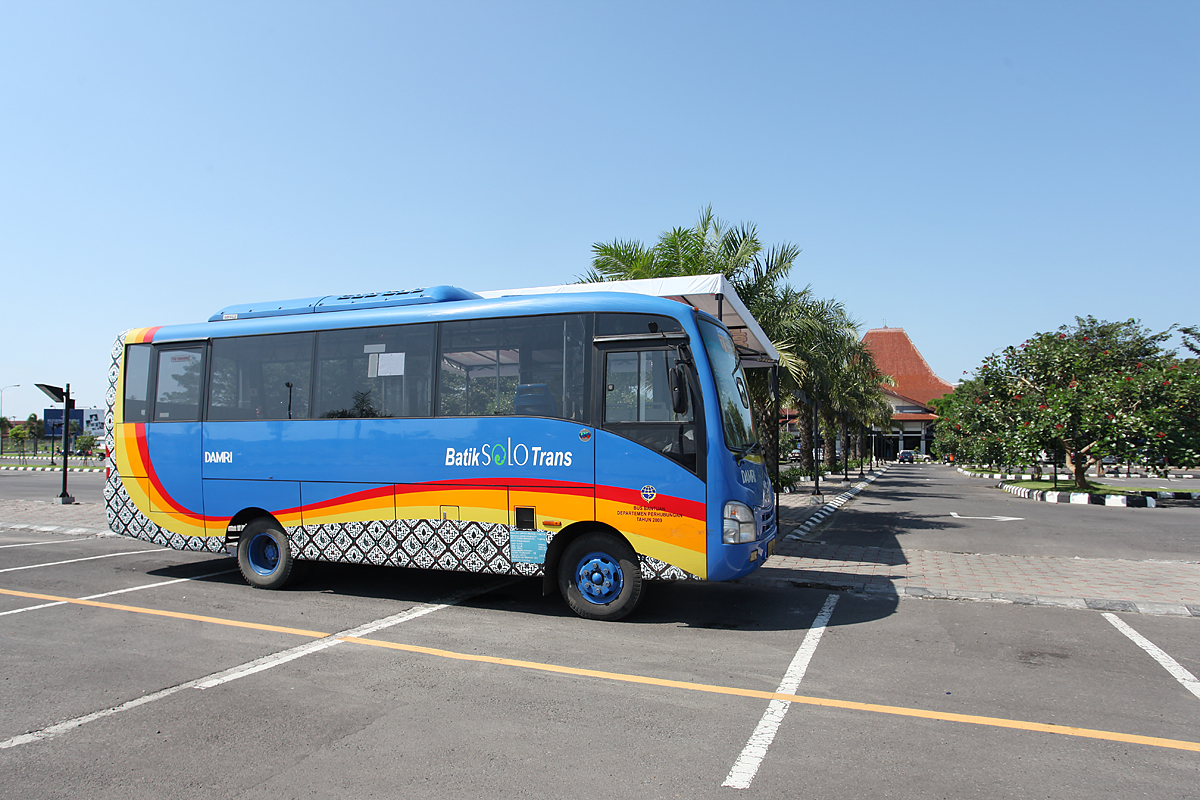

Overview
- Locale: Surakarta, Indonesia
- Transit type: Bus rapid transit
- Number of lines: 4
- Daily ridership: c. 19,000–20,000 (2024)

Operation
- Began operation: 1 September 2010; 16 years ago

Transit map of Surakarta, which includes BST bus and feeder routes

Batik Solo Trans (abbreviated BST) is a bus rapid transit system serving the city of Surakarta, Central Java. Launched in 2010, it currently operates 10 corridors.

== Summary ==
Batik Solo Trans was launched on 1 September 2010 by then-mayor of Surakarta Joko Widodo. The service, which initially had only a single corridor and 38 stations, was expanded with its second corridor in 2014 and a third in 2018.

In 2017, estimates place that 5,500-6,000 people used the first corridor daily, with another 3,500-4,000 in the second. The city's transportation board claimed that around 5,000 used the third corridor service daily. While it has some features of BRT systems, BST has low passenger throughput and lack a right of way in roads.

There were 90 buses in service on 2021. The BST also uses local angkot to act as feeders to the service.

During the COVID-19 pandemic, fares were abolished starting in July 2020. In January 2023, fares were reestablished and passengers were required to use noncash payments (such as electronic money cards or QRIS). Ridership immediately prior to this change was reported to be over 20,000 daily passengers, though this figure declined by 20-25% following this change. The annual ridership for the service was over 4.8 million people in 2023 up until 20 December.

== Bus Routes ==
Batik Solo Trans has 6 BRT routes, which are:

- Corridor 1: Palur Bus Terminal - Adisumarmo Airport (via Purwosari Train Station/ Palur Train Station/ Solo Jebres Train Station)
- Corridor 2: Palur Bus Terminal- Kerten Sub Terminal (via Solo Balapan Train Station/ Purwosari Train Station)
- Corridor 3: Kartasura Bus Terminal - Taman Lansia Jebres/ RS Jiwa (via Solo Jebres Train Station/ Klewer Market)
- Corridor 4: Kartasura Bus Terminal - Palur Bus Terminal (via STP/ SOLO Tirtonadi Bus Terminal/ De Tjolomadu/ Manahan Stadium)
- Corridor 5: Terminal Kartasura - Simpang Sidan Sukoharjo (via South of SOLO Toll Gate/ Manahan Stadium/ Klitikan Notoharjo Market/ Bekonang Market)
- Corridor 6: Terminal Tirtonadi - Solo Baru Sukoharjo (via The Park/ Pandawa lima Pillar/ Pakuwon Mall/ Indriati Hospital)

== Feeder Routes ==
- Corridor 7: RSUD Ngipang (Regional Hospital) - Klewer Market
- Corridor 8: Jayawijaya Garden (Mojosongo) - Tipes (Lotte Mart)
- Corridor 9: Taman Pelangi Mojosongo - Semanggi Sub Terminal - RSUD Bung Karno (Semanggi)
- Corridor 10: Palur Bus Terminal - Klewer Market
- Corridor 11: Tirtonadi Bus Terminal - Klewer Market
- Corridor 12: Klewer Market - Jongke Manrket
