= Alastua railway station =

Railway station in Indonesia

Alastua Station Stasiun Alastua
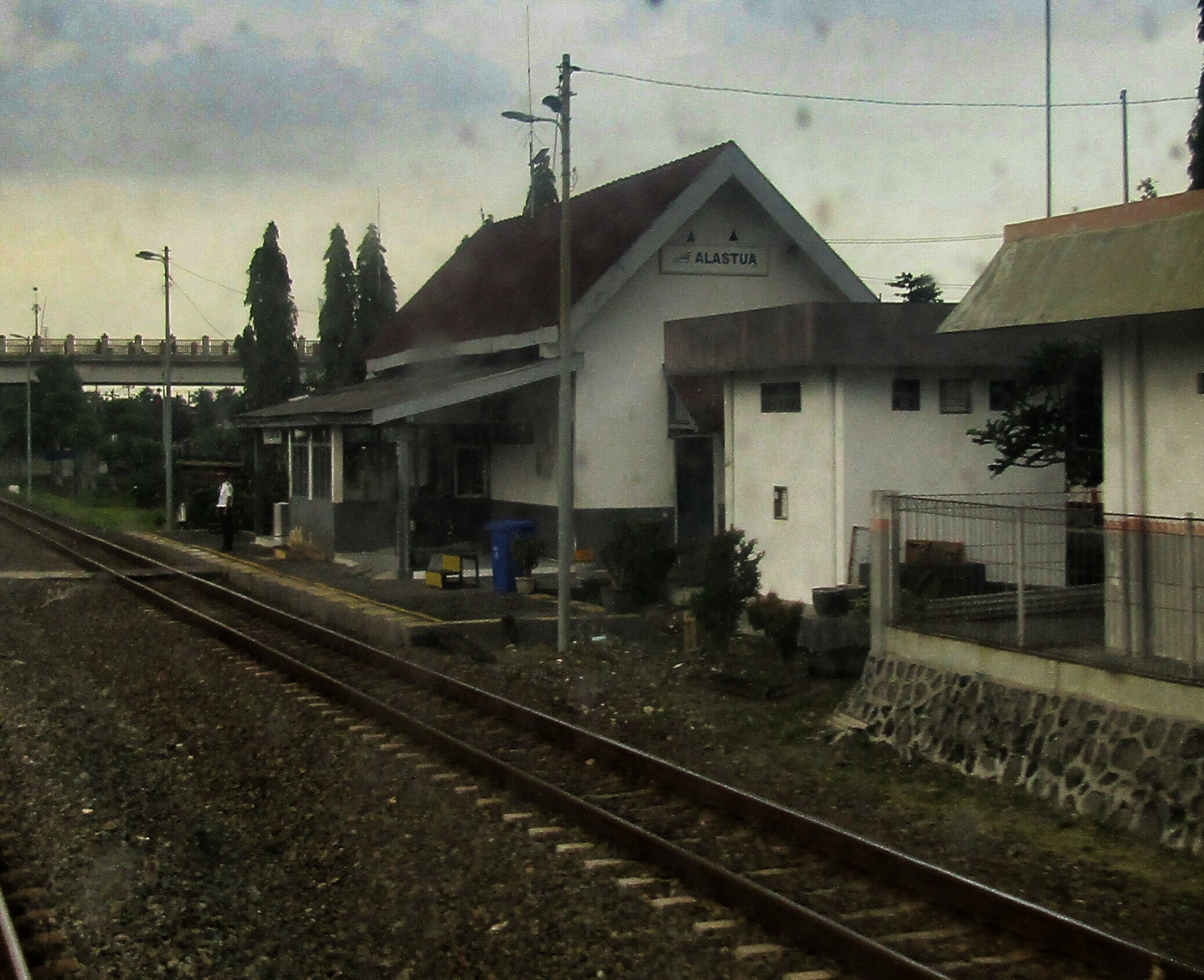
- Alastua Station

General information
- Location: Tlogomulyo, Pedurungan, Semarang; Central Java; Indonesia
- Coordinates: 6.98444°S 110.476°E
- Elevation: +6 m (20 ft)
- Owner: Kereta Api Indonesia
- Operator: Kereta Api Indonesia
- Line: Tegal–Brumbung
- Platforms: 2 island platforms 2 side platform
- Tracks: 6

Construction
- Structure type: Ground
- Parking: Available
- Accessible: Available

Other information
- Station code: ATA
- Classification: Class II

History
- Opened: 10 August 1867

Services
Preceding station	Kereta Api Indonesia	Following station
Semarang Tawang towards Semarang Poncol	Kedungsepur	Brumbung towards Ngrombo
Location
- Location within Semarang

Alastua Station (ATA) is a class II railway station located in Tlogomulyo, Pedurungan, Semarang. The station, which is located at an altitude of +6 m, is included in the Operation Area IV Semarang and is the station that is located at the easternmost location in the city of Semarang.

This station is a station located on the first railway line in Indonesia between Samarang Station (NIS) and Tanggung Station. This station is usually a stop for trains from the east heading to the west, especially if Semarang Tawang Station is flooded or the track is full or there is a severe traffic jam on Jl. Raya Kaligawe.

== Services ==
The following is a list of train services at the Alastua Station.

=== Passenger services ===
- Commuter
  - Kedung Sepur, to Semarang Poncol and to Ngrombo (executive)
  - Banyubiru, to Semarang Tawang and to Solo Balapan (executive and economy)

Preceding station	Kereta Api Indonesia	Following station
Semarang Tawang towards Tegal	Tegal–Brumbung	Brumbung; Terminus
