= Semarang metropolitan area =

Semarang metropolitan area Kedungsepur
- Metropolitan area
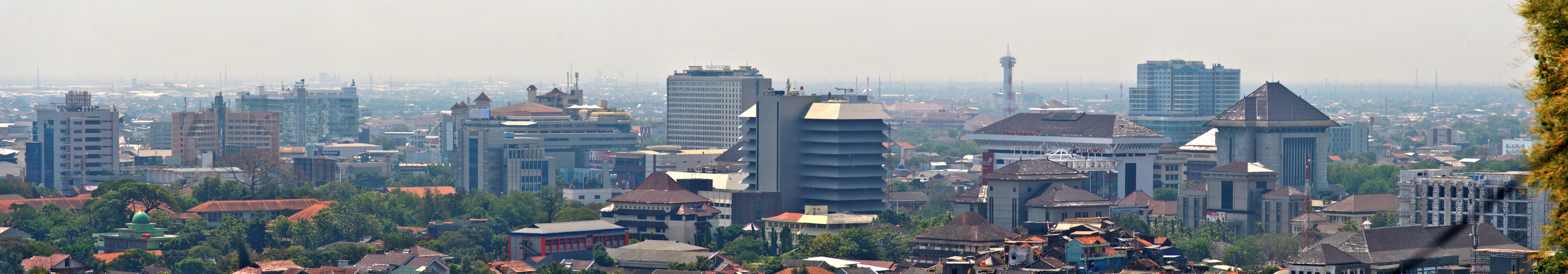
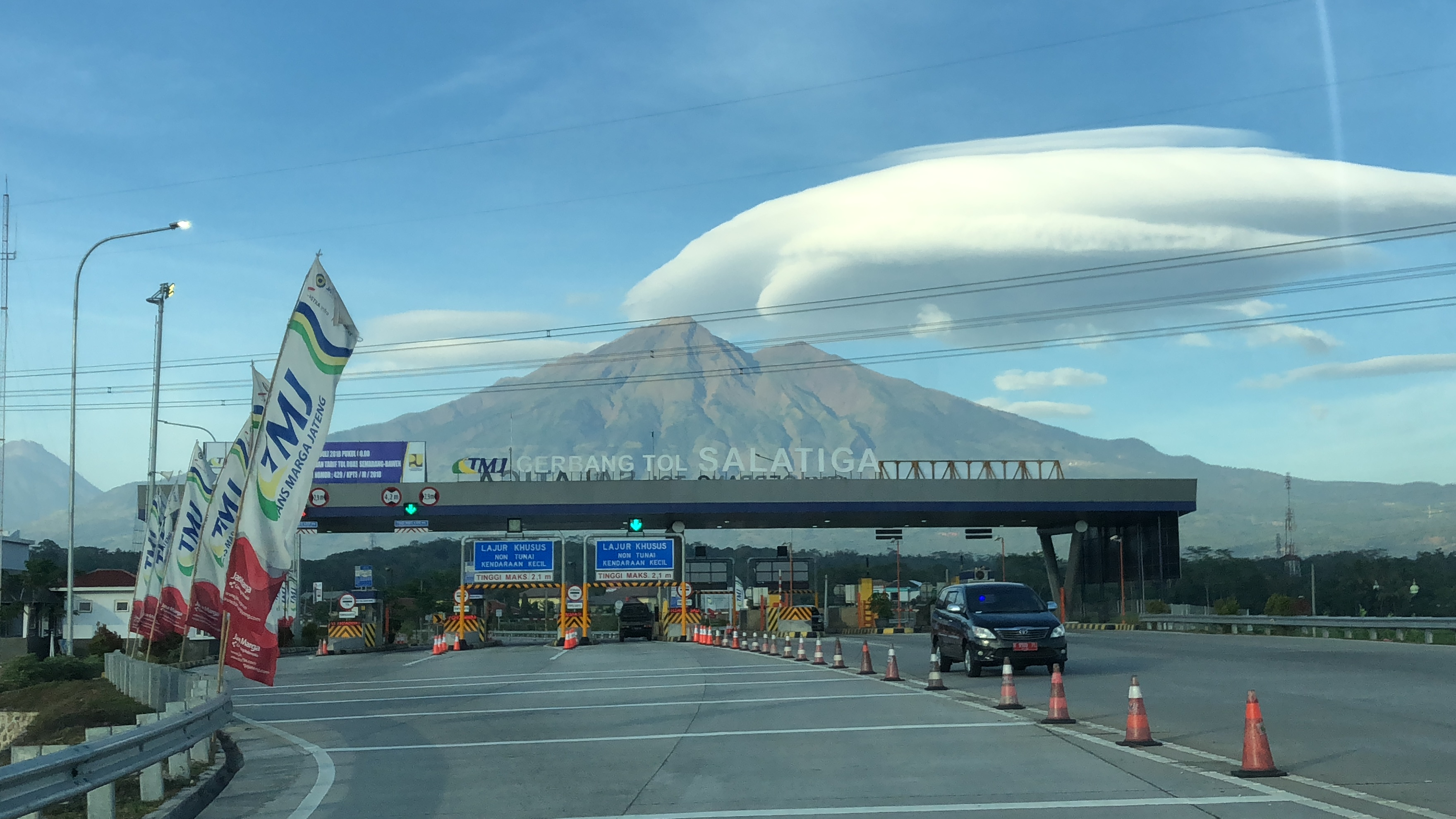
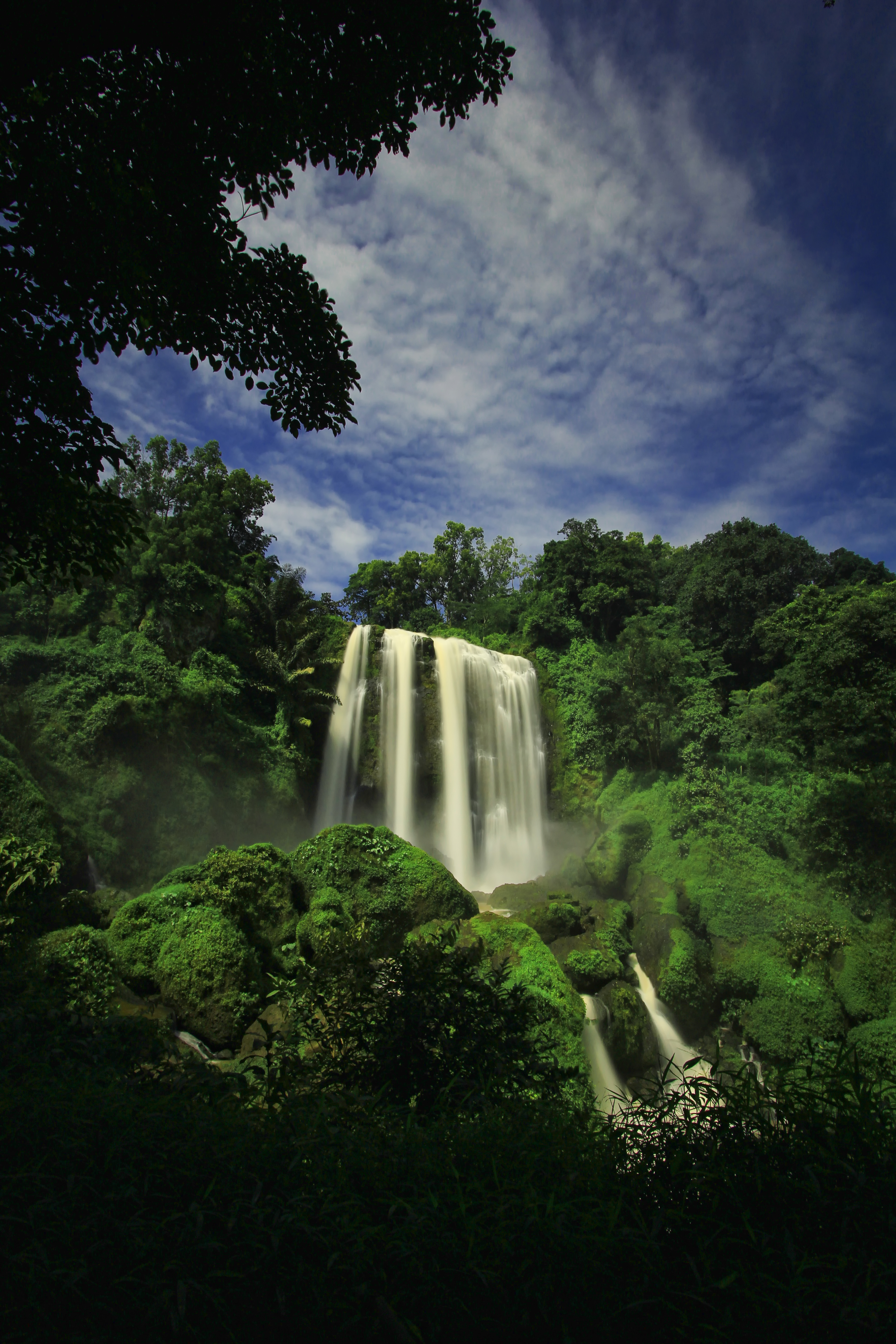
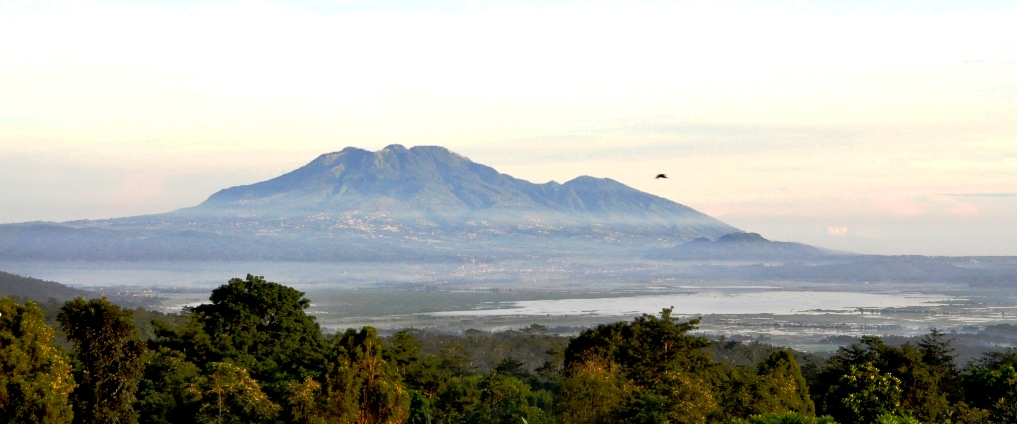
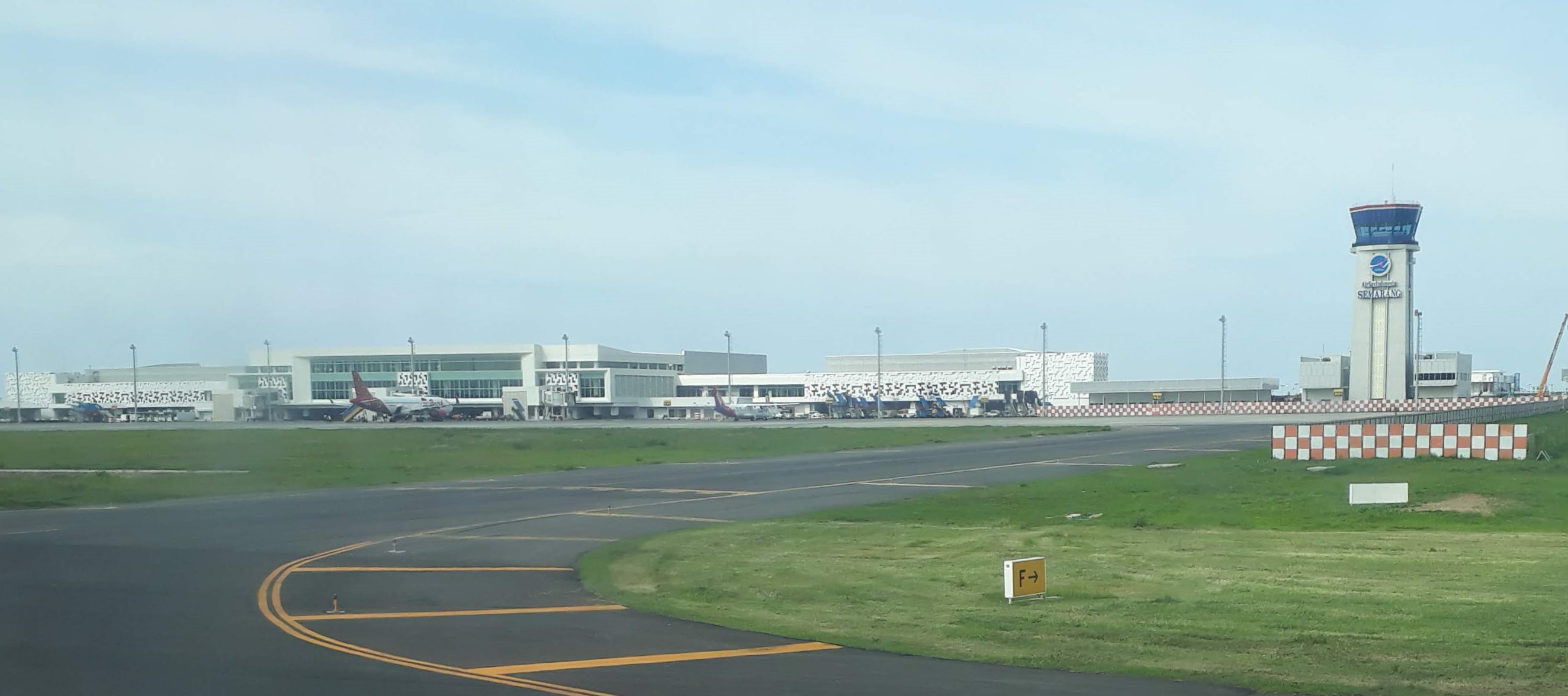
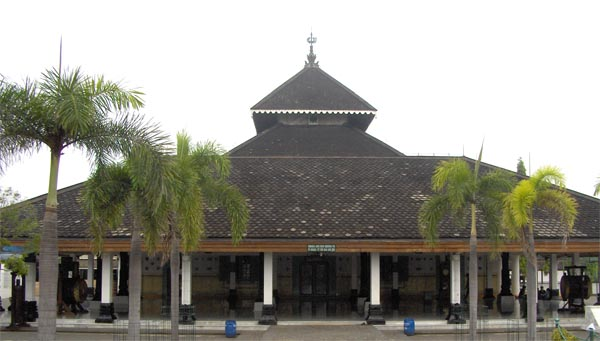
- From top, left to right: Semarang skyline, Mount Merbabu viewed from Salatiga Toll Gate, Sewu waterfall in Kendal Regency, view of Mount Ungaran, Lake Rawapening and the towns of Bandungan and Ambarawa in Semarang Regency, Jenderal Ahmad Yani International Airport in Semarang, Demak Great Mosque.
- Country: Indonesia
- Province: Central Java
- Core city: Semarang
- Satellite city: Salatiga
- Regencies: Demak Regency; Kendal Regency; Semarang Regency; Grobogan Regency (part)

Area
  - Metro: 4,591.16 km^{2} (1,772.66 sq mi)

Population
  - Metropolitan area: 6,197,102
- Time zone: UTC+7 (Indonesia Western Time)
- Vehicle registration: H
- GDP (nominal): 2023
- Total: ▲Rp 449.096 trillion ▲US$ 29.464 billion ▲US$ 94.362 billion (PPP)
- Per capita: ▲Rp 63.526 million ▲US$ 4,750 ▲US$ 13,348 (PPP)

The Semarang metropolitan area, known locally as Kedungsepur (an acronym of Kendal–Demak–Ungaran–Salatiga–Semarang–Purwodadi), is a metropolitan area anchored by the city of Semarang in Central Java, Indonesia. It additionally includes the city of Salatiga, as well as Demak Regency, Grobogan Regency (part only), Kendal Regency, and Semarang Regency. It is the fourth most populous metropolitan area in Indonesia with an estimated population of about 6.2 million as at mid 2023.

== Delineation ==
Population density of Java and Madura by subdistrict as of 2022, with major urban areas shown

Delineation of Semarang metropolitan area
Administrative division	Area in km^{2}	Pop'n Census 2010	Pop'n Census 2020	Pop'n mid 2023 estimate	Number of districts	Number of villages
City of Semarang	373.78	1,555,984	1,653,524	1,694,740	16	177
City of Salatiga	54.98	170,332	192,322	201,369	4	23
Demak Regency	995.32	1,055,579	1,203,956	1,240,510	14	249
Grobogan Regency (part) (Note: Only the western part of Grobogan Regency is included in the metropolitan area; the eastern part (7 districts covering 89 villages) is outside the area. The area and population figures have been amended to exclude the areas outside the metropoliutan area.)	2,023.85	802,160	888,581	1,492,891	12	191
Kendal Regency	1,002.23	900,313	1,018,505	1,052,830	20	286
Semarang Regency	1,019.27	930,727	1,053,094	1,080,648	19	235
Total Kedungsepur	5,453.99	5,415,095	6,009,982	6,760,538	85	1,161

== Transportation ==
Semarang is served by Trans Semarang bus rapid transit, comprising at least eight main corridors. Another bus rapid transit, the provincial-owned Trans Jateng has two corridors southward and westward in the Semarang metropolitan area, linking Semarang Tawang Station (Semarang) to Bawen Bus Terminal (Semarang Regency) and Mangkang Bus Terminal (Semarang) to Bahurekso Bus Terminal (Kendal Regency).

The eastern part of the Semarang metropolitan area is served by Kedungsepur commuter rail.

== See also ==
- List of metropolitan areas in Indonesia
- Jakarta metropolitan area
- Surabaya metropolitan area
- Bandung metropolitan area
