= Semarang Tawang–Brumbung–Surabaya Pasar Turi railway =

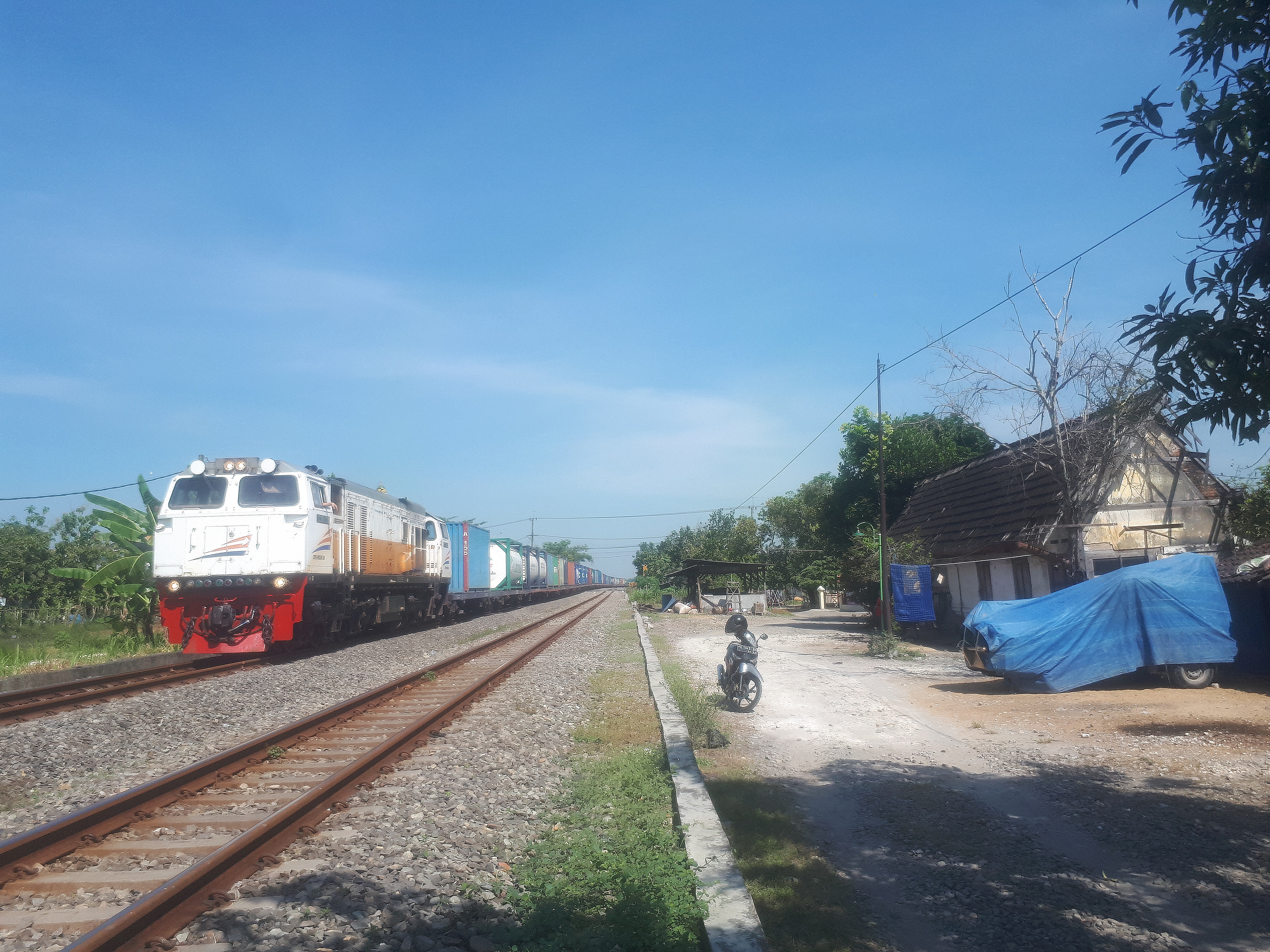
- Container Freight train passing at the Celangap, 2020

Overview
- Native name: Jalur kereta api Semarang Tawang–Brumbung–Surabaya Pasarturi
- Status: Operational
- Owner: Directorate General of Railways (DJKA)
- Locale: Semarang -Brumbung -Surabaya (Pasar Turi)
- Termini: Semarang Tawang; Surabaya Pasar Turi
- Stations: 59

Service
- Type: Inter-city rail and Commuter rail
- Operator: PT Kereta Api Indonesia

History
- Opened: 1867-1924

Technical
- Num of tracks: 2
- Track gauge: 1,067 mm (3 ft 6 in)
- Electrification: not available

The Semarang Tawang–Brumbung–Surabaya Pasar Turi railway (Indonesian: Jalur kereta api Semarang Tawang–Brumbung–Surabaya Pasarturi) is a railway line that connects Semarang Tawang and Surabaya Pasarturi. The Semarang Tawang–Brumbung section opened in 1867, and the line was extended to Surabaya Pasar Turi in 1924. This route crosses Semarang, Bojonegoro, Lamongan Regency, Lamongan, Gresik Regency, and Surabaya.

The line is the busiest intercity route on the northern railway corridor between Jakarta and Surabaya.

On the Gundih–Padangan segment, the line is in Semarang Operation Area IV. On the Tobo–Surabaya Pasarturi segment, the line is in Surabaya Operation Area VIII. KAI Commuter operates trains on the Cepu–Surabaya Pasarturi segment.

The line connects Jakarta and West Java with Central Java and East Java. The main route from Bandung to Surabaya follows Java Island's southern railway corridor via Yogyakarta. The entire railway line was built by the Nederlandsch-Indische Spoorweg Maatschappij (NIS) as part of its railway development project following the success of the Semarang–Vorstenlanden railway line. The Brumbung–Cepu segment was built by the Class I Railway Engineering Center in Semarang, while the Padangan–Surabaya Pasarturi segment was built by the center in Surabaya.

== History ==
=== Semarang Tawang-Brumbung (1864-1967) ===
The project to build the Semarang–Surabaya railway line dates to 1860. The Poolman plantation company submitted a proposal to build a railway line from Semarang to Surakarta, which the Governor General of the Dutch East Indies subsequently approved. In 1863, Indonesia's first railway company, Nederlandsch-Indische Spoorweg Maatschappij (NISM), was founded by Poolman and other companies to build the railway line. On 17 June 1864, the Governor General of the Dutch East Indies, L.A.J. Baron Sloet van de Beele, broke ground for the first railway line in Kemijen Village, Semarang, on the Semarang–Surakarta–Yogyakarta route.

=== Brumbung-Surabaya Pasar Turi ===
In the 1890s, the Dutch East Indies railways entered a new phase. The 1893 Railway Master Plan followed the enactment of regulations governing the stoomtram project and changes to existing concessions. After recovering financially, the Nederlandsch-Indische Spoorweg Maatschappij (NIS) began adding new railway lines using steam-tram technology and a 1,067 mm (3 ft 6 in) guage. First, the NIS discussed plans for the Secang–Yogyakarta railway line and its branch to Parakan.

The Semarang Tawang–Brumbung–Surabaya Pasarturi railway line was built by NIS after the company obtained a concession through Decree No. 1, dated 24 September 1896. The line had a gauge of 1,067 mm. Construction proceeded from two directions: one from Surabaya and the other from the area around Gundih Station. The completion dates were as follows:

- The Surabaya–Lamongan segment was completed on 1 April 1900.
- The Lamongan–Babat segment was completed on 15 August 1900.
- The Gundih–Kradenan segment was completed on 15 October 1900.
- The Kradenan–Cepu and Babat–Bojonegoro segments were completed on 15 March 1902.
- The remaining sections of the line were completed on 1 February 1903.

NIS also built the Sumari–Gresik–Kandangan railway line. The concession period was 76 years for the Yogyakarta–Magelang stoomtram project and 75 years for the Gundih–Surabaya line. The similarity between the concession periods has been attributed to the special status of the two projects.

=== Double-track Project ===
In 2011, double-track construction between Semarang Tawang and Surabaya Pasar Turi began. On 26 March 2014, Deputy Minister of Transportation Bambang Susantono reviewed preparations for the opening of the double-track line on the Semarang–Bojonegoro route. The line began operating on 28 March 2014, although its opening was delayed by the switch-over process. On 24 April 2014, the then Vice President of Indonesia, Boediono, reviewed preparations for the inauguration of the double-track line at Bojonegoro. The review coincided with the launch of Gapeka 2014.

== Service ==
The following trains operate on the Semarang Tawang–Brumbung–Surabaya Pasarturi railway line:

=== Executive class ===
- Argo Bromo Anggrek, between Gambir and Surabaya Pasarturi
- Sembrani, between Gambir and Surabaya Pasarturi
- Pandalungan, between Gambir and Jember via Surabaya Pasar Turi
- Argo Anjasmoro, between Gambir and Surabaya Pasarturi (facultative service)
- Brawijaya, between Gambir and Malang via Solo Jebres

=== Mixed class ===
- Gumarang, between Pasar Senen and Surabaya Pasar Turi (economy and executive)
- Kertajaya, between Pasar Senen and Surabaya Pasar Turi (economy and executive; operates only as an additional service)
- Dharmawangsa Express, between Pasar Senen and Surabaya Pasar Turi (economy and executive)
- Harina, between Bandung and Surabaya Pasar Turi (premium economy and executive)
- Blambangan Express, between Pasar Senen and Ketapang (economy and executive)
- Sancaka Utara, between Surabaya Pasar Turi and Cilacap via Yogyakarta
- Jayabaya, between Pasar Senen and Malang via Surabaya Pasar Turi
- Brantas, between Pasar Senen and Blitar via Semarang Tawang (economy and executive)
- Joglosemarkerto, a loop line

=== Economy ===
- Kertajaya, between Pasar Senen and Surabaya Pasar Turi (premium economy; regular service)
- Airlangga, between Pasar Senen and Surabaya Pasar Turi
- Majapahit, between Pasar Senen and Malang via Semarang Tawang
- Matarmaja, between Pasar Senen and Malang via Semarang Poncol
- Maharani, between Semarang Poncol and Surabaya Pasar Turi
- Ambarawa Express, between Semarang Poncol and Surabaya Pasar Turi
- Blora Jaya Express, between Semarang Poncol and Cepu

=== Commuter ===
- Kedung Sepur, between Semarang Poncol and Ngrombo

=== Freight ===
- Overnight train service, between Kampung Bandan and Surabaya Pasar Turi (Northern Parcel)
- Container freight, between Tanjung Priok, Klari, Kampung Bandan, Semarang Tawang, Benteng station, and Kalimas
- Indocement cement freight, between Nambo, Arjawinangun, Brambanan, and Kalimas station
- Container and steel coil freight, between Krenceng and Kalimas station

== See also ==
- Cirebon Prujakan–Semarang Tawang railway
- Cikampek–Cirebon Prujakan railway
