= Cirebon Prujakan–Semarang Tawang railway =

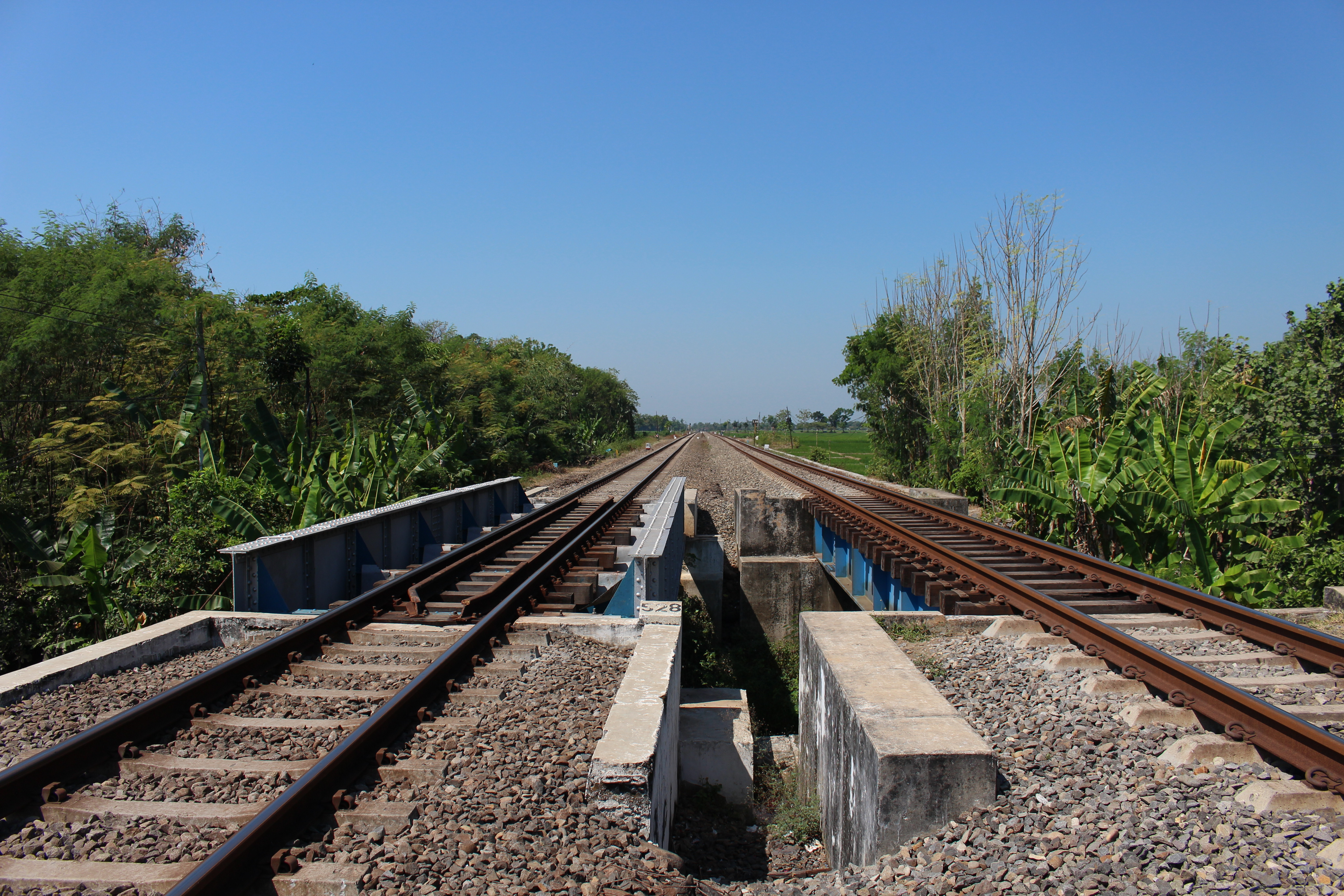
- Double-track railway in Petarukan, Pemalang, Central Java

Overview
- Native name: Jalur kereta api Cirebon Prujakan–Semarang Tawang
- Status: Operational
- Owner: Directorate General of Railways (DJKA)
- Locale: Cirebon, West Java - Semarang, Central Java
- Termini: Cirebon Prujakan; Semarang Tawang
- Stations: 75

Service
- Type: Inter-city rail and Commuter rail
- Operator(s): PT Kereta Api Indonesia

History
- Opened: 1897-1899

Technical
- Number of tracks: 2
- Track gauge: 1,067 mm (3 ft 6 in)
- Electrification: not available

The Cirebon Prujakan–Semarang Tawang railway (Indonesian: Jalur kereta api Cirebon Prujakan–Semarang Tawang) is a railway line that connects Cirebon Prujakan and Semarang Tawang that opened in 1897-1899 then continued to Solo Balapan and Surabaya Pasar Turi. This route crosses on province with 6 regencies or cities, namely Cirebon, Brebes Regency, Tegal Regency, Pemalang, Pekalongan, and Semarang.

This lines part of the Cikampek-Cirebon-Semarang Tawang railway line, also the busiest intercity and commuter line between Cikampek, Cirebon, and Semarang due Double-track railway. This line is included in Operational Area III Cirebon on the Brebes–Cirebon Prujakan segment, while Operational Area IV Semarang on the Tegal–Semarang Tawang segment. This line is developed by the Class I Bandung Railway Engineering Center on the Cirebon Prujakan–Losari segment and Semarang on the Tanjung–Semarang Tawang segment.

This route connects Jakarta and West Java with Central Java and East Java. However, the main route from Bandung to Surabaya (Surabaya Gubeng) is the southern route of Java Island via Yogyakarta. This route includes the most diverse views, ranging from paddy fields, city centers, teak forests, to seaside views in the area between Pekalongan-Semarang.

The entire railway line was built by the Semarang–Cheribon Stoomtram Maatschappij (SCS) in collaboration with other companies, including the Staatsspoorwegen (SS) and the Nederlandsch-Indische Spoorweg Maatschappij (NIS). Based on the construction history, the line started from Semarang SCS Station, while Semarang Poncol was later built to replace it.

== History ==
=== Steam Tramway ===
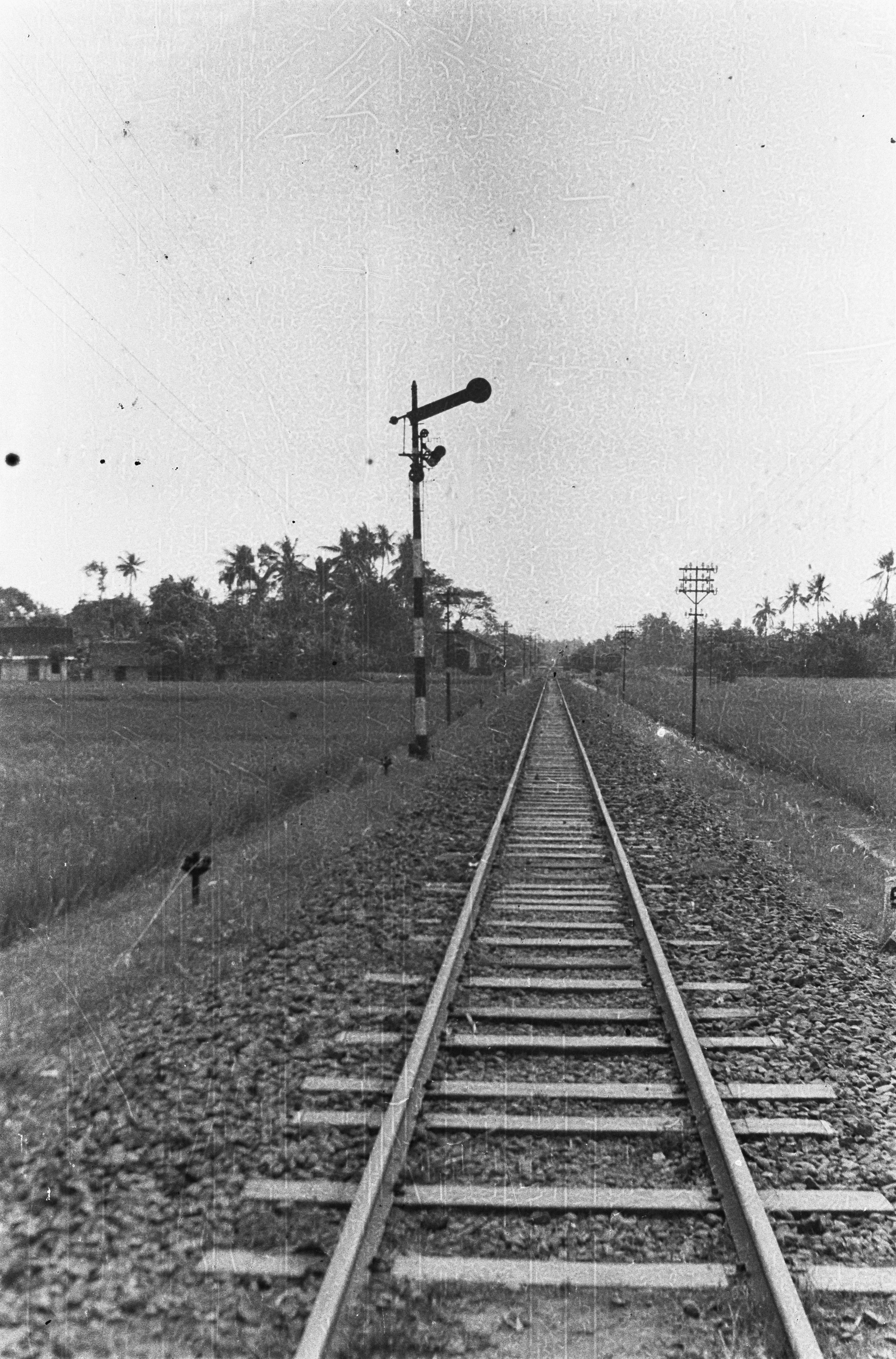
Mechanic railway signal heading to Weleri, 1759

In 1884, a Semarang Tawang–Cirebon Prujakan railway concession was proposed by Mr. Ruyl et al. (besluit dated 23 February 1884 No. 8). However, this concession couldn't be realized. After several years without news, Mr. Ruyl et al. were given a one-year extension to begin implementing the Semarang Tawang–Cirebon Prujakan line concession. The extension was implemented on 1 July 1891, at the urging of Minister Baron Mackay, who was asked to immediately complete the interest guarantee application. However, this concession was finally rejected a year later after considering the results of consultations with Minister Van Dedem. The cancellation of Ruyl's concession (besluit September 1893 No. 12), the guarantee capital of ƒ250,000 previously paid to the State was cancelled; it was returned to the concession holder.

A new concession proposal was then submitted by the Financiëele Maatschappij van Nijverheidsondernemingen, which was approved by decree No. 1 dated December 1893. The Semarang–Cheribon Stoomtram Maatschappij (SCS) was formed. SCS took over the concession and immediately began construction, so that of the total length of the line of 245.5 km, the first segment of 29.7 km (18.4 mil) to Kendal was completed on 2 May 1897. Work continued on both sides (Cirebon Prujakan and Semarang Tawang). The last segment connecting Pekalongan and Pemalang (33.8 km (21 mil)) was opened to public traffic on 1 February 1899.

In detail, the opening dates for each segment are as follows:

- Semarang West (Pendrikan)–Kaliwungu–Kendal segment, opened 2 May 1897
- Kendal–Kalibodri–Weleri segment, opened 1 November 1897
- Weleri–Pekalongan segment, opened 1 December 1898
- Pekalongan–Pemalang segment, opened 1 February 1899
- Pemalang–Tegal segment, opened 23 June 1898
- Tegal–Brebes segment, opened 15 November 1897
- Brebes–Losari segment, opened 8 May 1898
- Losari–Ciledug segment, opened 10 October 1897
- Ciledug–Sindanglaut segment, opened 8 July 1897
- Sindanglaut–Mundu–Cirebon SCS segment, opened 1 May 1897

=== Becoming a heavy railway line ===
With the increasing need for rail service on the Cirebon–Semarang route, SCS changed the status of its steam tramway to a railway. SCS submitted a proposal to the Dutch East Indies Government on 23 March 1909, regarding the planned conversion of the steam tramway to a railway so that the Batavia–Semarang train could be completed in one day. However, this project began in 1911, so when the Cikampek–Cirebon Prujakan railway line was completed, the conversion project was still incomplete. Part of the railway line was rerouted so that faster and heavier trains could pass without disrupting the Pantura Highway. This allowed the old 245 km (152 mil) line to be shortened to just 222 km (137 mil). The construction of the shortcut line included:

- Kalibodri–Kaliwungu no via Kendal, opened 1 January 1914
- Mundu–Losari segment, opened 1 May 1915.

Segments that had existed since the 1890s were later turned into branch lines, or even no longer used by the SCS (see Bedilan–Waruduwur railway line and Kalibodri–Kendal–Kaliwungu railway line). On 1 November 1914, SCS is exploring a partnership with Staatsspoorwegen (SS) to open a Semarang–Batavia round trip train, in connection with the completion of the line to Cirebon Port and the connection between Cirebon SS and Cirebon SCS.

In addition to building new lines, we are also arranging the stations, with the following details:'

- Construction of Semarang Poncol, opened 6 August 1914, eliminating Semarang SCS Station (Pendrikan).
- Arrangement of the emplacement and construction of Cirebon Prujakan Station, opened 1 November 1914.
- Construction of Tegal Station, opened 1 May 1918.

The connection between Semarang NIS Station (Tawang) and Semarang SCS (Poncol) couldn't be implemented yet, even though they were close together. The connection was only realized on 4 January 1941. This connection aimed to integrate the SCS line with the NIS and SJS lines.

=== Double-track Project ===
Construction of the double track on this line began in 2002. The first segment was the Brebes–Tegal Station segment which opened on 15 December 2003. Next, This project was continued in 2007, with the construction of the Petarukan to Pemalang route. This project was budgeted for 2007 and tested on 30 October 2008 and continued to Tegal in 2009. On 9 September 2009, The Tegal to Pekalongan railway line was finally inaugurated by the President of Indonesia at that time, SBY.

The progress of the double track construction continued in 2012-2013, with a total land acquisition of 1,165,395 square meters. Construction of this line includes replacing rails, sleepers, and grading the hill in Plabuan. The details of the completion of this double track are as follows:

- Losari–Waruduwur operated starting 17 June 2013
- Pekalongan–Ujungnegoro operated starting 3 July 2013
- Waruduwur–Cirebon Prujakan operated starting 4 July 2013
- Weleri–Kaliwungu operated starting 21 November 2013
- Brebes–Losari operated starting 10 December 2013
- Kaliwungu– Jerakah operated starting 11 December 2013
- Semarang Poncol–Semarang Tawang operated starting 7 February 2014
- Ujungnegoro–Weleri operated starting 14 March 2014
- Jerakah–Semarang Poncol operated starting 28 March 2014

The total length of the doubled Pantura line reached 727 km (451 mil). The project was finally completed in 2014 at a cost of Rp 9.8 trillion. What's more, the exciting story of the construction of this double track was later documented in the book "Northern Cross Double Track: Acceleration and Benefits," written by Hermanto Dwiatmoko, the Director General of Railways at the time.

== Service ==
Here's that train passing at Cirebon-Semarang

=== Executive class ===
- Argo Bromo Anggrek, between Gambir and Surabaya Pasarturi
- Sembrani, between Gambir and Surabaya Pasarturi
- Argo Muria and Argo Sindoro, between Gambir and Semarang Tawang
- Argo Merbabu, between Gambir and Semarang Tawang
- Pandalungan, between Gambir and Jember via Surabaya Pasar Turi
- Argo Anjasmoro, between Gambir and Surabaya Pasarturi (facultative only)
- Brawijaya, between Gambir and Malang via Solo Jebres

=== Mixed class ===
- Gumarang, between Pasar Senen and Surabaya Pasar Turi (economy and executive)
- Kertajaya, between Pasar Senen and Surabaya Pasar Turi (economy and executive) (addition only)
- Dharmawangsa Express, between Pasar Senen and Surabaya Pasar Turi (economy and executive)
- Tegal Bahari, between Pasar Senen and Tegal (economy and executive)
- Ciremai, between Bandung and Semarang Tawang (economy and executive)
- Harina, between Bandung and Surabaya Pasar Turi (premium economy and executive)
- Brantas, between Pasar Senen and Blitar via Semarang Tawang (economy and executive)
- Blambangan Express, between Pasar Senen and Ketapang (economy and executive)
- Jayabaya, between Pasar Senen and Malang via Semarang Tawang (economy and executive)
- Gunungjati train, between Gambir, Cirebon, and Semarang Tawang (economy and executive)
- Tawang Jaya and Menoreh, between Pasar Senen and Semarang Tawang (economy and executive)

=== Economy ===
- Kertajaya, between Pasar Senen and Surabaya Pasar Turi (premium economy) (regular)
- Majapahit train, between Pasar Senen and Malang via Semarang Tawang
- Matarmaja train, between Pasar Senen and Malang via Semarang Poncol
- Airlangga, between Pasar Senen and Surabaya Pasar Turi
- Maharani, between Semarang Poncol and Surabaya Pasar Turi
- Ambarawa Express, between Semarang Poncol and Surabaya Pasar Turi
- Blora Jaya Express, between Semarang Poncol and Cepu

=== Agglomeration rail ===
- Kamandaka, between Semarang Tawang and Cilacap
- Joglosemarkerto, loop line
- Kaligung, between Semarang Poncol, Tegal, Brebes, and Cirebon Prujakan

=== Commuter ===
Kedung Sepur, between Semarang Poncol and Ngrombo

=== Freight ===
- Overnight train service, between Kampung Bandan and Surabaya Pasar Turi (Northern Parcel)
- Container Freight, between Tanjung Priok, Klari, Kampung Bandan, Semarang Tawang, Benteng station, and Kalimas
- Indocement Cement Freight, between Nambo, Arjawinangun, Brambanan, and Kalimas station
- Container and Steel Coil Freight, between Krenceng and Kalimas station

== See also ==
- Rajawali–Cikampek railway
- Cikampek–Padalarang railway
- Cikampek–Cirebon Prujakan railway
