= Semarang Tawang railway station =

Railway station in Indonesia

Semarang Tawang Bank Jateng Station Stasiun Semarang Tawang Bank Jateng
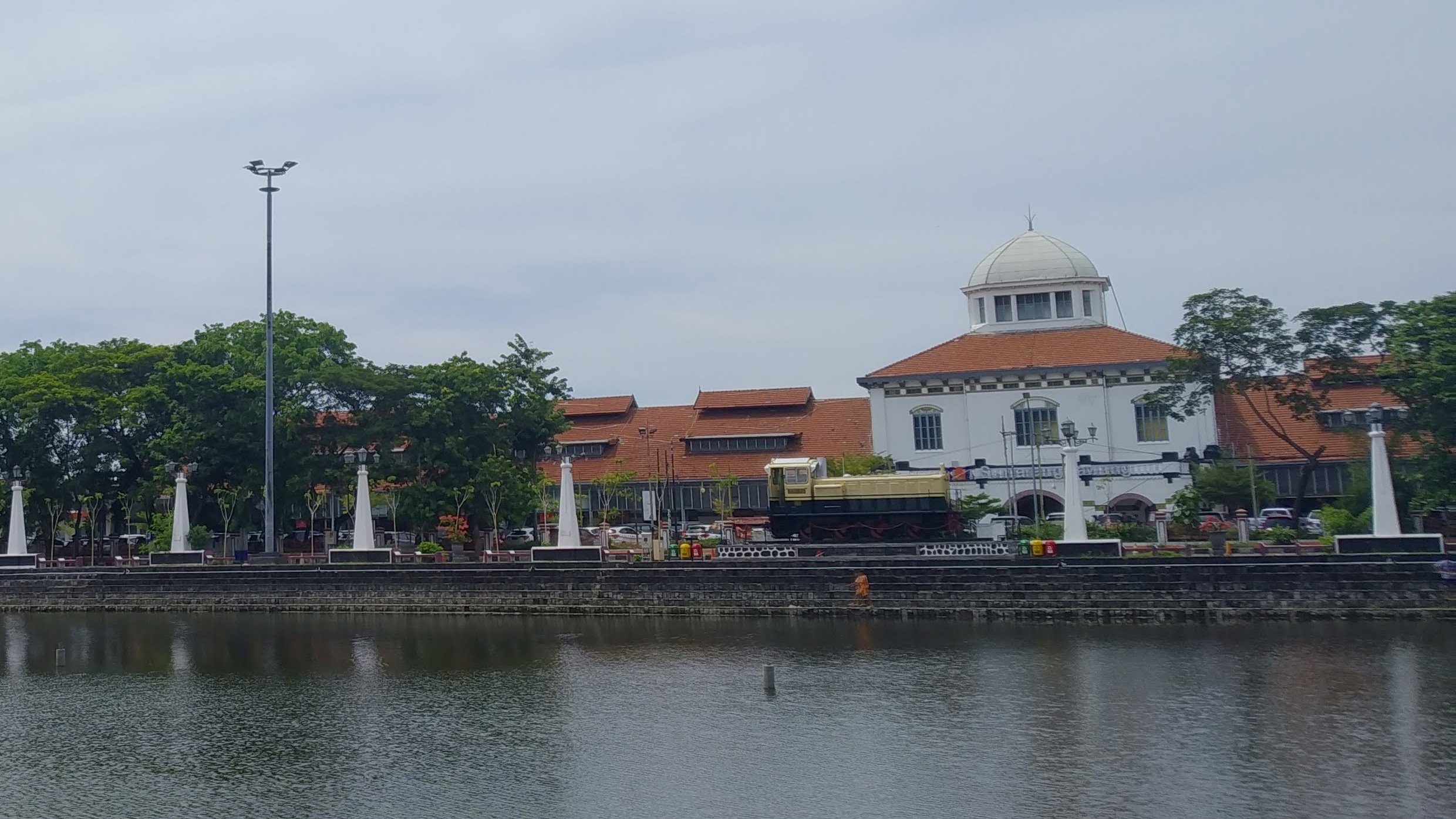
- Station from across the polder Tawang (Tawang pond)

General information
- Other names: Tawang Station
- Location: Jl. Taman Tawang 1, Tanjung Mas, North Semarang, Semarang; Central Java; Indonesia
- Coordinates: 6°57′52″S 110°25′40″E
- Elevation: +2 m (6.6 ft)
- Owner: Kereta Api Indonesia
- Operator: Kereta Api Indonesia
- Lines: Tegal–Brumbung; Semarang Tawang–Surabaya Pasarturi
- Platforms: 1 side platform 2 island platforms
- Tracks: 8
- Connections: Trans Semarang: 2 3A 3B 4 7; Trans Jateng: K1

Construction
- Parking: Available
- Accessible: Available
- Architect: L.C.L.W. Sloth-Blaauboer
- Architectural style: New Indies style

Other information
- Station code: SMT • 2530
- Classification: Large type A

History
- Opened: 1 June 1914; 112 years ago

Services
Preceding station	Kereta Api Indonesia	Following station
Semarang Poncol Terminus	Kedungsepur	Alastua towards Ngrombo
Location
- Location within Semarang

Semarang Tawang Station (SMT), officially Semarang Tawang Bank Jateng Station under naming rights sponsorship, is a large type A class railway station in Tanjung Mas, North Semarang, Semarang, Central Java, Indonesia. The station, which is located at an altitude +2 m, is included in Operational Area IV Semarang and the largest station in Semarang and North Central Java. The station is the oldest major railway station in Indonesia after Semarang Gudang Station and opened on 19 July 1868 on the Semarang Tawang–Tanggung railway. All trains that go through the North Java line stop at this station except Jayabaya, Kertajaya, and cargo trains.

Because of the rapid development and improper city planning of the coastal city of Semarang, Tawang station is frequently flooded by heavy rainfall, rising sea levels, and the loss of catchment areas north of the station. This impacts railway operations on northern railway connections.

== History ==
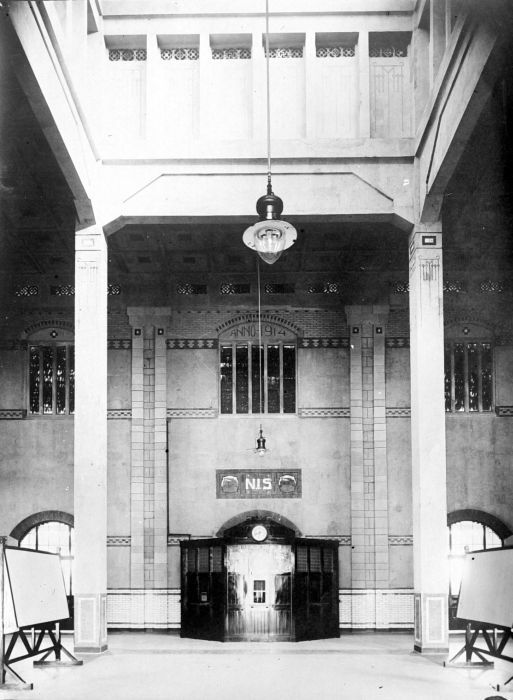
The hall of Semarang Tawang station when it was still managed by the NIS (c. 1910-1920).

In 1911, the Nederlandsch-Indische Spoorweg Maatschappij (NIS) began to draw up a master plan for the railway system on the Semarang–Surakarta–Yogyakarta railway line which was previously inaugurated in 1873. This happened because Samarang NIS Station, which had been closed six years earlier, made it impossible to operate again as the NIS central station if Semarang was hit by tidal floods. In carrying out the master plan, NIS started building a new train station in the Tawang area which was built on 29 April 1911. This station was completed and inaugurated on 1 June 1914.

Even though it has been built, Semarang Tawang Station often experiences tidal flooding. This happens because the Java Sea often experiences high tides and mixes with rainwater and waste water originating from several waterways so that the station's height drops to 0 m. In solving this problem, the Semarang City Government established a polder in front of the station which was built in 1998.

== Building and layout ==
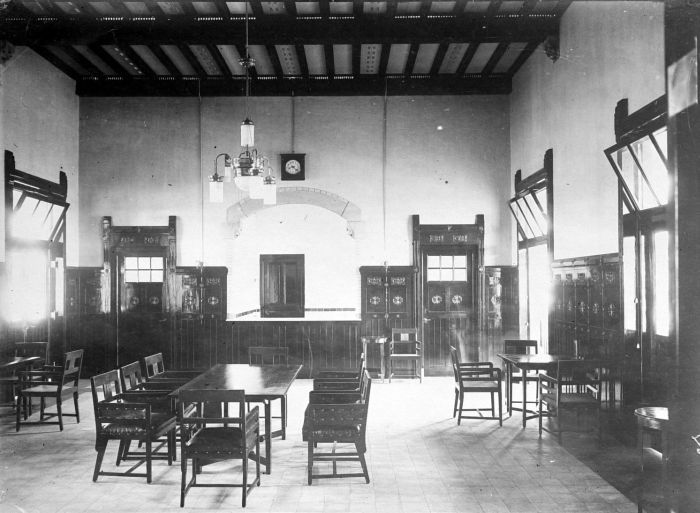
The VIP waiting room of the station (c. 1910-1920)

The Indies-style station building was designed by Ir. Louis Cornelis Lambertus Willem Sloth-Blaauboer. This station is classified as a side station; extends along the axis of the railroad track. The shape of the building mass is a combination of cubes and beams, and the roof is in the form of a rectangular pyramid in the main lobby and triangular prisms on both sides. The roof of the lobby building is crowned with a dome so that it gives the impression of being majestic, firm and solid which is characteristic of Indian architecture. The roof of the main station building which is the main focus of this station is made of tile, while the canopy of the station platform uses a tin roof supported by steel pillars. The wall thickness of the station is 30 cm and the supports are thickened 50 cm to strengthen the construction. The doors and windows are ornamented in the form of rolaag brick construction, which is connected with ornate ceramic glazing, giving the building an artistic impression.

Semarang Tawang Station initially had five train lines with track 4 being a straight line. After the double track to Alastua Station was officially operational on 5 December 2013 and to Semarang Poncol Station on 7 February 2014, the number of lines increased to eight and line 5 was also used as a straight line. Lines 1 and 2 are used as intercity train stop lines for boarding and dropping passengers, line 3 is used as the arrival and departure points for intercity trains that start their journey from this station and is used for parking a series of trains, line 6 is used as a place for crossing and following trains, and lines 7 and 8 are also used as a parking lot for the train series as well as a washing place for the train series. At the eastern end of lines 6 and 7—close to Jalan Ronggowarsito—there is a place for loading and unloading containers.

Even though this station is a large station, this station still uses a low-sized platform, while a high-sized platform is only available on line 1 which is used to make it easier for passengers to get on and off and accommodate passengers with disabilities.

In 2019, the track layout at the station underwent a minor overhaul and the old electrical signaling system has been replaced with the latest one by Len Industri.

== Services ==
The following is a list of train services at the Semarang Tawang Station

=== Passenger services ===
==== Executive class ====
- Argo Bromo Anggrek to Gambir and Surabaya Pasar Turi
- Argo Muria from and to Gambir
- Argo Sindoro from and to Gambir
- Brawijaya to Gambir and Malang via Solo-Madiun
- Sembrani to Gambir and Surabaya Pasar Turi
- Argo Anjasmoro to Gambir and Surabaya Pasarturi
- Pandalungan to Gambir and Jember
- Argo Merbabu from and to Gambir

==== Mixed class ====
- Brantas to Pasar Senen and Blitar via Solo–Madiun (regular: executive-economy, additional: business-economy plus)
- Harina to Bandung via Cikampek and Surabaya Pasar Turi (executive-premium economy)
- Gumarang to Pasar Senen and Surabaya Pasar Turi (executive-business)
- Dharmawangsa to Pasar Senen and Surabaya Pasar Turi (executive-economy)
- Ciremai from and to Bandung via Cikampek (executive-business)
- Kamandaka from and to Purwokerto via Tegal (executive-economy plus)
- Joglosemarkerto, looping trains in Central Java and The Special Region of Yogyakarta (executive-economy plus class) to:
  - Tegal continued Solo Balapan–Semarang Tawang via Purwokerto–Yogyakarta
  - Solo Balapan continued Yogyakarta
- Gunungjati train to Gambir (Executive and Economy)
- Banyubiru from and to Solo Balapan (Executive and Economy)

==== Premium Economy class ====
- Maharani to Semarang Poncol and Surabaya Pasar Turi

==== Economy Plus class ====
- Majapahit to Pasar Senen and Malang via Solo–Madiun
- Menoreh from and to Pasar Senen

==== Economy class ====
- Matarmaja to Pasar Senen and Malang via Solo–Madiun

==== Local/Commuter train ====
- Blora Jaya Express to Semarang Poncol and Cepu
- Kedung Sepur to Semarang Poncol and Ngrombo

== Supporting transportation ==
Type	Route	Destination
Trans Semarang	2	Sisemut Bus Terminal–Terboyo Wetan
Trans Semarang	3A	Port of Tanjung Emas Loop Line (clockwise via Dr. Cipto Mangunkusumo St. and Gajah Mada St.)
Trans Semarang	3B	Port of Tanjung Emas Loop Line via Elizabeth (counter-clockwise via Letjen Suprapto St. (Kota Lama Semarang), Imam Bonjol St., and Pandanaran St.)
Trans Semarang	4	Cangkringan Bus Terminal–Semarang Tawang Station
Trans Semarang	7	Terboyo Wetan–Pemuda Balai Kota–Terboyo Wetan (Loop Line)
Trans Jateng id	K1	Bawen Bus Terminal–Semarang Tawang Station

== Gallery ==
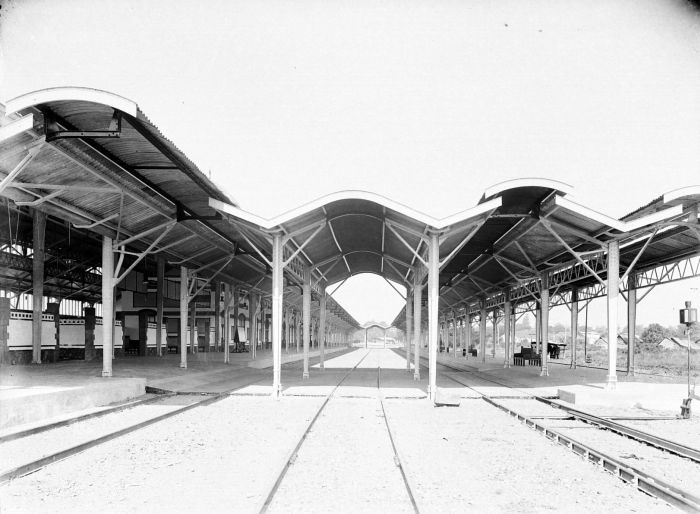
The platform of Semarang Tawang Station (c. 1920‐1940)

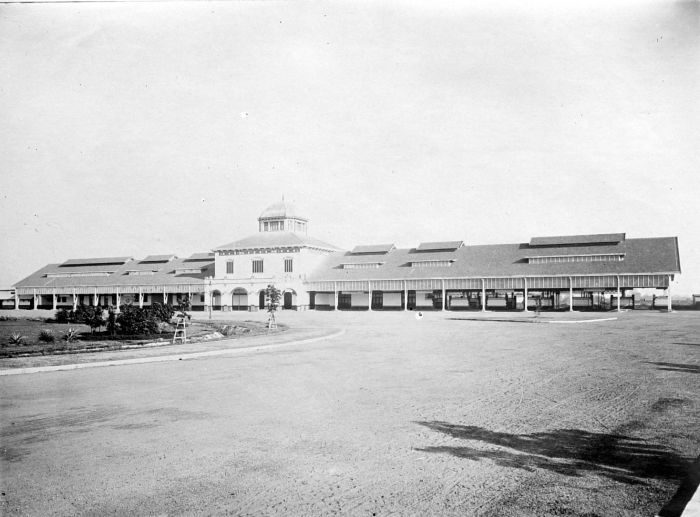
The building of the station (c. 1910s)

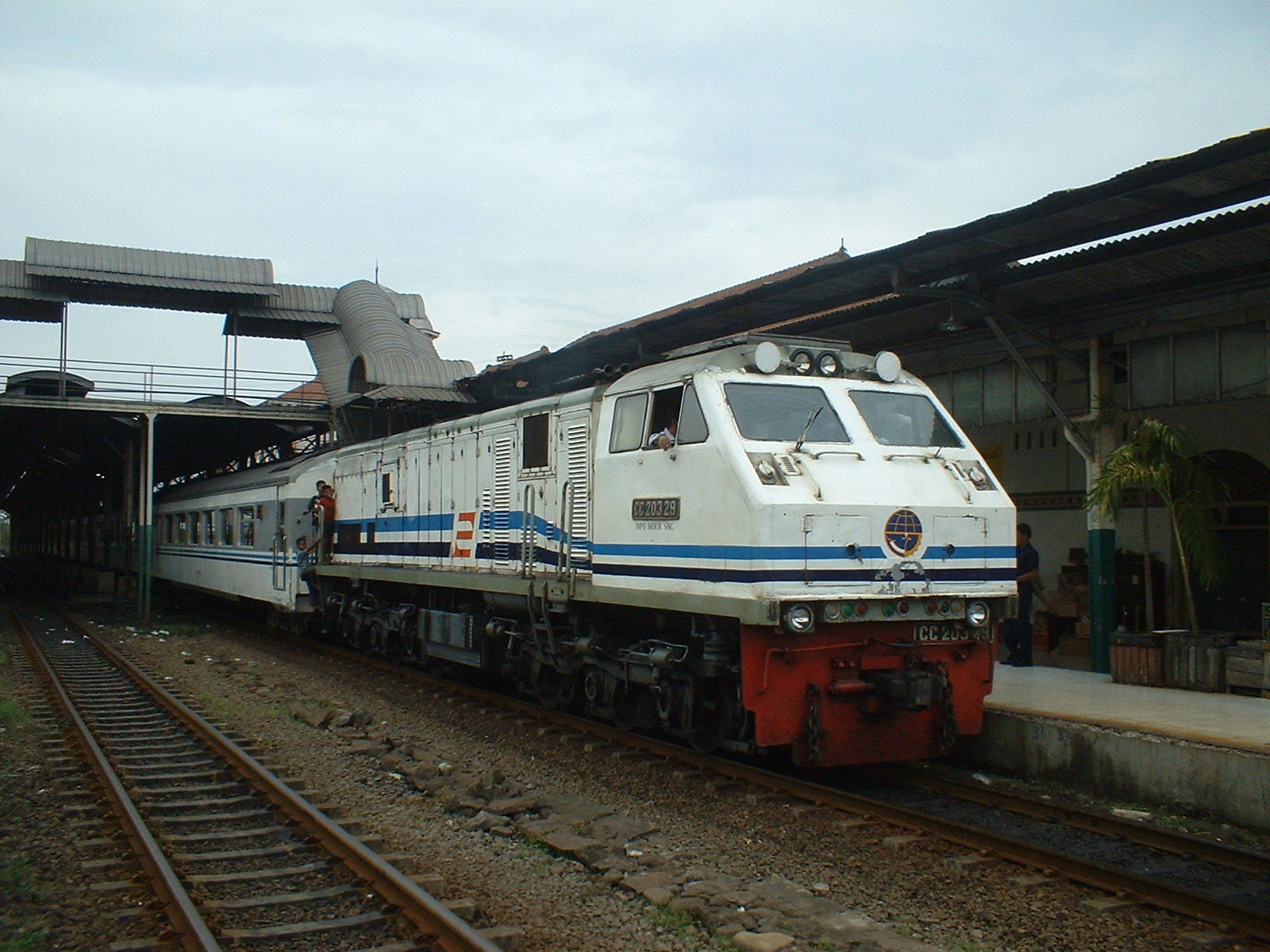
Argo Muria train pulled by locomotive CC203 29 (CC 203 98 17) while waiting for departure at Semarang Tawang Station, 2006

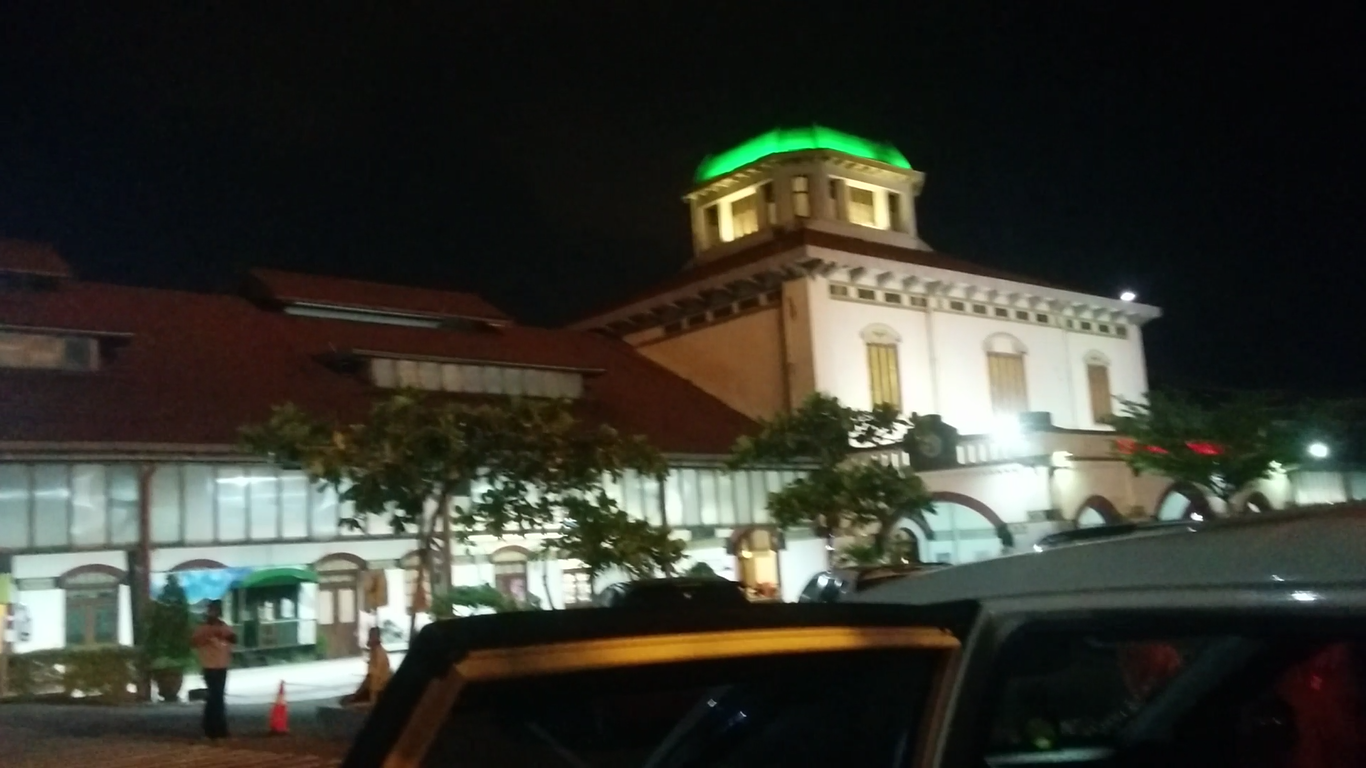
The building of the station at night (2017)

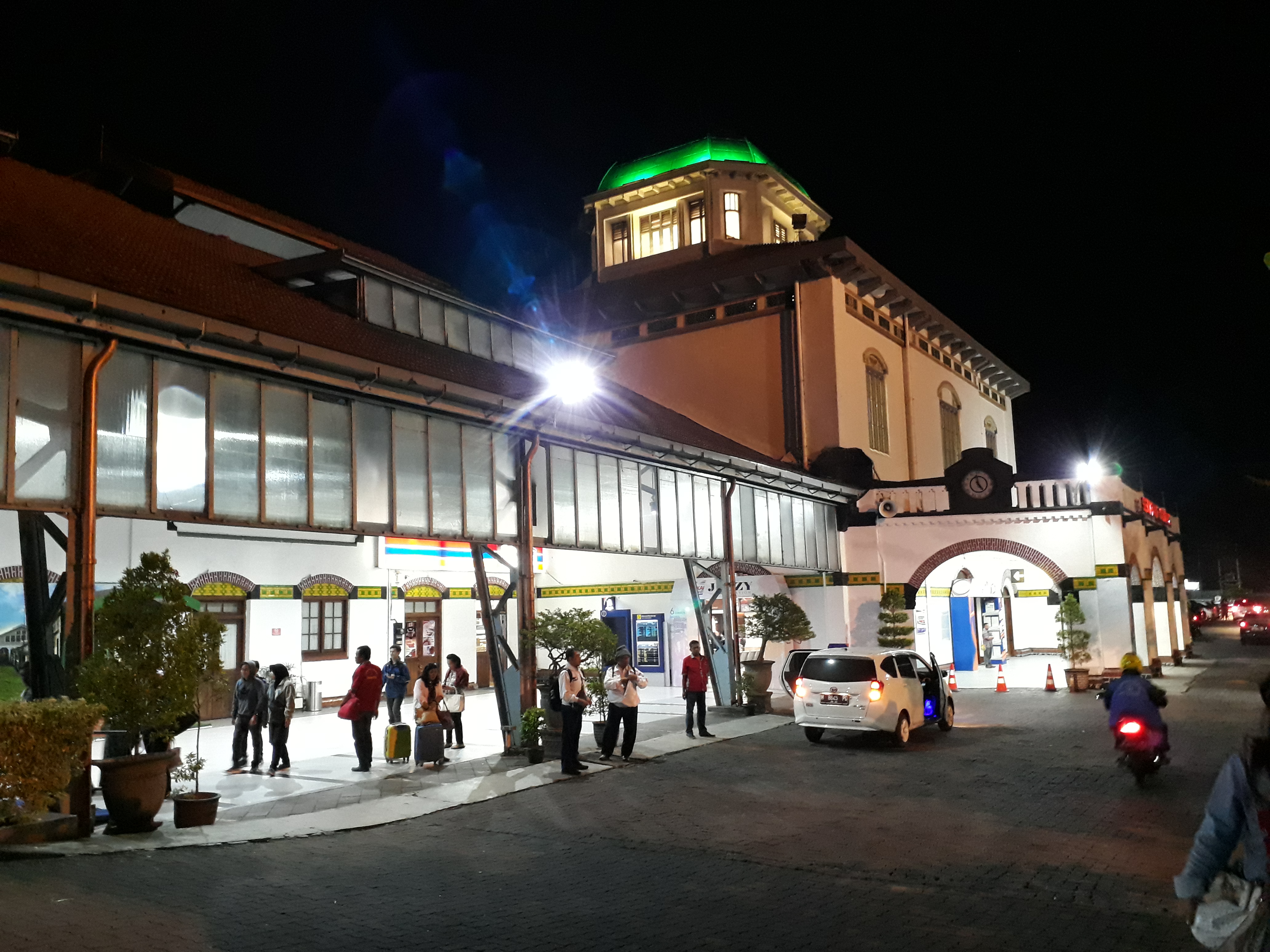
The station at early morning (2017)

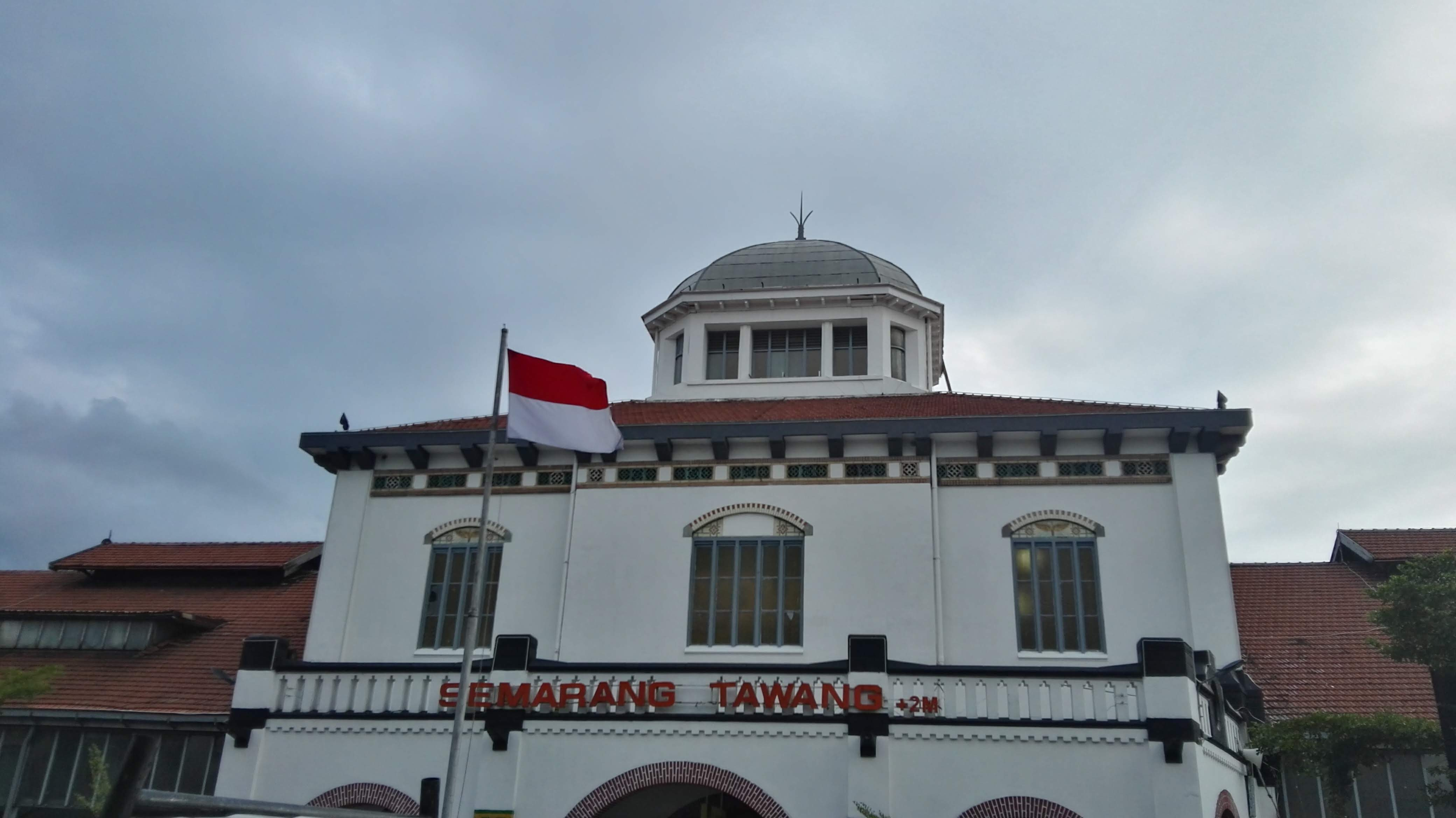
The front facade of the station (2018)

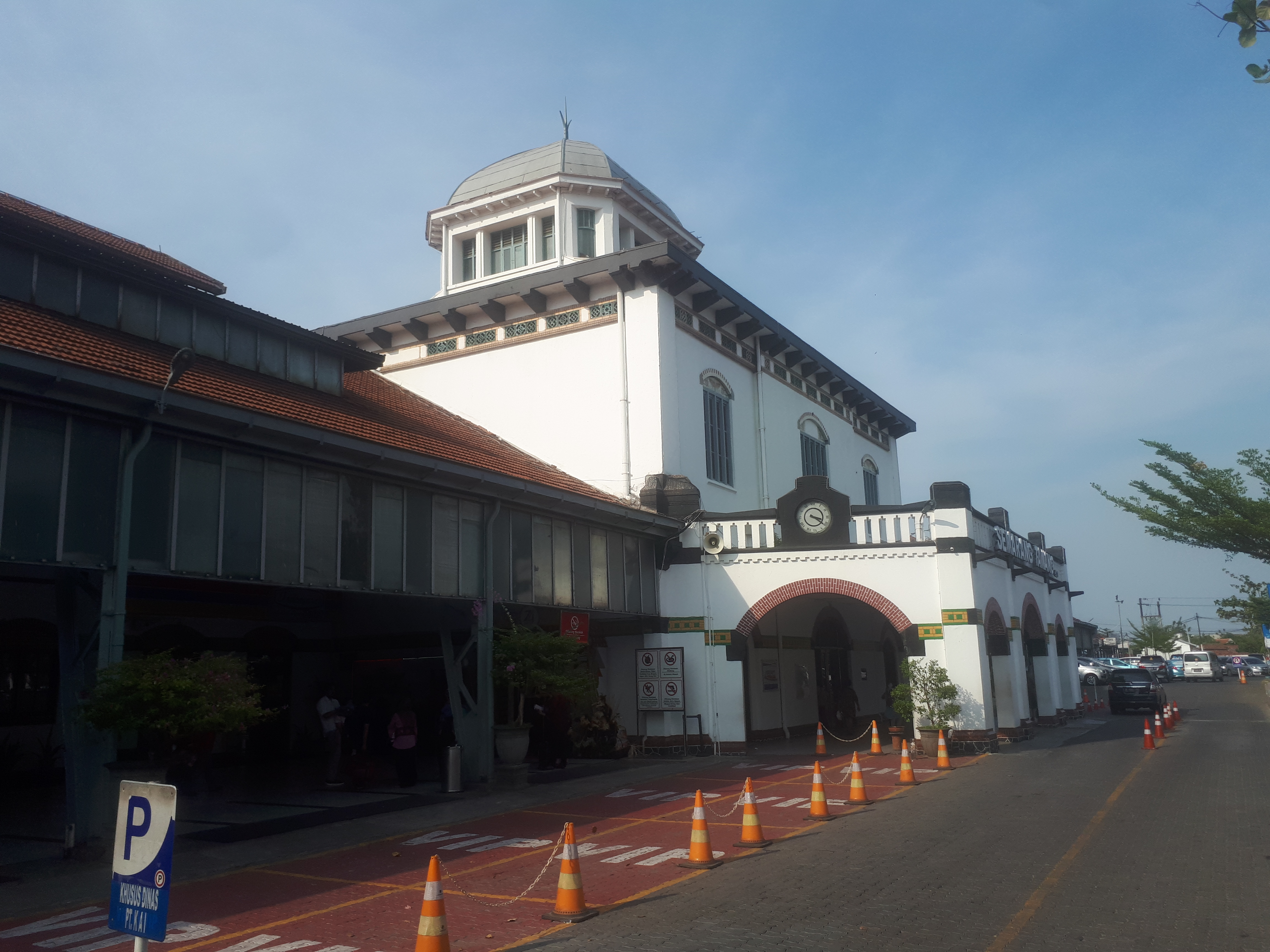
The front facade of the station seen from the west (2019)

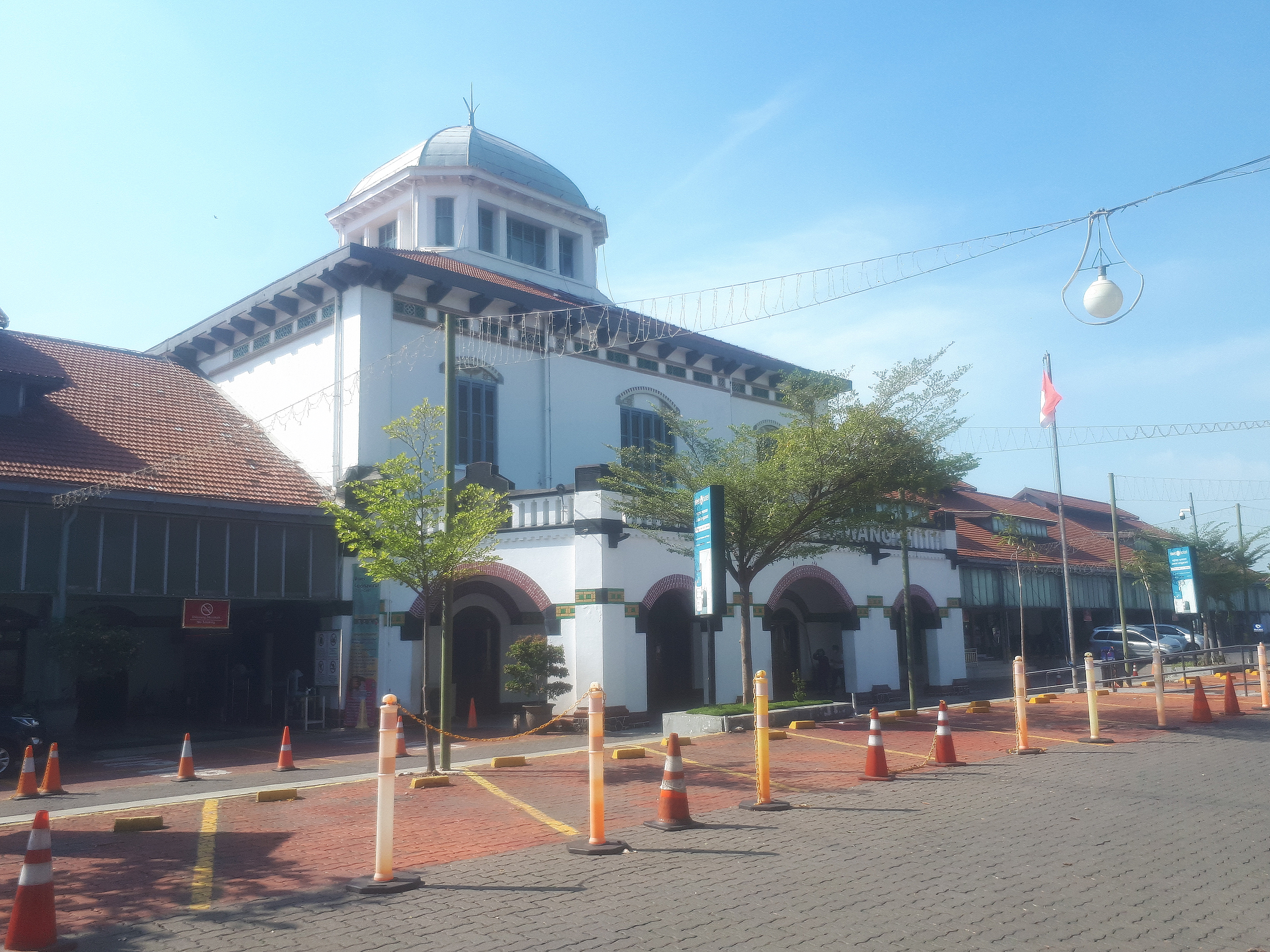
The front view of the station (2020)

Preceding station	Kereta Api Indonesia	Following station
Semarang Poncol towards Tegal	Tegal–Brumbung	Alastua towards Brumbung
Terminus	Semarang–Surabaya Pasar turi	Alastua towards Surabaya Pasar Turi
