= Tawang Jaya =

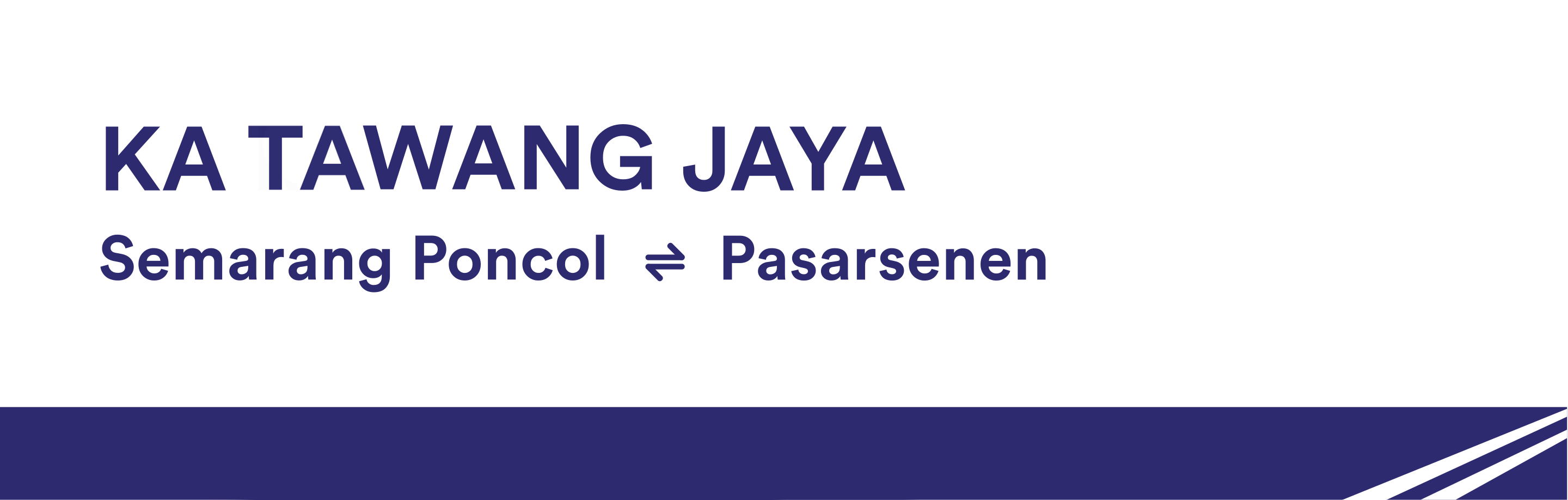

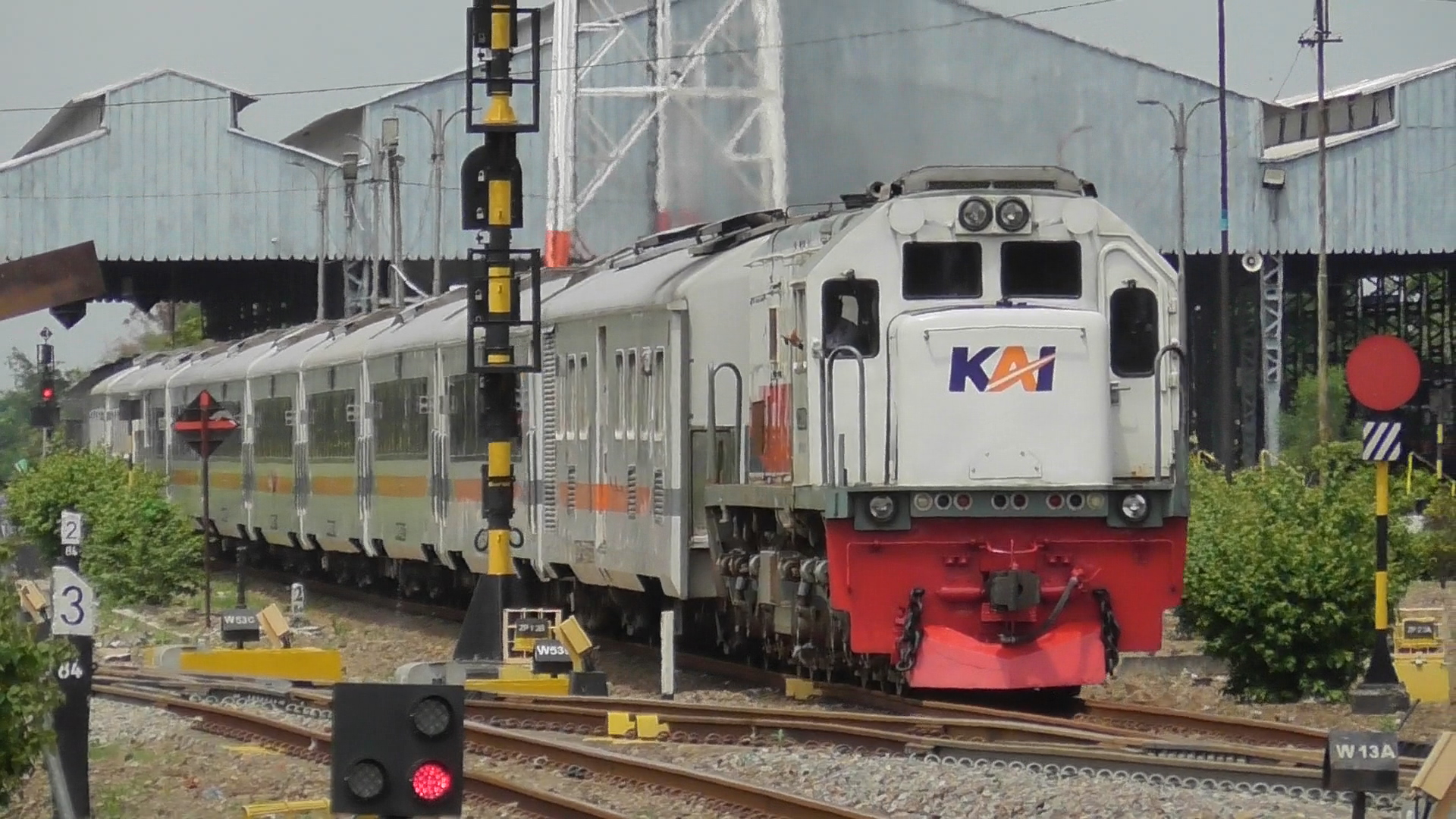
- Tawang Jaya Premium heading to Semarang Tawang, 2024

Overview
- Service type: Inter-city rail
- Status: Operational
- Locale: Operational Area IV Semarang
- First service: 14 May 1984 (Tawang Jaya Economy); 06 April 2018 (Tawang Jaya Premium)
- Current operator: Kereta Api Indonesia

Route
- Termini: Pasar Senen; Semarang Poncol/Semarang Tawang
- Distance travelled: 437–439 kilometres (272–273 miles)
- Average journey time: 5 hours 51 minutes (Tawang Jaya Premium); 5 hours 55 minutes (Tawang Jaya)
- Service frequency: daily each way
- Train numbers: 178-180 (Tawang Jaya Premium); 259-260 (Tawang Jaya)

On-board services
- Classes: economy (Tawang Jaya); executive and economy (Tawang Jaya Premium)
- Seating arrangements: 80 seats arranged 2-2 (economy class); 50 seats arranged 2-2 (executive class)
- Catering facilities: On-board cafe and trolley service

Technical
- Rolling stock: CC206; CC203; CC201
- Track gauge: 1,067 mm
- Operating speed: 80–120 kilometres per hour (50–75 mph)
Route map

Tawang Jaya (Indonesian: Kereta Api Tawang Jaya) is a train service running between Pasar Senen and Semarang Poncol, in Java, Indonesia.

The Tawang Jaya train series operates two scheduled train services: Tawang Jaya (economy class) and Tawang Jaya Premium (executive and economy class).

== Station list ==
=== Tawang Jaya ===
As of 2025, the service calls at the following stations:

- Pasar Senen (start/end)
- Jatinegara (only bound from Semarang Poncol)
- Bekasi
- Cikarang
- Haurgeulis
- Jatibarang
- Cirebon Prujakan
- Babakan
- Brebes
- Tegal
- Pemalang
- Pekalongan
- Weleri
- Semarang Poncol (start/end)

=== Tawang Jaya Premium ===
As of 2025, the service calls at the following stations:

- Pasar Senen (start/end)
- Jatinegara (only bound to Semarang Tawang)
- Bekasi
- Cikarang
- Pegaden Baru
- Jatibarang
- Cirebon
- Brebes
- Tegal
- Pemalang
- Pekalongan
- Weleri
- Semarang Poncol
- Semarang Tawang (start/end)

== Incident ==
On 21 January 2020, the Tawang Jaya train derailed at km 9+9 on the Jatinegara-Pasar Senen section, which resulted in the train journey being hampered.
