= Semarang Poncol railway station =

Railway station in Indonesia

Semarang Poncol Station Stasiun Semarang Poncol
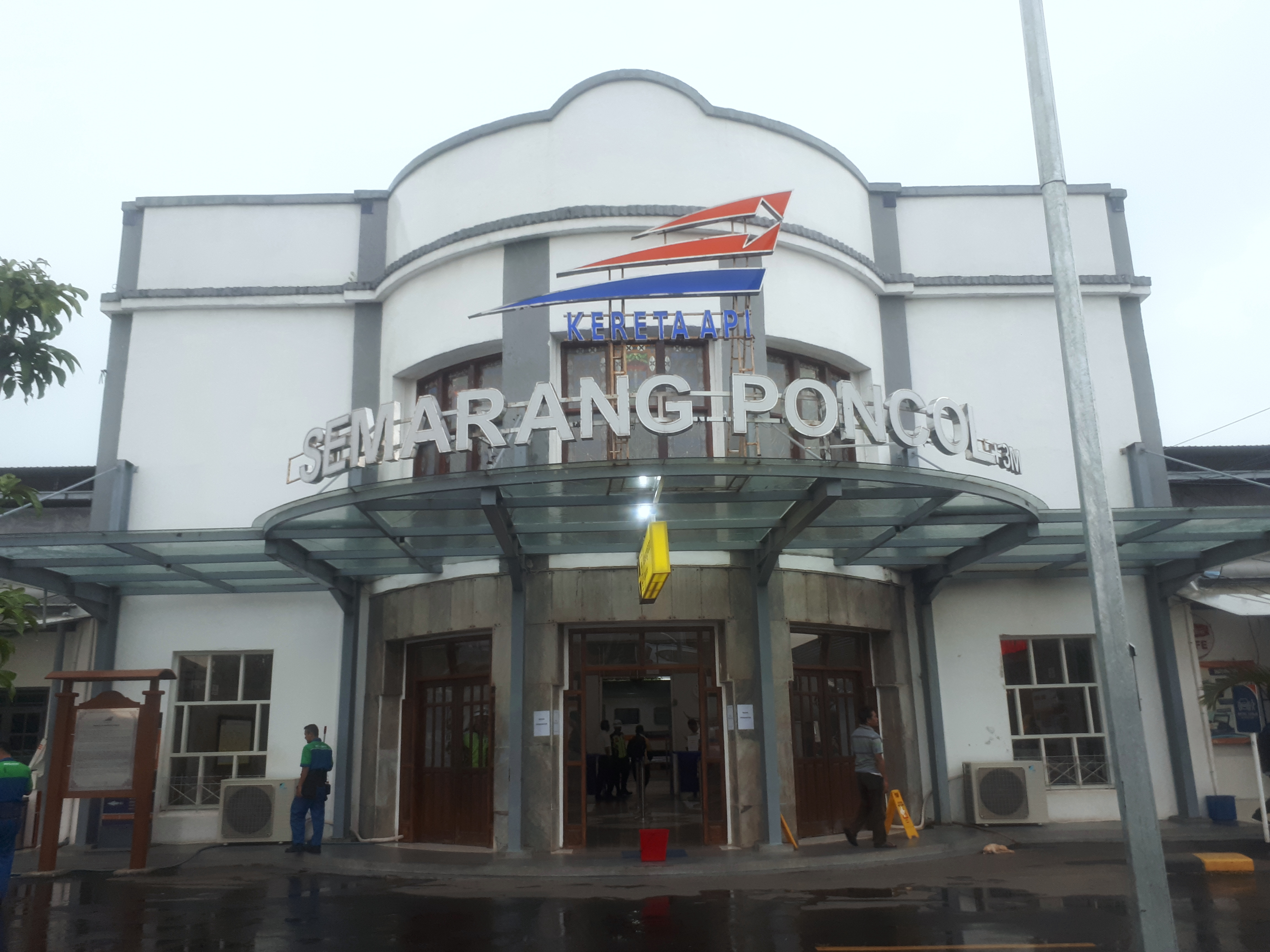
- The entrance of Semarang Poncol Station

General information
- Other names: Poncol Station
- Location: Jl Imam Bonjol, Purwosari, North Semarang, Semarang; Central Java; Indonesia
- Coordinates: 6.9729°S 110.4147°E
- Elevation: +3 m (9.8 ft)
- Owner: Kereta Api Indonesia
- Operator: Kereta Api Indonesia
- Line: Tegal–Brumbung
- Platforms: 1 side platform 3 island platforms
- Tracks: 9
- Connections: Trans Semarang: 3A 3B 4 7; Trans Jateng: K1

Construction
- Structure type: Ground
- Parking: Available
- Accessible: Available
- Architect: Henri Maclaine Pont
- Architectural style: Art deco

Other information
- Station code: SMC • 2520
- Classification: Large type B

History
- Opened: 6 August 1914
- Former names: Pontjol Semarang Station; Semarang-West Station; Semarang SCS Station
- Original company: Semarang–Cheribon Stoomtram Maatschappij

Services
| Preceding station | Kereta Api Indonesia | Following station |
|---|---|---|
| Terminus | Kedungsepur | Semarang Tawang towards Ngrombo |
Location
- Location within Semarang

Semarang Poncol Station (SMC) is a historic railway station in Purwosari, North Semarang, Semarang, Indonesia. The station which is located at an altitude of +3 meters is included in the Semarang Operational Area IV and is the second main station in Semarang after Semarang Tawang Station. It was built in 1914 and is considered an early example of Art Deco architecture.

== History ==
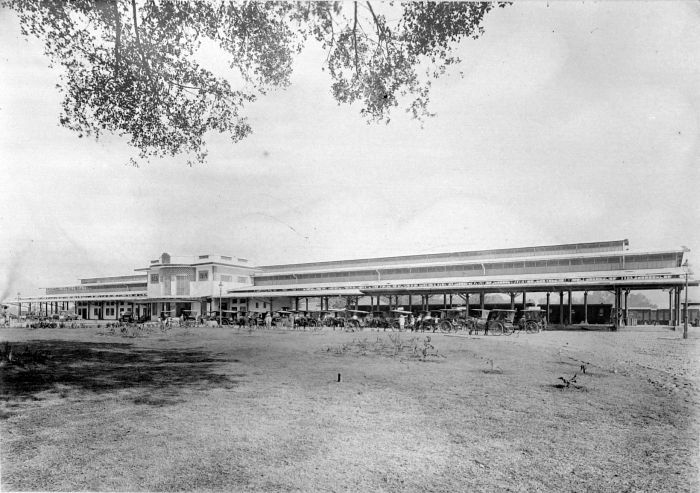
The Semarang Poncol station after its opening in 1914. Possibly c. 1915-1920

Semarang–Cheribon Stoomtram Maatschappij (SCS) was established in 1895 and received a permit concession from the Dutch East Indies Colonial Government to build a railway line from Semarang to Cirebon. This company had an office in Tegal, and started building its railroad in 1895 until it was finally completed in 1897. SCS focused on the transportation of passengers and goods (particularly sugar, petroleum and fertilizer) on the Semarang–Pekalongan–Tegal–Cirebon line.

To reduce the accumulation of passengers and goods in Semarang, a large station was needed. SCS had its own station, namely Semarang SCS or Semarang-West; likewise in Cirebon, there was the Cirebon SCS. The Semarang SCS Station building was inaugurated on 6 August 1914 designed by architect Henri Maclaine Pont, a Dutch architect. This station was built to replace the existing Pendrikan Station function. Unlike Pont's first work (the SCS Tegal Office—which did not have anything special in terms of architecture), this Pont's work took part in the Paris Exposition International Forum in France, 1925. In the past, this station was separated by a rail line from Semarang Tawang Station at a distance of 2.5 km.

After the Djawatan Kereta Api (Railways Department) made a list of stations throughout Indonesia in the 1950s, the Semarang-West Station was then given the name Semarang Poncol.

== Building and layout ==
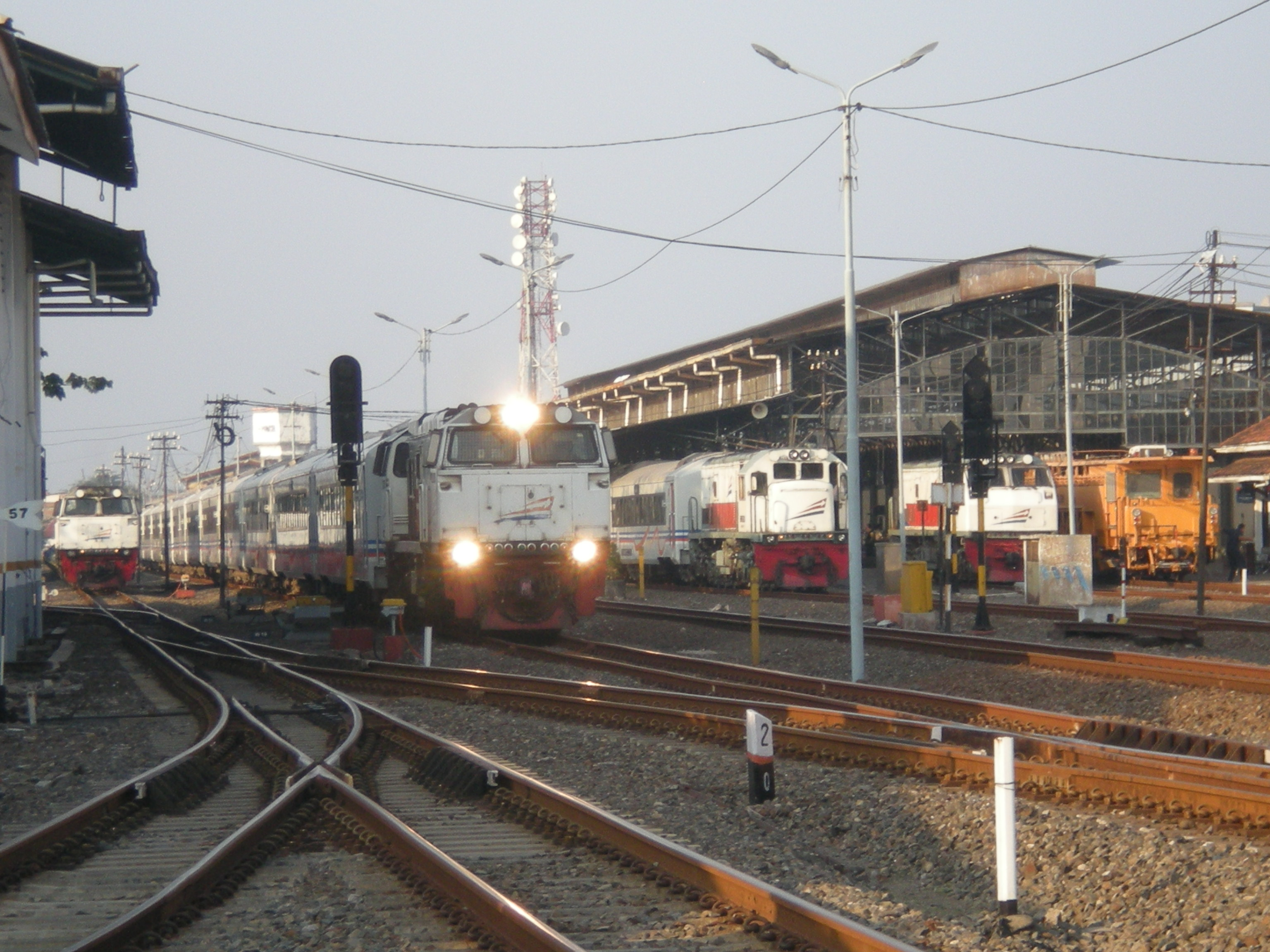
The emplacement of the station with the Argo Mulia train passing through, 2017

Semarang Poncol Station has nine train lines with lines 1-3 which are shaded by a canopy. Initially, line 4 was a straight line. After the double track on the compartment between this station eastward to Tawang Station was put into operation on 7 February 2014 and then westward to Jerakah Station on 28 March 2014, the line layout at this station underwent a slight revamp and line 5 was also used as a straight line.

To the northeast and southwest of the station, respectively, there is a locomotive depot and a train depot which are used to store and maintain locomotives and passenger trains with a terminus in the city of Semarang. The station building has been renovated several times so that its shape is different from its original form.

In 2019, the old electrical signaling system at this station was replaced with the latest output signal produced by PT Len Industri. In addition, the railroad track between this station and Semarang Tawang Station is used as a double track.

== Services ==
The following is a list of train services at the Semarang Poncol station

=== Passenger services ===
==== Mixed class ====
- Jayabaya, destination of Pasar Senen and Malang via Surabaya Pasar Turi (executive-economy)
- Ciremai, destination of Semarang Tawang and Bandung (executive-business)
- Kamandaka, destination of Semarang Tawang and Purwokerto via Tegal (executive-economy)
- Joglosemarkerto, (executive-economy) looping train Central Java and the Special Region of Yogyakarta class executive-economy with destinations:
  - Solo Balapan via Semarang Tawang-Gundih
  - Solo Balapan via Tegal-Purwokerto-Yogyakarta

==== Economy class ====
- Kertajaya, destination of Pasar Senen and Surabaya Pasar Turi
- Tawang Jaya, destination of Pasar Senen
- Maharani, destination of Surabaya Pasar Turi
- Ambarawa Express, destination of Surabaya Pasar Turi
- Kaligung, destination of Tegal-Brebes-Cirebon Prujakan
- Blora Jaya Express, destination of Cepu
- Airlangga, destination of Surabaya Pasarturi and Pasar Senen

==== Commuter ====
- Kedung Sepur, destination of Ngrombo

=== Freight services ===
- Freight container, destination of Jakarta (Tanjung Priuk or Jakarta Gudang) and Surabaya (Kalimas) or Gresik (Indro)
- Indocement, destination of Nambo and Kalimas, Brambanan, Ketapang
- Cement, destination of Arjawinangun and Solo Balapan

== Supporting transportation ==
| Type | Route | Destination |
|---|---|---|
| Trans Semarang | 3A | Port of Tanjung Emas Loop Line (clockwise via Dr. Cipto Mangunkusumo St. and Gajah Mada St.) |
| Trans Semarang | 3B | Port of Tanjung Emas Loop Line via Elizabeth (counter-clockwise via Letjen Suprapto St. (Kota Lama Semarang), Imam Bonjol St., and Pandanaran St.) |
| Trans Semarang | 4 | Cangkringan Bus Terminal–Semarang Tawang Station |
| Trans Semarang | 7 | Terboyo Wetan–Pemuda Balai Kota–Terboyo Wetan (Loop Line) |
| Trans Jateng id | K1 | Bawen Bus Terminal–Semarang Tawang Station |

== Gallery ==
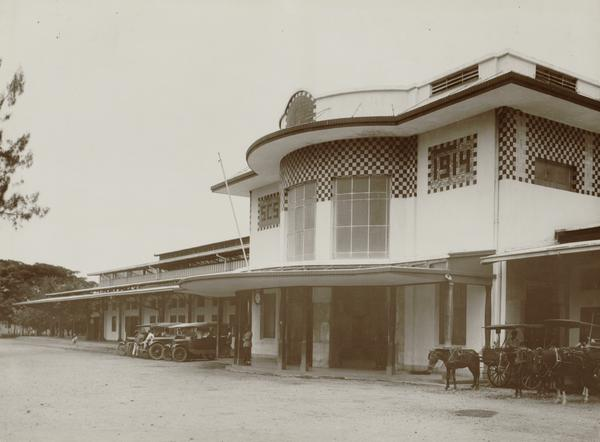
The entrance of the station c. 1920s

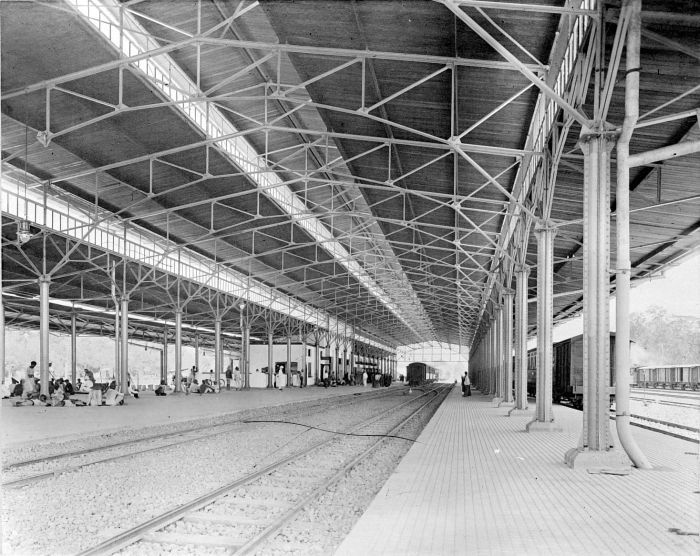
Interior of Semarang-West (Pontjol) railway station (c. 1915-1920)

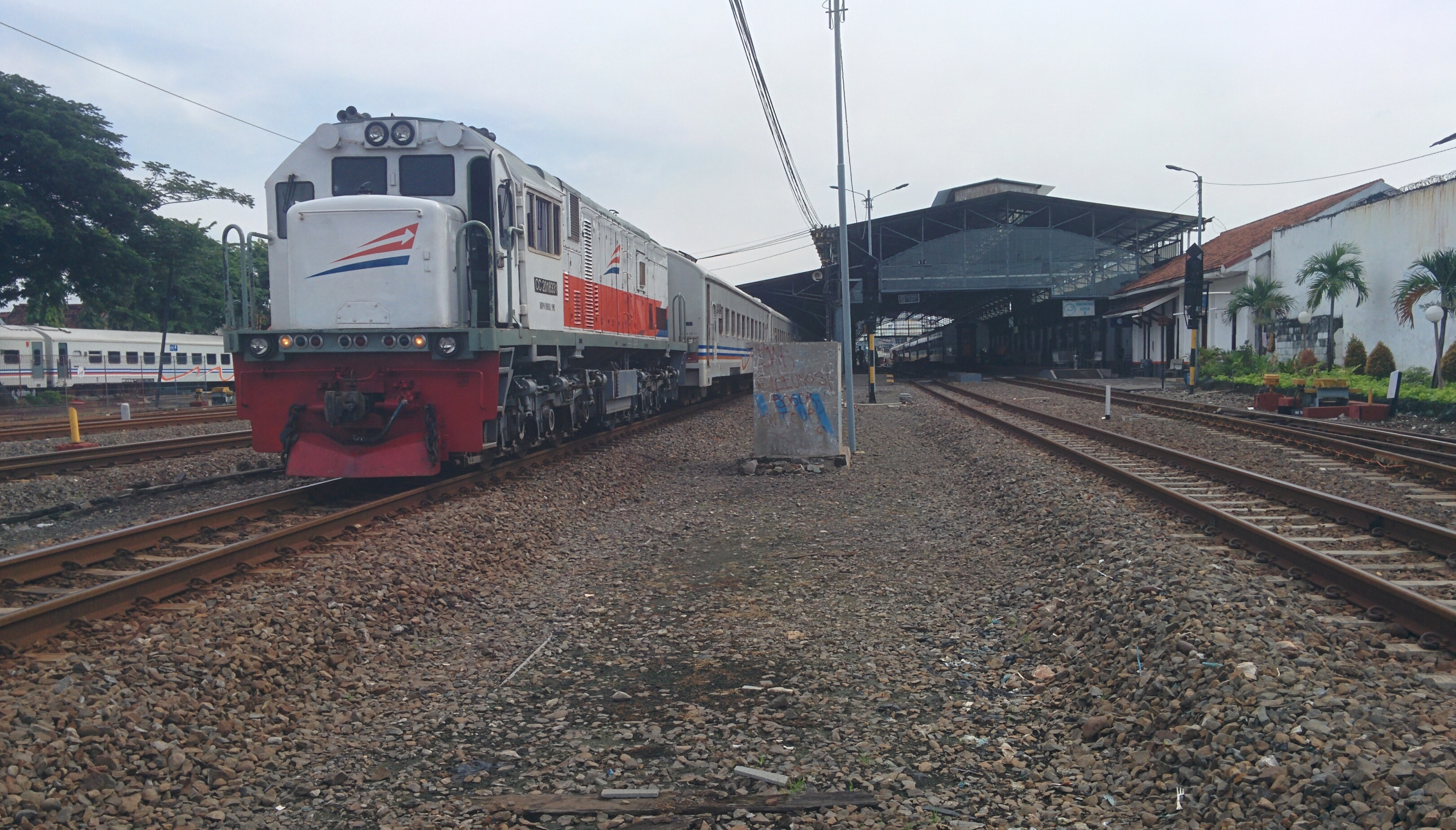
The Kaligung train waiting for departure at the station (2016)

| Preceding station | Kereta Api Indonesia | Following station |
|---|---|---|
| Jerakah towards Tegal | Tegal–Brumbung | Semarang Tawang towards Brumbung |
