= Trans Semarang =

Indonesian transportation system

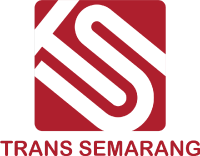

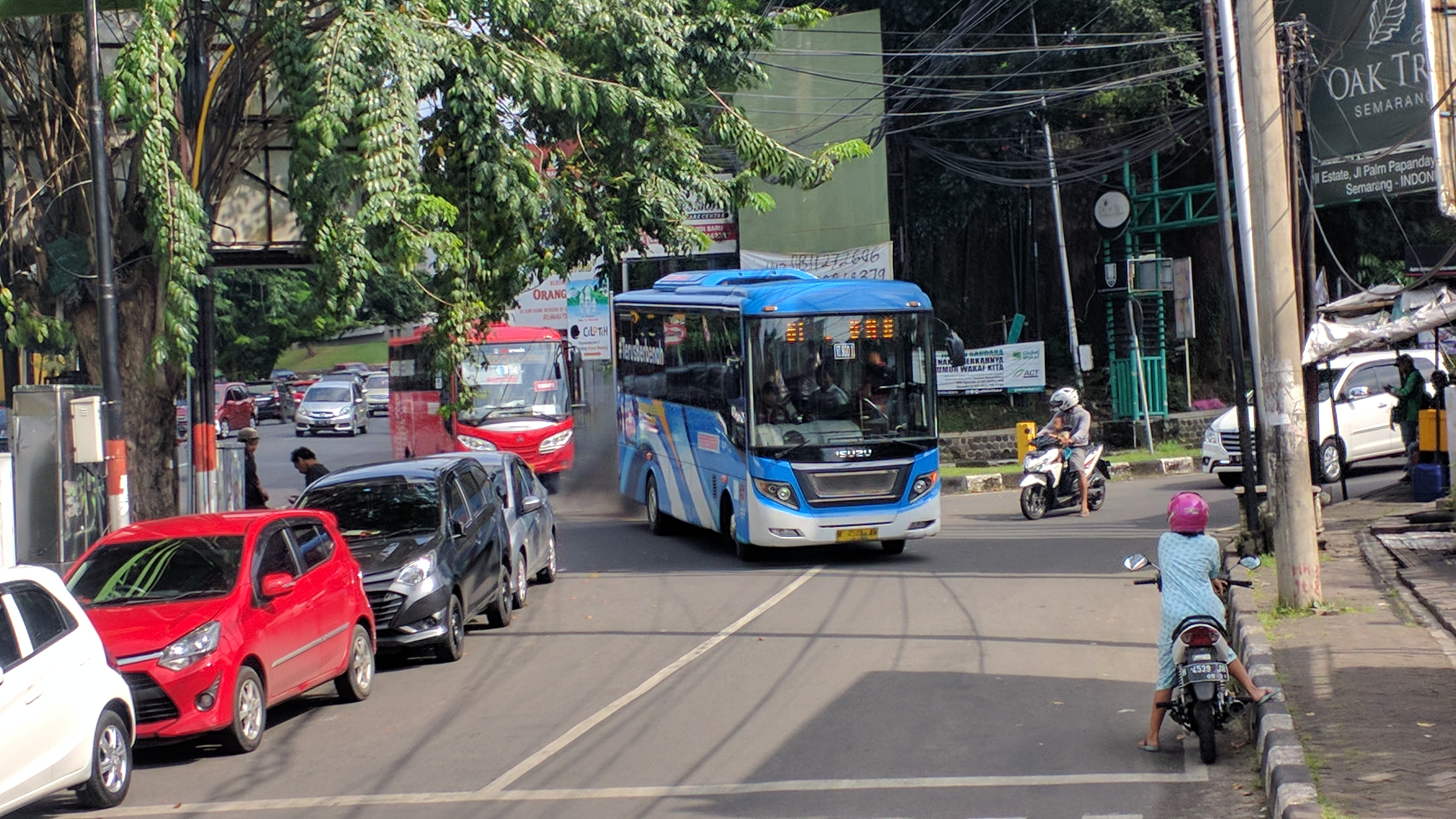
- Founded: 18 September 2009; 16 years ago (as consortium PT Trans Semarang); 1 October 2010 (as a part of BLU UPTD Terminal Mangkang); 1 October 2016 (as BLU BRT Kota Semarang); 3 January 2017 (as BLU UPTD Trans Semarang)
- Headquarters: Semarang City Transportation, Communication and Information Office; Jl. Tambak Aji Raya No. 5, Semarang, Central Java, Indonesia
- Locale: Semarang
- Service area: Semarang and Semarang Regency
- Service type: Bus rapid transit
- Routes: 8 main corridor, 1 special corridor, dan 3 feeder corridor
- Daily ridership: 33.000 (2019)
- Fuel type: Gas power within Diesels (rotation gasoline system)
- Operator: BLU UPTD Trans Semarang (Government of Semarang City, system owner) and several bus operators
- Head BLU: Hendrix Setiawan
- Website: transsemarang.semarangkota.go.id

Trans Semarang (popularly known as BRT Trans Semarang or simply BRT) is a Bus rapid transit system in Semarang City and (partly) Semarang Regency, Central Java, Indonesia. The service is aim to break down congestion in Semarang and to accommodate commuters to the city center and tourist destinations in the city. One that distinguishes Trans Semarang from other city bus services is its high-deck fleet so that service users use special shelters (except for feeder services).

Trans Semarang is managed by the Public Service Agency – Technical Implementation Unit (BLU UPTD) Trans Semarang (usually just called BLU Trans Semarang) under the Semarang City Transportation, Communication and Information Office, especially in terms of recruiting non-resident workers.

Trans Semarang is one of the public transportation services provided by the Semarang city government and is widely used by residents of Semarang and its surroundings in traveling due to relatively affordable fares, punctuality, and its air-cooled fleet. Trans Semarang operates (on average) from 05.30–17.40 WIB (calculated from the first departure and last departure from each pool/terminus), except for the Airport Corridor which operates from 17.30–00.00 WIB.

== History ==
=== General ===
The discourse on the operation of Trans Semarang was presented by the Transportation Department of Semarang City on 22 December 2008, with the establishment of the consortium and the trial of corridor 1 on 2 May 2009, to coincide with the 462nd anniversary of Semarang City. Full operation commenced on 18 September 2009 with diben for the consortium of PT Trans Semarang (from Perum DAMRI, PO Minas, and PO Ratakencana) and the bus asset rental system between the Semarang City government and the consortium. Starting from 1 October 2010, Trans Semarang is managed as part of the BLU UPTD Terminal Mangkang until 25 August 2016, where based on Law Number 23 of 2014 concerning Regional Government, Terminal Mangkang which is a type A terminal is under the authority of the Central Government, so that management Trans Semarang was carried out by the Semarang City BLU BRT, until 3 January 2017, with the determination of Semarang City BLU BRT to become Trans Semarang BLU UPTD with the issuance of Mayor Regulation number 116 of 2016 on 16 December 2016. In the history of its operation, there has been a change in operating hours (from 06.00 to from 21.00 WIB to 05.30 to 17.40 WIB), the tariff, and special student service hours are held, where the bus is specifically for students at the school level (both elementary, junior high, and high school). However, as of 14 July 2017, this facility was removed to optimize student-only BRT and BRT services.

=== Corridor ===
Corridor 1 was tested from 2 May 2009, to 4 May 2009, and fully operational on 18 September 2009 (after previously there was a delay from 20 May 2009, due to vehicle registration and consortium problems) with the Mangkang Terminal – Penggaron Terminal route. Using a fleet of 20 large buses, this bus underwent one revitalization in early 2017 with large buses assisted by the Ministry of Transportation for the 2016 budget (same fleet as Transjakarta and all large Trans fleets). This fleet is operated by PT Sembilan Sembilan Cahaya.

Corridor 2 was inaugurated on Monday 1 October 2012 by the Acting Mayor of Semarang, Hendrar Prihadi at the Semarang City Hall Courtyard, Jalan Pemuda. Corridor This bus uses medium-sized buses to serve passengers from Sisemut Terminal, Ungaran to Terboyo Terminal, Semarang. (Note: Terboyo passenger terminal is no longer used as passenger transportation as of 1 January 2018. Departure point what is written here is the Terboyo bus stop which is near the departure point of the fleet when the Terboyo passenger terminal is still operating and functioning initially i 1 April 2020. Previously the departure point started at the garage of each corridor (Padi Raya for corridor II and Banjardowo Market corridor VII)) This bus underwent fleet revitalization twice in early 2018 with the same buses as Corridor 6 and 2019 with new buses. This fleet is operated by PT Surya Setia Kusuma Semarang.

Corridor 4 was first inaugurated on 2 December 2013, with the Cangkiran Terminal route to the airport and rounding at Karangayu. At the beginning of the launch, this corridor used a large bus fleet. However, due to input from various parties, this corridor fleet was replaced with medium-sized buses. This corridor was also initially planned only to Ahmad Yani Airport (if there are no passengers who want to go to the airport or there are no reports of passengers at the airport stop, the fleet will only rotate in Karangayu). However, with various considerations, starting 1 August 2014 this corridor route was extended to Tawang Station. This fleet is operated by PT Matra Semar and has been revitalized, especially in 2020 with a new fleet.

Corridor 3 has been operating since 1 November 2014 and was inaugurated by the Mayor of Semarang, Hendrar Prihadi, on 5 November 2014, back from the original plan in October. Using medium-sized buses such as Corridor 2 and 4, this fleet is the second fleet to be provided with additional route indications in the form of exterior LEDs. This corridor serves the Tanjung Emas Port route to the Elizabeth end, which is divided into two (3A and 3B). The uniqueness of this corridor: upon arrival at the Elizabeth stop, the bus will continue its journey to the port, in contrast to other corridor services where after reaching the terminus point, bus a === Feeder Transit Stop === The Trans Semarang feeder transit stop is a stop specifically for passengers who want to move from the main corridor to the feeder corridor and vice versa. Passengers do not have to pay again if they want to move from the main corridor to the feeder corridor and vice versa. The table below is just a snapshot of some of the available feeder transit stops.

Name of the stop	Connected Corridor
Tugurejo Hospital	1 (direction Mangkang), F1A
Various Jaya	4 (direction Tawang), F1A
Muradi	1 (direction Penggaron), 4 (direction Tawang), F1A (direction Madukoro), F1B (direction Suratmo)
Court	1 (direction of Mangkang), 4 (direction of Cangkiran), F1A (direction of Ngaliyan), F1B (direction of Ngaliyan)
Muradi intersection	8, F1A
Knight High School	5, F1A, F1B
Palebon	7 (direction of Pemuda), F2A
ADA Majapahit	1, F2A, F2B
Sidodadi (Mataram)	3B, F2B
UPGRIS	3A, F2A
Kompol Maksum	3A, F2A
Raden Patah	2 (Ungaran direction), 3A, 3B, 4, F2B
Kini Jaya (Superindo Kedungmundu)	5, F2, F3
Bangetayu Park	7 (Pemuda direction), F2A, F2B
Gunungpati Terminal	8, F4A, F4B (terminus)
BNI Unnes	6, F4A, F4B
BSB City and BSB gas stations	4, F4A, F4B
Penggaron Terminal	1 (terminus), F3 (terminus)
Semarang State Polytechnic	6, F3
Banyumanik Terminal	2, F3

== Fleet specifications ==
- Corridor 1: Blue Hino RK8 R260 (J08E-UF) Bus (Body produced by Karoseri Laksana) 2016 Transportation Agency assistance
- Corridor 2: Mitsubishi FE 84 GBC Medium Bus red (Bodies produced by the Laksana and New Armada)
- Corridor 3: Isuzu NQR 71 4,700 cc red Medium Bus (Body produced by Gunung Mas Body) and several red Mitsubishi FE 84 GBC (Body produced by New Armada Body)
- Corridor 4: The red Mitsubishi FE 84 GBC Medium Bus (Body produced by the New Armada Body) and several Hino FB-130 (Body produced by the Restu Ibu Pusaka Body)
- Corridor 5: Isuzu NQR 71 Medium Bus 71 4,700 cc blue (Bodies produced by the Laksana Body and Tentrem Body) assistance from the Transportation Agency 2016 and 2019
- Corridor 6: Red Mitsubishi FE 84 GBC Medium Bus (Body produced by the New Armada Body) (one fleet of Isuzu NQR 71 4,700 cc blue produced by the Body of the Body for 2016 Transportation Agency assistance)
- Corridor 7: Medium Bus Isuzu NQR 71 4,700 cc blue and Hino FB 130 red (Body produced by Karoseri Laksana) (Dishub 2016 assistance)
- Corridor 8 : Medium Bus Isuzu NQR 71 4,700 cc red (Body produced by Gunung Mas Body)
- Airport Corridor: Isuzu NQR 71 Medium Bus 71 4,700 cc blue (Body produced by Tentrem Body) assistance from Dishub 2019

Each bus in all corridors is equipped with GPS, air conditioning, radio entertainment, as well as corridor and destination information boards (both electric and manual boards). Bus doors in corridors 1, 5, 7, and airports (as well as some fleets from corridors 2, 4, and 6) use a sliding door system on the left side (in corridor 1 fleets there are sliding doors on the right) while corridors 2, 3, 4, 6, and 8 use a folding door system (butterfly) on the left side, and have a sound indicating the door is open (only on some fleets). All settings are on the driver dashboard. For the feeder corridor microbuses use manual doors. All fleets use both diesel and Compressed Natural Gas (CNG / Gas Fuel) which can be changed en route.

== Operating hours ==
=== Early departure ===
- Monday – Saturday: 05.30 WIB
  - Special for Corridor 8 starting at 05.15 WIB
- National holidays (including Sunday): 05.45 WIB
- Another big day: customize

=== End of departure ===
- In general: 17.30 WIB
- Corridor 1
  - Penggaron Terminal : 17.50 WIB
  - Mangkang Terminal : 17.45 WIB
- Corridor 2
  - Terboyo: 18.05 WIB
  - Sisemut Terminal: 17.48 WIB
- Corridor 3 Ports
  - 3A: 17.32 WIB
  - 3B: 17.45 WIB
- Corridor 4
  - Cup Terminal: 17.40 WIB
  - Damri Tawang: 18.15 WIB
- Corridor 5
  - Meteseh : 17.40 WIB
  - PRPP : 17.50 WIB
- Corridor 6
  - Diponegoro National Hospital : 17.46 WIB
  - Semarang State University : 17.45 WIB
- Corridor 7 Terboyo : 17.50 WIB
- Corridor 8 Cangkiran Terminal : 17.45 WIB
- Feeder 1 Ngaliyan : 17.45 WIB
- Feeder 2 Terboyo : 17.45 WIB
- Feeders 3
  - Penggaron Terminal : 17.30 WIB
  - Banyumanik Terminal : 17.30 WIB
- Feeder 4 Gunungpati Terminal : 17.30 WIB

(Last fleet departure from the Pemuda City Hall stop: 18.30 WIB)

=== Special corridor ===
- Airport corridor at night on the Airport – Simpang Lima route (18.00–23.50 WIB), is currently not operating.

== Problems ==
=== Start of operation ===
The trial operation of the Trans Semarang has attracted attention due to the unpreparedness in the launch of the trial including the unpreparedness of supporting infrastructure (road markings, ticket vending machines, and installation of signs). After the inauguration of the trial, there were demonstrations from city transportation drivers because the routes had not been arranged so that there were concerns about city transportation operations. In addition, only 10 buses (out of 20) are operating due to operational costs and vehicle registration problems so that full operation is postponed from 20 May to 18 September 2009.

=== Accessibility for disabled people ===
Although the Trans Semarang fleet has been designed to accept people with disabilities, for the bus stops themselves, there are still those who only use stairs to go up to the bus stop, as well as the disabled side and the opposite side of the stairs. According to one student's observations at several points, people with disabilities complained that there was no road for wheelchairs so they had difficulty accessing them. Even though there are people with disabilities, they feel uncomfortable because the road is steep. The distance between the sidewalk floor and the bus stop is still quite high, and the distance between the bus stop and the bus still makes it difficult for people with disabilities.

=== Operational speed ===
The operational speed of Trans Semarang is limited to 60 km per hour in cross cities, and 30 km per hour in non-city routes. Even so, many Trans Semarang drivers drive Trans Semarang buses at speeds above operational limits and recklessly, so there's more than a few cases of accidents because of this.

=== Problems with operators ===
Since September 2021, Trans Semarang's Feeder 1 service has not been operated due to "technical problems". In this range, there are problems between operators, PT. Matra Semar, with BLU UPTD Trans Semarang ended with the termination of the contract on 30 September 2021. Information related to this emerged when PT Matra Semar filed a lawsuit to the Semarang District Court on 24 November 2021, after previously unsuccessful mediation efforts.

== Gallery ==
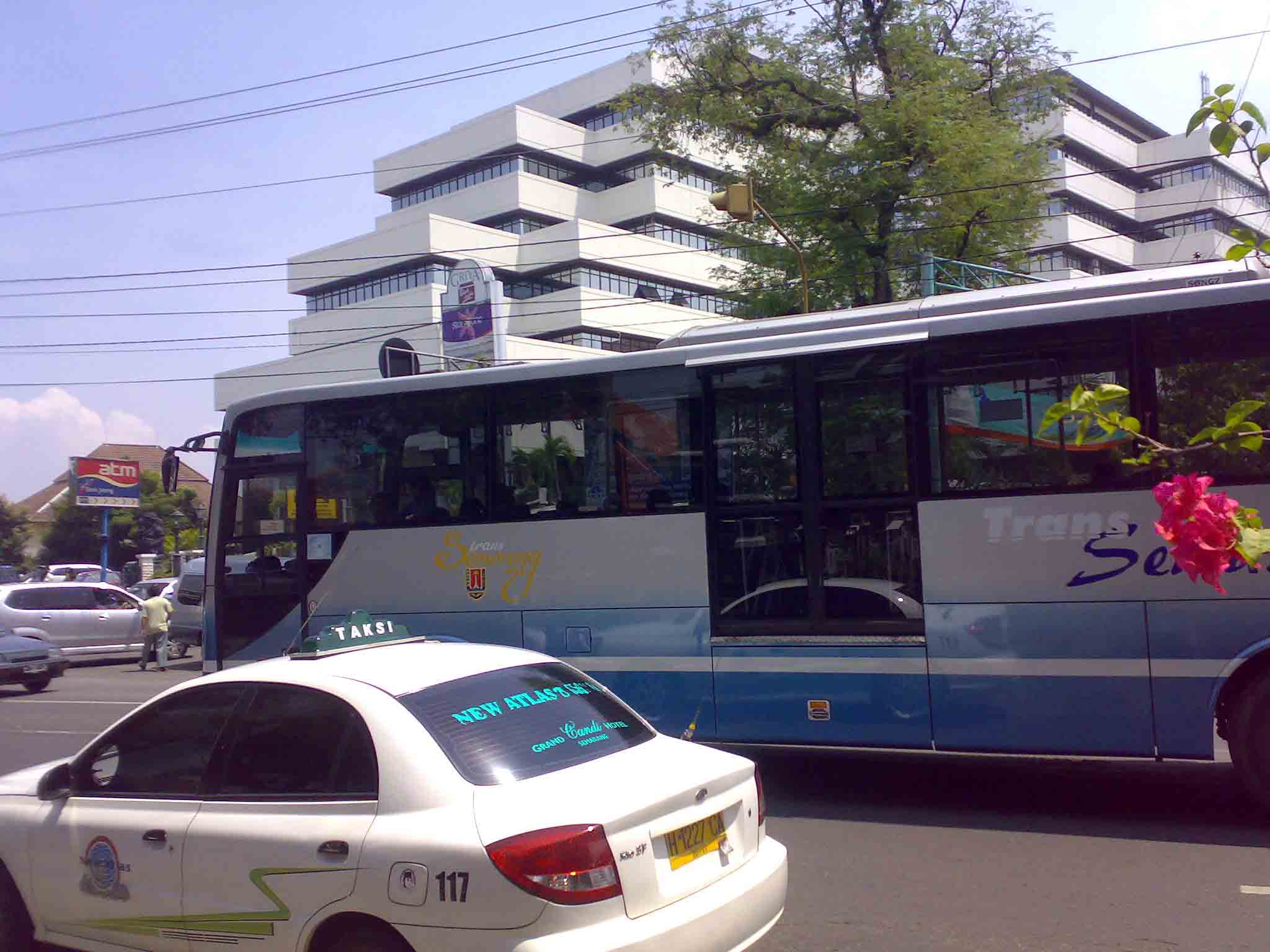
Corridor 1 fleet at the beginning of Trans Semarang operation

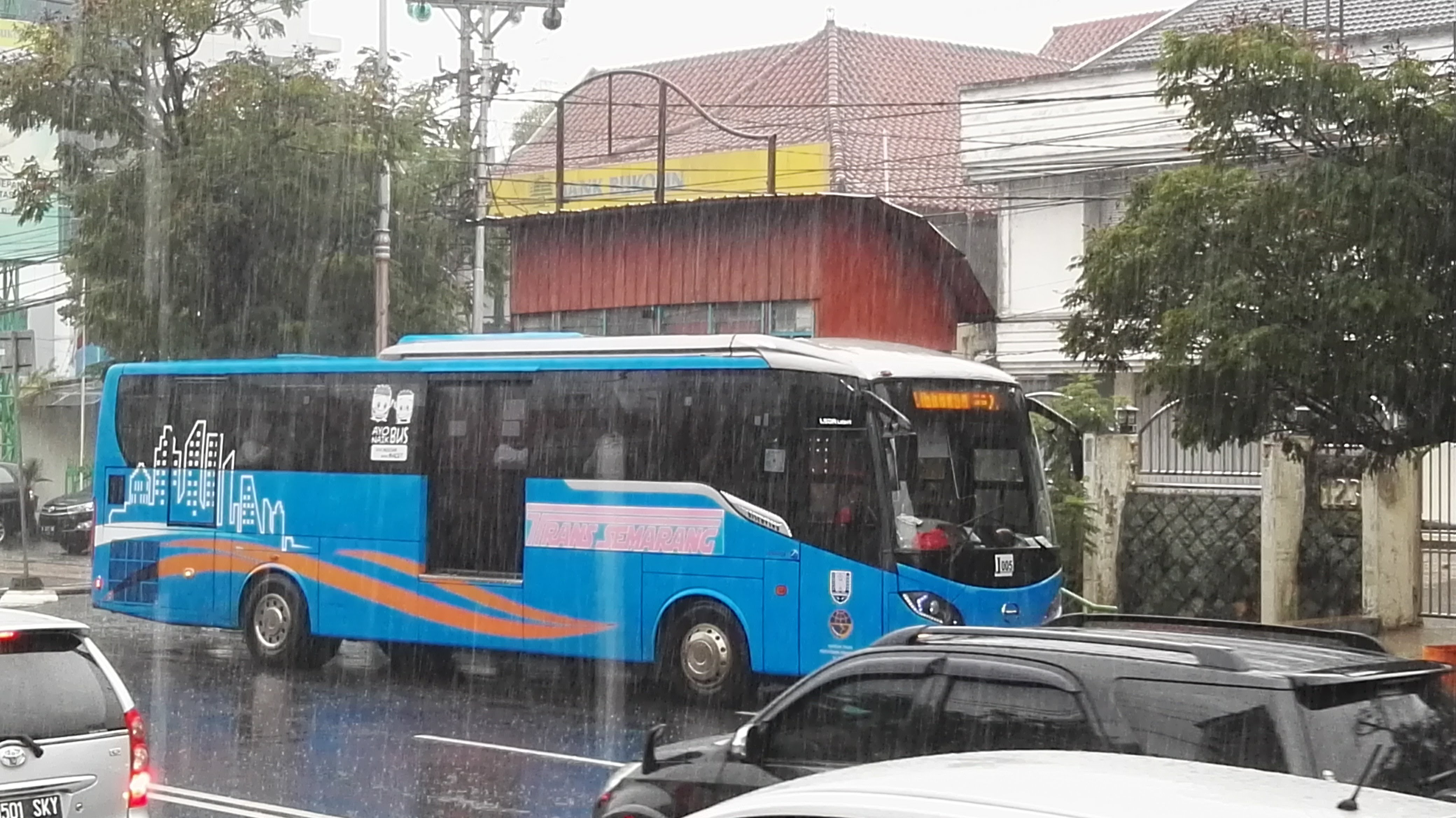
Fleet corridor 1 at the Gramedia bus stop

== See also ==
- BRT service in other cities
  - Trans Jogja
  - Transjakarta
  - Suroboyo Bus
  - Batik Solo Trans
  - Trans Sarbagita
