= Kedungsepur (train) =

Commuter rail system in Greater Semarang, Indonesia

Kedung Sepur
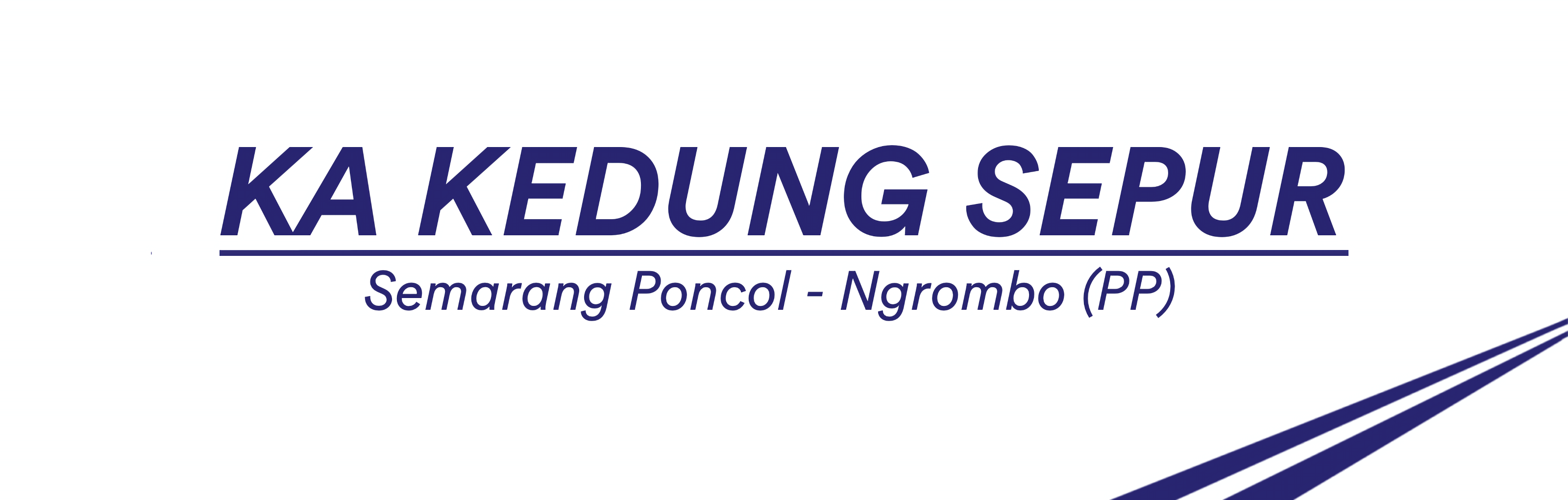

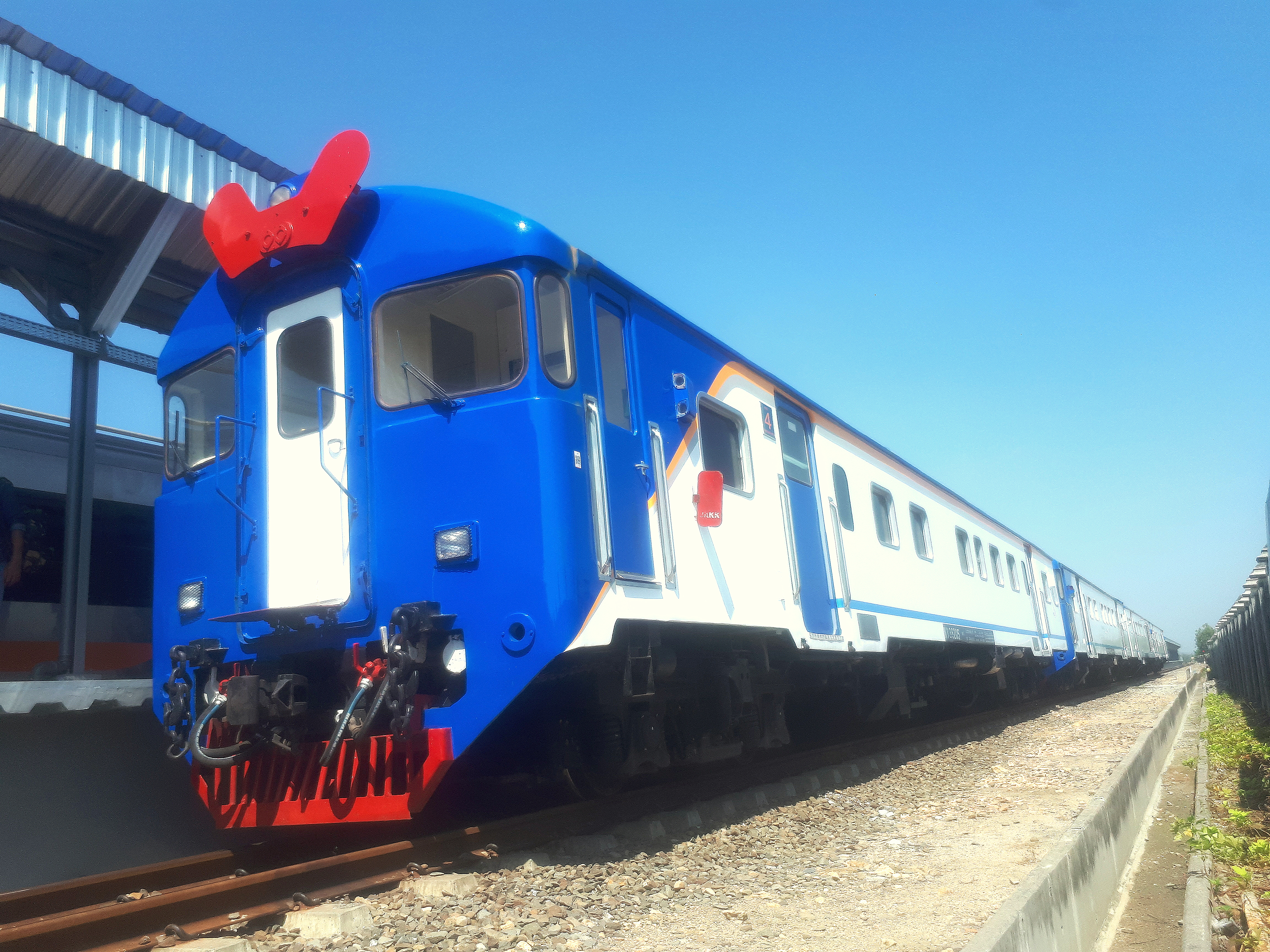
- Kedung Sepur in Ngrombo Station

Overview
- Status: Operating
- Owner: Directorate General of Railways, Ministry of Transportation
- Locale: Operational Area IV Semarang
- Termini: Semarang Poncol; Ngrombo
- Stations: 8

Service
- Type: Commuter rail
- Operator: Kereta Api Indonesia
- Rolling stock: MCW 302 Series DMU

History
- Opened: 28 September 2014

Technical
- Line length: 60 km (37 mi)
- Character: At-grade
- Track gauge: 1,067 mm (3 ft 6 in)

Kedung Sepur (or Kedungsepur) is a local train line in Central Java, Indonesia operated by Kereta Api Indonesia (KAI), serving Semarang Poncol Station (in Semarang)–Ngrombo Station (in Grobogan Regency) route and vice versa. The service name is taken from acronym of cities and regencies forming Semarang metropolitan area: Kendal, Demak, Ungaran, Salatiga, Semarang, and Purwodadi.

This train service operates using MCW 302 Series Diesel Multiple Unit (DMU) made by Nippon Sharyo which is planned for the operation of Kualanamu Airport Rail Link Services. However, this plan was canceled because Kualanamu Airport Rail Link Services was already operating using a new DMU made by Woojin from South Korea which arrived in North Sumatra at the same time.

== History ==
Kedung Sepur was first operated on 28 September 2014 coincide with the anniversary of KAI, serving Weleri Station to Gubug. Due to the lack of enthusiasts at the time, the service was moved to Semarang Poncol-Ngrombo route starting on 1 February 2015.
