= Karangkates railway tunnel =

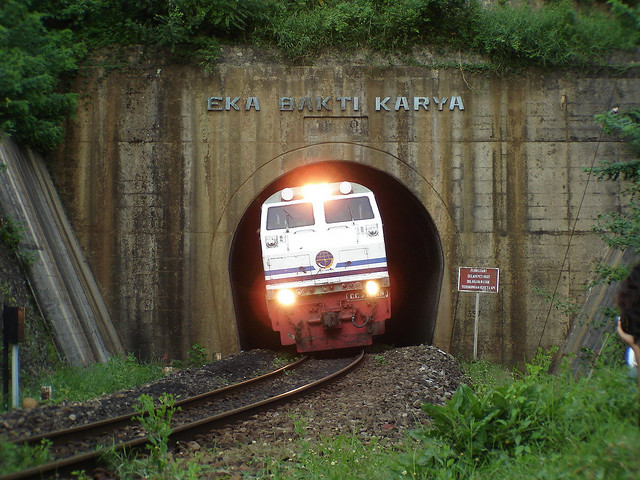
- Eka Bakti Karya railway tunnel in 2010
- Interactive map of Karangkates railway tunnel

Overview
- Location: Sumberpucung, Malang Regency, East Java
- Status: active
- Route: Wlingi - Malang
- Crosses: Kertosono-Bangil railway line
- Start: km 84+094
- End: km 84+835
- No. of stations: Pogajih

Operation
- Work began: 1965
- Constructed: 1965
- Opens: 1970
- Owner: Kereta Api Indonesia

Technical
- Length: 741 m (2,431 ft)
- Track gauge: 1067 mm

Karangkates railway tunnel is a railway tunnel that neared by the Karangkates Dam that build in 1965 and finished in 1970 by the Government of Indonesia at the same time the construction of the Karangkates Dam.

This railway tunnel has the number wisdom building 357. This railway tunnel is located between the Lahor railway bridge and the Dwi Bakti Karya railway tunnel (Karangkates II).

== History ==
On late 1961, work began on the Karangkates Dam for electricity generation, flood management, and irrigation purposes. The dam's reservoir area was planned to inundate the railway line between Sumber Pucung and Pogajih. Therefore, the government had to relocate the railway line to the north of the dam. This new line required two tunnels, one of which was the Karangkates railway tunnel I.

Construction of the new tunnel began in February 1965. However, due to cost constraints, the project was halted and only resumed in 1967. The relocation of the railway line and its two tunnels was inaugurated by the Minister of Public Works and Electricity and the Minister of Transportation on 1 April 1970.

== Service ==
Here's train that entering the Karangkates I and Karangkates II railway tunnel:

=== Passenger ===
==== Inter-city rail ====
Southern Java railway
Train name	Route
Executive
Gajayana	Gambir–Malang
Executive-Premium Economy
Malabar	Bandung–Malang
Executive-Economy
Malioboro Express	Purwokerto–Malang
Kertanegara	Purwokerto–Malang

Northern Java railway
Train name	Route
Executive
Brawijaya	Gambir–Semarang Tawang–Malang
Executive-Economy
Brantas	Pasar Senen–Semarang Tawang–Blitar
Jayabaya	Pasar Senen–Surabaya Pasarturi–Malang
Economy
Majapahit	Pasar Senen–Semarang Tawang–Malang
Matarmaja	Pasar Senen–Semarang Poncol–Malang

==== Local (Commuter Line) ====
Train name	Route
Dhoho Commuter Line	Surabaya Kota–Blitar via Kertosono
Dhoho Commuter Line	Blitar–Kertosono
Penataran Commuter Line	Surabaya Kota–Blitar via Malang
Tumapel Commuter Line	Surabaya Kota–Malang

=== Freight ===
Train name	Route	
Overnight train service Parcel Middle Parcel	Kampung Bandan	Malang

== Incident ==
A landslide and flooding occurred in front of the Karangkates I railway tunnel on 18 October 2022. During the normalization process, several trains such as the Matarmaja (281) and Gajayana (71) detoured via the Malang–Sidoarjo–Mojokerto–Kertosono Line. On 20 October 2022 at 11.00 WIB, the line was passable by trains but with a speed limited to 40 km/h (24 mph).

== See also ==
- Kertosono–Bangil railway
