= Karangkates II railway tunnel =

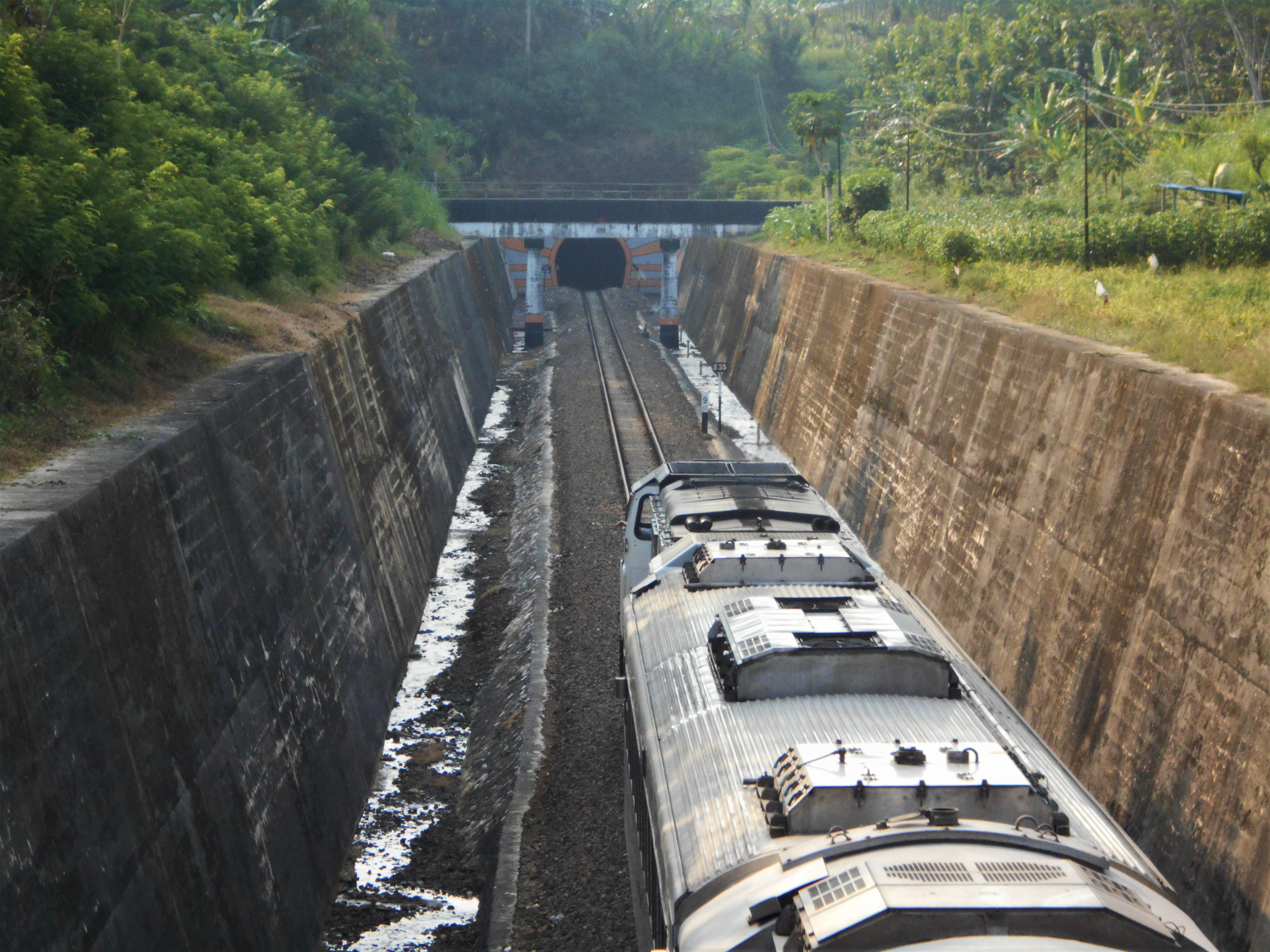
- Gajayana will entering the Karangkates II railway tunnel, 2021
- Interactive map of Karangkates II railway tunnel

Overview
- Location: Sumberpucung, Malang Regency, East Java
- Status: active
- Route: Wlingi - Malang
- Crosses: Kertosono-Bangil railway line
- Start: km 83+087
- End: km 83+527
- No. of stations: Sumber Pucung

Operation
- Work began: 1965
- Constructed: 1965
- Opens: 1970
- Owner: Kereta Api Indonesia

Technical
- Length: 440 m (1,440 ft)
- Track gauge: 1067 mm

Karangkates II railway tunnel is a railway tunnel that build in 1965 and finished in 1970 with a Karangkates railway tunnel by the Government of Indonesia at the same time the construction of the Karangkates Dam.

This tunnel is 440 meters long and is managed by Operations Region VIII Surabaya part of Malang Regency.

The railway tunnel has the number wisdom building 352. If a person go east, this railway tunnel is located after Karangkates I railway tunnel.

== History ==
In late 1961, work began on the Karangkates Dam for electricity generation, flood management, and irrigation purposes. The dam's reservoir area was planned to inundate the railway line between Sumberpucung and Pogajih. Therefore, the government had to relocate the railway line to the north of the dam. This new line required two railway tunnels, one of which was the Karangkates II railway tunnel.

Tunnel construction began in February 1965, starting with the Karangkates I railway tunnel. However, due to cost constraints, the project was halted and only resumed in 1967. The relocation of the railway line and its two tunnels was inaugurated by the Minister of Public Works and Electricity and the Minister of Transportation on 1 April 1970.

== Service ==
Trains that use the Karangkates I and Karangkates II railway tunnel:

=== Passenger ===
==== Inter-city rail ====
Southern Java railway
Train name	Route
Executive
Gajayana	Gambir–Malang
Executive-Premium Economy
Malabar	Bandung–Malang
Executive-Economy
Malioboro Express	Purwokerto–Malang
Kertanegara	Purwokerto–Malang

Northern Java railway
Train name	Route
Executive
Brawijaya	Gambir–Semarang Tawang–Malang
Executive-Economy
Brantas	Pasar Senen–Semarang Tawang–Blitar
Jayabaya	Pasar Senen–Surabaya Pasarturi–Malang
Economy
Majapahit	Pasar Senen–Semarang Tawang–Malang
Matarmaja	Pasar Senen–Semarang Poncol–Malang

==== Local (Commuter Line) ====
Train name	Route
Dhoho Commuter Line	Surabaya Kota–Blitar via Kertosono
Dhoho Commuter Line	Blitar–Kertosono
Penataran Commuter Line	Surabaya Kota–Blitar via Malang
Tumapel Commuter Line	Surabaya Kota–Malang

=== Freight ===
Train name	Route	
Overnight train service Parcel Middle Parcel	Kampung Bandan	Malang

== See also ==
- Kertosono–Bangil railway
