= Kertosono–Bangil railway =

Railway line that connects Kertosono to Bangil

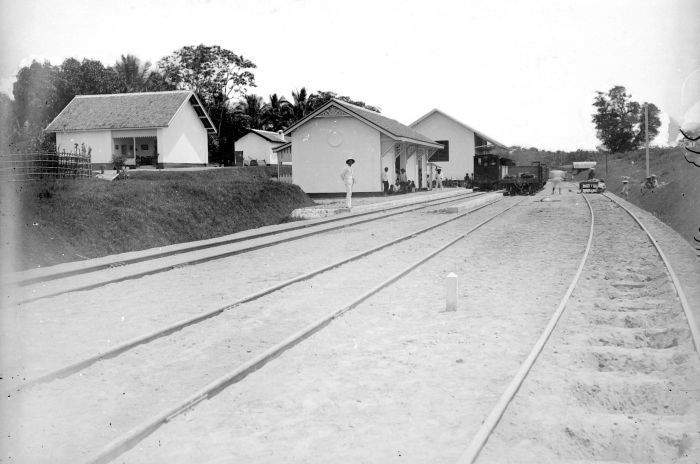
- Station at Kepandjen (Java) where the railway is being constructed.

Overview
- Native name: Jalur kereta api Kertosono–Bangil
- Status: Operational
- Owner: Directorate General of Railways (DJKA)
- Locale: Kertosono - Bangil, East Java
- Termini: Kertosono; Bangil
- Stations: 32

Service
- Type: Inter-city rail and Commuter rail
- Operator: PT Kereta Api Indonesia

History
- Opened: 1878-1896

Technical
- Number of tracks: 1
- Track gauge: 1,067 mm (3 ft 6 in)
- Electrification: Not available

Kertosono–Bangil railway is a railway line that connects Kertosono to Bangil via Malang, East Java. This line is part of Surabaya Operational Area VIII in the Bangil–Wlingi segment and Madiun Operational Area VII in the Talun–Kertosono segment, which are separate from the main line. KAI Commuter manages all train stations serving the Dhoho and Penataran Commuter Line. This railway line is a branch line from the ‘southern line’ of Java in the Kertosono–Malang segment.

This route is collectively part of the East Java pocket route. On this line, there are two domestically constructed tunnels named Karangkates I and II, built adjacent to the Sutami Reservoir in 1967–1969, specifically on the section of track between Sumberpucung and Pogajih. In addition, there is also the Lahor railway bridge, which is the longest bridge on the line. This line was built by the Surabaya Class I Railway Engineering Office under the Directorate General of Railways. All of these railroad tracks are single and use Siemens & Halske AG semi-automatic mechanical signaling, except for the two ends of the line, which use electric signals, and Purwoasri, which uses an electromechanical block system.

== History ==
=== Planning (1869-1888) ===
On 24 March 1869, Dutch Colonial Minister, de Waal consulted with the Head of Exploitation of the Dutch Staatsspoorwegen, J.A. Kool and a professor from the Delft Polytechnic School, N.H. Henket regarding the track width required for the rail network in the Dutch East Indies. On 20 September 1869, a general railway plan was drawn up containing recommended track widths, preliminary designs for four lines, and important lines to be built, both by the government and private parties of the Dutch Indies. The Kertosono–Blitar line via Kediri and the Gempol–Blitar line via Malang were included in the list of important railway lines recommended for construction.

A Dutch engineer named David Maarschalk had designed a railway line from Sidoarjo Station to Solo, along with a branch from Kertosono to Blitar via Kediri. The plan was then sent through the government to the ministry. The proposal was then discussed on 14 May 1878, and its approval was promulgated in Staatsblad Number 93, published on 6 July 1878.} Maarschalk retired on 15 November 1880, before the first segment of the Kertosono–Blitar line was completed, and was replaced by H.G. Derx.

=== Bangil–Malang segment Construction (1878-1879) ===
The Bangil–Malang railway line was the first segment of this railway line. This segment was part of the new railway line construction program Surabaya–Pasuruan–Malang. The construction of this segment was led by Maarschalk with "reasonable work duration and no cost overruns." The Bangil–Sengon segment was completed on 1 November 1878, less than six months after the completion of the Surabaya–Pasuruan segment. The Sengon–Lawang segment followed, becoming operational on 1 May 1879. The last segment to be operated was Lawang–Malang, on 20 July 1879.

=== Kertosono–Blitar segment Construction (1881–1884) ===
The construction of the Kertosono–Blitar Station line is divided into three segments:

1. Kertosono–Kediri Segment
2. Kediri–Tulungagung Segment
3. Tulungagung–Blitar Segment

Each segment was constructed in a relatively short time. Construction of the first segment, Kertosono–Kediri, was completed on 13 August 1881.

The opening of the Kertosono–Kediri segment was celebrated with great fanfare. The first train to Kediri, "witnessed by spectators packed onto the station platform," departed from Surabaya for Kertosono. The train received an additional carriage at Kertosono, to the point that the steam locomotive had difficulty pulling the train.

The train then passed Purwoasri, Papar, Minggiran, and Susuhan, which were still unpainted, unattended, and had no telegraph poles installed. This was because SS management wanted to open the line as quickly as possible. The train arrived at Kediri Station and was greeted with gamelan, cheers from residents, and greetings from local officials.

The Kediri–Tulungagung segment was completed and inaugurated on 2 June 1883. Like the inauguration of the previous segment, this segment was inaugurated with considerable fanfare. Artillery and rifle fire greeted the arrival of the first train to pass through the line in Kediri. A train set, consisting of 30 cars pulled by 2 locomotives, was used to transport 2,000 passengers, both invited and local residents, for the first train journey to Tulungagung. Upon arrival in Tulungagung, passengers were treated to chilled champagne, a tiger robbery celebration with five tigers, and a musical performance with bands from Pasuruan and Malang. The new line was opened to the public the next day, on 3 June 1883.

The last segment, is the Tulungagung–Blitar were completed on 16 June 1884.

=== Malang–Blitar segment Construction (1896–1897) ===
In 1893, the government ordered the construction of a railway line to connect Malang and Blitar. The Malang–Kepanjen Station segment was completed on 5 January 1896, followed by the Blitar–Wlingi Station segment five days later on 10 January 1896. The line between Blitar and Malang was officially connected on 30 January 1897, with the completion of the Wlingi–Kepanjen segment.

=== Indonesia's Post-independence developments ===
In late 1961, work was carried out on the Karangkates Dam for power generation, flood control, and irrigation purposes. The reservoir area of the dam was planned to inundate the railway line between Sumberpucung, Sumberpucung, Pogajih. Therefore, the government had to relocate the railway line to the north of the dam. This new line required two railway tunnels.

Construction of the new tunnel began in February 1965. However, due to cost constraints, the project was halted and only continued in 1967. The relocation of the railway line and its two tunnels was inaugurated by the Minister of Public Works and Electricity and the Minister of Transportation on 1 April 1970 with the names Eka Bakti Karya and Dwi Bakti Karya Tunnels. The names of the two tunnels were then changed to Karangkates I and Karangkates II.

== Service ==
Here's train that passing the Kertosono-Bangil railway line:

=== Passenger ===
==== Inter-city rail ====
Southern Java railway
Train name	Route
Executive
Gajayana	Gambir–Malang
Executive-Premium Economy
Malabar	Bandung–Malang
Executive-Economy
Malioboro Express	Purwokerto–Malang
Kertanegara	Purwokerto–Malang
Singasari	Pasar Senen–Blitar
Economy
Kahuripan	Kiaracondong–Blitar

Eastern Java railway
Train name	Route
Executive-Economy
Ijen Express	Malang–Banyuwangi
Economy
Tawang Alun	Malang Kotalama–Banyuwangi

Northern Java railway
Train name	Route
Executive
Brawijaya	Gambir–Semarang Tawang–Malang
Executive-Economy
Brantas	Pasar Senen–Semarang Tawang–Blitar
Jayabaya	Pasar Senen–Surabaya Pasarturi–Malang
Economy
Majapahit	Pasar Senen–Semarang Tawang–Malang
Matarmaja	Pasar Senen–Semarang Poncol–Malang

==== Agglomeration ====
Train Name	Route
Executive
Arjuno Express	Surabaya Gubeng–Malang

==== Local (Commuter Line) ====
Train name	Route
Dhoho Commuter Line	Surabaya Kota–Blitar via Kertosono
Dhoho Commuter Line	Blitar–Kertosono
Penataran Commuter Line	Surabaya Kota–Blitar via Malang
Tumapel Commuter Line	Surabaya Kota–Malang

=== Freight ===
Train name	Route	
Middle Java railway
Overnight train service Parcel Middle Parcel	Kampung Bandan	Malang
Eastern Java railway
BBM Pertamina Cargo	Benteng	Malang Kotalama

== See also ==
- Solo Balapan–Kertosono–Surabaya Gubeng railway
