= Solo Jebres railway station =

Railway station in Indonesia

Y12 Solo Jebres Station Stasiun Solo Jebres
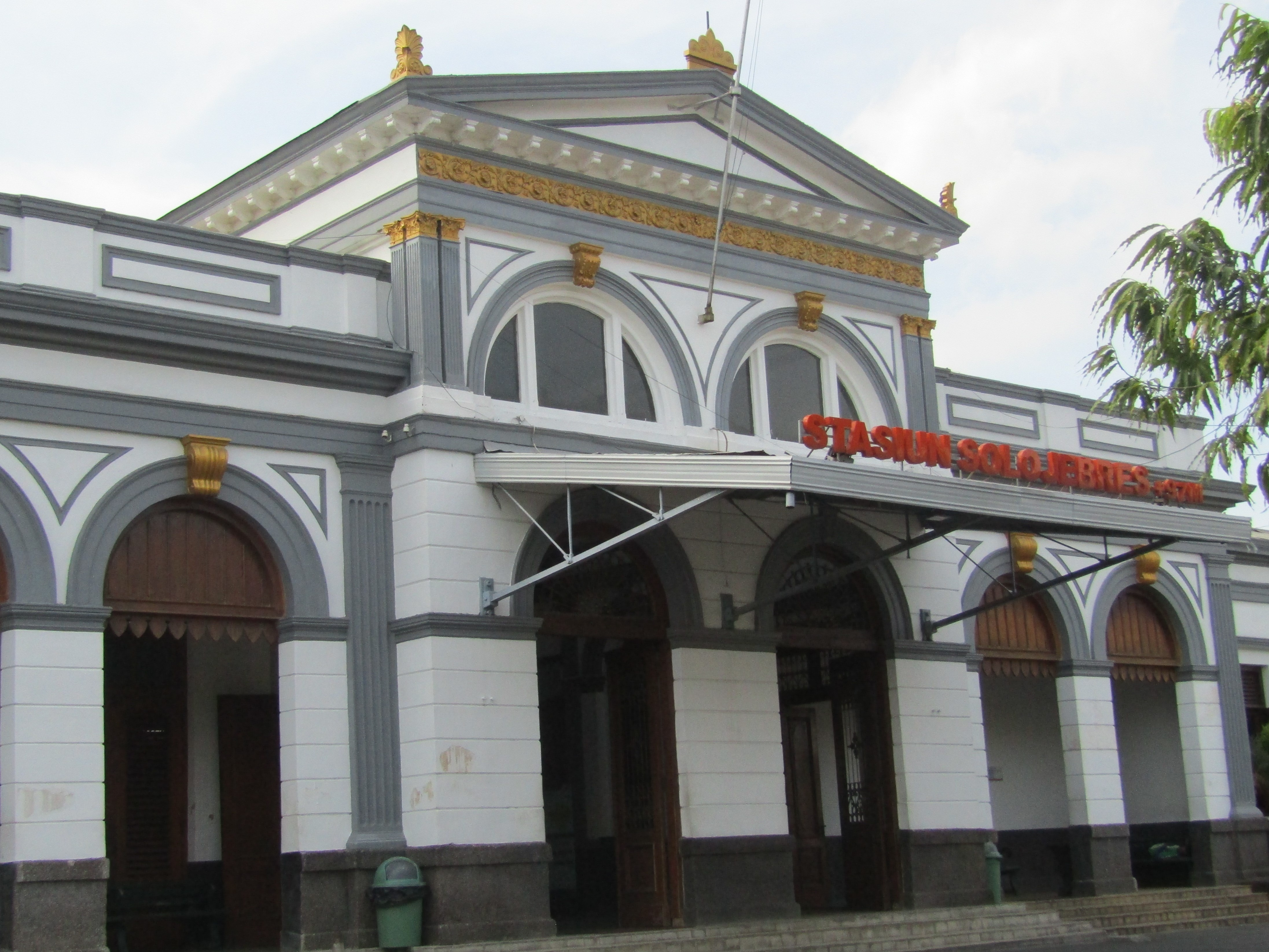
- Solo Jebres Station main building in 2019

General information
- Other names: Jebres Station
- Location: Jalan Ledoksari Utara No. 1, Purwodiningratan, Jebres, Surakarta; Central Java; Indonesia
- Coordinates: 7°33′43″S 110°50′21″E
- Elevation: +97 m (318 ft)
- Owner: Kereta Api Indonesia
- Operator: Kereta Api Indonesia; KAI Commuter
- Lines: Yogyakarta Line; Solo Balapan–Kertosono
- Platforms: 3
- Tracks: 7
- Connections: Batik Solo Trans: 1 3

Construction
- Structure type: Ground
- Parking: Available

Other information
- Station code: SK • 3151
- Classification: Large type C

History
- Opened: 24 May 1884
- Former names: Djebres Solo station, Solo Kasunanan station

Services
Preceding station		Following station
Solo Balapan towards Yogyakarta	Yogyakarta Line	Palur Terminus
Location
- Location within Java

Solo Jebres Station, (Note: KAI still maintains the procedure for the station's name writing, according to the Buku Jarak (Distance Book) dan Daftar Waktu (The Timetable) books, as Solojebres, which is also used as a medium of inter-station communications. However, because the subdistrict where the station is located is only named Jebres, the station's name follows the other two stations in Surakarta (Solo Balapan or Solo Kota). The station code "SK" probably comes from Solo Kasunanan, a name proposed during the construction process. In a book titled Officieele reisgids der spoor- en tramwegen en aansluitende automobieldiensten op Java en Madoera (1926), the station's name is written as Solo Djebres. See: Staatsspoorwegen (1926). Officieele reisgids der spoor- en tramwegen en aansluitende automobieldiensten op Java en Madoera (1926). Surakarta: N.V. Sie Dian Ho. p. 12 and 146.) also known as Jebres Station, is a type-C large class railway station in Surakarta, Central Java, Indonesia. The station, which is located 97 metres (318 ft) above sea level, is operated by Operational Area VI Yogyakarta of Kereta Api Indonesia (KAI). It is one of the major railway stations in the city.

Before Purwosari Station was used as a stop and terminus for economy- and mixed-class intercity trains in Surakarta, all such types of trains crossing the northern and southern Java lines stopped at this station. Since 1 February 2014 trains are no longer start and end their journey at the station. All train journeys are diverted to Purwosari and Solo Balapan stations as the terminus and the train stops in Surakarta are on the southern Java line, while Solo Jebres Station is used as a stop for passenger trains that pass through central Java line, the Gundih-Solo Balapan line or vice versa.

== History ==
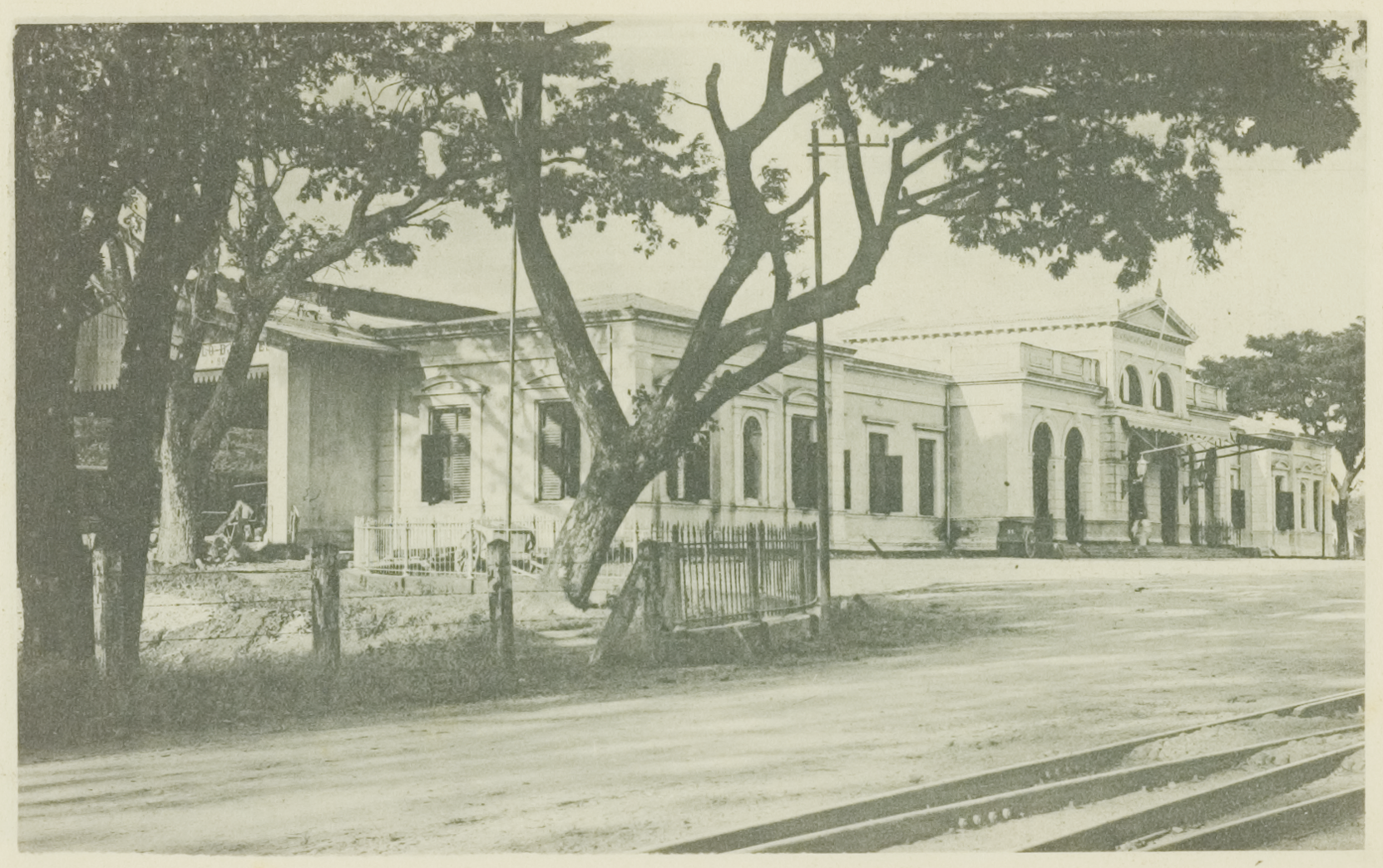
Solo Jebres Station circa 1930s, with a Solosche Tramweg Maatschappij (SoTM) tramway at the foreground

In contrast to other stations located on the Staatsspoorwegen (SS) line, Solo Jebres station was built on the former Nederlandsch-Indische Spoorweg Maatschappij (NIS) line, running in conjunction with the Samarang–Vorstenlanden railway line. There are not much sources discussing any line that ends on the banks of the Solo River — only the 1869 map that shows its existence, but it was never discussed. The line crosses the territory of Surakarta Sunanate.

In 1882–1884, the SS carried out the development of the line, although the line was constructed from Surabaya to Madiun, until it ended at Solo Balapan. On 24 May 1884, the former NIS line was replaced with a new SS line, and Solo Jebres Station was opened.

Currently there are some improvement in the station as a part of KAI Commuter Yogyakarta Line eastward extension to Palur in neighboring Karanganyar Regency.

== Architecture ==
This station building has a uniqueness that cannot be found in other SS stations. The front view of the station used to be addressed to the Keraton Kasunanan Surakarta. Broadly speaking, the station has an Indische Empire style, similar to other SS stations built in the 1880–90s, but the facade of the main station building is rich in detail influenced by the Neoclassical style. The art nouveau impression is emphasized on many elements, such as jalousies, ornaments, and trellis in the semicircular ventilation at the departure gate. Cornice-shaped moldings are found on the doors besides the departure door which gives the building a majestic impression.

This symmetrical station building has a spatial pattern that is arranged linearly from east to west. The station entrance is right in the middle of the building facing Jalan Ledoksari with a roof that is higher than the left or right wings of the building. The rooms inside each station are rectangular in shape which are arranged linearly so that the horizontal character of this station gets stronger.

This pristine station building is now designated as a cultural heritage by the Surakarta City Government based on the Decree of the Mayor of Surakarta No. 646/1-2/1/2013 and Decree of the Minister of Culture and Tourism No. PM. 57/PW.007/MKP/2010.

== Station layout ==
Initially, Solo Jebres Station had seven train lines with line 2 being a straight line. After the double-track to Palur Station was operated on 20 August 2019, then to Solo Balapan on 7 October 2020, line 2 was only used as a straight line towards Madiun, while line 3 was used as a straight track towards Solo Balapan–Yogyakarta and Semarang. During the construction of the double track, a canopy was added and there was an extension or elevation of the platform between lines 1 and 2. The signaling system has now been replaced with an electric signaling system.

On the north side of this station there is a container terminal which is no longer active. Previously, container loading and unloading services were served on lines 6 and 7. KAI had discussed reactivating the terminal, but this never materialized.

After the completion of the Yogyakarta–Solo KRL service extension project eastward to Palur Station on 17 August 2022, this station has an EMU depot and electricity substation to support overhead line. The line layout at this station was slightly changed and the number of lines was increased to eight. Line 5 is now equipped with exit signals at both ends, while lines 7 and 8 are used as access points to the KRL depot. In addition, the old low island platform between lanes 2 and 3 has been dismantled and replaced with a new high island platform between lanes 3 and 4.

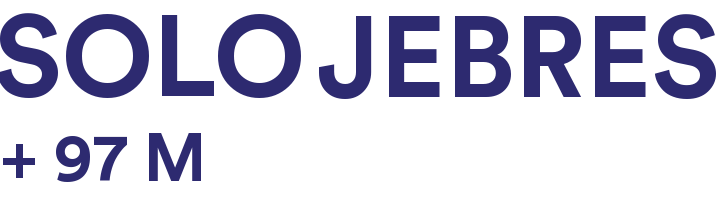
Y12
P
Platform floor
Line 8
EMU depot
Line 7
Line 6
Line 5
Train parking
Line 4
Freight/inter-city train stop
Island platform, the doors are opened on the right side or on the left side
Line 3
← (Solo Balapan) Yogyakarta Line to Yogyakarta

Straight tracks to Solo Balapan

Line 2
Yogyakarta Line to Palur (Palur) →

Straight tracks to Madiun

Island platform, the doors are opened on the right side or on the left side
Line 1
Inter-city train stop
Side platform, the doors are opened on the left side (from the east) or on the right side (from the west)
G
Main building

== Services ==
The following is a list of passenger train services at the Solo Jebres Station.

=== Intercity trains ===
Executive class

- Brawijaya, to Jakarta–Gambir and to Malang via Semarang Tawang and Madiun

Economy class

- Matarmaja, to Jakarta–Pasar Senen and to Malang via Semarang Tawang and Madiun

Mixed class

- Brantas, to Jakarta–Pasar Senen and to Blitar via Semarang Tawang and Madiun (executive-economy)

=== Commuter rail ===
- Yogyakarta Line, to Yogyakarta and to Palur

== Supporting transportation ==
The Jebres bus stops of Batik Solo Trans is located near the station, serving Corridors 1 and 3.

Type	Route	Destination	Notes
Batik Solo Trans	1	Adisumarmo International Airport–Palur	Get off at Jebres bus stop at Urip Soemohardjo street and walk to station
Batik Solo Trans	3	Kartasura–Thiongting	Get off at Jebres bus stop at Urip Soemohardjo street and walk to station

== Gallery ==
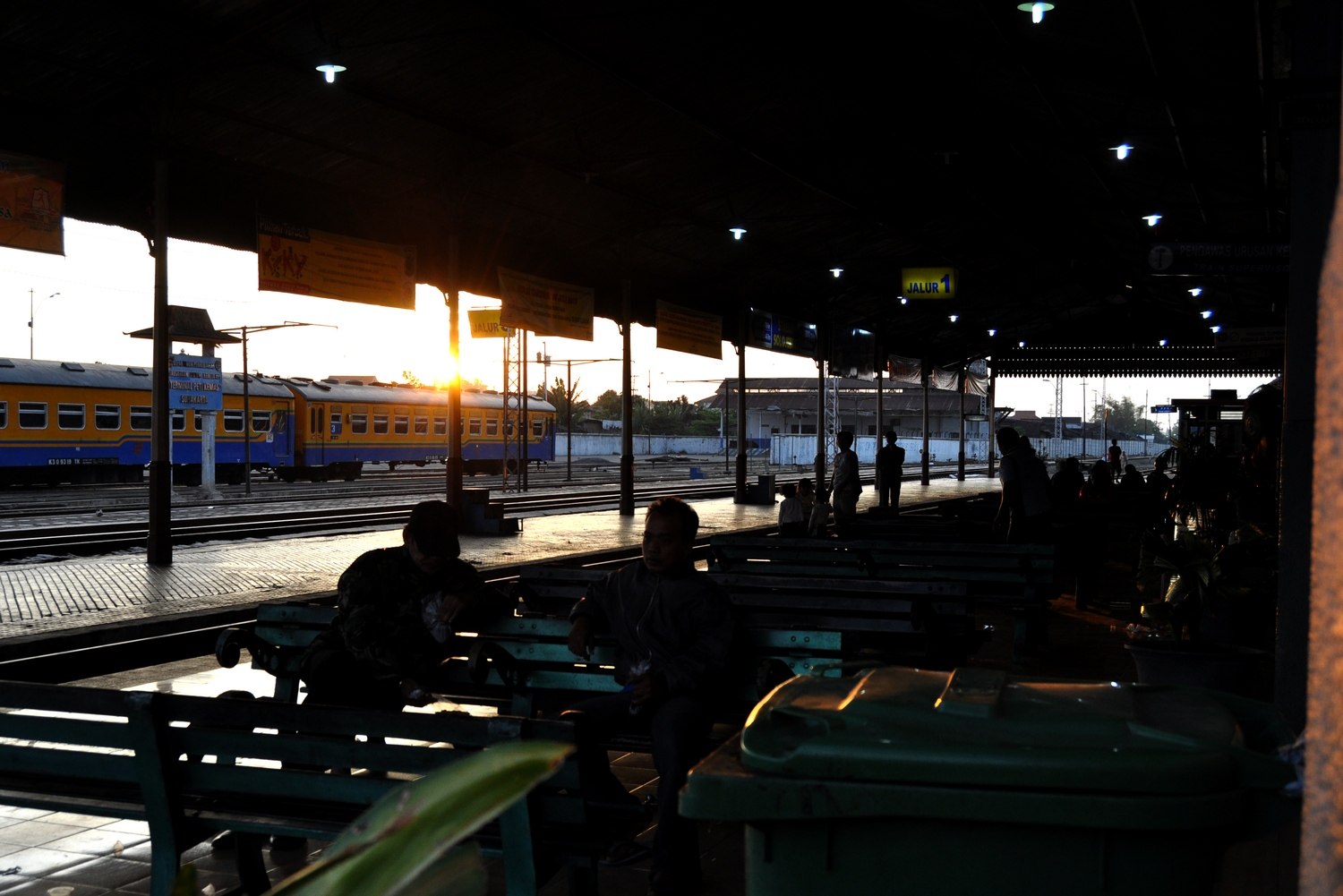
The station platform in the morning

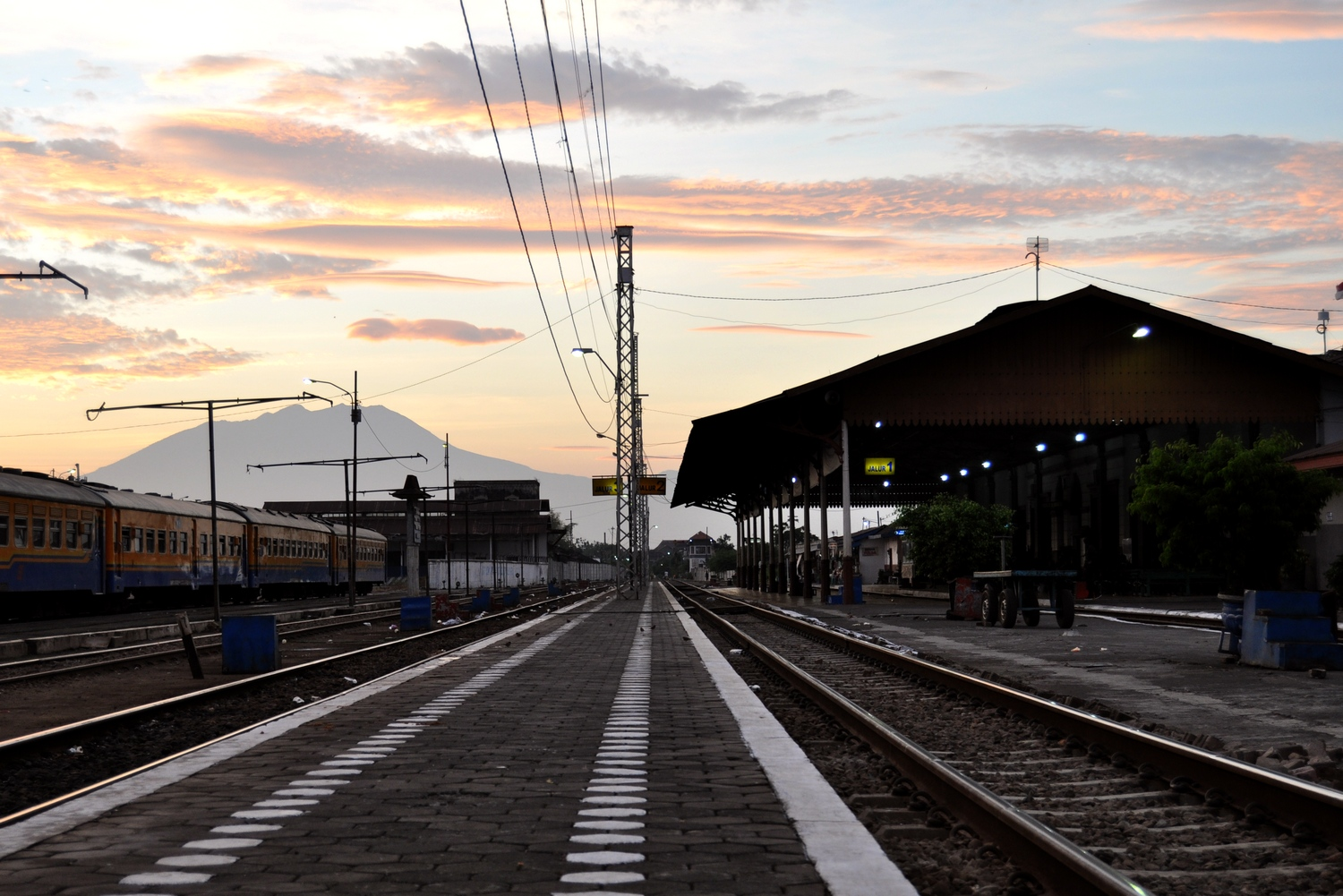
The station yard in the morning with Mount Lawu seen from afar (left)

== See also ==
Other railway stations in Surakarta:

- Purwosari railway station
- Solo Balapan railway station
- Solo Kota railway station

== Footnotes ==
Preceding station	Kereta Api Indonesia	Following station
Solo Balapan; Terminus	Solo Balapan–Kertosono	Palur towards Kertosono
