= Arjuno Express =

Passenger train service between Surabaya and Malang via Sidoarjo, Indonesia

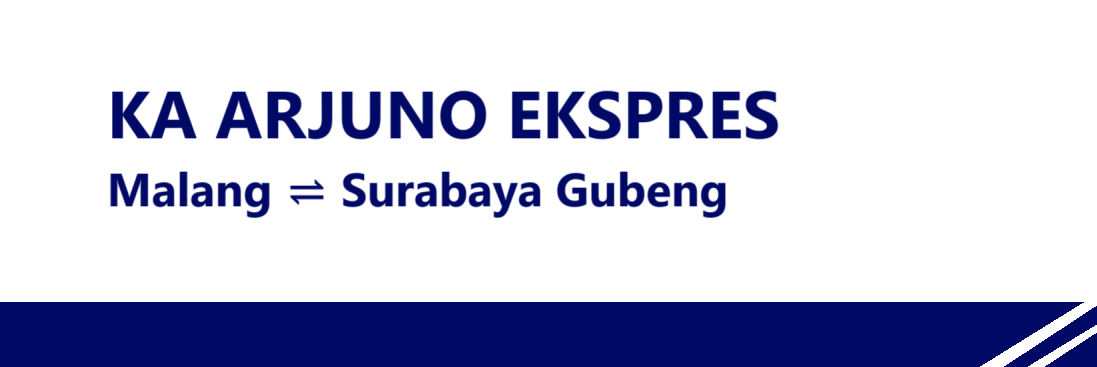

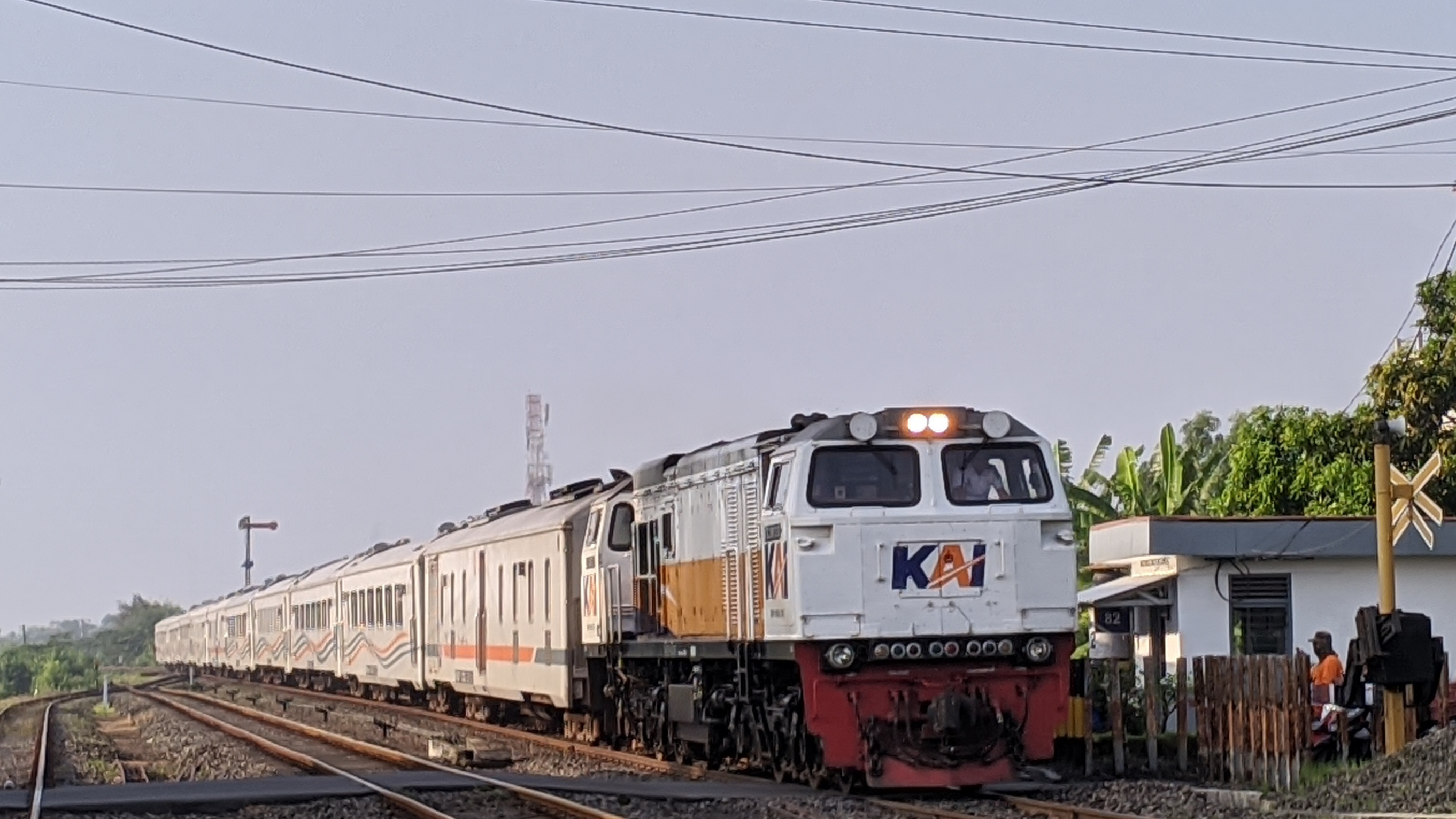
- Arjuna Express heading to Surabaya Gubeng, 2024

Overview
- Service type: Commuter rail
- Status: Operational (facultative)
- First service: 19 March 2021
- Current operator: Kereta Api Indonesia

Route
- Termini: Surabaya Gubeng; Malang
- Distance travelled: 93 km (57 mil)
- Average journey time: 1 hours 55 minutes
- Service frequency: Daily each way (morning schedule only)
- Train number: 65F - 66F

On-board services
- Class: executive
- Seating arrangements: 50 seats arranged 2–2 (executive) seats can recline and rotate
- Catering facilities: snack, food, and drink

Technical
- Rolling stock: CC206/CC203/CC201
- Track gauge: 1067 mm
- Operating speed: 70 km/h (43 mph) to 120 km/h (75 mph)
Route map
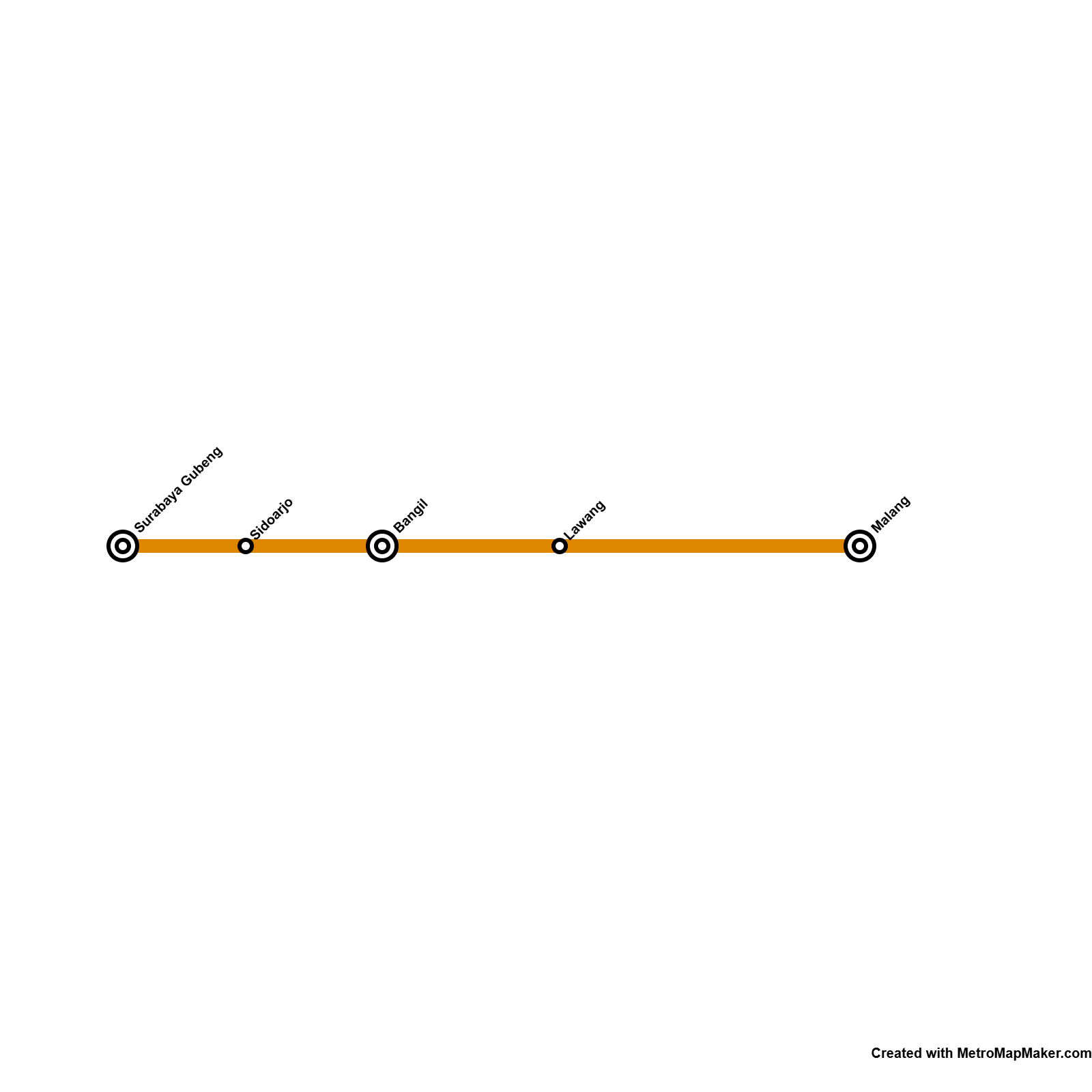

Arjuno Express is a commuter line only an executive that connecting between Surabaya Gubeng and Malang via Sidoarjo and Bangil.

This train uses the "idle" Brawijaya trains which are currently on duty.

== Branding ==
The name Arjuno itself comes from an inactive cone volcano named Mount Arjuno which is located on the border of Batu City, Malang Regency, Pasuruan Regency and is under the management of Raden Soerjo Grand Forest Park. In addition, the name Arjuno comes from one of the characters in the Mahabharata puppet show, Arjuna.

== Operating ==
This train was first operated on 19-22 March 2021 as an optional train, which means it only operates on certain days (Friday to Monday).The journey from Surabaya to Malang and vice versa with a distance of around 93 kilometers (57 miles) takes around 2 hours and only stops at Waru (towards Malang), Sidoarjo, Bangil, and Lawang.

== History ==
Before the operation of the Arjuno Express, there were several executive train services Surabaya - Malang. Some of these services were the Jatayu train (using idle Turangga) which operated between 1996 and 2000, as well as the extension of the Bima to Malang between 2014 and 2020. The Jatayu train itself was removed due to low occupancy, while the Bima train was returned to its original route due to the COVID-19 pandemic.

In addition, there used to be an Arjuna Express that served the Surabaya-Madiun route. This train operated using a fleet of KRDI made by PT INKA, but wasn't equipped with air conditioning. Due to having a low passenger occupancy rate of below 50% and frequent technical problems, the Arjuna Express finally stopped operating around 2016.

The Arjuno Express uses eight executive cars with a total capacity of 400 passengers. When Gapeka 2021 was in effect, there were 2 types of train sets used by the Arjuno Express, namely mild steel and stainless steel. For morning departures (from Surabaya) and afternoon (from Malang), the Arjuno Express used stainless steel trains belonging to the Turangga train (Bandung-Surabaya Gubeng) which was resting. Meanwhile, for morning departures (from Malang) and afternoon departures (from Surabaya), the Arjuno Ekspres train used light steel trains belonging to the Brawijaya train (Gambir-Malang) which had just arrived in Malang, then immediately used for the Arjuno Express.

Began on 1 June 2023 following the enactment of new train travel chart 2023, the Arjuno Express there is only one facultative return trip available using the Brawijaya train circuit using the mild steel train. The Arjuno Express train trip with the stainless steel train or the Turangga train was removed because the Turangga train itself swapped trains with the Argo Wilis which now applies a "three train and four trip" operating system.

As of 3 May 2024, Brawijaya train use the 2016 & 2017 New Image series of automated Arjuno Express which also use the New Image series of Brawijaya train idle trains.

== Station ==
Here's Arjuno Express route based on the enactment of new train travel chart 2025:

- Surabaya Gubeng (start/end)
- Sidoarjo
- Bangil
- Lawang
- Malang (start/end)
