= Majapahit (train) =

Train in Indonesia

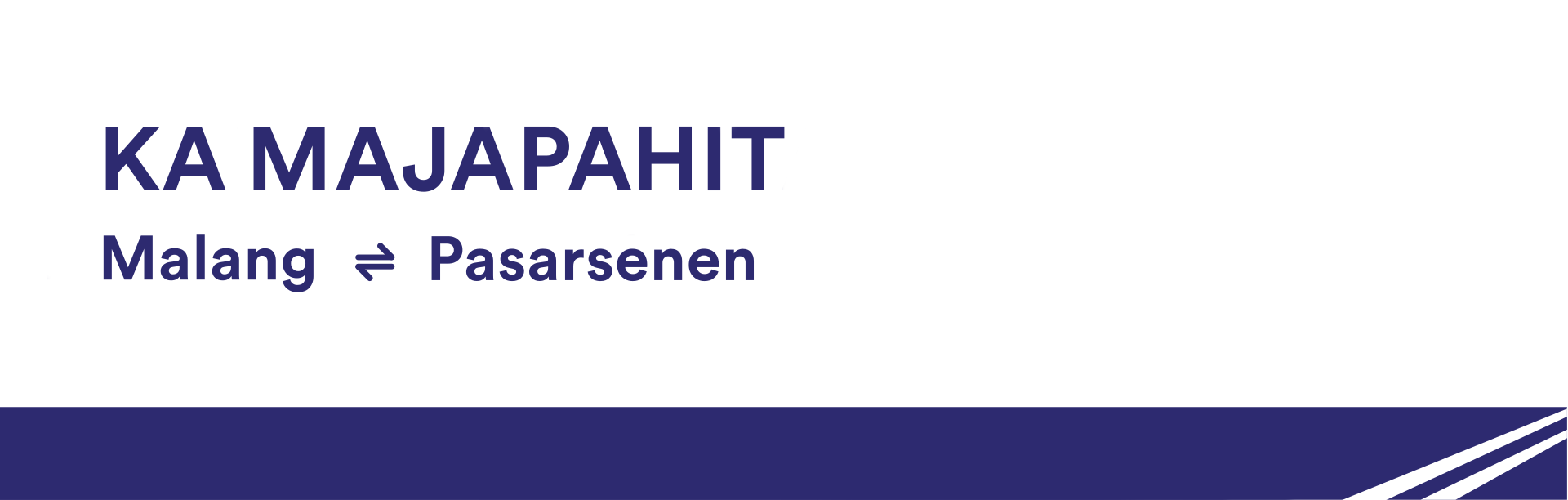

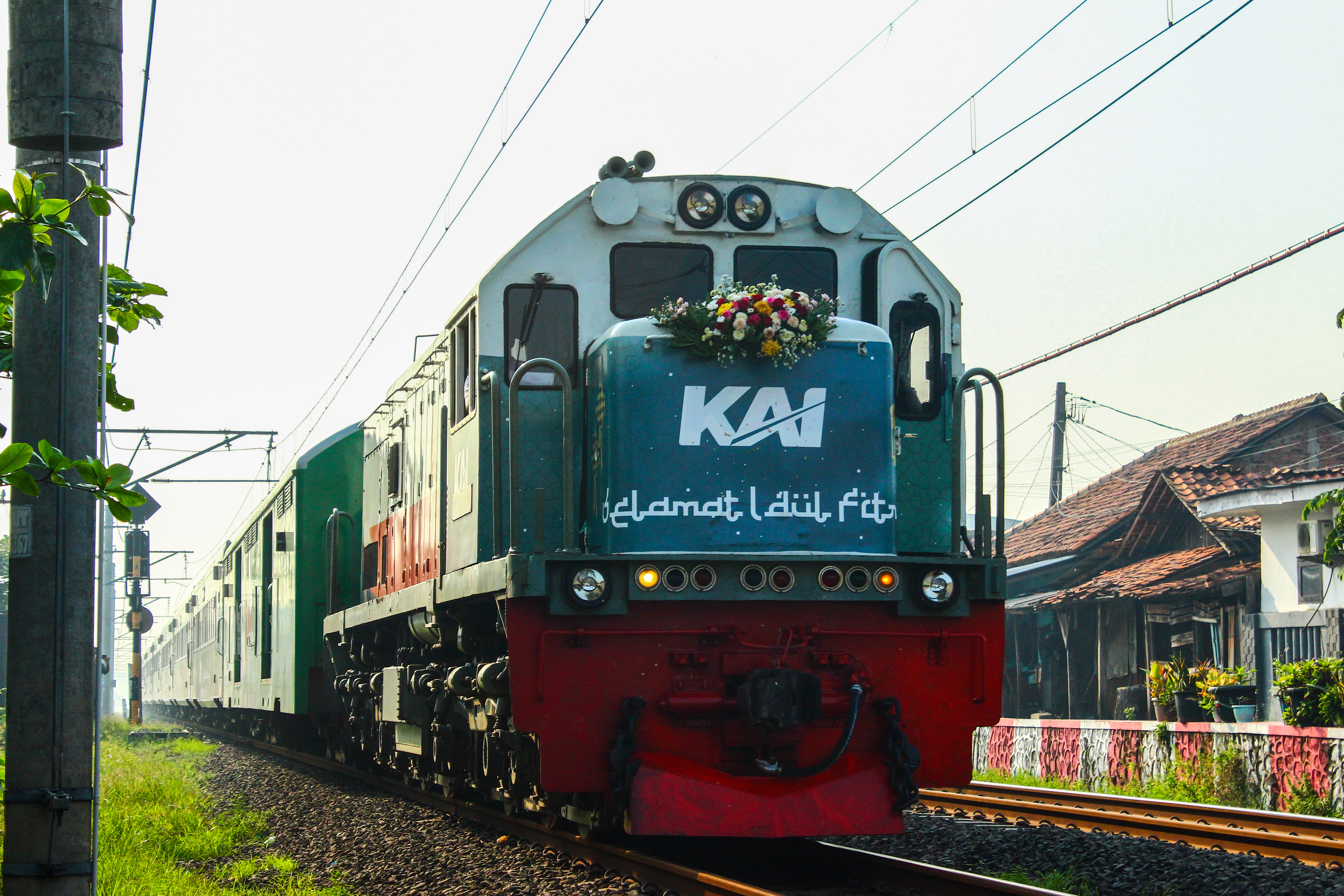
- Majapahit train with the CC201 with Eid al-Fitr livery theme, 2024

Overview
- Service type: Inter-city rail
- Status: Operational
- Locale: Operational Area VIII Surabaya
- Predecessor: Senja Kediri; Senja Singosari
- First service: 21 September 2012; 13 years ago
- Current operator: Kereta Api Indonesia

Route
- Termini: Pasar Senen; Malang
- Distance travelled: 880 kilometres (550 miles)
- Average journey time: 12 hours 57 minutes
- Service frequency: daily each way
- Train number: 245-246

On-board services
- Class: economy
- Seating arrangements: 72 seats arranged 2-2 (economy class)
- Catering facilities: On-board cafe and trolley service
- Baggage facilities: 1 train set cargo baggage

Technical
- Rolling stock: CC203/CC201
- Track gauge: 1,067 mm
- Operating speed: 80–120 kilometres per hour (50–75 mph)
Route map

Majapahit train is a passenger train operated by Kereta Api Indonesia. Its routeconnects Pasar Senen and Malang via Semarang Tawang and Solo Jebres, a distance of around 880 km (550 mil). Scheduled journey time is 12 hours 57 minutes.

This train supports the Matarmaja line with different schedules and stations.

== Brand ==
The name Majapahit comes from a kingdom centered in East Java, Majapahit Empire that existed from around 1293 to 1500. This kingdom reached its peak when it controlled several regions in the Nusantara during the territorial power of Hayam Wuruk.

== History ==
Senja Kediri train service launched on 5 December 2009 to serve the Kediri–Pasar Senen return route via Semarang, using business class train sets. On 23 December 2009, service was extended to Tulungagung, then extended again to Malang on 1 July 2011—then a trial run since 27 June 2011.

Along with a new train travel chart on 1 March 2012, Senja Kediri became Senja Singosari.

This train experienced a downgrade on 21 September 2012, becoming "Majapahit" with economy plus class service with 80 seats per train.

Beginning on 25 March 2024, the Majapahit train used a 2024 stainless steel type economy train manufactured by PT INKA, consisting of one baggage car, eight economy cars, one dining car, and one power car.

Seating capacity was reduced from 80 long seats to 72 captain seats, which can recline and rotate according to the train's direction.

== Amenities ==
Each train is equipped with information screens, displaying nearest station, speed, room temperature, etc.

Each seat is equipped with a USB charging port and a wall outlet.

== Stations ==
Route of the Majapahit train in 2025:

- Pasar Senen (start/end)
- Jatinegara
- Bekasi
- Karawang
- Haurgeulis
- Cirebon Prujakan
- Tegal
- Pekalongan
- Weleri
- Semarang Tawang
- Telawa
- Solo Jebres
- Sragen
- Walikukun
- Ngawi
- Magetan
- Madiun
- Nganjuk
- Kertosono
- Kediri
- Tulungagung
- Ngunut
- Blitar
- Wlingi
- Kepanjen
- Malang Kotalama
- Malang (start/end)

== Incident ==
- On 28 October 2025, the Majapahit train collided with a Honda Beat motorcycle. The driver was injured and sent to hospital in Tulungagung, East Java.

== See also ==
- Majapahit Empire
