= Brawijaya (train) =

Executive class train service in Indonesia

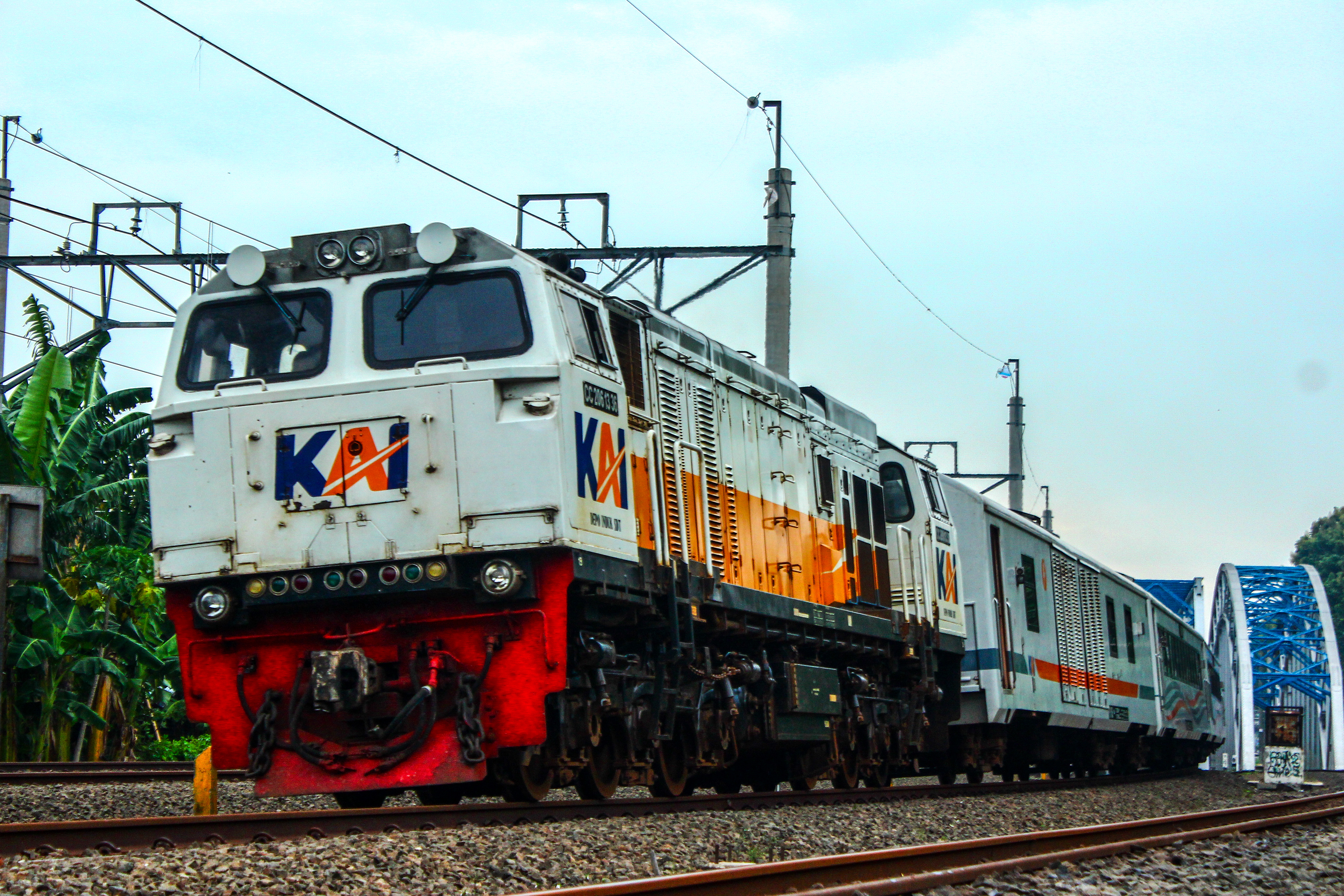
- Brawijaya train 58 leaving from Bekasi, 2024

Overview
- Service type: Inter-city rail
- Status: Operational
- First service: 10 March 2021
- Current operator: Kereta Api Indonesia

Route
- Termini: Gambir; Malang
- Distance travelled: 881 km (547 mil)
- Average journey time: 12 hours 2 minutes
- Service frequency: Daily each way
- Train number: 37-38

On-board services
- Classes: executive & priority
- Seating arrangements: 50 seats arranged 2–2 (executive) seats can recline and rotate; 28 seats arranged 2-2 (priority) seats can recline and swivel
- Catering facilities: On-board cafe and trolley service

Technical
- Rolling stock: CC206; CC203; CC201
- Track gauge: 1067 mm
- Operating speed: 70 - 120 km/h (43 - 75 mph)
Route map

Brawijaya train is an Indonesian passenger train with executive and priority class service it is operated by Kereta Api Indonesia which between Gambir and Malang via Semarang Tawang and Blitar.

The train runs only once daily each way from Jakarta to Malang via Semarang & Blitar around 881 kilometres (547 mi) in 12 hours, 2 minutes on afternoon schedule, also the Brawijaya train support for the Gajayana that which via Yogyakarta at evening schedule.

== Branding ==
The name Brawijaya comes from the king of the same name that who ruled Majapahit Empire. Brawijaya is only known in the babad manuscripts and secondary sources created long after the fall of Majapahit (such as Babad Tanah Jawi or Serat Kandha) and isn't known in primary historical evidence (such as inscriptions).

== History ==
On 10 March 2021, the Brawijaya train was launched by KAI in Gambir station to assist the tasks of previously operating trains such as the Jayabaya train in the Semarang–Surabaya corridor, Majapahit train and Matarmaja train in the Semarang–Surakarta corridor where all three services are on the northern route of Java, and Gajayana in the Jakarta–Purwokerto–Malang corridor from the southern route of Java Island which is the main route of the corridor.

The Brawijaya train also indirectly replaced the position of the Bangunkarta train service which previously served the Surabaya Gubeng Station–Gambir Station route via the northern Java route (Solo Jebres Station–Gundih Station–Semarang Tawang Station) with executive class, but the Bangunkarta train route was also shortened to Jombang Station and Pasar Senen Station and diverted to the southern Java route (Purwokerto–Yogyakarta–Solo Balapan) with executive and economy classes.

Upon arrival in Malang, the Brawijaya train set will be used for the Arjuno Express service with the Malang–Surabaya Gubeng and vice versa.

The Brawijaya train journey covers a distance of 881 km (547 mil) in about 12 hours 55 minutes and the Brawijaya train added a stop at Cikarang railway station starting 1 March 2022.

As of mid-May 2023, before the implementation of the train schedule (Gapeka 2023), the Brawijaya train was transferred to Operational Area VIII Surabaya from Operational Area I Jakarta, and its trainsets were transferred to the Malang Train Depot. This was due to the arrival of two new trains in Gapeka 2023, namely the Argo Semeru and Pandalungan, both of which are under operational ownership of Jakarta Operational Area I.

Starting 3 May 2024, the Brawijaya train has been using the New Image light steel executive trainsets, inherited from the Sembrani. The Sembrani train has now acquired stainless steel trainsets from the Argo Bromo Anggrek.

== List of stations ==
The Brawijaya train will support the Gajayana train that which via Purwokerto and Yogyakarta, while the Brawijaya which via Semarang-Blitar.

- Jakarta Gambir (Start/End)
- Jatinegara (Only from Malang)
- Bekasi
- Cikarang
- Cirebon
- Tegal
- Pekalongan
- Semarang Tawang
- Solo Jebres
- Madiun
- Nganjuk
- Kertosono
- Kediri
- Tulungagung
- Blitar
- Kepanjen
- Wlingi
- Malang Kotalama
- Malang (Start/End)

== Incident ==
On 23 October 2023, at 03.00 WIB, the Brawijaya train heading to Malang hit a sand-laden truck at a level crossing in Gampengrejo District, Kediri Regency, East Java; precisely in the section between Papar and Kediri Stations on the Kertosono–Bangil railway line. Although there were no fatalities or injuries in the incident, the locomotive was damaged because it was caught in the truck. As a result of the incident, train traffic on the section between Kertosono and Kediri was disrupted so that train Gajayana number 56 from Jakarta Gambir and Malabar number 122 from Bandung had to be diverted via the Kertosono–Wonokromo railway line in the Kertosono–Surabaya corridor and the branch line Tarik station–Sidoarjo.

== See also ==
- Gajayana
- Malabar
