= Kertanegara (train) =

Passenger train in Indonesia

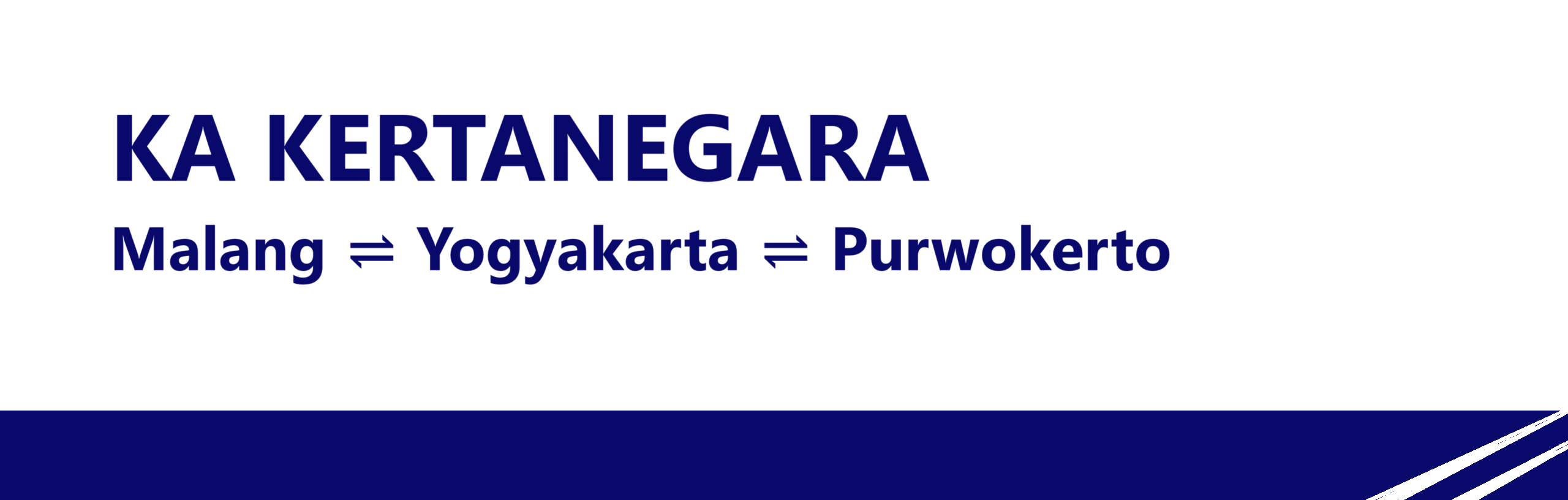

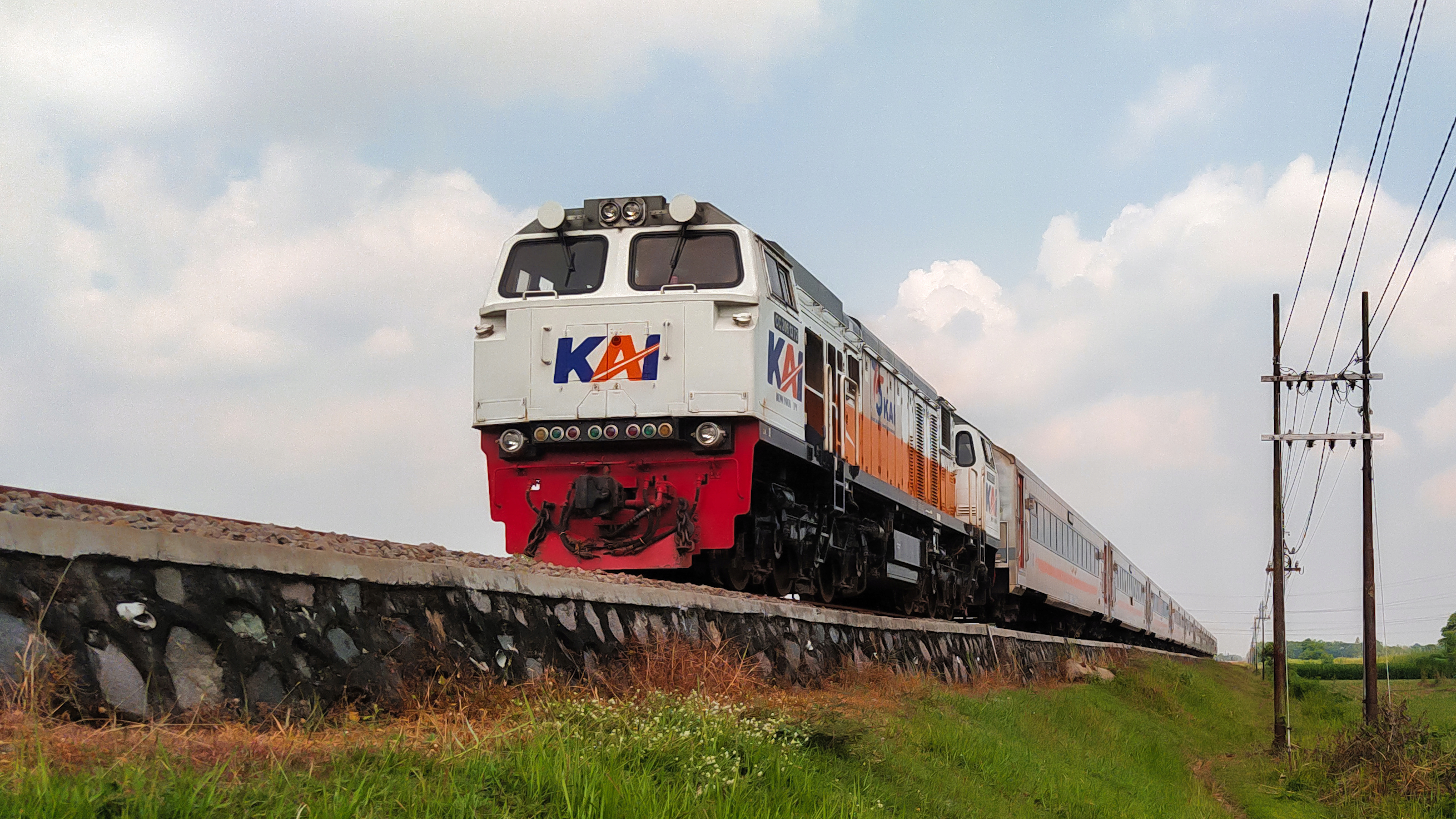
- Kertanegara train approaching Purwosari, 2021

Overview
- Service type: Inter-city rail
- Status: Operational
- Locale: Operational Area VIII Surabaya
- First service: 10 March 2021
- Current operator: Kereta Api Indonesia

Route
- Termini: Purwokerto; Malang
- Distance travelled: 559 kilometres (347 miles)
- Average journey time: 8 hours 43 minutes
- Service frequency: daily each way
- Train number: 167-168

On-board services
- Classes: economy and executive
- Seating arrangements: 50 seats arranged 2-2 (executive class); 80 seats arranged 2-2 (economy class)
- Catering facilities: On-board cafe and trolley service

Technical
- Rolling stock: CC206; CC203; CC201
- Track gauge: 1,067 mm
- Operating speed: 80–120 kilometres per hour (50–75 mph)
Route map
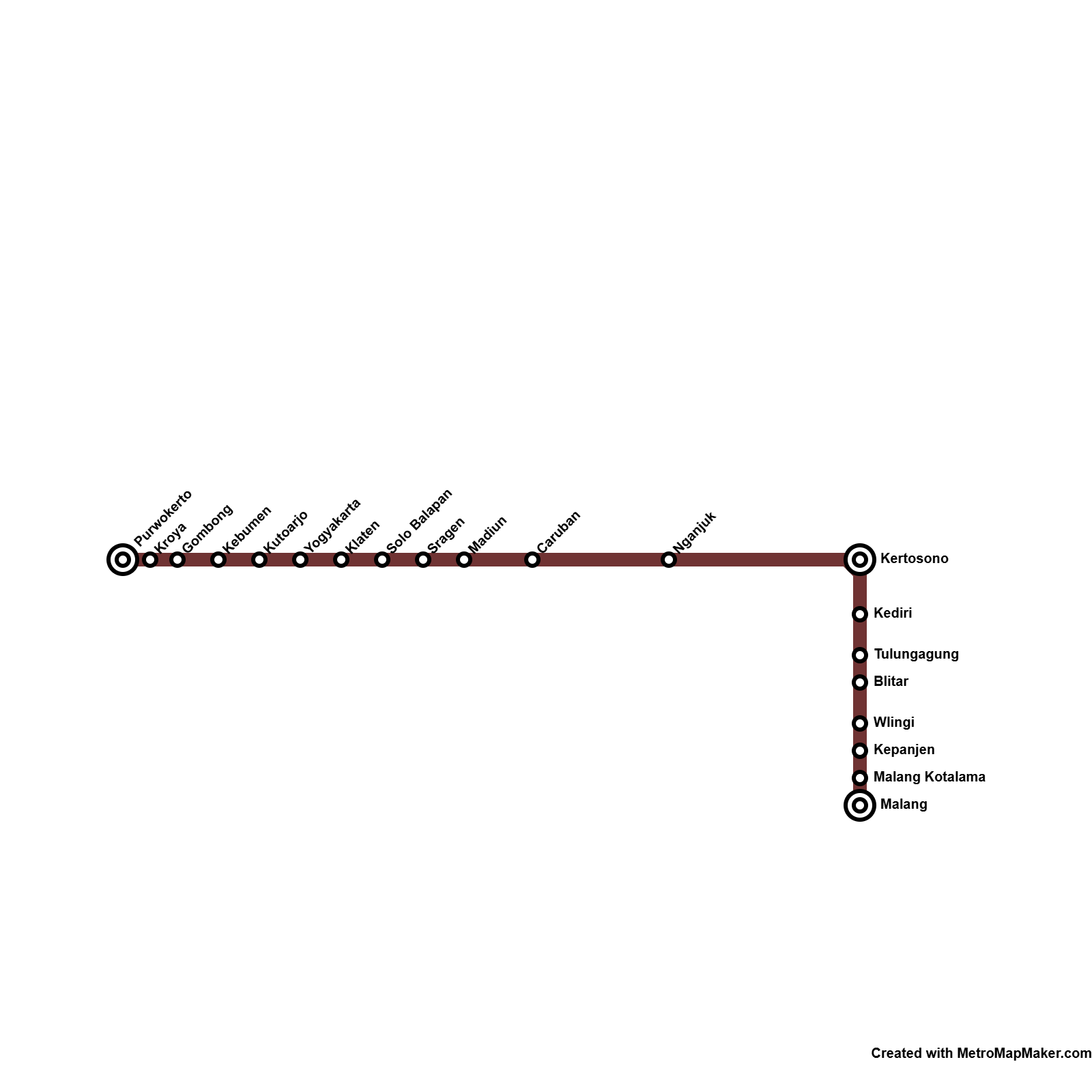

Kertanegara train is an Indonesian intercity passenger train operated by Kereta Api Indonesia (KAI). It serves the Malang–Purwokerto service via major cities such as Madiun, Solo Balapan, and Yogyakarta. Kertanegara commenced service in March 2021 with one trip in each direction daily. The train provides an additional long-distance travel option on the southern Java corridor, which had previously been served by the Gajayana service.

== History ==
The name Kertanegara is taken from Sri Maharaja Kertanegara, the last king of the Singhasari kingdom in East Java, who ruled around 1268–1292, and is part of KAI's practice of using the names of Nusantara kings for several of its services as a form of historical commemoration.

Kertanegara was officially launched on 10 March 2021. The inaugural departure left Malang Station at 08.20 WIB and was scheduled to arrive at Purwokerto at 17.17 WIB, while the reverse service departed from Purwokerto at 18.20 WIB. The first trip carried 106 passengers out of a capacity of 333 seats, in line with health protocols that limited occupancy during the COVID-19 pandemic. The formation at launch consisted of five executive coaches and three economy coaches. Kertanegara was introduced to add another travel option on the southern route, which had long been served by KA Gajayana on the Gambir–Malang relation.

On 26 January 2022, Kertanegara underwent a rolling stock change. The executive class coaches were replaced by non-stainless-steel stock from Depo Malang, while the economy class coaches were replaced by 2016-built stock from Depo Bandung that had been modified with reclining seats similar to premium-class seating.

Under the timetable update effective 1 February 2025, Kertanegara's schedule and journey times were adjusted. From Malang, departure moved from 08.00 WIB to 08.25 WIB, with the travel time becoming 8 hours 57 minutes. From Purwokerto, the departure time remains 18.40 WIB, with the journey shortened to 8 hours 30 minutes compared with the previous timetable.

== Stations ==
Kertanegara serves the Malang–Purwokerto corridor and stops at the following stations:

- Purwokerto (start/end)
- Kroya
- Gombong
- Kebumen
- Kutoarjo
- Yogyakarta
- Klaten
- Solo Balapan
- Sragen
- Madiun
- Caruban
- Nganjuk
- Kertosono
- Kediri
- Tulungagung
- Blitar
- Wlingi
- Kepanjen
- Malang Kotalama
- Malang (start/end)

== Incident ==
- On 10 March 2025, the Kertanegara train crashed into a fertilizer truck at a level crossing at kilometer 175+4 of the Kras-Ngadiluwih road in Kediri Regency, resulting in the driver being injured and one death. As a result of the incident, several train journeys were delayed for approximately 7 hours and several trains were diverted.

== See also ==
- Malioboro Express
