= Jayabaya (train) =

Passenger train service in Indonesia

Jayabaya train

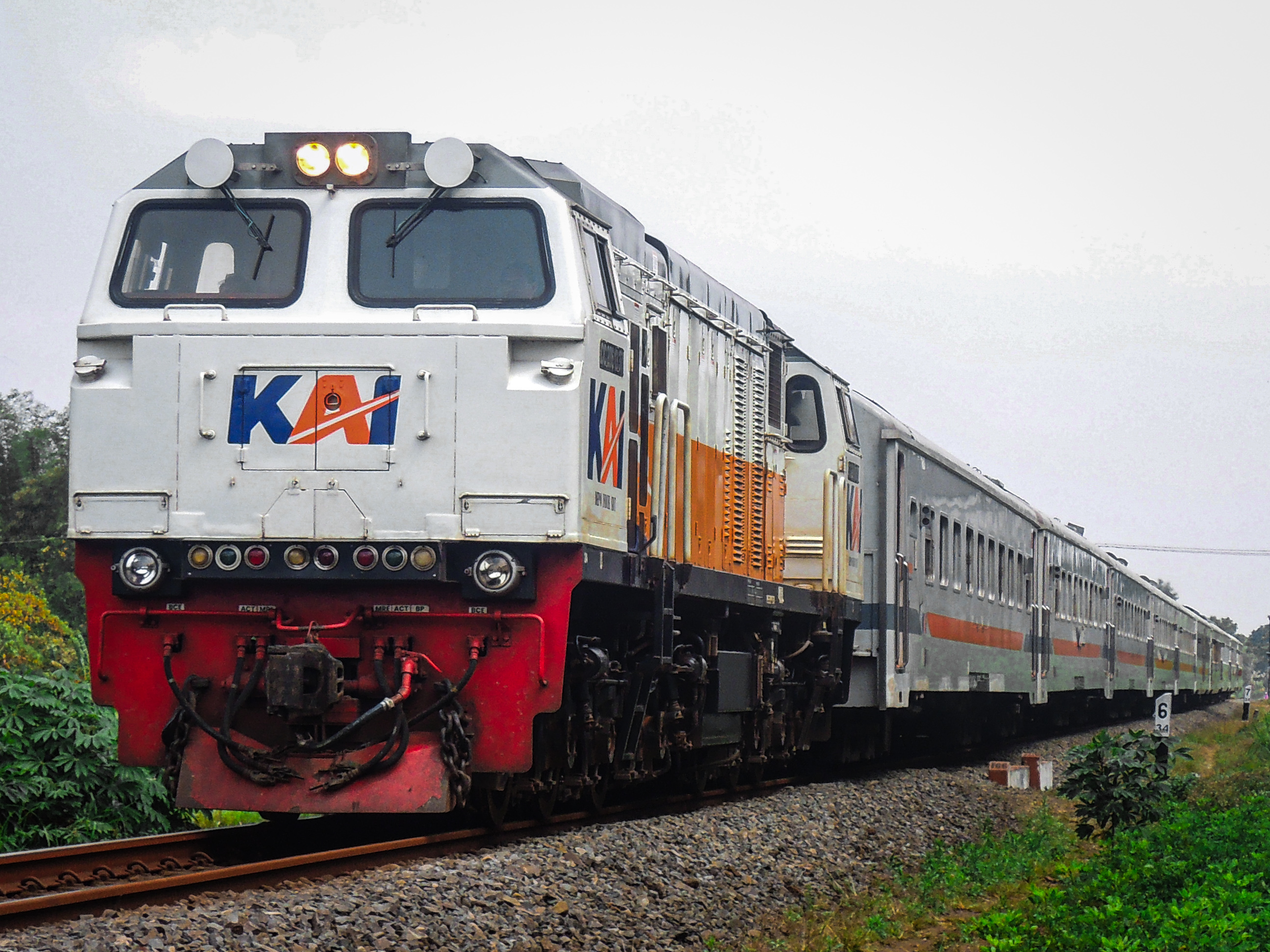
- Jayabaya train passing in Lawang, East Java, 2024

Overview
- Service type: Inter-city rail
- Status: Operational
- Locale: Operational Area I Jakarta
- First service: 18 October 2014
- Current operator: Kereta Api Indonesia

Route
- Termini: Pasar Senen; Malang
- Distance travelled: 817 km (507 miles)
- Average journey time: 12 hours 21 minutes
- Service frequency: daily each way
- Train number: 91-94

On-board services
- Classes: economy and executive
- Seating arrangements: 50 seats arranged 2-2 (executive class); 72 seats arranged 2-2 (economy class)
- Catering facilities: On-board cafe and trolley service
- Observation facilities: The duplex panoramic glass, with blinds, heat insulating laminated layer
- Entertainment facilities: free Wi-Fi, Air conditioning Passenger information system, USB, etc

Technical
- Rolling stock: CC206
- Track gauge: 1,067 mm
- Operating speed: 80–120 kilometres per hour (50–75 mph)
Route map

Jayabaya train is an Indonesian intercity passenger train operated by Kereta Api Indonesia (KAI), serving the Pasar Senen–Malang service round-trip. It was launched to meet high demand for medium and long-distance rail transport between Jakarta and Malang, complementing existing services on the route.

== History ==
Jayabaya train entered service on 18 October 2014, inaugurated at Pasar Senen station. At launch, it operated as an economy-class service using newly built coaches from Industri Kereta Api (INKA) designed for better comfort, including air conditioning, power outlets at each seat, and coaches arranged to also accommodate passengers with disabilities. The name "Jayabaya" was chosen to honor King Jayabaya of the Kediri Kingdom who is well known in Javanese tradition for his prophecies.

Jayabaya uses the northern Java corridor, which already has double-tracking, allowing a significantly faster journey time compared to southern-route trains connecting Malang and Jakarta. The initial ticketing was subsidized as Public service obligation, with fares between Rp 250,000 and a promotional fare discount of Rp 185,000 applied during 18–20 October 2014.

On 26 September 2023, Jayabaya became the first long-distance train to receive the new-generation economy coaches modified by Manggarai Railway Workshop, featuring reclining and reversible captain-style seats and reduced capacity for greater comfort.

Further upgrades were introduced on 16 October 2024, when the service began operating stainless-steel new-generation trainsets built by INKA, continuing the transition to improved passenger facilities.

== Station ==
Based on 2025 train travel chart, Jayabaya serves the following principal stations:

- Malang (start/end)
- Lawang
- Bangil
- Sidoarjo
- Surabaya Gubeng
- Surabaya Pasarturi
- Bojonegoro
- Cepu
- Randublatung
- Ngrombo
- Semarang Poncol
- Weleri
- Pekalongan
- Pemalang
- Tegal
- Cirebon
- Jatibarang
- Cikampek
- Bekasi
- Jatinegara
- Pasar Senen (start/end)

== Incident ==
- On 3 February 2015, Jayabaya train on the Jakarta–Malang service derailed between Ujungnegoro and Kuripan after heavy rainfall caused a rail foundation pillar to subside by around 40 centimeters.

Five wheelsets on four cars left the track. All 455 passengers on board were evacuated, and the train was taken to Semarang Poncol for inspection, while repairs were carried out to the affected section of track.
