= Blitar railway station =

Railway station in Indonesia

Blitar Station Stasiun Blitar Setatsiyun Blitar PD35

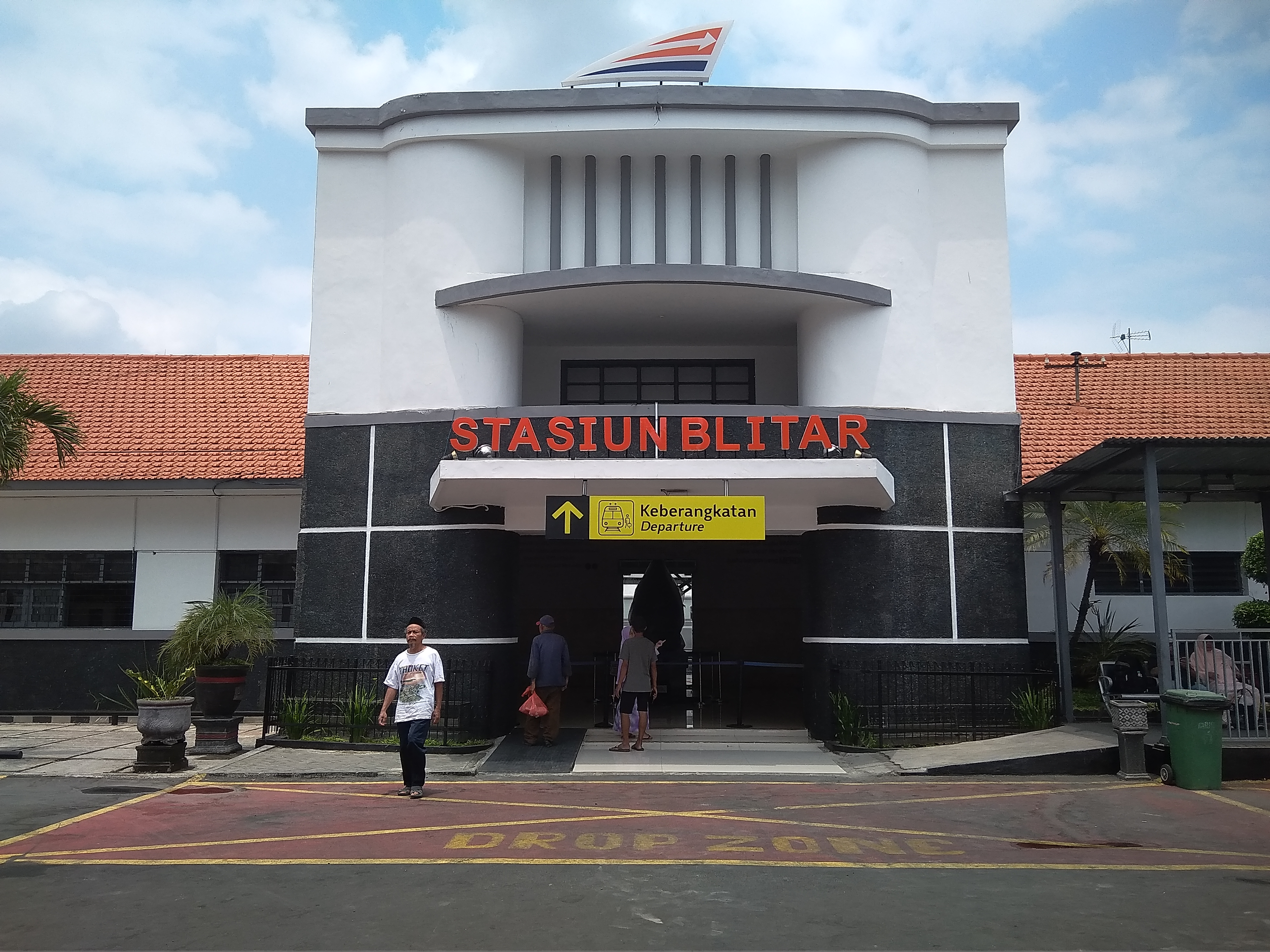
- Blitar Station in 2019

General information
- Location: Jl. Mastrip 75, Kepanjenkidul, Kepanjenkidul, Blitar; East Java; Indonesia
- Coordinates: 8°06′05″S 112°09′47″E
- Elevation: +167 m (548 ft)
- Owner: Kereta Api Indonesia
- Operator: Kereta Api Indonesia
- Line: Kertosono–Bangil
- Platforms: 1 side platform 2 island platforms
- Tracks: 8

Construction
- Structure type: Ground
- Parking: Available
- Accessible: Available

Other information
- Station code: BL

History
- Opened: June 16, 1884
- Rebuilt: 1950s

Services
Preceding station		Following station
Rejotangan PD34 One-way operation	Commuter Line Penataran East Java Circular Line (clockwise)	Garum PD36 towards Kertosono or Surabaya Kota
Garum PD36 One-way operation	Commuter Line Dhoho East Java Circular Line (counter-clockwise)	Rejotangan PD34 towards Malang or Surabaya Kota
Location
- Location within Java

Blitar Train Station (station code: BL) is a railway station in the district of Kepanjenkidul, Kepanjenkidul, Blitar, East Java, Indonesia. It was opened in 1884 by the Dutch East Indies government, making it one of the oldest railway stations in East Java.

This station serves all passenger and freight trains traversing the Kertosono-Malang branch line of the southern Java railway corridor.

There is a locomotive depot and a former turntable at this station. There is a statue and photo of the first President of Indonesia, Sukarno, inside the station, as he was buried in Blitar.

== Services ==
The railway services that stopped at this station:

• Brantas (151-152) (Blitar - Pasar Senen via Semarang Tawang)

• Gajayana (35-36) (Malang - Gambir via Yogyakarta)

• Brawijaya (37-38) (Malang - Gambir via Semarang Tawang)

• Kahuripan (273-274) (Blitar - Kiaracondong)

• Majapahit (245-246) (Malang - Pasar Senen via Semarang Tawang)

• Malabar (67-70) (Malang - Bandung)

• Kertanegara (167-168) (Malang - Purwokerto)

• Malioboro Express (169-170) (Malang - Purwokerto)

• Singasari (149-150) (Blitar - Pasar Senen via Lempuyangan)

• Matarmaja (269A-270) (Malang - Pasar Senen via Semarang Tawang)

• Commuter Line Dhoho (Surabaya Kota - Kertosono - Blitar - Malang - Surabaya Kota) (counterclockwise loop)

• Commuter Line Penataran (Surabaya Kota - Malang - Blitar - Kertosono - Surabaya Kota) (clockwise loop)

== Gallery ==
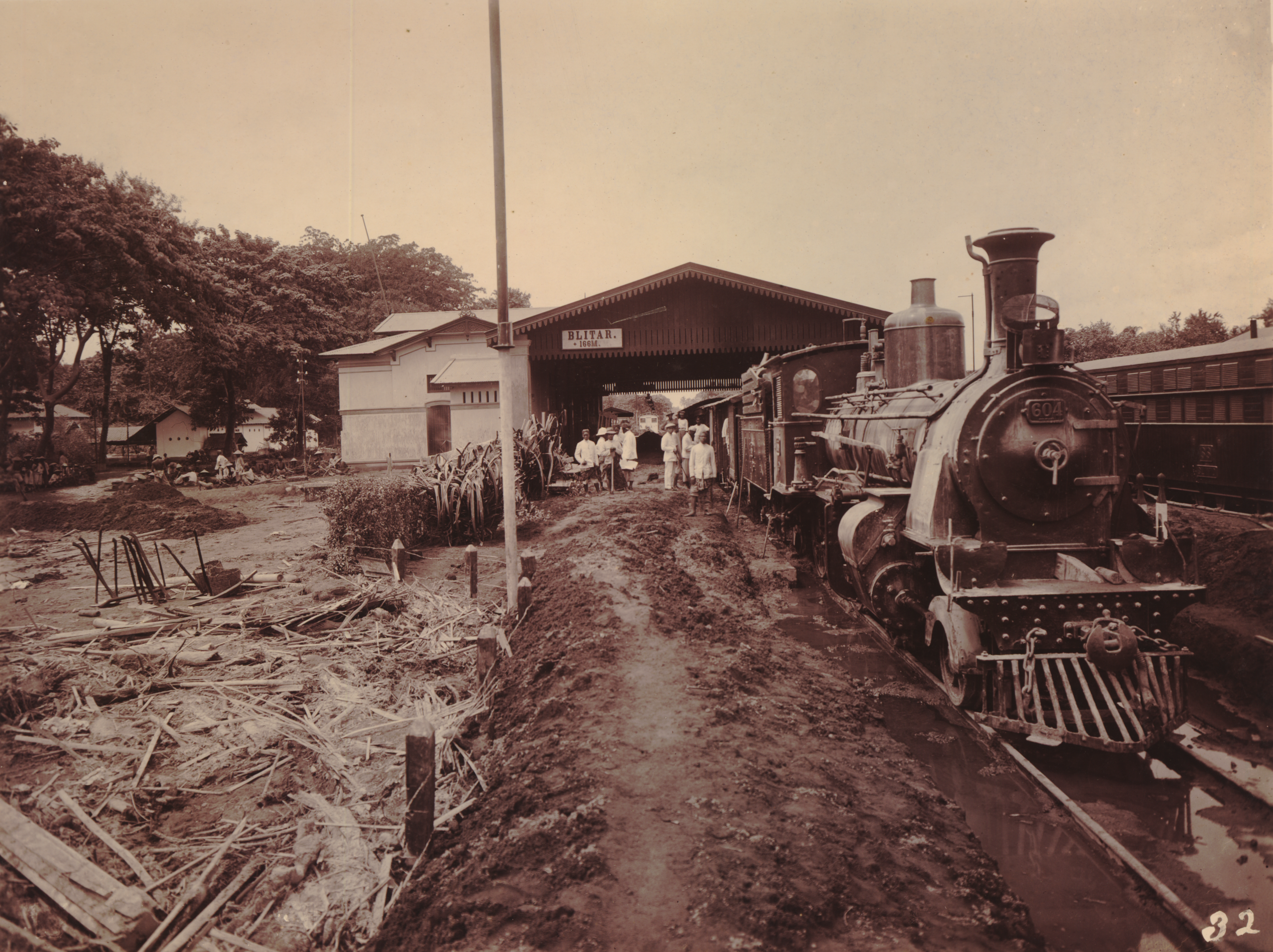
A damaged Blitar station after the eruption of stratovolcano Mount Kelud in 1919.

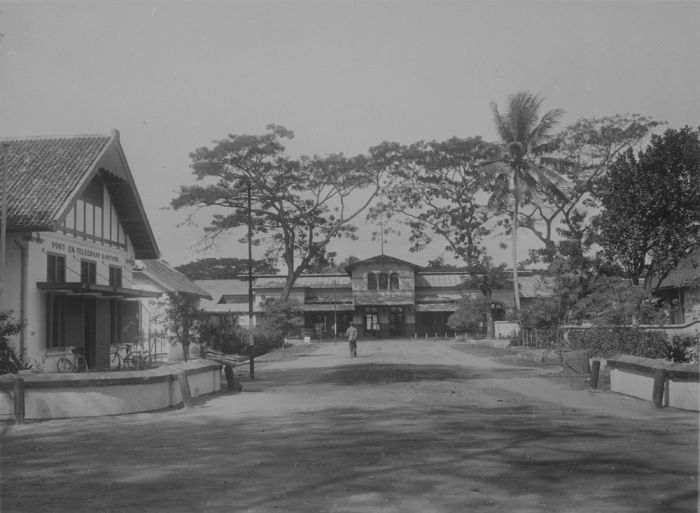
Blitar station during the 1920s to 1930s. The telegraph office on the left is still there, but it is now used as a post office.

Preceding station	Kereta Api Indonesia	Following station
Bendo towards Kertosono	Kertosono–Bangil	Gebang towards Bangil
