= Matarmaja =

Economy class passenger train in Indonesia

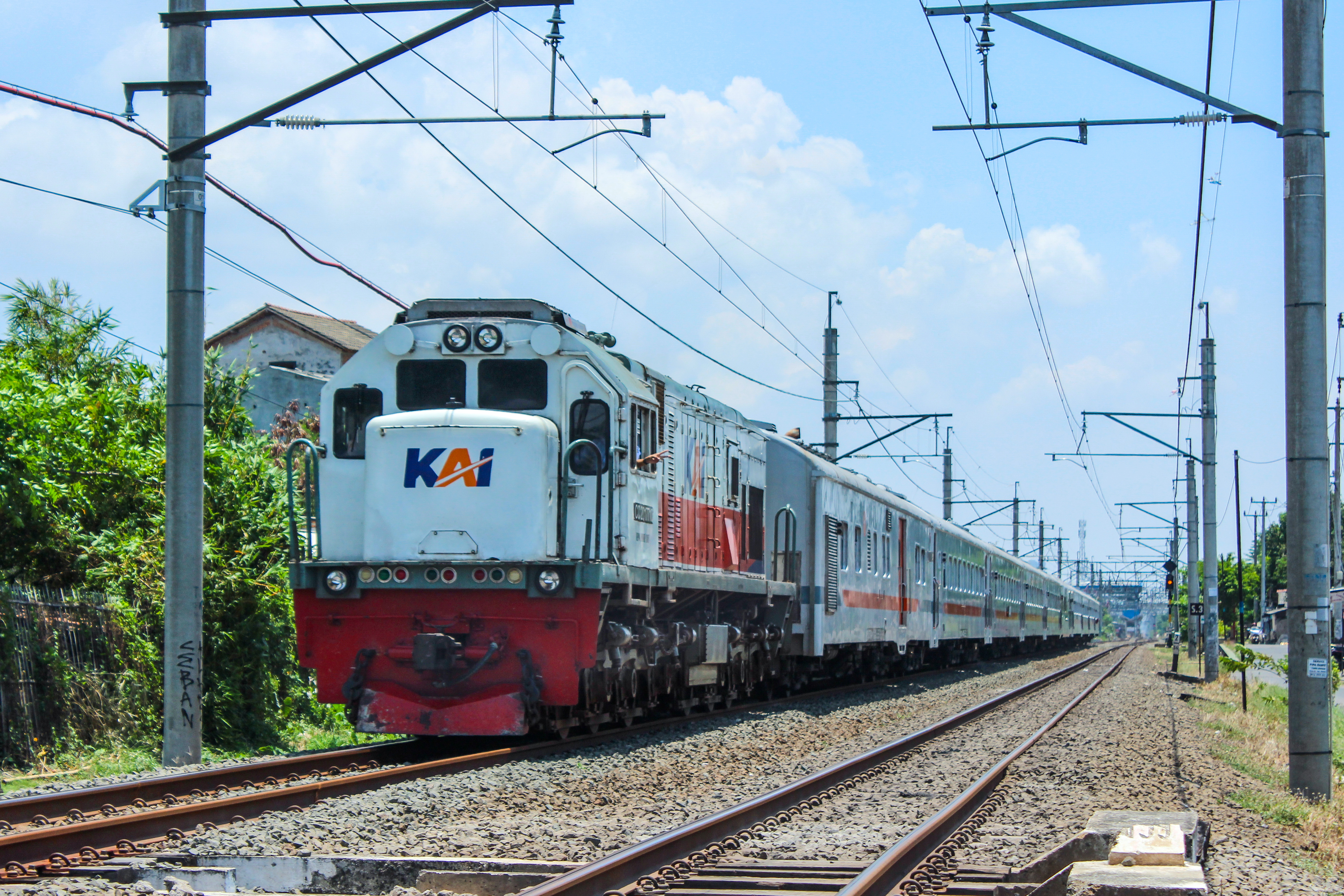
- Matarmaja train with the economy new generation modification, 2025

Overview
- Service type: Inter-city rail
- Status: Operational
- Locale: Operational Area VIII Surabaya
- Predecessor: Maja and Tatar train (1976–1983)
- First service: 28 September 1983; 42 years ago
- Current operator: Kereta Api Indonesia

Route
- Termini: Pasar Senen; Malang
- Distance travelled: 880 kilometres (550 miles)
- Average journey time: 15 hours 29 minutes
- Service frequency: daily each way
- Train number: 269–270

On-board services
- Class: economy
- Seating arrangements: 72 seats arranged 2-2 (economy class)
- Catering facilities: On-board café and trolley service

Technical
- Rolling stock: CC203; CC201
- Track gauge: 1,067 mm
- Operating speed: 80–100 kilometres per hour (50–62 mph)
- Depot: Malang
Matarmaja train Route Geographic map in 2025

Matarmaja is an Indonesian passenger train operated by Kereta Api Indonesia, which runs between Pasar Senen and Malang via Semarang Poncol and Solo Jebres.

== Origin of the name ==
The name Matarmaja is a portmanteau of the names of the cities that this train passes through, namely Malang, Blitar, Madiun and Jakarta.

== History ==
=== Tatar and Maja ===
The operational history of the Matarmaja train began with the launch of the Maja train in 1976 which served the Madiun–Jakarta route via Yogyakarta. To meet customer demand, PJKA launched the Tatar train, a feeder train from Madiun Station to Blitar Station with a train set consisting of 1 BW and 3 CW cars—later an additional BW car was added. Upon arrival in Madiun, the Tatar train set was connected to the Maja train set to continue the journey to Jakarta. The Tatarmaja train at that time consisted of economy and business class services until the business class service was removed in 2002.

=== Matarmaja ===
In 1990s, the route was changed so that the Matarmaja train operated via the northern route (via Semarang) although it was returned to its original state until the launch of the Gajayana train in 1999.

Since the revocation of the public service obligation subsidy on 1 January 2019 until the implementation of the enactment of new train travel chart 2025, the Matarmaja train hasn't received any rejuvenation and still uses a split AC economy train set with 106 seats.

== Incident and Accident ==
- On 4 December 2024 – the train from Malang to Pasar Senen hit an ambulance at a level crossing barrier in Nyawangan, Kras, Kediri at 13:00 WIB. In the incident, the ambulance driver, 29-year-old Mohamad Ali Mustopa died after suffering serious injuries to his right hand and head.
- In January 2025 – the Matarmaja train on the Malang–Pasar Senen route became the intercity train with the highest passenger volume, reaching 32,844 passengers, exceeding 100% of its maximum capacity. For the reverse route, Pasar Senen–Malang, Matarmaja ranked fourth as the intercity train with the highest passenger volume, reaching 27,001 passengers.

== In popular culture ==
The Matarmaja train was once used as the setting for one of the scenes in the film 5 cm, which was adapted from the novel of the same title by Donny Dhirgantoro. In the story, the characters travel from Jakarta to Malang to climb Mount Semeru (before was inspired as the train name of the Argo Semeru since 1 June 2023).

== Station ==
Scheduled stations for the train:

- Pasar Senen (start/end)
- Jatinegara
- Bekasi
- Cikarang
- Pegaden Baru
- Terisi
- Jatibarang
- Cirebon Prujakan
- Babakan
- Brebes
- Tegal
- Pekalongan
- Weleri
- Semarang Poncol
- Kedung Jati
- Telawa
- Solo Jebres
- Sragen
- Walikukun
- Ngawi
- Magetan
- Madiun
- Nganjuk
- Kertosono
- Kediri
- Tulungagung
- Ngunut
- Blitar
- Wlingi
- Kesamben
- Sumber Pucung
- Kepanjen
- Malang Kotalama
- Malang (start/end)
