= Kertosono railway station =

Railway station in Indonesia

Kertosono Station Stasiun Kertosono
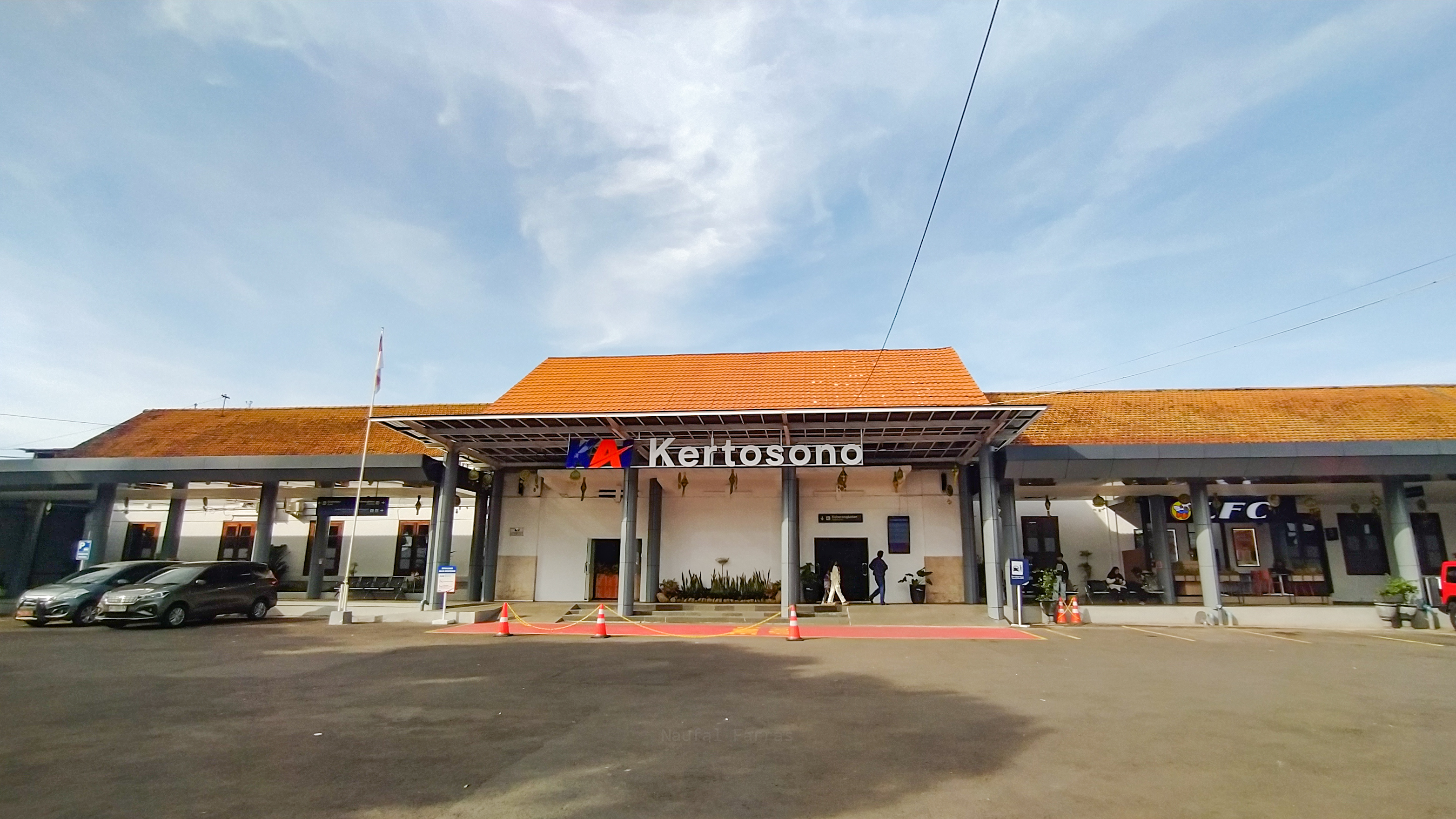
- The front view of Kertosono railway station, 2024

General information
- Location: Kertosono Station Road; Banaran, Kertosono, Nganjuk; East Java; Indonesia
- Coordinates: 7°35′32″S 112°6′2″E
- Elevation: +43 m (141 ft)
- System: Inter-city rail and regional rail station
- Operator: Kereta Api Indonesia
- Lines: Solo Balapan–Kertosono; Kertosono–Wonokromo; Kertosono–Bangil
- Platforms: 1 side platform 4 island platforms
- Tracks: 7

Construction
- Structure type: Ground
- Parking: Available
- Accessible: Available

Other information
- Station code: KTS
- Classification: Type-B major railway station

Services
Preceding station		Following station
Sembung One-way operation	Commuter Line Dhoho SB-SB East Java Circular Line (counter-clockwise)	Purwoasri towards
Sembung One-way operation	Commuter Line Dhoho SB-ML East Java Circular Line (counter-clockwise)	Purwoasri towards
Sembung One-way operation	Commuter Line Dhoho SB-BL East Java Circular Line (counter-clockwise)	Purwoasri towards
Sembung One-way operation	Commuter Line Dhoho East Java Circular Line (counter-clockwise)	Terminus
Purwoasri One-way operation	Commuter Line Penataran SB-SB East Java Circular Line (clockwise)	Sembung towards
Purwoasri One-way operation	Commuter Line Penataran ML-SB East Java Circular Line (clockwise)	Sembung towards
Purwoasri One-way operation	Commuter Line Penataran BL-SB East Java Circular Line (clockwise)	Sembung towards
Terminus	Commuter Line Penataran East Java Circular Line (clockwise)	Sembung towards Surabaya Kota
Location
- Location within Java

Kertosono Station (station code: KTS) is a type-B major railway station in Banaran, Kertosono, Nganjuk Regency, East Java, Indonesia, operated by Kereta Api Indonesia, located at 400 m south of Kertosono Market. The station is the most eastern and the largest railway station in Nganjuk Regency.

The station is the terminus of Solo Balapan–Kertosono, Kertosono–Wonokromo and Kertosono–Bangil railway lines.

== Services ==
=== Passenger services ===
==== Executive class ====
- Argo Wilis, destination of Bandung and Surabaya Gubeng
- Bima & Argo Semeru, destination of Gambir via Yogyakarta and Surabaya Gubeng
- Gajayana, destination of Gambir via Yogyakarta and Malang
- Turangga, destination of Bandung and Surabaya Gubeng
- Brawijaya, destination of Gambir via Semarang Tawang and Malang

==== Mixed class ====
- Mutiara Selatan, destination of Bandung and Surabaya Gubeng (executive-economy)
- Malabar, destination of Bandung and Malang (executive-business-economy)
- Singasari, destination of Pasar Senen via Lempuyangan and Blitar (executive-economy)
- Gaya Baru Malam Selatan, destination of Pasar Senen via Lempuyangan and Surabaya Gubeng (executive-economy)
- Brantas, destination of Pasar Senen via Semarang Tawang and Blitar
- Ranggajati, destination of Cirebon and Jember
- Wijayakusuma, destination of Cilacap and Ketapang
- Bangunkarta, destination of Pasar Senen via Lempuyangan and Jombang (executive-economy)
- Kertanegara, destination of Purwokerto and Malang (executive-economy)
- Malioboro Express, destination of Yogyakarta and Malang (executive-economy)
- Sancaka, destination of Yogyakarta and Surabaya Gubeng (executive-economy)
- Logawa, destination of Purwokerto and Jember (business-economy)

==== Economy class ====
- Majapahit, destination of Pasar Senen via Semarang Tawang and Malang
- Jayakarta, destination of Pasar Senen and Surabaya Gubeng
- Matarmaja, destination of Pasar Senen via Semarang Tawang and Malang
- Kahuripan, destination of Kiaracondong and Blitar
- Pasundan, destination of Kiaracondong and Surabaya Gubeng
- Sri Tanjung, destination of Lempuyangan and Ketapang

==== Local/regional train ====
- Dhoho, destination of Surabaya Kota and Blitar
- Kertosono Local Train, destination of Surabaya Kota

=== Freight services ===
- Over Night Services, destination of Surabaya Kota and destination of:
  - Bandung via Yogyakarta-Kroya-Tasikmalaya
  - Jakarta Gudang via Lempuyangan-Purwokerto-Cirebon Prujakan

Preceding station	Kereta Api Indonesia	Following station
Baron towards Solo Balapan	Solo Balapan–Kertosono	Terminus
Terminus	Kertosono–Wonokromo	Sembung towards Wonokromo
Terminus	Kertosono–Bangil	Purwoasri towards Bangil
