= Malang railway station =

Railway station in Indonesia

Malang Station Stasiun Malang PD24 TA02

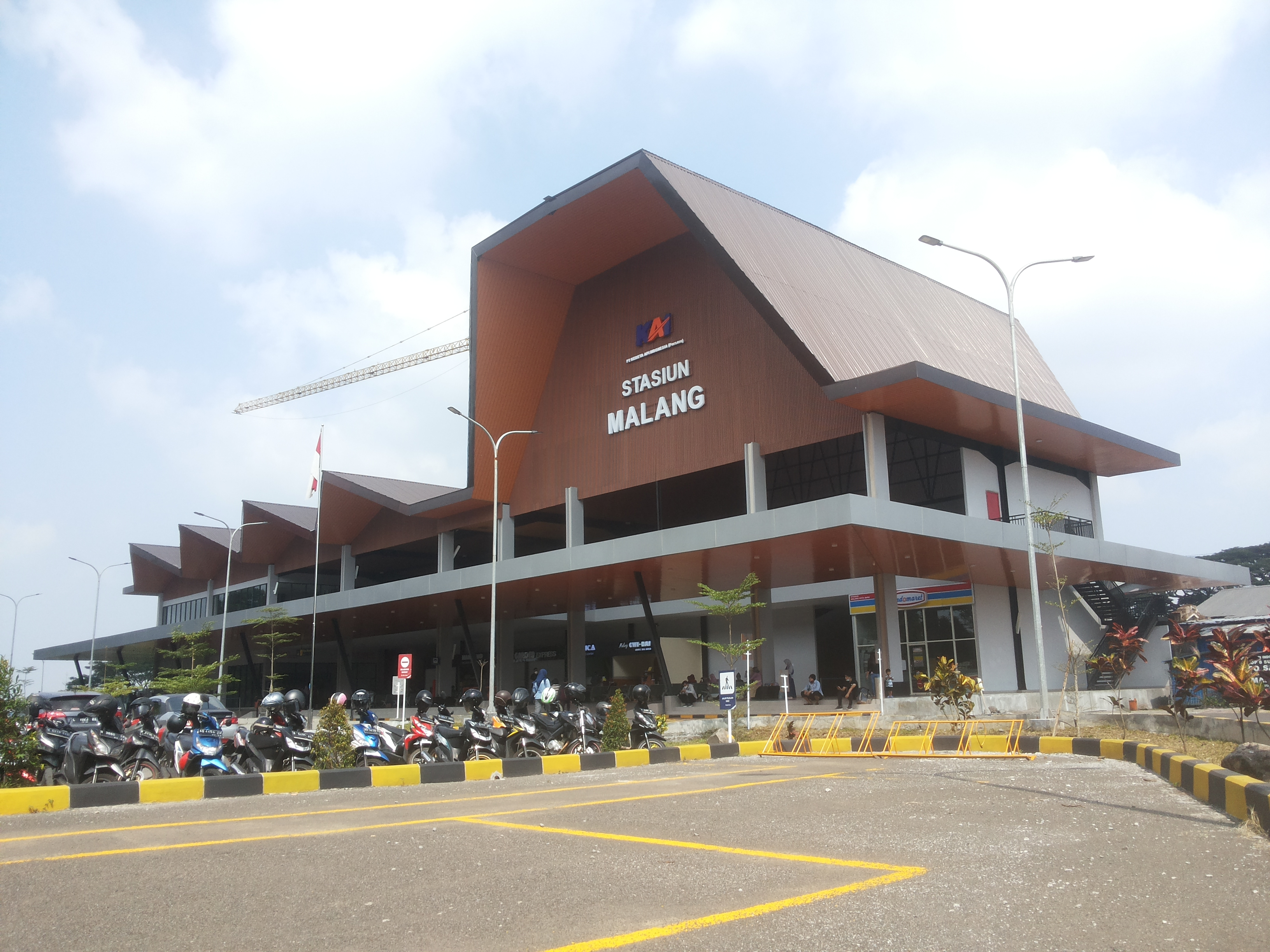
- The newly built east building of Malang station, 2022

General information
- Other names: Malang Kotabaru Station
- Location: Jl. Trunojoyo, Kiduldalem, Klojen, Malang; East Java; Indonesia
- Coordinates: 7°58′40″S 112°38′14″E
- Elevation: +444 m (1,457 ft)
- Owner: Kereta Api Indonesia
- Operator: Kereta Api Indonesia
- Line: Kertosono–Bangil
- Platforms: 1 side platform 2 Island platforms
- Tracks: 9

Construction
- Structure type: Ground
- Parking: Available
- Cycle facilities: Bicycle parking
- Accessible: Available
- Architect: W.J. van der Eb
- Architectural style: Art deco (west building); Modern and traditional (east building)

Other information
- Station code: ML • 5100

History
- Opened: 1879
- Rebuilt: 1941

Services
Preceding station		Following station
Blimbing PD23 One-way operation	Commuter Line Penataran East Java Circular Line (clockwise)	Malang Kotalama PD25 towards Blitar, Kertosono or Surabaya Kota
Malang Kotalama PD25 One-way operation	Commuter Line Dhoho East Java Circular Line (counter-clockwise)	Blimbing PD23 towards Surabaya Kota
Location
- Location within Java

Malang Station is a railway station in Malang City, East Java. The station is located at an altitude of approximately +444 meters amsl. It is the largest train station in Malang City. The existing building of Malang station was built in 1941 based on the work of J. van der Eb. The station is sometimes referred to as Malang Kotabaru Station to distinguish it from the original 1879 building of Malang station (not Malang Kotalama Station).

The new building is used for inter-city train service, while the old building is for local commuter train services, which is now adjacent to the train depot and locomotive functions as an office and warehouse for storing railway maintenance tools.

== History ==
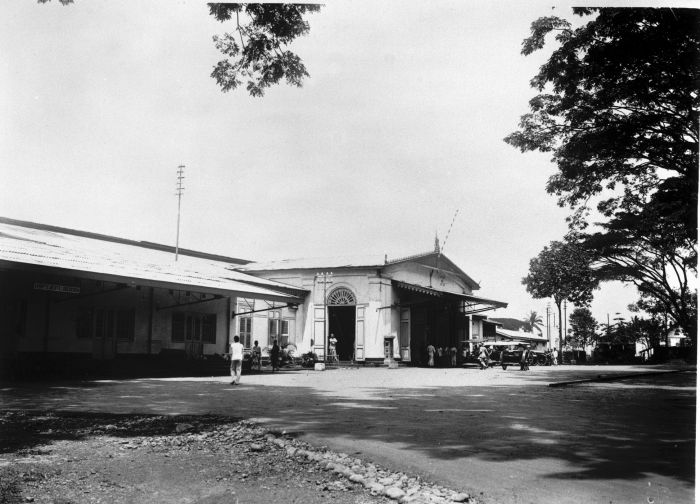
Original 1879 building of Malang Station that was demolished for 1941 van der Eb building

Malang station was built along with the pioneering of the Surabaya–Malang–Pasuruan railway construction in circa 1870 to transport crops and plantation products from the rural areas of East Java. The conssesion of the railway construction issued five years later, and officially opened on 20 July 1879.

The original building was on the east side, from where the building is now. It was demolished in circa 1930 by Staatsspoorwegen because that building was considered to be unable to accommodate the increasing number of passengers, a new, larger building was made on the west side, designed by W.J. van der Eb.

In April 2018, Kereta Api Indonesia and the Malang City Government unveiled the revitalization plan for the Malang station complex, in order to accommodate the increase of passenger numbers. The first work was the rearrangement of the parking lot. The groundbreaking ceremony of the new building of Malang station on the east side was conducted on 24 September 2019 by the Mayor of Malang, Sutiaji. The train depot at Malang station were gradually moved to Malang Kotalama station.

The new building was opened on 10 May 2021, and only serves inter-city train departures and arrivals. Local commuter train services are served by the old building on the west side. This concept has already implemented on Surabaya Gubeng and Bandung stations.

== Building and layout ==
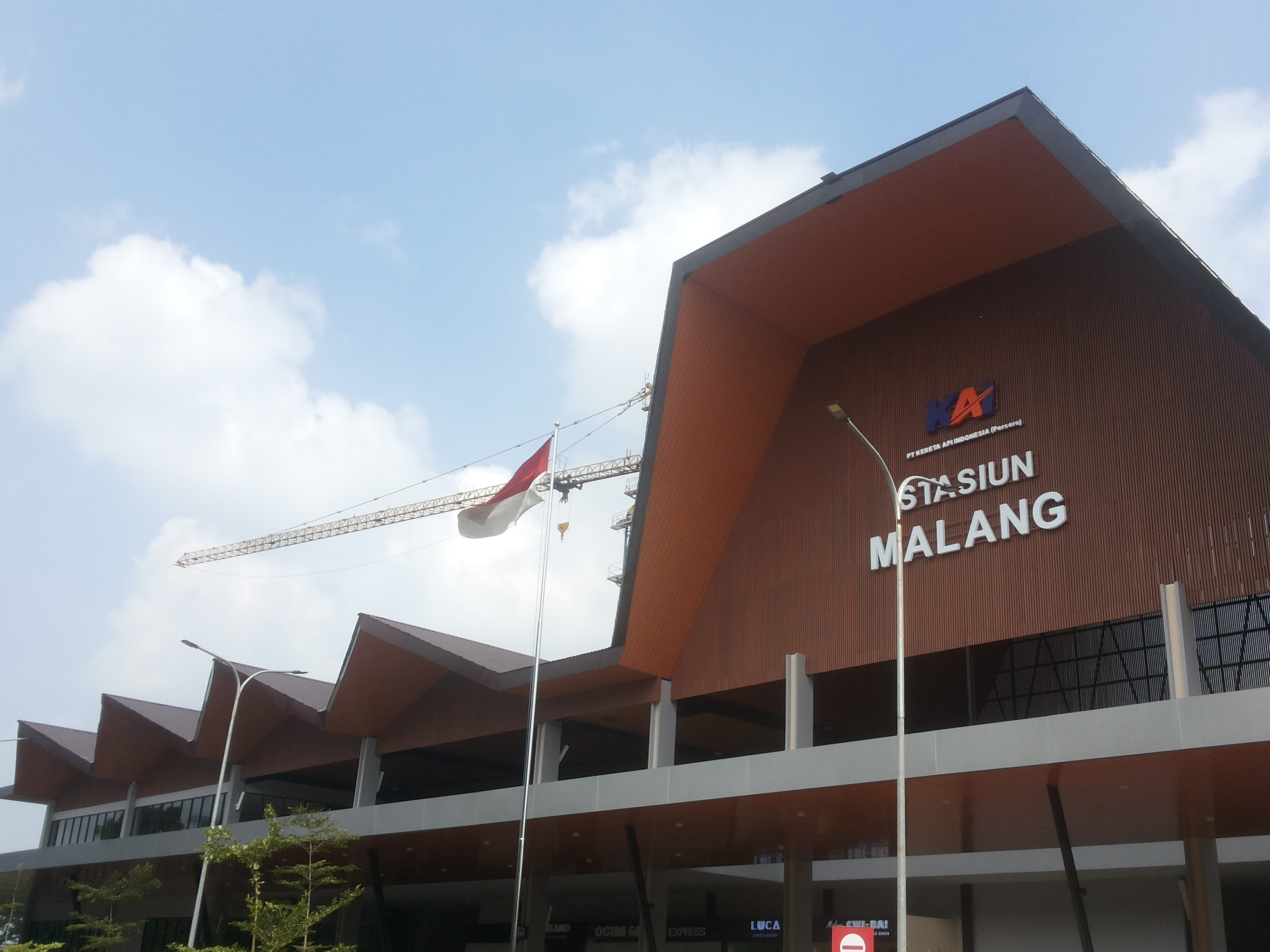
The roof shape of the new building is inspired by Mount Putri Tidur

Malang station has a pedestrian tunnel to connect each platforms. The tunnel was accidentally built as a protection bunker with strong steel doors to avoid bomb strikes during a war.

The new building of Malang station is designed larger than the old one, with capacity up to approximately 2500 passenger. It also have a passenger alightment zone which is not available on the old building. The building's zig-zag roof is designed for maximum air flows, and it is also inspired by Mount Putri Tidur, a mountain located between Malang Regency and Batu City.

For the track layout, Malang station has nine tracks, where line 3 is a straight track. Only lines 1-5 are used for passenger boarding and alighting, and the station is using Siemens mechanical signaling system.

== Services ==
The railway services that are used in this station are:

=== Intercity services ===
- Gajayana to Gambir (executive class)
- Brawijaya to Gambir (executive class)
- Malabar to Bandung (executive and economy class)
- Kertanegara to Purwokerto (executive and economy class)
- Malioboro Express to Yogyakarta (executive and economy class)
- Majapahit to Pasar Senen (economy class)
- Jayabaya to Pasar Senen (executive and economy class)
- Matarmaja to Pasar Senen (economy class)
- Tawang Alun to Ketapang (economy class)
- Ijen Express to Ketapang

=== Local commuter services ===
- Penataran to Surabaya Kota and Blitar (economy class)
- Tumapel to Surabaya Gubeng (economy class)

Preceding station	Kereta Api Indonesia	Following station
Malang Kotalama towards Kertosono	Kertosono–Bangil	Blimbing towards Bangil
