= Gajayana (train) =

Passenger train service in Indonesia

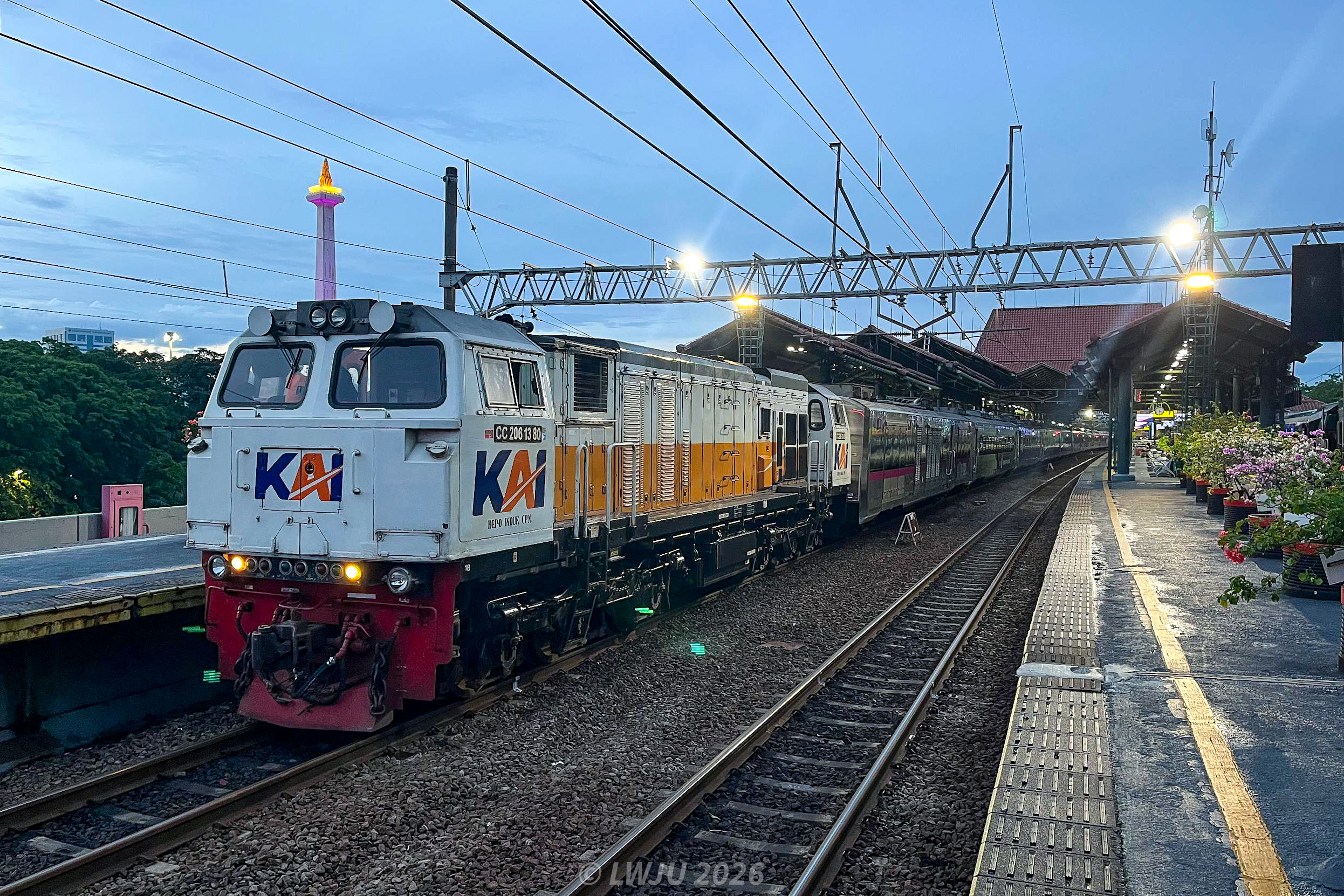
- 36 Gajayana train will departure from Gambir with the new generation, 2026

Overview
- Service type: Inter-city rail
- Status: Operational (regular & addition)
- First service: 28 October 1999; 26 years ago
- Current operator: Kereta Api Indonesia

Route
- Termini: Jakarta Gambir; Malang
- Distance travelled: 905 km (562 mil)
- Average journey time: 12 hours 13 minutes
- Service frequency: 1x Daily each way
- Train numbers: 35-36 (regular); 7001-7002 (addition)

On-board services
- Classes: executive & luxury
- Seating arrangements: 50 seats arranged 2-2 (executive class); 26 seats arranged 1-2 (luxury); The seats can be rotated and reclined up to 140°
- Catering facilities: On-board cafe and trolley service

Technical
- Rolling stock: CC206
- Track gauge: 1.067 mm
- Operating speed: 80 km/h (50 mph) to 120 km/h (75 mph)
Route map

Gajayana train is a train operated by Kereta Api Indonesia in Java, serving between Jakarta Gambir and Malang (via Purwokerto and Yogyakarta).

The train is a mixed passenger train, offering 2 classes – executive and luxury. It offers 1x (daily each way evening schedule) around 905 km (562 mi) in 12 hours 13 minutes for trip from Jakarta to Malang.

== Origin ==
The name of Gajayana comes from the name taken from the title of the king of the Kanjuruhan Kingdom named Sang Liswa who ruled around 760–789. The king was famous among the Brahmin and the people for being able to bring peace throughout the country. The center of the Kanjuruhan Kingdom was in the Dinoyo-Lowokwaru area, Malang City, East Java.

== History ==
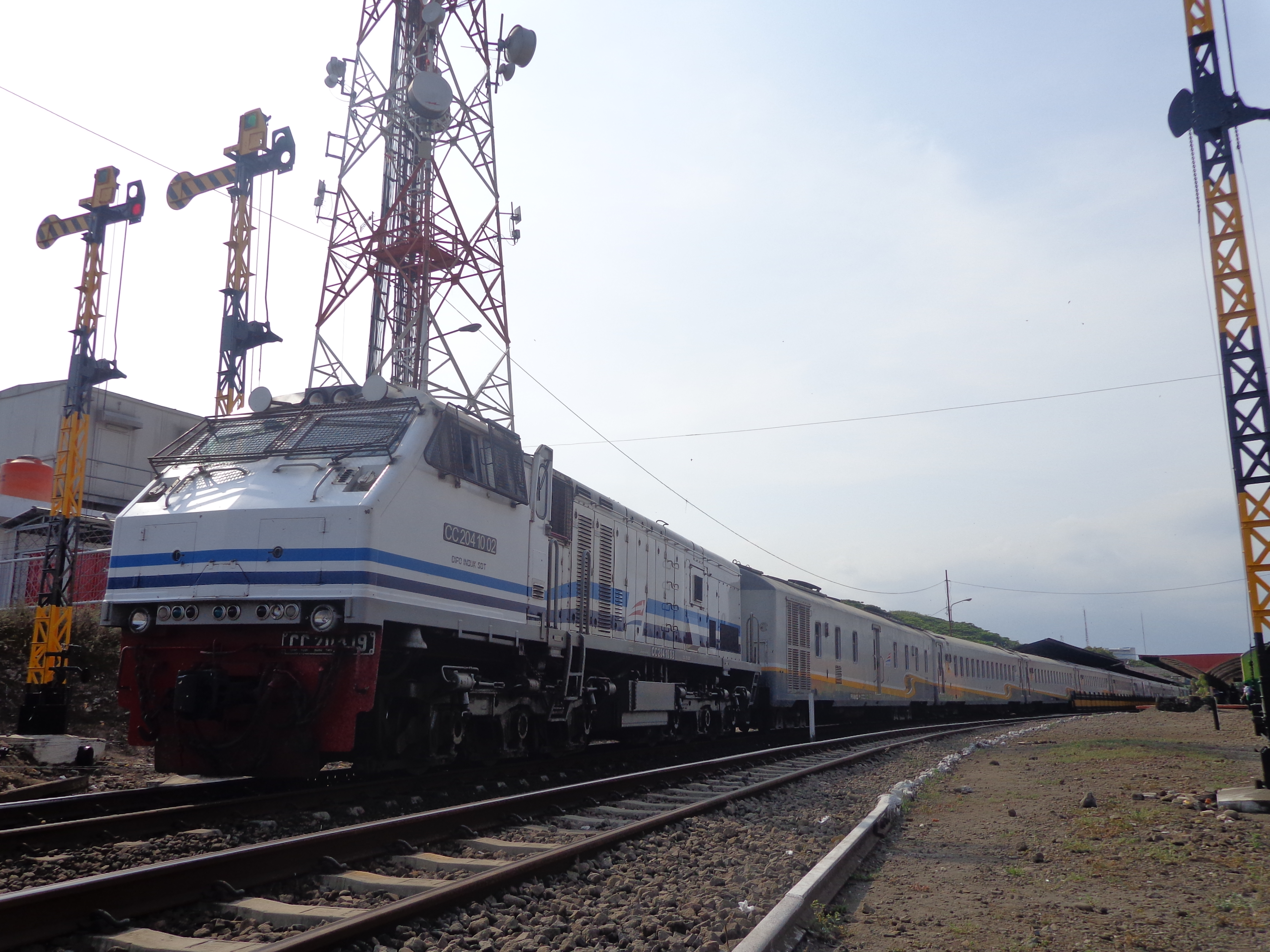
Gajayana train operated with the train car produced in 2009, September 2013

The Gajayana train first operated on 28 October 1999, with two service classes: executive and business. The business-class trains used at the time were a surplus of the Turangga sets the Turangga train received new trainsets from PT INKA, allowing it to serve both business and executive classes in the same year.

Since October 2008, the Gajayana train had operated using executive train sets that were the result of refurbishment from PT INKA, before using train sets produced in 2009—the refurbished train sets were used for the operation of the Bangunkarta train.

Currently, the Gajayana train operates using executive class stainless steel train sets manufactured in 2018 and 2019, while the old train sets (made in 2009 and 2016/2017) are transferred to other train depots, such as Solo Balapan (SLO) and Purwokerto (PWT), and City of Jakarta (JAKK), except for the power train and dining car. Since 26 May 2019, Gajayana trains have served the luxury class.

== Train sets ==
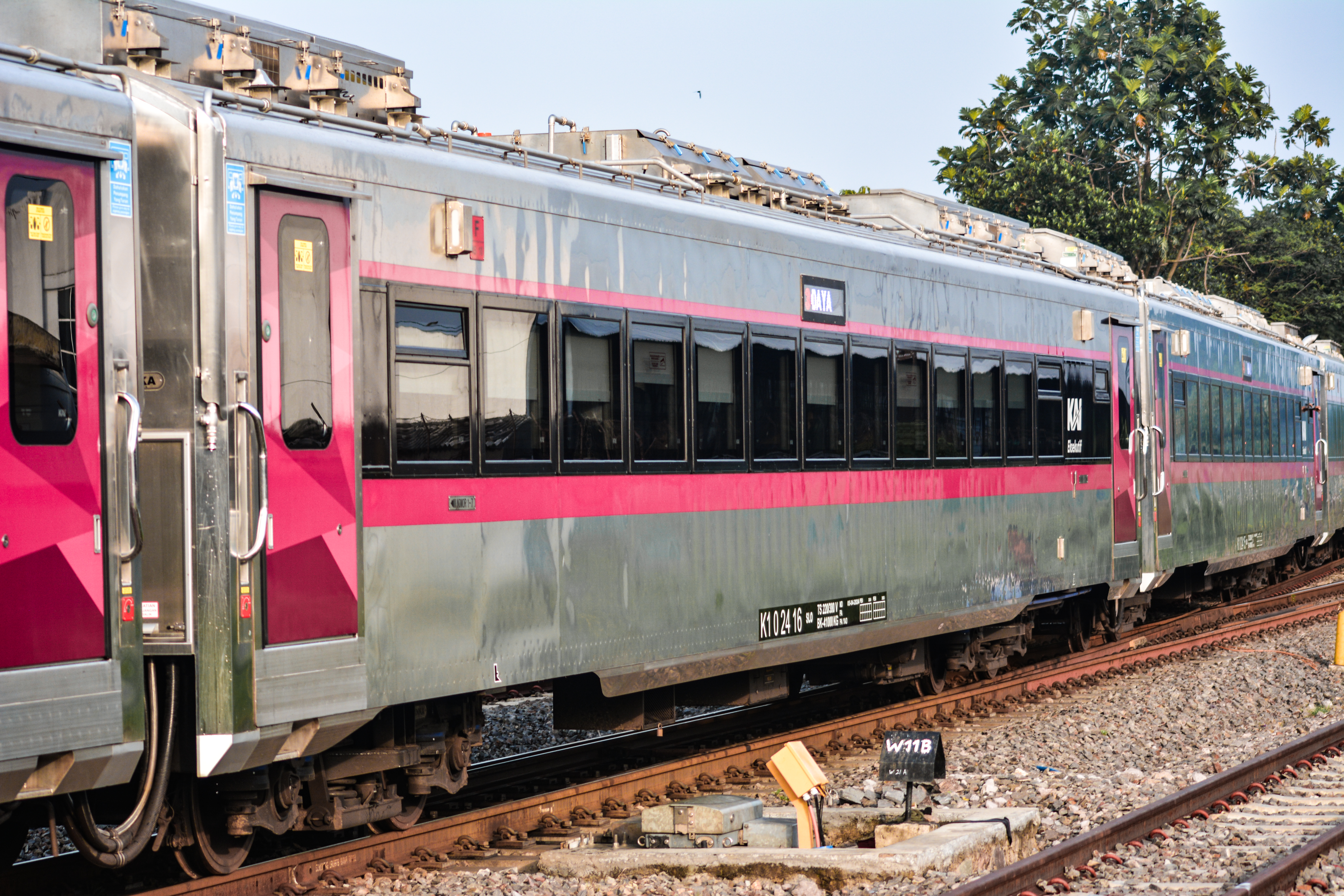
Executive car passenger train new generation of the Gajayana train since January 2026

The Gajayana train carries executive and luxury class passenger cars. The executive class trains are made by PT INKA with a 2-2 seat formation that can accommodate 50 passengers per car. The seats in this class are made of leather upholstery that can be reclined and rotated according to the direction of the train's travel.

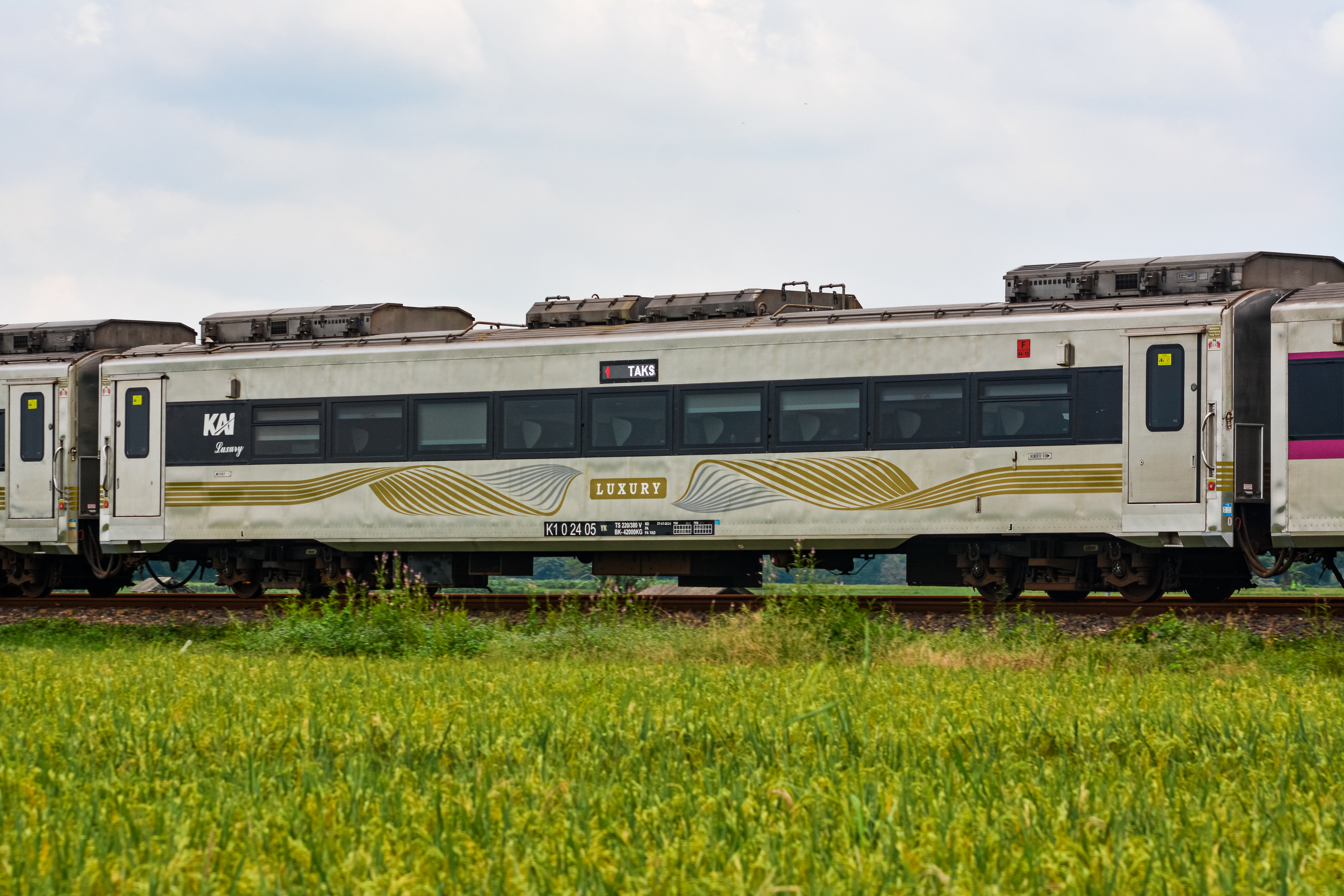
Luxury passenger train new generation or 3rd generation of the Gajayana train since January 2026

In the luxury class, the Gajayana trains use second-generation luxury cars. This class has a capacity of 26 passengers in a 2-to-1 formation. The seats can be adjusted to follow the train's direction of travel and can recline up to 140 degrees. Unlike executive class, the luxury class used on the Gajayana train has footrests and televisions on each seat.

O 1 June 2023 following the enactment of new train travel chart 2023, The Gajayana train operates trains operated by the Malang Main Depot. Each train has a capacity of 426 seats, consisting of eight new executive cars and one second-generation luxury car, not including seats in the dining car.

Beginning on 19 December 2023, the Gajayana train already using a series of stainless steel executive trains which are legacy from Argo Lawu and Argo Dwipangga, which now the Argo Lawu and Argo Dwipangga trains have received the latest generation stainless steel train made by PT INKA Madiun in 2023, while this former train set will be transferred to the Jakarta Kota Train Depot (JAKK) for Pandalungan.

Upon arrival in Jakarta, the Gajayana train set will be used for the Parahyangan which service with the Jakarta Gambir–Bandung relationship and vice versa. Since 10 January 2026, the Gajayana and Parahyangan train uses the newest stainless steel new generation executive trains.

== List of the station ==
On 1 February 2025 following the enactment of new train travel chart 2025, the Gajayana wasn't available for luxury class due replaced by the other train.

- Jakarta Gambir (Start/End)
- Jatinegara (Only from Malang)
- Bekasi
- Cirebon
- Purwokerto
- Kroya
- Kebumen
- Kutoarjo
- Yogyakarta
- Solo Balapan
- Madiun
- Nganjuk
- Kertosono
- Kediri
- Tulungagung
- Blitar
- Kepanjen
- Malang Kota Lama (Only from Gambir)
- Malang (Start/End)

== Accidents ==
- On 27 August 2011, the Gajayana train with driver Yodian Wiliarso and assistant driver Bambang Suradi was hijacked by three people who entered the locomotive driver's cabin. A total of three hijackers entered the locomotive and directed the train to Pasar Senen. Initially, the train was held up at the entry signal at Jatibarang, then at Telagasari several people blocked the train and one person entered the locomotive. The train stopped at Haurgeulis to drop off stowaway passengers in the locomotive. Then the driver informed the Cirebon control center (PK) to give a green aspect signal and continued without stopping along the rail line to Gambir. During the hijacking, the driver lost contact. The driver then informed the new PK at 09.08 that the driver was being held hostage and asked that PK direct the train directly to Gambir. The Gajayana train tried to stop at Jatinegara Station but failed and was directed to Pasar Senen Station. At 09.35 local time, the Gajayana train entered track 4, stopped with emergency brakes by a technician, then was blocked by Brimob officers who were on guard at the edge of the platform.
- On 24 July 2013, the Gajayana 56 train heading to Malang collided with a trailer truck loaded with bagasse at an unguarded crossing located in the Baron Station–Kertosono Station section in Baron Nganjuk, East Java. As a result, both lines were blocked, especially on the southern and central lines of Java Island of the Madiun–Surabaya corridor. The locomotive was severely damaged after the incident. There were no fatalities in this incident, but the train was delayed by about 2 hours at Kertosono.

== See also ==
- Malabar
- Turangga
- Parahyangan
- Kereta Api Indonesia
