= Kebasen railway tunnel =

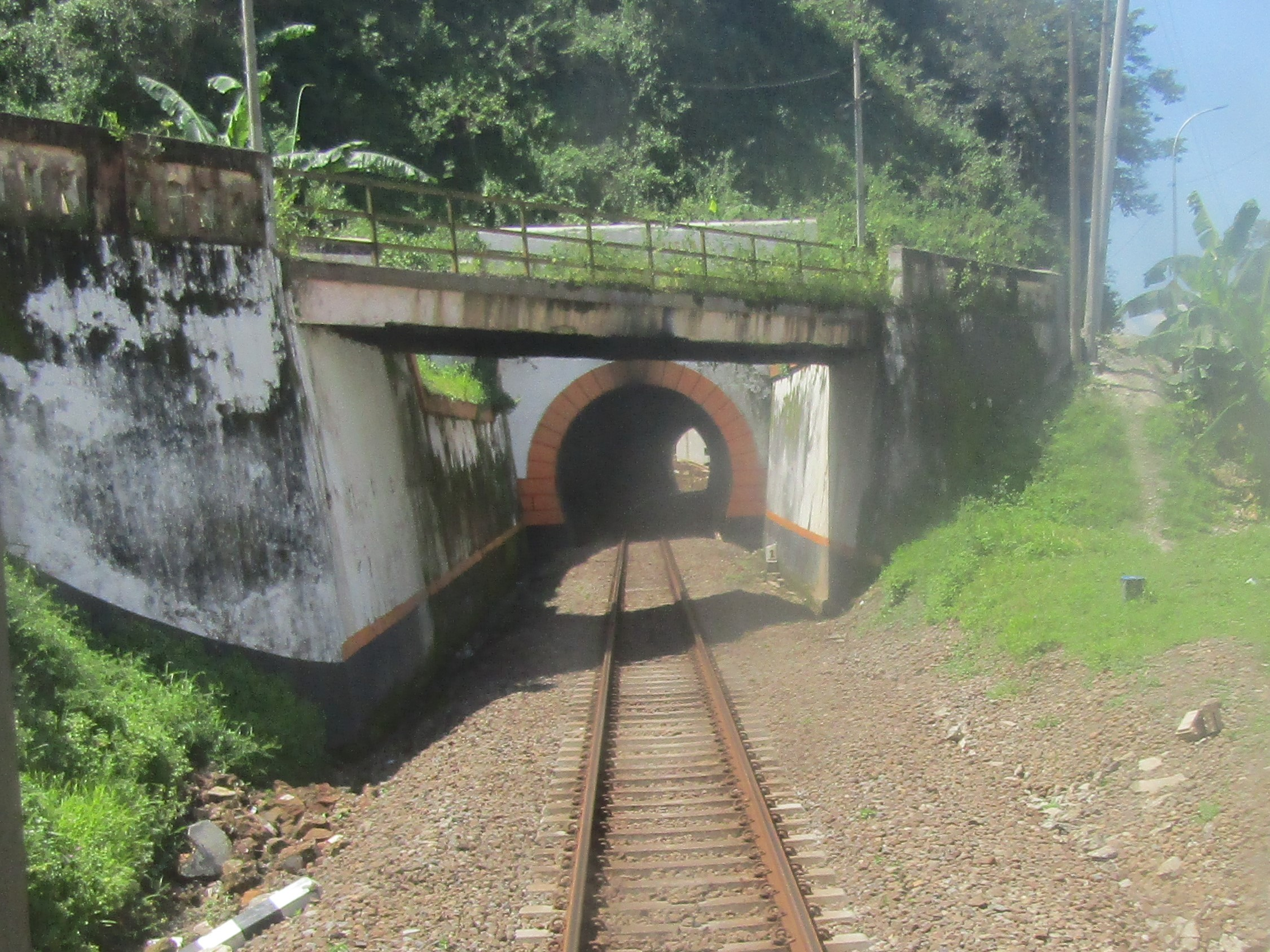
- Old Kebasen railway tunnel in 2019
- Interactive map of Kebasen railway tunnel

Overview
- Location: Gambarsari, Kebasen, Banyumas Regency, Central Java
- Status: active
- Route: Purwokerto - Kroya
- Crosses: Purwokerto-Kroya railway line
- Start: km 363+217 (old)
- End: km 363+296 (old)
- No. of stations: Kebasen

Operation
- Work began: 1916 (old); 2019 (new)
- Constructed: 1915 (old); 2016-2018 (new)
- Opens: 1886 (old railway tunnel), 2020 (new railway tunnel)
- Closed: 2019 (old railway tunnel)
- Owner: Kereta Api Indonesia

Technical
- Length: 109 m (358 ft) (new, BH 1464A); 183 m (600 ft) (new, BH 1464B); 79 m (259 ft) (old)
- Track gauge: 1067 mm

Kebasen railway tunnel is a railway tunnel located by North of Kebasen, in the Gambarsari, Kebasen, Banyumas Regency area.

There are two railway tunnels: the old single-track railway tunnel and the new double-track railway tunnel. Both have building number wisdom (BH) 1464. The new railway tunnel consists of two sections.

== History ==
=== Kebasen single-track railway tunnel (1915-2018) ===
The Prupuk–Kroya railway line was a new railway development package undertaken by the Staatsspoorwegen. The 1910s marked the beginning of this line's construction, as it was part of a plan to connect the line, which had already reached Cirebon to Kroya. Construction of this line also encountered several obstacles, such as the strong currents of the Serayu River, and the need for bridge and tunnel construction, given that the line traversed mountains with contours no less extreme than those of railway lines in the Greater Bandung area.

The Kebasen railway Tunnel, as indicated by its year, was built in 1915 by the SS, and it is likely that the railway tunnel was completed in just a few months due to its single year. It was only 79 meters long and began operations on 1 July 1916, coinciding with the opening of the Patuguran–Kroya segment.

=== Kebasen double-track railway tunnel (2019-Present) ===
The planned construction of a double track between Purwokerto and Kroya is part of the Cirebon-Kroya double track project, which will eventually connect to the central Java double track. The new Kebasen railway tunnel is located next to the old one and will serve two tracks simultaneously. The tunnel was built by the Directorate General of Railways in collaboration with state-owned contractors. Indra Karya served as the supervising consultant and Adhi Karya as the implementing contractor.

This railway tunnel tt consists of two separate sections. Kebasen Baru (New Kebasen) railway tunnel I is 109 meters long, while railway tunnel II is 183 meters long.

It is hoped that with this new railway tunnel, train speed can be increased to approach the maximum speed of Indonesian trains, 120 km/h (75 mph).

Following the completion of the "switch-over" process on the Purwokerto-Kroya route, the old Kebasen and Notog Tunnels were closed on 15 February 2019, and designated as a cultural heritage site. The old tunnel was then closed with a barred gate.

== Service ==
Here's train that entering the Kebasen railway tunnel:

=== Passenger ===
==== Inter-city ====
Southern Java line
Train name	Route
Executive
Purwojaya	Gambir–Cilacap
Taksaka	Gambir–Yogyakarta
Argo Lawu	Gambir–Solo Balapan
Argo Dwipangga	Gambir–Solo Balapan
Manahan	Gambir–Solo Balapan
Argo Semeru	Gambir–Surabaya Gubeng
Bima	Gambir–Surabaya Gubeng
Gajayana	Gambir–Malang
Executive-Business
Baturraden Express (ceased)	Bandung–Purwokerto
Executive-Premium Economy
Sawunggalih	Pasar Senen–Kutoarjo
Fajar and Senja Utama Yogya	Pasar Senen–Yogyakarta
Gajahwong	Pasar Senen–Lempuyangan
Madiun Jaya	Pasar Senen–Madiun
Executive-Economy
Bogowonto	Pasar Senen–Lempuyangan
Kertanegara	Purwokerto–Malang
Malioboro Express	Purwokerto–Malang
Fajar and Senja Utama Solo	Pasar Senen–Solo Balapan
Mataram	Pasar Senen–Solo Balapan
Batavia	Gambir–Solo Balapan
Bangunkarta	Pasar Senen–Jombang
Ranggajati	Cirebon–Surabaya Gubeng–Jember
Gaya Baru Malam Selatan	Pasar Senen–Surabaya Gubeng
Singasari	Pasar Senen–Blitar
Premium Economy
Logawa	Purwokerto–Surabaya Gubeng–Banyuwangi
Jayakarta	Pasar Senen–Surabaya Gubeng
Economy
Serayu	Pasar Senen–Kiaracondong–Purwokerto
Kutojaya Utara	Pasar Senen–Kutoarjo
Progo	Pasar Senen–Lempuyangan
Bengawan	Pasar Senen–Purwosari
Jaka Tingkir	Pasar Senen–Solo Balapan

Northern Java line
Train Name	Route
Executive-Economy
Sancaka Utara	Cilacap–Yogyakarta–Surabaya Pasarturi

=== Freight ===
Train name	Route	
Southern Java line
Cement Cargo Solusi Bangun Indonesia	Karangtalun	Lempuyangan
Cement Cargo Solusi Bangun Indonesia	Karangtalun	Solo Balapan
Cement Cargo Solusi Bangun Indonesia	Karangtalun	Brambanan
Cement Cargo Solusi Bangun Indonesia	Karangtalun	Cirebon Prujakan
Avtur Pertamina cargo	Cilacap	Rewulu
Angkutan pupuk Pupuk Indonesia	Cilacap	Ceper
Angkutan pupuk Pupuk Indonesia	Cilacap	Prupuk
Overnight train service Middle Parcel	Kampung Bandan	Malang
BBM Pertamina Cargo
BBM Pertamina Cargo	Maos	Tegal

== See also ==
- Cirebon Prujakan–Kroya railway
