= Notog railway tunnel =

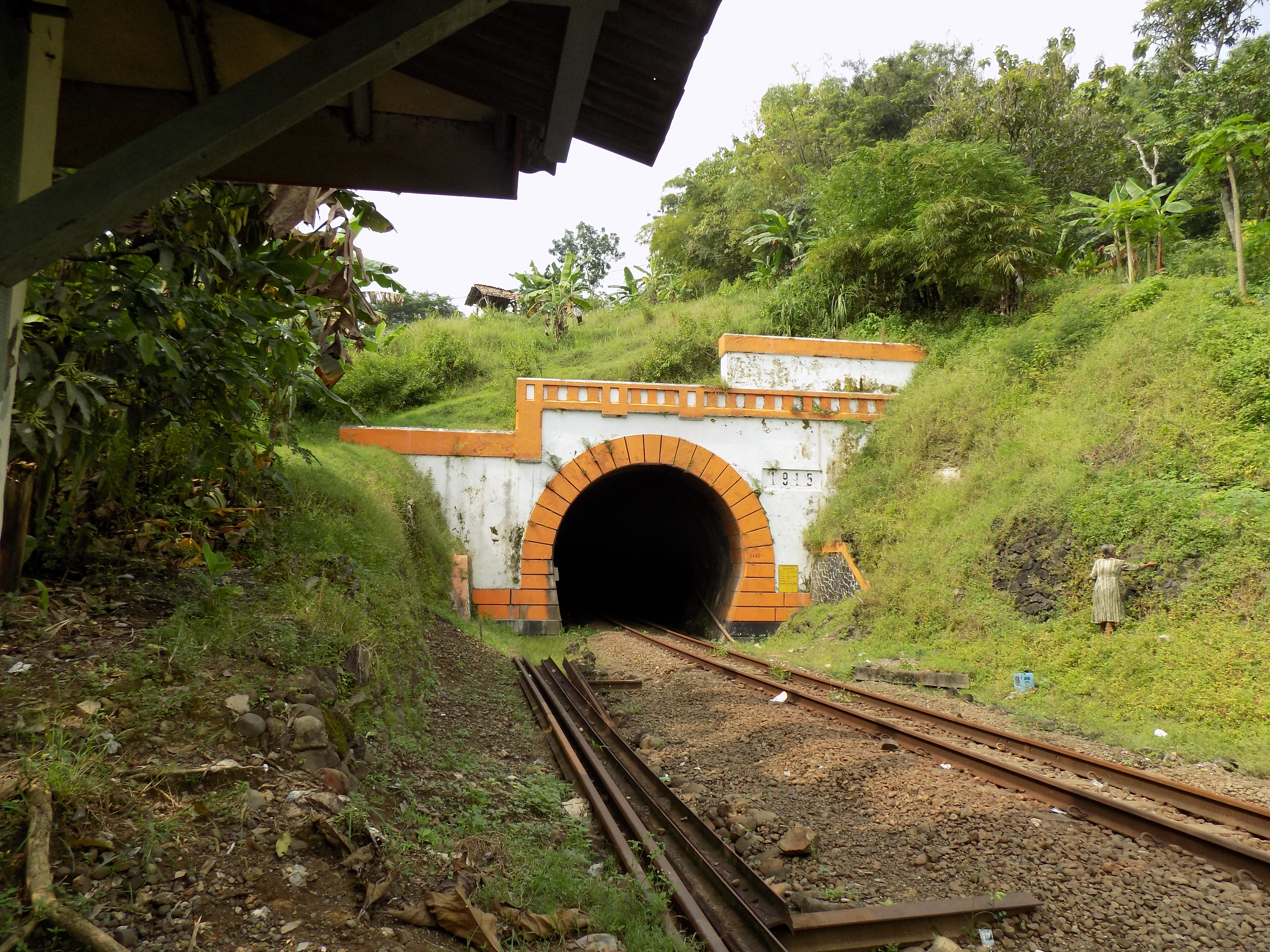
- Old Notog railway tunnel after closed in 2019
- Interactive map of Notog railway tunnel

Overview
- Location: Notog, Patikraja, Banyumas Regency, Central Java
- Status: active
- Route: Purwokerto - Kroya
- Crosses: Purwokerto-Kroya railway line
- Start: km 363+217 (old)
- End: km 363+296 (old)
- No. of stations: Notog

Operation
- Work began: 1916 (old); 2019 (new)
- Constructed: 1915 (old); 2016-2018 (new)
- Opens: 1916 (old railway tunnel), 2019 (new railway tunnel)
- Closed: 2019 (old railway tunnel)
- Owner: Kereta Api Indonesia

Technical
- Length: 476 m (1,562 ft) (new); 285 m (935 ft) (old)
- Track gauge: 1067 mm

Notog railway tunnel is a railway tunnel that located by the south of Notog, located in Notog, Patikraja, Banyumas Regency, Central Java.

There are two railway tunnels: the old, single-track railway tunnel and the new, double-track railway tunnel. Both have building number wisdom (BH) 1440.

== History ==
=== Notog single-track railway tunnel (1915-2018) ===
The construction of the Prupuk–Kroya railway line was a new railway line development package undertaken by the Staatsspoorwegen. The 1910s marked the beginning of the construction of this line, as it was part of a plan to connect the line that had reached Cirebon Prujakan to Kroya at that time. The construction of this line also encountered several obstacles, such as the strong current of the Serayu River and the need for the construction of railway bridges and tunnels, considering that the line was a mountainous route with contours no less extreme than the railway lines in the Greater Bandung area.

The Notog railway tunnel, as indicated by its year, was built in 1915 by the SS, and its single year likely indicates that the tunnel was completed in just a few months. It is 260 meters long and began operations on 1 July 1916, coinciding with the opening of the Patuguran–Kroya section.

=== Notog double-track railway tunnel (2019-Present) ===
The planned construction of a double-track line between Purwokerto and Kroya is part of the Cirebon Prujakan-Kroya double-track line, which will eventually connect to the Central Java double-track line. The tunnel is located next to the existing one and will accommodate two tracks simultaneously. It'll be 476 meters long, was built by the DJKA in collaboration with state-owned enterprise contractors. The state-owned enterprises involved in this project are Indra Karya as the supervising consultant and PT PP as the implementing contractor.

It is hoped that with this new tunnel, train speeds can be increased to approach the maximum speed of Indonesian trains, 120 km/h (75 mph).

After the "switch-over" process on the Purwokerto-Kroya route was completed, the old Notog and Kebasen railway tunnels were officially closed on 15 February 2019 and designated as cultural heritage sites.

== Service ==
Here's train that entering the Notog railway tunnel:

=== Passenger ===
==== Inter-city ====
Southern Java line
Train name	Route
Executive
Purwojaya	Gambir–Cilacap
Taksaka	Gambir–Yogyakarta
Argo Lawu	Gambir–Solo Balapan
Argo Dwipangga	Gambir–Solo Balapan
Manahan	Gambir–Solo Balapan
Argo Semeru	Gambir–Surabaya Gubeng
Bima	Gambir–Surabaya Gubeng
Gajayana	Gambir–Malang
Executive-Business
Baturraden Express (ceased)	Bandung–Purwokerto
Executive-Premium Economy
Sawunggalih	Pasar Senen–Kutoarjo
Fajar and Senja Utama Yogya	Pasar Senen–Yogyakarta
Gajahwong	Pasar Senen–Lempuyangan
Madiun Jaya	Pasar Senen–Madiun
Executive-Economy
Bogowonto	Pasar Senen–Lempuyangan
Kertanegara	Purwokerto–Malang
Malioboro Express	Purwokerto–Malang
Fajar and Senja Utama Solo	Pasar Senen–Solo Balapan
Mataram	Pasar Senen–Solo Balapan
Batavia	Gambir–Solo Balapan
Bangunkarta	Pasar Senen–Jombang
Ranggajati	Cirebon–Surabaya Gubeng–Jember
Gaya Baru Malam Selatan	Pasar Senen–Surabaya Gubeng
Singasari	Pasar Senen–Blitar
Premium Economy
Logawa	Purwokerto–Surabaya Gubeng–Banyuwangi
Jayakarta	Pasar Senen–Surabaya Gubeng
Economy
Serayu	Pasar Senen–Kiaracondong–Purwokerto
Kutojaya Utara	Pasar Senen–Kutoarjo
Progo	Pasar Senen–Lempuyangan
Bengawan	Pasar Senen–Purwosari
Jaka Tingkir	Pasar Senen–Solo Balapan

Northern Java line
Train Name	Route
Executive-Economy
Sancaka Utara	Cilacap–Yogyakarta–Surabaya Pasarturi

=== Freight ===
Train name	Route	
Southern Java line
Cement Cargo Solusi Bangun Indonesia	Karangtalun	Lempuyangan
Cement Cargo Solusi Bangun Indonesia	Karangtalun	Solo Balapan
Cement Cargo Solusi Bangun Indonesia	Karangtalun	Brambanan
Cement Cargo Solusi Bangun Indonesia	Karangtalun	Cirebon Prujakan
Avtur Pertamina cargo	Cilacap	Rewulu
Angkutan pupuk Pupuk Indonesia	Cilacap	Ceper
Angkutan pupuk Pupuk Indonesia	Cilacap	Prupuk
Overnight train service Middle Parcel	Kampung Bandan	Malang
BBM Pertamina Cargo
BBM Pertamina Cargo	Maos	Tegal

== See also ==
- Cirebon Prujakan–Kroya railway
