= Sakalibel railway bridge =

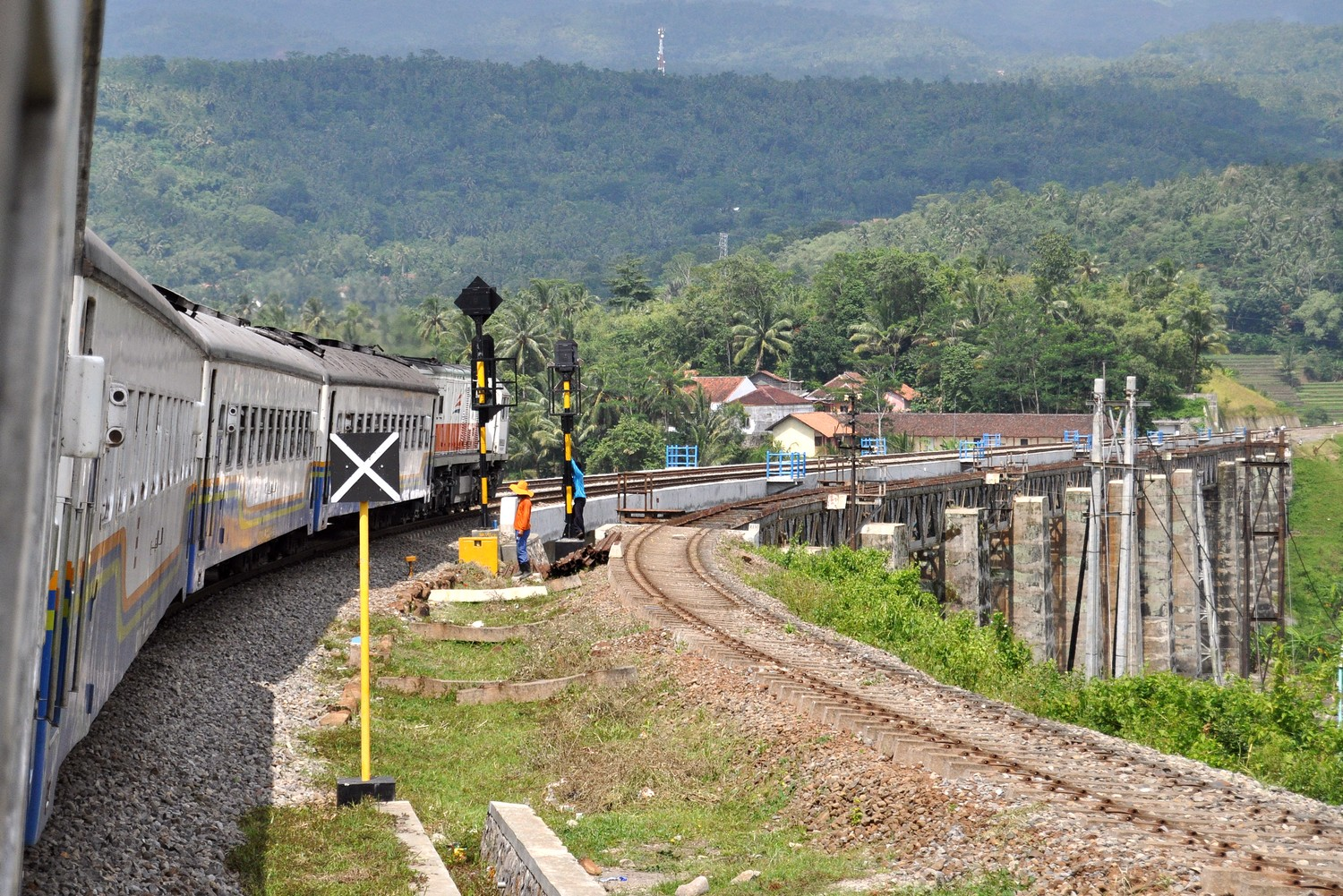
- Train passing the Double track Sakalibel railway bridge, 2012
- Coordinates: 7°14′16″S 109°01′04″E
- Crosses: Cirebon Prujakan–Kroya railway line
- Locale: km 313+434, Bumiayu, Brebes Regency, Central Java
- Begins: Bumiayu
- Ends: Linggapura

Characteristics
- Total length: 298 meters

Rail characteristics
- Track gauge: 1067 mm

History
- Built: 1917
- Opened: 1921
- Rebuilt: 1972

Location
- Interactive map of Sakalibel railway bridge

Sakalibel railway bridge is a railway bridge over the Keruh river, located in Bumiayu, Brebes Regency, Central Java. The bridge was originally named Kali Keruh railway bridge, and is the longest railway bridge in Operation Area V Purwokerto. It has the building wisdom number 1153, and is located about one kilometer from the east of Bumiayu on the central line of Java. With a length of about 298m and a backdrop of mountainous scenery, Sakalimolas is popular as a photo spot, especially for train lovers (railfan).

== History ==
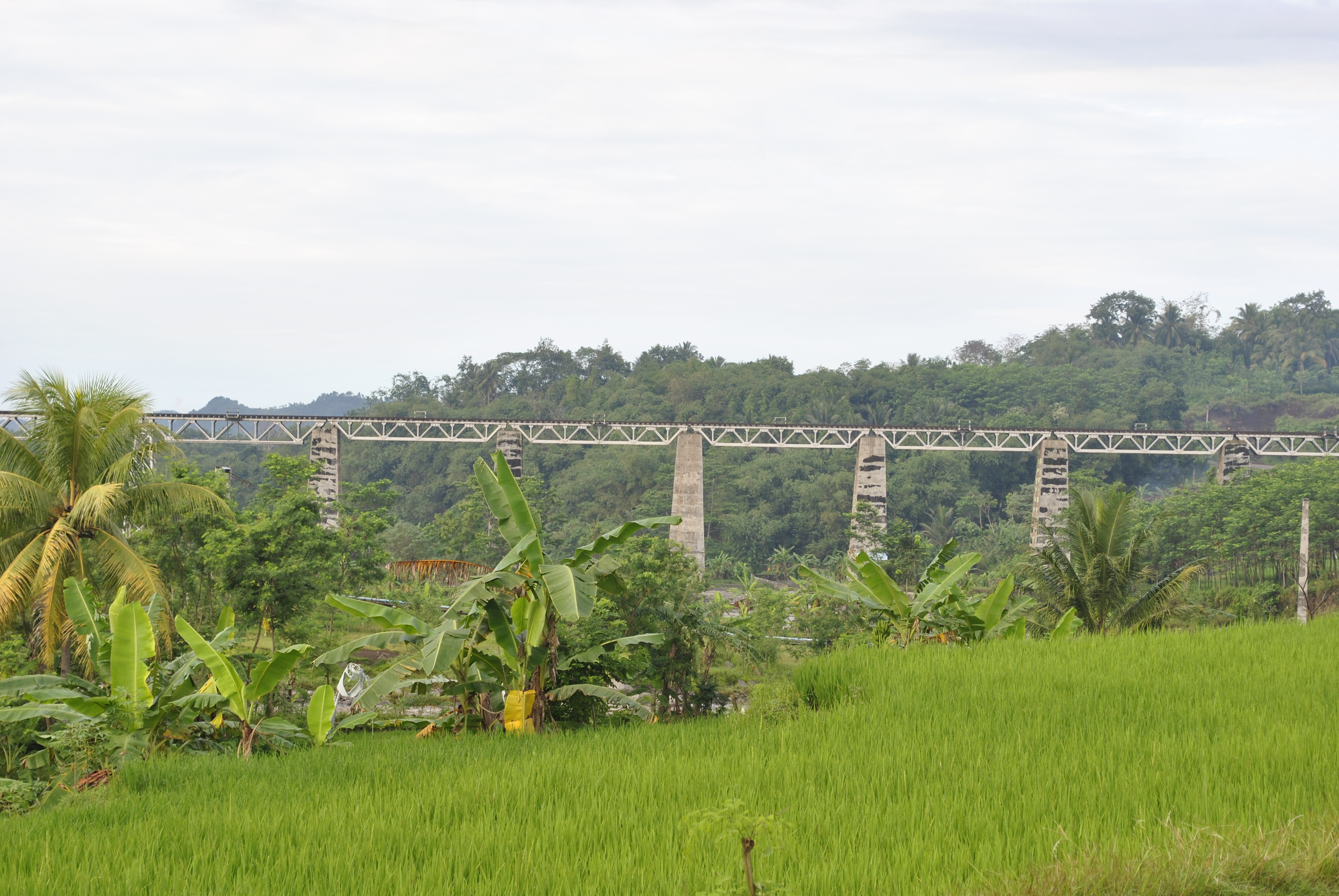
Sakalibel railway bridge viewed with the paddy field, 2010

On 18 March 1972, One of the pillars of the Sakalibel railway bridge collapsed due to the strong current and overflow of the Keruh River. At that time, a train was about to cross the collapsed bridge. Fortunately, the train was stopped by residents of Adisana Village who alerted the driver about the collapsed bridge. For the residents' efforts, the Government of the Republic of Indonesia gave appreciation to 6 representatives of the Adisana Village residents on 28 March 1972 by giving them a certificate of appreciation and 30,000 rupiah in cash. In addition, they also received a gift from the National Railway Company (PNKA) in the form of free train tickets to all routes and a gift from President Soeharto in the form of 6 buffaloes. And, as a form of gratitude to the residents of Adisana Village, the Government of the Republic of Indonesia established Adisana 1 Primary school which is located not far from the Sakalibel railway bridge.

Meanwhile, the collapsed concrete pillars on the Sakalibel Bridge were replaced with steel pillars. The bridge repair process lasted until July 1972, although the Sakalibel Bridge was ready for trains to cross in June 1972 and was inaugurated on 16 June 1972, by Minister of Transportation Frans Seda along with the inauguration of SDN 1 Adisana.

Along with the construction of a double track railway between Purwokerto and Prupuk, the Sakalibel railway bridge which uses a steel frame was replaced with a new building constructed of concrete and changed its name to Sakanenem. The new concrete bridge also contains two rail tracks, while the old bridge is no longer in use.

== Technical data ==
BH 1153
River name	Keruh
Length	298 m
Build	1917
Strengthened year	1968, 1972, 1997
Construction	Steel with upper traffic frame beams
Location	km 313+434 between Bumiayu - Kretek, Central Java

== Service ==
Here's train that crossing the Sakalibel railway bridge:

=== Passenger ===
==== Inter-city ====
Southern Java line
Train name	Route
Executive
Purwojaya	Gambir–Cilacap
Taksaka	Gambir–Yogyakarta
Argo Lawu	Gambir–Solo Balapan
Argo Dwipangga	Gambir–Solo Balapan
Manahan	Gambir–Solo Balapan
Argo Semeru	Gambir–Surabaya Gubeng
Bima	Gambir–Surabaya Gubeng
Gajayana	Gambir–Malang
Executive-Premium Economy
Sawunggalih	Pasar Senen–Kutoarjo
Fajar and Senja Utama Yogya	Pasar Senen–Yogyakarta
Gajahwong	Pasar Senen–Lempuyangan
Madiun Jaya	Pasar Senen–Madiun
Executive-Economy
Bogowonto	Pasar Senen–Lempuyangan
Kertanegara	Purwokerto–Malang
Malioboro Express	Purwokerto–Malang
Fajar and Senja Utama Solo	Pasar Senen–Solo Balapan
Mataram	Pasar Senen–Solo Balapan
Batavia	Gambir–Solo Balapan
Bangunkarta	Pasar Senen–Jombang
Ranggajati	Cirebon–Surabaya Gubeng–Jember
Gaya Baru Malam Selatan	Pasar Senen–Surabaya Gubeng
Singasari	Pasar Senen–Blitar
Premium Economy
Jayakarta	Pasar Senen–Surabaya Gubeng
Economy
Kutojaya Utara	Pasar Senen–Kutoarjo
Progo	Pasar Senen–Lempuyangan
Bengawan	Pasar Senen–Purwosari
Jaka Tingkir	Pasar Senen–Solo Balapan

==== Commuter ====
Train name	Class	Route	
Joglosemarkerto	Executive and economy	Solo Balapan	Semarang Tawang (clockwise via Yogyakarta and Purwokerto)
Joglosemarkerto	Executive and economy	Solo Balapan	Solo Balapan (counterclockwise via Tegal and Purwokerto)
Joglosemarkerto	Executive-Premium Economy	Yogyakarta	Cilacap
Kamandaka	Executive-Economy	Semarang Tawang	Cilacap

=== Freight ===
Train name	Route	
Southern Java line
Cement Cargo Solusi Bangun Indonesia	Karangtalun	Lempuyangan
Cement Cargo Solusi Bangun Indonesia	Karangtalun	Solo Balapan
Cement Cargo Solusi Bangun Indonesia	Karangtalun	Brambanan
Cement Cargo Solusi Bangun Indonesia	Karangtalun	Cirebon Prujakan
Avtur Pertamina cargo	Cilacap	Rewulu
Angkutan pupuk Pupuk Indonesia	Cilacap	Ceper
Angkutan pupuk Pupuk Indonesia	Cilacap	Prupuk
Overnight train service Middle Parcel	Kampung Bandan	Malang
BBM Pertamina Cargo
BBM Pertamina Cargo	Maos	Tegal
Northern Java Line

== See also ==
- Cirebon Prujakan–Kroya railway
