= Kebasen railway station =

Railway station in Indonesia

Kebasen Station Stasiun Kebasen
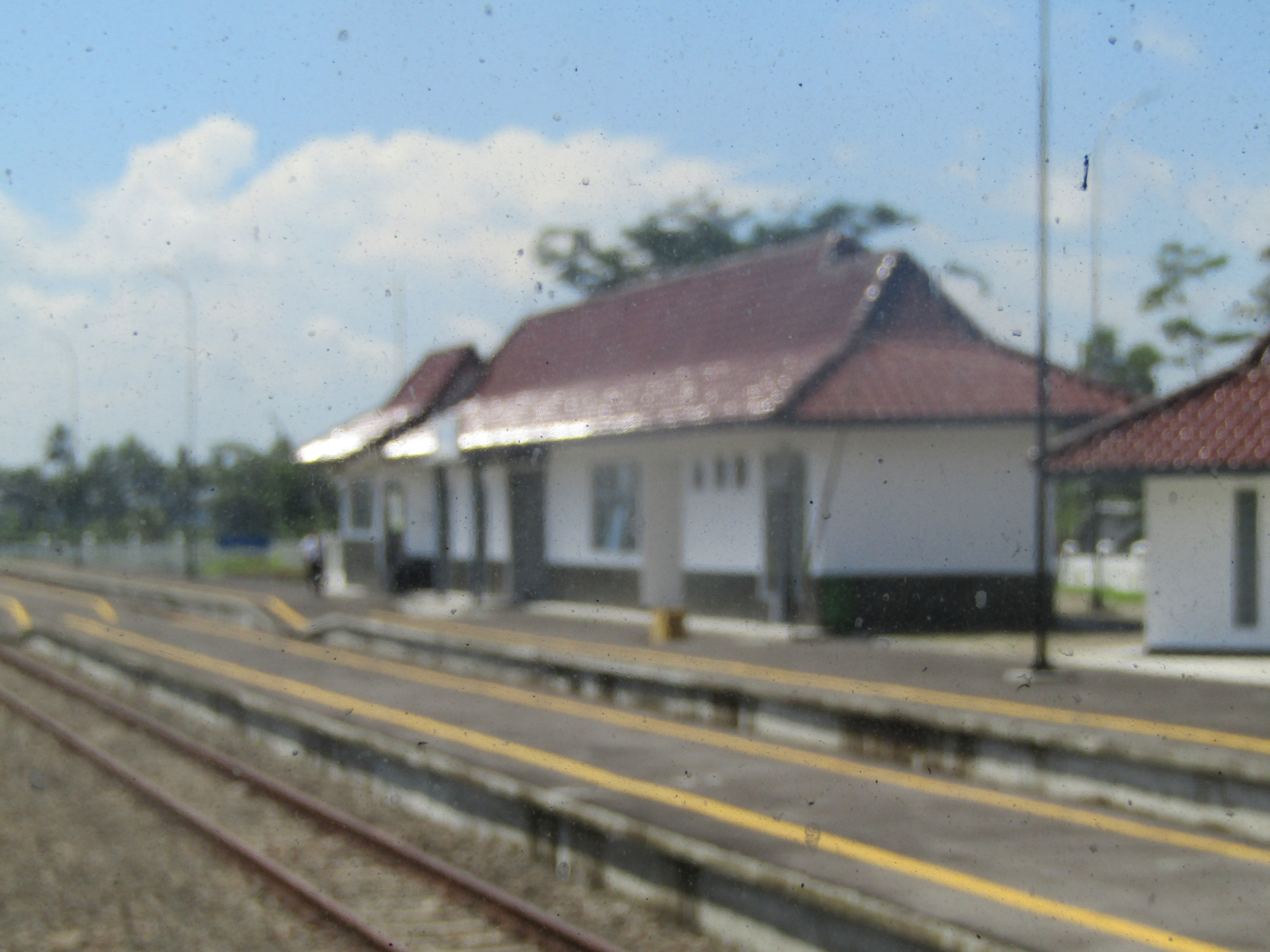
- The newly built building as of 2019

General information
- Location: Jl. Stasiun Kebasen, Gambarsari, Kebasen, Banyumas Regency; Central Java; Indonesia
- Coordinates: 7.532270°S 109.203966°E
- Elevation: +16 m (52 ft)
- Owner: Kereta Api Indonesia
- Operator: Kereta Api Indonesia
- Line: Prupuk–Kroya
- Platforms: 1 side platform 2 Island platforms
- Tracks: 4

Construction
- Structure type: Ground
- Parking: Available
- Accessible: Available

Other information
- Station code: KBS • 2112
- Classification: Class III

History
- Opened: 1 July 1916
Location
- Location within Java

Kebasen Station (KBS) is a class III railway station located in Gambarsari, Kebasen, Banyumas Regency, Central Java, Indonesia.

The station sits at an elevation of +16 m (52 ft) amsl. The station is under the subdivision Operation Area V Purwokerto of PT Kereta Api Indonesia (Persero).

== History ==
The original station building was built in 1915 by Staatsspoorwegen (SS) during the Dutch East Indies colonial era, this coincides with the opening of the Notog tunnel and the Kebasen tunnel in 1916.

Initially the old station building had 3 tracks, with the second track being a straight track. However, with the construction of a double track to Kroya Station, a new station building was built 200 m southeast of the previous one with an additional straight track making it having 2 straight tracks. In addition, the interlocking signal was replaced with new Len-02 electric signal by PT Len Industri while the older one were Westinghouse Westrace.

With the opening of the new double track on 28 January 2019 which includes the new Kebasen tunnel and new Serayu Kebasen bridge, the old track as well as the original Notog and Kebasen tunnel were made redundant and closed soon after, with the railway tracks dismantled. These historic railway structures have since been preserved as heritage sites.

== Services ==
As of 2024, there are two trains that stop in Kebasen Station.

- Serayu, direction to Purwokerto and Pasar Senen
- Bengawan, direction to Purwosari and Pasar Senen

Preceding station	Kereta Api Indonesia	Following station
Notog towards Prupuk	Prupuk–Kroya	Randegan towards Kroya
