= Notog railway station =

Railway station in Indonesia

Notog Station Stasiun Notog
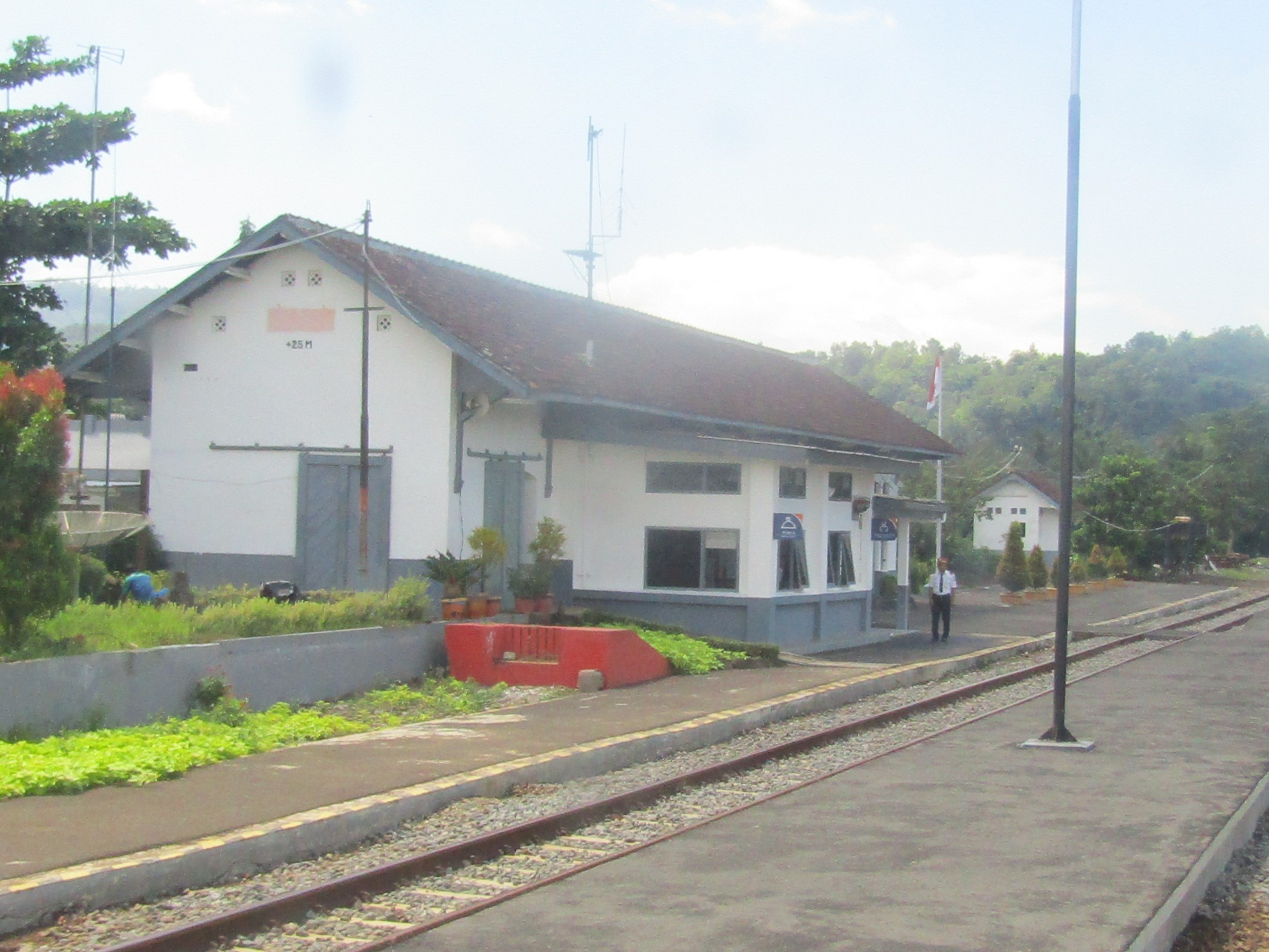
- Main building of Notog Station in 2019

General information
- Location: Notog, Patikraja, Banyumas Regency; Central Java; Indonesia
- Coordinates: 7.4860185°S 109.2133968°E
- Elevation: +25 m (82 ft)
- Owner: Kereta Api Indonesia
- Operator: Kereta Api Indonesia
- Line: Prupuk–Kroya
- Platforms: 1 side platform 1 Island platform
- Tracks: 4

Construction
- Structure type: Ground
- Parking: Available
- Accessible: Available

Other information
- Station code: NTG
- Classification: Class III

History
- Opened: 1 July 1916
Location
- Location within Java

Notog Station (NTG) is a small railway station located in Notog, Patikraja, Banyumas Regency, Central Java, Indonesia.

The station sits at an elevation of +25 m above sea level. The station is under the subdivision DAOP V Purwokerto of PT Kereta Api Indonesia (Persero).

== History ==
Notog Station was built in 1915 by Staatsspoorwegen and opened on 1 July 1916 under the Dutch East Indies.

Initially the station had only three tracks (two passing tracks), however a recent upgrade on the Prupuk–Kroya railway (which included double-track rails) means that the station had an extra track. Trains used to have to stop for other trains to pass, but with the opening of the double track rail in 2019, all trains are no longer required to stop in Notog Station.

== Services ==
As of 2020, there are no trains stopping in Notog Station.

Preceding station	Kereta Api Indonesia	Following station
Purwokerto towards Prupuk	Prupuk–Kroya	Kebasen towards Kroya
