= Cirebon Prujakan–Kroya railway =

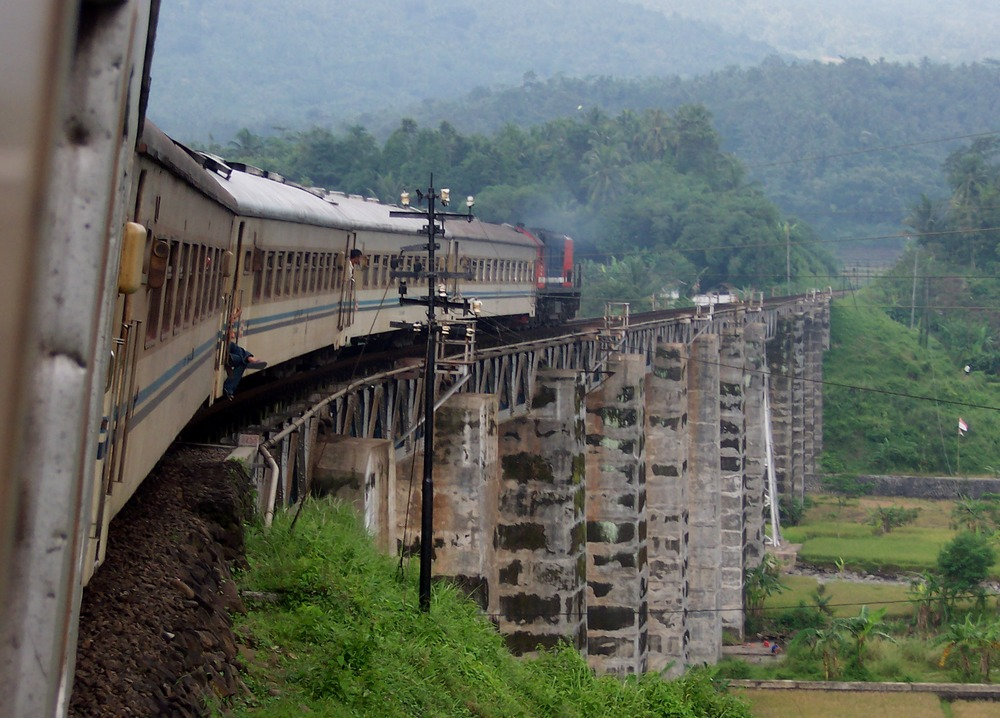
- Sawunggalih Utama passing Sakalibel railway bridge before the double track railway is under construction, 2005

Overview
- Native name: Jalur kereta api Cirebon Prujakan–Kroya
- Status: Operational
- Owner: Directorate General of Railways (DJKA)
- Locale: Cirebon, West Java - Kroya, Central Java
- Termini: Cirebon Prujakan; Kroya
- Stations: 19

Service
- Type: Inter-city rail
- Operator(s): PT Kereta Api Indonesia

History
- Opened: 1916

Technical
- Number of tracks: 2
- Track gauge: 1,067 mm (3 ft 6 in)
- Electrification: not available

Cirebon Prujakan–Kroya railway is an middle railway line that connecting between Cirebon Prujakan and Kroya via Purwokerto that main corridor between Jakarta and Yogyakarta. This railway line have 2 railway tunnels, like the Kebasen railway tunnel & Notog railway tunnel, also have some railway bridge, like the Sakalibel railway bridge and more railway bridge.

This railway line have a characteristic, in Cirebon Prujakan-Kroya segment only passing the mountainous area in west side and Mount Slamet on the right side.

== History ==
=== Began Construction ===
The Staatsspoorwegen (SS) wanted the Batavia–Surabaya connection to be implemented in one day. The construction of the Cirebon Prujakan–Kroya line was stipulated in a law dated 31 December 1912 (Staatsblad 1913 No. 32); although it was heavily criticized by the expert committee regarding how profitable the line would be in the future. On 1 July 1916, the 73 km Cirebon Prujakan–Prupuk (Margasari) section, and the 51 km Kroya–Patuguran section, were completed. On 1 January 1917, the Patuguran–Prupuk link (32 km) was also completed. However, this effort was not successful. Opposition from the Volksraad and cuts to the state capital participation (PMN) budget for the SS meant that service users still had to stay overnight in Yogyakarta before being able to continue to Surabaya.

The Jakarta-Surabaya connection was still interrupted due to the existence of the Semarang-Vorstenlanden railway line, which had the status of a Nederlandsch-Indische Spoorweg Maatschappij (NIS) concession line with standard gauge. Although in 1899 a third rail (double gauge) was installed to allow trains with standard gauge, SS trains had to share the line with NIS trains, with limited capacity. Only in 1925 did SS receive permission to build its own line next to the NIS line, so that SS trains could continue to run on their own lines, with the agreement that the land used would remain under NIS concession. In 1929, this one-day connection was realized with the presence of the Eendaagsche Express.

=== Double track project ===
The double-track railway project was then restarted by the Directorate General of Railways (DJKA) in 2008, when construction of the Purwokerto–Patuguran double-track segment began in May. The project was divided into three phases: Cirebon Prujakan–Prupuk, Prupuk–Purwokerto, and Purwokerto–Kroya. In the first segment, Prupuk–Purwokerto was built first, because the terrain is mountainous and has a higher frequency of passenger train traffic than the other segments. Due to limited state budget funds, only rail construction and some changes to the signaling system were carried out. In addition to building the track, two underpasses were also built in Legok, Karanggandul, and Kebocoran, each with two. The Purwokerto–Patuguran segment begin operation on 9 September 2009, Patuguran–Kretek segment as of 24 March 2011, and completed with full operation of the Kretek–Prupuk segment as of 1 December 2011.

To welcome the second phase, the Cirebon Prujakan emplacement was arranged, so that trains from the south can stop at Prujakan. Tundjung Inderawan, who was then the Director General of Railways, explained the follow-up plan after this project, namely the construction of a double track across southern Java. Financing for the Cirebon-Prupuk double track project uses government sukuk (SBSN) with a contract value of Rp1.6 trillion, of which Rp800 billion has been disbursed to the DJKA, and the remainder will be continued in 2014. Meanwhile, Inderawan also said that the third phase of the project will use a Japanese loan. The Larangan–Prupuk segment start operate on 29 May 2014, Ciledug–Larangan segment as of 16 December 2014, and Cirebon Prujakan–Ciledug as of 1 April 2015.

Third segment is Purwokerto–Kroya, started in December 2015. Vice President of KAI Daop V Purwokerto, Dwi Erni Ratnawati, said that the project was slower compared to the previous project. This was due to the construction of the Serayu Kebasen railway ridge and two new tunnels (Notog and Kebasen). Meanwhile, Suyanto, who was then the manager of Railways and Bridges, the construction of the tunnels was intended to reduce the number of curves so that trains could travel up to 100 kilometres per hour (62 mph). An beginning of the trial double track on 28 January 2019 and the relocation of the route to the new Notog Tunnel and two bridges north of the tunnel as of 15 February 2019, then automatically the old routes, bridges and tunnels are closed and made into cultural heritage sites. Next, as of 5 March 2019, this last segment was connected and officially operational.

On 11 January 2021 at 21.30 local time, The old Kali Glagah railway bridge, a colonial legacy located in the Bumiayu-Linggapura section, collapsed due to flooding. As a result, trains passing through the section were diverted via Bandung and the northern route for several days. The following day, the railway line was declared open for use, but only one track was operational for the time being. There were no fatalities in the incident. This incident caused Linggapura Station to be reactivated for railway crossings. Finally, on 15 April 2023, Bumiayu–Linggapura section returned to the double track after BH 1120 bridge were operated back.

== Service ==
=== Passenger ===
==== Inter-city ====
Southern Java line
Train name	Route
Executive
Purwojaya	Gambir–Cilacap
Taksaka	Gambir–Yogyakarta
Argo Lawu	Gambir–Solo Balapan
Argo Dwipangga	Gambir–Solo Balapan
Manahan	Gambir–Solo Balapan
Argo Semeru	Gambir–Surabaya Gubeng
Bima	Gambir–Surabaya Gubeng
Gajayana	Gambir–Malang
Executive-Business
Baturraden Express (ceased)	Bandung–Purwokerto
Executive-Premium Economy
Sawunggalih	Pasar Senen–Kutoarjo
Fajar and Senja Utama Yogya	Pasar Senen–Yogyakarta
Gajahwong	Pasar Senen–Lempuyangan
Madiun Jaya	Pasar Senen–Madiun
Executive-Economy
Bogowonto	Pasar Senen–Lempuyangan
Kertanegara	Purwokerto–Malang
Malioboro Express	Purwokerto–Malang
Fajar and Senja Utama Solo	Pasar Senen–Solo Balapan
Mataram	Pasar Senen–Solo Balapan
Batavia	Gambir–Solo Balapan
Bangunkarta	Pasar Senen–Jombang
Ranggajati	Cirebon–Surabaya Gubeng–Jember
Gaya Baru Malam Selatan	Pasar Senen–Surabaya Gubeng
Singasari	Pasar Senen–Blitar
Premium Economy
Logawa	Purwokerto–Surabaya Gubeng–Banyuwangi
Jayakarta	Pasar Senen–Surabaya Gubeng
Economy
Serayu	Pasar Senen–Kiaracondong–Purwokerto
Kutojaya Utara	Pasar Senen–Kutoarjo
Progo	Pasar Senen–Lempuyangan
Bengawan	Pasar Senen–Purwosari
Jaka Tingkir	Pasar Senen–Solo Balapan

==== Commuter ====
Train name	Class	Route	
Joglosemarkerto	Executive and economy	Solo Balapan	Semarang Tawang (clockwise via Yogyakarta and Purwokerto)
Joglosemarkerto	Executive and economy	Solo Balapan	Solo Balapan (counterclockwise via Tegal and Purwokerto)
Joglosemarkerto	Executive-Premium Economy	Yogyakarta	Cilacap
Kamandaka	Executive-Economy	Semarang Tawang	Cilacap

=== Freight ===
Train name	Route	
Southern Java line
Cement Cargo Solusi Bangun Indonesia	Karangtalun	Lempuyangan
Cement Cargo Solusi Bangun Indonesia	Karangtalun	Solo Balapan
Cement Cargo Solusi Bangun Indonesia	Karangtalun	Brambanan
Cement Cargo Solusi Bangun Indonesia	Karangtalun	Cirebon Prujakan
Avtur Pertamina cargo	Cilacap	Rewulu
Fertilizer Cargo Pupuk Indonesia	Cilacap	Ceper
Fertilizer Cargo Pupuk Indonesia	Cilacap	Prupuk
Overnight train service Middle Parcel	Kampung Bandan	Malang
BBM Pertamina Cargo
BBM Pertamina Cargo	Maos	Tegal
Northern Java Line

== See also ==
- Cikampek–Cirebon Prujakan railway
- Cilacap–Kroya–Yogyakarta railway
