= Purwojaya =

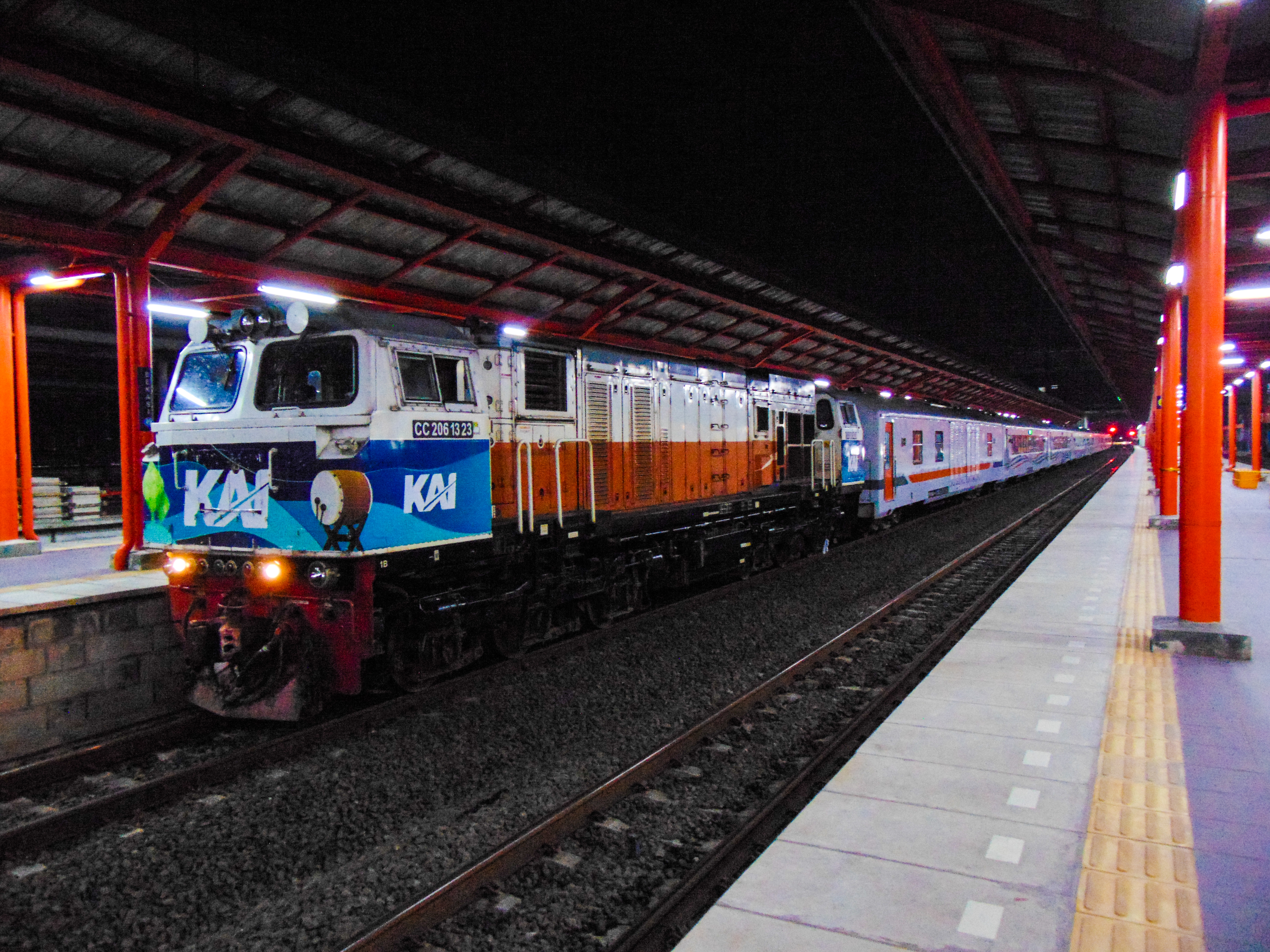
- Purwojaya at Bekasi station

Overview
- Service type: Inter-city rail
- Status: Operational
- Locale: Operational area V Purwokerto
- Current operator: Kereta Api Indonesia

Route
- Termini: Cilacap; Jakarta Gambir
- Stops: Gumilir, Maos, Kroya, Purwokerto, Bumiayu Cirebon, Bekasi, Jatinegara
- Distance travelled: 404 kilometres (251 mi)
- Service frequency: 3x daily each way
- Train number: 49-60

Technical
- Rolling stock: CC206
- Track gauge: 1067 mm
- Operating speed: 80 - 120 km/h (50 - 75 mph)
Route map

Purwojaya is an executive passenger train operated by PT Kereta Api Indonesia for use between Cilacap and Jakarta's Gambir station. It is the only train running the route.

== History ==
The history of the Purwojaya train operation began in 1986. At that time, to accommodate the large occupancy of Sawunggalih, especially passengers from/and Purwokerto, every holiday a Sawunggalih "assistance train" was operated with a shorter route from Pasar Senen to Purwokerto, then during the Christmas and New Year holidays in 1987 this assistance train was extended to Karanganyar with a mixed class, business and economy. The reason for operating the assistance train with this connection was because at that time, 60 to 70% of Sawunggalih and Kutojaya Economy Class passengers were traveling from/to Purwokerto Station, Kroya Station, Gombong Station, and Karanganyar Station. This assistance train was named "Romajaya Train," derived from the former name of Karanganyar, Kebumen, when it was still a duchy.

On March 13, 1995, this train operated with business-class service between Purwokerto Station and Gambir Station, under the name Purwojaya, derived from the abbreviation of this train connection: "Purwokerto" and "Jakarta Ra" and "Jakarta Ra" and "Ja". On May 31, 1996, coinciding with the launch of the Sawunggalih Plus (Gambir-Kutoarjo) business executive train, this train added an Executive class and extended its service to Cilacap Station. However, this service only operated on weekends and holidays. It wasn't until 1997 that the train officially launched executive class service and extended its service to Cilacap Station. In 2012, the train briefly extended its service to Pasar Senen Station, but this was soon reverted to its original service.

Purwojaya again experienced a change in class service on February 23, 2016, this train only serves executive class and operates using executive trains manufactured in 2009 and 2010. Meanwhile, several former Purwojaya executive class train sets were transferred to Kutoarjo Train Depot, Yogyakarta, and Bandung, while the business class train sets were donated to Kutoarjo Train Depot, Jakarta Kota, and Yogyakarta. The remaining old train sets serve as reserve train sets, now used as executive class train sets for the Kamandaka Train. Some of the 2010 executive train sets were transferred to Cirebon Station.

Starting on September 28, 2018, the Purwojaya train operated using 2018 stainless steel train sets until a train exchange with the Bima Train, which uses the New Image Executive class made of lightweight steel.

== Incident ==
On October 25, 2025, at 2:14 PM WIB, Purwojaya train number 58F derailed at the Kedunggedeh Station yard, Bekasi Regency, West Java. In this incident, 2 trains derailed, namely the executive train 8 and the power train which was in the rearmost position, both train units derailed right on the bridge on the west side of the station. There were no fatalities in this incident.

== Timetable ==
Timetable as of February 2021.

KA 85, 88A (Cilacap - Gambir)			KA 86, 87A (Gambir - Cilacap)		
Station	Arrive	Depart	Station	Arrive	Depart
Cilacap	-	14.30	Gambir	-	21.20
Maos	14.57	15.00	Bekasi	21.56	21.58
Kroya	15.12	15.30	Cirebon	00.18	00.30
Purwokerto	15.55	16.02	Purwokerto	02.48	02.55
Cirebon	17.57	18.02	Kroya	03.20	03.44
Bekasi	20.26	20.28	Maos	03.56	03.59
Jatinegara	20.45	20.47	Cilacap	04.26	-
Gambir	21.03	-			

== See also ==
- Rail transport in Indonesia
- List of named passenger trains of Indonesia
