= Purwokerto railway station =

Railway station in Indonesia

Purwokerto station Stasiun Purwokerto
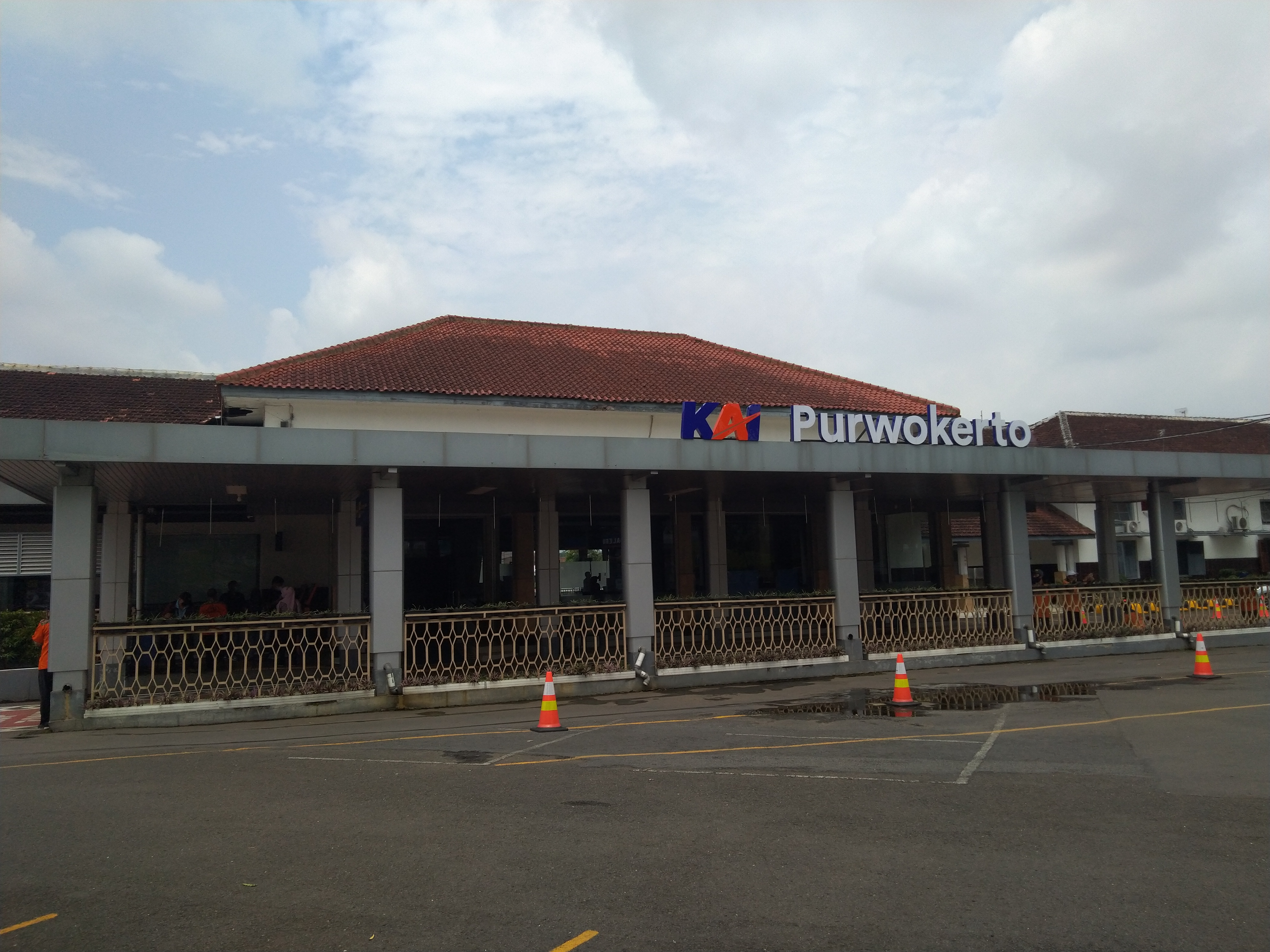
- Entrance of Purwokerto station in 2021

General information
- Location: West Purwokerto, Banyumas Regency; Central Java; Indonesia
- Coordinates: 7.4192°S 109.2220°E
- Elevation: 75 m (246 ft)
- Owner: Kereta Api Indonesia
- Operator: Kereta Api Indonesia
- Lines: Prupuk–Kroya; Purwokerto–Wonosobo (closed)
- Platforms: 1 side platform 4 Island platforms
- Tracks: 7
- Connections: Trans Banyumas: 1 3A 3B; Trans Jateng: B1

Construction
- Structure type: Ground
- Parking: Available
- Cycle facilities: Bicycle parking
- Accessible: Available

Other information
- Station code: PWT • 2110
- Classification: Large type A

History
- Opened: 1 July 1916
Location
- Location within Java

Purwokerto Station (PWT) is a large type A railway station located in West Purwokerto, Banyumas Regency, Central Java, Indonesia. The station is located at an altitude of 75 m. It is the largest station under the management of PT Kereta Api Indonesia (Persero) Operation Area V Purwokerto. As a large station, all trains that pass through the Prupuk–Kroya railway line must stop at this station.

== History ==
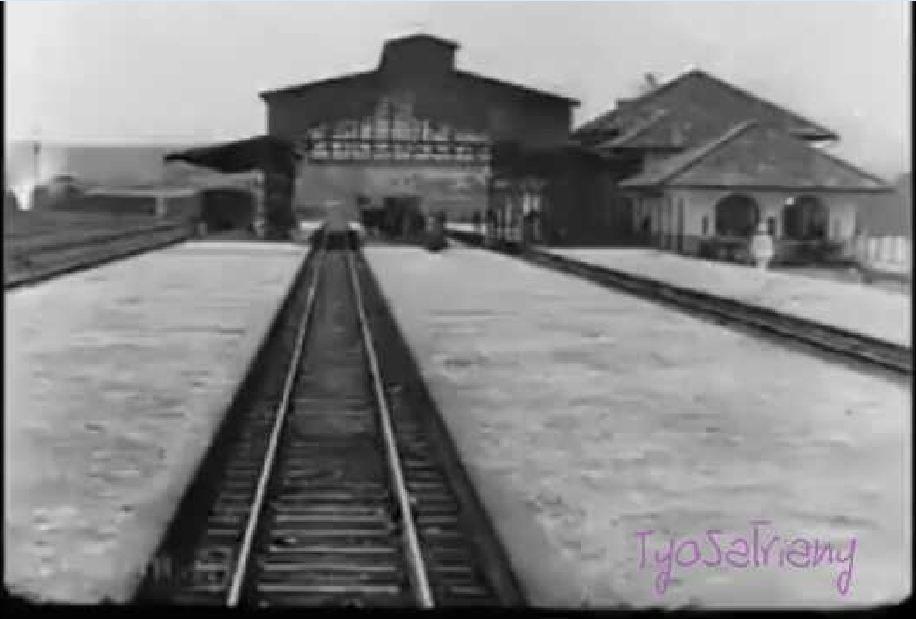
The station c. 1920s

Purwokerto Station was built in 1917-1918 by the Staatsspoorwegen (SS) railway company. The older station in Purwokerto is in the town center, built by Serajoedal Stoomtram Maatschappij in 1893-1896.

The station was built on the Cirebon–Kroya line. In 1923 Purwokerto Station was connected to Purwokerto Timur railway station, allowing travelers from Jakarta to connect to Wonosobo or Purbalingga. But unfortunately in 1978 the line was closed. Now along the former route, a new transportation mode in the form of minibuses has been served since 23 November 2018. Based on the Appendix to Presidential Regulation No. 79 of 2019, this railway line is planned to be reactivated to support infrastructure development in order to increase inter-regional connectivity through the development of easy and fast mass transportation. The line to Purwokerto Timur Station and the station railyard itself was still used for loading and unloading of the Pupuk Sriwidjaja Palembang (PUSRI) fertilizer carriages until it was permanently closed in 2008.

== Building and layout ==
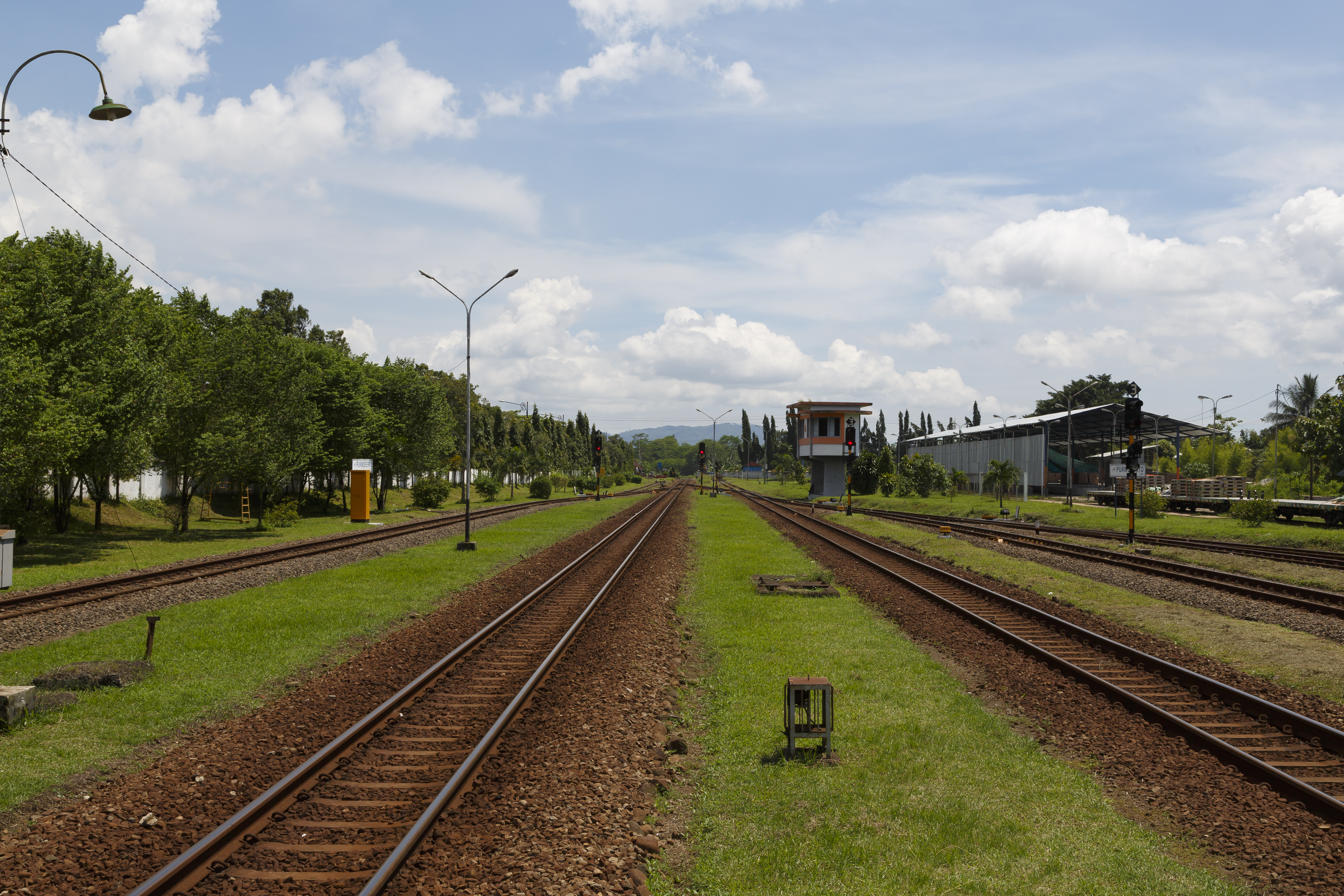
The emplacement of the station, 2015

Purwokerto Station originally had six train lines with track 2 being a straight line. Since the operation of the Purwokerto–Patuguran double track segment as of 9 September 2009, the lines increased to seven active lines. Line 2 is the main line / straight line for a single track from / to Kroya–Yogyakarta–Surabaya and also for the upstream double track (to Cirebon–Jakarta). Line 3 is straight line for downstream double path (from Cirebon–Jakarta), both of which serve as the arrival and departure routes of train. Line 1 is used when line 2 and 3 are carrying a train. Lines 4-6 are usually for locomotive parking and railway circuit. From line 7 three additional lines access the locomotive depot and station located at the northwest of the station. All paths other than the lines connected with the dials are connected directly to the main line.

Next, as of 28 January 2019, with the completion of the Purwokerto–Kroya double track segment, line 2 is fully used as a straight gauge for the Prupuk direction, while line 3 is fully used as a straight line for the Kroya direction. The typical old electrical signaling system from Daop V has been replaced with the latest production by PT Len Industri.

This station is the east end station of the double tracks line crossing south of Java Island which will connect Jakarta–Surabaya. With the double track, the Jakarta–Purwokerto route and vice versa can be reached for an average of five hours only.

== Services ==
The following is a list of train services at the Purwokerto Station

Train services	Destination(s)	Class type
Argo Lawu (regular and facultative)	Gambir and Solo Balapan	Executive class / Luxury
Argo Dwipangga (regular and facultative)	Gambir and Solo Balapan	Executive / Luxury
Gajayana (regular and additional)	Gambir and Malang	Executive / Luxury
Bima & Argo Semeru	Gambir and Surabaya Gubeng	Executive
Taksaka (regular and additional)	Gambir and Yogyakarta	Executive
Purwojaya	Gambir and Cilacap via Kroya	Executive
Purwojaya (additional)	Gambir and Cilacap via Kroya	Executive/ Business
Ranggajati	Cirebon and Jember via Yogyakarta - Surabaya Gubeng	Executive/ Business
Kertanegara	Malang via Yogyakarta	Executive/ Economy AC plus
Bangunkarta	Pasar Senen and Jombang	Executive/ Economy AC plus
Sawunggalih	Pasar Senen and Kutoarjo	Executive/ Economy AC Premium
Fajar and Senja Utama Solo	Pasar Senen and Solo Balapan	Executive/ Economy AC Premium
Fajar Utama YK	Pasar Senen and Yogyakarta	Executive/ Economy AC Premium
Senja Utama YK	Pasar Senen and Yogyakarta	Executive/ Economy AC Premium
Jaka Tingkir	Pasar Senen and Purwosari	Executive / Economy AC plus
Bogowonto	Pasar Senen and Lempuyangan	Executive / Economy AC plus
Gajahwong	Pasar Senen and Lempuyangan	Executive / Economy AC plus
Singasari	Pasar Senen and Blitar via Yogyakarta - Kediri	Executive / Economy AC plus
Kamandaka	Semarang Tawang via Slawi - Tegal	Executive / Economy AC plus
Gaya Baru Malam Selatan	Pasar Senen and Surabaya Gubeng	Executive / Economy AC plus
Kutojaya Utara (regular)	Jakarta Kota and Kutoarjo	Economy AC Premium
Bengawan	Pasar Senen and Purwosari	Economy AC
Progo	Pasar Senen and Lempuyangan	Economy AC
Serayu	Kroya continued Pasar Senen via Kiaracondong	Economy AC
Kutoarjo Utara (Additional)	Pasar Senen and Kutoarjo	Economy AC / Business
Logawa	Jember via Lempuyangan - Surabaya Gubeng	Economy AC / Business
Cakrabuana train	Gambir	Economy and executive
Batavia train	Gambir	Economy and executive
Malioboro Express	Malang	Economy and executive
Baturraden Express (facultative)	Bandung	Economy and executive

== Supporting transportation ==
Public transportation type	Route	Destination	Nearby access from the station
KAI Operational Area V minibus	–	Purwokerto Station–Purbalingga–Banjarnegara–Wonosobo	Station area
Trans Jateng	B1	Bukateja bus terminal–Bulupitu bus terminal	West and east gate
Trans Banyumas	1	Pasar Pon–Ajibarang bus terminal	West gate
Trans Banyumas	3	Kebondalem bus terminal–Bulupitu bus terminal	West gate

== Gallery ==
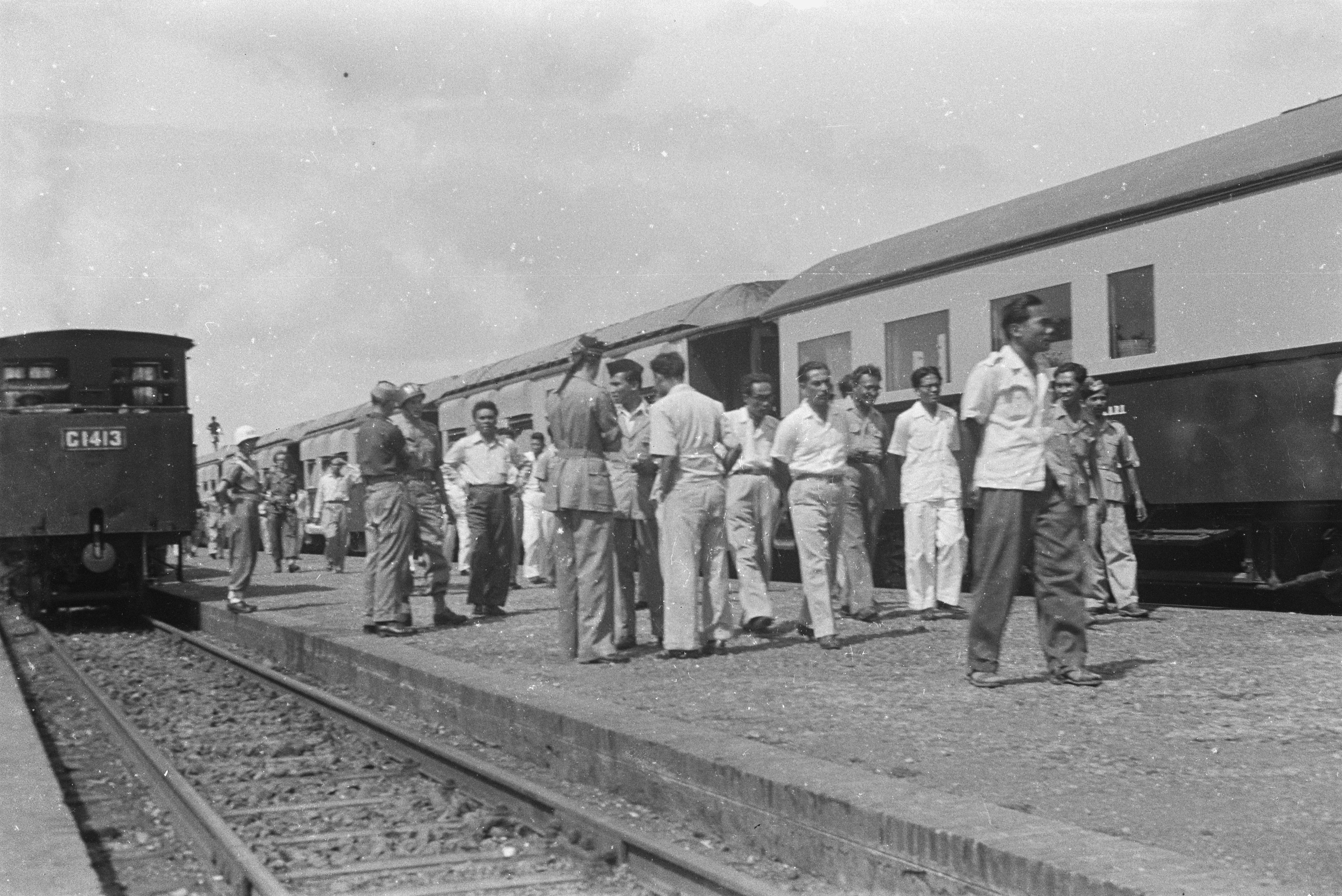
C1413 locomotive shunting at Purwokerto station

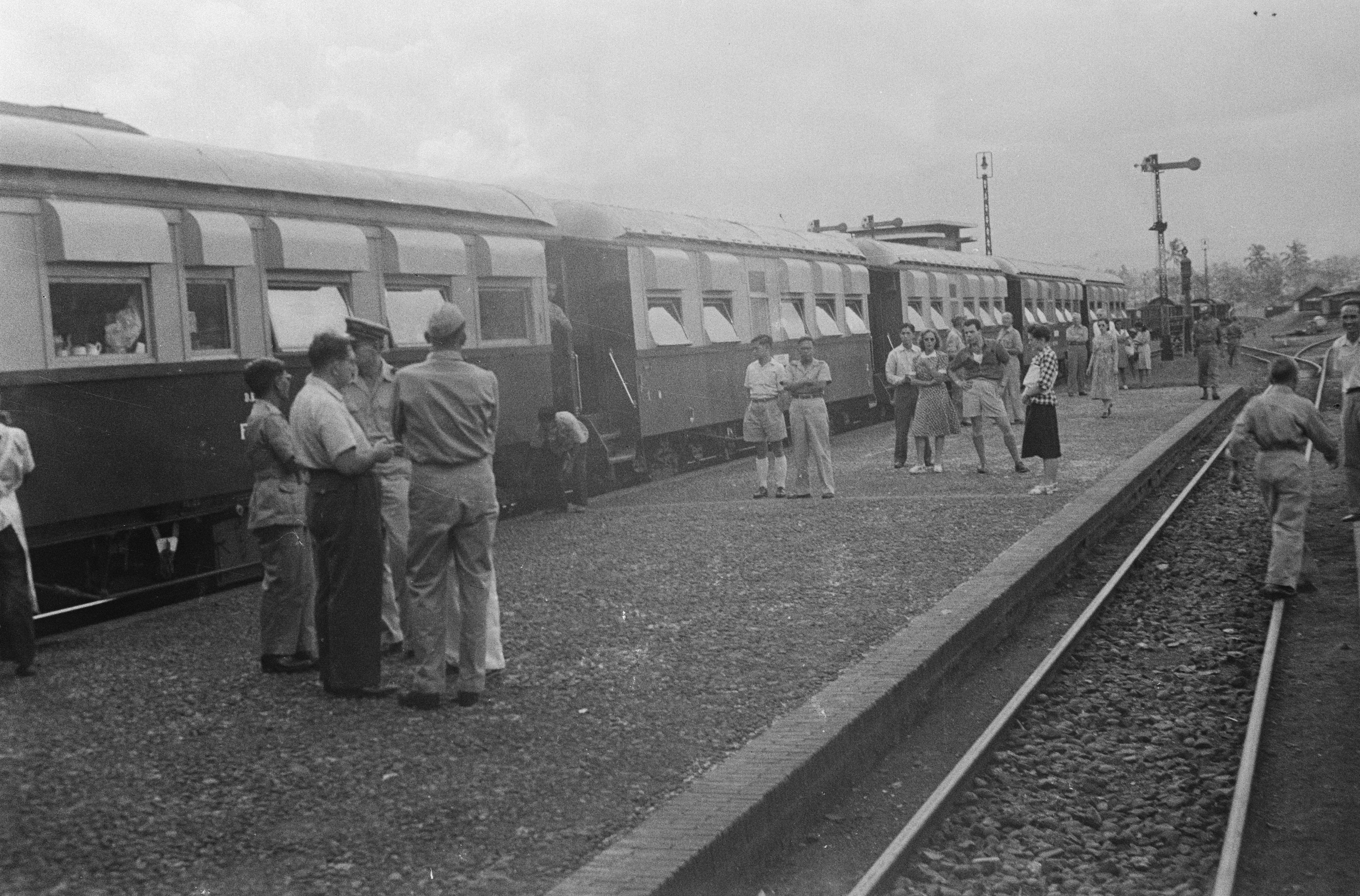
The platform of the station, c. 1948

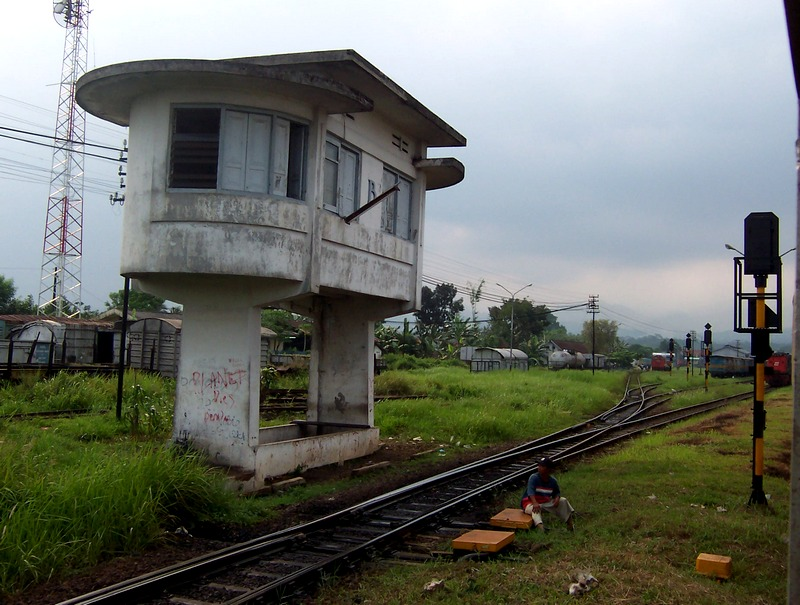
The B signal box at the south of the station

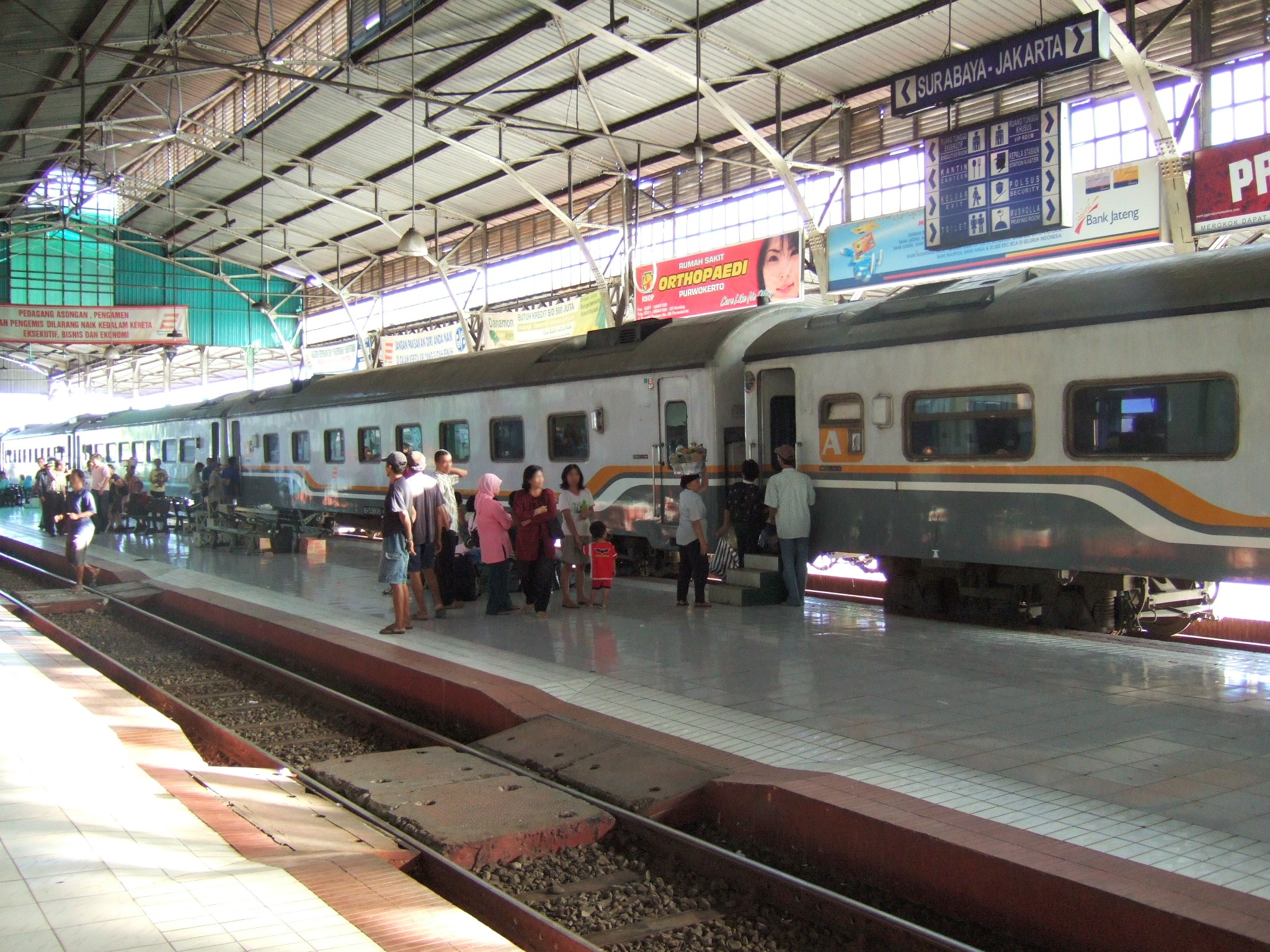
The Taksaka train at Purwokerto station

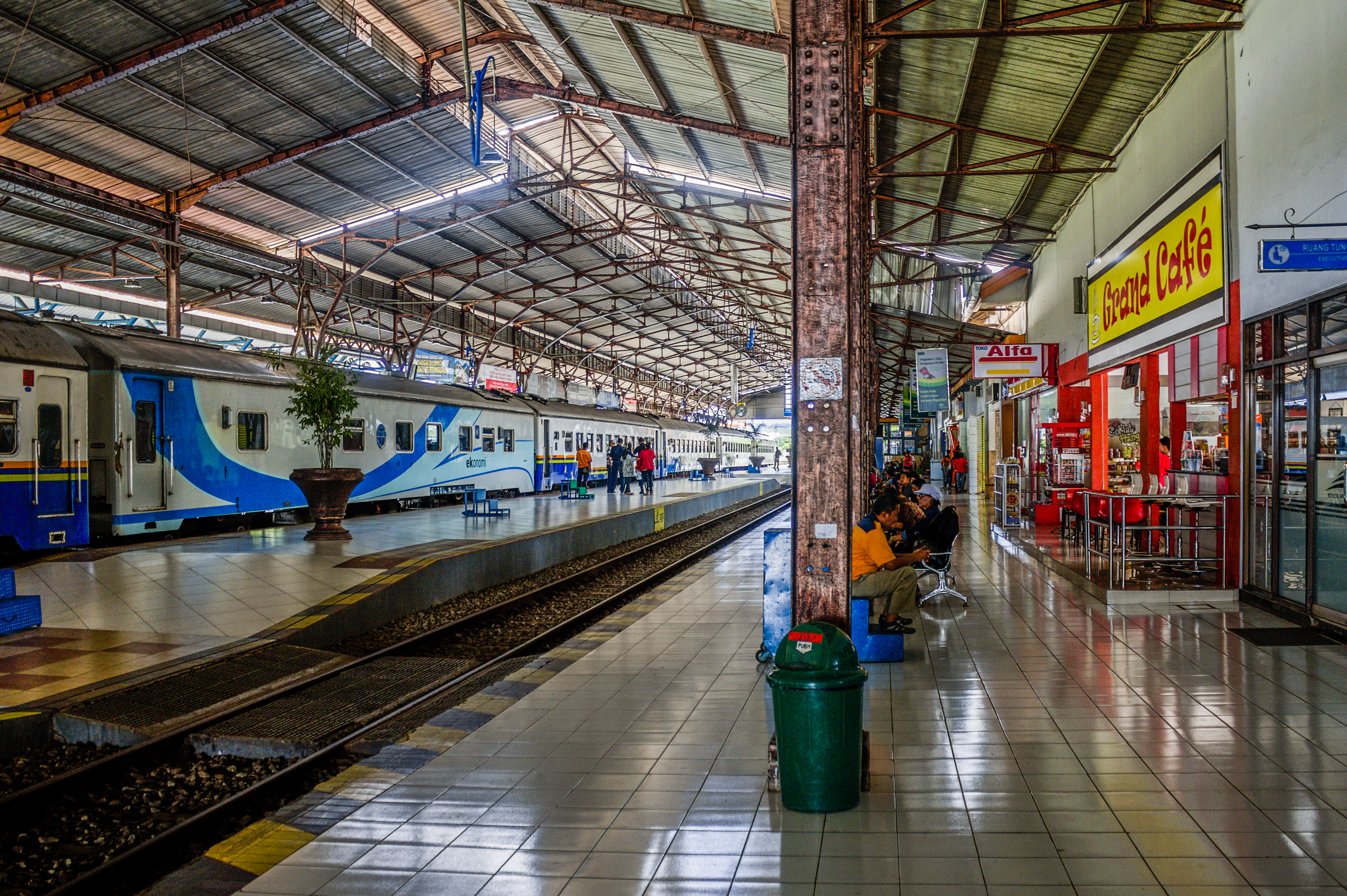
The platform and interior of the station

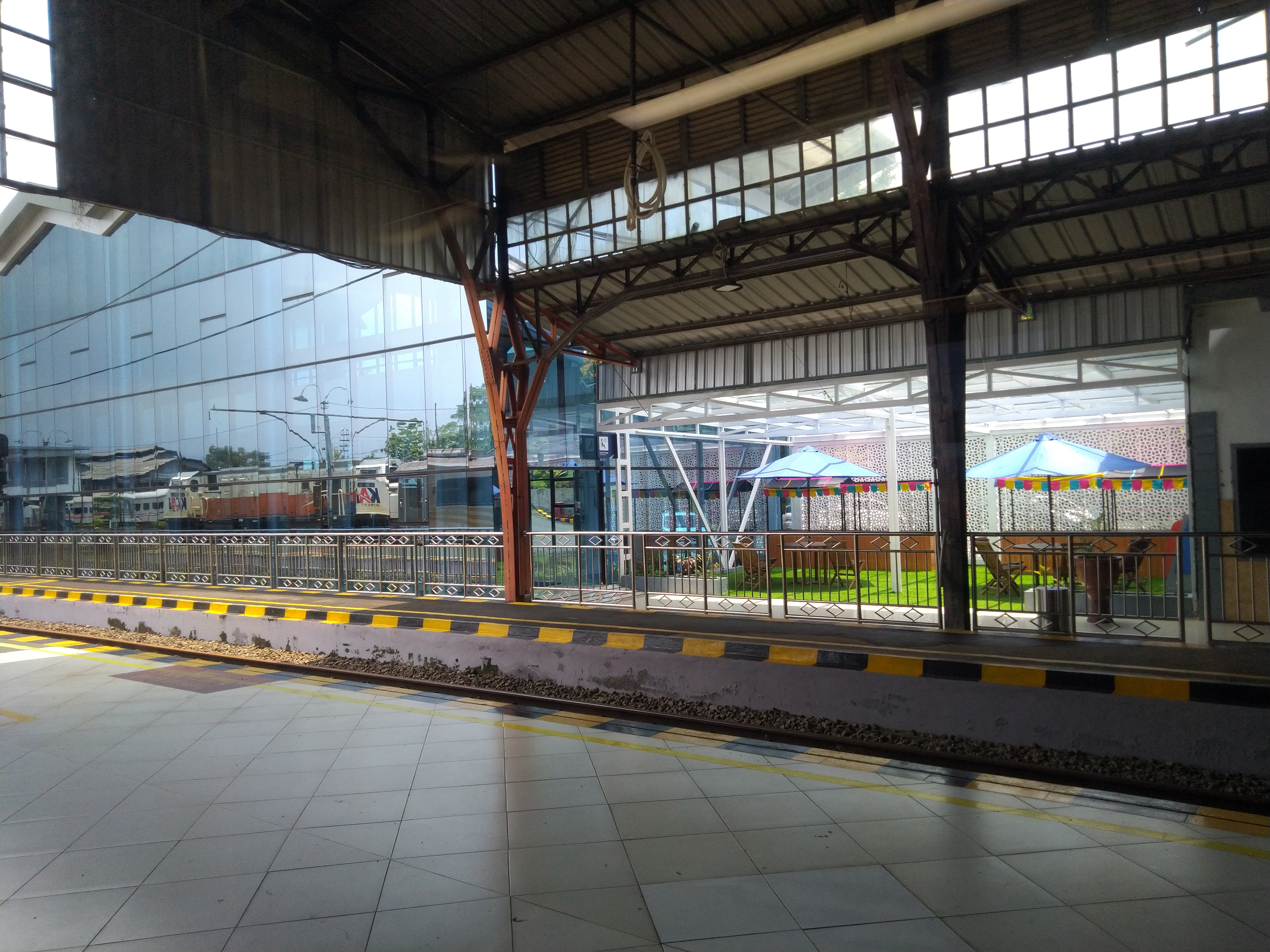
A new waiting room at Purwokerto station

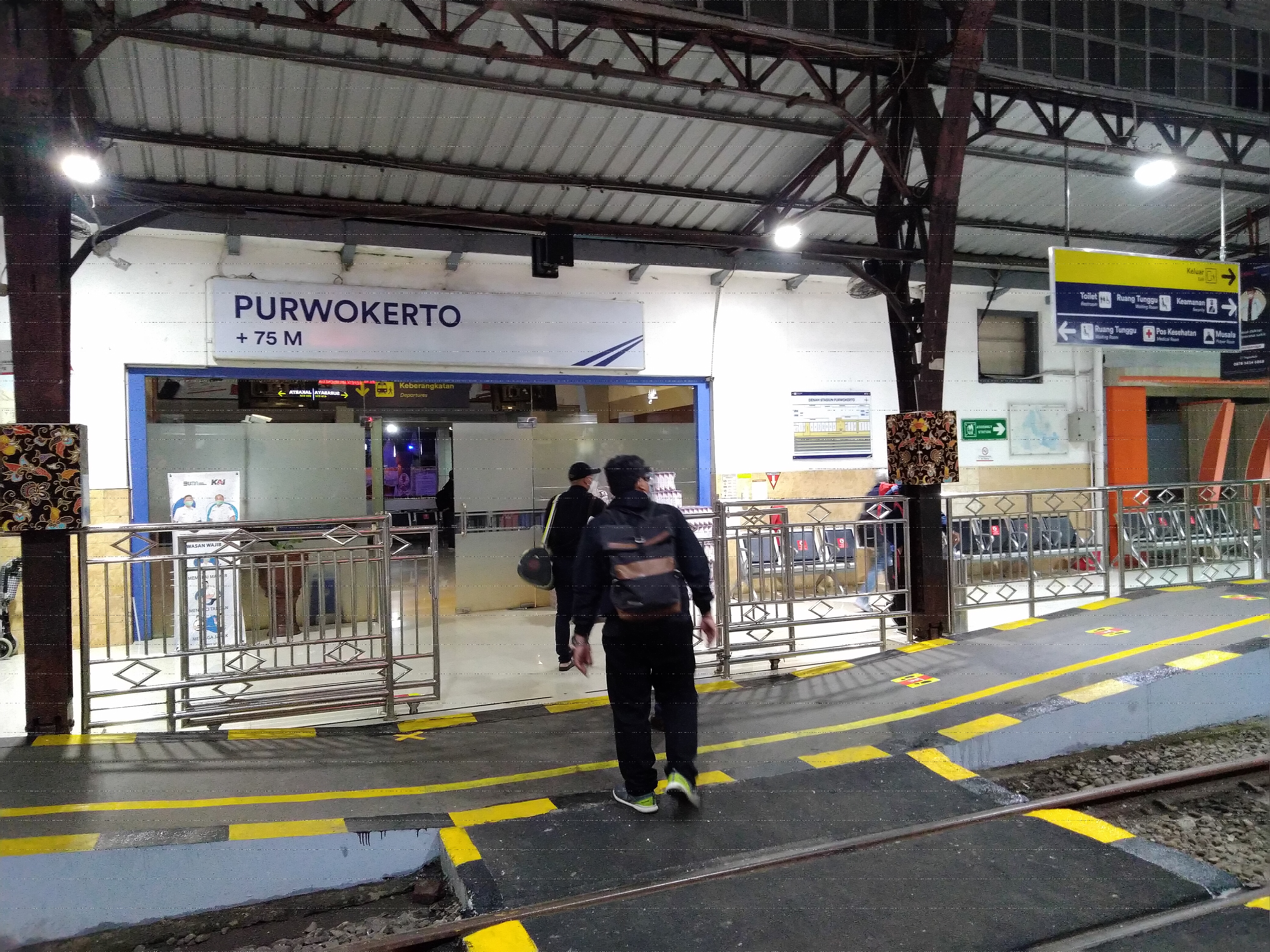
The 2020 version of the station signage

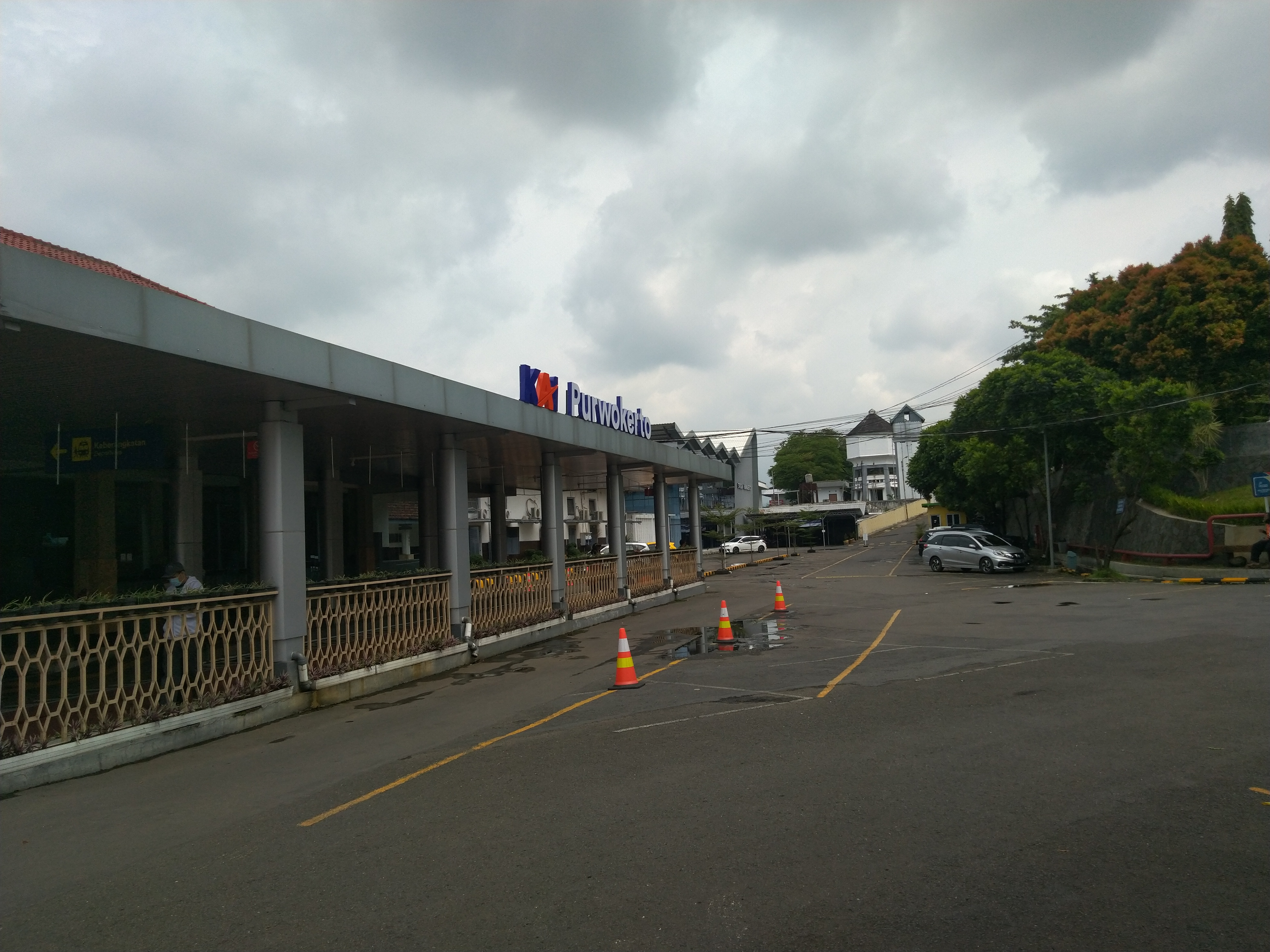
The main lobby of Purwokerto station, with the parking area, and water tower at the background, 2021

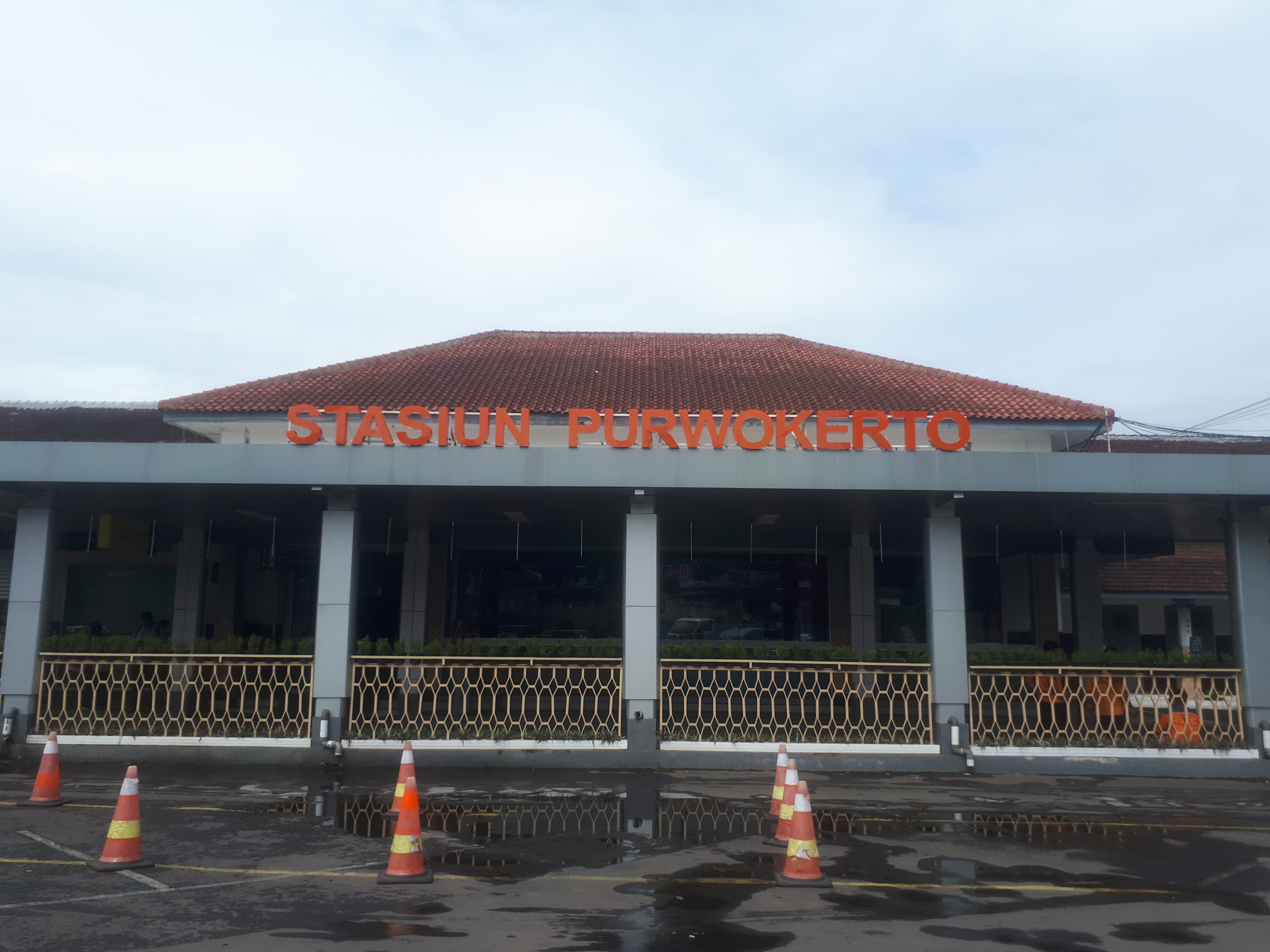
The main lobby of the station, 2020

Preceding station	Kereta Api Indonesia	Following station
Karanggandul towards Prupuk	Prupuk–Kroya	Notog towards Kroya
Terminus	Purwokerto–Wonosobo (Closed)	~~Purwokerto Timur~~ towards ~~Wonosobo~~
