= Pasar Senen railway station =

Railway station in Indonesia

C04 Pasar Senen Station Stasiun Pasar Senen
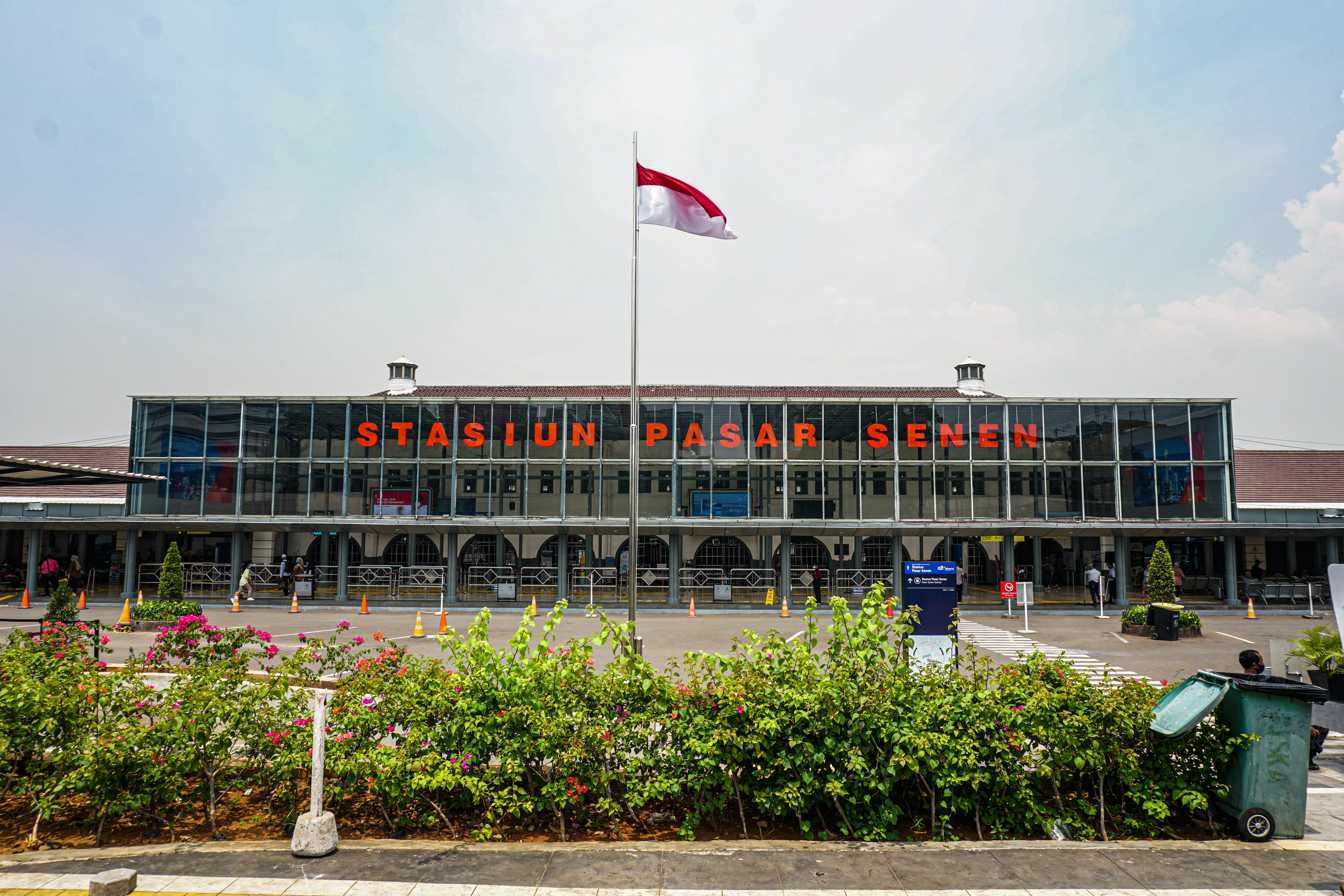
- The façade of Pasar Senen Station, taken on 16 October 2020.

General information
- Location: Jl. Stasiun Senen No. 14, Senen, Senen, Central Jakarta; Jakarta; Indonesia
- Coordinates: 6°10′28″S 106°50′40″E
- Elevation: +4.7 m (15 ft)
- System: Inter-city rail and commuter rail station
- Owner: Kereta Api Indonesia
- Operator: Kereta Api Indonesia; KAI Commuter
- Lines: Rajawali–Cikampek railway; Cikarang Loop Line
- Platforms: 1 island platform 2 side platforms
- Tracks: 6
- Connections: Senen Toyota Rangga; Jaga Jakarta

Construction
- Parking: Available
- Cycle facilities: Bicycle parking
- Accessible: Available
- Architect: J. van Gendt
- Architectural style: New Indies

Other information
- Station code: PSE • 0470
- Classification: Large type A

History
- Opened: 1887
- Rebuilt: 1925
- Electrified: 1924

Services
Preceding station		Following station
Kemayoran towards Kampung Bandan or Jakarta Kota via Pasar Senen	Cikarang Commuter Line	Gang Sentiong One-way operation
Cikarang Commuter Line towards Bekasi or Cikarang does not stop here
Location
- Location within Jakarta

Pasar Senen Station (PSE) is a railway station located in Jakarta, Indonesia. It is the second largest railway station in Jakarta after Gambir Station. It is located close to Pasar Senen market area in Senen, Senen, Central Jakarta. The current building was built in 1918 and inaugurated on 19 March 1925.

Pasar Senen only serves Economy and Business class intercity train except Gumarang and Sawunggalih. It also serves as a station for northbound KRL Commuterline trains.

== History ==
=== Background ===
The name of this train station comes from a market with the same name. It is called Pasar Senen because this market is only open on Mondays; founded by the Colonial Government in 1733 to revive the economy of the Weltevreden people who later became Gambir, Central Jakarta.

During the leadership of Governor General Petrus Albertus van der Parra, Pasar Senen was getting busier so that it was open every day. Many Chinese traders opened their businesses in this market. Since independence until 1975, Pasar Senen has continued to be developed as a center for Monday market trading and by that period served as the main backbone of Jakarta's economy.

=== First generation (1887–1925) ===
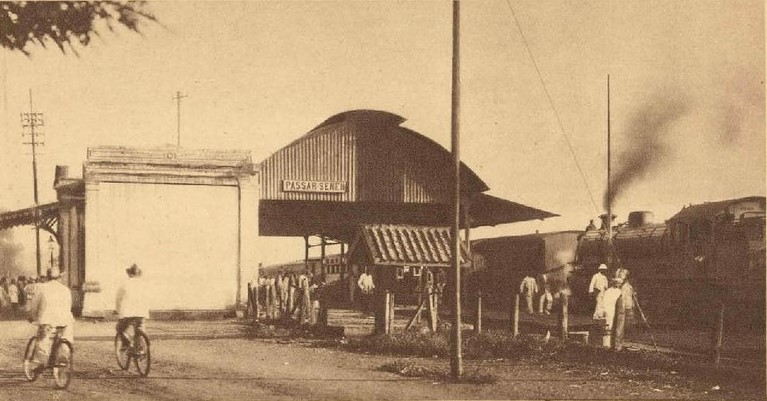
The first generation of the Pasar Senen Station

The development of Pasar Senen requires adequate transportation facilities, especially trains. This station was opened by the Bataviasche Oosterspoorweg Maatschappij (BOS) on 31 March 1887 as a small stop. The opening of this station coincided with the opening of the Batavia-Bekasi railway line. The line was then bought by Staatsspoorwegen (SS) in 1898 because of BOS' debt which was swelling.

In 1904, De Ingenieur magazine mentioned that this station had undergone renovations (possibly changing the building to become permanent). This development is also part of the construction of the Kemayoran Station, which both cost ƒ350,000.00. This first generation station building was Indische Empire style, small, and had an arc overcapping roof similar to the Maos, Kutoarjo, and Purworejo Stations.

=== Second generation (1925–now) ===
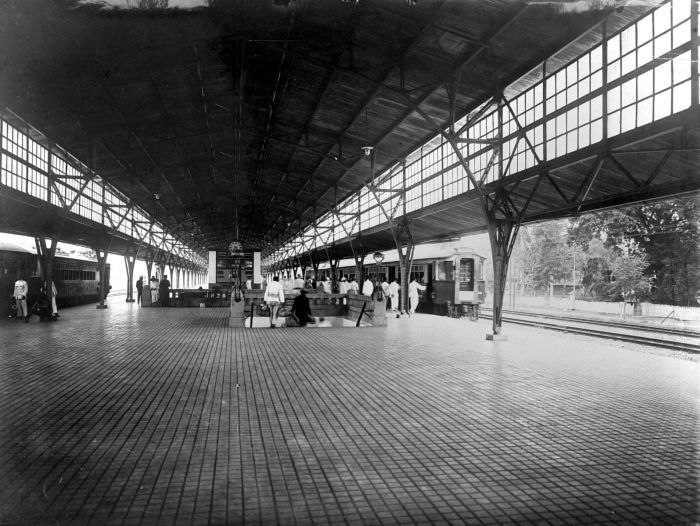
The platform of the second generation of the station

As passenger traffic increased, Pasar Senen Station was rebuilt with a fairly large face. Because it was affected by the construction of the new station, the old Pasar Senen Station had to be torn down. The station opened on 19 March 1925 after eight years of construction. Having the layout of an island station, this station is equipped with two underground tunnels. There are two tunnels, one for departing passengers and one for exiting the station.

This rebuilding was carried out to welcome the operation of the SS's new service, the electric multiple unit and to commemorate the 50th anniversary of the SS on 6 April 1925. SS presented a number of magnificent train stations in Batavia which were expected to provide passenger satisfaction.

Currently the station building has the status of a cultural heritage by the Central Unit for Preservation and Architectural Design of PT KAI, the Ministry of Culture and Tourism, and the Provincial Government of DKI Jakarta. Determination of cultural heritage status is based on the Decree of the Minister of Culture and Tourism No: PM.13/PW.007/MKP/05 and Decree of the Governor of DKI Jakarta No. 475 of 1993.

== Building and layout ==
=== Main building ===
The station has six railway lines with lines 3 and 4 being straight tracks. This building was designed by J. van Gendt, with a Neo-Indische architectural style. Its vernacular character is very prominent, it can be seen from the dominating pyramid roof with eaves added above the entrance hall to protect the building from rainwater seepage, and when viewed from the outside it looks like a two-story building. The doors are in Romanesque style with exposed roof consoles.

This station became popular because it was always visited by travelers who wanted to use rail services to various destinations on the island of Java. In order to make passenger arrangements more comfortable, the Jakarta Operational Area I provides separate doors according to the type of train, namely for long-distance trains and for KRL Commuterline. In addition, there is also an underground tunnel that connects the platform lines 1 to 3 and lines 4 to 6.

C04
G
Side platform, the doors are opened to the right of the train's departure from the east

Line 6
←(Kemayoran) Cikarang Loop Line (counterclockwise loop) towards Kampung Bandan
Intercity train arrival route
Line 5
The turning lane as well as parking for the train circuit
Line 4
Intercity train arrival track

The direct running track of the freight train direction to Tanjung Priuk/Jakarta Gudang

Straight lines to Kampung Bandan

Side platform, the doors are opened to the left of the train's departure from the east
Central building
Side platform, the doors are opened to the left of the train's departure to the east
Line 3
Departure line for long series intercity trains

The direct running track of the freight train from Tanjung Priuk/Jakarta Gudang

Straight lines to Jatinegara

Line 2
Pass through, not stopping: Cikarang Loop Line to Cikarang (Gang Sentiong) →
Line 1
Intercity train departure routes
Side platform, the doors are opened to the right of the train's departure to the east
G
Main building

=== Tekad Merdeka Monument ===
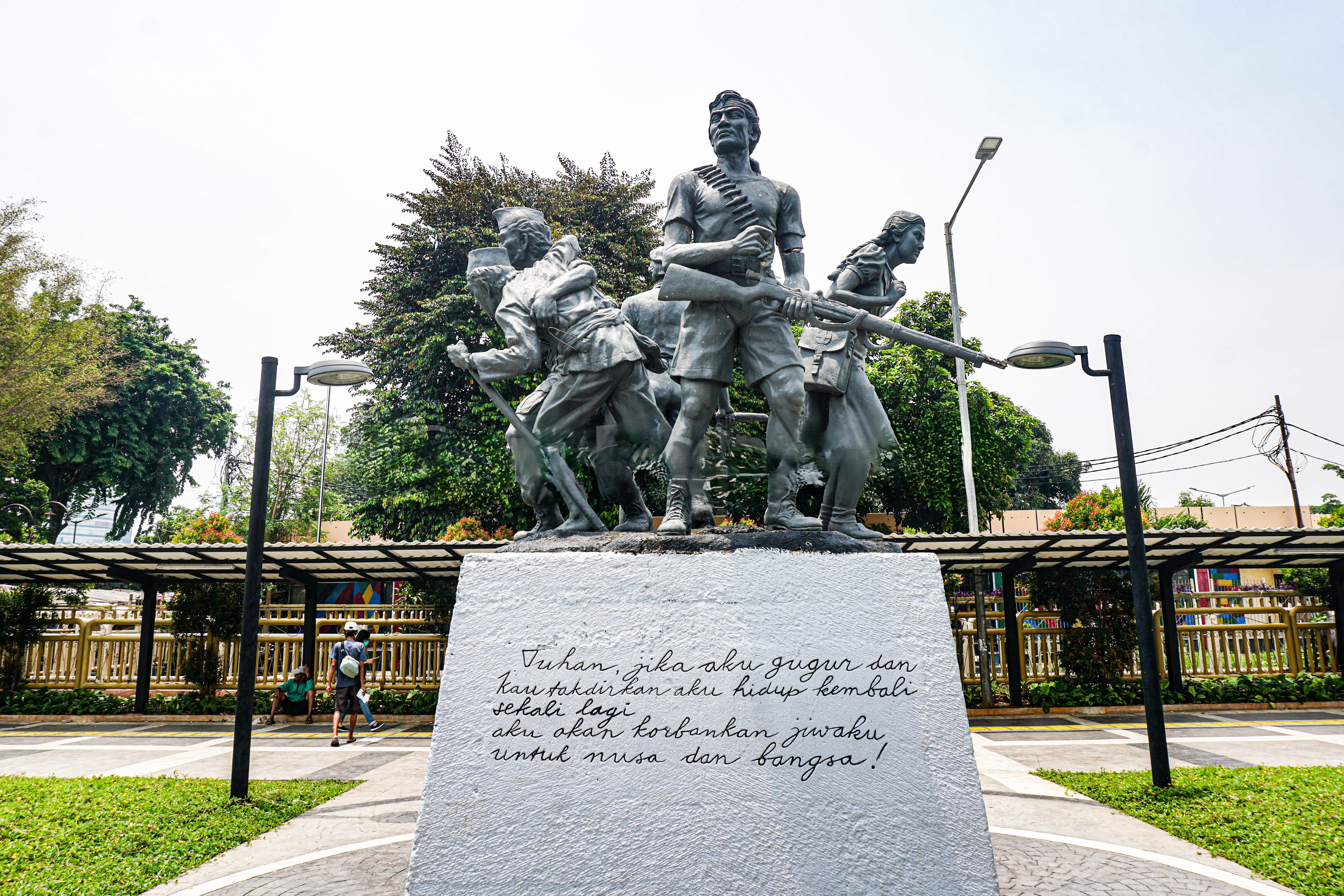
The "Tekad Merdeka" Monument at the station

A monument at the front of the station called the "Tekad Merdeka Monument" or "Monumen Perjuangan Senen" commemorates the bloodshed against the Allied forces in the area of Senen on 29 September 1945. It was inaugurated on 2 May 1982 by the Mayor of Central Jakarta, A. Munir. This monument was made with cement stone lathe cast concrete construction and was imported from Sleman Regency, Yogyakarta.

== Services ==
The station serves both KRL Commuterline and long-distance train. 34 long-distance trains depart from Pasar Senen station daily.

=== Mixed Class ===
- Bangunkarta, from and to Jombang (new image executive and economy modification newgen class)
- Blambangan Express from and to Ketapang (stainless steel executive and economy modification newgen class)
- Bogowonto, from and to Lempuyangan via Purwokerto (newgen executive and newgen economy class)
- Brantas, from and to Blitar via Semarang Poncol (executive and newgen modification economy class)
- Dharmawangsa, from and to Surabaya Pasar Turi (executive and newgen modification economy class)
- Fajar Utama Solo, to Solo Balapan via Purwokerto (newgen executive and newgen economy class)
- Fajar Utama Yogya, from and to Yogyakarta via Purwokerto (stainless steel executive and stainless steel premium economy class)
- Gajahwong, from and to Lempuyangan via Purwokerto (stainless steel executive and stainless steel premium economy class)
- Gaya Baru Malam Selatan, from and to Surabaya Gubeng (newgen executive and newgen economy class)
- Gumarang, from and to Surabaya Pasar Turi via Semarang Tawang (newgen executive and newgen economy class)
- Jayabaya, from and to Malang via Surabaya Pasar Turi (newgen executive and newgen economy class)
- Madiun Jaya from and to Madiun (executive modification and economy)
- Mataram, from and to Solo Balapan via Purwokerto (newgen executive and newgen economy class)
- Menoreh, from and to Semarang Tawang Bank Jateng (executive and new image premium economy class)
- Sawunggalih, from and to Kutoarjo via Purwokerto (stainless steel executive and stainless steel premium economy class)
- Senja Utama Solo, from Solo Balapan via Purwokerto (newgen executive and newgen economy class)
- Senja Utama Yogya, from and to Yogyakarta via Purwokerto (stainless steel executive and stainless steel preium economy class)
- Singasari, from and to Blitar via Purwokerto (executive and economy class)
- Tawangjaya Premium, from and to Semarang Tawang Bank Jateng (executive and new image premium economy class)
- Tegal Bahari, from and to Tegal (newgen executive and newgen economy class)
- Kutojaya Utara Facultative, from and to Kutoarjo (business and economy class)
- Kertajaya Tambahan, from and to Surabaya Pasar Turi (business and economy class)
- Brantas Addition, from and to Blitar via Semarang (business and economy class)

Note:
* Brantas Tambahan & Kertajaya Tambahan only operates during high season e.g. new year, eid al fitr
* Kutojaya Utara Fakultatif only operates during weekends & high season e.g. new year, eid al fitr

=== Full Economy Class ===
- Jaka Tingkir, from and to Solo Balapan (newgen economy class)
- Jayakarta, from and to Surabaya Gubeng via Yogyakarta (new image premium economy class)
- Kertajaya, from and to Surabaya Pasarturi (stainless steel premium economy class)
- Majapahit, from and to Malang via Semarang-Madiun-Blitar (newgen economy class)
- Matarmaja, (reguler and tambahan), from and to Malang via Semarang-Solo-Madiun-Blitar (newgen modification economy class)
- Progo, from and to Lempuyangan via Purwokerto (newgen economy class)
- Tawang Jaya, from and to Semarang Poncol (new image premium economy class)

=== Fully Subsidized Economy Class ===
- Airlangga from and to Surabaya Pasarturi (106 seat economy class)
- Bengawan, from and to Purwosari (106 seat economy class)
- Cikuray, from and to Garut (newgen modification economy class / premium economy modification class)
- Serayu, from and to Purwokerto via Kiaracondong-Kroya (106 seat economy class)

=== KAI Commuter ===
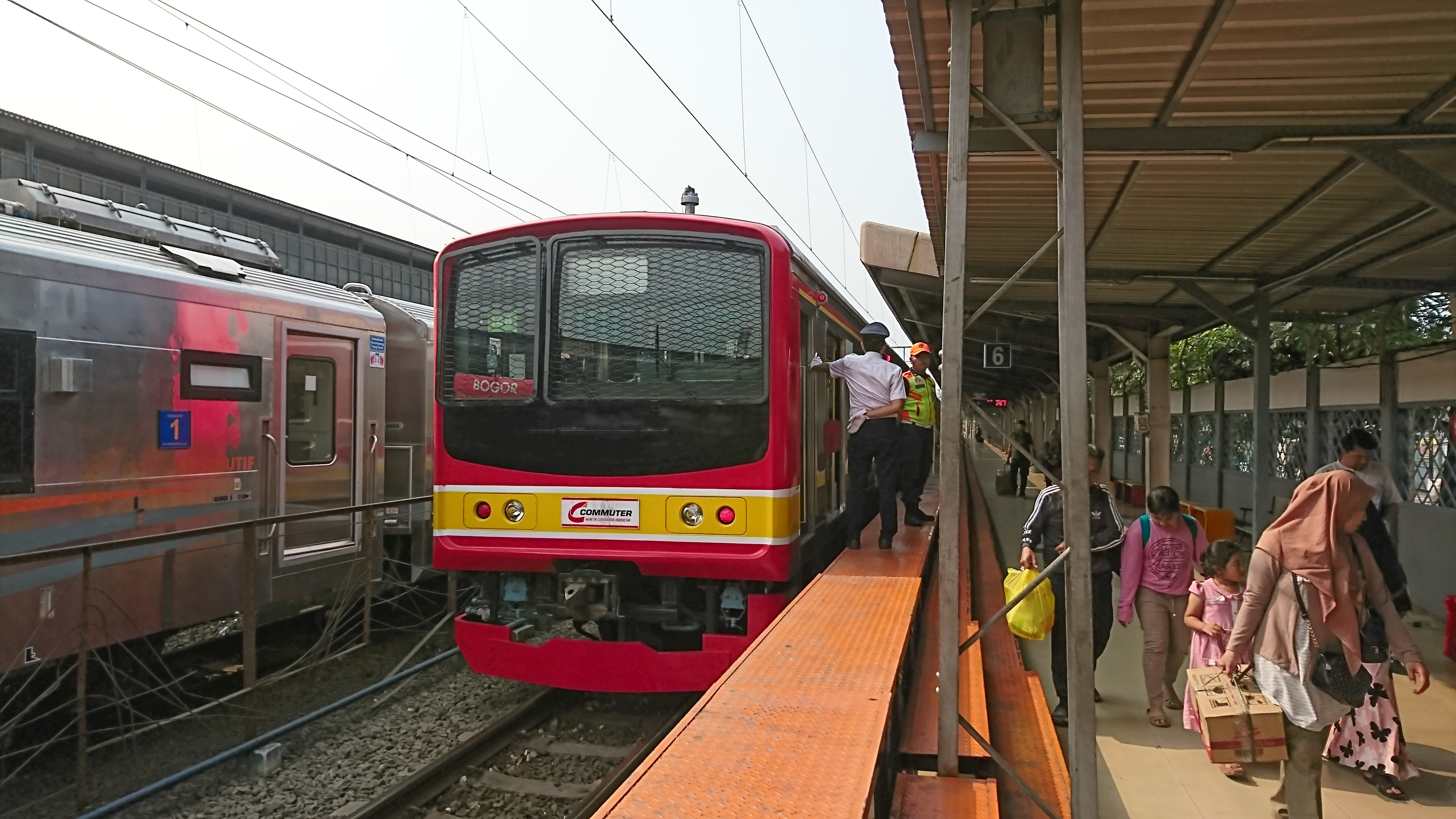
A KRL Commuterline train at the station, with an executive class intercity car in the background.

Pasar Senen only serves northbound, counterclockwise trains towards Kampung Bandan. Clockwise trains going directly towards Jatinegara and Cikarang do not stop at this station.

- Cikarang Loop Line (Full Racket)
  - to Cikarang (counter-clockwise via Tanah Abang and Manggarai)

== Supporting transportation ==
The frontage of Pasar Senen Station has undergone a complete overhaul and was inaugurated by Minister of State-Owned Enterprises Erick Thohir, Minister of Transportation Budi Karya Sumadi, and the Governor of Jakarta Anies Baswedan on 17 June 2020. This renovation program is a collaborative project of KAI, the government of Jakarta, and the Jakarta MRT. The 1,427.5 m^{2} land in front of the station is made into a plaza with pedestrian and disabled access and is integrated with the Senen Toyota Rangga and Jaga Jakarta Transjakarta BRT Stations as well as online motorcycle taxis and auto-rickshaw pick-up points. In order to create a healthy area, the plaza also has a shade canopy, green open space and bicycle parking racks.

Type	Station	Route	Destination
Transjakarta	Senen Toyota Rangga	List of Transjakarta corridors#Corridor 2	Monumen Nasional—Pulo Gadung
Transjakarta	Senen Toyota Rangga	List of Transjakarta corridors#Cross-corridor routes	Rawa Buaya—Pulo Gadung 1
Transjakarta	Senen Toyota Rangga	List of TransJakarta corridors#Cross-corridor routes	Kampung Rambutan—Juanda via Cempaka Putih
Transjakarta	Senen Toyota Rangga	List of TransJakarta corridors#Corridor 14	Jakarta International Stadium–Senen
Transjakarta	Senen Toyota Rangga		Pulo Gadung–JIExpo Kemayoran (only operates during the Jakarta Fair and/or other events on JIExpo Kemayoran)
Transjakarta	Jaga Jakarta	List of Transjakarta corridors#Corridor 5	Ancol—Kampung Melayu
Transjakarta	Jaga Jakarta		JIExpo Kemayoran—Kampung Melayu (only operates during the Jakarta Fair and/or other events on JIExpo Kemayoran)
Transjakarta	N/A	(Metrotrans EV)	Pasar Senen Bus Terminal—Blok M Bus Terminal
Transjakarta	N/A	(Metrotrans)	Pasar Senen Bus Terminal—Tanah Abang Station
Transjakarta	N/A	(Non-BRT)	Pasar Senen Bus Terminal—Dukuh Atas Transport Hub
Transjakarta	Jaga Jakarta	(Non-BRT)	Pasar Senen Bus Terminal—Lebak Bulus via Menteng Raya—Cikini Raya)
Transjakarta	N/A	(Non-BRT)	Pasar Senen Bus Terminal—Pluit via Mangga Dua
Transjakarta	N/A	(Non-BRT)	Pasar Senen Bus Terminal—Tanjung Priok Bus Terminal via Utan Panjang Barat/Timur—Danau Sunter Barat
Transjakarta	N/A	JAK 10B (MikroTrans Jak Lingko)	Gondangdia station—Cikini station via Kramat
Transjakarta	N/A	JAK 17 (MikroTrans Jak Lingko)	Pasar Senen Bus Terminal—Pulo Gadung Bus Terminal via Pemuda
Transjakarta	N/A	JAK 24 (MikroTrans Jak Lingko)	Pasar Senen Bus Terminal—Pulo Gadung Bus Terminalvia Yos Sudarso—Boulevard Barat Kelapa Gading
Mikrolet	N/A	M01	Pasar Senen—Kampung Melayu
Mikrolet	N/A	M12	Pasar Senen—Jakarta Kota
Mikrolet	N/A	M35	TPasar Senen—Pisangan Baru
Mikrolet	N/A	M37	Pasar Senen Bus Terminal—Pulo Gadung Bus Terminal via Sumur Batu Raya, Yos Sudarso, Boulevard Barat Kelapa Gading
Mikrolet	N/A	M46	Pasar Senen Bus Terminal—Pulo Gadung Bus Terminal via Cempaka Putih Tengah, Pemuda
Transjabodetabek	N/A	P9A (Mayasari Bakti)	Pasar Senen Bus Terminal—Bekasi Bus Terminal via Bekasi Timur
Transjabodetabek	N/A	AC100A (MetroMini)	Pasar Senen Bus Terminal—Cileungsi Bus Terminalvia Cibubur
Transjabodetabek	N/A	x2 (Perum DAMRI)	Pasar Senen Bus Terminal—Pondok Cabe Bus Terminal via Sudirman—Thamrin—R.S. Fatmawati

== Gallery ==
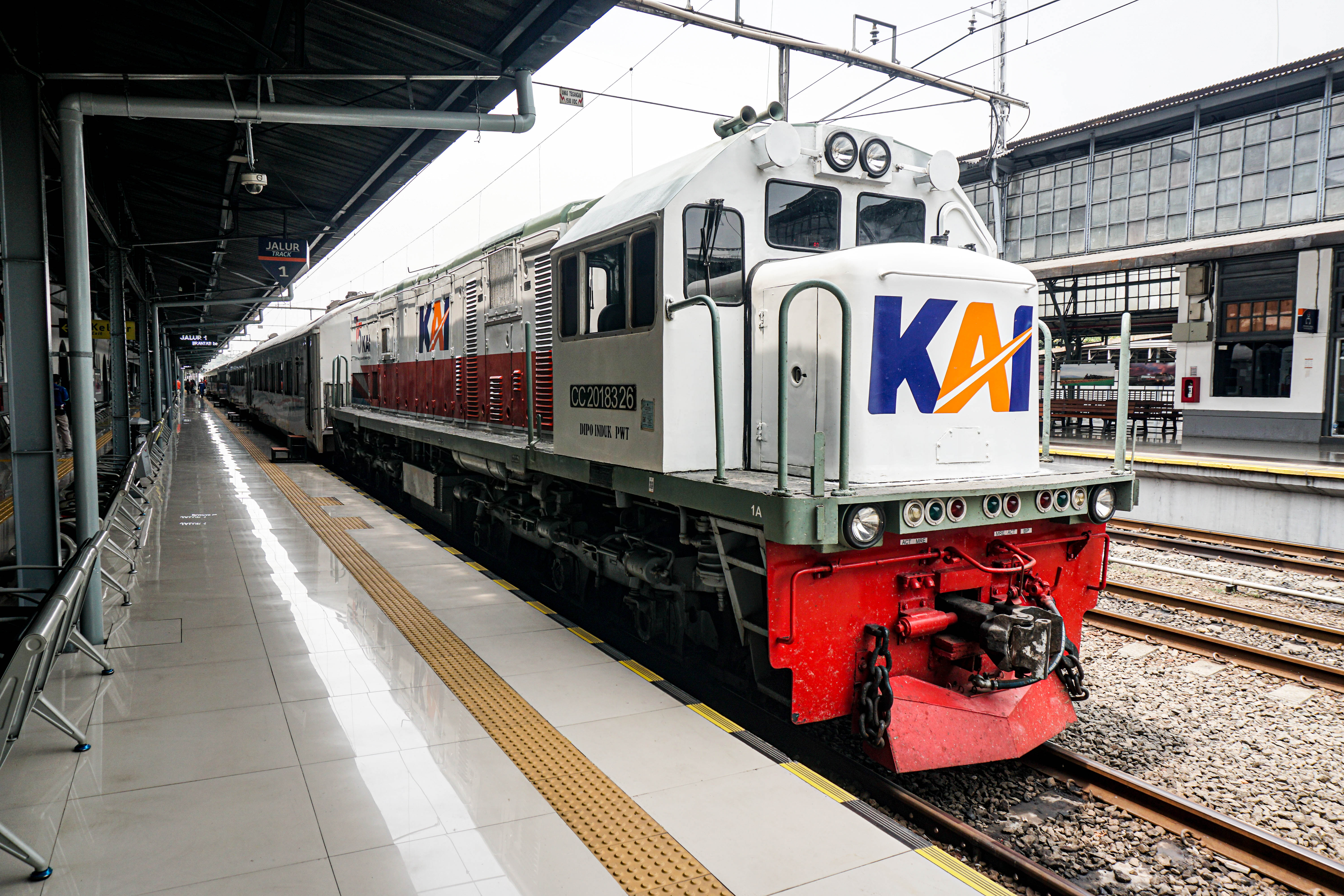
The Brantas train (Blitar–Pasar Senen) with the new logo of KAI at Pasar Senen station

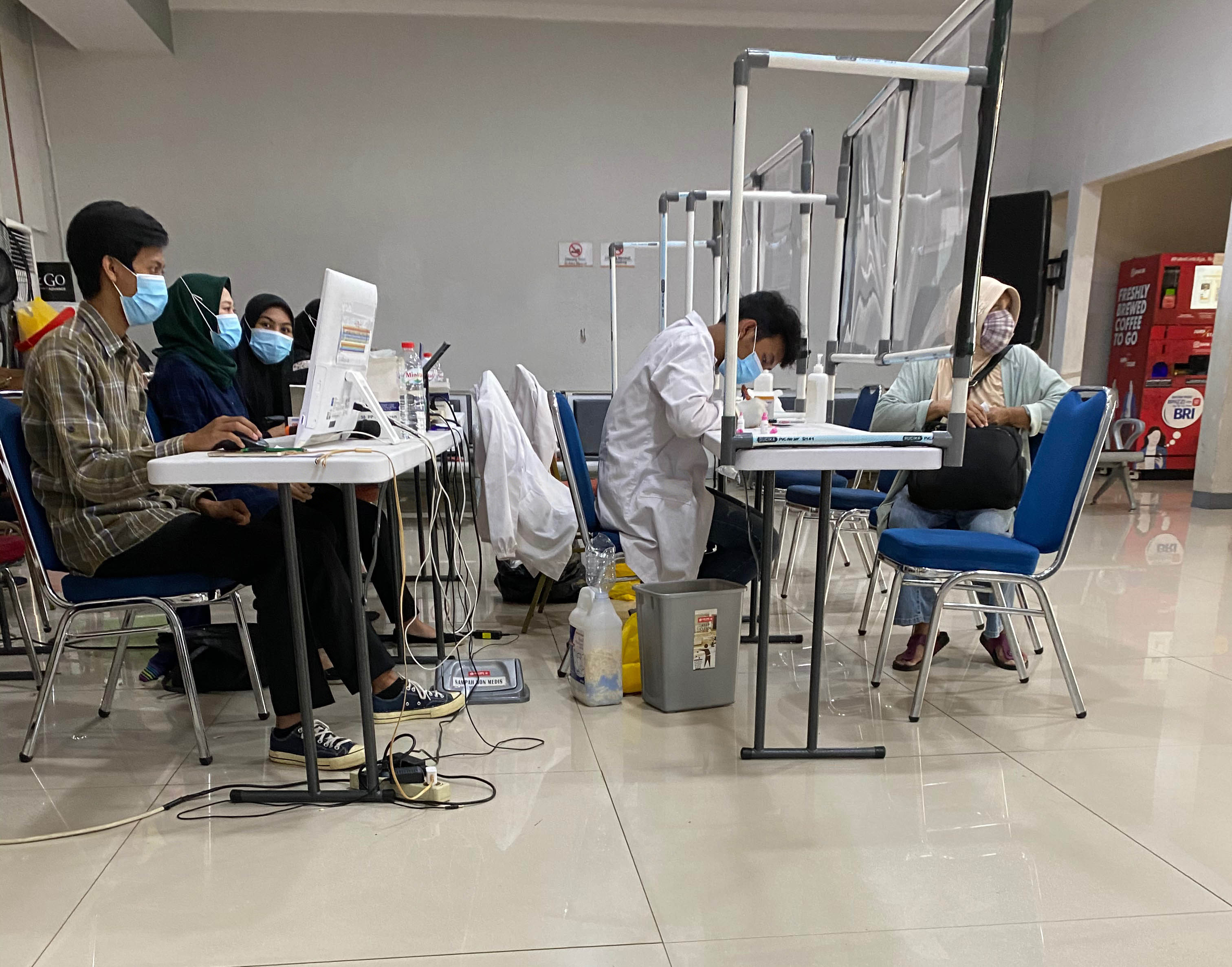
The COVID-19 rapid test service on Pasar Senen station

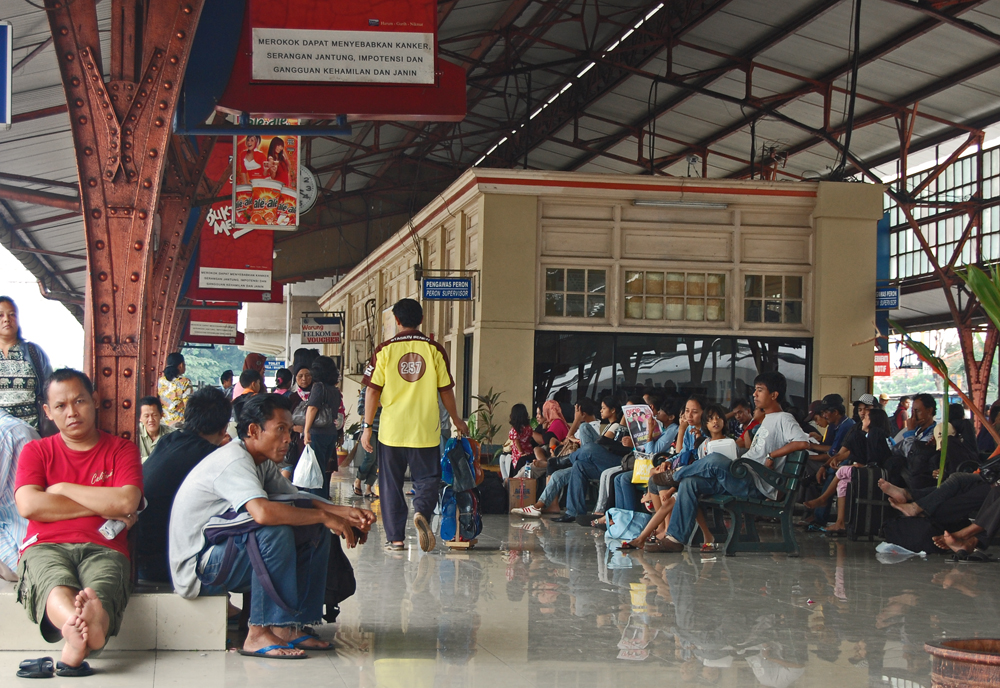
The east emplacement of Pasar Senen Station on 20 December 2009

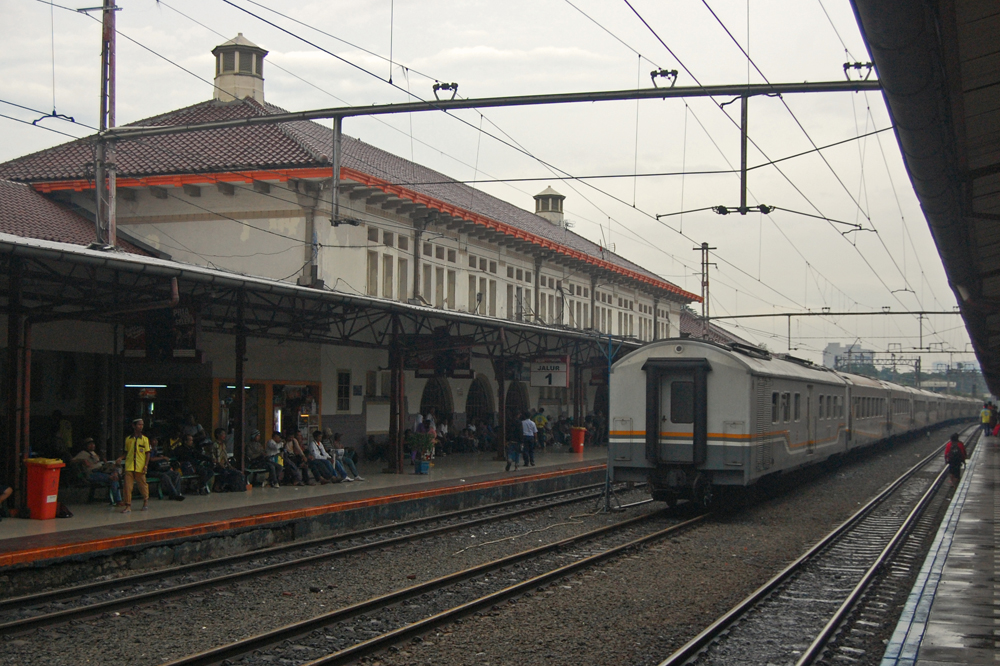
The platform of the station

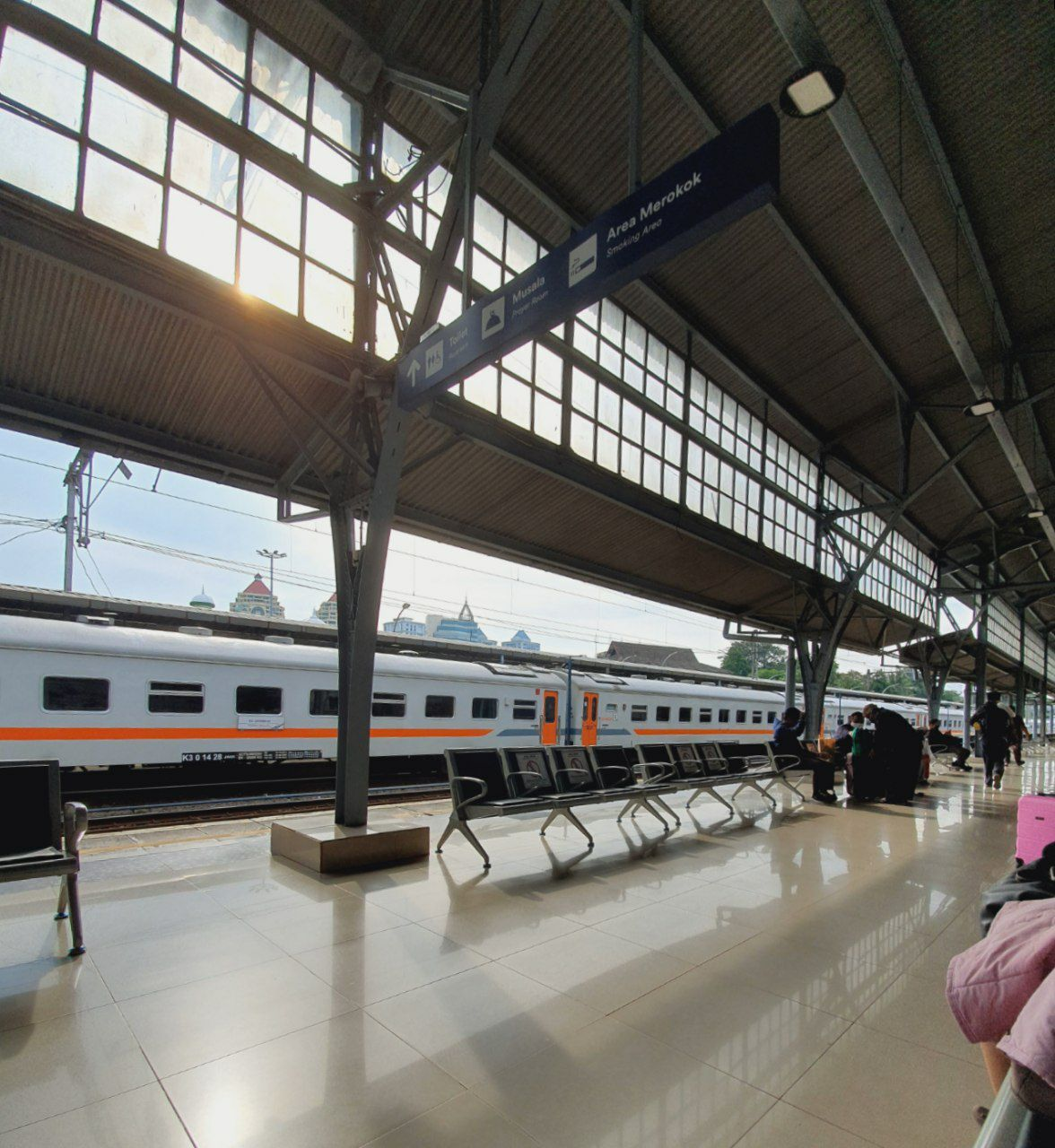
The waiting room of the station

== Cited works ==
- Sleeswijk, F.O.W. (12 January 1929). "Uitbreiding van de spoorwegen in en om Batavia en Tandjong Priok". De Ingenieur. No. 2.
- Sudarsih, A. (2014). "Pasar Senen (PSE): Tersibuk di Musim Mudik". Majalah KA. Vol. 97. pp. 16–17. ISSN 2087-9458.
- Unit Pusat Pelestarian dan Desain Arsitektur PT KAI (2014). "Riwayat Stasiun Pasar Senen". Majalah KA. Vol. 97. p. 18. ISSN 2087-9458.

Preceding station	Kereta Api Indonesia	Following station
Kemayoran towards Rajawali	Rajawali–Cikampek	Gang Sentiong towards Cikampek
