= Malioboro Express =

Train service in Indonesia

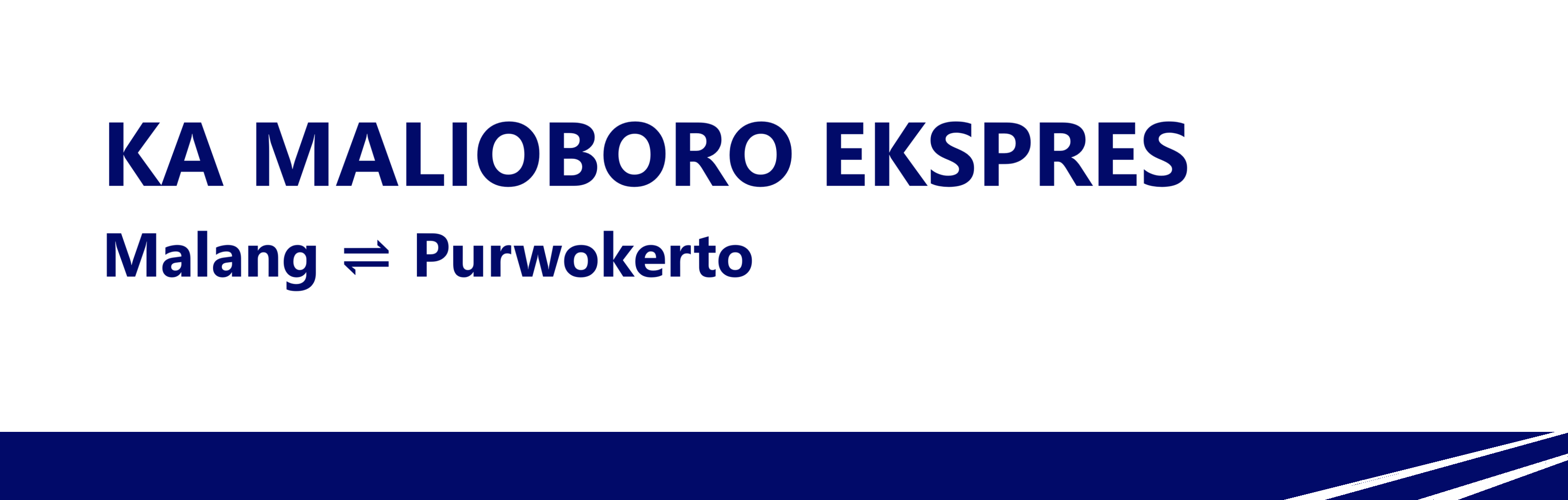

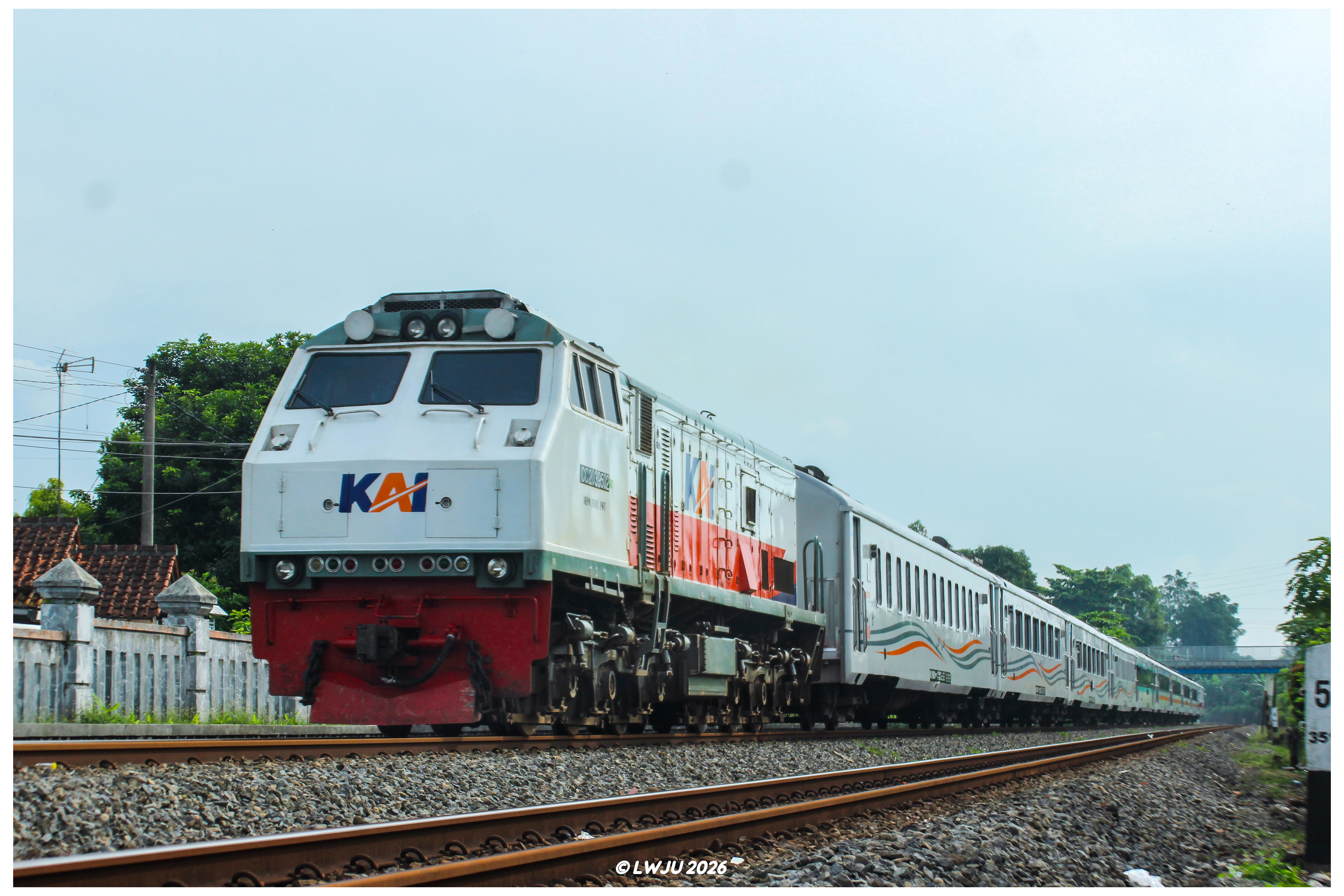
- Malioboro Express passing at West Purowkerto, 2026

Overview
- Service type: Inter-city rail
- Status: Operational
- Locale: Operational Area V Purwokerto
- First service: 21 September 2012
- Successor: Kertanegara (branding of the Malioboro Express 1)
- Current operator: Kereta Api Indonesia

Route
- Termini: Purwokerto; Malang
- Distance travelled: 559 kilometres (347 miles)
- Average journey time: 8 hours 52 minutes
- Service frequency: daily each way
- Train number: 169-170

On-board services
- Classes: economy and executive
- Seating arrangements: 50 seats arranged 2-2 (executive class); 80 seats arranged 2-2 (economy class)
- Catering facilities: On-board cafe and trolley service

Technical
- Rolling stock: CC206; CC203; CC201
- Track gauge: 1,067 mm
- Operating speed: 70–120 kilometres per hour (43–75 mph)
Route map
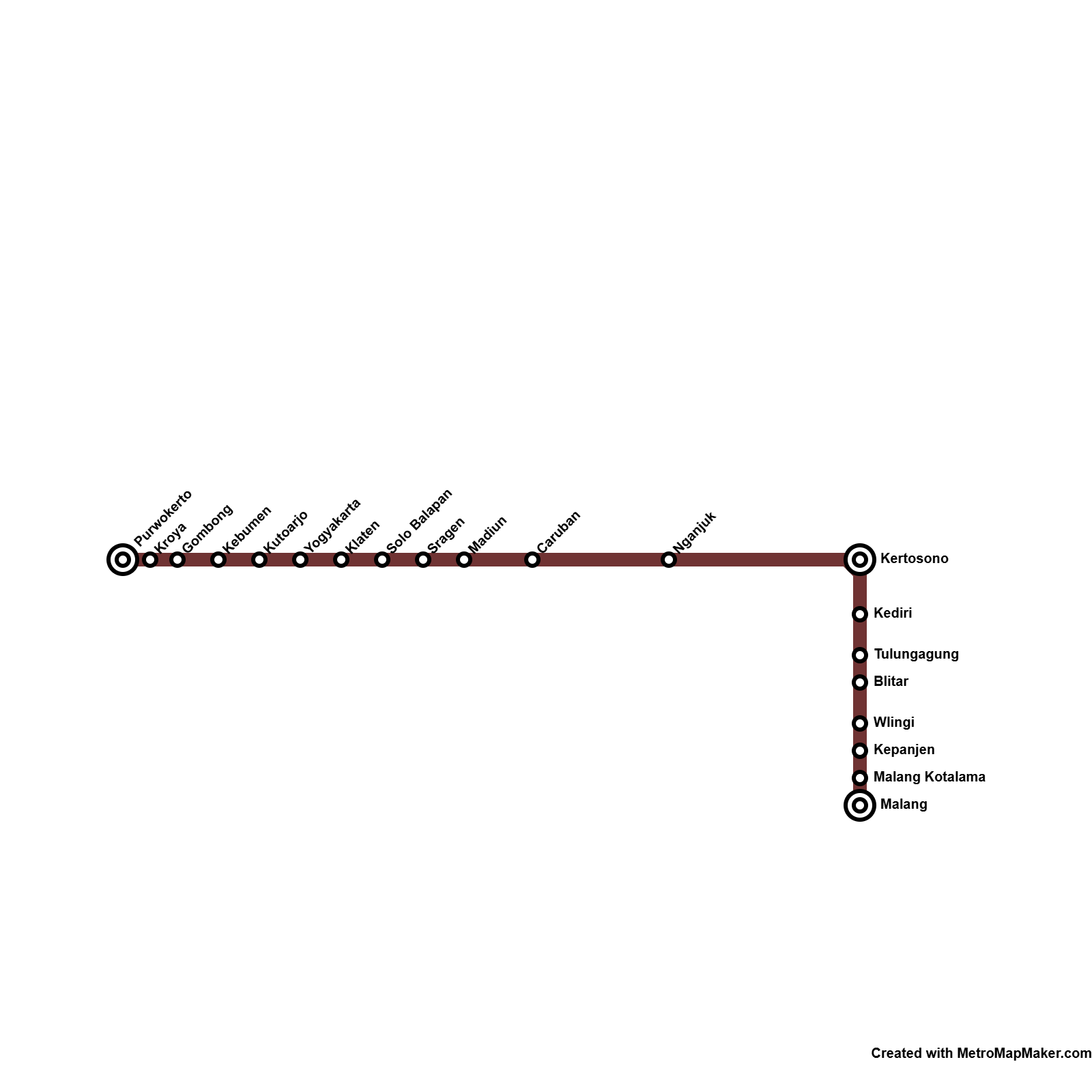

Malioboro Express is an executive and economy train service operated by Kereta Api Indonesia which between Purwokerto and Malang via Yogyakarta.

The name of this train is taken from Jalan Malioboro, one of the famous streets in Yogyakarta which is close to Yogyakarta station.

== History ==
The Malioboro Express was first time operation on 21 September 2012 with the executive and plus economy class. Due to high passenger occupancy, the number of train trips was increased to two trips per day starting 23 January 2015.

=== 2012-2020 ===
The Malioboro Express initially served the Ministry of Transportation's economy and executive classes, but sometimes the Ministry of Transportation's economy class was replaced with business class.

=== 2021-Present ===
With the implementation of the enactment of new train travel chart 2021 on 10 February 2021, this train's status changed to optional due to the operation of the Kertanegara train on the Malang-Purwokerto round trip route.

When it resumed operations for the 2022 Christmas and New Year holidays and the 2023 Eid al-Fitr holiday season (Nataru) after a nearly two-year hiatus due to the COVID-19 pandemic, this train changed its service class to premium economy, using stainless steel-bodied vehicles.

According to the enactment of new train travel chart 2023, the Malioboro Express train's route was extended from Yogyakarta-Malang round trip to Purwokerto-Malang round trip. This train is the preferred choice for people traveling from Purwokerto to Malang in the morning and vice versa in the evening.

During the 2023 Christmas and New Year 2024 holiday season, this train will again change classes to executive and business class.

During the 2024 Eid al-Fitr holiday period, this train changed its class to "new image" economy and "new image" executive; in line with its brother train, the Kertanegara train, which also serves the same class.

Starting 14 May 2024, the Malioboro Express will use light steel frames with "new image" executive and economy class services, inherited from the Malabar train. The current Malioboro Express consists of one power car, four to four executive cars, one dining car, and four new image economy cars, which have been converted back to regular train status.

== Stations ==
Here's route of the Malioboro Express in 2025:

- Purwokerto (start/end)
- Kroya
- Gombong
- Kebumen
- Kutoarjo
- Yogyakarta
- Klaten
- Solo Balapan
- Sragen
- Madiun
- Caruban
- Nganjuk
- Kertosono
- Kediri
- Tulungagung
- Blitar
- Wlingi
- Kepanjen
- Malang Kotalama
- Malang (start/end)

== Incident ==
On 19 May 2025, the Malioboro Express heading to Malang hit seven motorcycles between Magetan–Geneng, Mangge, West, Magetan, East Java. As a result, 4 people were reported dead and others injured. The incident began when the Matarmaja train passed first at the JPL 08 crossing. After the train passed, the crossing gate was opened and several motorcycles passed. However, from the opposite direction, the 170 Malioboro Express from Purwokerto–Malang appeared, which ended up hitting the vehicles that were about to pass and were already on the tracks.

== See also ==
- Singasari (train)
