= Solo Balapan–Kertosono–Surabaya Gubeng railway =

Rail line in East Java, Indonesia

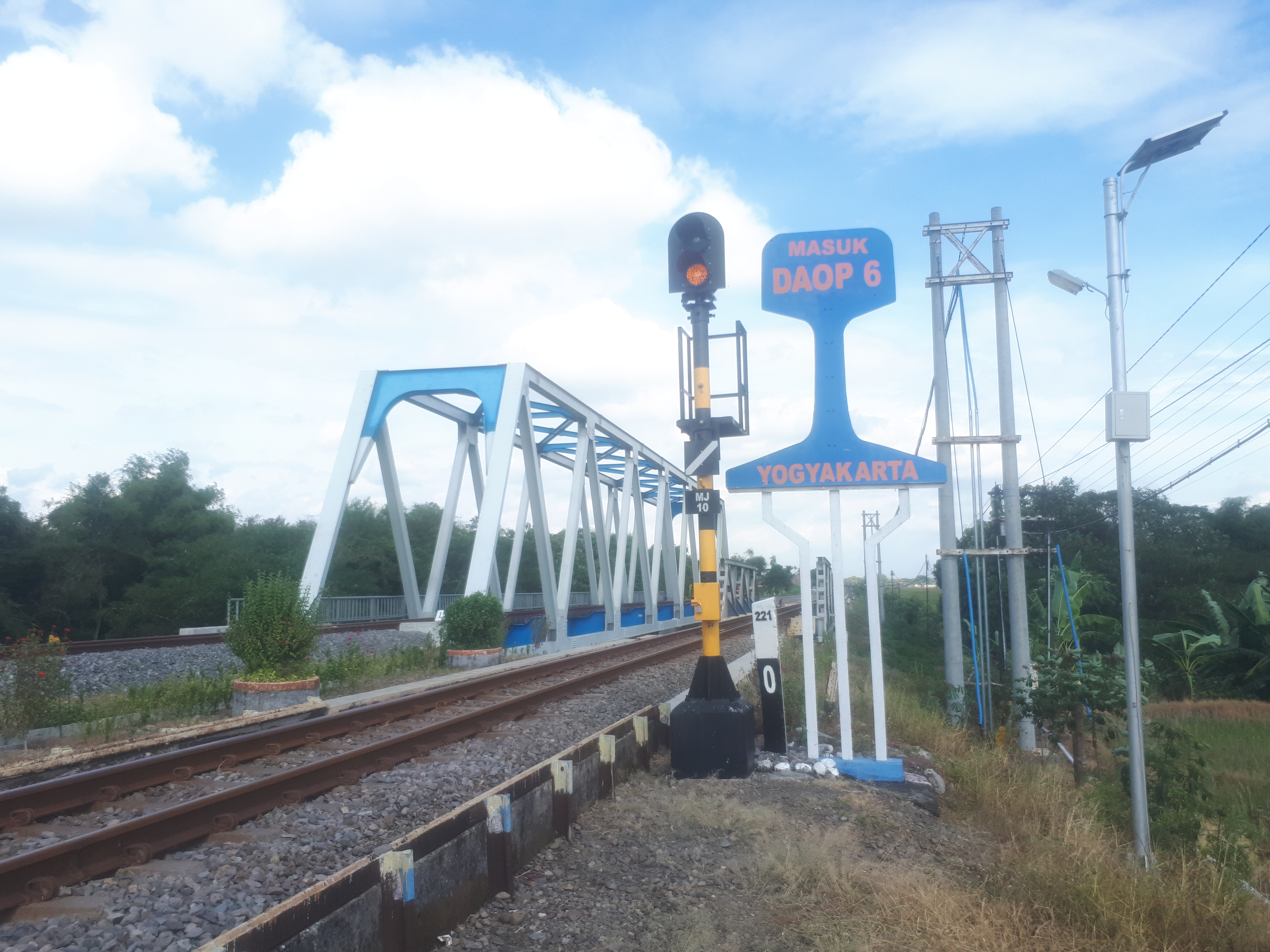
- Border of Operational Area VII Madiun and Operational Area VI Yogyakarta, 2020

Overview
- Native name: Jalur kereta api Solo Balapan–Kertosono–Surabaya Gubeng
- Status: Operational
- Owner: Directorate General of Railways (DJKA)
- Locale: Surakarta, Central Java - Surabaya, East Java
- Termini: Solo Balapan; Surabaya Gubeng
- Stations: 40

Service
- Type: Inter-city rail and Commuter rail
- Operator: PT Kereta Api Indonesia

History
- Opened: 1880-1884

Technical
- Number of tracks: 2
- Track gauge: 1,067 mm (3 ft 6 in)
- Electrification: 1.5 kV DC OHC (only Solo Balapan–Palur segment)

Solo Balapan–Kertosono–Surabaya Gubeng railway is a corridor railway line in Southern Java which connecting between Solo Balapan and Surabaya Gubeng via Kertosono. This line as a busiest southern railway line that from Jakarta, Bandung, and Yogyakarta bound to Surabaya.

The Solo Balapan–Surabaya Gubeng route is a busy one because it serves as an intersection between the southern and northern routes of Java Island, connecting Jakarta or West Java with Central Java, Yogyakarta, and East Java, although the main route from Jakarta to Surabaya is the northern route of Java Island via Semarang.

The Solo Balapan line to the Sragen–Ngawi border is included in Operational Area VI Yogyakarta, the section between the Sragen–Ngawi border to Curahmalang is included in Operational Area VII Madiun, while the Mojokerto section is included in Operational Area VIII Surabaya. This line is entirely double track and is on a flat track, with a few hilly sections around Saradan District until entering Wilangan District. This line is built by the Semarang Class I Railway Engineering Center on the Solo Balapan–Kedungbanteng segment and the Surabaya Class I Railway Engineering Center on the Walikukun–Surabaya Gubeng segment.

Effective from 1 December 2019, two stations on this route (Barat and Paron) have changed their names to Magetan and Ngawi respectively.

== History ==
=== Began Construction ===
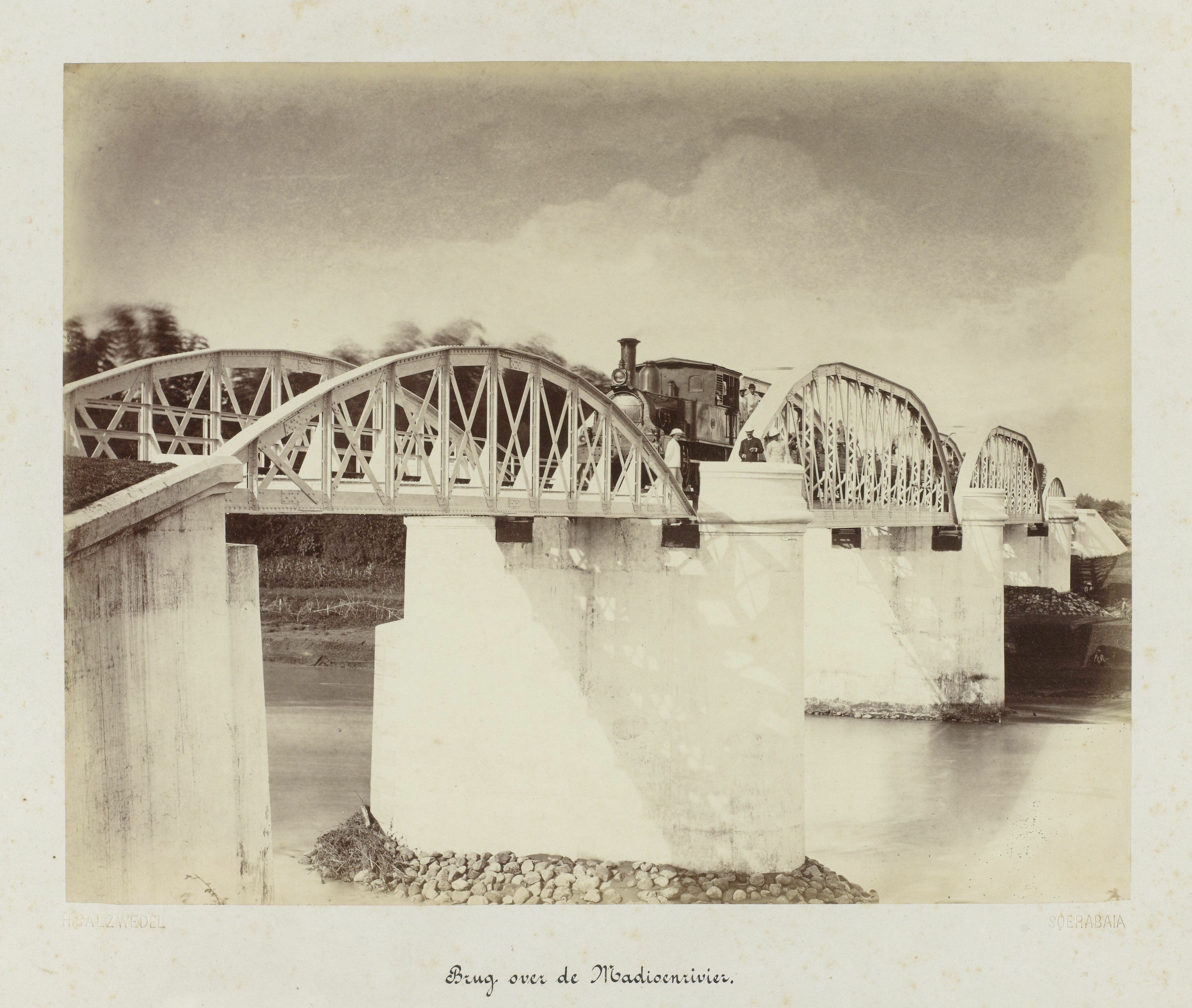
Bengawan Madiun railway bridge in 1880s

In the early 1830s, precisely after the Diponegoro War, the Madiun was controlled by the Dutch East Indies government and became a residency area and became a place of residence for Dutch and other Europeans, especially those who worked in the plantation and industrial sectors due to the development of various plantations and factories around the city, such as sugar cane plantations with sugar factories, tea plantations, coffee, tobacco, and others.

The agricultural and plantation industries were growing in the Madiun region. To support the distribution of these agricultural products, an integrated transportation system was needed—especially in the railway sector. In 1873, the Dutch East Indies government issued plans for a railway line between Surabaya Kota and Solo Jebres and the Madiun–Ponorogo railway.

Its construction required state involvement, and was ultimately undertaken by the Staatsspoorwegen (SS), the Dutch East Indies government-owned railway company. David Maarschalk, the first Head of the SS Department, was a central figure in the SS's first projects, namely the Surabaya–Pasuruan, Bangil–Malang, Bogor–Cicalengka, Sidoarjo–Madiun Solo, and Kertosono–Bangil lines. When the Surabaya–Pasuruan line began operations on 16 May 1878, Maarschalk was praised for his skill and decisiveness in carrying out the project. His masterpiece was built simply, but with sturdy materials, on time, and without cost overruns. After the success of this route, Maarschalk made a detailed engineering design (DED) for the next routes, namely Bogor–Bandung (which had been initiated in 1876) and Cilacap–Bandung.

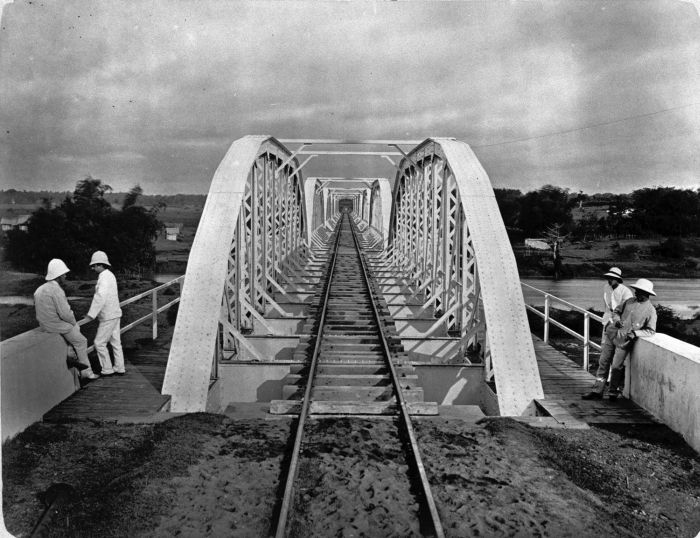
Bengawan Solo railway bridge, Jurug

To realize this connection, the railway line started from Sidoarjo–Tarik railway line to Mojokerto which was completed on 16 October 1880. Next, the line was extended again to Sembung on 27 February 1881. This line arrived at Kertosono on 25 June 1881. Next was the line from Kertosono to Nganjuk which was inaugurated on 1 October 1881 and Nganjuk to Madiun on 1 July 1882.

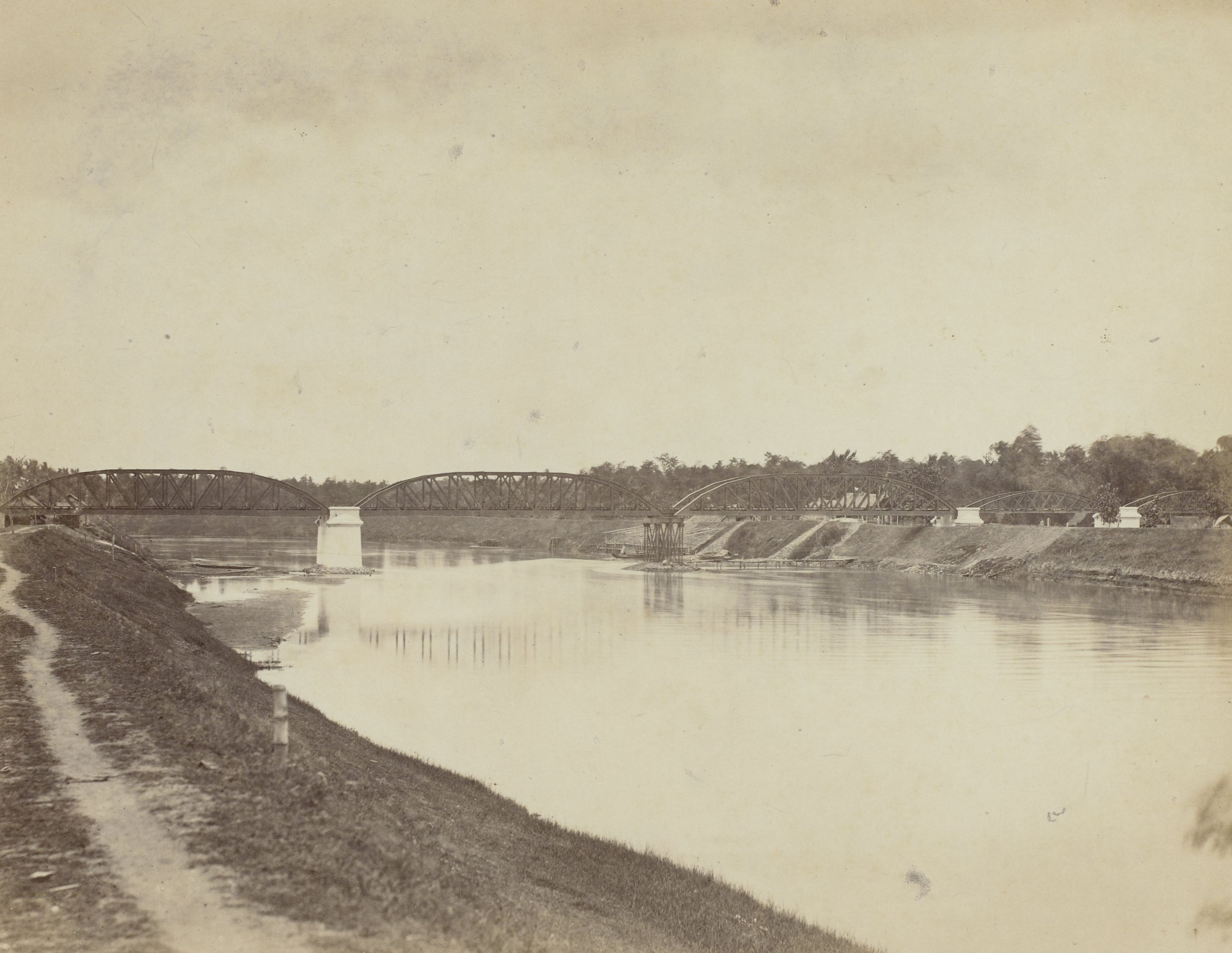
Old Photos the Keling railway bridge that located in the Mojokerto–Tarik section

A second concession was proposed for the Madiun–Solo segment. On 25 May 1880, the law that formed the legal basis for the line was passed. Maarschalk was satisfied with the bill for the construction of the line, as it received 50 votes in favor and 8 against in the Tweede Kamer. However, at the same time, he declared himself unable to continue the project, and on 15 November 1880, he retired and was succeeded by his then Technical Director, H.G. Derx. Derx carried out the continuation of the concession with great enthusiasm. Finally, this line was opened: Madiun–Paron on 2 July 1883, Paron–Sragen on 1 March 1884, and finally connected to Solo Jebres and Solo Balapan on 24 May 1884. With the completion of these lines, the Solo–Surabaya connection by train was finally realized.

Initially, trains departed from Surabaya to Solo via Sidoarjo and then Tulangan. As railway lines in Java developed, SS then added a new section of track, namely the Tarik–Surabaya Gubeng shortcut, 43,4 kilometers long. The plan to build this line was opposed by the Oost-Java Stoomtram Maatschappij (OJS) because it was considered to disrupt their business. The OJS's opposition was conveyed to the government on 29 November 1892. However, in the end, Staatsspoorwegen received approval to build the Tarik–Wonokromo railway line then continued to Surabaya Gubeng through Government Decree Number 31 which was promulgated on 12 October 1893 concerning the General Plan for Railways on the Island of Java, then strengthened by a law issued on 20 July 1895 (Staatsblad No. 212). The Tarik–Sepanjang segment was completed on 1 July 1897. On 1 December 1898, the line was connected to the Surabaya–Pasuruan main line at.

=== Double track project ===
==== Double track Surabaya Gubeng–Tarik (1923–1942) ====
In the newspaper Deli Courant of 27 January 1912, SS announced that the stations on this line: Sepanjang, Tarik, Krian, Mojokerto, and Jombang, would have their yards expanded. This was aimed at increasing the line's capacity, in connection with the planned operation of night express trains. The arrival of these night express trains could have an impact on increasing daytime traffic. The construction of a double-track railway in this period wasn't urgent, although SS still left open the possibility that the double track project would be realized.

In 1917, the idea of building a new line on the SS Eastern Line emerged. The purpose of this new line was to increase the line's capacity, in response to the increasing production at the Gempolkerep Sugar Factory, coupled with the introduction of night shifts at the factory. Two solutions emerged:

- Complete double-track construction from Surabaya Gubeng to Kertosono.
- Double-track construction from Wonokromo to Krian, then connected to the existing Krian–Ploso railway line and continued to Kertosono Station.

However, in the end, the second option was chosen. The construction of the Gempolkerep–Kertosono line was based on Indische Staatsblad No. 345 which was published on 1 June 1918. For the first stage, the SS decided to extend the line from Gempolkerep Station to Ploso Station first. On 1 September 1921, the 20 km Gempolkerep–Ploso section of the line began operation. Unfortunately, the Ploso–Kertosono railway line was canceled so that this line only ended in Ploso.

Double-track construction continued during this period; this time, the line ended at Tarik. At the same time, the Meester Cornelis (Jatinegara)–Cikampek and Padalarang–Kiaracondong double-track lines were also constructed. By February 1923, the double-track project was still underway, and the SS planned to complete the line as soon as possible.

In the final report of the SS in 1923, the double track was operational, along with other lines built that year. However, the Surabaya Kota–Wonokromo segment wasn't yet completed, as the Kali Jagir railway bridge hadn't yet been built. In November 1924, SS plans to expand the Wonokromo Station emplacement, in connection with the planned construction of a double track to Sidoarjo Station. There was a re-emergence of the idea of extending the double track to Kertosono, but SS management stated that they were postponing the project.

The double track was dismantled in the 1940s by romusa workers and the section was returned to single-track railway.

==== Double track southern Java railway line (2015-Present) ====
This railway line was gradually upgraded to a double track by the Directorate General of Railways (DJKA), through the Central Java Railway Engineering Center (now BTP Class I Semarang) on the Solo Balapan–Kedungbanteng segment and the East Java Railway Engineering Center (now BTP Class I Surabaya). This double track was built because it had a fairly high traffic flow. The construction of this double track has been planned in Phase II and Phase III of the National Railway Master Plan issued by the Directorate General of Railways in 2018.

The operating dates for the double track segments on this railway route are divided as follows:

- Solo Balapan–Jombang
  - Solo Balapan–Solo Jebres, on 7 October 2020.
  - Solo Jebres–Palur, on 20 August 2019.
  - Palur–Kedungbanteng, on 5 March 2019.
  - Kedungbanteng–Geneng, on 30 November 2019.
  - Geneng–Babadan, on 16 October 2019
  - Babadan–Nganjuk, on 30 April 2019
  - Nganjuk–Baron, on 14 March 2019
  - Baron–Jombang, on 30 October 2019
  - Jombang–Mojokerto, on 26 October 2020
- Mojokerto–Wonokromo
  - Mojokerto–Sepanjang, on 1 December 2023,
  - Sepanjang–Wonokromo is currently under construction.

The first double track to operate was on the Palur–Kedungbanteng route since 5 March 2019, then the Nganjuk–Baron crossing since 14 March 2019 by the Surabaya Railway Engineering Center. This line is now fully double track as the double track operation on the Solo Jebres–Solo Balapan route started on 7 October 2020.

== Service ==
Here's train that passing the Solo Balapan-Surabaya Gubeng railway line:

=== Passenger ===
==== Inter-city rail ====
Southern Java railway
Train name	Route
Executive
Argo Wilis	Bandung–Surabaya Gubeng
Turangga	Bandung–Surabaya Gubeng
Argo Semeru	Gambir–Surabaya Gubeng
Bima	Gambir–Surabaya Gubeng
Gajayana	Gambir–Malang
Executive-Premium Economy
Sancaka	Yogyakarta–Surabaya Gubeng
Madiun Jaya	Pasar Senen–Madiun
Mutiara Selatan	Bandung–Surabaya Gubeng
Malabar	Bandung–Malang
Wijayakusuma	Cilacap–Surabaya Gubeng–Banyuwangi
Sangkuriang	Bandung–Ketapang
Executive-Economy
Kertanegara	Purwokerto–Malang
Malioboro Express	Purwokerto–Malang
Bangunkarta	Pasar Senen–Jombang
Ranggajati	Cirebon–Surabaya Gubeng–Jember
Gaya Baru Malam Selatan	Pasar Senen–Surabaya Gubeng
Singasari	Pasar Senen–Blitar
Premium Economy
Logawa	Purwokerto–Surabaya Gubeng–Banyuwangi
Jayakarta	Pasar Senen–Surabaya Gubeng
Economy
Sri Tanjung	Lempuyangan–Surabaya Kota–Banyuwangi
Pasundan	Kiaracondong–Surabaya Gubeng
Kahuripan	Kiaracondong–Blitar

Northern Java railway
Train name	Route
Executive
Brawijaya	Gambir–Semarang Tawang–Malang
Pandalungan	Gambir–Semarang Tawang–Surabaya Pasar Turi–Jember
Executive-Economy
Brantas	Pasar Senen–Semarang Tawang–Blitar
Jayabaya	Pasar Senen–Semarang Tawang–Surabaya Pasar Turi–Malang
Blambangan Express	Pasar Senen–Semarang Tawang–Surabaya Pasar Turi–Ketapang
Economy
Majapahit	Pasar Senen–Semarang Tawang–Malang
Matarmaja	Pasar Senen–Semarang Poncol–Malang

Eastern Java railway
Train name	Route
Executive
Mutiara Timur	Surabaya Gubeng–Jember–Ketapang
Executive-Economy
Mutiara Timur	Surabaya Pasar Turi–Jember–Ketapang
Economy
Probowangi	Surabaya Gubeng–Jember–Ketapang

==== Railway airport ====
Train name	Route	
BIAS	Adisoemarmo International Airport	Madiun

==== Commuter and Local ====
Train name	Route	
KAI Commuter Yogyakarta Line	Yogyakarta	Palur

Train name	Route
Dhoho Commuter Line	Surabaya Kota–Blitar via Kertosono
Dhoho Commuter Line	Surabaya Kota–Kertosono
Commuter Line Jenggala	Mojokerto–Surabaya Gubeng–Indro/Babat
Commuter Line Jenggala	Mojokerto–Sidoarjo–Indro

=== Freight ===
Train name	Route	
Southern Java railway
BBM Pertamina Cargo	Madiun	Benteng
BBM Pertamina Cargo	Madiun	Rewulu
Overnight train service Parcel Southern Parcel	Bandung	Surabaya Kota
Overnight train service Parcel Middle Parcel	Kampung Bandan	Malang

== See also ==
- Yogyakarta–Solo Balapan railway
- Cilacap–Kroya–Yogyakarta railway
- Bandung–Surabaya line
