= Caruban railway station =

Railway station in Indonesia

Caruban Station Stasiun Caruban
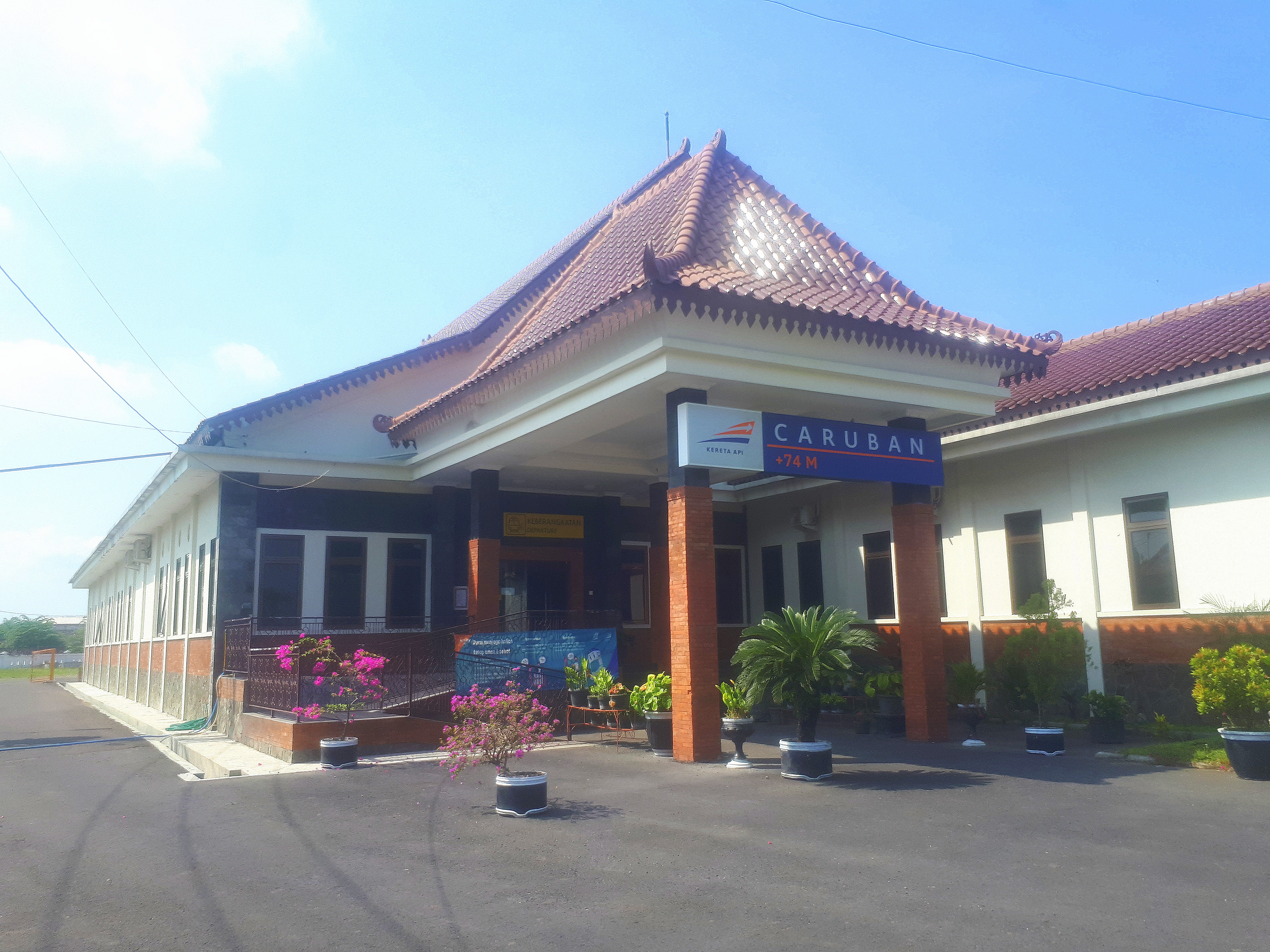
- The front view of Caruban railway station's new building, 2020

General information
- Location: Krajan, Mejayan, Madiun; East Java; Indonesia
- Coordinates: 7°33′4″S 111°39′16″E
- Elevation: +74 m (243 ft)
- System: Inter-city rail station
- Operator: Kereta Api Indonesia
- Line: Solo Balapan–Kertosono
- Platforms: 1 side platform 3 island platforms
- Tracks: 4

Construction
- Structure type: Ground
- Parking: Available
- Accessible: Available

Other information
- Station code: CRB
- Classification: Class II

History
- Rebuilt: 30 April 2019
Location
- Location within Java

Caruban Station (station code: CRB) is a class II railway station in Krajan, Mejayan, Madiun Regency, East Java, Indonesia, operated by Kereta Api Indonesia. The railway station's building has four tracks and has been in operation since the activiation of the Nganjuk–Babadan double track segment on 30 April 2019.

== Services ==
=== Passenger services ===
==== Executive class ====
- Bangunkarta, destination of Gambir via Solo Jebres–Semarang Tawang and Surabaya Gubeng
- Gajayana Fakultatif, destination of Gambir via Yogyakarta and Malang

==== Mixed class ====
- Singasari, destination of Pasar Senen via Yogyakarta–Purwokerto and Blitar (executive-economy)
- Gaya Baru Malam Selatan, destination of Pasar Senen via Lempuyangan and Surabaya Gubeng (executive-economy)
- Brantas, destination of Pasar Senen via Semarang Tawang and Blitar (executive-economy)
- Anjasmoro, destination of Pasar Senen via Lempuyangan–Purwokerto and Jombang (executive-economy)
- Sancaka Fakultatif, destination of Yogyakarta and Surabaya Gubeng
- Logawa, destination of Purwokerto via Surabaya Gubeng and Jember (business-economy)

==== Economy class ====
- Jayakarta, destination of Pasar Senen and Surabaya Gubeng
- Kahuripan, destination of Kiaracondong and Blitar
- Pasundan, destination of Kiaracondong and Surabaya Gubeng
- Sri Tanjung, destination of Lempuyangan and Ketapang via Surabaya Kota

== Gallery ==
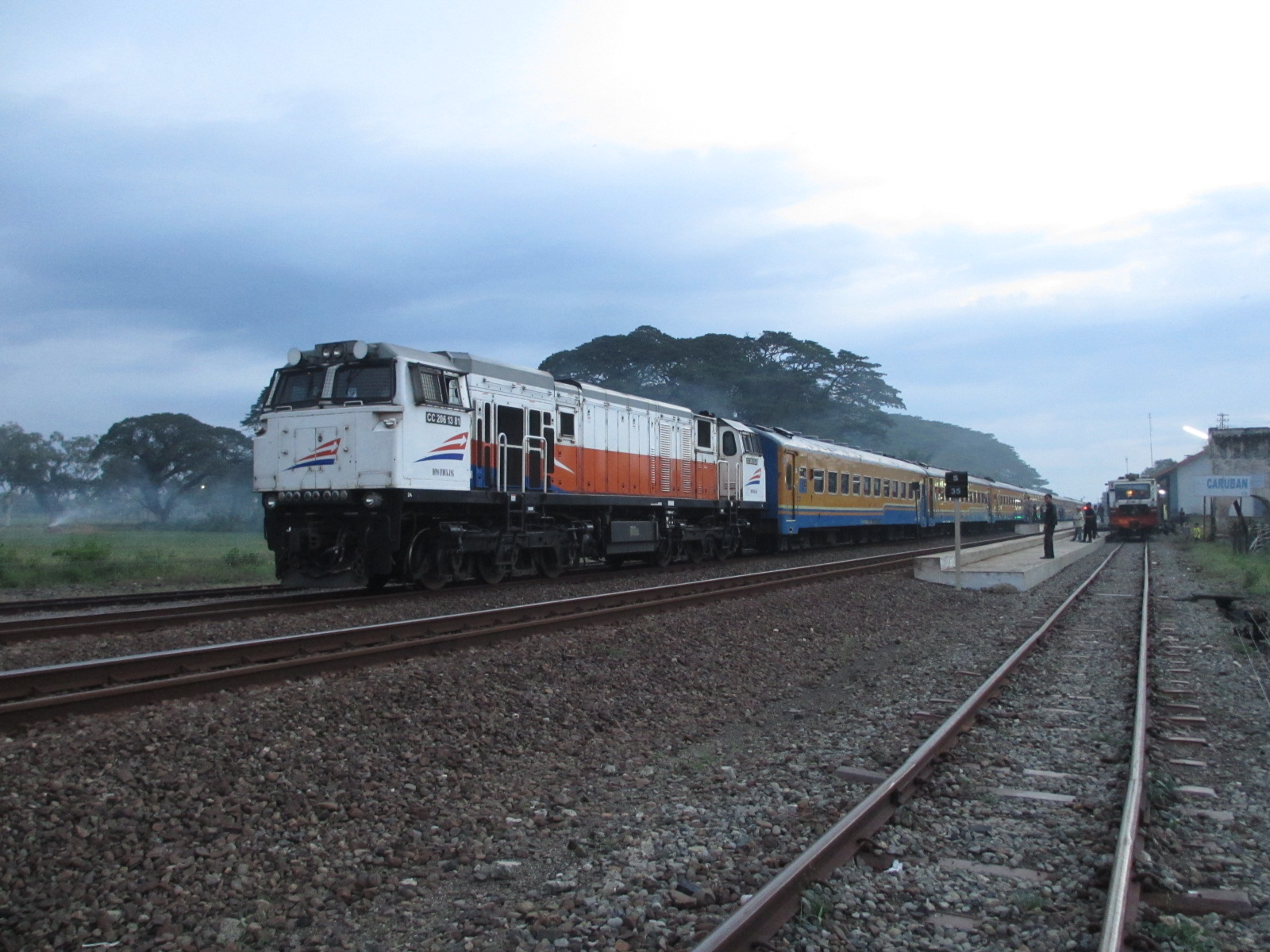
Pasundan stopping at Caruban railway station, 2015

Preceding station	Kereta Api Indonesia	Following station
Babadan towards Solo Balapan	Solo Balapan–Kertosono	Saradan towards Kertosono
