= Babadan railway station =

Railway station in Indonesia

Babadan Station Stasiun Babadan
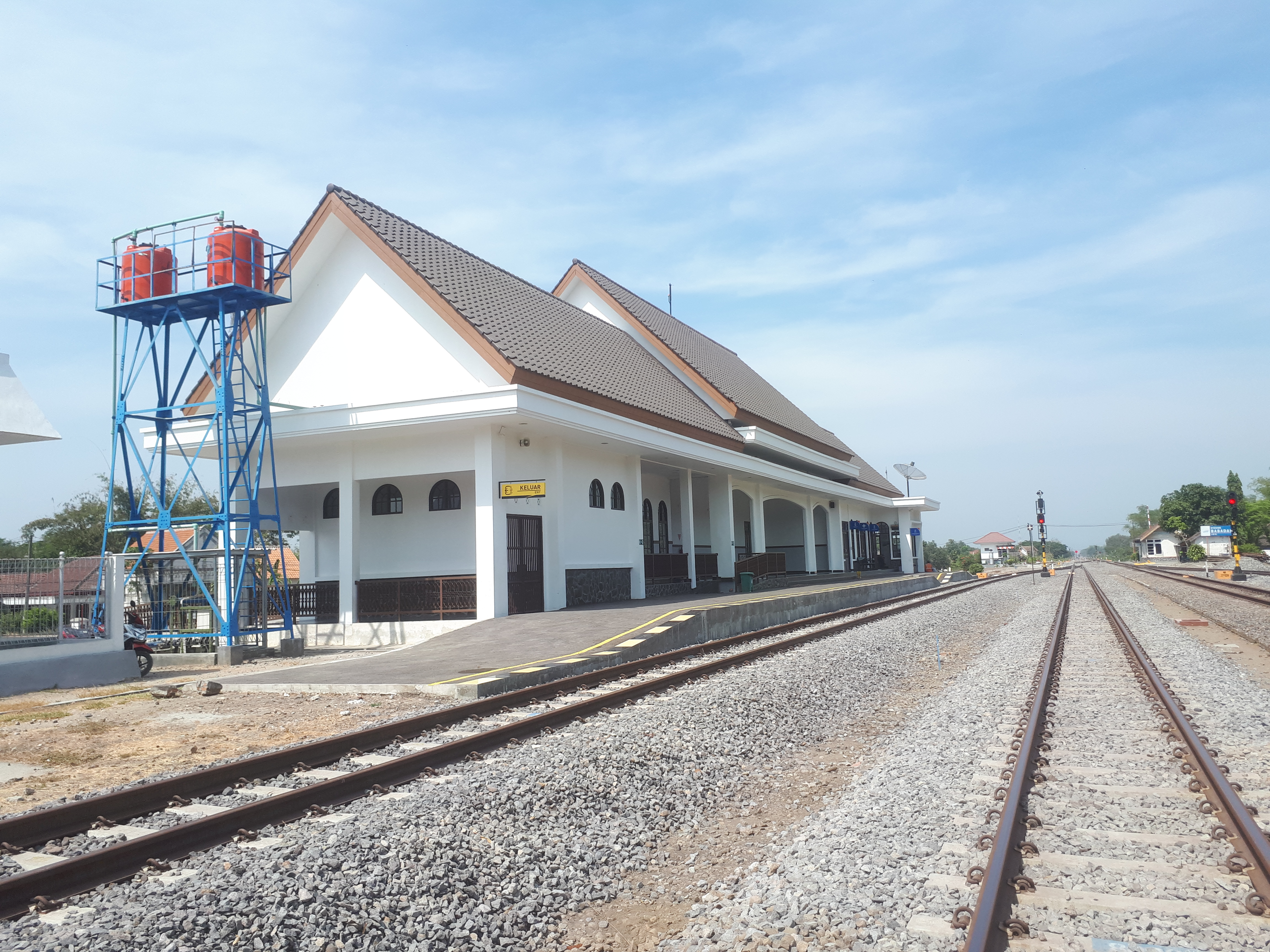
- The Babadan railway station's new building is operated on 30 April 2019

General information
- Location: Dimong, Madiun, Madiun Regency; East Java; Indonesia
- Coordinates: 7°35′12″S 111°35′22″E
- Elevation: +63 m (207 ft)
- Operator: Kereta Api Indonesia
- Line: Solo Balapan–Kertosono
- Platforms: 1 side platform 2 island platforms
- Tracks: 4

Construction
- Structure type: Ground
- Parking: Available
- Accessible: Available

Other information
- Station code: BBD
- Classification: Third-class station

History
- Rebuilt: 30 April 2019
Location
- Location within Java

Babadan Station (station code: BBD) is a third-class railway station in Dimong, Madiun, Madiun Regency, East Java, Indonesia, operated by Kereta Api Indonesia. This railway station is the southwesternmost railway station in the Madiun Regency. The station was built as part of the Nganjuk–Babadan double track segment activation on 30 April 2019 and Babadan–Geneng on 16 October 2019.

== Gallery ==
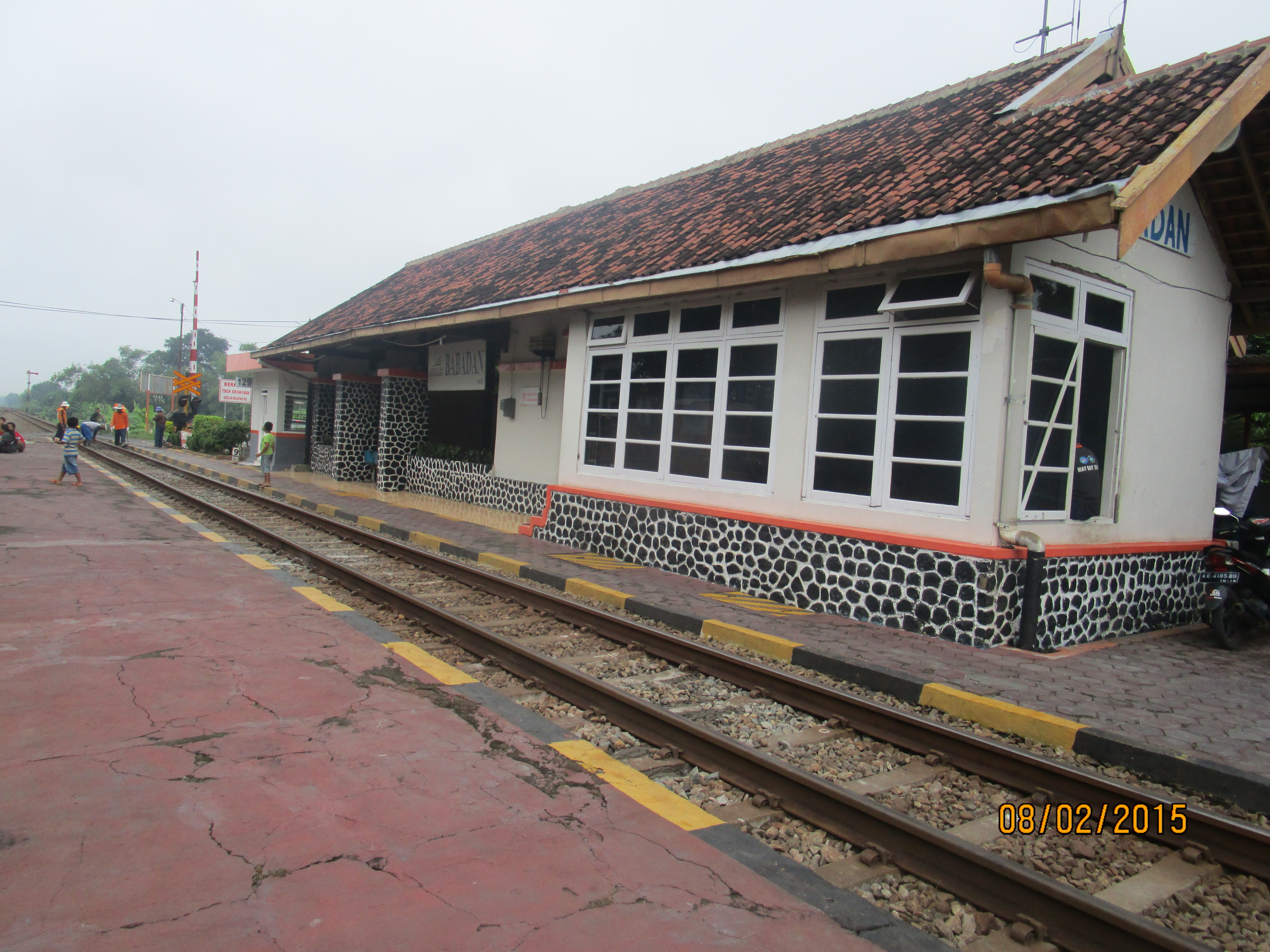
The Babadan railway station's old building has not been used since 30 April 2019

Preceding station	Kereta Api Indonesia	Following station
Madiun towards Solo Balapan	Solo Balapan–Kertosono	Caruban towards Kertosono
