= Sukomoro railway station =

Railway station in Indonesia

Sukomoro Station Stasiun Sukomoro
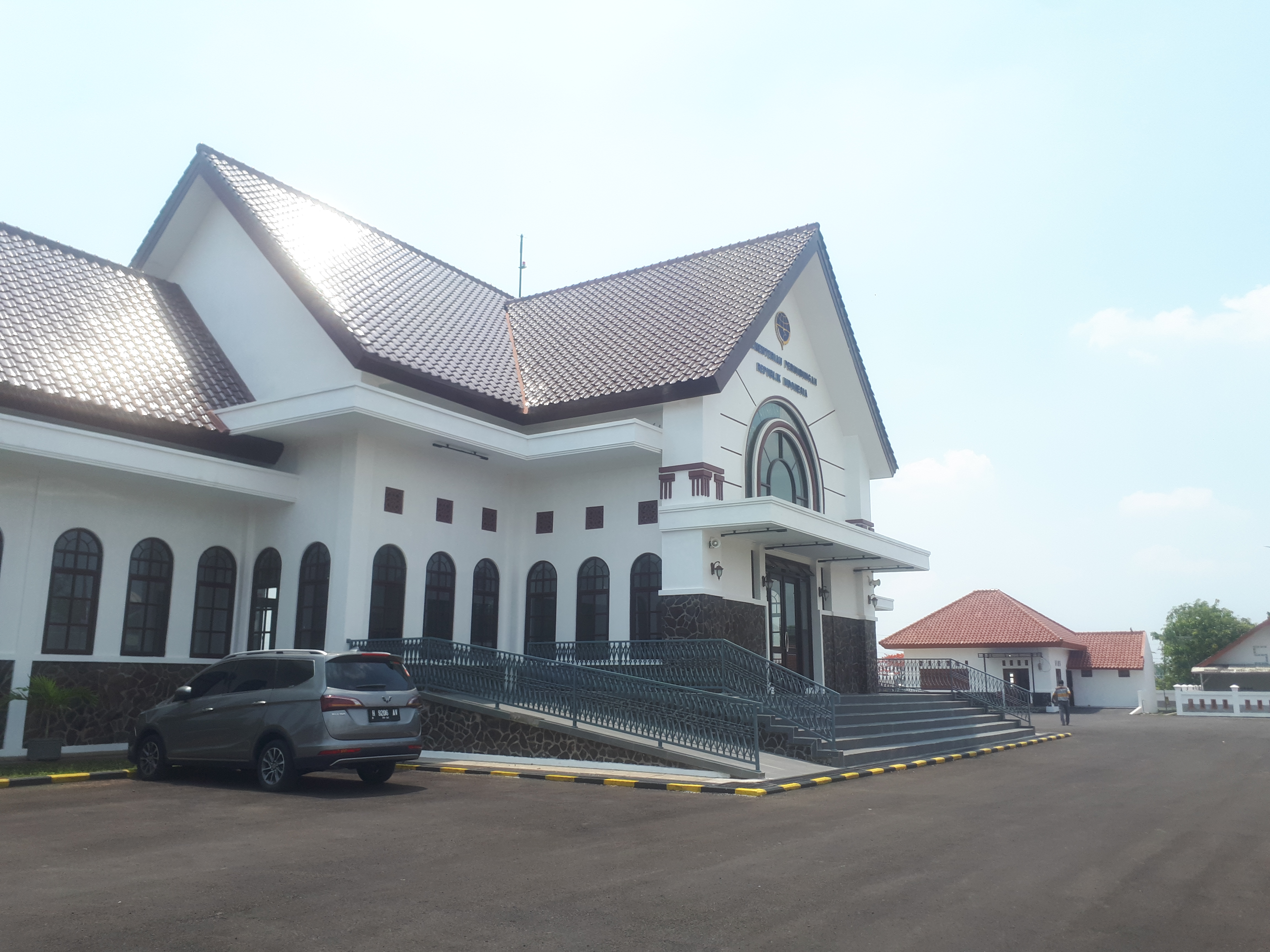
- Sukomoro railway station's new building, 2019

General information
- Location: Kertosono–Nganjuk Road; Sukomoro, Sukomoro, Nganjuk Regency; East Java; Indonesia
- Coordinates: 7°36′2″S 111°56′33″E
- Elevation: +50 m (160 ft)
- Operator: Kereta Api Indonesia
- Line: Solo Balapan–Kertosono
- Platforms: 1 side platform 2 island platforms
- Tracks: 4

Construction
- Structure type: Ground
- Parking: Available
- Accessible: Available

Other information
- Station code: SKM
- Classification: Third-class station

History
- Rebuilt: 14 March 2019
Location
- Location within Java

Sukomoro Station (station code: SKM) is a third-class railway station in Sukomoro, Sukomoro, Nganjuk Regency, East Java, Indonesia, operated by Kereta Api Indonesia. This station is located on Kertosono–Nganjuk Road and 200 m southwest of Pasar Bawang Merah Nganjuk ("Nganjuk garlic market" in Indonesian). This station's new building is operated—which has four tracks (two main lines and two passing tracks)—since Baron–Nganjuk double track segment activation on 14 March 2019.

== Services ==
This railway station has no train services except for train overtaking.

| Preceding station | Kereta Api Indonesia | Following station |
|---|---|---|
| Nganjuk towards Solo Balapan | Solo Balapan–Kertosono | Baron towards Kertosono |
