= Madiun railway station =

Railway station in Indonesia

Madiun Station Stasiun Madiun
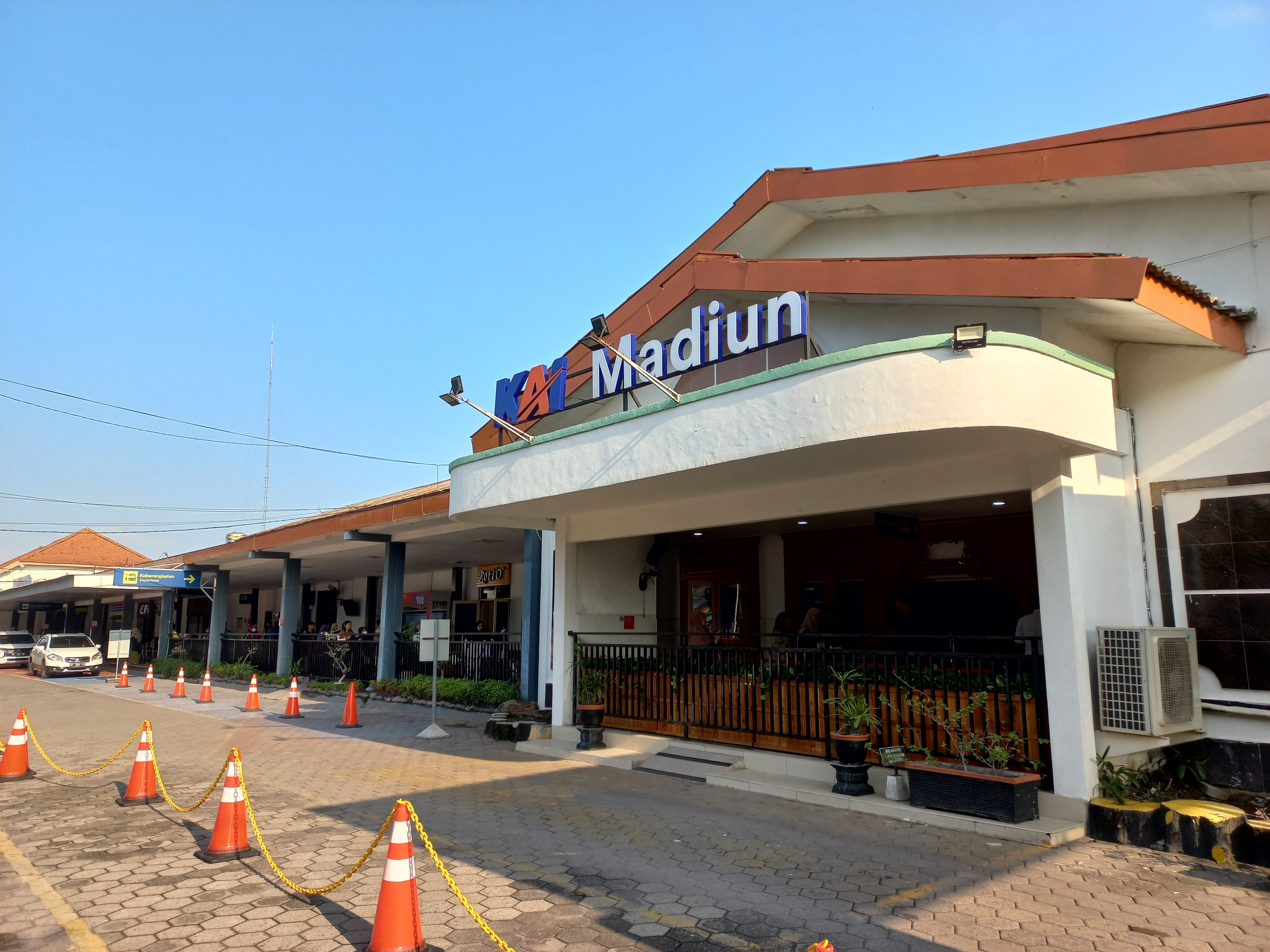
- Front view of the Station as of 2025

General information
- Location: Jl. Kompol Sunaryo 6A; Madiun Lor, Manguharjo, Madiun; East Java; Indonesia
- Coordinates: 7.618832899999999°S 111.5243802°E
- Elevation: +63 metres (207 ft)
- System: Inter-city rail
- Owner: Kereta Api Indonesia
- Operator: Kereta Api Indonesia
- Line: Solo Balapan–Kertosono
- Platforms: 1 side platform 2 island platforms
- Tracks: 8

Construction
- Structure type: Ground
- Parking: Available
- Accessible: Available

Other information
- Station code: MN
- Classification: Type-A major station

History
- Opened: 1 July 1882
Location
- Location within Java

Madiun Station (station code: MN) is a type-A major railway station in Madiun Lor, Mangunharjo, Madiun. This railway station located in Jalan Kompol Sunaryo 6A at an altitude of +63 m above sea level.

There are branching towards the rail depot owned by Pertamina before entering Madiun Station from the west—after the level crossings at Yos Sudarso Street. In the west of the station, there is a locomotive depot owned by Industri Kereta Api. In the south, there is a railway line which branches will end in Slahung, Ponorogo, but since 1992 the rail has been defunct.

Madiun Station is a one-side station in which the main building is located in line with railway train and emplacement The majority of station building both main building and emplacement has been renovated so that the whole view of this station evokes a modern nuance. At platform room a small remain of the elements of old building can be seen in the form of big dog in square shape. The lower part of the wall is layered with marble to minimize maintenance as it functions as public area.

== Services ==
=== Passenger services ===
==== Executive class ====
- Argo Wilis, destination of Bandung and Surabaya Gubeng
- Bima & Argo Semeru, destination of Gambir via Yogyakarta and Surabaya Gubeng
- Gajayana, destination of Gambir via Yogyakarta and Malang
- Brawijaya, destination of Gambir via Semarang Tawang and Malang
- Turangga, destination of Bandung and Surabaya Gubeng

==== Mixed class ====
- Mutiara Selatan, destination of Bandung and Surabaya Gubeng (executive-premium economy)
- Malabar, destination of Bandung and Malang (executive-business-economy plus)
- Singasari, destination of Pasar Senen via Lempuyangan and Blitar (executive-economy plus)
- Gaya Baru Malam Selatan, destination of Pasar Senen via Lempuyangan and Surabaya Gubeng (executive-economy plus)
- Brantas, destination of Pasar Senen via Semarang Tawang and Blitar (executive-economy)
- Ranggajati, destination of Cirebon and Jember
- Wijayakusuma, destination of Cilacap and Ketapang (executive-premium economy)
- Bangunkarta, destination of Pasar Senen via Yogyakarta and Jombang (executive-economy plus)
- Kertanegara, destination of Purwokerto and Malang (executive-economy plus)
- Malioboro Express, destination of Yogyakarta and Malang (executive-economy plus)
- Sancaka, destination of Yogyakarta and Surabaya Gubeng (executive-premium economy)
- Logawa, destination of Purwokerto and Jember (business-economy)
- Madiun Jaya train to Pasar Senen Station

==== Economy class ====
- Majapahit, destination of Pasar Senen via Semarang Tawang and Malang
- Jayakarta, destination of Pasar Senen via Lempuyangan and Surabaya Gubeng
- Matarmaja, destination of Pasar Senen via Semarang Tawang and Malang
- Kahuripan, destination of Kiaracondong and Blitar
- Pasundan, destination of Kiaracondong and Surabaya Gubeng
- Sri Tanjung, destination of Lempuyangan and Ketapang

=== Freight services ===
- Over Night Services, destination of Surabaya Kota and destination of:
  - Bandung via Yogyakarta-Kroya-Tasikmalaya
  - Jakarta Gudang via Lempuyangan-Purwokerto-Cirebon Prujakan
- Oil or Petroleum, destination and towards of Rewulu or Benteng

=== Airport train ===
- Adisumarmo Airport Rail Link to Adisumarmo Airport in Boyolali Regency, Central Java.

== Gallery ==
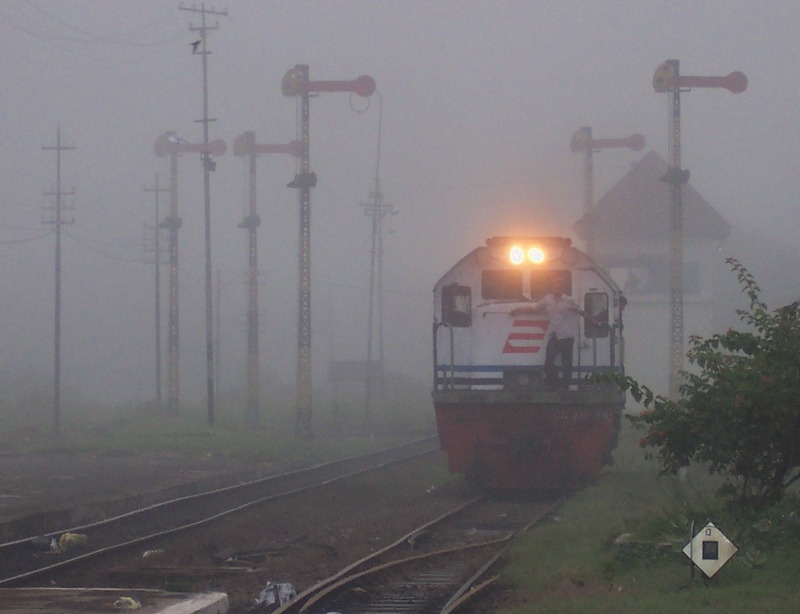
A diesel locomotive at Madiun Station, 2005

Preceding station	Kereta Api Indonesia	Following station
Magetan towards Solo Balapan	Solo Balapan–Kertosono	Babadan towards Kertosono
