= Bangunkarta =

Passenger train service in Indonesia

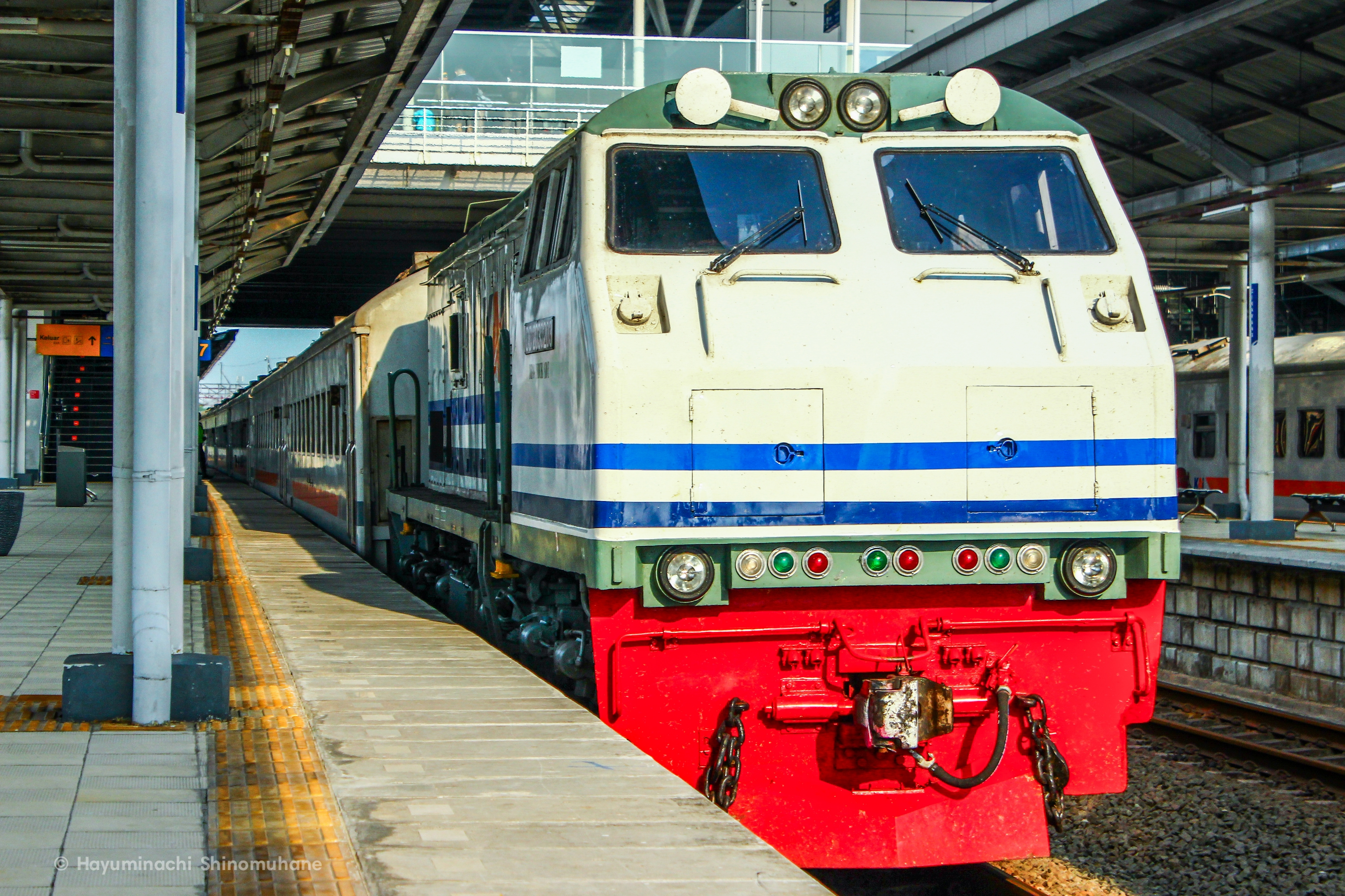
- Bangunkarta train with the CC203 WnB livery stopping at Cikarang, 2024

Overview
- Service type: Inter-city rail
- Status: Operational
- Predecessor: Tebuireng (train) (1985–2001); Anjasmoro (2019–2021, 2025 to divert the GMR-SBI route)
- First service: 10 January 1985; 41 years ago
- Current operator: Kereta Api Indonesia

Route
- Termini: Pasar Senen; Jombang
- Distance travelled: 751 km (467 mi)
- Average journey time: 11 hours 31 minutes
- Service frequency: once daily each way
- Train number: 161-162

On-board services
- Classes: executive, economy
- Seating arrangements: 50 seats arranged 2-2 (executive class); 72 seats arranged 2-2 (economy class)
- Catering facilities: On-board cafe and trolley service

Technical
- Rolling stock: CC206; CC203; CC201
- Track gauge: 1,067 mm (42 in)
- Operating speed: 75–100 km/h (47–62 mph)
Route map

Bangunkarta is an Indonesian passenger train, operated by Kereta Api Indonesia. It runs between Jakarta Pasar Senen and Jombang via Purwokerto, Yogyakarta, and Madiun.

The train runs daily each way between Jombang Regency and Jakarta.

The train's name is a portmanteau of the names of the cities and regencies that the train service passes through: Jombang, Madiun, and Jakarta.

== History ==
The Bangunkarta train was first run by KAI on 10 January 1985 between Jakarta and Jombang, as a replacement for the Tebuireng train economy class service. On 24 December 1994, the train service was upgraded to include business class service, and then ran only as business class from 1 August 1996.

On 5 December 2009, the Bangunkarta train service class was changed to only serve executive class, using former Gajayana trains.

On 17 December 2013, the Bangunkarta train route extended to Surabaya Gubeng via Solo Jebres and Semarang Tawang to meet/accommodate the people of Surabaya and surrounding areas who want to travel to Jakarta. The Bangunkarta train operation was transferred from Operation Area VII Madiun to Operation Area VIII Surabaya. Along with this change, the train set was transferred from the Madiun train Depot (MN) to the Sidotopo Train Depot (SDT) in Surabaya.

== Station ==
Stations on the Bangunkarta train route:

- Pasar Senen (Start/End)
- Jatinegara
- Bekasi
- Cikarang
- Pegadenbaru
- Haurgeulis
- Cirebon
- Bumiayu
- Purwokerto
- Kroya
- Sumpiuh
- Karanganyar
- Kebumen
- Kutowinangun
- Kutoarjo
- Yogyakarta
- Solo Balapan
- Sragen
- Ngawi
- Magetan
- Madiun
- Caruban
- Nganjuk
- Kertosono
- Jombang (Start/End)

== Incident ==
- On 2 May 2010, the Bangunkarta train collided with a Langsung Jaya bus, allegedly due to the negligence of the crossing guard. This incident resulted in five PT KAI employees being questioned by the police regarding the case.
- On 17 July 2013 at 04.04, the Bangunkarta train hit a truck loaded with rolled paper at km 234+540 of the Masaran–Sragen Station section, causing the truck to be dragged for approximately 100 meters and the load to be scattered in front of the locomotive, causing the driver and his assistant to be injured. This incident resulted in three trains being delayed and the cabin of the CC203 95 12 locomotive to be severely damaged, requiring repairs at the Yogyakarta Yasa Center.
- On 23 May 2015, at 18:50, the Bangunkarta train collided with KA 2502, a large pipe carrier, at Waruduwur Station. At the same time, a cement train had stopped on track 1. This incident resulted in a guard on KA 2502 suffering serious injuries to his leg.
- On 20 August 2018 at 15.30, the Bangunkarta train hit a car at a level crossing no barrier in Bulak Kapal, East Bekasi, Bekasi City, West Java which resulted in the car being severely damaged and the driver of the car died at the scene. According to eyewitnesses, this accident was caused by the car's engine suddenly dying at the crossing
- On 20 September 2025 after the crashes of the Mataram at 00.07 an early hours to morning, the 162 Bangunkarta train crashed with the car in Indramayu Regency the causing 2 people in the car were injure and some train were delayed.
- On 4 November 2025, the 161 Bangunkarta and 77 Lodaya train were accident in the Brambanan-Maguwo section, the Lodaya train hitting the one of the pedestrian in the level crossing no gates at 07.55 local time, while the Bangunkarta train collision with motorcycle and car in the level crossing with the gates at 10.35 local time that killing 3 drivers. As a result, 4 people were dead the crashes by the Lodaya and Bangunkarta train in different location.
- On 6 April 2026, the 161 Bangunkarta train derailed in Bumiayu-Linggapura section when the train departure from Bumiayu causing some train in Prupuk-Purwokerto section delayed for evacuate of economy 1, 2, 3, and 4 coaches were derailed at the time.

== Gallery ==
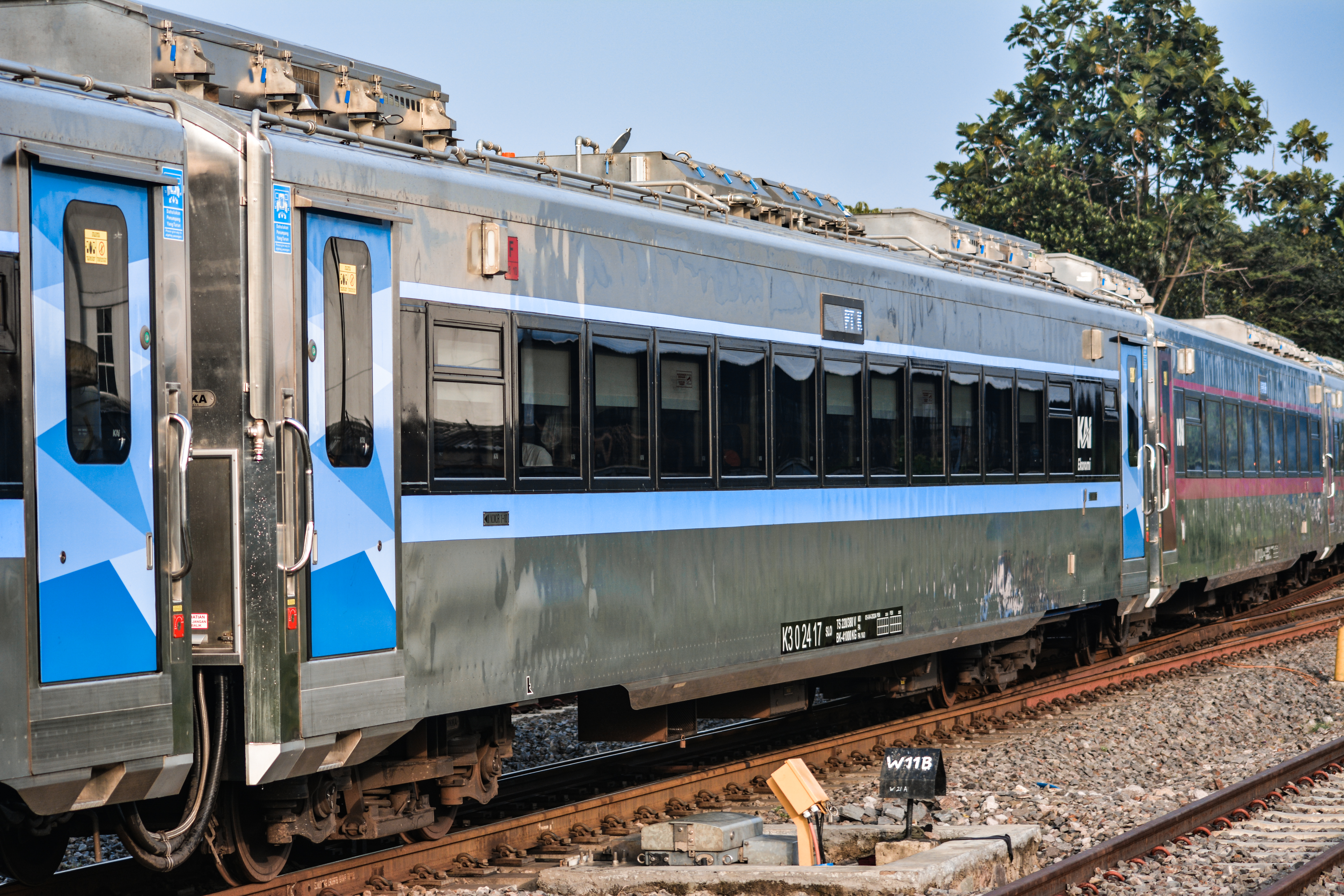
Economy New Generation Stainless Steel used by the Bangunkarta and Singasari train since 2026

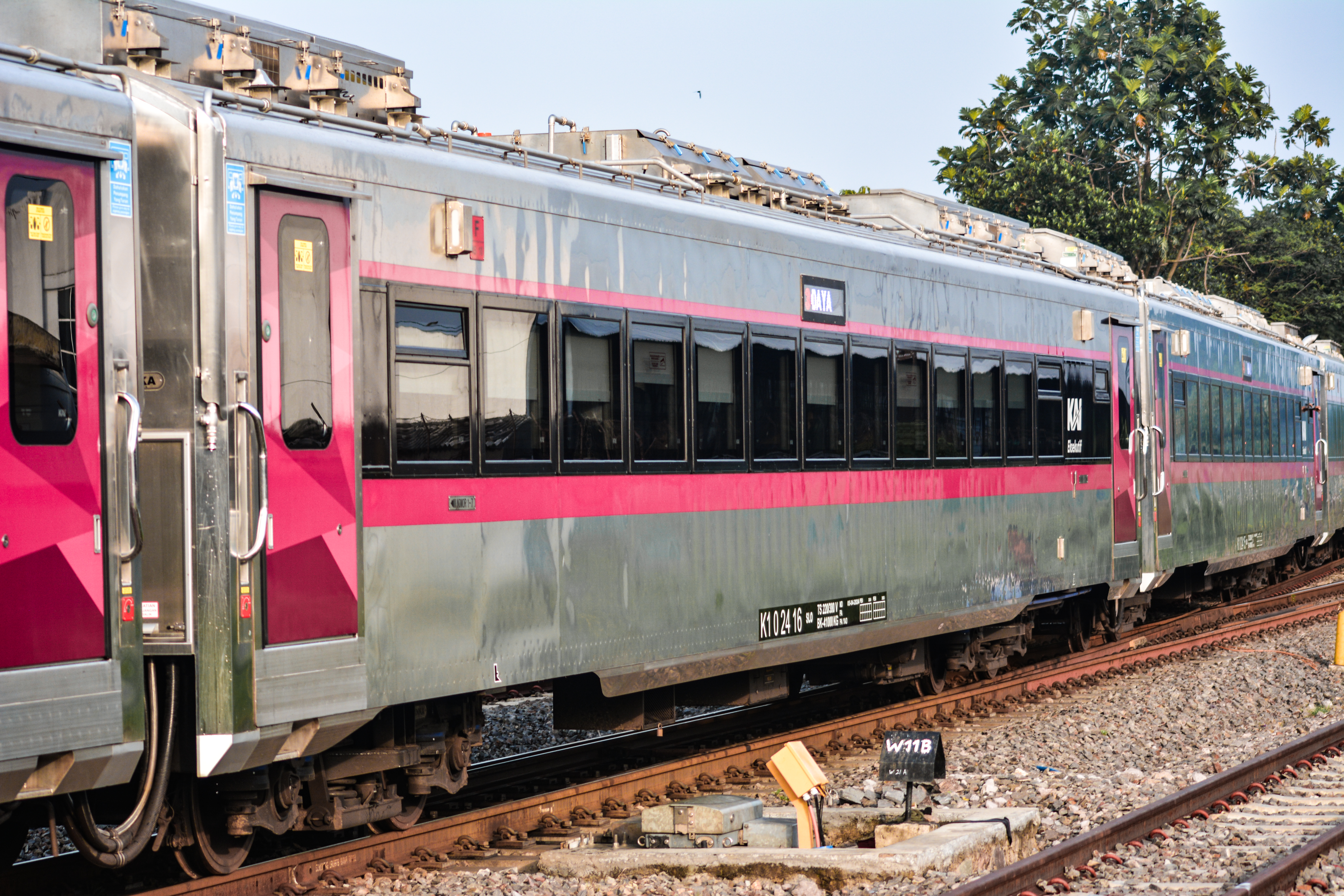
Executive New Generation Stainless Steel (Whoosh livery color) used by the Bangunkarta and Singasari train since 2026
