= Magetan railway station =

Railway station in Indonesia

Magetan Station Stasiun Magetan
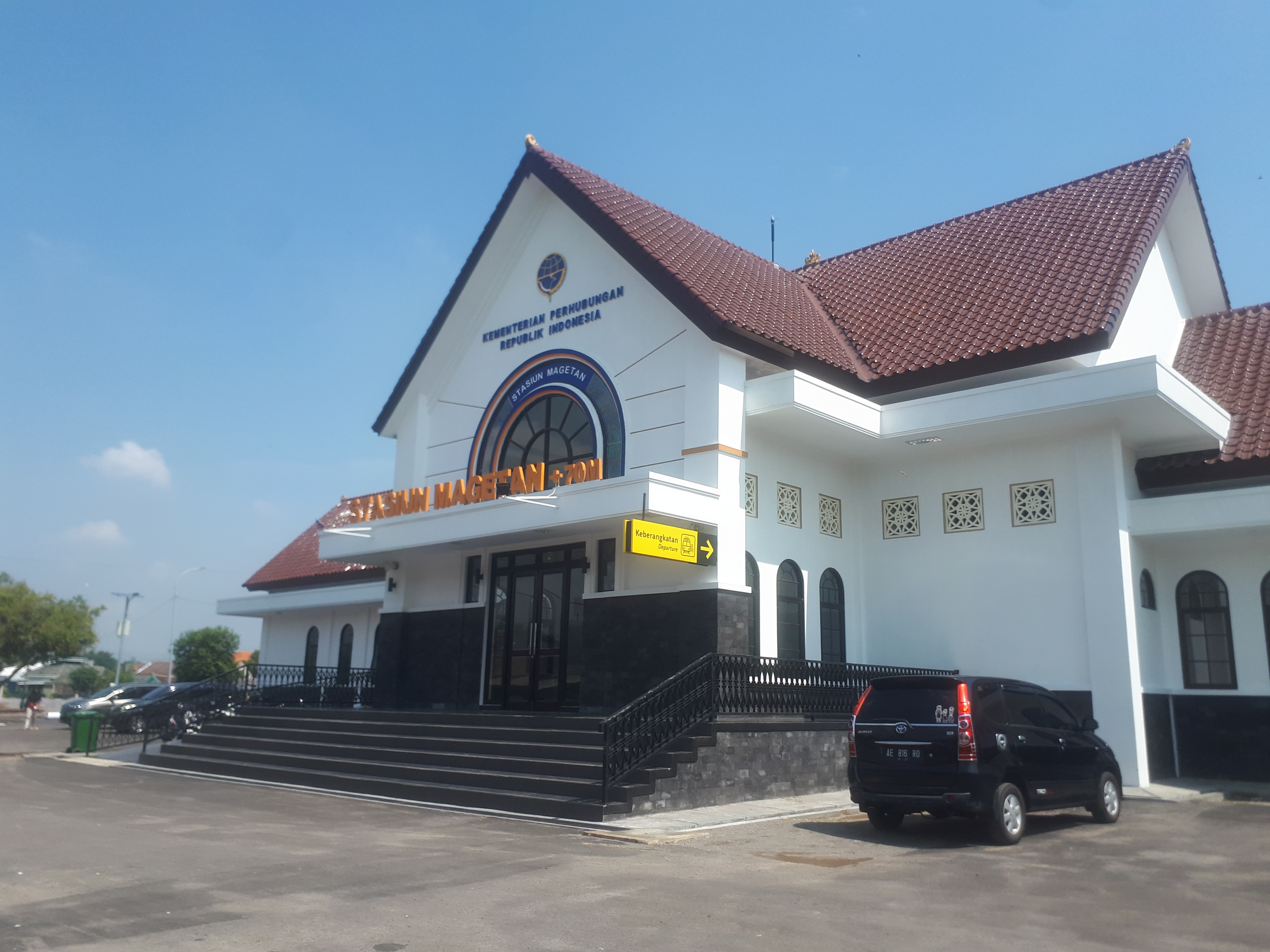
- Magetan railway station's new building, 2019

General information
- Location: Karangsono, Barat, Magetan Regency; East Java; Indonesia
- Coordinates: 7°33′44″S 111°27′3″E
- Elevation: +70 m (230 ft)
- System: Inter-city rail
- Operator: Kereta Api Indonesia
- Line: Solo Balapan–Kertosono
- Platforms: 1 side platform 2 island platforms
- Tracks: 4

Construction
- Structure type: Ground
- Parking: Available
- Accessible: Available

Other information
- Station code: MAG
- Classification: Third-class station

History
- Rebuilt: 16 October 2019
- Former names: Barat Station
Location
- Location within Java

Magetan Station (Indonesian: Stasiun Magetan, station code: MAG, formerly Barat Station (BAT)) is a third-class railway station in Karangsono, Barat, Magetan Regency, East Java, Indonesia, operated by Kereta Api Indonesia. This is the only railway station in Magetan Regency and located 20 km northeast from capital city of Magetan.

This station's new building is operated—which has four tracks (two main lines and two passing tracks)—since Babadan–Geneng double track segment activation on 16 October 2019. Moreover, this former railway station name, Barat, has been changed.

== Services ==
=== Passenger services ===
==== Mixed class ====
- Singasari, destination of Pasar Senen via Lempuyangan-Purwokerto and Blitar (executive-economy)
- Brantas, destination of Pasar Senen via Semarang Tawang and Blitar

==== Economy class ====
- Jayakarta, destination of Jakarta Kota and Surabaya Gubeng
- Matarmaja, destination of Pasar Senen via Semarang Tawang and Malang
- Kahuripan, destination of Kiaracondong and Blitar
- Sri Tanjung, destination of Lempuyangan and Ketapang

== Gallery ==
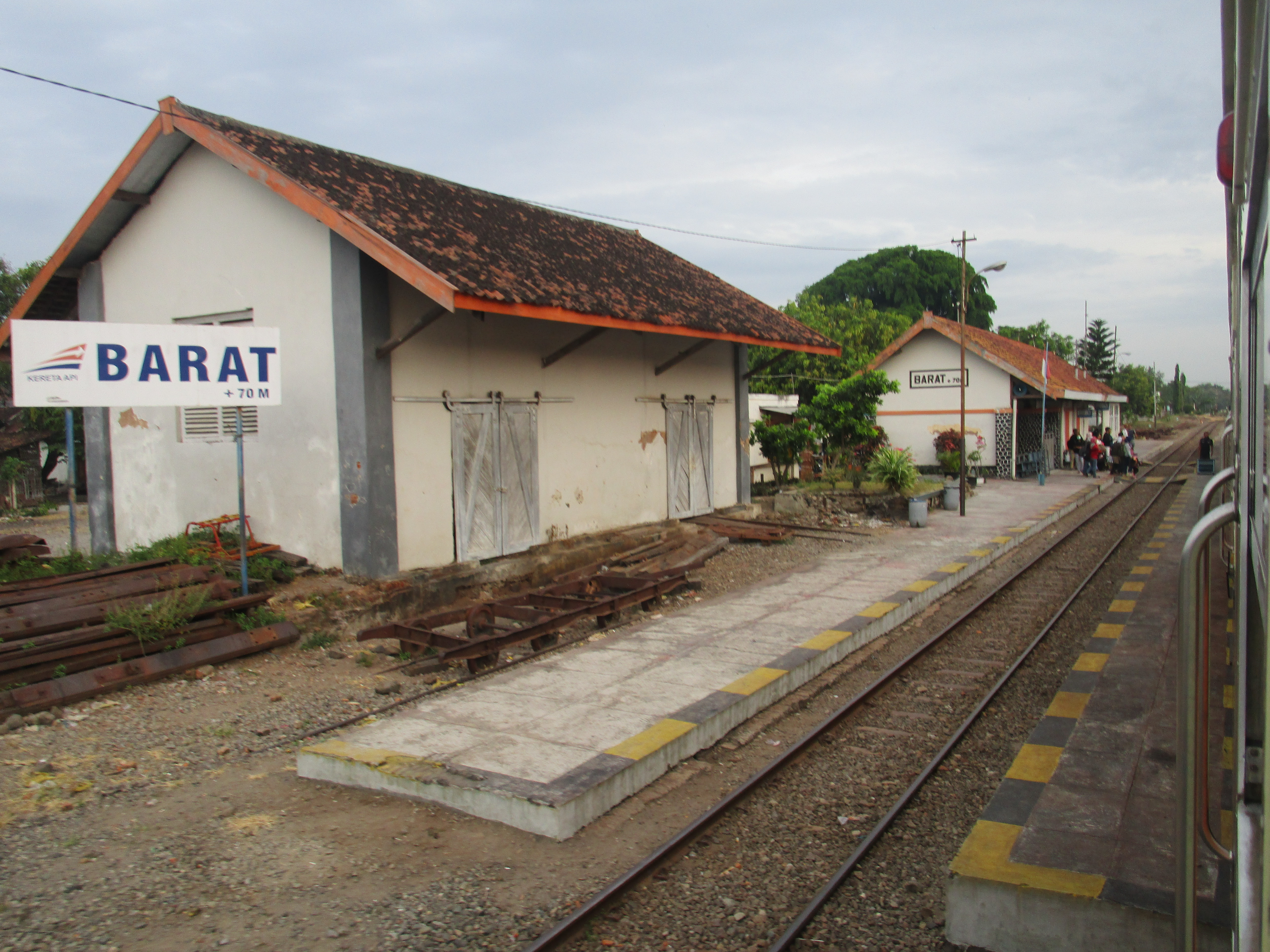
Magetan (Barat) railway station's old building has been demolished since the double track activation, 2015

Preceding station	Kereta Api Indonesia	Following station
Geneng towards Solo Balapan	Solo Balapan–Kertosono	Madiun towards Kertosono
