= Madiun Jaya =

Passenger train Jakarta - Madiun service in Indonesia

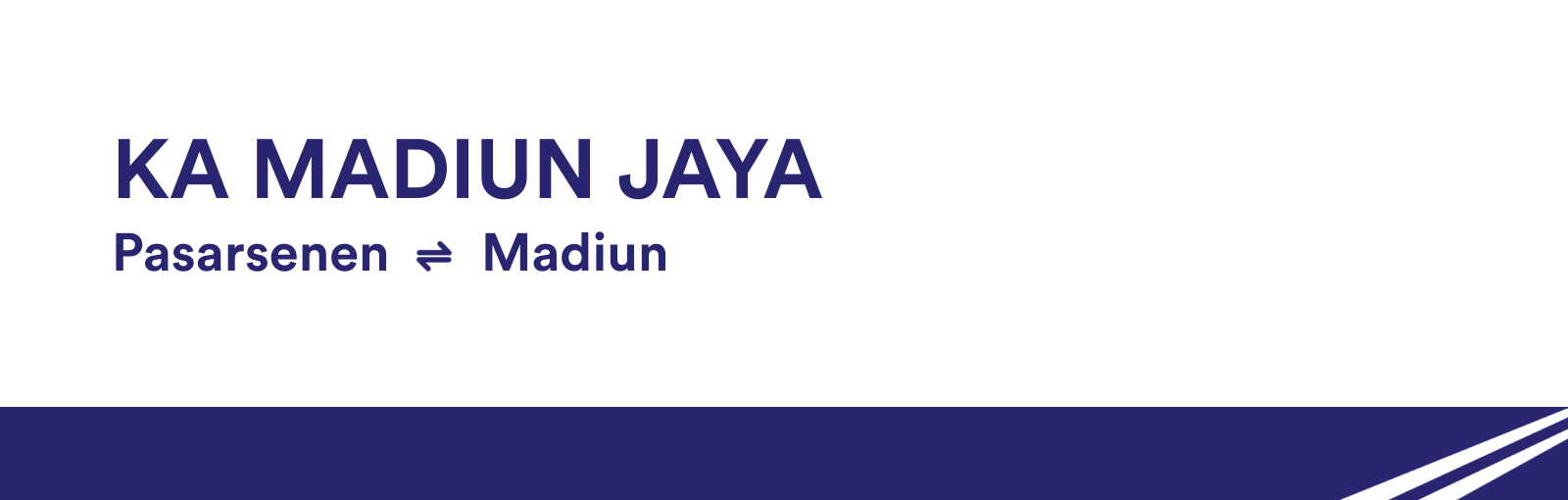

- Madiun Jaya train with white and blue locomotive livery pass through Lempuyangan Station.

Overview
- Service type: Inter-city rail
- Status: Operational
- Locale: Operational Area VII Madiun
- First service: 1 February 2025
- Current operator: Kereta Api Indonesia

Route
- Termini: Pasar Senen; Madiun
- Distance travelled: 667 kilometres (414 miles)
- Average journey time: 9 hours
- Service frequency: daily each way
- Train number: 143-144

On-board services
- Classes: premium economy and executive
- Seating arrangements: 50 seats arranged 2-2 (executive class); 80 seats arranged 2-2 (premium economy class)
- Catering facilities: On-board cafe and trolley service

Technical
- Rolling stock: CC203; CC201
- Track gauge: 1,067 mm
- Operating speed: 70–110 kilometres per hour (43–68 mph)
Route map

Madiun Jaya ia an passenger train with the premium economy and executive class that is operated by Kereta Api Indonesia which between Pasar Senen and Madiun via Purwokerto and Yogyakarta. The trip for time around 667 km (414 mi) in 9 hours.

== History ==
=== Introduction ===
Before operating as an intercity train with the Pasar Senen–Madiun service on 1 February 2025, the brand name Madiun Jaya was previously used for commuter and agglomeration train services, including the Madiun Jaya non-AC service operated by KAI. The Madiun Jaya non-AC train was inaugurated on 19 December 2009 by the then Minister of Transportation, Freddy Numberi, with the service Solo Balapan–Madiun–Kertosono. The non-AC Madiun Jaya operated using a fleet of second generation KRDI DMUs produced by INKA Limited. Due to low occupancy rates for the Madiun–Kertosono, the train route was then extended to Yogyakarta on 12 March 2010.

Since 20 June 2011, the Madiun Jaya brand has also been used for the Madiun Jaya Express AC commuter service on the Madiun–Yogyakarta. This service is operated using third generation KRDI. The train stops at stations along the Madiun–Yogyakarta service. The Madiun Jaya Express service was operated using second generation KRDI, which is usually used by the Arjuna Express, because the third generation KRDI often had problems. On 10 May 2016, the Madiun Jaya Express service was officially discontinued.

On 1 December 2019 following the enactment of new train travel chart 2019, The Madiun Jaya brand is again used by KAI for its mixed executive and business class facultative agglomeration train service, namely the Madiun Jaya train with the Madiun–Surabaya Pasarturi–Kandangan service. The Madiun Jaya train (Madiun–Kandangan) service was discontinued since the implementation of the enactment of new train travel chart 2023 on 1 June 2023.

=== Operational (2025-Present) ===
On 1 February 2025 following the enactment of new train travel chart 2025, the Madiun Jaya train was reflagged, this time as a long distance intercity train running from Pasar Senen to Madiun in 9 hours, making the fastest train between Jakarta and Madiun via Purwokerto and Yogyakarta.

At the start of operation, the Madiun Jaya rake consisted of one diesel locomotive, a generator car, six first generation stainless steel economy cars, one dining car and two light steel executive cars with wide glass characteristics. However, on 21 March 2025, the two executive class coaches were replaced with two 2025 retrofit executive coaches which were manufactured by Manggarai railway workshop. These two coaches are retrofits of executive coaches made in 2002 and 2009 by INKA Ltd, and use seats similar to the second generation stainless steel executive trains. The Madiun Jaya train is the first train to use these units.

According to the enactment of new train travel chart 2025, the Madiun Jaya train series is allocated by Jakarta Kota Train Depot and stops at Cipinang Train Depot. The economy class cars used by the Madiun Jaya train are former regular Kutojaya Utara train consists that have been discontinued since the implementation of enactment of new train travel chart 2025.

The Madiun Jaya train is one of the intercity passenger trains that has a terminus in Madiun from Pasar Senen in Jakarta, after previously there was the BIAS train service on the Adi Soemarmo Airport–Solo Balapan–Madiun route.

== Station ==
Here's route of the Madiun Jaya as the schedule is:

- Pasar Senen (Start/End)
- Jatinegara (only bound from Madiun)
- Bekasi
- Karawang
- Cirebon
- Purwokerto
- Kroya
- Kebumen
- Kutoarjo
- Yogyakarta
- Solo Balapan
- Sragen
- Walikukun
- Magetan
- Madiun (Start/End)

== See also ==
- Sawunggalih
