= Geneng railway station =

Railway station in Indonesia

Geneng Station Stasiun Geneng
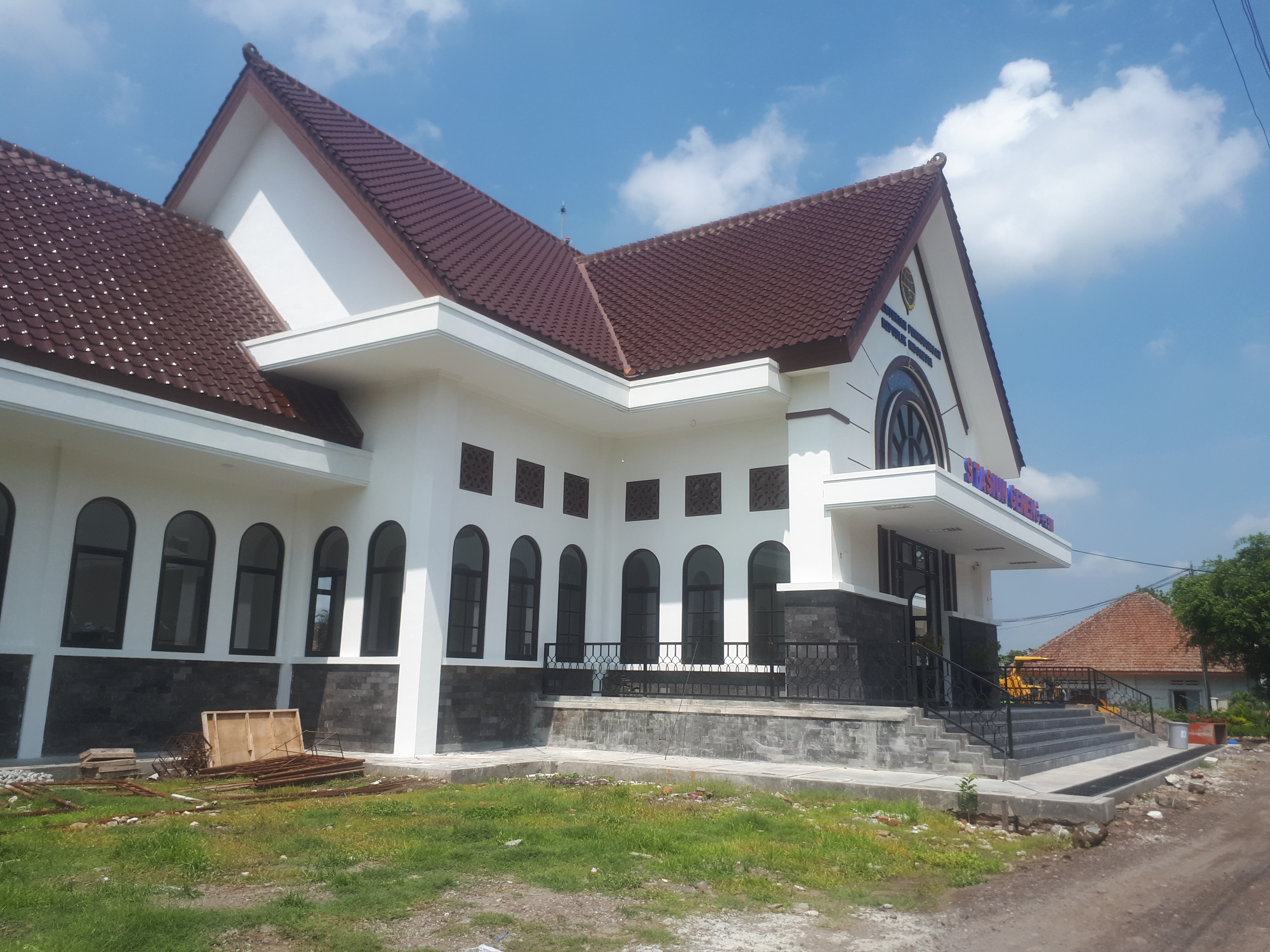
- The front view of Geneng railway station, 2019

General information
- Location: Tepas, Geneng; Ngawi; Indonesia
- Coordinates: 7°29′53″S 111°25′7″E
- Elevation: +53 m (174 ft)
- Operator: Kereta Api Indonesia
- Line: Solo Balapan–Kertosono
- Platforms: 1 side platform 2 island platforms
- Tracks: 4

Construction
- Structure type: Ground
- Accessible: Available

Other information
- Station code: GG
- Classification: Third-class station

History
- Rebuilt: 16 October 2019
Location
- Location within Java

Geneng Station (station code: GG) is a third-class railway station in Tepas, Geneng, Ngawi, Indonesia, operated by Kereta Api Indonesia, located 200 m southwest of Soedono Sugar Refinery Mill. This railway station is at the most southeastern railway station in Ngawi Regency. This station's new building is operated—which has four tracks (two main lines and two passing tracks)—since Babadan–Geneng double track segment activation on 16 October 2019 and Geneng–Kedungbanteng on 30 November 2019.

== Services ==
This railway station has no train services except for train overtaking.

== Gallery ==
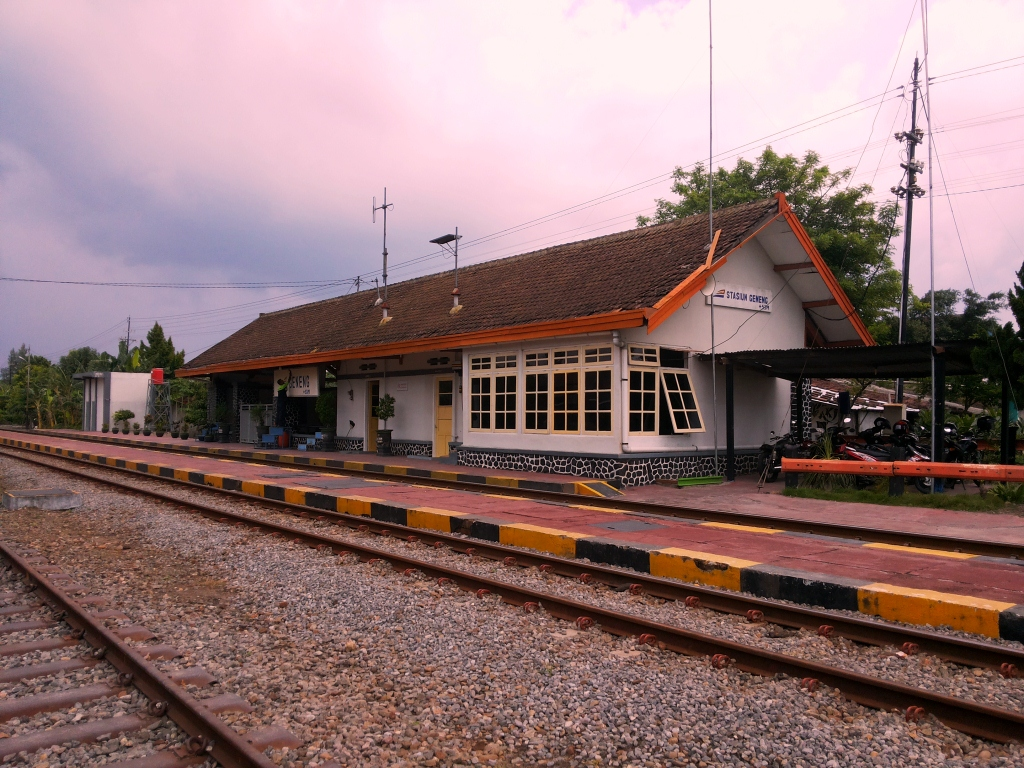
The Geneng railway station's old building has been demolished, 2014

Preceding station	Kereta Api Indonesia	Following station
Ngawi towards Solo Balapan	Solo Balapan–Kertosono	Magetan towards Kertosono
