= Benteng railway station =

Railway station in Indonesia

Benteng Station Stasiun Benteng
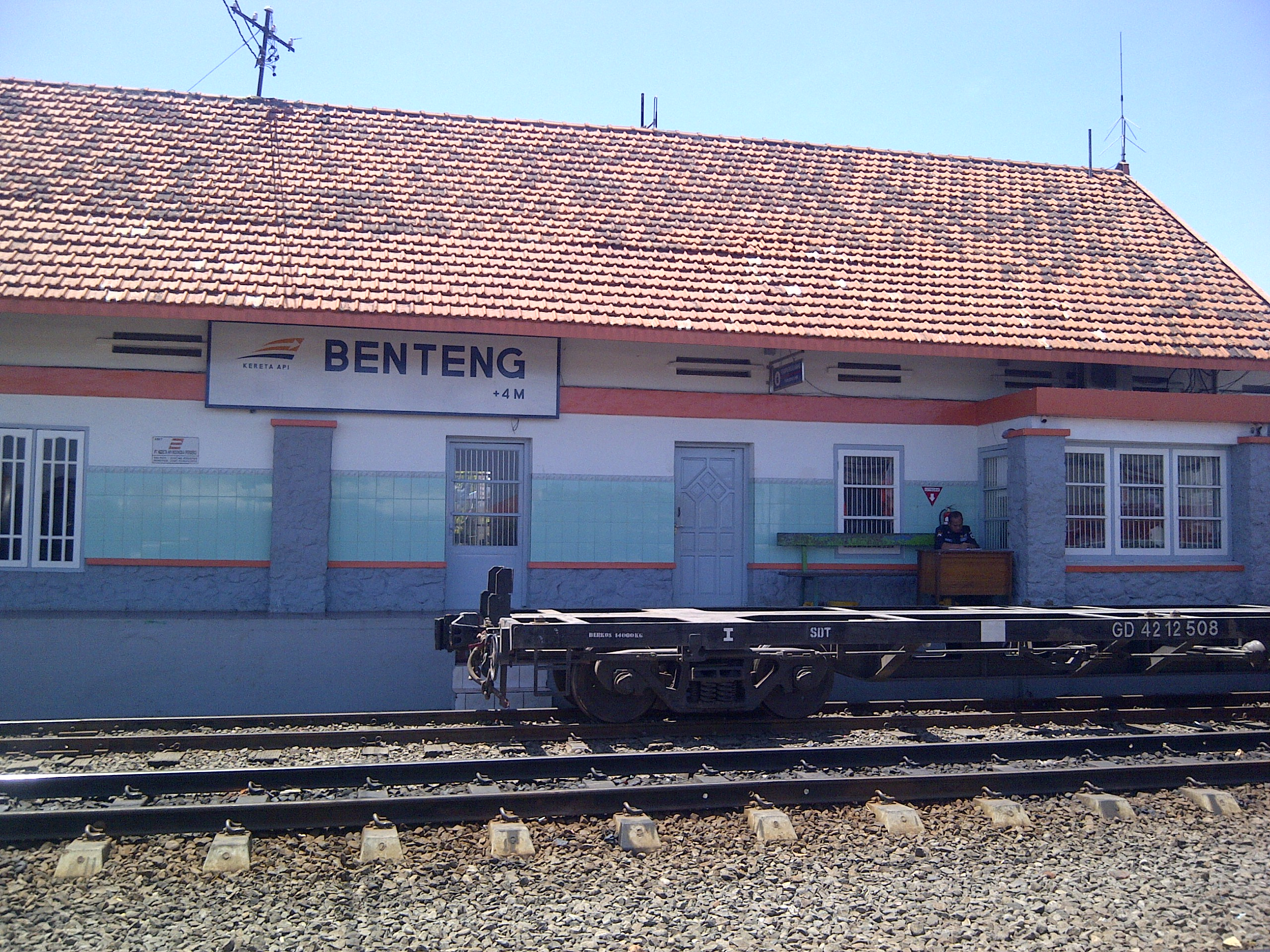
- Benteng Station

General information
- Location: Jl. Stasiun Benteng, Ujung, Semampir, Surabaya; East Java; Indonesia
- Coordinates: 7.22113°S 112.743856°E
- Elevation: +4 m (13 ft)
- Owner: Kereta Api Indonesia
- Operator: Kereta Api Indonesia
- Line: Surabaya railway
- Platforms: 1 side platform
- Tracks: 8

Construction
- Structure type: Ground
- Parking: Available

Other information
- Station code: BET
- Classification: Class I

History
- Opened: 1 January 1886
- Former names: Soerabaja Fort Prins Hendrik Station
Location
- Location within Surabaya

Benteng Station (BET) is a class I railway station located in Sawahpulo, Ujung, Semampir, Surabaya, included in the Operation Area VIII Surabaya at an altitude of +4 meters.

The station does not serve passenger transportation, but only functions as a storage area for boilers from the High Speed Diesel refueling station in the port area, as well as serving fuel shipments to Malang and Madiun.

The name "Benteng" began to be formally established in January 1950 based on the Buku Djarak untuk Djawa dan Madura.

== Services ==
The following is a list of train services at the Benteng Station.

=== Passenger services ===
There is no passenger services at this station.

=== Freight services ===
- Fuel oil, to Malang and Madiun

Preceding station	Kereta Api Indonesia	Following station
Sidotopo towards Surabaya Gubeng	Surabaya Railway; SGU–BET	Terminus
