= Madiun Regency =

Regency in East Java, Indonesia

Madiun Regency Kabupaten Madiun
- Regency

Other transcription(s)
  - Javanese: Madiyun (Gêdrig) مادييون (Pégon) ꦩꦢꦶꦪꦸꦤ꧀ (Hånåcåråkå)
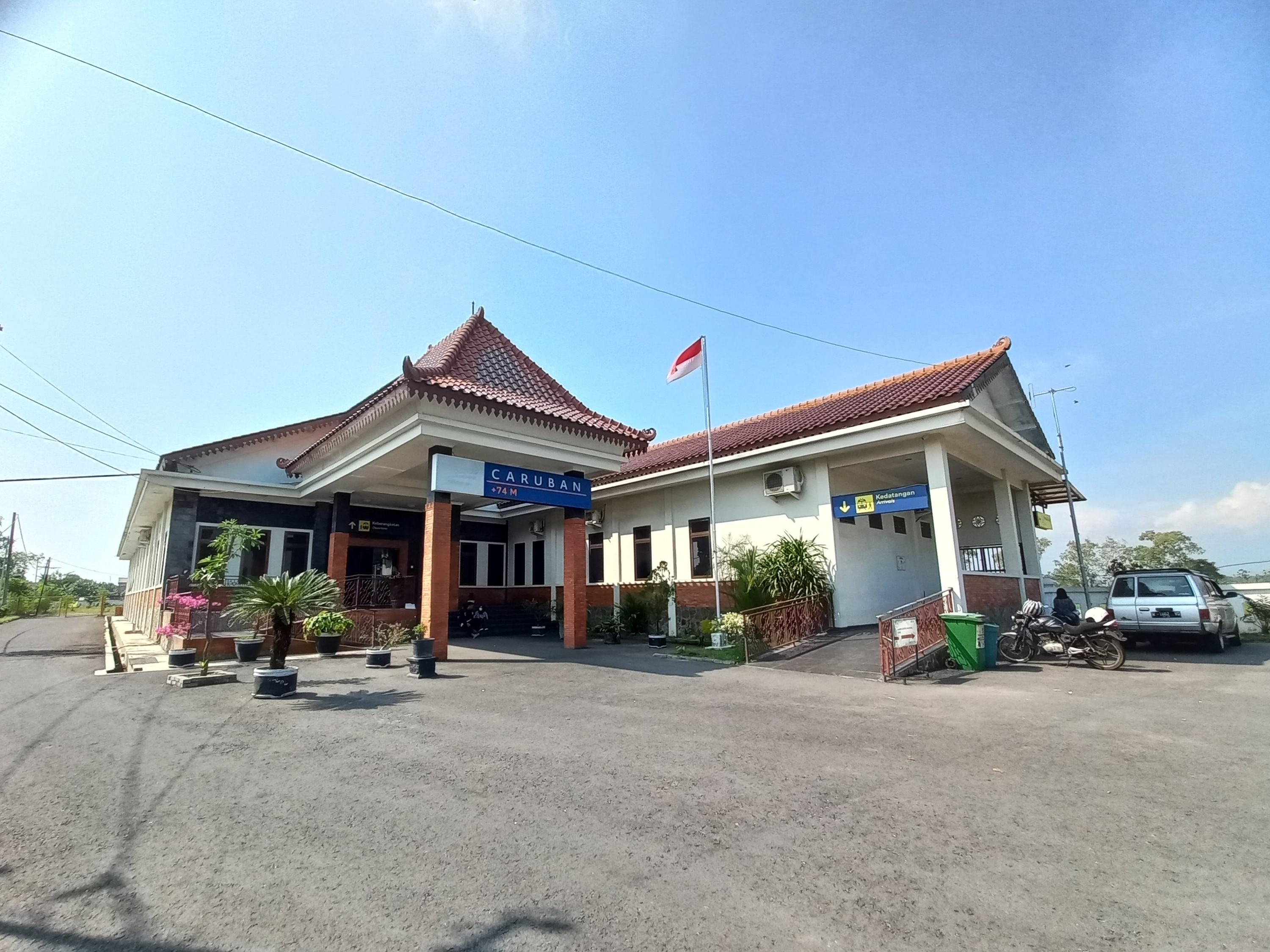
- Caruban Station

- Coat of arms

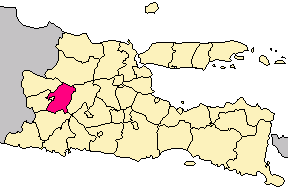
- Location within East Java

- Location in Java and Indonesia Madiun Regency (Indonesia)
- Coordinates: 7.6167°S 111.6500°E
- Country: Indonesia
- Province: East Java
- Capital: Caruban

Government
  - Regent: Hari Wuryanto
  - Vice Regent: Purnomo Hadi

Area
  - Total: 1,113.63 km^{2} (429.97 sq mi)

Population (mid 2025 estimate)
  - Total: 738,240
  - Density: 662.91/km^{2} (1,716.9/sq mi)
- Time zone: UTC+7 (IWST)
- Area code: (+62) 351
- Website: madiunkab.go.id

Madiun Regency (Indonesian: Kabupaten Madiun; Javanese: ꦩꦢꦶꦪꦸꦤ꧀) is a landlocked Regency in East Java province, Indonesia. It covers an area of 1,113.63 km^{2}, and had a population of 662,278 at the 2010 Census and 744,350 at the 2020 Census; the official estimate as at mid 2025 was 738,240 (comprising 365,331 males and 372,909 females). It is bordered by Bojonegoro Regency in the north, Nganjuk Regency in the east, Ponorogo Regency in the south, and Magetan Regency and Ngawi Regency in the west, while the independent city of Madiun (not included in the above figures) is an enclave within the regency.

Its capital was formerly the city of Madiun, but it was moved to Mejayan District by Government Regulation No.52 in 2010. However, Government Regulation No.3 of the Year 2019, as a revision of Government Regulation No. 52 of the year 2010, mentions that the capital of Madiun Regency is now called "Caruban", not Mejayan.

Most government buildings are located in areas that are part of the Caruban District. Other buildings will be moved gradually from the City of Madiun and the move began in 2011. In everyday conversation, Madiun Regency residents use the Javanese language with the dialect or dialects of Mataraman Madiun which is more inclined to accent Surakarta/Sala.

== Administrative districts ==
Madiun Regency consists of fifteen districts (kecamatan), tabulated below with their areas and population totals from the 2010 Census and the 2020 Census, together with the official estimates as at mid 2025. The table also includes the location of the district administrative centres, the number of administrative villages in each district (totaling 198 rural desa and eight urban kelurahan), and its postal codes.

| Kode Wilayah | Name of District (kecamatan) | Area in km^{2} | Pop'n Census 2010 | Pop'n Census 2020 | Pop'n Estimate mid 2025 | Admin centre | No. of villages | Post code |
|---|---|---|---|---|---|---|---|---|
| 35.19.01 | Kebonsari | 50.37 | 51,143 | 59,690 | 59,468 | Singgahan | 14 | 63173 |
| 35.19.02 | Dolopo | 39.01 | 51,524 | 60,729 | 59,887 | Dolopo | 12 ^{(a)} | 63174 |
| 35.19.03 | Geger | 51.60 | 57,415 | 66,081 | 65,242 | Purworejo | 19 | 63171 |
| 35.19.04 | Dagangan | 86.78 | 44,386 | 52,966 | 52,468 | Dagangan | 17 | 63172 |
| 35.19.05 | Kare | 124.13 | 29,492 | 33,448 | 34,212 | Kare | 8 | 63182 |
| 35.19.06 | Gemarang | 82.62 | 30,812 | 34,487 | 34,390 | Gemarang | 7 | 63156 |
| 35.19.07 | Wungu | 144.36 | 54,516 | 61,110 | 57,714 | Mojopurno | 14 ^{(b)} | 63181 |
| 35.19.08 | Madiun (district) | 90.12 | 36,786 | 39,542 | 38,453 | Nglames | 13 ^{(e)} | 63151 |
| 35.19.09 | Jiwan | 44.95 | 56,231 | 59,713 | 57,354 | Jiwan | 14 | 63161 |
| 35.19.10 | Balerejo | 188.96 | 40,942 | 44,115 | 44,351 | Jerukgulung | 18 | 63152 ^{(d)} |
| 35.19.11 | Mejayan (Caruban) | 54.01 | 41,811 | 46,208 | 47,662 | Bangunsari | 14 ^{(c)} | 63153 |
| 35.19.12 | Saradan | 37.56 | 62,049 | 70,630 | 71,045 | Sugiwaras | 15 | 63155 |
| 35.19.13 | Pilangkenceng | 34.76 | 50,112 | 54,363 | 54,954 | Kenongorejo | 18 | 63154 |
| 35.19.14 | Sawahan | 22.96 | 23,697 | 25,873 | 25,408 | Pincangrejo | 13 | 63162 |
| 35.19.15 | Wonoasri | 61.46 | 31,362 | 35,395 | 35,632 | Sidomulyo | 10 | 63157 |
| | Totals | 1,113.63 | 662,278 | 744,350 | 738,240 | Caruban | 206 | |

Note: (a) including 2 kelurahan (Bangunsari and Milir). (b) including 2 kelurahan (Munggut and Wungu).
(c) comprising 3 kelurahan (Bangunsari, Krajan and Pandean) and 11 desa.
(d) except for the village of Sidodadi, which has a postcode of 63112.
(e) including one kelurahan (Nglames).

== History ==
Madiun is an area pioneered by Ki Panembahan Ronggo Jumeno, also called Ki Ageng Ronggo. The origin of the word "Madiun" is medi (ghost) and ayun-ayun (swing), the point is that when Ronggo Jumeno does "Tripe Madiun land" many ghosts wander around. A second explanation for the name keris owned by Ronggo Jumeno, is named Kris Tundhung Medhiun. At first not named Madiun, but Wonoasri.

Since the beginning, Madiun has been a territory under the control of the Sultanate of Mataram. In the course of the history of Mataram, Madiun is very strategically located in the region since the middle of the border with the kingdom of Kadiri (Daha). Therefore, during the reign of many rebels Mataram kingdom built a power base in Madiun. As the emergence of figures Retno Dumilah.

Some relics of the Duchy of Madiun one of which can be seen in the Village Kuncen, where there is the tomb of Ki Ageng Panembahan Ronggo Jumeno, Patih Wonosari besides the graves of the Regent Madiun, Madiun's oldest mosque is Masjid Nur Hidayatullah, artifacts around the mosque, and spring (bathing place) sacred.

During the time of the Dutch East Indies, Madiun was a gemeente self-governing (autonomous) because the Dutch community working in various industrial estates did not want to be governed by the Regents (who were Javanese). As an autonomous city, Madiun was founded on 20 June 1918, the first led by Madiun resident assistant. New since 1927 headed by a mayor.

=== Madiun Affair ===
The Madiun Affair was a communist uprising in 1948 during the Indonesian National Revolution in the town of Madiun. Leftist parties led an uprising against the leaders of the newly declared Indonesian Republic, but it was quashed by Republican forces.

On 18 September 1948 an 'Indonesian Soviet Republic' was declared in Madiun, in the western part of East Java, by members of the Indonesian Communist Party (PKI) and the Indonesian Socialist Party (PSI). Judging the time as right for a proletarian uprising, they intended it to be a rallying center for revolt against "Sukarno-Hatta, the slaves of the Japanese and America". Madiun, however, was won back by Republican forces within a few weeks, and the insurgency leader, Musso, was killed. During the fighting, RM Suryo, the governor of East Java, as well as several police officers and religious leaders, were killed by the rebels.

The quashing of the rebellion ended a dangerous distraction for the Revolution, turning vague American sympathies based on anti-colonial sentiments into diplomatic support. Internationally, the Republic was now seen as being staunchly anti-communist and a potential ally in the brewing global Cold War between the American-led 'free world' and the Soviet-led bloc.

== Transport ==
=== Road ===
Madiun is on the main road to Yogyakarta and Jakarta.

=== Rail ===
Rail map showing Madiun. Click on the map to enlarge

The county is also crossed by railway lines across southern Java. Significant cities and districts are:

- Caruban
- Saradan
- Dolopo
- Dagangan
- Balerejo

== Topography ==
The northern part of Madiun is a hilly region, which is part of the Kendeng Mountains. The middle part is a plateau and undulating, being the southeast part of the Mount Wilis - Mount Liman mountain range.

== Agriculture and crafts ==
Prominent activities are:

- farming of rice, soybeans, and pulses
- plantations of cocoa, coffee, mango, durian, rambutan, and forest products
- processed products, such as teak wood crafts

Durian and cocoa are cultivated in Dagangan District and Kare District. There is a Coffee garden with large-scale cultivation in Kandangan, Kare District, which is of Dutch heritage.

== Visitor attractions ==
Liman is the highest mountain peak in the Mountains Wilis range, promising an extraordinary sensation of climbing. Much fauna and flora are found along the route as are statues of Pulosari, Kare District. Unfortunately, these pathways are rarely traveled by the climber, because the access is difficult. If the path Kare-Lake Ngebel District already had asphalting, it would rival the charm of other mountains in Java. The slopes have tremendous tourism potential. Attractions include:

- Slampir Waterfall
- Grantham Monument
- General Sudirman Monument
- Selorejo Waterfall
- Kandangan Coffee Plantation
- Grape Tour Wana
