= Singasari (train) =

Train service between Jakarta and Blitar via Purwokerto and Yogyakarta, Indonesia

Singasari train

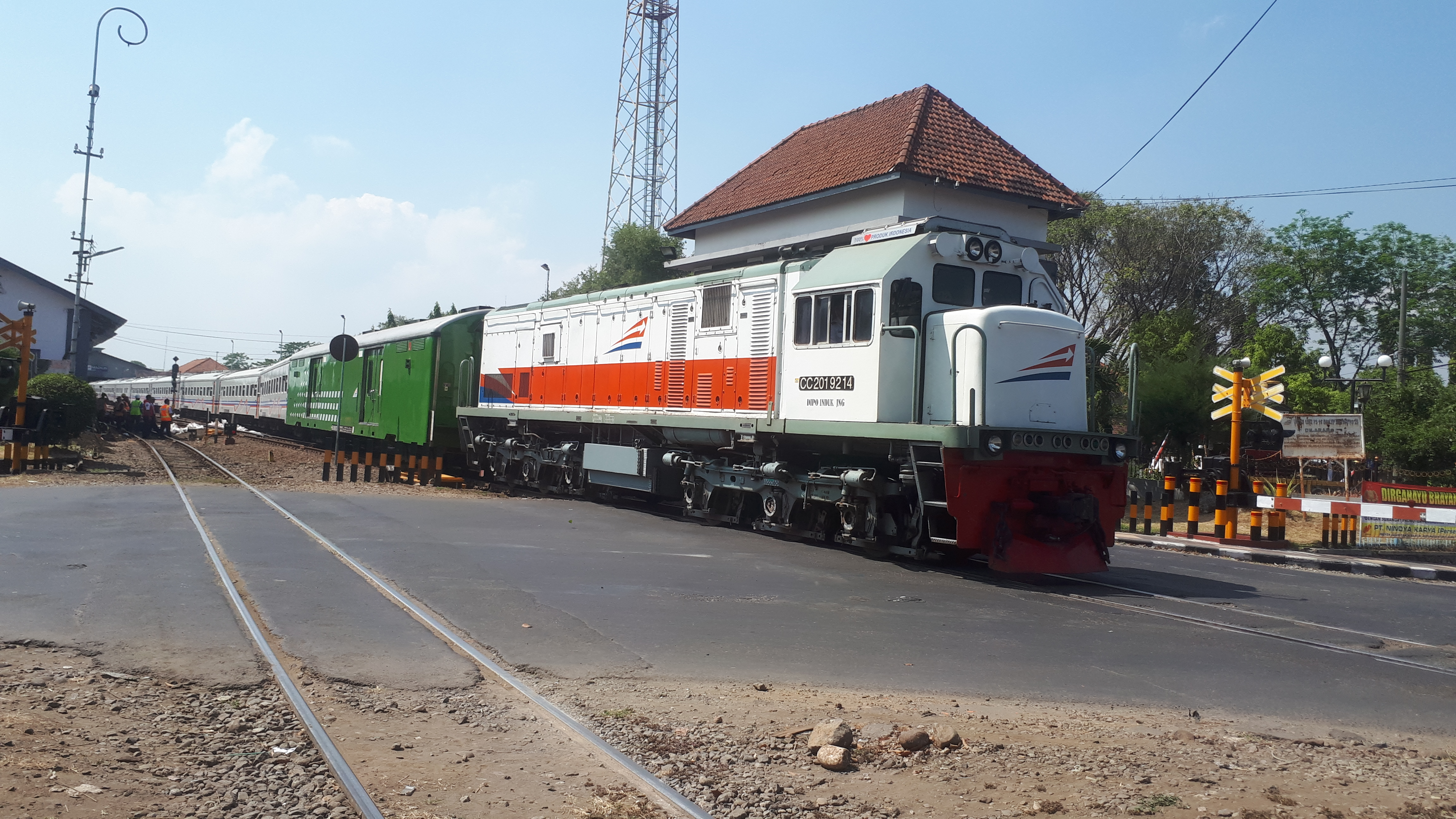
- Singasari train left from Madiun, 2019

Overview
- Service type: Inter-city rail
- Status: Operational
- Locale: Operational Area VII Madiun
- Predecessor: Krakatau train (2013–2017)
- First service: 17 July 2017
- Current operator: Kereta Api Indonesia

Route
- Termini: Pasar Senen; Blitar
- Distance travelled: 828 kilometres (514 miles)
- Average journey time: 13 hours 14 minutes
- Service frequency: daily each way
- Train number: 149-150

On-board services
- Classes: economy and executive
- Seating arrangements: 50 seats arangged 2-2 (executive class); 72 seats arranged 2-2 (economy class)
- Catering facilities: On-board cafe and trolley service

Technical
- Rolling stock: CC206; CC203; CC201
- Track gauge: 1,067 mm
- Operating speed: 81.5–100 kilometres per hour (50.6–62.1 mph)
Route map

Singasari train is a passenger train operated by Kereta Api Indonesia running between Pasar Senen and Blitar via Cirebon, Purwokerto, Yogyakarta or Lempuyangan, and Madiun. It offers executive and economy class seating. The route is approximately 880 km long with a travel time ranging from about 12 to 13 hours depending on the direction and timetable.

The service strengthens intercity connectivity in Java and contributes to regional mobility and economic activity. Between January and September 2025, it served 336,878 passengers, increasing from 326,560 passengers in the same period in 2024. The route links major urban centres, industrial zones, agricultural regions, and tourism destinations across the island.

== History ==
Before the introduction of Singasari, the Krakatau Express operated the Blitar–Merak route with a length of about 945 km, passing through multiple provinces across Java. The Krakatau Express served as the long-distance connection linking Blitar in East Java to Merak in Banten, making it one of the longest routes in the country.

On 19 August 2016, the Singosari Express operated on the Surabaya Gubeng-Malang using a spare set from the Mutiara Selatan series that was idle in Surabaya City. However, the Singosari Express ceased operations on 25 September 2016, ending after 36 days due to low demand. Its route was then continued by the Arjuno Express and the Jayabaya train on the Pasar Senen–Surabaya Pasar Turi–Malang service.

On 17 July 2017, the Krakatau Express service was discontinued and its route was shortened to the Blitar–Pasar Senen corridor. The service was relaunched under the new name Singasari train, marking the beginning of its current operation. The name derives from the Singasari Kingdom in East Java founded in 1222, as well as the Singosari sub-district in Malang Regency.

In 2019, additional executive-class coaches were added to support increasing passenger demand for long-distance comfort. Service development has included improvements in digital ticketing, station facilities, and operational efficiency to support sustainable mobility and economic activity along the corridor.

On 1 June 2023, following adjustments in the new train timetable, the Singasari train exchanged train sets with the Bangunkarta train due to the similarity in their configurations. This exchange was intended to shorten the train's rest time at Pasar Senen Station. In connection with changes to the Argo Merbabu set, which received a handover train set from Argo Sindoro/Argo Muria with the image executive class type, starting 19 July 2025 (H+2 after the anniversary) the Singasari train (along with the Bangunkarta train) used a handover train set from the 2016/2017 new image light steel series.

== Station ==
Singasari train serves major stations along the Pasar Senen–Blitar corridor via Purwokerto and Yogyakarta or Lempuyangan, including:

- Pasar Senen (start/end)
- Jatinegara (only bound from Blitar)
- Bekasi
- Cikarang (only bound to Blitar)
- Karawang
- Cikampek
- Haurgeulis
- Jatibarang
- Cirebon
- Bumiayu
- Purwokerto
- Kroya
- Gombong
- Kebumen
- Kutoarjo
- Wates
- Lempuyangan
- Klaten
- Purwosari
- Sragen
- Walikukun
- Ngawi
- Magetan
- Madiun
- Caruban
- Nganjuk
- Kertosono
- Kediri
- Tulungagung
- Ngunut
- Blitar (start/end)

== Incident ==
On 10 March 2025, the Singasari train hit a car in Dusun Genengan, Blitar Regency killing one driver.

== Gallery ==
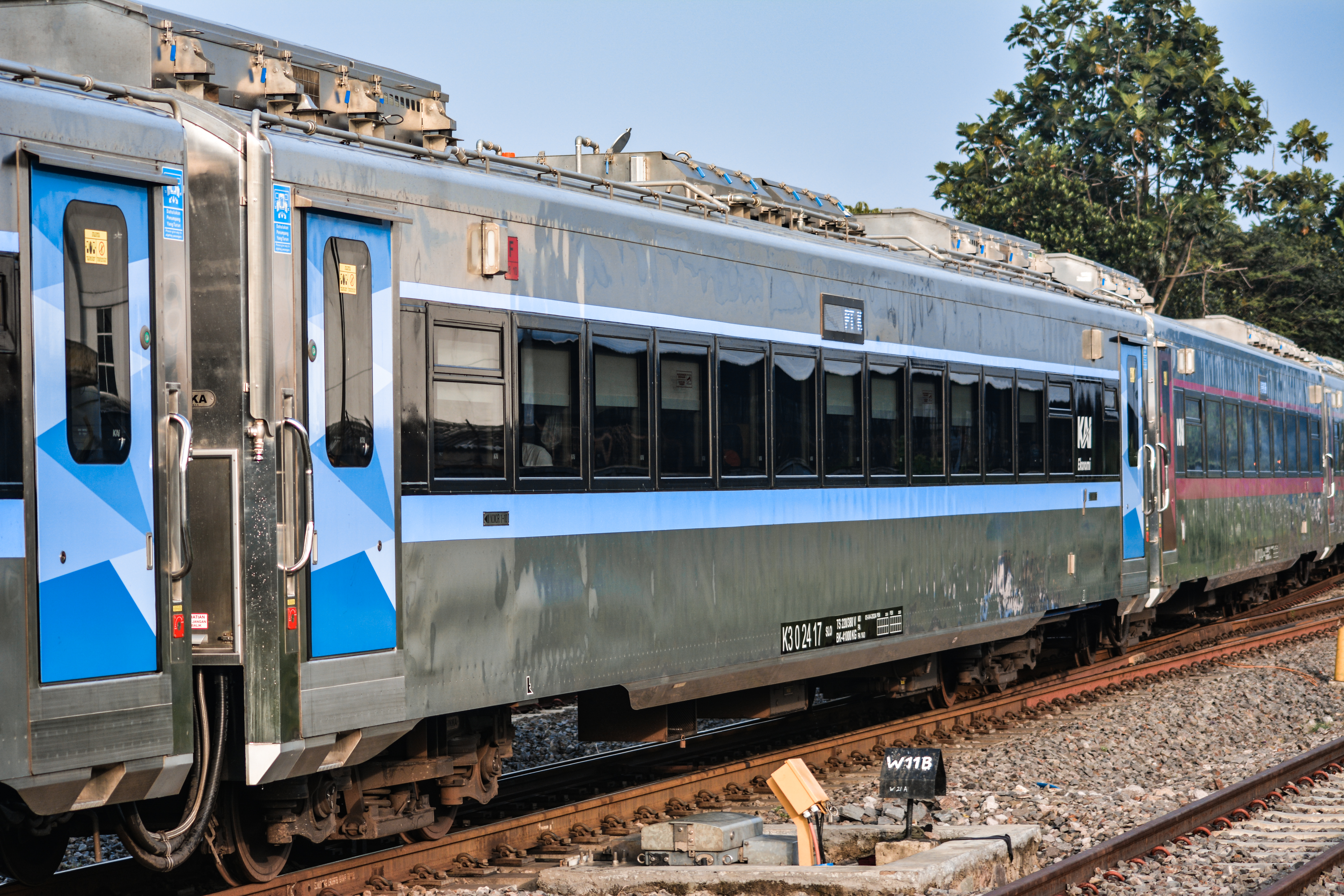
Economy New Generation Stainless Steel used by the Bangunkarta and Singasari train since April 2026

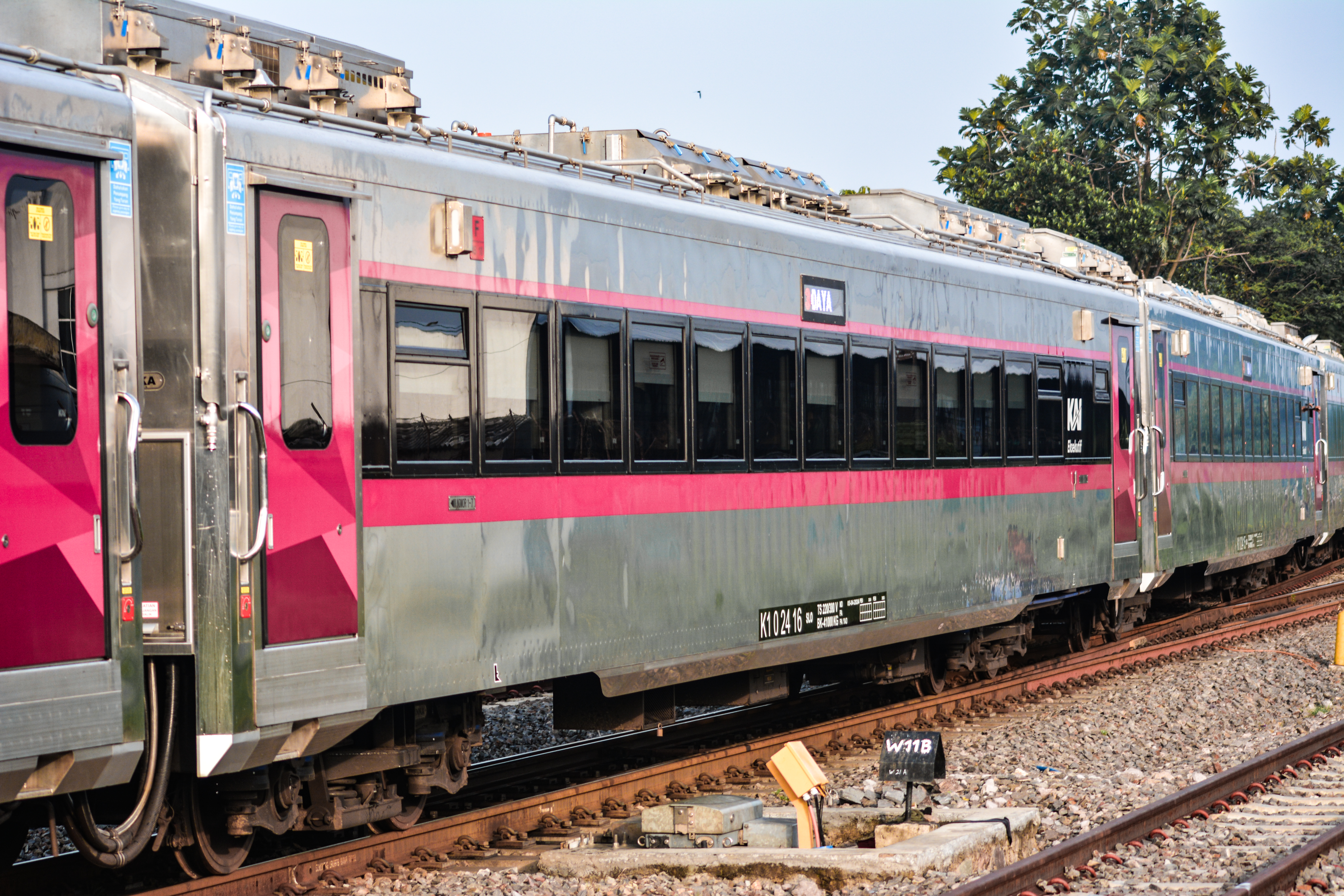
Executive New Generation Stainless Steel (Whoosh livery color) used by the Bangunkarta and Singasari train since April 2026
