= Nganjuk railway station =

Railway station in Indonesia

Nganjuk Station Stasiun Nganjuk
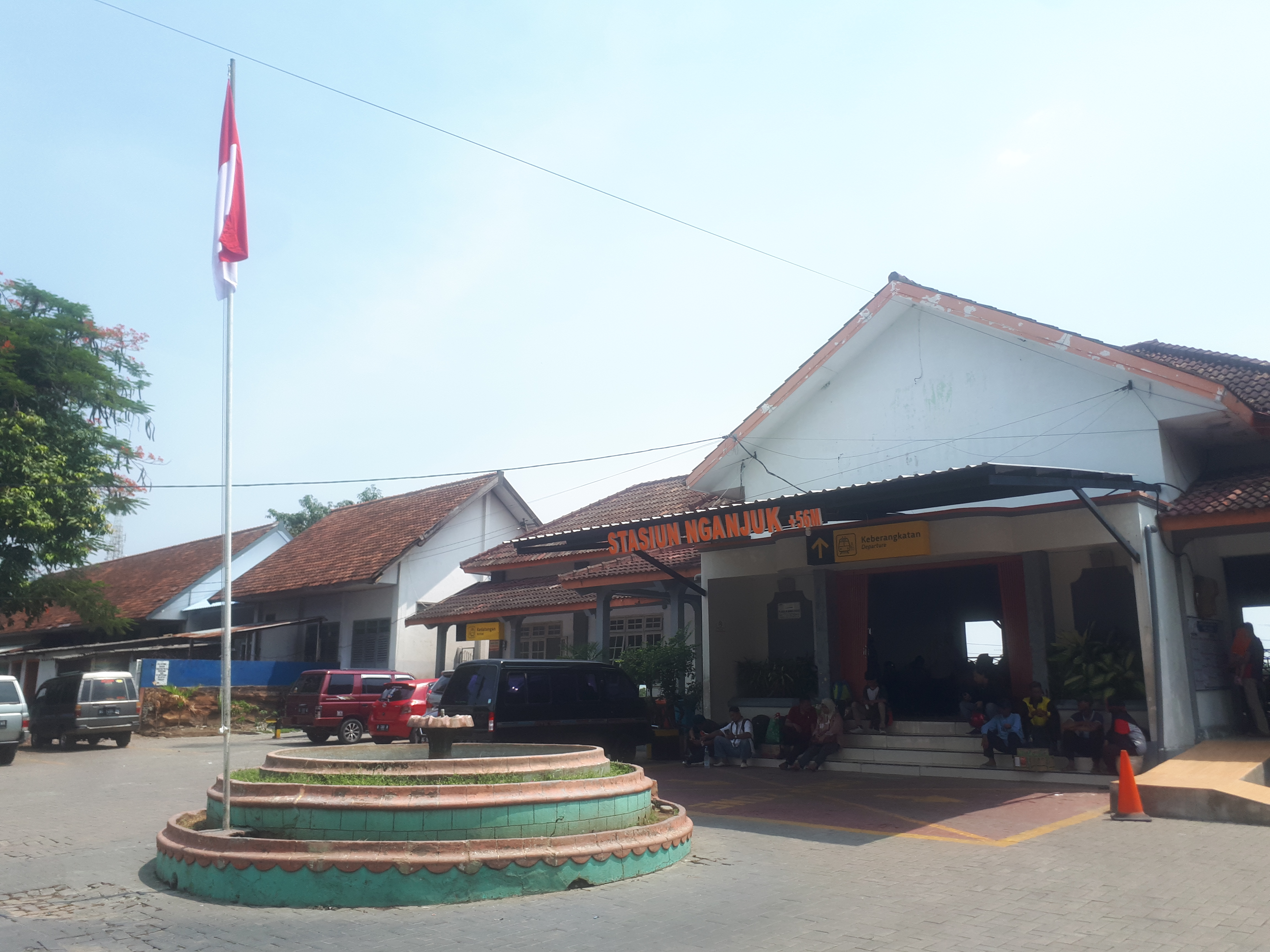
- The front view of Nganjuk railway station, 2019

General information
- Location: Panglima Sudirman Road; Mangundikaran, Nganjuk, Nganjuk; East Java; Indonesia
- Coordinates: 7°36′1″S 111°54′9″E
- Elevation: +56 m (184 ft)
- System: Inter-city rail station
- Operator: Kereta Api Indonesia
- Line: Solo Balapan–Kertosono
- Platforms: 1 side platform 2 island platforms
- Tracks: 4

Construction
- Structure type: Ground
- Parking: Available
- Accessible: Available

Other information
- Station code: NJ
- Classification: First-class station
Location
- Location within Java

Nganjuk Station (station code: NJ) is a first-class railway station in Mangundikaran, Nganjuk, Nganjuk Regency, East Java, Indonesia, operated by Kereta Api Indonesia. This railway station is located on Panglima Sudirman Road, at the city centre of Nganjuk. Although located in capital of Nganjuk, this railway station building is smaller than Kertosono railway station, the major station and terminus of Solo Balapan–Kertosono railway.

== Services ==
=== Passenger services ===
==== Executive class ====
- Bima & Argo Semeru, destination of Gambir via Yogyakarta and Surabaya Gubeng
- Gajayana, destination of Gambir via Yogyakarta and Malang
- Turangga, destination of Bandung and Surabaya Gubeng
- Brawijaya, destination of Gambir via Semarang Tawang and Malang

==== Mixed class ====
- Mutiara Selatan, destination of Bandung and Surabaya Gubeng (executive-economy)
- Malabar, destination of Bandung and Malang (executive-business-economy)
- Singasari, destination of Pasar Senen via Lempuyangan and Blitar (executive-economy)
- Brantas, destination of Pasar Senen via Semarang Tawang and Blitar
- Ranggajati, destination of Cirebon via Yogyakarta and Jember via Surabaya Gubeng
- Wijayakusuma, destination of Cilacap and Ketapang via Surabaya Gubeng
- Bangunkarta, destination of Pasar Senen via Lempuyangan and Jombang (executive-economy)
- Kertanegara, destination of Purwokerto and Malang (executive-economy)
- Malioboro Express, destination of Yogyakarta and Malang (executive-economy)
- Sancaka, destination of Yogyakarta and Surabaya Gubeng
- Logawa, destination of Purwokerto and Jember (business-economy)

==== Economy class ====
- Majapahit, destination of Pasar Senen via Semarang Tawang and Malang
- Jayakarta, destination of Pasar Senen via Lempuyangan and Surabaya Gubeng
- Matarmaja, destination of Pasar Senen via Semarang Tawang and Malang
- Kahuripan, destination of Kiaracondong and Blitar
- Pasundan, destination of Kiaracondong and Surabaya Gubeng
- Sri Tanjung, destination of Lempuyangan and Ketapang via Surabaya Kota

=== Freight services ===
- Over-night service, destination of Surabaya Kota and destination of:
  - Bandung via Yogyakarta-Kroya-Tasikmalaya
  - Jakarta Gudang via Lempuyangan-Purwokerto-Cirebon Prujakan

Preceding station	Kereta Api Indonesia	Following station
Bagor towards Solo Balapan	Solo Balapan–Kertosono	Sukomoro towards Kertosono
