= List of named passenger trains of Indonesia =

This article contains lists of named passenger trains in Indonesia, which are operational on Java and Sumatra by the national railway company, PT Kereta Api Indonesia (Indonesian Railways Company).

== Executive class ==
As of 2021, all executive class trains service have been standardized, but trains which previously had the title "Argo" retained the title, although they have no differences from other executive class trains.

=== Argo subclass ===
All Argo class trains are named after mountains in Indonesia, with the exception of Argo Dwipangga, Anggrek and the Bima. As of February 2025, some Executive Fauna subclass were upclassed to the Executive Argo class.

Train number	Name of train	Depot	Carriages set	Route
1–4	Anggrek	Surabaya Pasar Turi (SBI)	Locomotive, 9 executive class (K1) carriages, 1 Luxury sleeper carriages (Compartment), 1 dining carriage, 1 electric generator carriage.	Gambir (GMR) – Surabaya Pasar Turi (SBI)
5–6	Argo Semeru	Sidotopo (SDT)	Locomotive, 8 executive class (K1) carriages, 1 dining carriage, 1 electric generator carriage.	Gambir (GMR) – Surabaya Gubeng (SGU) via Yogyakarta
7–8	Bima	Sidotopo (SDT)	Locomotive, 8 executive class (K1) carriages, 1 dining carriage, 1 electric generator carriage.	Gambir (GMR) – Surabaya Gubeng (SGU) via Yogyakarta
9-10	Argo Wilis	Bandung (BD)	Locomotive, 8 executive class (K1) carriages, 1 Executive panoramic observation carriage, 1 dining carriage, 1 electric generator carriage.	Bandung (BD) – Surabaya Gubeng (SGU)
11-12	Turangga	Bandung (BD)	Locomotive, 8 executive class (K1) carriages, 1 Executive panoramic observation carriage, 1 dining carriage, 1 electric generator carriage.	Bandung (BD) – Surabaya Gubeng (SGU)
13-14	Argo Lawu	Solo Balapan (SLO)	Locomotive, 9 executive class (K1) Carriages, 1 luxury sleeper carriages, 1 dining carriage, 1 electric generator carriage.	Gambir (GMR) – Solo Balapan (SLO) via Purwokerto
15-16	Argo Dwipangga	Solo Balapan (SLO)	Locomotive, 9 executive class (K1) Carriages, 1 luxury sleeper carriages, 1 dining carriage, 1 electric generator carriage.	Gambir (GMR) – Solo Balapan (SLO) via Purwokerto
17-19	Argo Sindoro	Semarang Poncol (SMC)	Locomotive, 9 Executive class (K1) carriages, 1 dining carriage, 1 electric generator carriage.	Gambir (GMR) – Semarang Tawang (SMT)
20-22	Argo Muria	Semarang Poncol (SMC)	Locomotive, 9 Executive class (K1) Carriages, 1 dining carriage, 1 electric generator carriage.	Gambir (GMR) – Semarang Tawang (SMT)
23-28	Argo Merbabu	Semarang Poncol (SMC)	Locomotive, 9 executive class (K1) carriages, 1 compartment suites carriages, 1 dining carriage, 1 electric generator carriage.	Gambir (GMR) – Semarang Tawang (SMT)
29F-30F	Argo Anjasmoro	Semarang Poncol (SMC)	Locomotive, 8 executive class (K1) carriages, 1 dining carriage, 1 electric generator carriage.	Gambir (GMR) – Semarang Tawang (SMT)

=== Fauna subclass ===
Train Number	Train name	Name meaning	Operator	Train endpoints	Operated
31-34	Pandalungan	taken from the Madurese sub tribe, namely "Pendalungan" who controls the city of Horseshoe (Jember Regency)	PT. Kereta Api Indonesia (persero) Operation Area 1 Jakarta	Jakarta Gambir (GMR)–Surabaya Pasarturi (SBI)–Jember (JR)	2023–
35-36	Gajayana	refers to King of Kanjuruhan Kingdom	PT. Kereta Api Indonesia (persero) Operation Area 8 Surabaya	Malang (ML)–Madiun (MN)–Yogyakarta (YK)–Purwokerto (PWT)–Jakarta Gambir (GMR)	1999–
37-38	Brawijaya	refers to King of Majaphit Kingdom's Title	PT. Kereta Api Indonesia (persero) Operation Area 8 Surabaya	Malang (ML)–Madiun (MN)–Semarang Tawang (SMT)–Jakarta Gambir (GMR)	2021–
39-42	Sembrani	refers to the winged horse in Java Mythology	PT. Kereta Api Indonesia (persero) Operation Area 8 Surabaya	Jakarta Gambir (GMR)–Semarang Tawang (SMT)–Surabaya Pasar Turi (SBI)	1995–
43-48	Taksaka	Taksaka is the name of a great serpent / dragon in a kind hearted and gracious Mahabharata story.	PT. Kereta Api Indonesia (persero) Operation Area 6 Yogyakarta	Yogyakarta (YK)–Purwokerto (PWT)–Jakarta Gambir (GMR)	1999–
49-60F (49, 52, 54 and 55 were the only regular schedule for this Train)	Purwojaya	refers to Purwokerto, Jakarta Raya	PT. Kereta Api Indonesia (persero) Operation Area 5 Purwokerto	Cilacap (CP)–Purwokerto (PWT)–Jakarta Gambir (GMR)	1995-
61-64	Manahan	taken from the name of the stadium in Surakarta, namely Manahan Stadium	PT. Kereta Api Indonesia (persero) Operation Area 6 Yogyakarta And Operation Area 1 Jakarta	Jakarta Gambir (GMR)–Purwokerto (PWT)–Solo Balapan (SLO)	2015–2023 initial launch of the names Argo Lawu and Argo Dwipangga Fakultatif; 2023–
132-133, 138–140, 141F-142F	Parahyangan	Named after Parahyangan or Priangan, a mountainous region in West Java.	PT. Kereta Api Indonesia (persero) Operation Area 1 Bandung	Bandung(BD)–Jakarta Gambir (GMR)	2025- (Originally already launched since 1971, but were merged with Argo Gede to Form Argo Parahyangan as of 2010.)

== Mixed class ==
=== Executive, business and economy mixed class ===
Since 1 June 2023, this type of train has been abolished by KAI Limited.

=== Executive and business class ===
Train number	Train name	Operator	Train endpoints	Operated
S3–S4	Sindang Marga	PT. Kereta Api Indonesia (persero) Regional Division III Palembang	Kertapati (KPT)–Lubuk Linggau (LLG)	1986–
U51–U58	Sribilah	PT. Kereta Api Indonesia (persero) Regional Division I Sumatera Utara and Aceh	Medan (MDN)–Rantau Prapat (RAP)	1978–

=== Executive and Premium Economy class ===
Train number	Train name	Operator	Train endpoints	Operated
67-70	Malabar	PT. Kereta Api Indonesia (persero) Operation Area 8 Surabaya	Bandung (BD)–Yogyakarta (YK)–Madiun (MN)–Malang (ML)	2010–
71-72	Mutiara Selatan	PT. Kereta Api Indonesia (persero) Operation Area 8 Surabaya	Bandung (BD)–Yogyakarta (YK)–Madiun (MN)–Surabaya Gubeng (SGU)	1972–
81-86 (regular) 87F-88F (Facultative)	Sancaka	PT. Kereta Api Indonesia (persero) Operation Area 8 Surabaya and PT. Kereta Api Indonesia (persero) Operation Area 6 Yogyakarta	Yogyakarta (YK)–Madiun (MN)–Surabaya Gubeng (SGU)	1997–
95-102	Harina	PT. Kereta Api Indonesia (persero) Operation Area 2 Bandung	Bandung (BD)–Semarang Tawang (SMT)–Surabaya Pasar Turi (SBI)	2003–
105–106	Gajah Wong	PT. Kereta Api Indonesia (persero) Operation Area 6 Yogyakarta	Yogyakarta Lempuyangan (LPN)–Purwokerto (PWT)–Jakarta Pasar Senen (PSE)	2011–
107-110	Fajar/Senja Utama Yogya	PT. Kereta Api Indonesia (persero) Operation Area 6 Yogyakarta	Yogyakarta (YK)–Purwokerto (PWT)–Cirebon (CN)–Jakarta Pasar Senen (PSE)	1986–
111-116	Sawunggalih	PT. Kereta Api Indonesia (persero) Operation Area 5 Purwokerto	Jakarta Pasar Senen(PSE)–Purwokerto (PWT)–Kutoarjo (KTA)	1977–
117-120	Gunungjati	PT. Kereta Api Indonesia (persero) Operation Area 7 Madiun	Jakarta Gambir (GMR)–Cirebon (CN)–Semarang Tawang (SMT)	1986–
121-124	Cakrabuana	PT. Kereta Api Indonesia (persero) Operation Area 7 Madiun	Jakarta Gambir (GMR)–Cirebon (CN)–Purwokerto (PWT)	1986–
127-128	Pangandaran	PT. Kereta Api Indonesia (persero) Operation Area 1 Jakarta	Banjar (BJR)–Bandung (BD)–Jakarta Gambir (GMR)	2019–
129-130	Papandayan	PT. Kereta Api Indonesia (persero) Operation Area 1 Jakarta	Banjar (BJR)–Bandung (BD)–Jakarta Gambir (GMR)	2019–
131,134-137	Parahyangan	PT. Kereta Api Indonesia (persero) Operation Area 2 Bandung	Bandung (BD)–Jakarta Gambir (GMR)	2025-
143-144	Madiun Jaya	PT. Kereta Api Indonesia (persero) Operation Area 7 Madiun	Madiun (MN)–Yogyakarta (YK)–Cirebon (CN)–Jakarta Pasar Senen (PSE)	2025–
149-150	Singasari	PT. Kereta Api Indonesia (persero) Operation Area 7 Madiun	Jakarta Pasar Senen (PSE) –Purwokerto (PWT)–Yogyakarta Lempuyangan (LPN)–Madiun (MN)–Blitar (BL)	2017–
157-160	Wijayakusuma	PT. Kereta Api Indonesia (persero) Operation Area 5 Purwokerto	Cilacap (CP)–Yogyakarta (YK)–Surabaya Gubeng (SGU)–Jember (JR)	2017–
161-162	Bangunkarta	PT. Kereta Api Indonesia (persero) Operation Area 1 Jakarta	Jombang (JG)–Madiun (MN)–Semarang Tawang (SMT)–Jakarta Pasar Senen (PSE)	2001–
169–170	Kertanegara	PT. Kereta Api Indonesia (persero) Operation Area 8 Surabaya	Purwokerto (PWT)–Yogyakarta (YK)–Madiun (MN)–Malang (ML)	2021–
171-172	Malioboro Express	PT. Kereta Api Indonesia (persero) Operation Area 6 Yogyakarta	Yogyakarta (YK) - Madiun (MN) - Malang (ML)	2012-
7043-7046	Sangkuriang	PT. Kereta Api Indonesia (persero) Operation Area 9 Jember	Bandung (BD) - Surabaya Gubeng (SGU) - Ketapang (KTG)	2026-

=== Executive and economy plus/economy class ===
Train Number	Train name	Operator	Train endpoints	Operated
73-74	Fajar and Senja Utama Solo	PT. Kereta Api Indonesia (persero) Operation Area 6 Yogyakarta	Solo Balapan (SLO)–Yogyakarta (YK)–Purwokerto (PWT)–Cirebon (CN)–Jakarta Pasar Senen (PSE)	1978–
75-76	Mataram	PT. Kereta Api Indonesia (persero) Operation Area 6 Yogyakarta	Solo Balapan (SLO)–Yogyakarta (YK)–Purwokerto (PWT)–Cirebon (CN)–Jakarta Pasar Senen (PSE)	2017–
77-80	Lodaya	PT. Kereta Api Indonesia (persero) Operation Area 6 Yogyakarta	Bandung (BD)–Yogyakarta (YK)–Solo Balapan (SLO)	1992–
89-90	Gaya Baru Malam Selatan	PT. Kereta Api Indonesia (persero) Operation Area 8 Surabaya	Jakarta Pasar Senen (PSE) –Purwokerto (PWT)–Yogyakarta Lempuyangan (LPN)–Madiun (MN)–Surabaya Gubeng (SGU)	1975–
91-94	Jayabaya	PT. Kereta Api Indonesia (persero) Operation Area 1 Jakarta	Jakarta Pasar Senen (PSE)–Semarang Poncol (SMC)–Surabaya Pasar Turi (SBI)–Surabaya Gubeng (SGU)–Malang (ML)	2014–
103-104	Bogowonto	PT. Kereta Api Indonesia (persero) Operation Area 6 Yogyakarta	Yogyakarta Lempuyangan (LPN)–Purwokerto (PWT)–Jakarta Pasar Senen (PSE)	2010–
125F-126F	Cheribon	PT. Kereta Api Indonesia (persero) Operation Area 6 Yogyakarta	Yogyakarta Lempuyangan (LPN)–Purwokerto (PWT)–Jakarta Pasar Senen (PSE)	2010–
145-148	Blambangan Express	PT. Kereta Api Indonesia (persero) Operation Area 9 Jember	Semarang Tawang (SMT)–Surabaya Pasar Turi (SBI)–Jember (JR)–Banyuwangi Ketapang (KTG)	2022–
151-152	Brantas	PT. Kereta Api Indonesia (persero) Operation Area 7 Madiun	Blitar (BL)–Madiun (MN)–Semarang Tawang (SMT)–Jakarta Pasar Senen (PSE)	1998–
153-156	Ranggajati	PT. Kereta Api Indonesia (persero) Operation Area 3 Cirebon	Cirebon (CN)–Purwokerto (PWT)–Yogyakarta (YK)–Madiun (MN)–Surabaya Gubeng (SGU)–Jember (JR)	2016–
163-164	Gumarang	PT. Kereta Api Indonesia (persero) Operation Area 8 Surabaya	Jakarta Pasar Senen (PSE)–Semarang Tawang (SMT)–Surabaya Pasar Turi (SBI)	2001–
165-166	Dharmawangsa	PT. Kereta Api Indonesia (persero) Operation Area 1 Jakarta	Jakarta Pasar Senen (PSE)–Semarang Tawang (SMT)–Surabaya Pasar Turi (SBI)	2019–
171-174	Ciremai	PT. Kereta Api Indonesia (persero) Operation Area 4 Semarang	Semarang Tawang (SMT)–Cirebon (CN)–Bandung (BD)	2013–
175-177	Menoreh	PT. Kereta Api Indonesia (Persero) Operation Area 4 Semarang	Semarang Tawang (SMT) - Jakarta Pasar Senen (PSE)	2012-
178-180	Tawang Jaya Premium	PT. Kereta Api Indonesia (Persero) Operation Area 4 Semarang	Jakarta Pasar Senen (PSE) - Semarang Tawang (SMT)	2018-
181–184, 190-191, 194-199	Kamandaka	PT. Kereta Api Indonesia (persero) Operation Area 5 Purwokerto	Semarang Tawang (SMT)–Tegal (TG)–Purwokerto (PWT)	2014–
185–189, 192–193, 201-202	Joglosemarkerto	PT. Kereta Api Indonesia (persero) Operation Area 6 Yogyakarta	Solo Balapan (SLO)–Yogyakarta (YK)–Purwokerto (PWT)–Tegal (TG)–Semarang Tawang (SMT)	2015–
203-204	Tegal Bahari	PT. Kereta Api Indonesia (persero) Operation Area 1 Jakarta	Tegal (TG) - Cirebon Prujakan (CNP) - Jakarta Pasar Senen (PSE)	2013-
205F-208F	Baturraden Express	PT. Kereta Api Indonesia (persero) Operation Area 5 Purwokerto	Purwokerto (PWT)–Kroya (KYA)–Bandung (BD)	2021–
209-212F	Mutiara Timur	PT. Kereta Api Indonesia (persero) Operation Area 9 Jember	Yogyakarta (YK)–Surabaya Gubeng (SGU)–Jember (JR)–Banyuwangi Ketapang (KTG)	1972–
213-222F	Kaligung	PT. Kereta Api Indonesia (persero) Operation Area 4 Semarang	Cirebon Prujakan (CNP)–Brebes (BB) –Tegal (TG)–Semarang Poncol (SMC)	2016–
223-230	Pangrango	PT. Kereta Api Indonesia (persero) Operation Area 1 Jakarta	Bogor (BOO)–Sukabumi (SI)	2013–

=== Business and economy class ===
Effective 18 September 2024, The last Train to use Business and Economy Class cars, the Logawa, changed to only using Economy New Generation Class coaches.

== Economy class ==
=== Premium economy class ===
Train Number	Train name	Operator	Train endpoints	Operated
253-254	Jayakarta	PT. Kereta Api Indonesia (persero) Operation Area 1 Jakarta	Jakarta Pasar Senen (PSE) - Purwokerto (PWT) - Yogyakarta (YK) - Madiun (MN) - Surabaya Gubeng (SGU)	2017-
255-256	Kertajaya	PT. Kereta Api Indonesia (persero) Operation Area 8 Surabaya	Surabaya Pasar Turi (SBI) - Semarang Poncol (SMC) - Jakarta Pasar Senen (PSE)	2002-
	Logawa	PT. Kereta Api Indonesia (persero) Operation Area 5 Purwokerto	Purwokerto (PWT)–Yogyakarta Lempuyangan (LPN)–Madiun (MN)–Surabaya Gubeng (SGU)–Jember (JR)	1999–
259F-260F	Kutojaya Utara	PT. Kereta Api Indonesia (persero) Operation Area 5 Purwokerto	Kutoarjo (KTA) - Purwokerto (PWT) - Jakarta Kota (JAKK)	1977-
267-268	Ambarawa Express	PT. Kereta Api Indonesia (persero) Operation Area 8 Surabaya	Surabaya Pasar Turi (SBI) - Semarang Tawang (SMT) - Semarang Poncol (SMC)	2022-
S5-S8	Kuala Stabas	PT. Kereta Api Indonesia (Persero) Regional Division IV Tanjungkarang	Tanjung Karang (TNK) - Baturaja (BTA)	2018-

=== Economy plus class ===
Train Number	Train name	Operator	Train endpoints	Operated
251-252	Majapahit	PT. Kereta Api Indonesia (Persero) Operation Area 8 Surabaya	Jakarta Pasar Senen (PSE) - Semarang Tawang (SMT) - Madiun (MN) - Malang (ML)	2009-
257-258	Jaka Tingkir	PT. Kereta Api Indonesia (Persero) Operation Area 6 Yogyakarta	Solo Purwosari (PWS) - Yogyakarta Lempuyangan (LPN) - Purwokerto (PWT) - Jakarta Pasar Senen (PSE)	2013-
269F-270F	Ambarawa Express	PT. Kereta Api Indonesia (Persero) Operation Area 4 Semarang	Semarang Poncol (SMC) - Semarang Tawang (SMT) - Surabaya Pasar Turi (SBI)	2016-
7047-7048	Cikuray	PT. Kereta Api Indonesia (Persero) Operation Area 1 Jakarta	Garut (GRT) - Bandung (BD) - Jakarta Pasar Senen (PSE)	2022-

=== Economy class ===
Some trains in this class are subsidized by the government through a public service obligation.

Known as: PSO class, non-commercial economy class, subsidized economy class.

Train Number	Train name	Operator	Train endpoints	Operated
281-282	Matarmaja	PT. Kereta Api Indonesia (persero) Operation Area 8 Surabaya	Malang (ML) - Madiun (MN) - Semarang Tawang (SMT) - Jakarta Pasar Senen (PSE)	1983-
283-284	Kahuripan	PT. Kereta Api Indonesia (persero) Operation Area 2 Bandung	Blitar (BL) - Madiun (MN) - Yogyakarta Lempuyangan (LPN) - Bandung Kiaracondong (KAC)	1995-
285-286	Pasundan	PT. Kereta Api Indonesia (persero) Operation Area 2 Bandung	Surabaya Gubeng (SGU) - Madiun (MN) - Yogyakarta Lempuyangan (LPN) - Bandung Kiaracondong (KAC)	1997-
287-290	Sri Tanjung	PT. Kereta Api Indonesia (persero) Operation Area 9 Jember	Banyuwangi Ketapang (KTG) - Jember (JR) - Surabaya Kota (SB) - Madiun (MN) - Yogyakarta Lempuyangan (LPN)	1995-
291-292	Bengawan	PT. Kereta Api Indonesia (persero) Operation Area 6 Yogyakarta	Purwosari (PWS) - Yogyakarta Lempuyangan (LPN) - Purwokerto (PWT) - Jakarta Pasar Senen (PSE)	1966-
293-294	Progo	PT. Kereta Api Indonesia (persero) Operation Area 1 Jakarta	Yogyakarta Lempuyangan (LPN) - Purwokerto (PWT) - Jakarta Pasar Senen (PSE)	2002-
301-308	Serayu	PT. Kereta Api Indonesia (persero) Operation Area 5 Purwokerto	Purwokerto (PWT) - Kroya (KYA) - Bandung Kiaracondong (KAC) - Jakarta Pasar Senen (PSE)	1985-
309-310	Tawang Jaya	PT. Kereta Api Indonesia (persero) Operation Area 4 Semarang	Semarang Poncol (SMC) - Cirebon Prujakan (CNP) - Jakarta Pasar Senen (PSE)	1984-
311-312	Kutojaya Selatan	PT. Kereta Api Indonesia (persero) Operation Area 5 Purwokerto	Kutoarjo (KTA) - Bandung Kiaracondong (KAC)	1977-
313-316	Tawang Alun	PT. Kereta Api Indonesia (persero) Operation Area 9 Jember	Banyuwangi Ketapang (KTG) - Jember (JR) - Malang Kota Lama (MLK)	2000-
317-318	Probowangi	PT. Kereta Api Indonesia (persero) Operation Area 8 Surabaya	Banyuwangi Ketapang (KTG) - Jember (JR) - Surabaya Gubeng (SGU)	2014-
7049-7050	Airlangga	PT. Kereta Api Indonesia (Persero) Operation Area 8 Surabaya	Surabaya Pasar Turi (SBI) - Semarang Poncol (SMC) - Jakarta Pasar Senen (PSE)	2021-
U65-U70	Putri Deli	PT. Kereta Api Indonesia (persero) Regional Division I Sumatera Utara and Aceh	Medan (MDN) - Tanjung Balai (TNB)	2008-
U71-U72	Siantar Express	PT. Kereta Api Indonesia (persero) Regional Division I Sumatera Utara and Aceh	Medan (MDN) - Siantar (SIR)	
S9-S10	Bukit Serelo	PT. Kereta Api Indonesia (persero) Regional Division III Palembang	Kertapati (KPT) - Lubuk Linggau (LLG)	2000-
S11-S12	Rajabasa	PT. Kereta Api Indonesia (persero) Regional Division IV Tanjung Karang	Kertapati (KPT) - Tanjung Karang (TNK)	

=== Local economy class/Commuter (some currently operated by KAI Commuter) ===
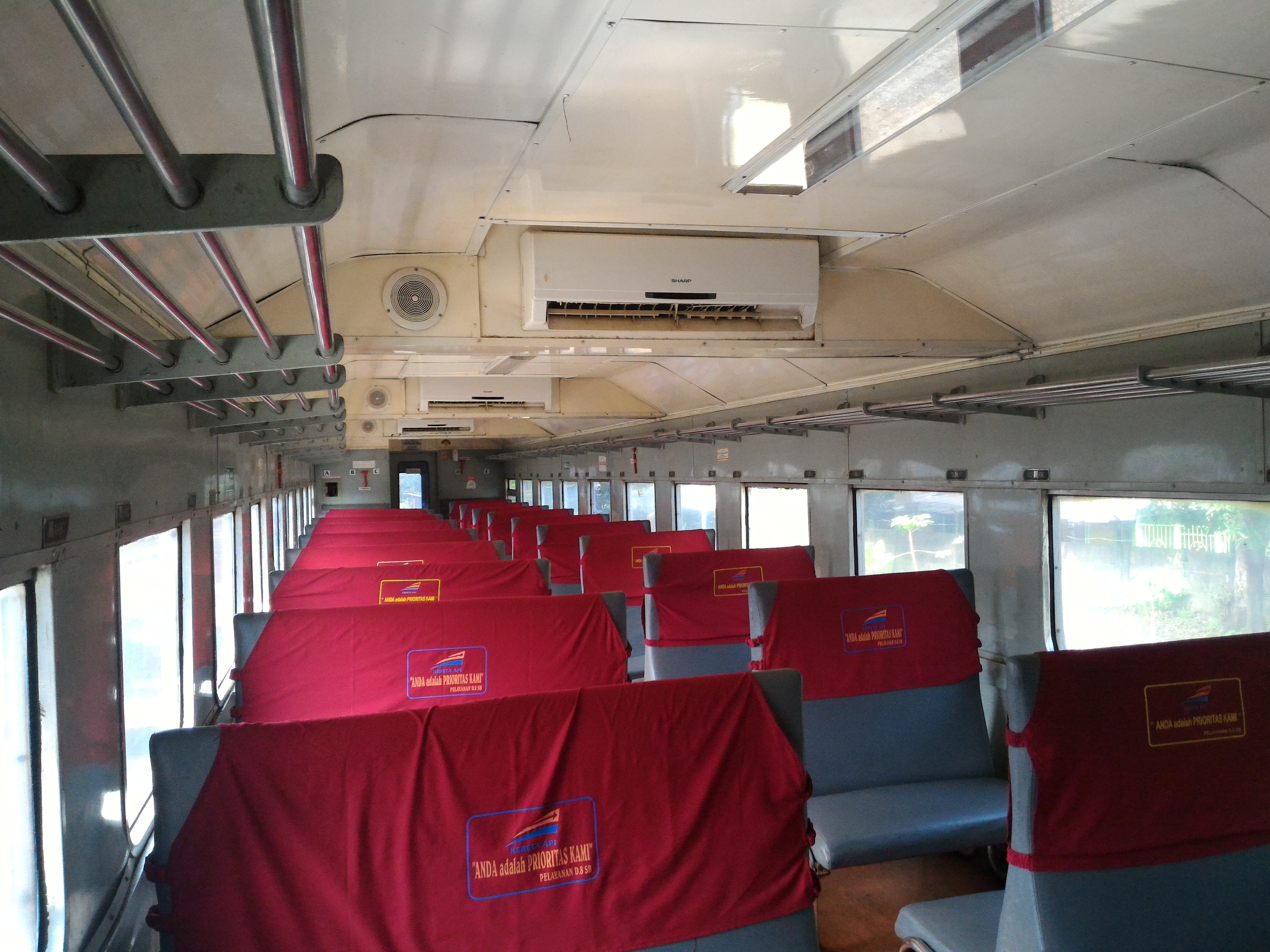
Interior of Economy PSO Class KRD Bojonegoro Train

- Blora Jaya (Semarang Poncol - Cepu)
- Jatiluhur (Cikampek - Cikarang)
- Walahar (Purwakarta - Cikarang)
- Arjonegoro (Sidoarjo - Surabaya Pasar Turi - Bojonegoro)
- Lokal Bandung Raya (Padalarang - Bandung - Cicalengka)
- Pandanwangi (Jember - Ketapang)
- Penataran (Surabaya Kota - Malang - Blitar)
- Rapih Dhoho (Surabaya Kota - Kertosono - Blitar)
- Sibinuang (Padang - Naras)
- Simandra/Lokal Cibatu (Cibatu - Purwakarta)

=== Agglomeration ===
Local and agglomeration trains
Train name	Travel relation	Travel frequency	Type of train	Train depot	Start of operation (according to service name)	Description	Image
Blora Jaya	Semarang Poncol-Cepu	1 departure	Light steel	Semarang Poncol (SMC)	July 5, 2017	—	
Siliwangi	Sukabumi-Cipatat	3 departures	Light steel	Jakarta Kota (JAKK)	February 8, 2014	—	
Pandanwangi	Jember-Ketapang	2 departures	Light steel	Ketapang (KTG)	—	—	

=== Commuter, Local, and Airport services ===
==== East Java ====
Symbol	Frequency (times)/ interval (minutes)	KA name	Route	The path traveled	Category	Operator	Regular fleet
		Lin Jenggala	Surabaya City – Surabaya Gubeng – Mojokerto – Sidoarjo	Surabaya Line Kertosono–Wonokromo Tarik–Sidoarjo	Commuter trains	KAI Commuter Region 8	KRDI (MH201 )
		Lin Supas	Surabaya City – Surabaya Gubeng – Sidoarjo – Bangil – Pasuruan	Lintas Surabaya Wonokromo–Bangil Bangil–Kalisat	Local trains	KAI Commuter Region 8	GE U18C (CC201), GE U20C (CC203), K3
		Penataran Line	Surabaya City – Surabaya Gubeng – Sidoarjo – Bangil – Malang – Blitar	Surabaya Crossroads Wonokromo–Bangil Kertosono–Bangil	Local trains	KAI Commuter Region 8	GE U18C (CC201), GE U20C (CC203), K3
		Lin Dhoho	Surabaya City – Surabaya Gubeng – Mojokerto – Kertosono – Blitar	Surabaya Cross-train line Kertosono–Wonokromo Kertosono–Bangil	Local trains	KAI Commuter Region 8	GE U18C ( CC201), GE U20C (CC203), K3
		Lin Arjonegoro	Sidoarjo – Surabaya Gubeng – Surabaya Pasarturi – Bojonegoro	Gambringan–Surabaya Pasarturi Surabaya-crossing Wonokromo–Bangil	Local trains	KAI Commuter Region 8	KRDI (MH201)
		Lin Blorasura	Surabaya Pasarturi – Bojonegoro – Cepu	Gambringan–Surabaya Pasarturi	Local trains	KAI Commuter Region 8	GE U18C (CC201), GE U20C (CC203), K3
		Pandanwangi	Jember – Banyuwangi – Ketapang	Bangil–Kalisat Kalisat–Banyuwangi	Local trains	KAI Daop 9	GE U18C (CC201), GE U20C (CC203), K3

==== South Sulawesi ====
Symbol	Frequency (times)/ interval (minutes)	KA name	Route	The path traveled	Category	Operator	Regular fleet
		Andalan Celebes	Garongkong – Barru – Ma'rang – Mangilu	Branching to Garongkong Harbor Makassar–Parepare railway line Branching to the Tonasa Cement Factory	Local trains	KAI Daop 8, South Sulawesi Citra Indonesia	KRDE INKA (ME2XX)
		Lontara	Garongkong – Barru – Ma'rang – Mandai	Branching to Garongkong Harbor Makassar–Parepare railway line	Local trains	KAI Daop 8, South Sulawesi Citra Indonesia	KRDE INKA (ME2XX)

== Diesel multiple units ==
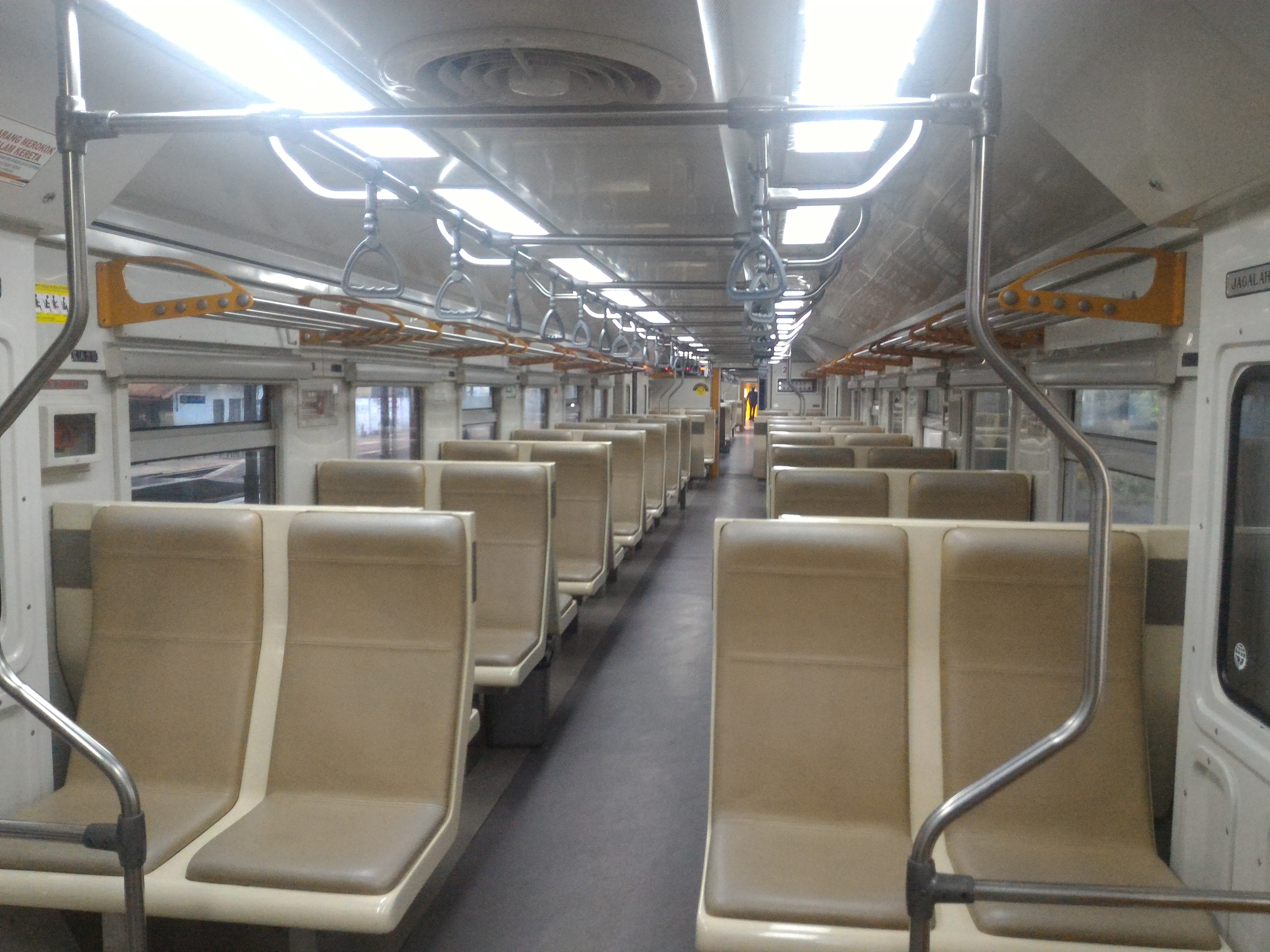
Jenggala KRDI AC Train Interior

=== Air-conditioned ===
- Cepu Express
- Komuter Jenggala
- Kedung Sepur
- Komuter Sulam
- Madiun Jaya Express
- Minangkabau Express
- Prambanan Express
- Komuter Supor

=== Railbus ===
- Batara Kresna
- Kertalaya
- Lembah Anai

== KAI Airport Services ==
- Adisumarmo Airport Rail Link
- Kualanamu Airport Rail Link
- Minangkabau Express
- Soekarno–Hatta Airport Rail Link
- Yogyakarta International Airport Rail Link

== KAI Commuter ==
=== Electric train ===
==== Greater Jakarta ====
- Central Line
- Cikarang Loop Line
- Loop Line
- Rangkasbitung Line
- Tangerang Line
- Tanjung Priok Line

==== Greater Yogyakarta and Surakarta ====
- Yogyakarta Line

== Non-commercial ==
- Kereta api Baja Coil
- Kereta api Indocement
- Kereta api penolong
- Kereta api angkutan galon Aqua
- Rail One
- Rail Clinic
- Kereta Pustaka Indonesia
- ONS Cargo (Parcel Utara, Parcel Tengah, Parcel Selatan (Northern, Middle, and Southern Parcel))
- Wijayakusuma
- Wisata Danau Singkarak

== Seasonal train ==
- Baturraden Express
- Motis Utara
- Motis Selatan

=== Non-air-conditioned ===
- Sri Lelawangsa
- Way Umpu
- Seminung
- Cut Meutia

== Route ==
=== Java and Northern Sumatra ===
The following is a list of intercity train service stops on Java and Northern Sumatra according to Gapeka 2023, excluding Jatinegara Station for passenger arrivals from the originating station.

==== Java ====
===== Intercity =====
====== South Java line ======
DKI Jakarta and West Java (Note: Except for Regency–Bekasi City, Regency–Bogor City, and Depok City which are the regencies and cities supporting DKI Jakarta.) to Central Java–DI Yogyakarta and East Java via Bandung
Name	Class	Relation	Frequency	Stopping stations
Baturraden Express	Executive	Bandung–Purwokerto	1x	Kiaracondong, Cipeundeuy, Tasikmalaya, Ciamis, Banjar, Sidareja, Jeruklegi, Maos, Kroya
Baturraden Express	Business	Bandung–Purwokerto	1x	Kiaracondong, Cipeundeuy, Tasikmalaya, Ciamis, Banjar, Sidareja, Jeruklegi, Maos, Kroya
Kutojaya Selatan	Economy	Kiaracondong–Kutoarjo	1x	Cipeundeuy, Tasikmalaya, Ciamis, Banjar, Sidareja, Gandrungmangun, Jeruklegi, Maos, Kroya, Sumpiuh, Gombong, Karanganyar, Kebumen, Kutowinangun
Serayu	Economy	Pasar Senen–Purwokerto via Kiaracondong	1x	Bekasi, Cikarang, Karawang, Cikampek, Purwakarta, Cimahi, Kiaracondong, Leles, Cibatu, Cipeundeuy, Tasikmalaya, Ciamis, Banjar, Sidareja, Gandrungmangun, Jeruklegi, Maos, Kroya
Lodaya	Executive	Bandung–Solo Balapan	2x	Kiaracondong, Cipeundeuy, Tasikmalaya, Ciamis, Banjar, Sidareja, Maos, Kroya, Gombong, Kebumen, Kutoarjo, Wates, Yogyakarta, Klaten; Lodaya Malam heading to Surakarta only stops at Cibatu Station, while the opposite direction is only on the morning schedule.
Lodaya	Economy	Bandung–Solo Balapan	2x	Kiaracondong, Cipeundeuy, Tasikmalaya, Ciamis, Banjar, Sidareja, Maos, Kroya, Gombong, Kebumen, Kutoarjo, Wates, Yogyakarta, Klaten; Lodaya Malam heading to Surakarta only stops at Cibatu Station, while the opposite direction is only on the morning schedule.
Pasundan	Economy	Kiaracondong–Surabaya Gubeng	1x	Leles, Cibatu, Cipeundeuy, Tasikmalaya, Ciamis, Banjar, Sidareja, Maos, Kroya, Gombong, Kebumen, Kutoarjo, Wates, Lempuyangan, Klaten, Purwosari, Sragen, Walikukun, Ngawi, Madiun, Caruban, Nganjuk, Kertosono, Jombang, Mojokerto
Argo Wilis	Panoramic	Bandung–Surabaya Gubeng	1x	Cipeundeuy, Tasikmalaya, Ciamis, Banjar, Kroya, Kutoarjo, Yogyakarta, Solo Balapan, Madiun, Kertosono, Jombang, Mojokerto
Argo Wilis	Executive	Bandung–Surabaya Gubeng	1x	Cipeundeuy, Tasikmalaya, Ciamis, Banjar, Kroya, Kutoarjo, Yogyakarta, Solo Balapan, Madiun, Kertosono, Jombang, Mojokerto
Turangga	Panoramic	Bandung–Surabaya Gubeng	1x	Cipeundeuy, Tasikmalaya, Ciamis, Banjar, Kroya, Kebumen, Kutoarjo, Yogyakarta, Solo Balapan, Madiun, Nganjuk, Kertosono, Jombang, Mojokerto
Turangga	Executive	Bandung–Surabaya Gubeng	1x	Cipeundeuy, Tasikmalaya, Ciamis, Banjar, Kroya, Kebumen, Kutoarjo, Yogyakarta, Solo Balapan, Madiun, Nganjuk, Kertosono, Jombang, Mojokerto
Mutiara Selatan	Executive	Bandung–Surabaya Gubeng	1x	Kiaracondong, Cipeundeuy, Tasikmalaya, Ciamis, Banjar, Sidareja, Maos, Kroya, Gombong, Kebumen, Kutoarjo, Yogyakarta, Madiun, Nganjuk, Kertosono, Jombang, Mojokerto
Mutiara Selatan	Premium Economy	Bandung–Surabaya Gubeng	1x	Kiaracondong, Cipeundeuy, Tasikmalaya, Ciamis, Banjar, Sidareja, Maos, Kroya, Gombong, Kebumen, Kutoarjo, Yogyakarta, Madiun, Nganjuk, Kertosono, Jombang, Mojokerto
Kahuripan	Economy	Kiaracondong–Blitar	1x	Leles, Cipeundeuy, Tasikmalaya, Ciamis, Banjar, Sidareja, Gandrungmangun, Maos, Kroya, Gombong (downstream only), Karanganyar (upstream only), Kebumen, Kutoarjo, Wates, Lempuyangan, Klaten, Purwosari, Sragen, Walikukun, Ngawi, Magetan, Madiun, Caruban, Nganjuk, Kertosono, Papar, Kediri, Tulungagung
Malabar	Executive	Bandung–Malang	2x	Kiaracondong, Cipeundeuy, Tasikmalaya, Banjar, Maos, Kroya, Kebumen, Kutoarjo, Yogyakarta, Solo Balapan, Ngawi, Madiun, Nganjuk, Kertosono, Kediri, Tulungagung, Blitar, Kepanjen, Malang Old Town; Malabar Pagi only stops at Sidareja Station (towards Malang), Gandrungmangun (towards Malang), Klaten, and Sumberpucung (towards Bandung).; Malabar Malam only stops at Leles Station, Ciamis, Sidareja (towards Bandung), Gombong, Klaten (towards Malang), and Wlingi.
Malabar	Premium Economy	Bandung–Malang	2x	Kiaracondong, Cipeundeuy, Tasikmalaya, Banjar, Maos, Kroya, Kebumen, Kutoarjo, Yogyakarta, Solo Balapan, Ngawi, Madiun, Nganjuk, Kertosono, Kediri, Tulungagung, Blitar, Kepanjen, Malang Old Town; Malabar Pagi only stops at Sidareja Station (towards Malang), Gandrungmangun (towards Malang), Klaten, and Sumberpucung (towards Bandung).; Malabar Malam only stops at Leles Station, Ciamis, Sidareja (towards Bandung), Gombong, Klaten (towards Malang), and Wlingi.
DKI Jakarta to West Java
Name	Class	Relation	Frequency	Stopping stations
Parahyangan	Panoramic	Gambir–Bandung	4x	Jatinegara, Bekasi, Cimahi; Departures to Jakarta are only departed on the morning schedule, while the opposite is at night; Departures on the afternoon schedule use the Mulitah Selatan series owned by the Sidotopo Main Depot without the accompanying train series Panoramic.; Argo Parahyangan Executive uses the Argo Wilis train, Turangga, and Gajayana series with different schedules.
Parahyangan	Executive	Gambir–Bandung	4x	Jatinegara, Bekasi, Cimahi; Departures to Jakarta are only departed on the morning schedule, while the opposite is at night; Departures on the afternoon schedule use the Mulitah Selatan series owned by the Sidotopo Main Depot without the accompanying train series Panoramic.; Argo Parahyangan Executive uses the Argo Wilis train, Turangga, and Gajayana series with different schedules.
Parahyangan	Premium Economy	Gambir–Bandung	4x	Jatinegara, Bekasi, Cimahi; Departures to Jakarta are only departed on the morning schedule, while the opposite is at night; Departures on the afternoon schedule use the Mulitah Selatan series owned by the Sidotopo Main Depot without the accompanying train series Panoramic.; Argo Parahyangan Executive uses the Argo Wilis train, Turangga, and Gajayana series with different schedules.
Cikuray	Economy	Pasar Senen–Garut	1x	Bekasi, Cikarang, Karawang, Cikampek, Purwakarta, Cimahi, Bandung, Kiaracondong, Leles, Cibatu
Papandayan	Panoramic	Gambir–Garut	1x	Bekasi, Karawang, Cimahi, Bandung, Kiaracondong, Leles (upstream only), Cibatu, Wanaraja (downstream only)
Papandayan	Executive	Gambir–Garut	1x	Bekasi, Karawang, Cimahi, Bandung, Kiaracondong, Leles (upstream only), Cibatu, Wanaraja (downstream only)
Papandayan	Premium Economy	Gambir–Garut	1x	Bekasi, Karawang, Cimahi, Bandung, Kiaracondong, Leles (upstream only), Cibatu, Wanaraja (downstream only)
Pangandaran	Panoramic	Gambir–Banjar	1x	Bekasi, Cimahi, Bandung, Kiaracondong, Leles (upstream only), Cibatu, Cipeundeuy, Tasikmalaya, Ciamis
Pangandaran	Executive	Gambir–Banjar	1x	Bekasi, Cimahi, Bandung, Kiaracondong, Leles (upstream only), Cibatu, Cipeundeuy, Tasikmalaya, Ciamis
Pangandaran	Premium Economy	Gambir–Banjar	1x	Bekasi, Cimahi, Bandung, Kiaracondong, Leles (upstream only), Cibatu, Cipeundeuy, Tasikmalaya, Ciamis
DKI Jakarta to Central Java and Special Region of Yogyakarta via Purwokerto
Name	Class	Relation	Frequency	Stopping stations
Sawunggalih	Executive	Pasar Senen–Kutoarjo	2x	Bekasi, Cikarang (downstream direction only), Cirebon, Prupuk, Bumiayu, Purwokerto, Kroya, Sumpiuh, Gombong, Karanganyar, Kebumen; Sawunggalih Pagi only stops at Haurgeulis Station (towards Jakarta), Terisi (towards Kutoarjo), Jatibarang (towards Kutoarjo), Ciledug, and Kutowinangun (towards Jakarta).; Sawunggalih Night towards Kutoarjo only stops at Kutowinangun Station.
Sawunggalih	Premium Economy	Pasar Senen–Kutoarjo	2x	Bekasi, Cikarang (downstream direction only), Cirebon, Prupuk, Bumiayu, Purwokerto, Kroya, Sumpiuh, Gombong, Karanganyar, Kebumen; Sawunggalih Pagi only stops at Haurgeulis Station (towards Jakarta), Terisi (towards Kutoarjo), Jatibarang (towards Kutoarjo), Ciledug, and Kutowinangun (towards Jakarta).; Sawunggalih Night towards Kutoarjo only stops at Kutowinangun Station.
Kutojaya Utara	Premium Economy	Jakarta Kota–Kutoarjo	1x	Pasar Senen, Bekasi, Cikarang (downstream direction only), Karawang (downstream direction only), Pegaden Baru, Haurgeulis, Jatibarang, Cirebon Prujakan, Ciledug (downstream direction only), Prupuk, Bumiayu, Purwokerto, Kroya, Sumpiuh, Gombong, Karanganyar, Kebumen, Kutowinangun (upstream direction only)
Fajar and Senja Utama Yogya	Priority	Pasar Senen–Yogyakarta	2x	Bekasi, Cirebon, Bumiayu, Purwokerto, Kroya, Gombong, Kebumen, Kutoarjo, Wates; Fajar Utama Yogyakarta only stops at Cikampek Station (towards Yogyakarta), Terisi (towards Yogyakarta), Jatibarang (towards Jakarta), Ciledug (towards Yogyakarta), and Ketanggungan.; Senja Utama Yogyakarta heading to Yogyakarta only stops at Jatibarang Station.
Fajar and Senja Utama Yogya	Executive	Pasar Senen–Yogyakarta	2x	Bekasi, Cirebon, Bumiayu, Purwokerto, Kroya, Gombong, Kebumen, Kutoarjo, Wates; Fajar Utama Yogyakarta only stops at Cikampek Station (towards Yogyakarta), Terisi (towards Yogyakarta), Jatibarang (towards Jakarta), Ciledug (towards Yogyakarta), and Ketanggungan.; Senja Utama Yogyakarta heading to Yogyakarta only stops at Jatibarang Station.
Fajar and Senja Utama Yogya	Premium Economy	Pasar Senen–Yogyakarta	2x	Bekasi, Cirebon, Bumiayu, Purwokerto, Kroya, Gombong, Kebumen, Kutoarjo, Wates; Fajar Utama Yogyakarta only stops at Cikampek Station (towards Yogyakarta), Terisi (towards Yogyakarta), Jatibarang (towards Jakarta), Ciledug (towards Yogyakarta), and Ketanggungan.; Senja Utama Yogyakarta heading to Yogyakarta only stops at Jatibarang Station.
Taksaka	Luxury	Gambir–Yogyakarta	2x	Cirebon, Purwokerto, Kroya, Kebumen, Kutoarjo
Taksaka	Executive	Gambir–Yogyakarta	2x	Cirebon, Purwokerto, Kroya, Kebumen, Kutoarjo
Gajahwong	Priority	Pasar Senen–Lempuyangan	1x	Bekasi, Jatibarang, Cirebon Prujakan, Prupuk (upstream only), Purwokerto, Kroya, Gombong, Kebumen, Kutoarjo, Wates
Gajahwong	Executive	Pasar Senen–Lempuyangan	1x	Bekasi, Jatibarang, Cirebon Prujakan, Prupuk (upstream only), Purwokerto, Kroya, Gombong, Kebumen, Kutoarjo, Wates
Gajahwong	Economy	Pasar Senen–Lempuyangan	1x	Bekasi, Jatibarang, Cirebon Prujakan, Prupuk (upstream only), Purwokerto, Kroya, Gombong, Kebumen, Kutoarjo, Wates
Bogowonto	Priority	Pasar Senen–Lempuyangan	1x	Bekasi, Cikarang, Jatibarang, Cirebon Prujakan, Bumiayu, Purwokerto, Kroya, Gombong, Kebumen, Kutoarjo, Wates, Yogyakarta
Bogowonto	Executive	Pasar Senen–Lempuyangan	1x	Bekasi, Cikarang, Jatibarang, Cirebon Prujakan, Bumiayu, Purwokerto, Kroya, Gombong, Kebumen, Kutoarjo, Wates, Yogyakarta
Bogowonto	Premium Economy	Pasar Senen–Lempuyangan	1x	Bekasi, Cikarang, Jatibarang, Cirebon Prujakan, Bumiayu, Purwokerto, Kroya, Gombong, Kebumen, Kutoarjo, Wates, Yogyakarta
Progo	Economy	Pasar Senen–Lempuyangan	1x	Bekasi, Haurgeulis (upstream direction only), Cirebon Prujakan, Ketanggungan (upstream direction only), Prupuk (upstream direction only), Purwokerto, Kroya, Gombong, Karanganyar (upstream direction only), Kebumen, Kutoarjo, Wates
Jaka Tingkir	Economy	Pasar Senen–Purwosari	1x	Cikarang, Haurgeulis, Jatibarang, Cirebon Prujakan, Bumiayu, Purwokerto, Kroya, Gombong, Kebumen, Kutoarjo, Wates, Lempuyangan, Klaten
Bengawan	Economy	Pasar Senen–Purwosari	1x	Bekasi, Cikarang, Pegaden Baru, Cirebon Prujakan, Prupuk (downstream direction only), Bumiayu (upstream direction only), Purwokerto, Kroya, Gombong, Kebumen, Kutoarjo, Wates, Lempuyangan, Klaten
Fajar and Senja Utama Solo	Executive	Pasar Senen–Solo Balapan	1x	Bekasi, Cirebon, Purwokerto, Kroya, Karanganyar, Kutoarjo, Wates, Yogyakarta, Klaten; Solo's Dawn only stops at Haurgeulis Station and Jatibarang; Solo's Sunset only stops at Sumpiuh Station
Fajar and Senja Utama Solo	Premium Economy	Pasar Senen–Solo Balapan	1x	Bekasi, Cirebon, Purwokerto, Kroya, Karanganyar, Kutoarjo, Wates, Yogyakarta, Klaten; Solo's Dawn only stops at Haurgeulis Station and Jatibarang; Solo's Sunset only stops at Sumpiuh Station
Mataram	Executive	Pasar Senen–Solo Balapan	1x	Bekasi, Haurgeulis (upstream only), Jatibarang, Cirebon, Bumiayu, Purwokerto, Kroya, Gombong, Kebumen, Kutoarjo, Wates, Yogyakarta, Klaten
Mataram	Economy	Pasar Senen–Solo Balapan	1x	Bekasi, Haurgeulis (upstream only), Jatibarang, Cirebon, Bumiayu, Purwokerto, Kroya, Gombong, Kebumen, Kutoarjo, Wates, Yogyakarta, Klaten
Argo Lawu	Luxury	Gambir–Solo Balapan	1x	Cirebon, Purwokerto, Yogyakarta, Klaten
Argo Lawu	Executive	Gambir–Solo Balapan	1x	Cirebon, Purwokerto, Yogyakarta, Klaten
Argo Dwipangga	Luxury	Gambir–Solo Balapan	1x	Jatinegara (downstream only), Cirebon, Purwokerto, Yogyakarta, Klaten
Argo Dwipangga	Executive	Gambir–Solo Balapan	1x	Jatinegara (downstream only), Cirebon, Purwokerto, Yogyakarta, Klaten
Manahan	Priority	Gambir–Solo Balapan	2x	Cikarang (morning schedule to Gambir only), Cirebon, Purwokerto, Kroya, Kutoarjo, Yogyakarta, Klaten; Morning Manahan to Surakarta stops at Kebumen Station, while the reverse is only on the evening schedule.
Manahan	Executive	Gambir–Solo Balapan	2x	Cikarang (morning schedule to Gambir only), Cirebon, Purwokerto, Kroya, Kutoarjo, Yogyakarta, Klaten; Morning Manahan to Surakarta stops at Kebumen Station, while the reverse is only on the evening schedule.
DKI Jakarta and West Java to East Java via Purwokerto
Name	Class	Relation	Frequency	Stopping stations
Bangunkarta	Executive	Pasar Senen–Jombang	1x	Cikarang, Pegaden Baru, Cirebon, Purwokerto, Kroya, Kutoarjo, Yogyakarta, Klaten, Solo Balapan, Sragen, Ngawi, Madiun, Caruban, Nganjuk, Kertosono; The Bangunkarta train to Jombang only stops at Haurgeulis, Bumiayu, Sumpiuh, and Karanganyar Stations. * Bangunkarta trains to Jakarta only stop at Kutowinangun, Kebumen, and Gombong stations.; Bangunkarta trains to Gambir only stop at Bekasi Station.
Bangunkarta	Economy	Pasar Senen–Jombang	1x	Cikarang, Pegaden Baru, Cirebon, Purwokerto, Kroya, Kutoarjo, Yogyakarta, Klaten, Solo Balapan, Sragen, Ngawi, Madiun, Caruban, Nganjuk, Kertosono; The Bangunkarta train to Jombang only stops at Haurgeulis, Bumiayu, Sumpiuh, and Karanganyar Stations. * Bangunkarta trains to Jakarta only stop at Kutowinangun, Kebumen, and Gombong stations.; Bangunkarta trains to Gambir only stop at Bekasi Station.
Ranggajati	Executive	Cirebon–Jember via Surabaya Gubeng	1x	Ciledug, Ketanggungan, Bumiayu, Purwokerto, Kroya, Gombong, Kebumen, Kutowinangun, Kutoarjo, Yogyakarta, Klaten, Solo Balapan, Sragen, Madiun, Nganjuk, Kertosono, Jombang, Mojokerto, Surabaya Gubeng, Sidoarjo, Bangil, Pasuruan, Probolinggo, Klakah, Tanggul, Rambipuji
Ranggajati	Economy	Cirebon–Jember via Surabaya Gubeng	1x	Ciledug, Ketanggungan, Bumiayu, Purwokerto, Kroya, Gombong, Kebumen, Kutowinangun, Kutoarjo, Yogyakarta, Klaten, Solo Balapan, Sragen, Madiun, Nganjuk, Kertosono, Jombang, Mojokerto, Surabaya Gubeng, Sidoarjo, Bangil, Pasuruan, Probolinggo, Klakah, Tanggul, Rambipuji
Gaya Baru Malam Selatan	Executive	Pasar Senen–Surabaya Gubeng	1x	Bekasi, Cikarang, Pegaden Baru (downstream direction only), Haurgeulis, Jatibarang, Arjawinangun, Cirebon Prujakan, Ciledug, Ketanggungan, Bumiayu, Purwokerto, Kroya, Gombong, Kebumen, Kutoarjo, Wates, Lempuyangan, Klaten, Purwosari, Sragen, Walikukun, Ngawi, Madiun, Caruban, Nganjuk, Kertosono, Jombang, Mojokerto, Wonokromo
Gaya Baru Malam Selatan	Economy	Pasar Senen–Surabaya Gubeng	1x	Bekasi, Cikarang, Pegaden Baru (downstream direction only), Haurgeulis, Jatibarang, Arjawinangun, Cirebon Prujakan, Ciledug, Ketanggungan, Bumiayu, Purwokerto, Kroya, Gombong, Kebumen, Kutoarjo, Wates, Lempuyangan, Klaten, Purwosari, Sragen, Walikukun, Ngawi, Madiun, Caruban, Nganjuk, Kertosono, Jombang, Mojokerto, Wonokromo
Jayakarta	Premium Economy	Pasar Senen–Surabaya Gubeng	1x	Bekasi, Cikarang, Cikampek (upstream direction only), Jatibarang, Cirebon, Prupuk, Purwokerto, Kroya, Karanganyar, Kebumen, Kutoarjo, Wates, Lempuyangan, Klaten, Solo Balapan, Sragen, Walikukun, Ngawi, Magetan, Madiun, Caruban, Nganjuk, Kertosono, Jombang, Mojokerto
Argo Semeru	Compartment Suite	Gambir–Surabaya Gubeng	1x	Bekasi, Cirebon, Purwokerto, Kroya, Kebumen, Kutoarjo, Yogyakarta, Solo Balapan, Madiun, Nganjuk, Kertosono, Jombang, Mojokerto
Argo Semeru	Executive	Gambir–Surabaya Gubeng	1x	Bekasi, Cirebon, Purwokerto, Kroya, Kebumen, Kutoarjo, Yogyakarta, Solo Balapan, Madiun, Nganjuk, Kertosono, Jombang, Mojokerto
Bima	Compartment Suite	Gambir–Surabaya Gubeng	1x	Cirebon, Purwokerto, Kroya, Kebumen, Kutoarjo, Yogyakarta, Solo Balapan, Madiun, Nganjuk, Kertosono, Jombang, Mojokerto
Bima	Executive	Gambir–Surabaya Gubeng	1x	Cirebon, Purwokerto, Kroya, Kebumen, Kutoarjo, Yogyakarta, Solo Balapan, Madiun, Nganjuk, Kertosono, Jombang, Mojokerto
Singasari	Executive	Pasar Senen–Blitar	1x	Bekasi, Cikarang (downstream direction only), Karawang, Cikampek, Haurgeulis, Cirebon, Prupuk, Bumiayu, Purwokerto, Kroya, Gombong, Kebumen, Kutoarjo, Wates, Lempuyangan, Klaten, Purwosari, Sragen (upstream direction only), Walikukun, Ngawi, Magetan, Madiun, Caruban, Nganjuk, Kertosono, Kediri, Tulungagung, Ngunut
Singasari	Economy	Pasar Senen–Blitar	1x	Bekasi, Cikarang (downstream direction only), Karawang, Cikampek, Haurgeulis, Cirebon, Prupuk, Bumiayu, Purwokerto, Kroya, Gombong, Kebumen, Kutoarjo, Wates, Lempuyangan, Klaten, Purwosari, Sragen (upstream direction only), Walikukun, Ngawi, Magetan, Madiun, Caruban, Nganjuk, Kertosono, Kediri, Tulungagung, Ngunut
Gajayana	Luxury	Gambir–Malang	1x	Bekasi, Cirebon, Purwokerto, Kroya, Kebumen, Kutoarjo, Yogyakarta, Solo Balapan, Madiun, Nganjuk, Kertosono, Kediri, Tulungagung, Blitar, Wlingi, Kepanjen
Gajayana	Executive	Gambir–Malang	1x	Bekasi, Cirebon, Purwokerto, Kroya, Kebumen, Kutoarjo, Yogyakarta, Solo Balapan, Madiun, Nganjuk, Kertosono, Kediri, Tulungagung, Blitar, Wlingi, Kepanjen
Central Java and Special Region of Yogyakarta to East Java
Name	Class	Relation	Frequency	Stopping stations
Sancaka	Executive	Yogyakarta–Surabaya Gubeng	4x	Klaten, Solo Balapan, Madiun, Nganjuk, Jombang, Mojokerto
Sancaka	Premium Economy	Yogyakarta–Surabaya Gubeng	4x	Klaten, Solo Balapan, Madiun, Nganjuk, Jombang, Mojokerto
Kertanegara	Executive	Purwokerto–Malang	1x	Kroya, Kebumen, Kutoarjo, Yogyakarta, Klaten, Solo Balapan, Sragen, Madiun, Caruban, Nganjuk, Kertosono, Kediri, Tulungagung, Blitar, Wlingi, Kesamben (direction to Purwokerto), Kepanjen, Malang Old Town
Kertanegara	Economy	Purwokerto–Malang	1x	Kroya, Kebumen, Kutoarjo, Yogyakarta, Klaten, Solo Balapan, Sragen, Madiun, Caruban, Nganjuk, Kertosono, Kediri, Tulungagung, Blitar, Wlingi, Kesamben (direction to Purwokerto), Kepanjen, Malang Old Town
Malioboro Express	Executive	Purwokerto–Malang	1x	Kroya, Kebumen, Kutoarjo, Yogyakarta, Klaten, Solo Balapan, Madiun, Caruban, Nganjuk, Kertosono, Kediri, Tulungagung, Blitar, Wlingi, Kepanjen, Malang Kotalama
Malioboro Express	Economy	Purwokerto–Malang	1x	Kroya, Kebumen, Kutoarjo, Yogyakarta, Klaten, Solo Balapan, Madiun, Caruban, Nganjuk, Kertosono, Kediri, Tulungagung, Blitar, Wlingi, Kepanjen, Malang Kotalama
Sri Tanjung	Economy	Lempuyangan–Banyuwangi via Surabaya City	1x	Klaten, Purwosari, Sragen, Walikukun, Ngawi, Magetan, Madiun, Caruban, Nganjuk, Kertosono, Jombang, Mojokerto, Krian (downstream direction only), Surabaya Gubeng, Surabaya City, Wonokromo, Waru (upstream direction only), Sidoarjo, Bangil, Pasuruan, Probolinggo, Tanggul, Rambipuji, Jember, Kalisat, Kalibaru, Kalisetail, Temuguruh, Rogojampi, Banyuwangi City
Logawa	Economy	Purwokerto–Jember via Surabaya Gubeng	1x	Kroya, Sumpiuh, Gombong, Karanganyar, Kebumen, Kutowinangun, Kutoarjo, Wates, Lempuyangan, Klaten, Purwosari, Sragen, Ngawi, Madiun, Caruban, Nganjuk, Kertosono, Jombang, Mojokerto, Surabaya Gubeng, Wonokromo, Sidoarjo, Bangil, Pasuruan, Probolinggo, Klakah, Tanggul, Rambipuji
Wijayakusuma	Executive	Cilacap–Ketapang via Surabaya Gubeng	1x	Gumilir, Maos, Kroya, Sumpiuh, Gombong, Kebumen, Kutowinangun (downstream direction only), Kutoarjo, Yogyakarta, Klaten, Solo Balapan, Sragen, Ngawi, Madiun, Nganjuk, Kertosono, Jombang, Mojokerto, Surabaya Gubeng, Sidoarjo, Bangil, Pasuruan, Probolinggo, Klakah, Tanggul, Rambipuji, Jember, Kalibaru, Kalisetail, Rogojampi, Banyuwangi City
Wijayakusuma	Premium Economy	Cilacap–Ketapang via Surabaya Gubeng	1x	Gumilir, Maos, Kroya, Sumpiuh, Gombong, Kebumen, Kutowinangun (downstream direction only), Kutoarjo, Yogyakarta, Klaten, Solo Balapan, Sragen, Ngawi, Madiun, Nganjuk, Kertosono, Jombang, Mojokerto, Surabaya Gubeng, Sidoarjo, Bangil, Pasuruan, Probolinggo, Klakah, Tanggul, Rambipuji, Jember, Kalibaru, Kalisetail, Rogojampi, Banyuwangi City
Malang–Banyuwangi
Name	Class	Relation	Frequency	Stopping stations
Tawang Alun	Malang Old Town–Banyuwangi	Economy	1x	Malang, Lawang, Bangil, Pasuruan, Probolinggo, Klakah, Jatiroto (downstream direction only), Tanggul, Rambipuji, Jember, Kalisat, Kalibaru, Kalisetail, Temuguruh, Rogojampi, Banyuwangi City

====== North Java Line ======
DKI Jakarta to West Java
Name	Class	Relation	Frequency	Stopping stations
Argo Cheribon	Executive	Gambir–Cirebon	2x	Bekasi, Cikampek (only trains 24–25), Haurgeulis, Terisi (downstream only), Jatibarang, Arjawinangun (only trains 24–25); The Argo Cheribon train can be extended to Tegal Station, serving Pegaden Baru Station (morning schedule only), Terisi (Tegal direction only), Babakan, Losari, and Brebes.
Argo Cheribon	Economy	Gambir–Cirebon	2x	Bekasi, Cikampek (only trains 24–25), Haurgeulis, Terisi (downstream only), Jatibarang, Arjawinangun (only trains 24–25); The Argo Cheribon train can be extended to Tegal Station, serving Pegaden Baru Station (morning schedule only), Terisi (Tegal direction only), Babakan, Losari, and Brebes.
DKI Jakarta and West Java to Central Java
Name	Class	Relation	Frequency	Stopping stations
Tegal Bahari	Executive	Pasar Senen–Tegal	1x	Bekasi, Cikarang, Jatibarang, Cirebon Prujakan, Babakan, Brebes
Tegal Bahari	Business	Pasar Senen–Tegal	1x	Bekasi, Cikarang, Jatibarang, Cirebon Prujakan, Babakan, Brebes
Argo Cheribon	Executive	Gambir–Tegal	2x	Bekasi, Pegaden Baru, (Note: Only morning schedule towards Tegal) Haurgeulis (only morning schedule), Terisi, Jatibarang, Cirebon, Babakan, Losari, Tanjung, Brebes
Argo Cheribon	Economy	Gambir–Tegal	2x	Bekasi, Pegaden Baru, Haurgeulis (only morning schedule), Terisi, Jatibarang, Cirebon, Babakan, Losari, Tanjung, Brebes
Tawang Jaya	Economy	Pasar Senen–Semarang Poncol	1x	Bekasi, Cikarang, Haurgeulis (downstream direction only), Jatibarang, Cirebon Prujakan, Babakan, Brebes, Tegal, Pemalang, Pekalongan, Weleri
Tawang Jaya	Executive	Pasar Senen–Semarang Tawang	1x	Bekasi, Cikarang, Jatibarang, Cirebon, Brebes, Tegal, Pemalang, Pekalongan, Weleri, Semarang Poncol
Tawang Jaya	Economy	Pasar Senen–Semarang Tawang	1x	Bekasi, Cikarang, Jatibarang, Cirebon, Brebes, Tegal, Pemalang, Pekalongan, Weleri, Semarang Poncol
Menoreh	Economy	Pasar Senen–Semarang Tawang	1x	Bekasi, Cikarang (downstream direction only), Pegaden Baru, Jatibarang, Cirebon Prujakan, Brebes, Tegal, Pemalang, Pekalongan, Batang, Weleri
Argo Sindoro	Executive	Gambir–Semarang Tawang	1xpm	Jatinegara (downstream only), Cirebon, Tegal, Pekalongan; Argo Sindoro Malam heading to Gambir only stops at Bekasi Station.
Argo Muria	Executive	Gambir–Semarang Tawang	2x	Bekasi, Cirebon, Tegal, Pekalongan
Argo Merbabu	Executive	Gambir–Semarang Tawang	1x	Bekasi (downstream only), Cirebon, Tegal, Pekalongan
Ciremai	Executive	Bandung–Semarang Tawang via Cirebon	1x	Cimahi, Purwakarta, Cikampek, Haurgeulis (downstream only), Jatibarang, Cirebon, Brebes, Tegal, Pemalang, Pekalongan, Weleri, Semarang Poncol
Ciremai	Economy	Bandung–Semarang Tawang via Cirebon	1x	Cimahi, Purwakarta, Cikampek, Haurgeulis (downstream only), Jatibarang, Cirebon, Brebes, Tegal, Pemalang, Pekalongan, Weleri, Semarang Poncol
DKI Jakarta and West Java to East Java
Name	Class	Relation	Frequency	Stopping stations
Gumarang	Executive	Pasar Senen–Surabaya Pasarturi	1x	Bekasi, Cirebon, Tegal, Pemalang, Pekalongan, Semarang Tawang, Ngrombo, Cepu, Bojonegoro, Babat, Lamongan
Gumarang	Business	Pasar Senen–Surabaya Pasarturi	1x	Bekasi, Cirebon, Tegal, Pemalang, Pekalongan, Semarang Tawang, Ngrombo, Cepu, Bojonegoro, Babat, Lamongan
Dharmawangsa Express	Executive	Pasar Senen–Surabaya Pasarturi	1x	Bekasi, Karawang (downstream direction only), Pegaden Baru, Haurgeulis (downstream direction only), Cirebon Prujakan, Tanjung, Brebes, Pekalongan, Weleri, Semarang Poncol (downstream direction only), Semarang Tawang, Ngrombo, Randublatung, Cepu, Bojonegoro, Babat, Lamongan
Dharmawangsa Express	Economy	Pasar Senen–Surabaya Pasarturi	1x	Bekasi, Karawang (downstream direction only), Pegaden Baru, Haurgeulis (downstream direction only), Cirebon Prujakan, Tanjung, Brebes, Pekalongan, Weleri, Semarang Poncol (downstream direction only), Semarang Tawang, Ngrombo, Randublatung, Cepu, Bojonegoro, Babat, Lamongan
Kertajaya	Premium Economy	Pasar Senen–Surabaya Pasarturi	1x	Bekasi, Cikarang, Haurgeulis, Jatibarang, Cirebon Prujakan, Brebes, Tegal, Weleri, Semarang Poncol, Ngrombo, Randublatung, Cepu, Bojonegoro, Babat, Lamongan
Airlangga	Economy	Pasar Senen–Surabaya Pasarturi	1x	Bekasi, Cikarang, Cikampek, Pegaden Baru, Haurgeulis, Jatibarang, Arjawinangun, Cirebon Prujakan, Babakan, Tanjung, Brebes, Tegal, Pemalang, Pekalongan, Weleri, Semarang Poncol, Ngrombo, Randublatung, Cepu, Bojonegoro, Babat, Lamongan
Argo Bromo Anggrek	Luxury	Gambir–Surabaya Pasarturi	2x	Cirebon, Pekalongan, Semarang Tawang, Bojonegoro
Argo Bromo Anggrek	Executive	Gambir–Surabaya Pasarturi	2x	Cirebon, Pekalongan, Semarang Tawang, Bojonegoro
Sembrani	Luxury	Gambir–Surabaya Pasarturi	2x	Bekasi, Cirebon, Tegal, Pekalongan, Semarang Tawang, Ngrombo (night schedule only), Cepu, Bojonegoro, Lamongan (night schedule only)
Sembrani	Executive	Gambir–Surabaya Pasarturi	2x	Bekasi, Cirebon, Tegal, Pekalongan, Semarang Tawang, Ngrombo (night schedule only), Cepu, Bojonegoro, Lamongan (night schedule only)
Harina	Executive	Bandung–Surabaya Pasarturi via Cirebon	1x	Cimahi, Purwakarta, Cikampek, Cirebon, Tegal, Pekalongan, Semarang Tawang, Ngrombo, Cepu, Bojonegoro, Babat, Lamongan
Harina	Premium Economy	Bandung–Surabaya Pasarturi via Cirebon	1x	Cimahi, Purwakarta, Cikampek, Cirebon, Tegal, Pekalongan, Semarang Tawang, Ngrombo, Cepu, Bojonegoro, Babat, Lamongan
Brantas	Executive	Pasar Senen–Blitar	1x	Bekasi, Haurgeulis (downstream direction only), Jatibarang, Cirebon Prujakan, Brebes, Tegal, Pekalongan, Semarang Tawang, Gundih, Solo Jebres, Sragen, Walikukun, Ngawi, Magetan, Madiun, Caruban, Nganjuk, Kertosono, Papar, Kediri, Tulungagung, Ngunut
Brantas	Economy	Pasar Senen–Blitar	1x	Bekasi, Haurgeulis (downstream direction only), Jatibarang, Cirebon Prujakan, Brebes, Tegal, Pekalongan, Semarang Tawang, Gundih, Solo Jebres, Sragen, Walikukun, Ngawi, Magetan, Madiun, Caruban, Nganjuk, Kertosono, Papar, Kediri, Tulungagung, Ngunut
Jayabaya	Executive	Senen Market–Malang via Surabaya Pasarturi	1x	Bekasi, Karawang, Cikampek, Haurgeulis (downstream only), Jatibarang, Cirebon, Tegal, Pemalang, Pekalongan, Weleri, Semarang Poncol, Ngrombo, Randublatung, Cepu, Bojonegoro, Babat, Lamongan, Surabaya Pasarturi, Surabaya Gubeng, Sidoarjo, Bangil, Lawang
Jayabaya	Economy	Senen Market–Malang via Surabaya Pasarturi	1x	Bekasi, Karawang, Cikampek, Haurgeulis (downstream only), Jatibarang, Cirebon, Tegal, Pemalang, Pekalongan, Weleri, Semarang Poncol, Ngrombo, Randublatung, Cepu, Bojonegoro, Babat, Lamongan, Surabaya Pasarturi, Surabaya Gubeng, Sidoarjo, Bangil, Lawang
Majapahit	Economy	Senen Market–Malang via Semarang Tawang	1x	Bekasi, Karawang (downstream direction only), Haurgeulis (Malang direction only), Cirebon Prujakan, Tegal, Pekalongan, Semarang Tawang, Solo Jebres, Sragen, Walikukun, Ngawi, Madiun, Nganjuk, Kertosono, Kediri, Tulungagung, Blitar, Wlingi, Kepanjen, Malang Old Town
Matarmaja	Economy	Senen Market–Malang via Semarang Tawang	1x	Bekasi, Pegaden Baru, Filled, Jatibarang, Cirebon Prujakan, Babakan, Brebes, Tegal, Pekalongan, Semarang Tawang, Gundih (only towards Malang), Solo Jebres, Sragen, Walikukun, Ngawi, Magetan, Madiun, Nganjuk, Kertosono, Kediri, Tulungagung, Ngunut, Blitar, Wlingi, Kesamben, Sumberpucung, Kepanjen, Malang Kotalama
Brawijaya	Priority	Gambir–Malang via Semarang Tawang	1x	Bekasi, Cikarang, Cirebon, Tegal, Pekalongan, Semarang Tawang, Solo Jebres, Madiun, Nganjuk, Kertosono, Kediri, Tulungagung, Blitar, Wlingi, Kepanjen, Malang Kotalama
Brawijaya	Executive	Gambir–Malang via Semarang Tawang	1x	Bekasi, Cikarang, Cirebon, Tegal, Pekalongan, Semarang Tawang, Solo Jebres, Madiun, Nganjuk, Kertosono, Kediri, Tulungagung, Blitar, Wlingi, Kepanjen, Malang Kotalama
Dharmawangsa Express	Executive	1x	Bekasi, Karawang (downstream direction only), Pegaden Baru, Haurgeulis (downstream direction only), Cirebon Prujakan, Tanjung, Brebes, Pekalongan, Weleri, Semarang Poncol (downstream direction only), Semarang Tawang, Ngrombo, Randublatung, Cepu, Bojonegoro, Babat, Lamongan	
Dharmawangsa Express	Economy	1x	Bekasi, Karawang (downstream direction only), Pegaden Baru, Haurgeulis (downstream direction only), Cirebon Prujakan, Tanjung, Brebes, Pekalongan, Weleri, Semarang Poncol (downstream direction only), Semarang Tawang, Ngrombo, Randublatung, Cepu, Bojonegoro, Babat, Lamongan	
Kertajaya	Premium Economy	1x	Bekasi, Cikarang, Haurgeulis, Jatibarang, Cirebon Prujakan, Brebes, Tegal, Weleri, Semarang Poncol, Ngrombo, Randublatung, Cepu, Bojonegoro, Babat, Lamongan	
Airlangga	Economy	1x	Bekasi, Cikarang, Cikampek, Pegaden Baru, Haurgeulis, Jatibarang, Arjawinangun, Cirebon Prujakan, Babakan, Tanjung, Brebes, Tegal, Pemalang, Pekalongan, Weleri, Semarang Poncol, Ngrombo, Randublatung, Cepu, Bojonegoro, Babat, Lamongan	
Argo Bromo Anggrek	Luxury	Gambir–Surabaya Pasarturi	2x	Cirebon, Pekalongan, Semarang Tawang, Bojonegoro
Argo Bromo Anggrek	Executive	Gambir–Surabaya Pasarturi	2x	Cirebon, Pekalongan, Semarang Tawang, Bojonegoro
Sembrani	Luxury	Gambir–Surabaya Pasarturi	2x	Bekasi, Cirebon, Tegal, Pekalongan, Semarang Tawang, Ngrombo (night schedule only), Cepu, Bojonegoro, Lamongan (night schedule only)
Sembrani	Executive	Gambir–Surabaya Pasarturi	2x	Bekasi, Cirebon, Tegal, Pekalongan, Semarang Tawang, Ngrombo (night schedule only), Cepu, Bojonegoro, Lamongan (night schedule only)
Harina	Executive	Bandung–Surabaya Pasarturi via Cirebon	1x	Cimahi, Purwakarta, Cikampek, Cirebon, Tegal, Pekalongan, Semarang Tawang, Ngrombo, Cepu, Bojonegoro, Babat, Lamongan
Harina	Premium Economy	Bandung–Surabaya Pasarturi via Cirebon	1x	Cimahi, Purwakarta, Cikampek, Cirebon, Tegal, Pekalongan, Semarang Tawang, Ngrombo, Cepu, Bojonegoro, Babat, Lamongan
Brantas	Executive	Pasar Senen–Blitar	1x	Bekasi, Haurgeulis (downstream direction only), Jatibarang, Cirebon Prujakan, Brebes, Tegal, Pekalongan, Semarang Tawang, Gundih, Solo Jebres, Sragen, Walikukun, Ngawi, Magetan, Madiun, Caruban, Nganjuk, Kertosono, Papar, Kediri, Tulungagung, Ngunut
Brantas	Economy	Pasar Senen–Blitar	1x	Bekasi, Haurgeulis (downstream direction only), Jatibarang, Cirebon Prujakan, Brebes, Tegal, Pekalongan, Semarang Tawang, Gundih, Solo Jebres, Sragen, Walikukun, Ngawi, Magetan, Madiun, Caruban, Nganjuk, Kertosono, Papar, Kediri, Tulungagung, Ngunut
Jayabaya	Executive	Senen Market–Malang via Surabaya Pasarturi	1x	Bekasi, Karawang, Cikampek, Haurgeulis (downstream only), Jatibarang, Cirebon, Tegal, Pemalang, Pekalongan, Weleri, Semarang Poncol, Ngrombo, Randublatung, Cepu, Bojonegoro, Babat, Lamongan, Surabaya Pasarturi, Surabaya Gubeng, Sidoarjo, Bangil, Lawang
Jayabaya	Economy	Senen Market–Malang via Surabaya Pasarturi	1x	Bekasi, Karawang, Cikampek, Haurgeulis (downstream only), Jatibarang, Cirebon, Tegal, Pemalang, Pekalongan, Weleri, Semarang Poncol, Ngrombo, Randublatung, Cepu, Bojonegoro, Babat, Lamongan, Surabaya Pasarturi, Surabaya Gubeng, Sidoarjo, Bangil, Lawang
Majapahit	Economy	Senen Market–Malang via Semarang Tawang	1x	Bekasi, Karawang (downstream direction only), Haurgeulis (Malang direction only), Cirebon Prujakan, Tegal, Pekalongan, Semarang Tawang, Solo Jebres, Sragen, Walikukun, Ngawi, Madiun, Nganjuk, Kertosono, Kediri, Tulungagung, Blitar, Wlingi, Kepanjen, Malang Old Town
Matarmaja	Economy	Senen Market–Malang via Semarang Tawang	1x	Bekasi, Pegaden Baru, Filled, Jatibarang, Cirebon Prujakan, Babakan, Brebes, Tegal, Pekalongan, Semarang Tawang, Gundih (only towards Malang), Solo Jebres, Sragen, Walikukun, Ngawi, Magetan, Madiun, Nganjuk, Kertosono, Kediri, Tulungagung, Ngunut, Blitar, Wlingi, Kesamben, Sumberpucung, Kepanjen, Malang Kotalama
Brawijaya	Priority	Gambir–Malang via Semarang Tawang	1x	Bekasi, Cikarang, Cirebon, Tegal, Pekalongan, Semarang Tawang, Solo Jebres, Madiun, Nganjuk, Kertosono, Kediri, Tulungagung, Blitar, Wlingi, Kepanjen, Malang Kotalama
Brawijaya	Executive	Gambir–Malang via Semarang Tawang	1x	Bekasi, Cikarang, Cirebon, Tegal, Pekalongan, Semarang Tawang, Solo Jebres, Madiun, Nganjuk, Kertosono, Kediri, Tulungagung, Blitar, Wlingi, Kepanjen, Malang Kotalama
Pandalungan	Executive	Gambir–Jember	1x	Cikarang, Filled (downstream direction only), Jatibarang (downstream direction only), Cirebon, Tegal, Pekalongan, Semarang Tawang, Ngrombo, Cepu, Bojonegoro, Lamongan, Surabaya Pasarturi, Surabaya Gubeng, Wonokromo (downstream direction only), Sidoarjo, Bangil, Pasuruan, Probolinggo, Klakah, Tanggul
Blambangan Express	Executive	Senen Market–Banyuwangi	1x	Bekasi, Karawang, Cirebon, Tegal, Pekalongan, Semarang Tawang, Ngrombo, Cepu, Bojonegoro, Lamongan, Surabaya Pasarturi, Surabaya Gubeng, Sidoarjo, Bangil, Pasuruan, Prooblinggo, Klakah, Tanggul, Rambipuji, Jember, Kalibaru, Kalisetail, Temuguruh, Rogojampi, Banyuwangi City
Blambangan Express	Economy	Senen Market–Banyuwangi	1x	Bekasi, Karawang, Cirebon, Tegal, Pekalongan, Semarang Tawang, Ngrombo, Cepu, Bojonegoro, Lamongan, Surabaya Pasarturi, Surabaya Gubeng, Sidoarjo, Bangil, Pasuruan, Prooblinggo, Klakah, Tanggul, Rambipuji, Jember, Kalibaru, Kalisetail, Temuguruh, Rogojampi, Banyuwangi City
Central Java to East Java
Name	Class	Relation	Frequency	Stopping stations
Ambarawa Express	Premium Economy	Semarang Poncol–Surabaya Pasarturi	2x	Semarang Tawang, Ngrombo, Kradenan, Randublatung, Cepu, Bojonegoro, Babat, Lamongan
Ambarawa Express	Economy	Semarang Poncol–Surabaya Pasarturi	2x	Semarang Tawang, Ngrombo, Kradenan, Randublatung, Cepu, Bojonegoro, Babat, Lamongan
Surabaya–Banyuwangi
Name	Class	Relation	Frequency	Stopping stations
Probowangi	Economy	Surabaya Gubeng–Banyuwangi	1x	Surabaya Gubeng, Sidoarjo, Bangil, Pasuruan, Probolinggo, Klakah, Tanggul, Rambipuji, Jember, Kalisetail, Kalibaru, Temuguruh, Rogojampi, Banyuwangi City
Mutiara Timur	Executive	Surabaya Pasarturi–Ketapang	1x	Surabaya Gubeng, Sidoarjo, Bangil, Pasuruan, Probolinggo, Tanggul, Rambipuji, Jember, Kalisetail, Kalibaru, Temuguruh, Rogojampi, Banyuwangi City
Mutiara Timur	Business	Surabaya Pasarturi–Ketapang	1x	Surabaya Gubeng, Sidoarjo, Bangil, Pasuruan, Probolinggo, Tanggul, Rambipuji, Jember, Kalisetail, Kalibaru, Temuguruh, Rogojampi, Banyuwangi City

Send feedback

===== Agglomeration =====
Name	Class	Relation	Frequency	Stopping station
Joglosemarkerto	Executive	Solo Balapan–Semarang Tawang via Purwokerto	1x	Clockwise: Klaten, Lempuyangan, Yogyakarta, Wates, Wojo (downstream only), Kutoarjo, Kutowinangun, Kebumen, Gombong, Sumpiuh, Kroya....: The Purwokerto–Semarang–Surakarta route only operates on the evening schedule; The journey to Semarang Tawang continues via Purwokerto (see below)
Joglosemarkerto	Economy	Solo Balapan–Semarang Tawang via Purwokerto	1x	Clockwise: Klaten, Lempuyangan, Yogyakarta, Wates, Wojo (downstream only), Kutoarjo, Kutowinangun, Kebumen, Gombong, Sumpiuh, Kroya....: The Purwokerto–Semarang–Surakarta route only operates on the evening schedule; The journey to Semarang Tawang continues via Purwokerto (see below)
Joglosemarkerto	Executive	Solo Balapan–Semarang Tawang via Purwokerto	1x	Counterclockwise: Salem, Gundih, Brumbung, Semarang Tawang, Semarang Poncol, Weleri, Pekalongan, Pemalang, Tegal, Slawi, Prupuk, Bumiayu, Purwokerto....: The journey to Solo Balapan continues via Purwokerto (see above)
Joglosemarkerto	Economy	Solo Balapan–Semarang Tawang via Purwokerto	1x	Counterclockwise: Salem, Gundih, Brumbung, Semarang Tawang, Semarang Poncol, Weleri, Pekalongan, Pemalang, Tegal, Slawi, Prupuk, Bumiayu, Purwokerto....: The journey to Solo Balapan continues via Purwokerto (see above)
Pangrango	Executive	Bogor–Sukabumi	3x	Bogor Paledang, Batutulis, Maseng, Cigombong, Cicurug, Parungkuda, Cibadak, Cisaat
Pangrango	Economy	Bogor–Sukabumi	3x	Bogor Paledang, Batutulis, Maseng, Cigombong, Cicurug, Parungkuda, Cibadak, Cisaat
Joglosemarkerto	Executive	Yogyakarta–Cilacap	1x	Wates, Kutoarjo, Kebumen, Karanganyar, Gombong, Sumpiuh, Kroya, Maos, Gumilir
Joglosemarkerto	Premium Economy	Yogyakarta–Cilacap	1x	Wates, Kutoarjo, Kebumen, Karanganyar, Gombong, Sumpiuh, Kroya, Maos, Gumilir
Kamandaka	Executive-Economic	Semarang Tawang–Purwokerto	1x	Semarang Poncol, Weleri, Pekalongan, Pemalang, Tegal, Slawi, Prupuk, Bumiayu: Kamandaka train can be extended to Cilacap Station with executive-premium economy class, stopping at Kroya Station, Maos, and Gumilir
Arjuno Express	Executive	Surabaya Gubeng – Malang	1x	Waru (downstream direction only), Sidoarjo, Bangil, Lawang; Operates on morning schedule every Friday–Sunday and national holidays
Banyubiru	Executive-Economy	Semarang Tawang–Solo Balapan	2x	Brumbung, Gundih, Salem
Kaligung	Executive-Economy	Semarang Poncol–Brebes	3x	Weleri, Batang, Pekalongan, Pemalang, Tegal: Kaligung train service extended to Cirebon Prujakan Station on the morning schedule and stops at Tanjung, Losari, and Babakan Stations; Semarang Poncol–Tegal segment only operates on the afternoon, evening, and night schedules

==== North Sumatra ====
===== Mixed class =====
Name	Class	Relation	Frequency	Stopping stations
Sribilah train	Executive-Business-Economy Premium	Medan – Rantauprapat	4x	Bandar Khalipah, Araskabu, Lubuk Pakam, Tebing Tinggi, Perlanaan, Lima Puluh, Kisaran, Puluraja (except night schedule), Mambang Muda, Padang Halaban, Marbau; Business and premium economy classes only operate on certain days

===== Economy class =====
Name	Class	Relation	Frequency	Stopping station	Travel distance
Putri Deli train	Economy	Medan – Tanjungbalai	3x	Bandar Khalipah, Batang Kuis, Araskabu, Lubukpakam, Perbaungan, Rampah, Tebing Tinggi, Bandar Tinggi, Perlanaan, Lima Puluh, Sei Bejangkar, Kisaran	174 km

=== West and South Sumatra ===
The following are intercity train services in West and South Sumatra according to Gapeka 2023.

Name	Class	Relation	Frequency	Stopping station
Sriwijaya Railway	Executive-Business	Kertapati – Tanjungkarang	1x	Prabumulih, Peninjawan, Baturaja, Martapura, Waytuba, Blambangan Umpu, Tulungbuyut, Ketapang, Kotabumi, Sulusuban, Bekri, Rejosari: Only operates on certain days
Rajabasa train	Economy	Kertapati – Tanjungkarang	1x	Payakabung, Prabumulih, Pagergunung, Peninjawan, Baturaja, Martapura, Waytuba, Blambangan Umpu, Negeri Agung, Tulungbuyut, Negeri Ratu, Ketapang, Kotabumi, Sulusuban, Haji Pemanggilan, Bekri, Tegineneng, Rejosari, Labuanratu
Sindang Marga train	Business-Executive	Kertapati – Lubuklinggau	1x	Prabumulih, Muara Enim, Lahat, Empat Lawang
Bukit Serelo train	Economy	Kertapati – Lubuklinggau	1x	Payakabung, Prabumulih, Belimbing Pendopo, Penanggiran, Muara Enim, Lahat, Bungamas, Tebing Tinggi, Muara Saling, Padang City
Kuala Stabas train	Economy	Tanjungkarang – Baturaja	2x	Labuanratu, Rejosari, Bekri, Hajj Summoning, Sulusuban, Kotabumi, Ketapang, Blambangan Umpu, Giham, Waytuba, Martapura

== Non-operational ==
=== Formerly operational ===
- Argo Bromo
- Argo Gede
- Argo Jati
- Argopuro
- Badrasurya
- Blagador
- Baraya Geulis
- Bumi Geulis
- Cantik Ekspres
- Cepat Sidareja
- Cianjuran
- Cipuja
- Cirebon Ekspres
- Cisadane
- Citrajaya
- Dolok Martimbang
- Empu Jaya
- Fajar Utama Semarang
- Fajar Utama Solo
- Feeder Purworejo
- Feeder Semarang-Bojonegoro
- Feeder Wonogiri
- Galuh
- Gaya Baru Malam Utara
- Gunung Jati Ekspres
- Jatayu
- Jayabaya Selatan
- Jayabaya Utara
- Joglokerto
- Kaligangsa
- Kaligung Mas
- Kalijaga
- Kalimaya
- Kamandanu
- Krakatau
- Kuda Putih
- Limex Gaja Baru
- Lokal Rangkas
- Madiun Ekspres
- Maharani
- Mahesa
- Malang Ekspres
- Mataram
- Merak Jaya
- Mutiara Utara
- Pajajaran
- Pandanaran
- Pandanwangi
- Papandayan Ekspres
- Parahyangan
- Patas Bandung Raya
- Patas Merak
- Pekalongan Ekspres
- Penataran Utama
- Priangan Ekspres
- Purbaya
- Putri Hijau
- Rangkas Jaya
- Rengganis
- Senja Singosari
- Senja Utama Semarang
- Senja Utama Solo
- Solo Jaya
- Sriwedari
- Suryajaya
- Taruna Ekspres
- Tawang Mas
- Tawangmangu
- Tegal Arum
- Tegal Bahari
- Tirtonadi

=== Noted in Gapeka 1961 ===
Name	Relation	Notes
1. Tarumanegara	Surabaya Pasar Turi - Gambir	It was an afternoon express train
2. Mantjanegara	Gambir - Surabaya Pasar Turi	It was an afternoon express train
3. Parahijangan	Surabaja Kota - Bandung	It was an afternoon express train
4. Madjapahit	Bandung - Surabaja Kota	It was an afternoon express train
5. Sunda Kelapa	Kroja - Gambir	It was an afternoon express train
6. Singhasari	Tjirebon - Surabaja Kota	It was an afternoon express train
7. Bintang Sendja	Surabaja Kota - Djakarta via Semarang	It was an night express train
8. Bintang Fadjar	Djakarta - Surabaja Kota via Semarang	It was an night express train

=== Dutch East Indies Era ===
Name	Relation
1. De Vlugge Vier	Batavia-Bandoeng
2. Eendaagsche Express	Batavia-Soerabaia
3. De Nacht Express	Batavia-Soerabaia

== See also ==
- List of named trains in id:Daftar kereta api di Indonesia (Indonesian Wikipedia)
- Jakarta Monorail
- Transport in Indonesia
- Monorails in Central Java
- List of railway stations in Indonesia
- List of railway companies in the Dutch East Indies
- Rail transport in Indonesia
- List of railway accidents and incidents in Indonesia
- List of defunct railway in Indonesia
- List of Kereta Api Indonesia rolling stock classes
- List of locomotives in Indonesia
- Trams in Surabaya
- Indonesian railway rolling stock numbering system and classification
