= Ngawi railway station =

Railway station in Indonesia

Ngawi Station Stasiun Ngawi
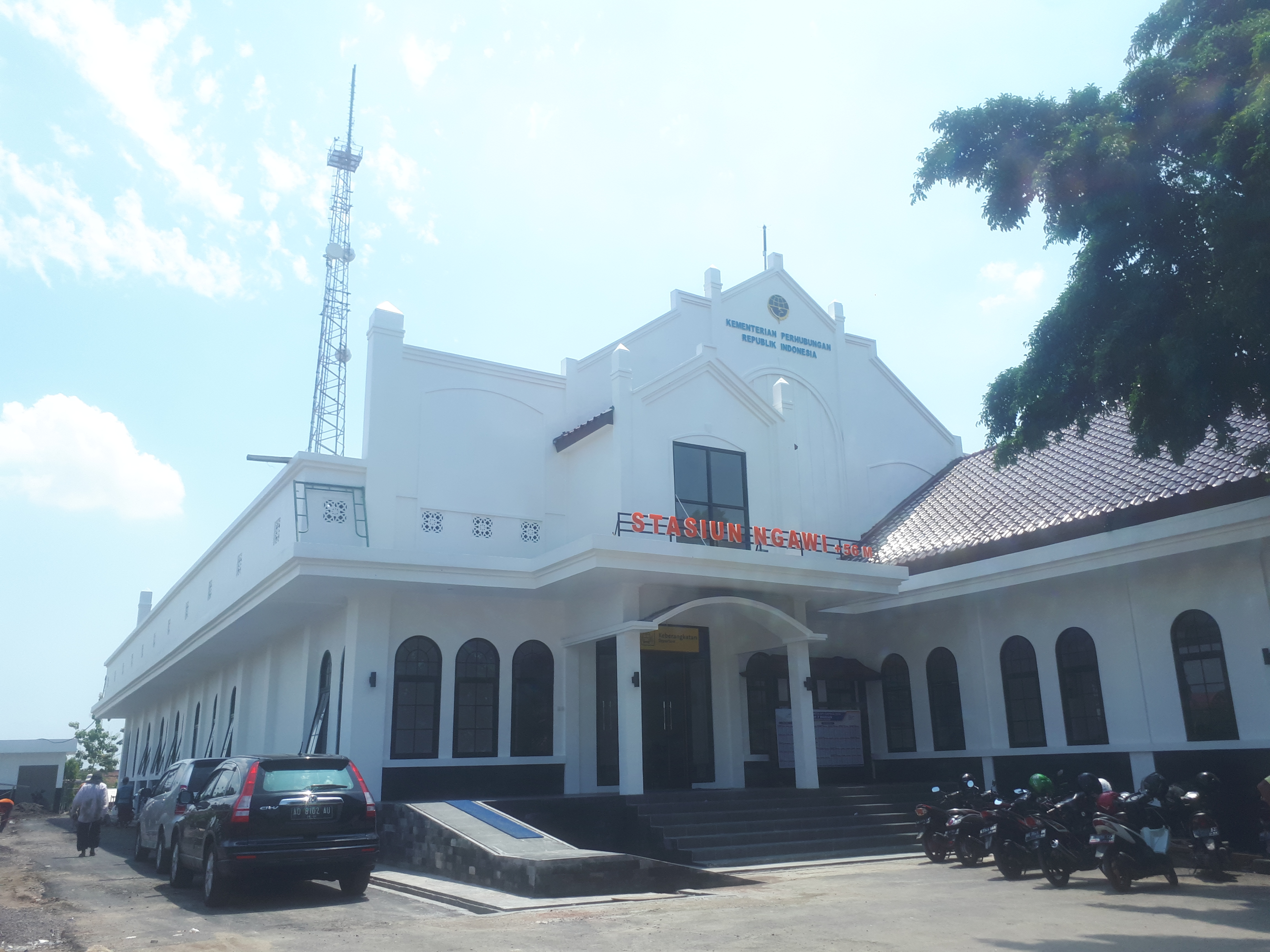
- The front view of Ngawi railway station's new building, 2019

General information
- Location: Gelung, Paron; Ngawi; Indonesia
- Coordinates: 7°26′31″S 111°23′9″E
- Elevation: +56 m (184 ft)
- System: Inter-city rail station
- Operator: Kereta Api Indonesia
- Line: Solo Balapan–Kertosono
- Platforms: 1 side platform 3 island platforms
- Tracks: 4

Construction
- Structure type: Ground
- Parking: Available
- Accessible: Available

Other information
- Station code: NGW
- Classification: First-class station

History
- Rebuilt: 30 November 2019
- Former names: Paron Station
Location
- Location within Java

Ngawi Station (Indonesian: Stasiun Ngawi, station code: NGW, formerly Paron Station (PA)) is a first-class railway station in Gelung, Paron, Ngawi Regency, Indonesia, operated by Kereta Api Indonesia. This railway station located 8–10 km southwest from Ngawi (city). The new building is operated—which has four tracks (two main lines and two passing tracks)—since Geneng–Kedungbanteng double track segment activation on 30 November 2019. Moreover, this former railway station name, Paron, has been changed.

== Services ==
=== Passenger services ===
==== Executive class ====
- Bangunkarta, destination of Gambir via Solo Jebres–Semarang Tawang and Surabaya Gubeng
- Gajayana Fakultatif, destination of Gambir via Yogyakarta and Malang

==== Mixed class ====
- Malabar, destination of Bandung and Malang (executive-business-economy)
- Singasari, destination of Pasar Senen via Lempuyangan and Blitar (executive-economy)
- Brantas, destination of Pasar Senen via Semarang Tawang and Blitar (executive-economy)
- Anjasmoro, destination of Pasar Senen via Lempuyangan and Jombang (executive-economy)
- Wijayakusuma, destination of Cilacap and Ketapang (executive-economy)
- Logawa, destination of Purwokerto and Jember via Surabaya Gubeng (business-economy)

==== Economy class ====
- Majapahit, destination of Pasar Senen via Semarang Tawang and Malang
- Jayakarta, destination of Pasar Senen via Lempuyangan and Surabaya Gubeng
- Matarmaja, destination of Pasar Senen via Semarang Tawang and Malang
- Kahuripan, destination of Kiaracondong and Blitar
- Pasundan, destination of Kiaracondong and Surabaya Gubeng
- Sri Tanjung, destination of Lempuyangan and Ketapang via Surabaya Kota

Preceding station	Kereta Api Indonesia	Following station
Kedunggalar towards Solo Balapan	Solo Balapan–Kertosono	Geneng towards Kertosono
