= Papar railway station (Indonesia) =

Railway station in Indonesia

Papar Station Stasiun Papar
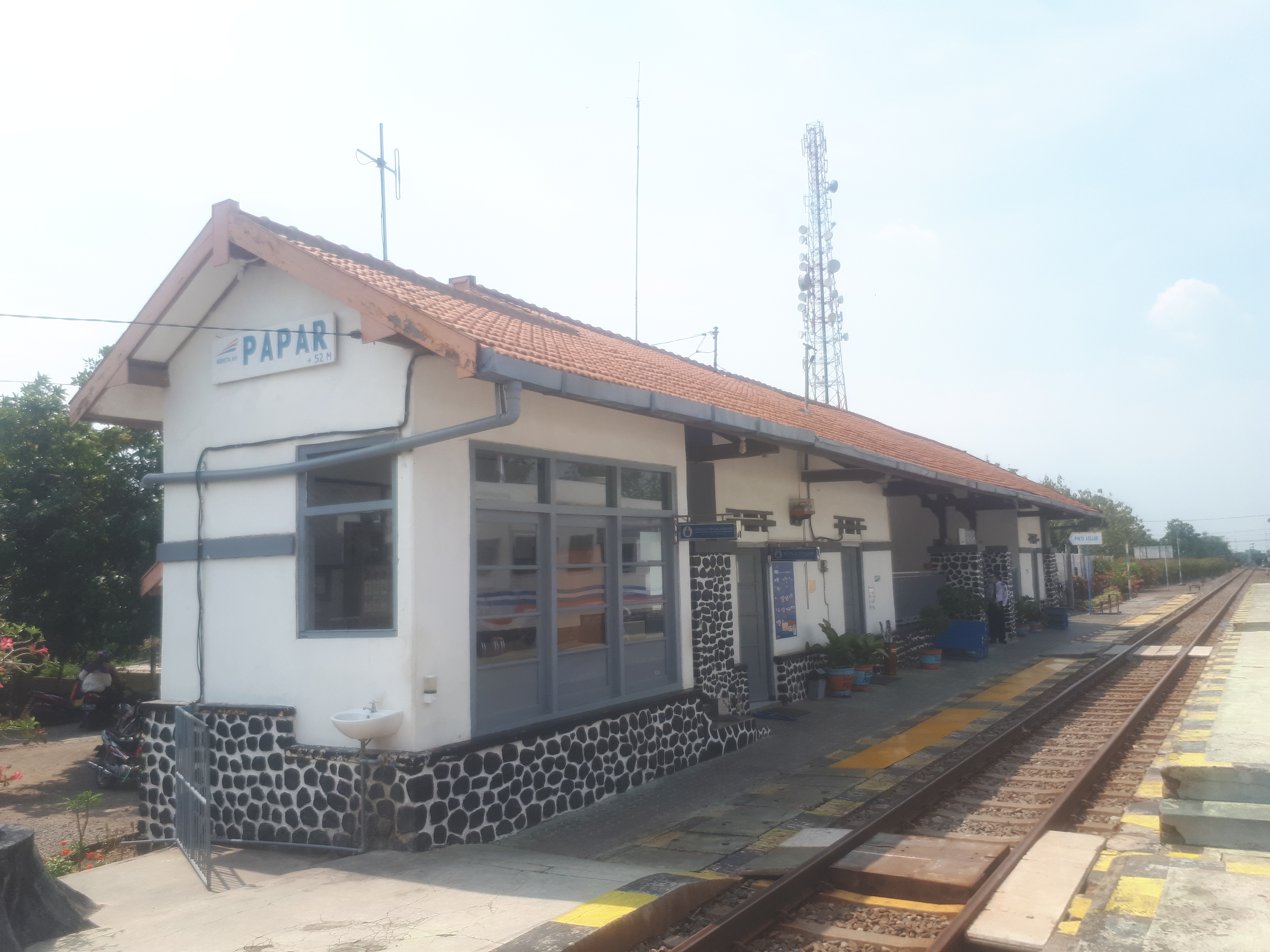
- Papar Station, as of 8 September 2020

General information
- Location: Papar, Papar, Kediri Regency; East Java; Indonesia
- Coordinates: 7.6975953°S 112.0794404°E
- Elevation: +52 m (171 ft)
- System: Regional rail
- Operator: Kereta Api Indonesia
- Line: Kertosono–Bangil
- Platforms: 1 side platform 1 island platform
- Tracks: 2

Construction
- Structure type: Ground
- Parking: Available
- Accessible: Available

Other information
- Station code: PPR
- Classification: Class III

Services
Preceding station		Following station
Purwoasri One-way operation	Commuter Line Dhoho SB-SB East Java Circular Line (counter-clockwise)	Kediri towards
Purwoasri One-way operation	Commuter Line Dhoho SB-ML East Java Circular Line (counter-clockwise)	Kediri towards
Purwoasri One-way operation	Commuter Line Dhoho SB-BL East Java Circular Line (counter-clockwise)	Kediri towards
Kediri One-way operation	Commuter Line Penataran SB-SB East Java Circular Line (clockwise)	Purwoasri towards
Kediri One-way operation	Commuter Line Penataran ML-SB East Java Circular Line (clockwise)	Purwoasri towards
Kediri One-way operation	Commuter Line Penataran BL-SB East Java Circular Line (clockwise)	Purwoasri towards
Location
- Location within Java

Papar Station (station code: PPR) is a third-class railway station in Papar, Papar, Kediri Regency, East Java, Indonesia, operated by Kereta Api Indonesia. This railway station is located 200 m east of Kertosono–Kediri Road.

== Services ==
=== Local/regional train ===
- Dhoho, destination of Surabaya Kota via Kertosono and Blitar

Preceding station	Kereta Api Indonesia	Following station
Purwoasri towards Kertosono	Kertosono–Bangil	Minggiran towards Bangil
