= Airlangga (train) =

Passenger train with the economy class between Pasar Senen & Surabaya Pasarturi

Airlangga train
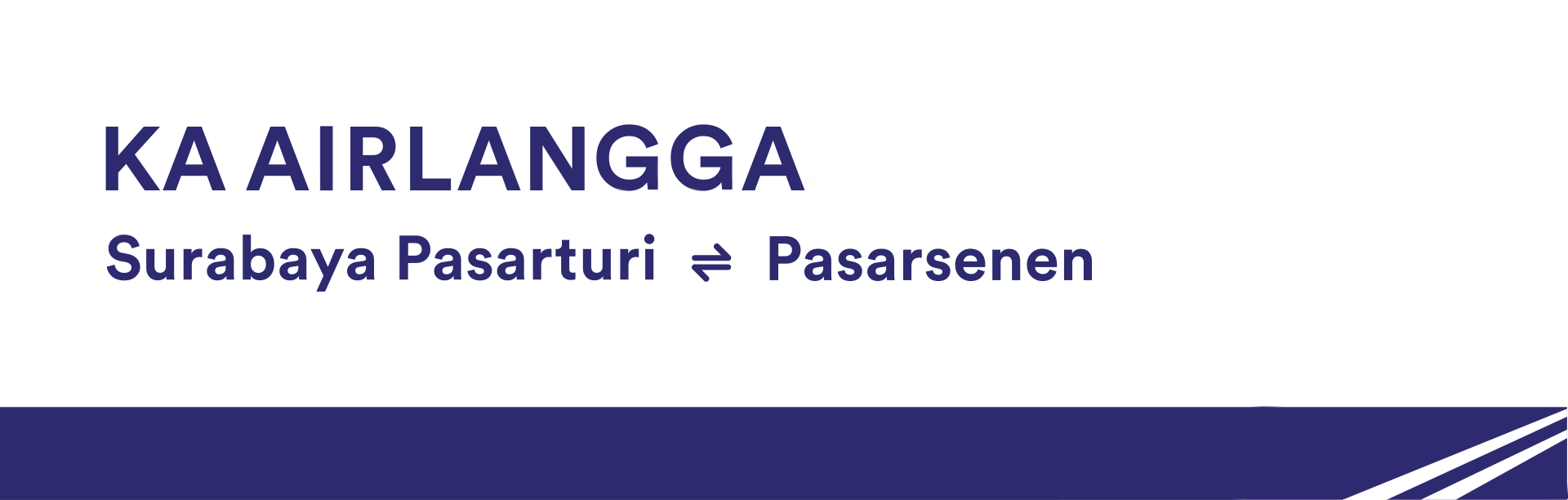

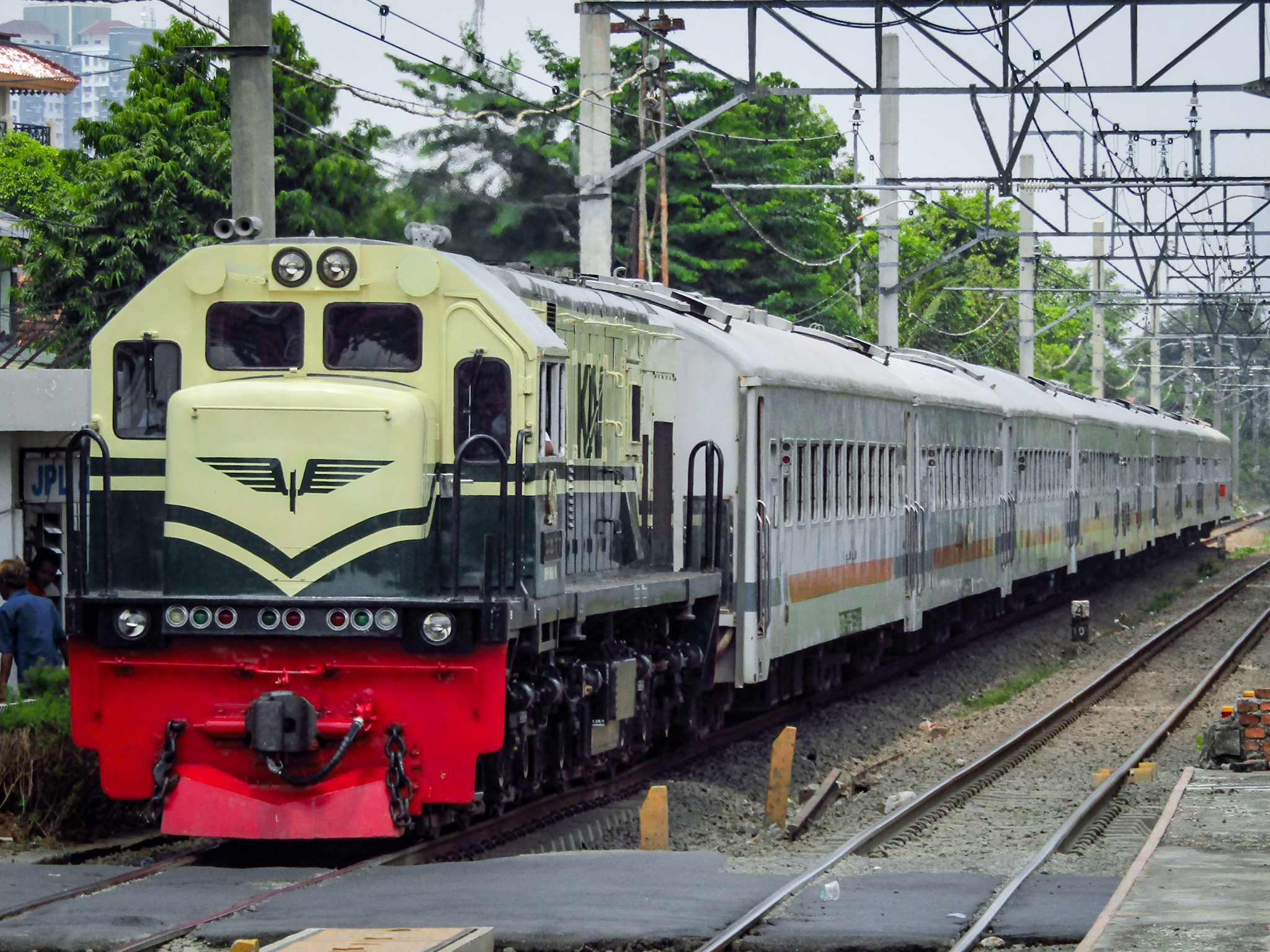
- Airlangga train use with the vintage of CC 201 locomotive, 2023

Overview
- Service type: Inter-city rail
- Status: Operational
- Predecessor: Maharani (2014 - 2021); Tegal Express (2012 - 2021)
- First service: 1 October 2021
- Current operator: Kereta Api Indonesia

Route
- Termini: Jakarta Pasar Senen; Surabaya Pasarturi
- Distance travelled: 719 km (446 mil)
- Average journey time: 12 hours 23 minutes
- Service frequency: 1x Daily each way
- Train number: 271-272

On-board services
- Class: economy
- Seating arrangements: 106 seats are arranged 3–2 (economy class)
- Catering facilities: snack, food, & drink service

Technical
- Rolling stock: CC203; CC201
- Track gauge: 1067 mm
- Operating speed: 50 - 90 km/h (31 - 55 mph)
Route map

Airlangga train is an passenger train with the economy class that is operated by Kereta Api Indonesia which between Pasar Senen & Surabaya Pasarturi. The Airlangga train offer 1x travel at night schedule around 719 km (446 mil) in 12 hours 23 minutes.

As a train whose fares are subsidized by the Government or PSO, the fares for this train range from Rp. 49,000 – Rp. 104,000 was depending on the distance traveled by passengers.

== Branding ==
The name Airlangga is taken from the name of the king who ruled East Java in the 11th century, King Airlangga. He was the founder of the Kingdom of Kahuripan which later split into the Kingdom of Jenggala and Kingdom of Kadiri.

== History ==
The Airlangga train was launched on 1 October 2021 at Pasar Senen. The inauguration was carried out by the Director of Human Resources and General Affairs of KAI, Agung Yunanto, accompanied by the Director of Traffic and Railway Transportation Directorate General of Railways Ministry of Transportation of the Republic of Indonesia or Ministry of Transportation, Danto Restyawan.

The Airlangga train is the successor to two previous train services on the northern route of Java Island, namely the Maharani train on the Semarang Poncol–Surabaya Pasarturi Station route and the Tegal Express on the Tegal Station–Pasar Senen Station route. The Airlangga train carries eight economy class passenger cars with 106 seats facing each other. The Airlangga train also receive subsidies from the government as the part of public service obligations (PSO).

On 1 March 2022, the Airlangga train adding destination at Cikarang and Arjawinangun Station, this caused the train numbers to change to 7049A and 7050A. As of 1 June 2023, along with the implementation of Gapeka 2023, the Airlangga train was changed its train numbers to 235 and 236.

== Stations ==
- Pasarsenen (Start/End)
- Jatinegara (only bound from Surabaya)
- Bekasi
- Cikarang
- Cikampek
- Arjawinangun
- Jatibarang
- Haurgeulis
- Pegadenbaru
- Cirebon Prujakan
- Babakan
- Tanjung
- Brebes
- Tegal
- Pemalang
- Pekalongan
- Weleri
- Semarang Poncol
- Ngrombo
- Randublatung
- Cepu
- Bojonegoro
- Babat
- Lamongan
- Surabaya Pasarturi (Start/End)
