= Brantas (train) =

Indonesian passenger rail line

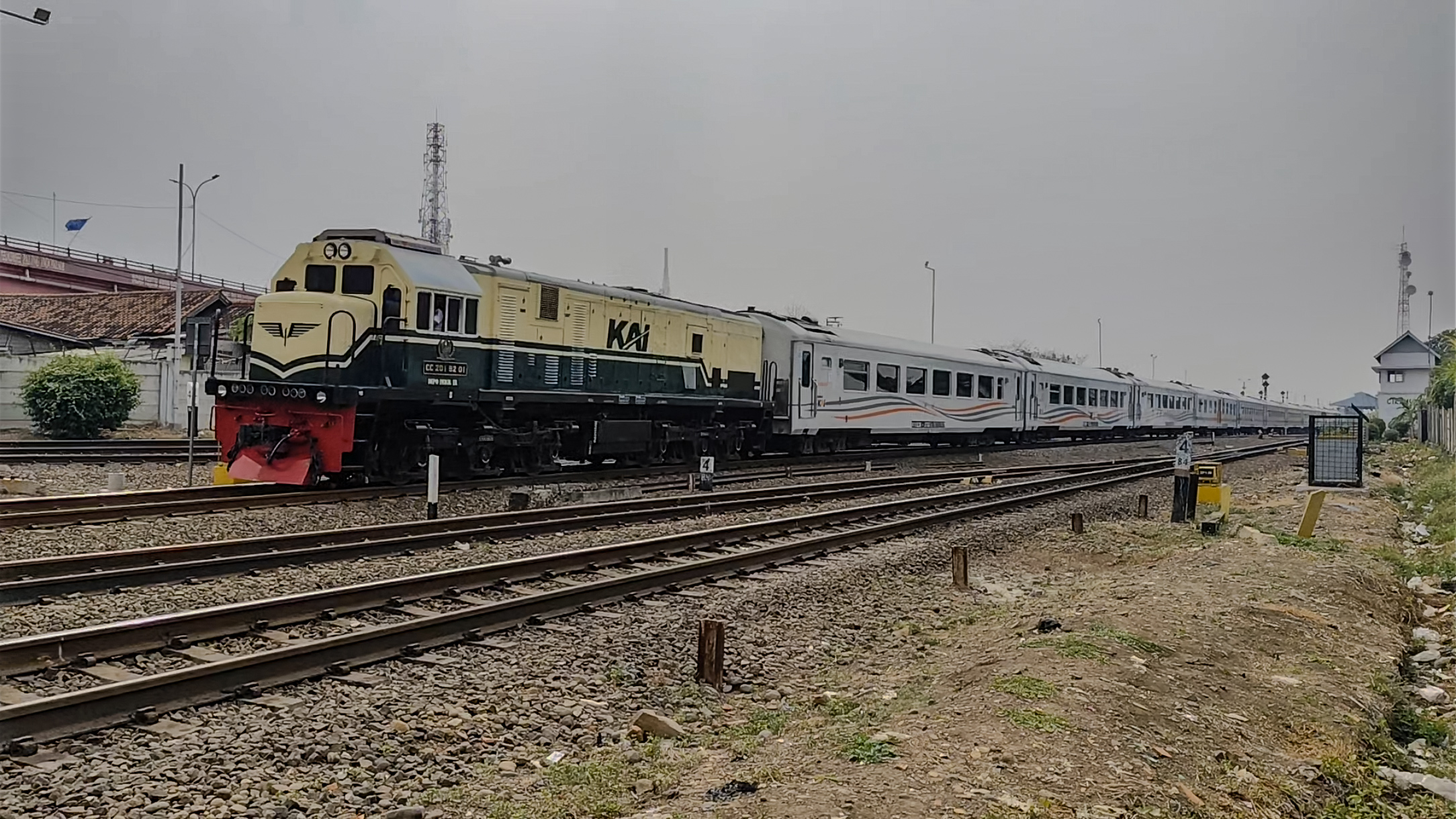
- Brantas train passing in Cikampek, October 2024

Overview
- Service type: Inter-city rail
- Status: Operational
- Locale: Operational Area VII Madiun
- First service: 1 October 1998; 27 years ago
- Current operator: Kereta Api Indonesia

Route
- Termini: Blitar; Pasar Senen
- Distance travelled: 828 kilometres (514 miles)
- Average journey time: 12 hours 55 minutes
- Service frequency: daily each way
- Train numbers: 151-152 (regular); 7015-7016 (addition)

On-board services
- Classes: executive and economy
- Seating arrangements: 50 seats arranged 2-2 (executive class); 72 seats arranged 2-2 (economy class)
- Catering facilities: On-board cafe and trolley service

Technical
- Rolling stock: CC203; CC201
- Track gauge: 1,067 mm
- Operating speed: 75–120 kilometres per hour (47–75 mph)
Route map

Brantas train is an Indonesian passenger train, operated by Kereta Api Indonesia running between Blitar and Pasar Senen via Semarang Tawang and Solo Jebres in Java.

== History ==
On 1 October 1998, PT KAI launching the Brantas train between Tanah Abang and Kediri via Manggarai. At that time, this train used economy class trains made by PT INKA in 1998.

On 1 November 2014, the last station of the train was changed to Pasar Senen. On 1 April 2017, the last station from Pasar Senen extended to Blitar. At the end of 2019, PT KAI added an executive class carriage to this train, and it began regularly exchanging trains with the Dharmawangsa Express on the Pasar Senen - Surabaya Pasar Turi line. On 1 February 2022, this train began making regular stops at Cikarang.

== Tariff ==
As of 2 January 2020, the Brantas train's tariff ranged from Rp. 85,000–Rp. 140,000 for economy class to Rp. 240,000–Rp. 450,000 for executive class.

== Station list ==
The route of the Brantas train in 2025:

- Pasar Senen (start/end)
- Jatinegara (only bound from Blitar)
- Bekasi
- Pegaden Baru
- Haurgeulis
- Jatibarang
- Cirebon Prujakan
- Brebes
- Tegal
- Pekalongan
- Semarang Tawang
- Gundih
- Solo Jebres
- Sragen
- Walikukun
- Ngawi
- Magetan
- Madiun
- Caruban
- Nganjuk
- Kertosono
- Papar
- Kediri
- Tulungagung
- Ngunut
- Blitar (start/end)

== Incident ==
On 13 December 2020, the Brantas train crashed into a patrol car belonging to the Kalijambe Police, which was carrying police and TNI Koramil personnel at an unmarked crossing in Dukuh Siboto, Kalimacan Village, Kalijambe District, Sragen, Central Java. This incident resulted in the deaths of three people (officers).

== See also ==
- Brantas River
- Singasari
