= Logawa =

Passenger train between Purwokerto & Ketapang, Indonesia

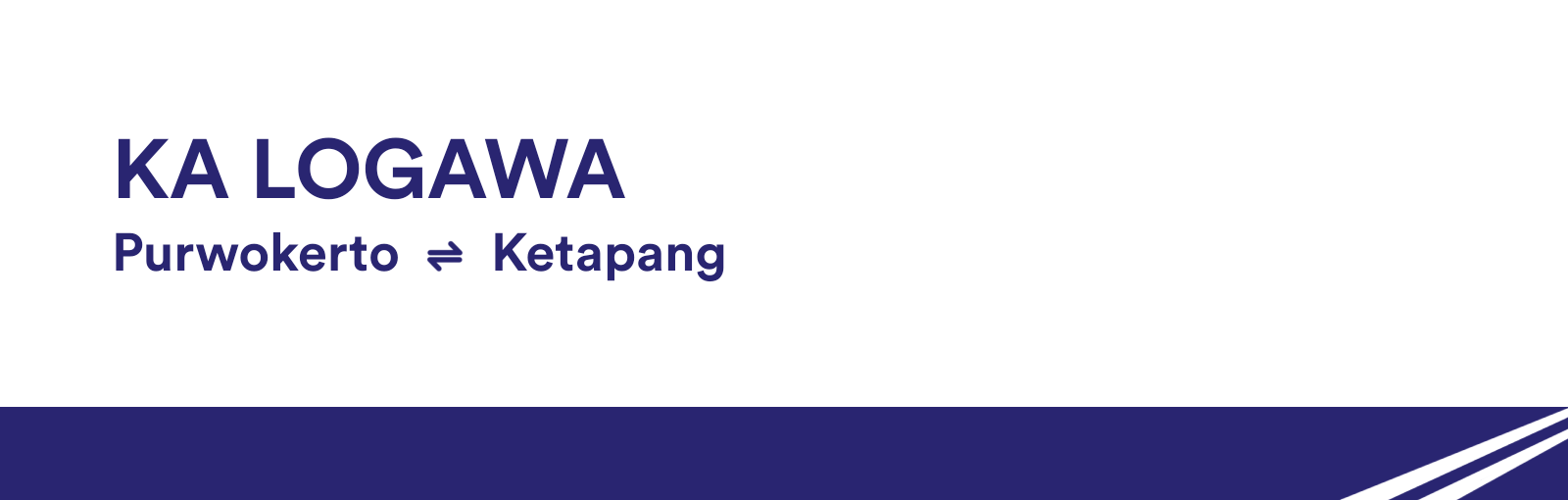

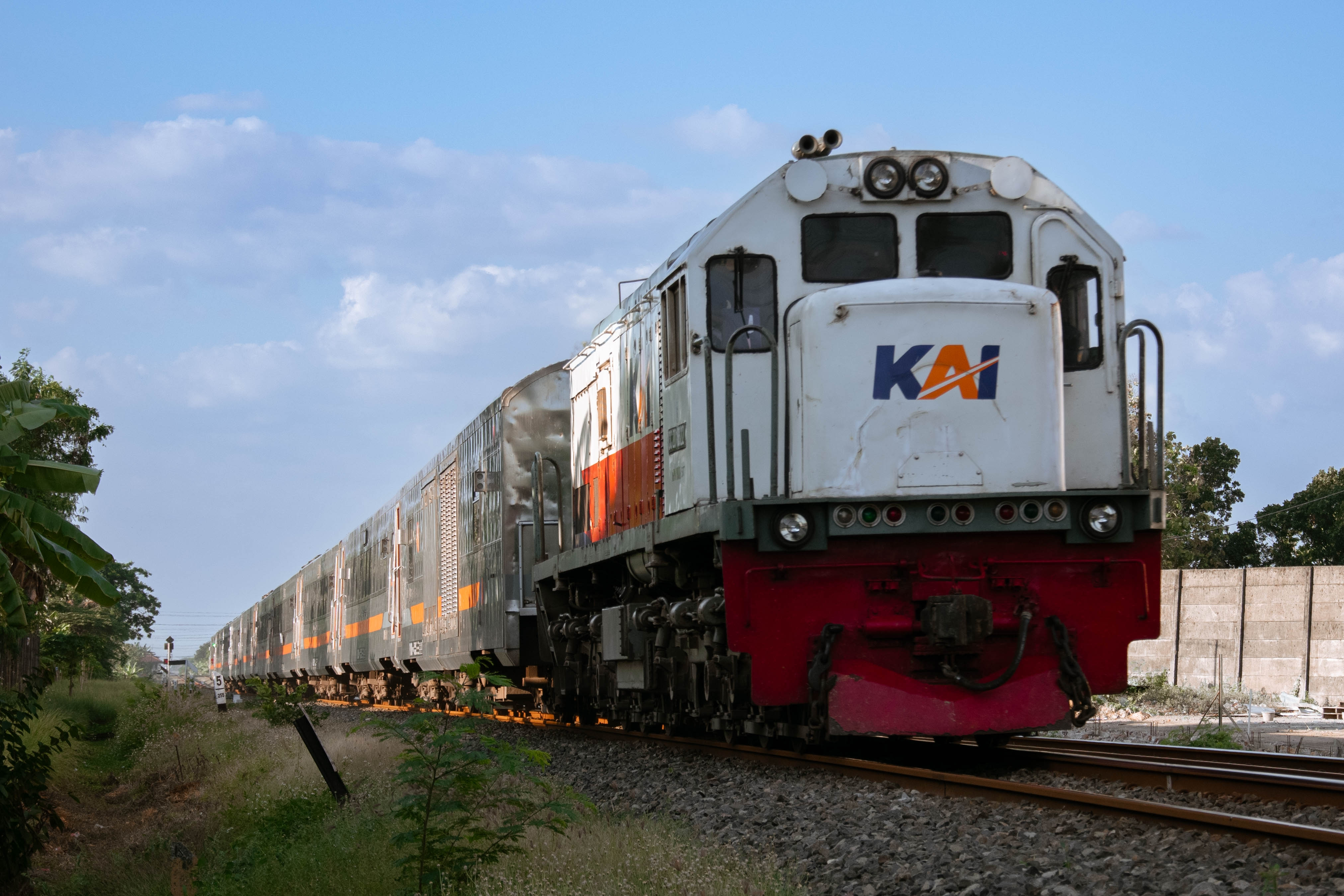
- Logawa train was downgraded to 1st Generation stainless steel, July 2025

Overview
- Service type: Inter-city rail
- Status: Operational
- First service: 21 April 1999; 27 years ago
- Current operator: Kereta Api Indonesia

Route
- Termini: Purwokerto; Ketapang
- Distance travelled: 781 kilometres (485 mi)
- Average journey time: 14 hours 20 minutes
- Service frequency: Daily each way
- Train number: 247-250

On-board services
- Class: Premium economy
- Seating arrangements: 80 seats arranged 2-2 (premium economy class)
- Catering facilities: On-board cafe and trolley service

Technical
- Rolling stock: CC206/CC203/CC201
- Track gauge: 1067 mm
- Operating speed: 50–120 kilometres per hour (31–75 mph)
Logawa train Map
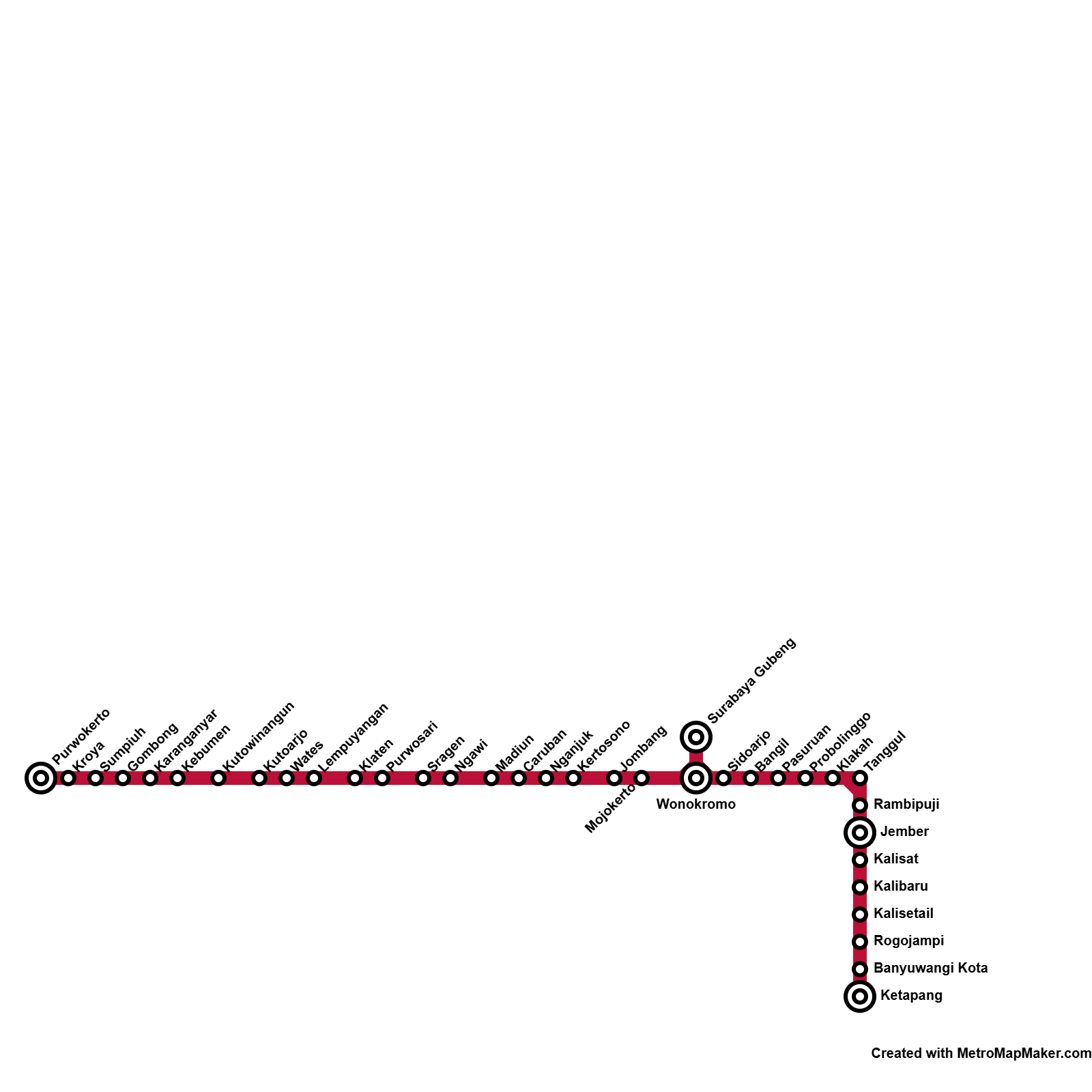

Logawa is an passenger train with the premium economy class that is operated by Kereta Api Indonesia which between Purwokerto & Ketapang via Surabaya Gubeng since 1 February 2025 as an effect of the Gapeka 2025, that before only to Jember which previews of the Gapeka 2023 on 1 June 2023.

The train offer only 1x daily each way to Ketapang, Banyuwangi from Purwokerto around 781 kilometres (485 mi) in 14 hours 20 minutes for travel.

== Branding ==
The name "Logawa" is taken from the name of one of the rivers in Banyumas Regency, Central Java, namely Kali Logawa, which is one of the Tributaries of Serayu.

== History ==
The Logawa train was first time operate by KAI on 21 April 1999 and its possible serving to Cilacap. In travel to Purwokerto, The Logawa train was divided into two upon arrival at Kroya: continuing to Cilacap and continuing to Purwokerto. This train once operated concurrently with the Purbaya train on the Purwokerto–Surabaya Gubeng Station round trip. However, due to the rationalization of passenger train services carried out by PT KA on 21 January 2002, the Purbaya train was discontinued, along with other trains such as the Cisadane, Gaya Baru Malam Utara, Tirtonadi, Tawang Mas, Cisadane, Galuh, and Rengganis. The Logawa train itself has no longer served passengers to Cilacap since 2011.

Since on 1 January 2019, the Logawa train is one of five economy class train services that experienced a change in fares from subsidized to commercial (non-PSO). Then, on 1 November 2019, the Logawa train business class service was added, making it the only passenger train in Indonesia with mixed business and economy class service to 18 September 2024.

As part of the service improvement, the old train set was replaced with the latest generation of economy train set with stainless steel body produced by PT INKA on 18 September 2024 at Purwokerto Station, while the opposite direction on 19 September 2024. The striking difference in the economy and business train set is the seating capacity, originally from 106 seats and 64 long seat type seats to 72 captain seat type seats that can be reclined or rotated in the direction of the train's speed. One of the features of the latest generation economy train set is the information screen available in each train that can display information about the nearest station, speed, and room temperature. The information screen helps create a better travel experience and provides important information for customers during the trip. For the needs of charging customer devices, there is also a USB charger port feature on each seat next to the power outlets available on the train walls, so that passengers can continue to use their devices no worrying about running out of power according to modern needs.

On 31 January 2025, there was a change in the facilities on the Logawa train on the new generation economy train set made by PT INKA, which was exchanged with used premium economy trains from the Bogowonto train set and Fajar and Senja Utama Solo train set. The reason was because the new generation economy train set made by INKA experienced problems when entering the Garahan railway tunnel due to the high dimensions of the new generation economy train so that it could graze the top of the railway tunnel this mean the new generation economy train can't extended to Banyuwangi.

On 1 February 2025 as an effect of the Gapeka 2025, the Logawa train officially extended to Ketapang and downgraded to the 1st Generation premium economy stainless steel by PT INKA, while the new generation replaced by the Fajar and Senja Utama Solo train which route between Pasar Senen & Solo Balapan.

The Logawa train set consisting of eight stainless steel premium economy cars, one dining car and one power car.

== Stations ==
On 1 February 2025, the Logawa train was extended to Ketapang were the passenger train no transit from Purwokerto, however the Logawa also downgraded to the 1st Generation stainless steel.

- Purwokerto (Start/End)
- Kroya
- Sumpiuh
- Gombong
- Karanganyar
- Kebumen
- Kutowinangun
- Kutoarjo
- Wates
- Lempuyangan
- Klaten
- Purwosari
- Sragen
- Ngawi
- Madiun
- Caruban
- Nganjuk
- Kertosono
- Jombang
- Mojokerto
- Wonokromo
- Surabaya Gubeng (for car curtains of locomotive to Purwokerto or Banyuwangi)
- Sidoarjo
- Bangil
- Pasuruan
- Probolinggo
- Tanggul
- Rambipuji
- Jember
- Kalisat
- Kalibaru
- Kalisetail
- Temuguruh
- Rogojampi
- Banyuwangi Kota
- Ketapang (Start/End)

== Incident ==
- On 29 June 2010, the Logawa train to Jember derailed on a major bend west of Wilangan, precisely in Pajaran Village, Saradan District, Madiun Regency—allegedly caused by speeding on a bend exceeding the permitted speed limit. This incident resulted in the killing of 6 passengers and injuries to 73 passengers.
- On 16 October 2016, the 249 Logawa train was hit by a pickup truck (pickup) at an official and guarded crossing (JPL163) in Watestani Village, Nguling District, Pasuruan Regency, East Java km 85+9. The pickup was dragged for 300 meters and caught fire, also burning the front of the train's long-hood locomotive. There were no fatalities in this incident because the driver and two passengers of the pickup managed to escape. As a result, there was a delay due to the replacement of the locomotive and the cleaning of the wreckage from the rail tires (baan).
