= Tawang Alun =

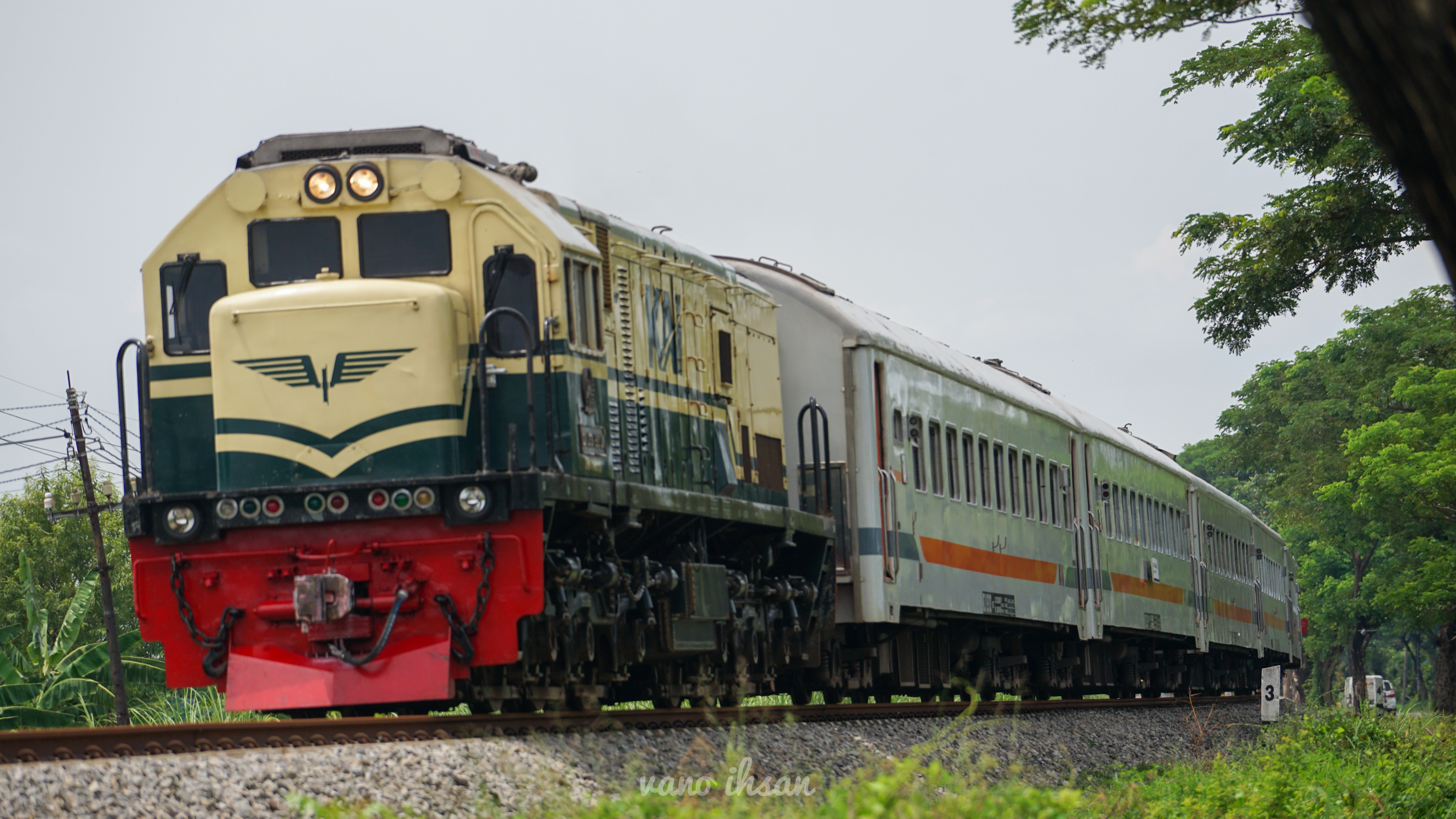
- Tawang Alun train in Pasuruan, East Java

Overview
- Service type: Inter-city rail
- Status: Operating
- Locale: East Java, Indonesia
- First service: 2002; 23 years ago
- Current operator: KAI Operational Area IX Jember

Route
- Termini: Ketapang; Malang Kotalama
- Distance travelled: 314 km (195 mi)
- Average journey time: 7 hours and 36 minutes
- Service frequency: Once in a day
- Train number: 261-264

On-board services
- Class: Economy class
- Seating arrangements: 3-2
- Catering facilities: On-board café
- Baggage facilities: Overhead racks.

Technical
- Track gauge: 1,067 mm (3 ft 6 in)
- Operating speed: 60–90 km/h

Tawang Alun is a train that serves the Ketapang–Malang Kotalama route and is one of two trains that cross the line. The other train is the Ijen Express.

The name of this train comes from Prabu Tawang Alun who was one of the kings of the Blambangan Kingdom which was the forerunner of Banyuwangi.

== History and operation ==
This train was present as a replacement for Rengganis which had operated in the 1990s with the Ketapang–Kediri route. It was simplified and finally the train stopped operating in 2002 and was replaced by the Tawang Alun Train in the same year.

The train consists of five economy class carriages and one powered dining carriage.

== Route ==
Note: All stations below are in East Java Province.

Station name	Distance from (km)		Regency/Cities
Station name	Previous station	Ketapang	Regency/Cities
Ketapang	—		Banyuwangi
Banyuwangi Kota	11.629		Banyuwangi
Rogojampi	11.215	22.844	Banyuwangi
Temuguruh	10.107	32.951	Banyuwangi
Kalisetail	7.324	40.275	Banyuwangi
Kalibaru	17.376	57.651	Banyuwangi
Kalisat	37.390	95.041	Jember
Jember	17.177	112.218	Jember
Rambipuji	10.697	122.915	Jember
Tanggul	19.538	142.453	Jember
Klakah	32.404	174.857	Lumajang
Probolinggo	33.933	208.790	Probolinggo
Pasuruan	38.475	247.265	Pasuruan
Bangil	15.938	263.203	Pasuruan Regency
Lawang	31.114	294.317	Malang Regency
Malang	18.120	312.437	Malang
Malang Kotalama	2.136	314.573	Malang

== Incident ==
- On 14 July 2006, Tawang Alun train derailed in Klatak, Jember. The rotten rail bearings caused all the carriages to come off the rails, resulting in three passengers being injured. The surviving passengers were taken to the nearest station to depart again on another train.
- On 20 August 2011, the Tawang Alun train derailed in Gerongan, Pasuruan after hitting a truck loaded with logs. The locomotive was damaged and the first train set derailed so it could not continue its journey. Luckily, the truck driver only suffered minor injuries to his forehead.
