= Jember railway station =

Railway station in Indonesia

Jember Station Stasiun Jember
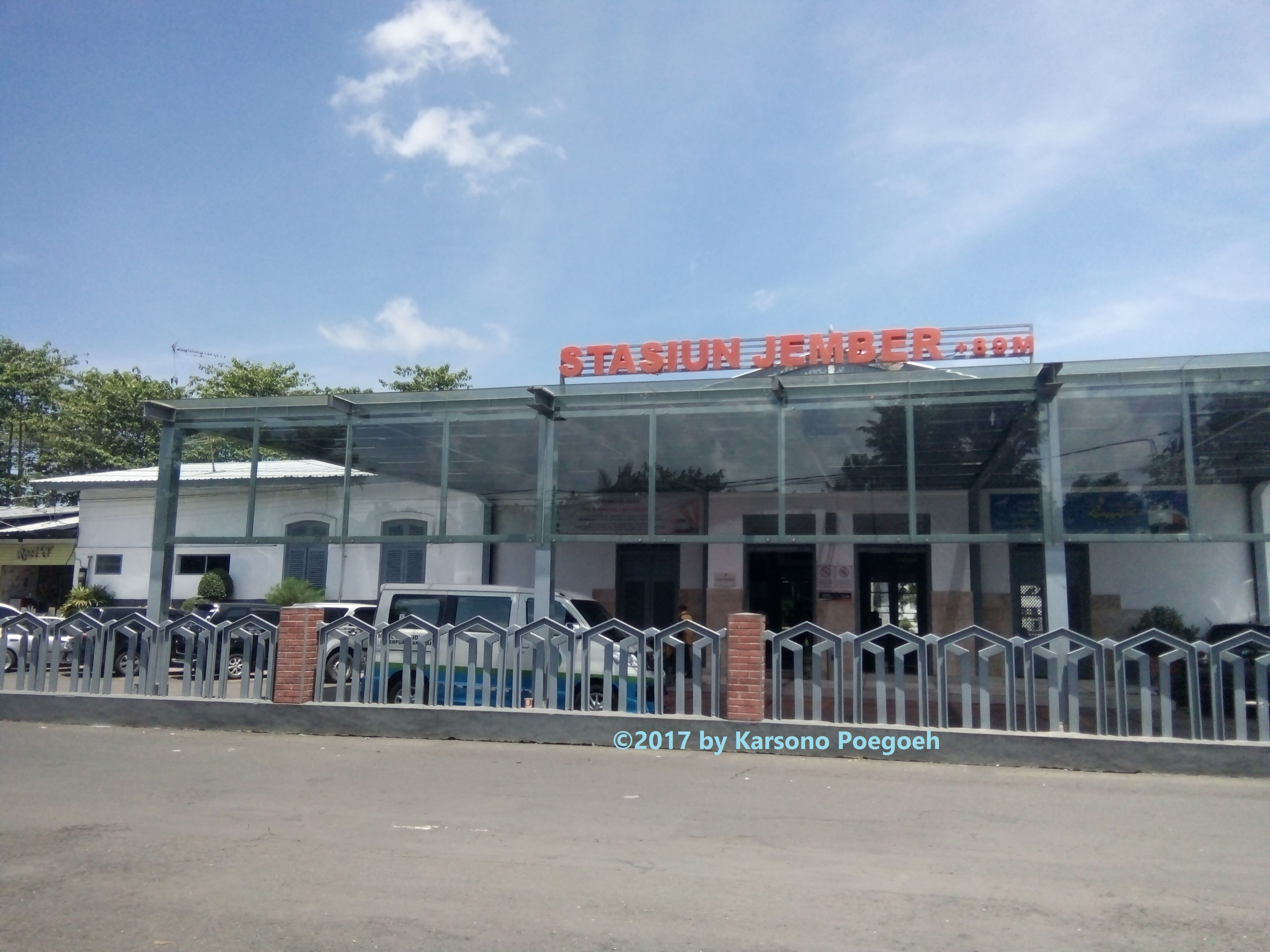
- Entrance of Jember Station

General information
- Location: Jember Regency, East Java; Indonesia
- Coordinates: 8.1648°S 113.7036°E
- Elevation: +89 m (292 ft)
- Owner: Kereta Api Indonesia
- Operator: Kereta Api Indonesia
- Line: Bangil–Kalisat
- Platforms: 1 side platform 2 island platforms
- Tracks: 8

Construction
- Parking: Available
- Accessible: Available

Other information
- Station code: JR

History
- Opened: 1 June 1897
- Rebuilt: 2007-2008 and 2015-2016
Location
- Location within Java

Jember Station (JR) is a large-scale railway station located in Jemberlor, Patrang, Jember Regency. The station located at an altitude of +89 meters is the largest station in the management of PT Kereta Api Indonesia (Persero) Operation Area IX Jember. The station is near from Jember town square.

The station that still uses mechanical signaling system has eight tracks plus one track connected to Jember Locomotive Depot located on the northwest part of the station. Tracks 2 (main) and 3 are used for the arrival and departure of most trains; track 1 is also used as departure and arrival only if track 2 and/or 3 are already occupied by another train; track 3-6 for trainset and locomotives parking, and for the track to and from the locomotive; tracks 7 and 8 only used in emergency. tracks 1, 3, and 4 connect directly to the main track (track 2). Track 5-8 are stub-end track. All Trains whose passing Bangil-Kalisat-Ketapang lane must stop at this station.

== Services ==
Passenger trains that use this station are :

=== Intercity trains ===
==== Executive class ====
- Pandalungan, to Gambir via Surabaya Gubeng-Surabaya Pasar Turi-Semarang Tawang

==== Mixed class (executive and economy) ====
- Mutiara Timur, from Ketapang to Surabaya Gubeng and Ketapang
- Ranggajati, to Cirebon via Surabaya Gubeng-Madiun-Solo Balapan-Yogyakarta-Purwokerto
- Blambangan Express, from Ketapang to Pasar Senen via Surabaya Gubeng-Surabaya Pasar Turi-Semarang Tawang
- Sangkuriang, from Ketapang to Bandung via Surabaya Gubeng-Yogyakarta-Tasikmalaya

==== Economy class ====
- Logawa, to Purwokerto via Surabaya Gubeng-Madiun-Purwosari-Lempuyangan
- Sri Tanjung, to Lempuyangan via Surabaya Gubeng-Madiun-Purwosari and from Ketapang
- Tawang Alun, to Malang via Bangil and Ketapang
- Probowangi, to Surabaya Gubeng and Ketapang

=== Local train ===
- Pandanwangi, to and from Ketapang

Preceding station	Kereta Api Indonesia	Following station
Mangli towards Bangil	Bangil–Kalisat	Arjasa towards Kalisat
