= Mataram (train) =

Train service in Indonesia

Mataram train

- Mataram train 75 passing through Lempuyangan Station to Jakarta, 2026

Overview
- Service type: Inter-city rail
- Status: Operational
- First service: 15 June 2017
- Current operator: Kereta Api Indonesia

Route
- Termini: Pasar Senen; Solo Balapan
- Distance travelled: 570 km (354 mil)
- Average journey time: 7 hours 48 minutes
- Service frequency: Daily each way
- Train number: 75-76

On-board services
- Classes: executive & economy
- Seating arrangements: 50 seats arranged 2-2 (executive class); 72 seats arranged 2-2 (economy class)
- Catering facilities: On-board cafe and trolley service

Technical
- Rolling stock: CC206; CC203; CC201
- Track gauge: 1067 mm
- Operating speed: 80 km/h (50 mph) to 120 km/h (75 mph)
Route map

Mataram train is a passenger train operated by Kereta Api Indonesia between Pasar Senen and Solo Balapan via Purwokerto and Yogyakarta.

The train travels once daily each way, heading to Jakarta Pasar Senen in the morning, and Solo Balapan, covering around 570 km (354 mil) in 7 hours, 48 minutes.

== Name ==
The name Mataram is taken from the 16th century Mataram Sultanate which at its peak controlled Central Java, the Special Region of Yogyakarta, most of East Java, and West Java. It and its Sunans left a mark in Javanese and Indonesian culture and history.

== History ==
The Mataram train began traveling from the Senja Mataram with the Fajar Pajajaran train in 1992. The Lodaya changed it on 12 May 2000 to begin at Bandung.

Before the Mataram train operated, in 2016, PT KAI added a train service on the route with the name Extraordinary train (KLB) Economy LPN-PSE which operated on weekends using a series of economy plus class trains made by PT INKA,

On 15 June 2017, PT KAI launched the Mataram Premium train as additional service during the 2017 Eid homecoming season. Due to its high occupancy, the train operated regularly. PT KAI then changed the premium economy class to executive and business class starting 17 February 2019, and extended the service to Solo Balapan Station starting 1 December 2019. The Mataram train operates with two executive class cars, seven premium economy class cars, one dining car, and one power car.

This train assists the duties of the Progo, Gajahwong, Bogowonto, and Jaka Tingkir trains which have the same relationship.

Began on 9 December 2024, the Mataram train adopted the latest generation of economy class trains and the latest generation of executive class trains owned by Argo Lawu/Argo Dwipangga made of stainless steel made by PT INKA Madiun. On 1 February 2025, the Mataram train switched to one daily service (example; morning schedule bound from Solo Balapan to Pasar Senen, while night schedule bound from Pasar Senen to Solo Balapan).

== Stations ==
- Pasar Senen (Start/End)
- Jatinegara
- Bekasi
- Haurgeulis
- Jatibarang
- Cirebon
- Bumiayu
- Purwokerto
- Kroya
- Gombong
- Kebumen
- Kutoarjo
- Wates
- Yogyakarta
- Klaten
- Solo Balapan (Start/End)

== Incidents ==
- On 20 September 2025 at 00.07, the 76 Mataram train crashed into a Sand Truck in Indramayu Regency.
- On 19 October 2025, the Mataram train heading to Pasar Senen collided with a MBG Van in Dewi Village, Bayan, Purworejo Regency.

== See also ==
- Argo Lawu
- Argo Dwipangga
- Lodaya
- Manahan
