= Gajahwong =

Passenger train service in Indonesia

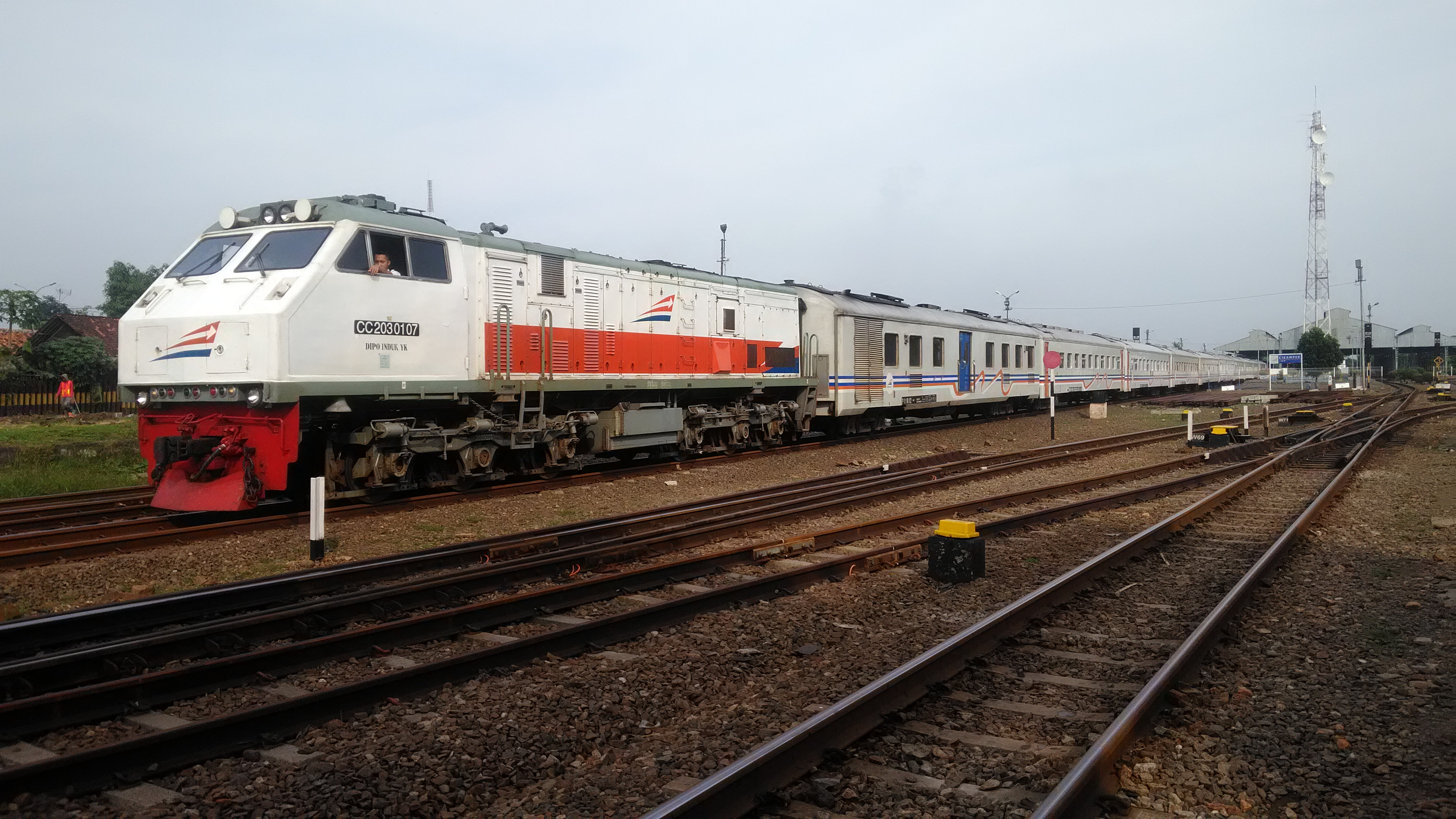
- Gajahwong train passed in Cikampek heading to Lempuyangan, 2019

Overview
- Service type: Inter-city rail
- Status: Operational
- Locale: Operational Area VI Yogyakarta
- First service: 24 August 2011
- Current operator: Kereta Api Indonesia

Route
- Termini: Pasar Senen; Lempuyangan
- Distance travelled: 512 km (318 mil)
- Average journey time: 7 hours 53 minutes
- Service frequency: daily each way
- Train number: 105-106

On-board services
- Classes: economy, priority, and executive
- Seating arrangements: 50 seats arranged 2-2 (executive class); 80 seats arranged 2-2 (premium economy class); 28 seats arranged 2-2 (priority class)
- Catering facilities: On-board cafe and trolley service
- Observation facilities: The duplex panoramic glass, with blinds, heat insulating laminated layer
- Entertainment facilities: free Wi-Fi, Air conditioning Passenger information system, USB, etc

Technical
- Rolling stock: CC206; CC203; CC201
- Track gauge: 1,067 mm
- Operating speed: 80–120 kilometres per hour (50–75 mph)
Route map

Gajahwong is an passenger train with the executive, premium economy, and priority class that is operated by Kereta Api Indonesia which between Pasar Senen and Lempuyangan, the trip around 512 km (318 mil) in 7 hours 53 minutes.

The Gajahwong train journey to Jakarta (Pasar Senen) is done at night, while the journey to Yogyakarta (Lempuyangan) is done in the morning—this train is the opposite of the Bogowonto train.

== Branding ==
Name of the Gajah Wong itself origin comes from the name of the river that flows through most of the Special Region of Yogyakarta, namely Sleman Regency, Bantul Regency, and the eastern part of Yogyakarta, named, Gajahwong River which is located east of the initial station of the train, Lempuyangan.

== History ==
The Gajahwong train was first inaugurated by the then Minister of Transportation (Indonesia), Freddy Numberi, at Jakarta Kota railway station on 24 August 2011 together with the i9000 series electric rail train and is the second economy train made at PT INKA that is equipped with air conditioning after the Bogowonto train.

The Gajahwong train will operate again on 1 June 2023 along with the implementation of the enactment of new train travel chart 2023 (Gapeka 2023). Currently, the Gajahwong train operational facilities use a series of stainless steel Executive and Premium Economy classes from the Lodaya train series.

The Gajahwong train uses the latest generation stainless steel executive and economy train series made by PT INKA, this series is only temporary; before returning to using the 1st generation series of stainless steel executive and premium train sets.

== Station ==
The Gajahwong train route from Jakarta to Lempuyangan, Yogyakarta based from the Gapeka 2025 is:

- Pasar Senen (Start/End)
- Jatinegara
- Bekesi
- Jatibarang
- Cirebon Prujakan
- Bumiayu
- Purwokerto
- Kroya
- Gombong
- Karanganyar
- Kebumen
- Kutowinangun
- Kutoarjo
- Wates
- Yogyakarta
- Lempuyangan (Start/End)

== Incident ==
- On 18 May 2015, The Gajahwong train hit a car driven by two assistant directors from Hanung Bramantyo, Sukardi and Agus Nugroho, at a level crossing no a barrier in Argomulyo, Sedayu, Bantul, resulting in both victims suffering injuries.

== See also ==
- Progo
- Bogowonto
- Argo Dwipangga
- Lodaya
