= Lempuyangan railway station =

Railway station in Indonesia

Y02 JS04 Lempuyangan Station Stasiun Lempuyangan ꦱꦼꦠꦱꦶꦪꦸꦤ꧀ꦊꦩ꧀ꦥꦸꦪꦔꦤ꧀
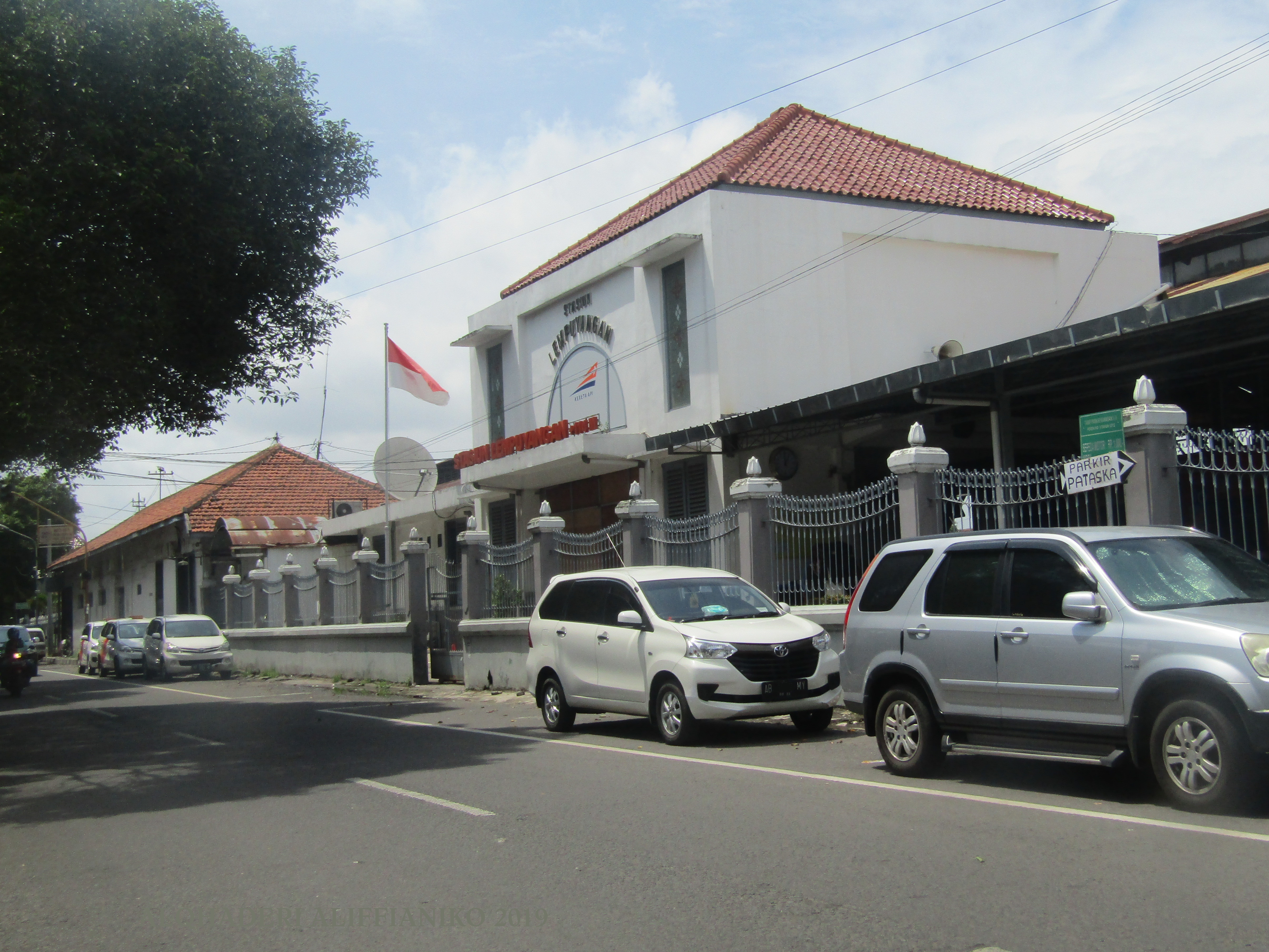
- Front of the station

General information
- Location: Lempuyangan Street, Bausasran, Danurejan, Yogyakarta; Special Region of Yogyakarta; Indonesia
- Coordinates: 7°47′25″S 110°22′32″E
- Elevation: +114 m (374 ft)
- System: Commuter and inter-city rail station
- Owner: Kereta Api Indonesia
- Operator: Kereta Api Indonesia; KAI Commuter
- Lines: Yogyakarta Line; Joglosemarkerto
- Platforms: 1 side platform 4 island platforms
- Tracks: 11
- Connections: Trans Jogja: Line 10 (Stasiun Lempuyangan)

Construction
- Structure type: Ground
- Parking: Available
- Accessible: Accessible

Other information
- Station code: LPN • 3030
- Classification: Large class type B

History
- Opened: 2 March 1872
- Former names: Djocja Lempoejangan Station

Services
Preceding station	Kereta Api Indonesia	Following station
Maguwo towards Purwosari	Kutoarjo–Purwosari	Yogyakarta towards Kutoarjo
Preceding station		Following station
Yogyakarta Terminus	Yogyakarta Line	Maguwo towards Palur
Location
- Location within Yogyakarta

Lempuyangan Station (Javanese: ꦱꦼꦠꦱꦶꦪꦸꦤ꧀ꦊꦩ꧀ꦥꦸꦪꦔꦤ꧀, romanized: Setasiyun Lempuyangan; LPN) is a railway station located in Bausasran, Danurejan, Yogyakarta, Indonesia. It is 1 kilometre (0.62 mi) east of Yogyakarta Station, 114 metres (374 ft) above sea level. The station is part of Operational Area VI Yogyakarta. It has 11 lines, including two straight tracks.

Opened on 2 March 1872, Lempuyangan Station is used for passengers and local freight. The station has signage with travel information: train capacity and route details, such as the distance between stations. A screen displays train arrivals and departures, similar to an airport.

== History ==
Lempuyangan Station was inaugurated on 2 March 1872 by the Dutch East Indies private railway company, Nederlandsch-Indische Spoorweg Maatschappij (NIS) as the end point of the Semarang–Solo–Yogyakarta cross-rail line and is the first and oldest train station in Yogyakarta. The construction of this station was motivated by the policy of transporting sugar by using the railroad mode of transportation—in the 1870s many sugar industries had sprung up in Yogyakarta, which were entirely managed by the Dutch. The presence of this station contributed to the development of the people of Yogyakarta at that time.

This station has long been used as the departure station for economy class trains from Yogyakarta, in contrast to other stations in Java which generally serve economy series stops after the policy of separating station services for economy and non-economy train passengers. When all other economy trains were still departing from Yogyakarta Tugu Station, this station was already the terminal station for the Empu Jaya train bound for Jakarta Pasar Senen (now Progo) and the Argopuro train bound for Banyuwangi (now Sri Tanjung).

== Building and layout ==
Lempuyangan Station has eleven train tracks. Originally only line 4 was a straight track. After the construction of the Surakarta–Yogyakarta double track section was completed on 8 January 2007, track 3 was also used as a straight track. To the north of track 5 is a spur to the Yogyakarta Warehousing and Logistics Center (formerly the NIS roundhouse) and Yogyakarta railway workshop which is the largest train workshop in Java. The station has been equipped with signages, track directions accompanied by distance traveled, and screens to monitor train departures and arrivals in real time.

In 2009, the station underwent overall repairs by adding a new building east of the old building.

In mid-2017, the station area underwent another renovation. The An-Nuur Mosque, located west of the station building, was opened to the general public, while the prayer room located to the east is only used for passengers who have boarded or have not yet left. Expansion was also carried out in the parking lot and the extension of the station canopy roof. In 2018–2019, the An-Nuur Mosque was demolished to make other facilities. Since March 2020, the vacant land located on the west side of Lempuyangan Station has been developed into a RailExpress warehouse (now KAI Logistik Ekspres).

Regarding the project to upgrade the train's electrical signaling system at the station, a new electric system produced by Len Industri as of April 2021 has been installed which will replace the old system produced by Siemens. It has been active since September 2021.

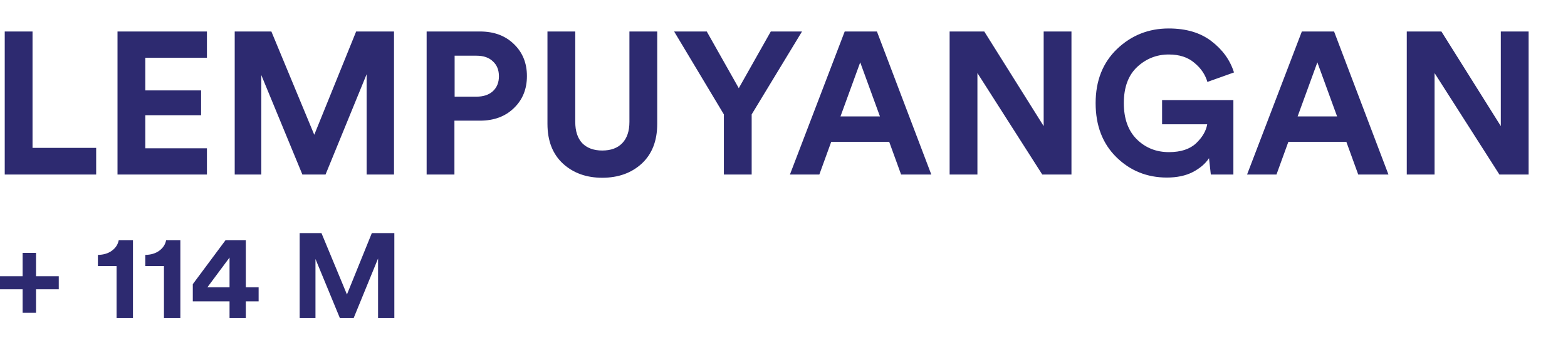
Y02
P Platform floor	Line 9	Cement train parking
P Platform floor	Line 8	Cement train parking
P Platform floor	Line 7	Cement train parking
P Platform floor	Line 6	Freight train stop
P Platform floor	Island platform
P Platform floor	Line 5	Freight train parking
P Platform floor	Island platform
P Platform floor	Line 4	Straight tracks to Yogyakarta
P Platform floor	Line 3	Straight tracks to Solo Balapan
P Platform floor	Island platform
P Platform floor	Line 2	Inter-city and Central Java-Yogyakarta local train stop ← (Yogyakarta) Yogyakarta Line to Yogyakarta and Solo Balapan (Maguwo) →
P Platform floor	Island platform, the doors are opened on the left side of the train arrival from the east and on the right side of the train arrival from the west
P Platform floor	Line 1	← (Yogyakarta) Yogyakarta Line to Yogyakarta and Solo Balapan (Maguwo) →
P Platform floor	Side platform, the doors are opened on the left side
P Platform floor	G	South entrance gate

== Services ==
=== Intercity trains ===
Mixed class

- Gaya Baru Malam Selatan to Pasar Senen via Purwokerto-Cirebon Prujakan and Surabaya Gubeng via Purwosari-Madiun-Jombang (executive-economy plus)
- Singasari to Pasar Senen via Purwokerto-Cirebon and Blitar via Purwosari-Madiun (executive-economy plus)
- Joglosemarkerto loop line through Central Java to Semarang Tawang via Purwokerto and Solo Balapan (executive-economy plus)
- Mataram to Pasar Senen via Purwokerto Cirebon Prujakan and Solo Balapan (executive-premium economy)
- Logawa to Purwokerto and Jember via Purwosari-Madiun-Jombang-Surabaya Gubeng (business-economy)

Economy Plus class

- Jaka Tingkir to Pasar Senen via Purwokerto-Cirebon Prujakan and Purwosari
- Bogowonto to Pasar Senen via Purwokerto-Cirebon Prujakan
- Gajahwong to Pasar Senen via Purwokerto-Cirebon Prujakan

Economy class

- Pasundan to Kiaracondong via Tasikmalaya and Surabaya Gubeng via Purwosari-Madiun-Jombang
- Kahuripan to Kiaracondong via Tasikmalaya and Blitar via Purwosari-Madiun
- Bengawan to Pasar Senen via Purwokerto-Cirebon Prujakan and Purwosari
- Progo to Pasar Senen via Purwokerto-Cirebon Prujakan
- Sri Tanjung to Ketapang via Purwosari-Madiun-Jombang-Surabaya Kota

=== Commuter rail ===
- Yogyakarta Line runs to Yogyakarta and Palur

== Supporting transportation ==
There are a number of Trans Jogja bus stops nearby the station. The Stasiun Lempuyangan bus stop serves Line 10. Another bus stop is Lempuyangan, which serves Line 4A and 4B alongside Line 10.

Type	Route	Destination
Trans Jogja	2B	Condongcatur Bus Terminal–Jombor Bus Terminal (via Gejayan, Yogyakarta State University, Gadjah Mada University campus, Kridosono, Mandala Krida, Gembira Loka, SMP N 9, XT Square, Purawisata, Taman Pintar, Pasar Serangan, Perpusda, Borobudur Plaza, AM Sangaji, Monjali)
Trans Jogja	4A	Giwangan Bus Terminal–XT Square (via Taman Siswa, Gadjah Mada University Biology Museum, Hayam Wuruk, Cik Di Tiro, Gadjah Mada University campus, Panti Rapih, Kridosono, UIN, APMD, Yogyakarta State University, UAD)
Trans Jogja	4B	Giwangan Bus Terminal–Gadjah Mada University Academic Hospital (via East Imogiri, Laksda Adisutjipto, Gadjah Mada University campus, Urip Soemohardjo)
Trans Jogja	10	Gamping park and ride–Giwangan Bus Terminal (via Ngabean, Titik Nol Kilometer Yogyakarta, Suryotomo, Kridosono, Kenari, Bausasran, Mataram, Malioboro)
Teman Bus Yogyakarta	2A	Jombor Bus Terminal–Condongcatur Bus Terminal (via AM Sangaji, Malioboro, Gembira Loka, Mandala Krida, Kridosono, Gadjah Mada University campus, Yogyakarta State University)

== Incidents ==
- On 19 February 2007, there was a small tornado that hit Yogyakarta which resulted in the canopy of Lempuyangan Station being badly damaged. Even so, communication via train automatic telephone and walkie talkies continued normally and there were no interruptions to train travel.
- On 20 October 2016, a foreign tourist at Lempuyangan Station was killed by a Joglokerto train that was about to stop on line 1. It was not clear if this was an accident or suicide. According to the officer's statement, the tourist walked towards the rails when the train was about to pass. Other people tried to stop her, but were unable to do so.

== See also ==
- List of railway stations in Indonesia
- Rail transport in Indonesia
