= Bogowonto =

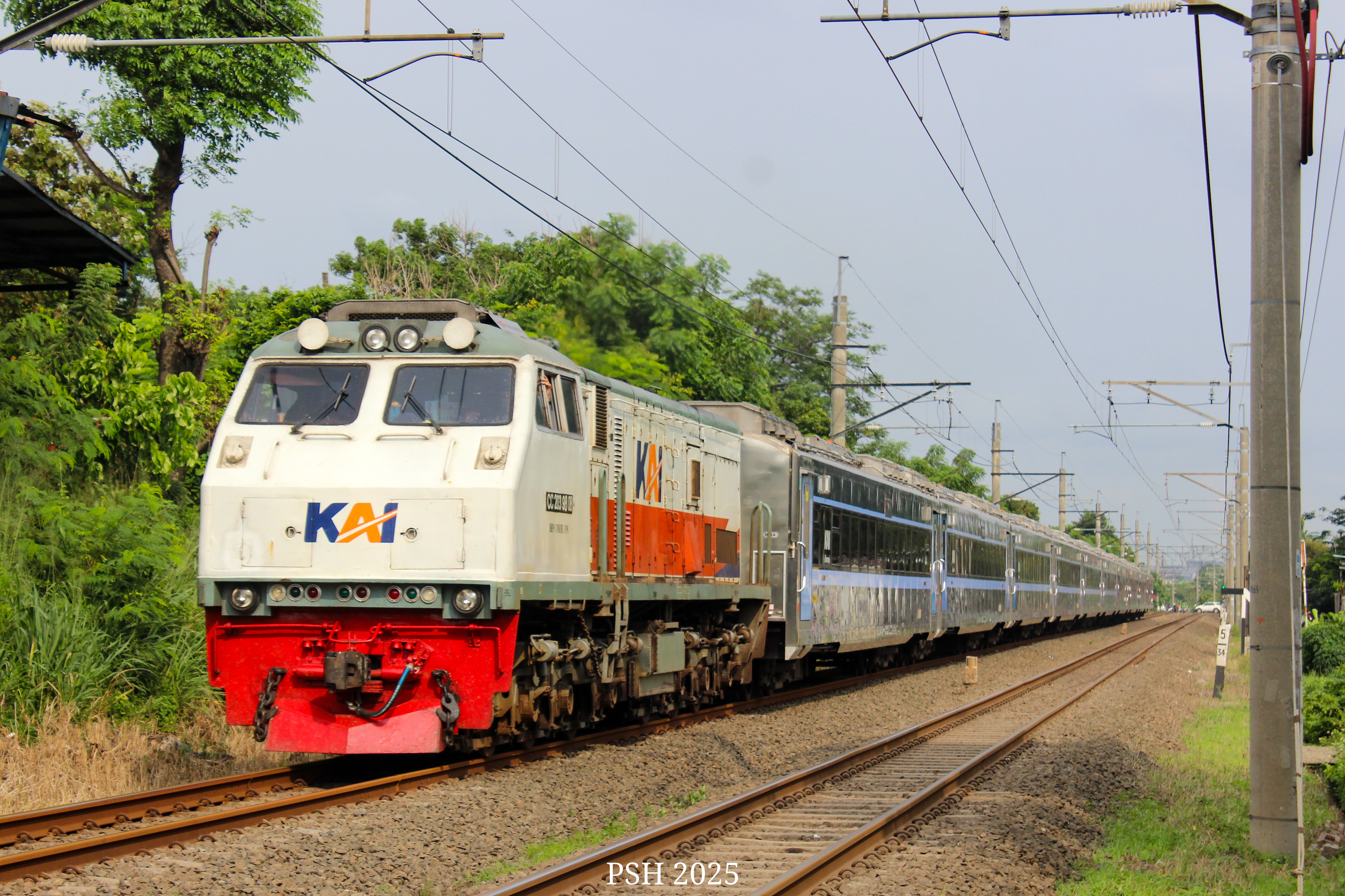
- Bogowonto train use the Logawa New Generation stainless steel sets, 2025

Overview
- Service type: Inter-city rail
- Status: Operational
- First service: 3 September 2010
- Current operator: Kereta Api Indonesia

Route
- Termini: Pasar Senen; Lempuyangan
- Distance travelled: 512 km (318 mil)
- Average journey time: 7 hours 37 minutes
- Service frequency: 1x daily each way
- Train number: 103-104

On-board services
- Classes: executive & economy
- Seating arrangements: 50 seats arranged 2-2 (executive class); 72 seats arranged 2-2 (economy class)
- Catering facilities: On-board cafe and trolley service

Technical
- Rolling stock: CC206; CC203; CC201
- Track gauge: 1067 mm
- Operating speed: 80 km/h (50 mph) to 120 km/h (75 mph)
Route map

Bogowonto train is a passenger train with the executive & economy class that is operated by Kereta Api Indonesia that connects between Pasar Senen and Lempuyangan via Purwokerto.

The train offer only once daily each way around 512 km (318 mil) in 7 hours 37 minutes for travel from Jakarta to Yogyakarta via Lempuyangan. The Bogowonto train also support for the Progo and Gajahwong at the same route but different schedule.

== Branding ==
The name Bogowonto is taken from the name of the river that flows through the sub-districts in Wonosobo Regency and Purworejo Regency, Central Java and flows into the Indian Ocean, named Bogowonto River. The river is located in Purworejo District, east of Kutoarjo Station.

== History ==
On 3 September 2010, the Bogowonto train was launched by KAI as the first time travel between Pasar Senen & Lempuyangan via Purwokerto-Kutoarjo railway line. The Bogowonto train is the first economy class train sets that produced by PT INKA equipped with air conditioning.

After simplifying the train line and arranging travel times, the departure time of the Bogowonto train was changed to daytime and the service route was extended to Lempuyangan Station starting 1 March 2012.

=== Train sets ===
Initially, the Bogowonto train was an idle train belonging to the Mutiara Timur which didn't operate every day, because the original train was undergoing temporary conservation. Also, the train belonging to the Mutiara Timur train, which is the Ministry of Transportation's Economy, originally belonged to the Bogowonto and Gajahwong trains which had been transferred to the KTG Depot from YK, and also the train belonging to the Mutiara Timur train, which was originally Stainless Steel, had been transferred to several other Daop. The Bogowonto train is a twin of the Gajahwong train, but the Gajahwong train has Facultative status (operating on certain days).

In December 2022, the train belonging to the Mutiara Timur train was finally transferred to the KTG Depot for the operation of the Blambangan Ekspress route Ketapang–Semarang Tawang. During the Christmas and New Year 2023 holidays, the Bogowonto Train used a series of economy class trains plus the results of modifications, a passenger capacity of 80 seats with a 2-2 configuration no disabled cars and no executive class cars, this series was also used by the Bogowonto Train during the 2022 Eid al-Fitr holiday with an AC Split economy train, a passenger capacity of 106 seats with a 3-2 configuration. Now as of Gapeka 2023, the Bogowonto train is back to using stainless steel trains from the Yogyakarta Main Depot.

=== Present Operating ===
At the end of January 2023, or after the 2023 Christmas and New Year (Nataru) transportation period ended, the Bogowonto train's train were replaced again, specifically using stainless steel trains transferred from the Tanjungkarang Station (TNK) Depot, which previously housed trains from the Sriwijaya Limex Sriwijaya train (now defunct).

These stainless steel trains were also originally used for the YK-GMR Supplementary Train and the Lodaya Supplementary Train. However, because the 2023 Christmas and New Year transportation period had ended, these trains were "idle" at the YK Depot before finally being used for the current Bogowonto train operation. The Bogowonto train's modified K3 was then borrowed by the Menoreh Train for the Semarang-Tawang-Jakarta Kota route. Finally, the modified K3 trains used by the Menoreh train were exchanged for K3 trains belonging to the Ministry of Transportation, owned by Bangunkarta.

The Bogowonto train now uses B40 fuel, which uses 60% diesel and 40% palm oil.

On 31 January 2023, the Bogowonto train uses the latest generation of mixed executive and economy class trains made of stainless steel made by PT INKA Madiun. The Bogowonto train on this new generation economy train has been handed over from the Logawa TSC-14 series, while the executive train uses the used TSB-23 from the Direct Train train series on the Semarang–Jakarta route, for the premium economy train series will be transferred to the Purwokerto Depot (PWT) to replace the Logawa train series that has been transferred to the YK Depot.

== Station ==
The Bogowonto train route from Jakarta to Lempuyangan, Yogyakarta based from the Gapeka 2025 is:

- Pasar Senen (Start/End)
- Jatinegara
- Bekesi
- Cikarang
- Jatibarang
- Cirebon Prujakan
- Bumiayu
- Purwokerto
- Kroya
- Gombong
- Kebumen
- Kutowinangun
- Kutoarjo
- Wates
- Yogyakarta
- Lempuyangan (Start/End)

== Incident ==
- On 4 May 2014, a Bogowonto train bound for Lempuyangan Station and its power train ("P 0 08 01") pulled by locomotive CC206 13 69 YK overturned after hitting a container truck in Cirebon, West Java. There were no fatalities, but the driver and several passengers were injured. This incident caused delays in train schedules and made evacuation difficult due to the heavy load of the CC 206.

== See also ==
- Lodaya
- Logawa
- Progo
- Bangunkarta
