= Joglosemarkerto =

Passenger train in Indonesia

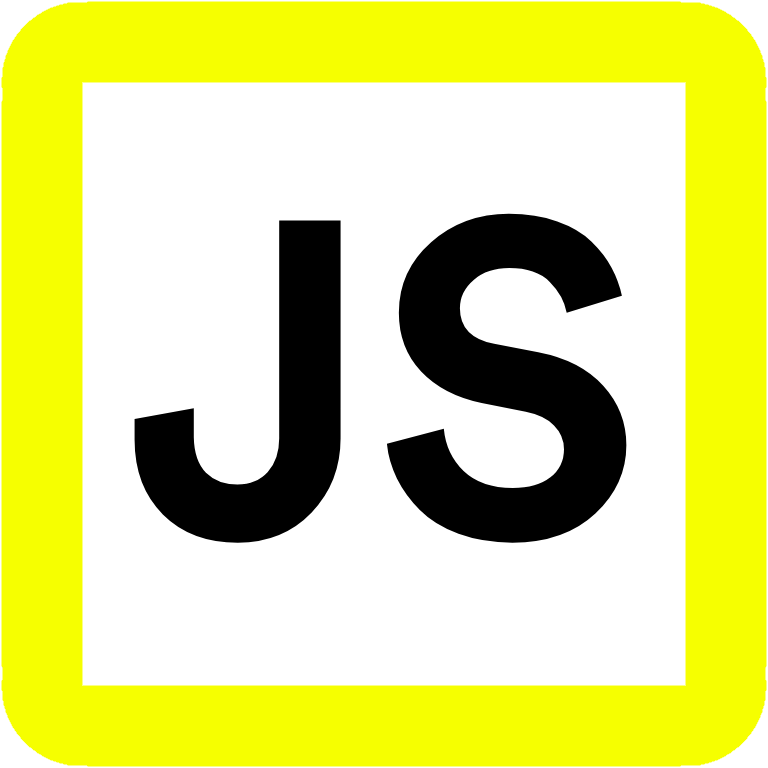
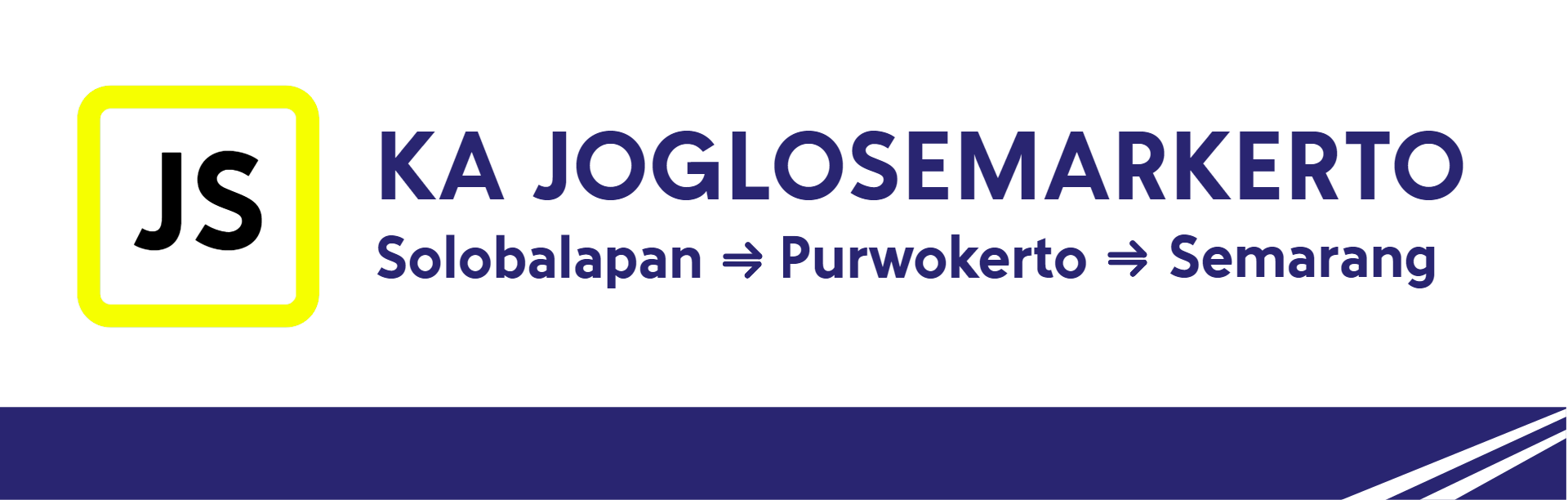
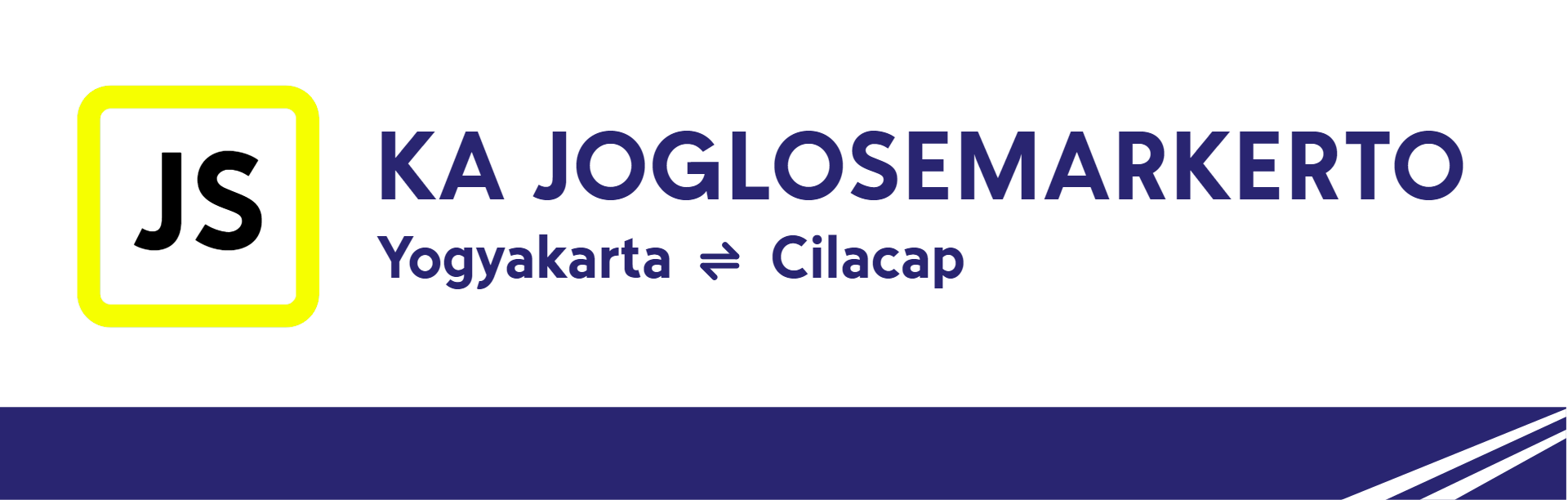

Overview
- Service type: Regional rail
- Status: Operational
- Locale: Operational Area V Purwokerto and Operational VI Yogyakarta
- Predecessor: Joglo Express (Yogyakarta-Solo line (2014-2015)); Joglokerto (Solo-Purwokerto line (2015-2018)); Kalijaga train (Solo-Semarang line via Gundih (2014-2019))
- First service: 1 December 2018
- Current operator: Kereta Api Indonesia

Route
- Termini: Solo Balapan (for loop line); Cilacap (for Cilacap-Yogyakarta line)
- Distance travelled: 578 kilometres (359 miles) (loop line); 173 kilometres (107 miles) (YK-CP line)
- Average journey time: 12 hours 52 minutes (SLO–SMT–TG–PWT–SLO–SMT); 10 hours 30 minutes (SLO–PWT–SMT–SLO); 6 hours 46 minutes (PWT–SMT–SLO); 3 hours 3 minutes (Cilacap–Yogyakarta)
- Service frequency: daily each way
- Train numbers: 185/186 (PWT–SMT–SLO); 187/188/189 (SLO–SMT–TG–PWT–SLO–SMT); 193/192 (SLO–PWT–TG–SMT–SLO); 201–202 (Cilacap–Yogyakarta)

On-board services
- Classes: executive and economy (Central Java–Yogyakarta Circle) executive and premium economy (Cilacap–Yogyakarta)
- Seating arrangements: 50 seats arranged 2-2 (executive class); 72 seats arranged 2-2 (economy class); 64 seats arranged 2-2 (premium economy class); 80 seats arranged 2-2 (premium economy class)
- Catering facilities: On-board cafe and trolley service

Technical
- Rolling stock: CC206; CC203; CC201
- Track gauge: 1,067 mm
- Operating speed: 70–100 kilometres per hour (43–62 mph)
Route map

Joglosemarkerto is a regional passenger rail service in Indonesia operated by Kereta Api Indonesia (KAI). It serves a loop route connecting major cities in Central Java and Yogyakarta, including Solo Balapan, Semarang Tawang, Purwokerto, and the Cilacap–Yogyakarta corridor. On route maps, Joglosemarkerto services are shown in bright yellow ( ).

The service was introduced on 1 December 2018 through the merger of two existing trains, the Kamandaka and the Joglokerto Express, in order to streamline operations and improve passenger occupancy on the Yogyakarta–Semarang corridor without requiring transfers in Purwokerto or Solo Balapan.

The name "Joglosemarkerto" is a portmanteau of the names of the main cities and regencies along its route: Jogja, Solo, Semarang, and Purwokerto.

== History ==
Before Joglosemarkerto was introduced, the Semarang–Solo–Yogyakarta–Purwokerto corridor was already served by several trains such as Kamandaka, Kalijaga, Joglokerto, and Joglosemar. However, the number of available trips was still limited, so many passengers traveling to these cities had to stop at major stations along the route.

Joglosemarkerto service was launched by Kereta Api Indonesia on 1 December 2018 to improve regional mobility and tourism connectivity in Central Java. The circular route connects Semarang, Solo, Yogyakarta, Kroya, Purwokerto, Tegal, and Pekalongan, covering about 579 kilometers, with three daily departure points from Semarang Tawang, Solo Balapan, and Purwokerto.

On 1 February 2019, the operating pattern was adjusted, with the Kamandaka train reinstated on the Purwokerto–Semarang Tawang route. Initially, loop-line ticketing was only available for the Solo Balapan–Solo Balapan route, but was later expanded to include Yogyakarta–Yogyakarta and Semarang Tawang–Semarang Tawang.

Further development occurred on 25 February 2022, when Joglosemarkerto added a Cilacap–Yogyakarta service using trains 223–224 (Wijayakusuma) and 231–232 (Mutiara Timur idle set).

Beginning on 15 December 2024, Joglosemarkerto, along with the Argo Merbabu, Banyubiru, Gaya Baru Malam Selatan and Kamandaka trains, began using the latest generation of modified economy-class train sets. These carriages were modified at Manggarai Railway Workshop, with their seating capacity reduced from 80 to 72 seats to provide more space and comfort for passengers.

In 2025, Joglosemarkerto became one of the busiest train services operated by KAI. The train recorded high seat occupancy reaching 230 percent on the Solo Balapan–Semarang Tawang route and 223 percent on the return route. This was possible because seats were used by different passengers at different stations along the journey. During the same period, the route ranked as the most popular commercial train service by total passengers, showing its importance for travel and tourism in Central Java and Yogyakarta.

== See also ==
- Kamandaka
- Prambanan Express Commuter Line
