= Progo =

Passenger train service between Jakarta & Lempuyangan, Yogyakarta, Indonesia

Progo train

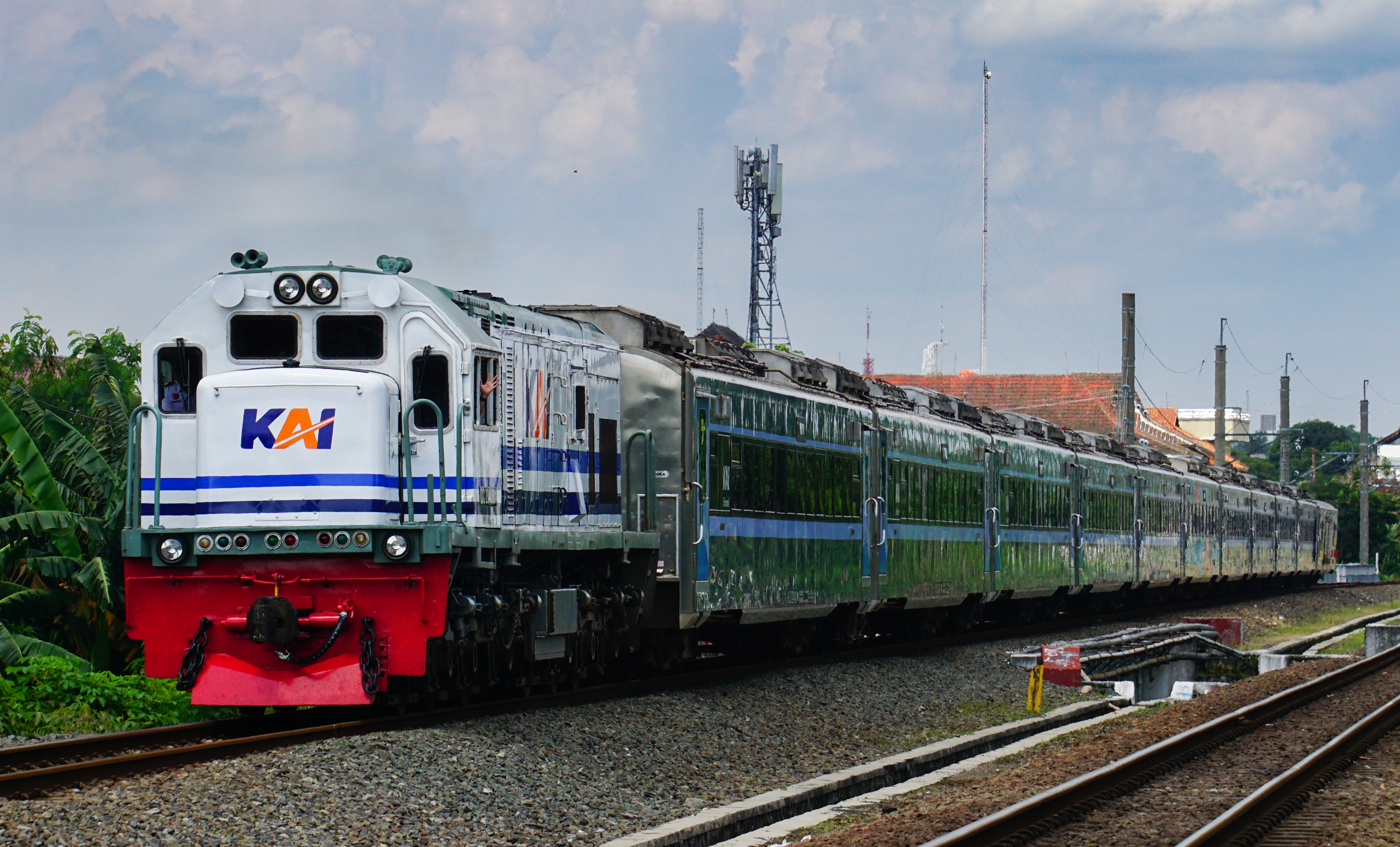
- Progo train with CC204 WnB locomotive passed at Yogyakarta, 2026

Overview
- Service type: Inter-city rail
- Status: Operational
- Predecessor: Senja Economy; Empu Jaya
- First service: 4 June 2004
- Current operator: Kereta Api Indonesia

Route
- Termini: Lempuyangan; Pasar Senen
- Distance travelled: 512 km (318 mil)
- Average journey time: 7 hours 28 minutes
- Service frequency: 1x daily each way
- Train number: 257-258

On-board services
- Class: economy
- Seating arrangements: 72 seats arranged 2-2 (economy class)
- Catering facilities: On-board cafe and trolley service

Technical
- Rolling stock: CC206; CC203; CC201
- Track gauge: 1067 mm
- Operating speed: 80 km/h (50 mph) to 120 km/h (75 mph)
Route map

Progo train is an passenger train with the economy class that is operated by Kereta Api Indonesia which between Lempuyangan, Yogyakarta & Pasar Senen via Purwokerto.

The train offer only 1x daily each way around 512 km (318 mil) in 7 hours 28 minutes for travel from Jakarta to Yogyakarta via Lempuyangan.

== Branding ==
The name Progo comes from the name of one of the rivers that divides Bantul Regency, Kulon Progo, and Sleman, DI Yogyakarta, namely, Kali Progo.

== History ==
=== Introduction ===
The Progo train was first time operate by KAI in 1970s as the one train "Senja" or in English is Dawn. After being reorganized, the Progo train underwent a name change to Senja Economy Yogya in the 1980s with the route Yogyakarta–Gambir. This train route was then changed to Lempuyangan–Pasar Senen.

In 1995, along with the replacement of the entire train set, the train again underwent a name change to Empu Jaya, which is an abbreviation of "Lempuyangan–Jakarta". On 4 June 2002, the name was changed again to Progo in line with the many accidents on the Empu Jaya train.

=== Present ===
Formerly, the Progo train had received a public service obligation (PSO) subsidy from the government until April 2016. Since the fare subsidy was revoked, this train has added executive class several times to increase passenger capacity, although this is relatively rare.

Since effect of the Gapeka 2021 on 10 February 2021, the Progo train were once transferred from Yogyakarta Operations Area VI to Jakarta Operations Area I, and the trains were transferred to the Jakarta Kota Train Depot (JAKK). However, as of 1 June 2023, starting with the implementation of the train travel chart (Gapeka 2023), the operation of this train was returned to Yogyakarta Operations Area VI and the trains were transferred back to the Yogyakarta Main Depot.

On 15 October 2024, the Progo train officially started using the new generation of economy class trains made of stainless steel made by PT INKA Madiun. the Progo train sets consists of eight economy class carriages, one executive class dining carriage, and one power train carriage.

== Station ==
The Progo train route from Jakarta to Lempuyangan, Yogyakarta based from the Gapeka 2025 is:

- Pasar Senen (Start/End)
- Jatinegara
- Bekesi
- Haurgeulis
- Cirebon Prujakan
- Ketanggungan
- Prupuk
- Purwokerto
- Kroya
- Gombong
- Karanganyar
- Kebumen
- Kutowinangun
- Kutoarjo
- Wates
- Lempuyangan (Start/End)

== Incident ==
- On 25 December 2001 during the Christmas at 04.33, the 146 Progo train collision with the 153 Gaya Baru Malam Selatan train who were waiting to cross on track 3 of the West Ketanggungan Station emplacement. The collision occurred because KA 146 violated the signal entering Ketanggungan Barat station which was red (a sign that the train must stop). This incident resulted in 31 people being killed and 53 others being seriously injured, including the driver of KA 146.
- On 3 July 2009, the Progo train crashed into a car at a crossing no gates in Gambarsari, Kebasen, Banyumas, when the car broke down. All three people managed to escape.
- A railroad track was set on fire by two students at km 302+01 on 9 April 2015. The two teenagers were arrested by PT KAI officers near Linggapura Station. The incident was reported by a train driver and his assistant while on duty on the Progo train.

== See also ==
- Progo River
- Serayu River
