= Yogyakarta railway station =

Railway station in Indonesia

Y01 P01 YA01 JS05 Yogyakarta Station Stasiun Yogyakarta ꦱꦼꦠꦱꦶꦪꦸꦤ꧀ꦪꦺꦴꦒꦾꦏꦂꦠ
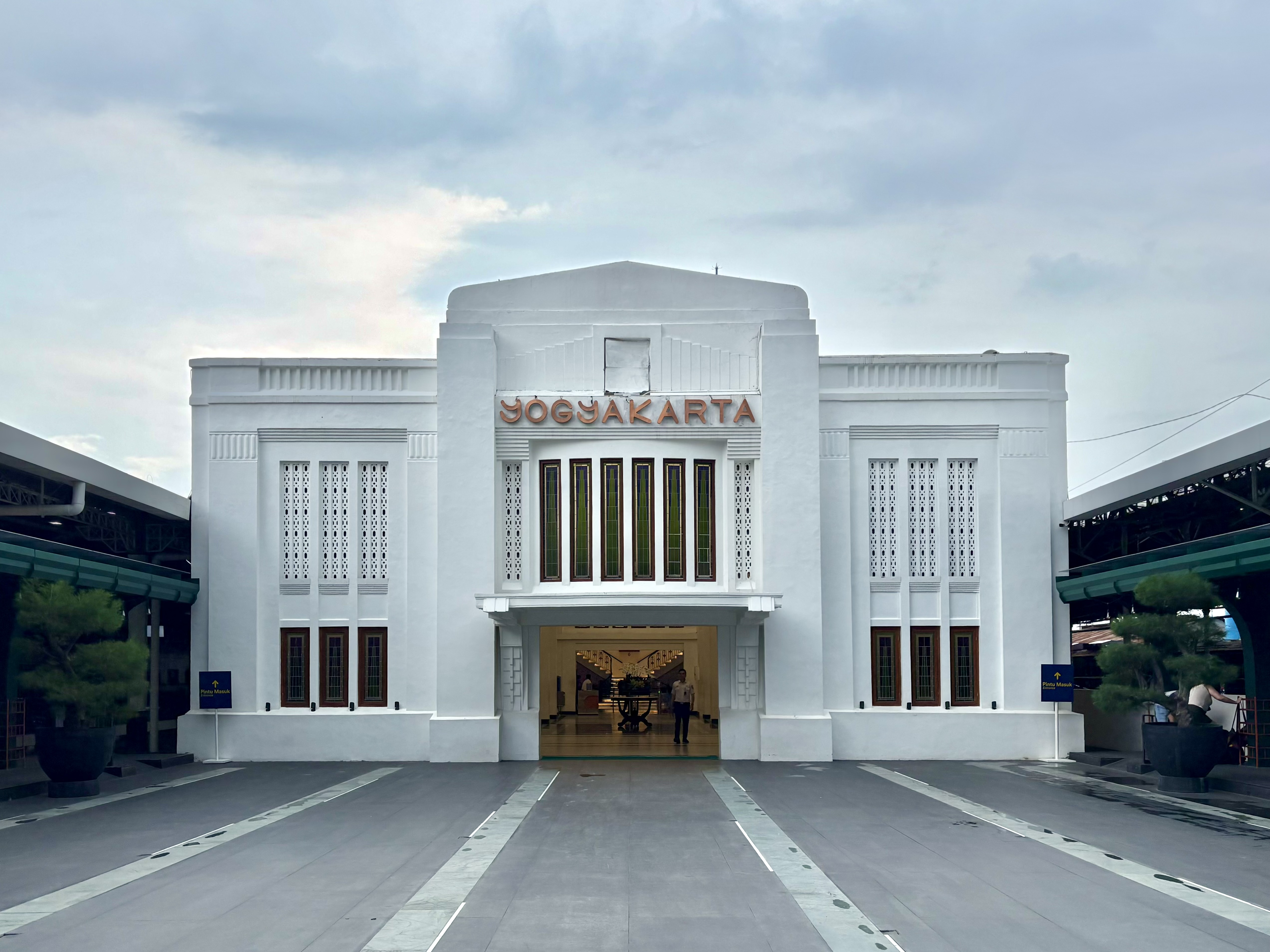
- Front view in 2025

General information
- Other names: Tugu Station
- Location: Jl. Margo Utomo, Sosromenduran, Gedongtengen, Yogyakarta; Special Region of Yogyakarta; Indonesia
- Coordinates: 7°47′21″S 110°21′48″E
- Elevation: +113 m (371 ft)
- System: Commuter, airport, and inter-city rail station
- Owner: Kereta Api Indonesia
- Operator: Kereta Api Indonesia; KAI Commuter; KAI Bandara
- Lines: Yogyakarta Line; Prambanan Express; YIA Airport Rail Link; Joglosemarkerto
- Platforms: 7
- Tracks: 9
- Connections: Trans Jogja Line 1A; Trans Jogja Line 2A; Trans Jogja Line 3A; Trans Jogja Line 8

Construction
- Structure type: Ground
- Parking: Available
- Cycle facilities: Bicycle parking
- Accessible: Available

Other information
- Station code: YK • 0530
- Classification: Large class type A

History
- Opened: 20 July 1887; 139 years ago
- Former names: Djocja Toegoe Station

Services
Preceding station	Kereta Api Indonesia	Following station
Lempuyangan towards Purwosari	Kutoarjo–Purwosari	Patukan towards Kutoarjo
Wates towards Yogyakarta International Airport	Yogyakarta Int'l Airport Rail Link	Terminus
Preceding station		Following station
Terminus	Yogyakarta Line	Lempuyangan towards Palur
Terminus	Prambanan Express	Wates towards Kutoarjo
Location
- Location within Yogyakarta

Yogyakarta Station (Indonesian: Stasiun Yogyakarta, Javanese: ꦱꦼꦠꦱꦶꦪꦸꦤ꧀ꦪꦺꦴꦒꦾꦏꦂꦠ, romanized: Setasiyun Yogyakarta), commonly known as Tugu Station, (lit; Monument Station) (Javanese: ꦱꦼꦠꦱꦶꦪꦸꦤ꧀ꦠꦸꦒꦸ, romanized: Setasiyun Tugu; abbreviation YK, number 3020) is a railway station located in Yogyakarta, Special Region of Yogyakarta, Indonesia. The altitude of this station is +113 m (371 ft) amsl. It is currently operated by the Operational Area VI Yogyakarta of Kereta Api Indonesia.

It is the biggest and most important station in Yogyakarta, located in the heart of the city. This station is adjacent to Jalan Malioboro. The city's other most important station is Lempuyangan railway station.

The station is designated as a cultural heritage by the Government of the Special Region of Yogyakarta. The station and its railway tracks, stretching from west to east, becomes the border of Jetis and Gedongtengen district.

The station serves the departure and arrival of all commercial classes (executive, business, and non-subsidized economy class) train from Jakarta, Bandung, Surabaya, and other cities on the Java Island.

== History ==
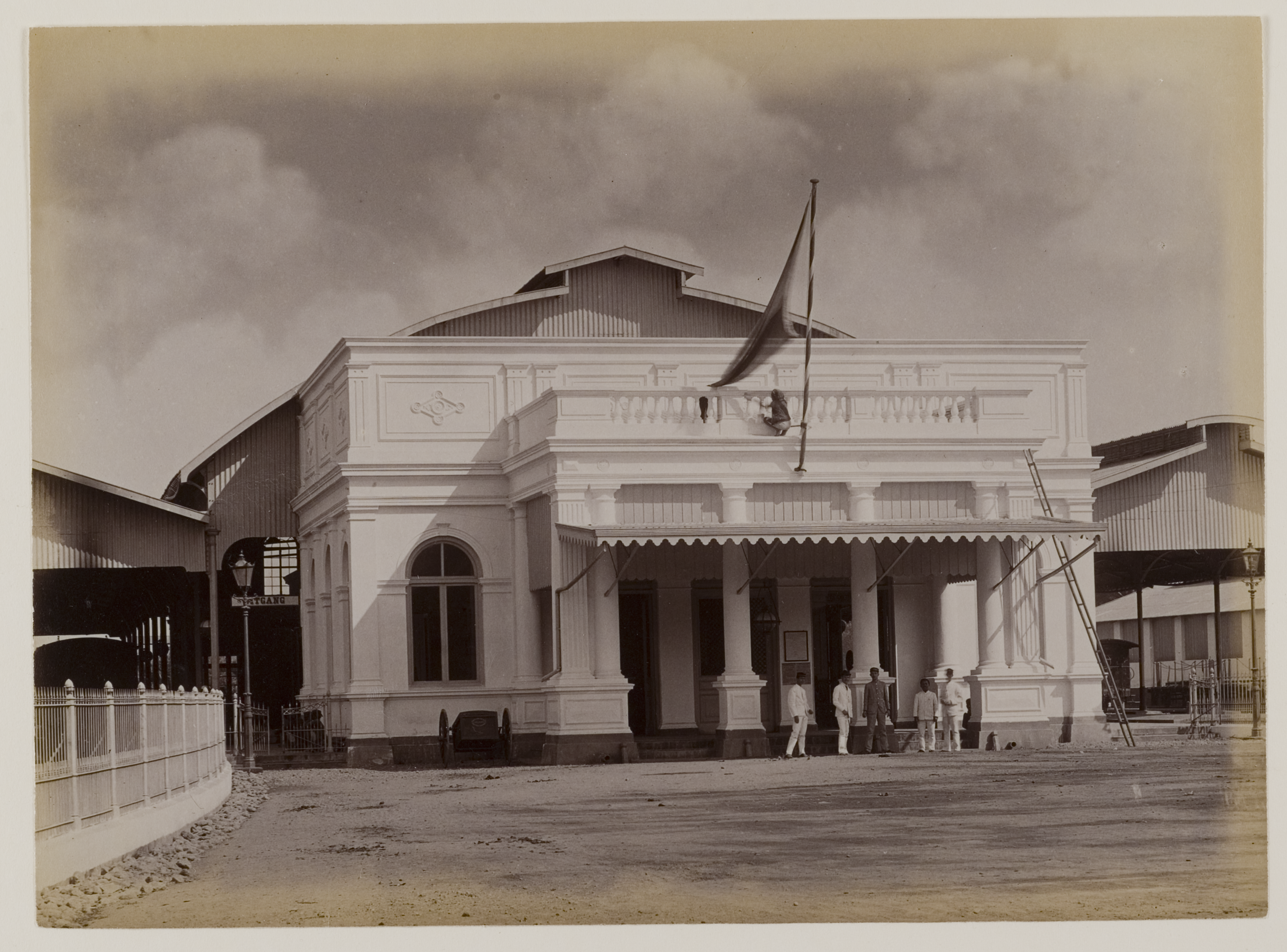
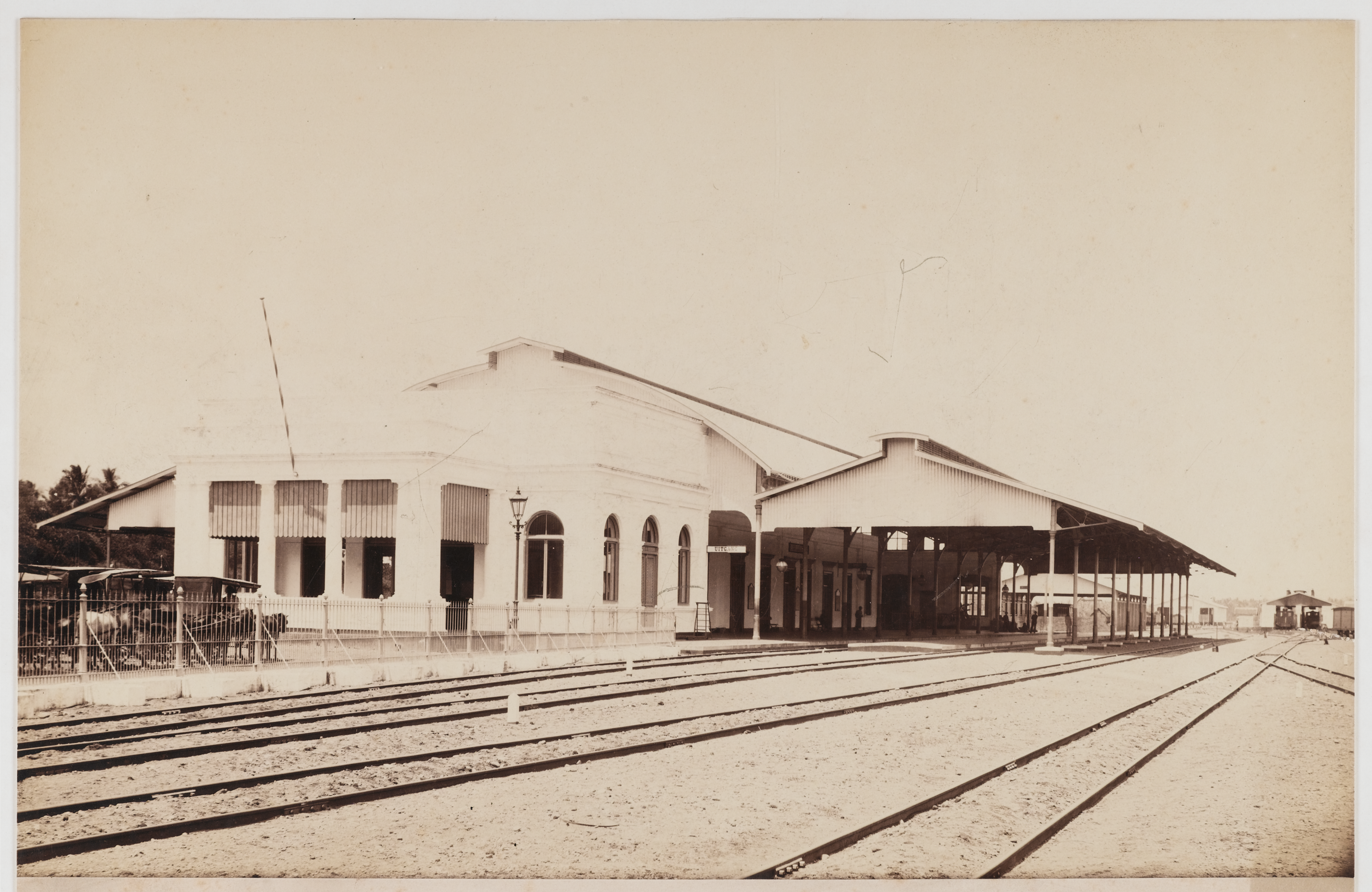
The Yogyakarta Station c. 1890

Staatsspoorwegen (SS) built the railway line from Cilacap towards Yogyakarta as a part of developing Javanese southern line. Yogyakarta Station was opened along with the line opening on 20 July 1887. The southern platform was owned by the first company of Javanese railway system, the Nederlandsch-Indische Spoorweg Maatschappij (NIS) with 1,435-millimetre (56.5 in) gauge, while the northern part was owned by Staatsspoorwegen (SS) with 1,067-millimetre (42.0 in) gauge.

There are two currently abandoned tracks that branched from Yogyakarta Station, each to Bantul and Magelang. To the west of the station were two branch tracks which have all been deactivated, namely the route to Magelang–Parakan and to Palbapang, Bantul. The Magelang route was decommissioned between 1972 and 1976 due to the eruption of Mount Merapi, but traces of this route can still be seen in several places on Jalan Tentara Pelajar, Yogyakarta. The line was linked to the now Ambarawa Railway Museum and ends at Kedungjati, which has also been decommissioned. Apart from that, the Palbapang route was decommissioned in the 1973–1980s, but traces of the route can still be seen in several places, one of which is in the parking lot on the northwest side of the Kraton Ngayogyakarta Hadiningrat complex.

== Building and layout ==
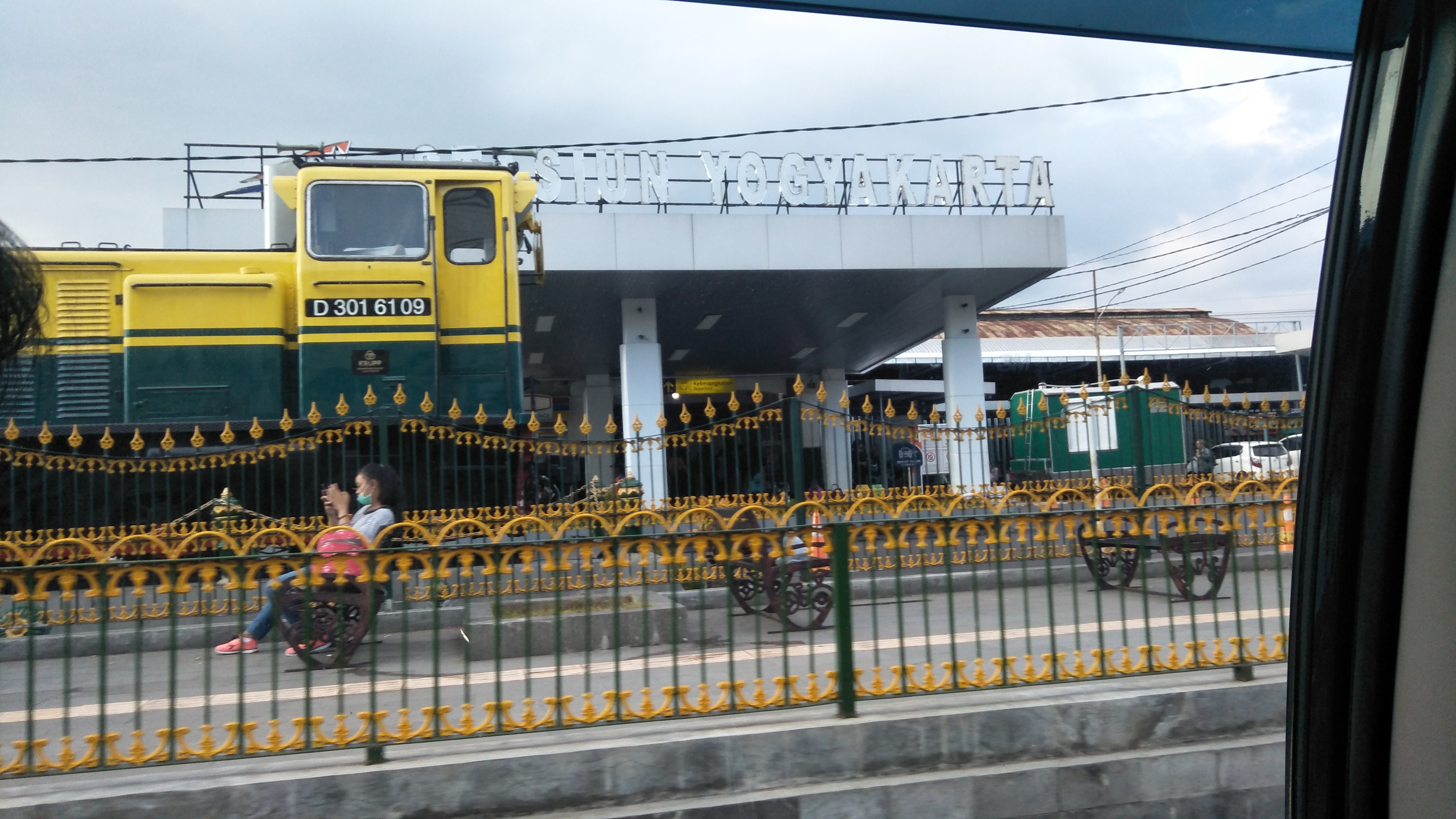
The D301 61 09 locomotive on display at the south gate of the station

Yogyakarta Station is divided into two railway yards in the north and south. It also has two gates: the main east gate facing Jalan Margo Utomo—Jalan Pangeran Mangkubumi for intercity train departures, and the south gate facing Jalan Pasar Kembang for departures and arrivals of Yogyakarta International Airport Rail Link services, local trains, KAI Commuter trains, and intercity train passengers. It also has a special building for the counter at the south gate.

In the 1970s, the number of Yogyakarta Station tracks probably reached eleven lines — not including the shunting line north of the station. The south yard has five train tracks with track 5 being a straight track and the north yard has six train tracks with (possibly) track 6 is a straight track. But in 1999, the platform on line 2 was built to accommodate the doors height of the executive train at the time.

Before the double track construction which was started around 2004, the old track 3 was a straight track towards Surakarta, while track 4 was a straight track towards Kutoarjo. During the construction until its operation on the Yogyakarta–Maguwo segment as of 8 January 2007 and then the Yogyakarta–Kutoarjo segment in November 2007 until it was inaugurated on 22 January 2008, the station layout underwent some changes: a still intact shunting track — even though it had been demolished — was changed to track 1, the old track 1 was changed to track 2, and the old track 2 was changed to track 3 as a straight track to and from Kutoarjo. In addition, a high platform was added to track 3 — overlapping the old track 3 — and track 5. Currently, track 3 is used as a straight track towards Surakarta and turning track from Kutoarjo, track 4 is used as a straight track from Kutoarjo, and track 5 is used as a straight track towards Kutoarjo.

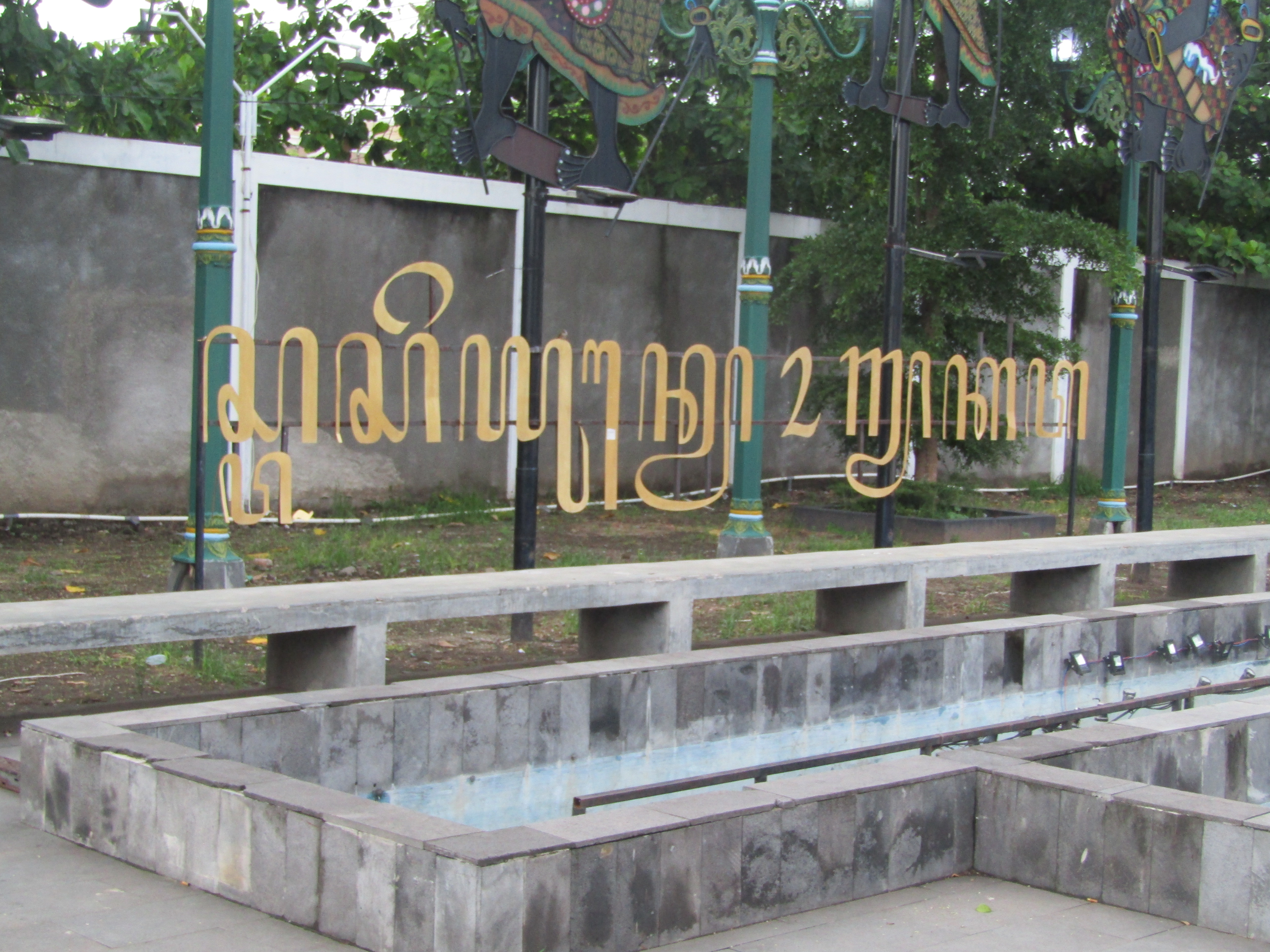
The "Yogyakarta Station" name in Javanese script

In the station area there is a locomotive depot and a train depot which are respectively located to the northwest and west. The rail turntable is to the west of the locomotive depot, which is located northwest of the station.

To the east there is a level crossing in the form of a sliding gate which is specifically for pedestrians (and, until 2023, for bicycles, rickshaws, and andong) passing around the Jalan Malioboro area. In addition, there is a bridge that spans the Code River, known as the Kewek Bridge, which crosses Jalan Abu Bakar Ali. (Note: The Kewek Bridge during the Dutch East Indies era was called Kerkweg (Church Road), because the road led to a church)

The station often undergone renovation and rearrangement, including high platform and canopy roof construction. The parking system has also undergone changes: the east and south gates are now only used for pick-up and pedicab parking, while the parking lot is located southwest of the station complex. In order to realize a large international standard train station, the station has been thoroughly renovated since the 2016 Eid al-Fitr mudik season, including remodeling the station counter at the south gate, as well as installing granite floors and repainting. To the south of the station were many crowded kiosks, freight forwarders, and kiosks selling airplane and train tickets, which were demolished in 2017 because they did not have permits and were considered as slum by the KAI.

Yogyakarta Station has an executive waiting room, Anggrek Executive Lounge, which is operated by KAI Wisata and utilizes the pavilion building behind the station.

To upgrade the train's electrical signaling system at the station, as of April 2021 a new electrical signaling system produced by Len Industri has been installed which will replace the old system produced by Siemens. This signaling has been active since September 2021. At the same time, the track between Yogyakarta and Lempuyangan stations is used as a double track railroad.

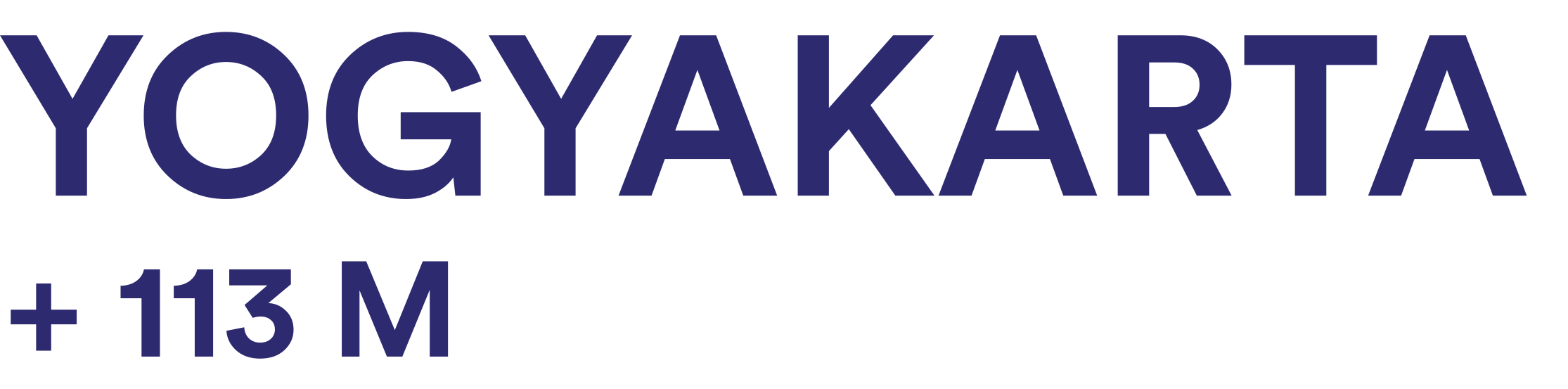
Y01 P01 YA01
North side
Line 9
Railroad from and towards the locomotive depot
Line 8
Railroad from and towards the locomotive depot
Line 7
Slender line
Line 6
Train series parking line
Island platform
Line 5
Inter-city and Central Java–Yogyakarta local train stop from the east
Straight tracks to Kutoarjo
Island platform, the doors are opened on left side of the train arrival from the east
Line 4
Inter-city and Central Java–Yogyakarta local train stop from the east
← (Wates) Prambanan Express from and towards Kutoarjo

Straight tracks from Kutoarjo

Side platform, the doors are opened on the right side of the train arrival from the west

East entrance (for inter-city train departure only)
South side
Side platform, the doors are opened on the left side of the train arrival from the west
Line 3
Inter-city and Central Java–Yogyakarta local train stop from the east
Yogyakarta Line from and towards Solo Balapan (Lempuyangan) →

Straight tracks from and towards Solo Balapan

Island platform, the doors are opened on the right side of the train arrival from the west
Line 2
← (Wates) YIA Airport Rail Link from and towards YIA
Yogyakarta Line from and towards Solo Balapan (Lempuyangan) →
Island platform, the doors are opened on the left side of the train arrival from the east
Line 1
← (Wates) YIA Airport Rail Link from and towards YIA
Side platform, the doors are opened on the right side of the train arrival from the west
G
South entrance (for KAI Commuter, local train, and airport rail link departures only)
South exit gate

== Station characteristics ==
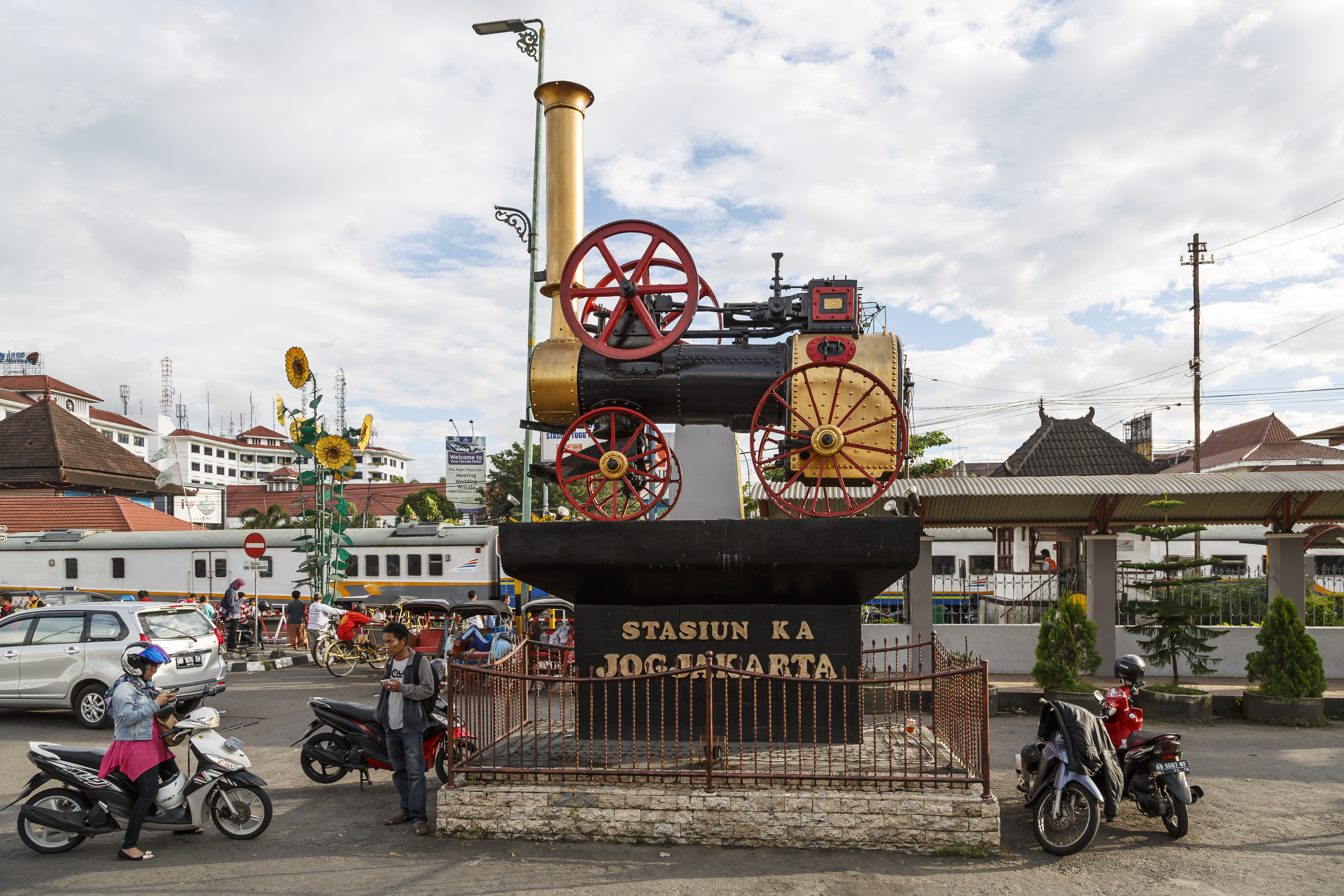
The Marshall Britannia steam monument, on Yogyakarta Station east entrance

Yogyakarta Station has two locomotive monuments on the east and south sides of the station area. The monument located at the east entrance is a portable steam engine made by Marshall Britannia, United Kingdom. Its location which was originally in the middle of the station entrance has now been moved to the north wing of the road. Meanwhile, the monument located on the south entrance is the D301 22 hydraulic diesel locomotive which has been on display since 12 December 2018. The locomotive display was carried out after all parts of the station underwent an overhaul, including adding toilets from used cars and can be used by the general public. In addition to the locomotive monument, near the east entrance, there is the words "Yogyakarta Station" in Javanese script, made in large raised letters.

The station has a train arrival song in the form of an instrumental kroncong song "Sepasang Mata Bola" by Ismail Marzuki as a train arrival bell at all major stations in the Special Region of Yogyakarta, recounting the Indonesian capital moving during the national revolution symbolized by a train from Jakarta to Yogyakarta. The song was arranged by kroncong YouTuber Purwaka Music.

== Services ==
The following is a list of train services at the Yogyakarta Station:

=== Intercity trains ===
- Argo Dwipangga, from and to Gambir and Solo Balapan (2 luxury class + 8 newgen executive class)
- Argo Lawu, from and to Gambir and Solo Balapan (2 luxury class + 8 newgen executive class)
- Argo Semeru, from and to Gambir and Surabaya Gubeng (1 compartment suites + 9 newgen executive class)
- Argo Wilis, from and to Bandung and Surabaya Gubeng (1 panoramic class + 7 stainless steel executive class)
- Bangunkarta, from and to Pasar Senen and Jombang (4 new image executive class + 5 modified premium economy class)
- Bima, from and to Gambir and Surabaya Gubeng (1 compartment suites + 9 newgen executive class)
- Bogowonto, from and to Pasar Senen and Lempuyangan (2 newgen executive class + 6 newgen economy class)
- Fajar Utama Solo, to Pasar Senen and Solo Balapan (2 newgen executive class + 6 newgen economy class)
- Fajar Utama Yogyakarta, to Pasar Senen (2 stainless steel executive class + 6 stainless steel premium economy class)
- Gajayana, from and to Gambir and Malang (1 luxury class + 8 stainless steel executive class)
- Joglosemarkerto, loopline through Central Java via Purwokerto, Semarang Tawang and Solo Balapan (4 executive class + 5 modified newgen economy class)
- Kertanegara, from and to Purwokerto and Malang (4 executive class + 4 new image economy class)
- Lodaya, from and to Bandung and Solo Balapan (4 newgen executive class + 4 newgen economy class)
- Malabar, from and to Malang and Bandung (4 stainless steel executive class + 4 stainless steel premium economy class)
- Malioboro Express, to Malang and Purwokerto (4 executive class + 4 new image premium economy class)
- Manahan, from and to Gambir and Solo Balapan (8 stainless steel executive class)
- Mutiara Selatan, from and to Bandung and Surabaya Gubeng (4 stainless steel executive class + 4 stainless steel premium economy class)
- Ranggajati, from and to Jember via Surabaya Gubeng and Cirebon (5 executive class + 4 newgen modification economy class)
- Sancaka, to Surabaya Gubeng (4 stainless steel executive class + 5 stainless steel premium economy class)
- Sancaka Utara, from and to Cilacap and Pasar Turi (4 executive class + 4 newgen modification economy class)
- Senja Utama Solo, from and to Pasar Senen and Solo Balapan (2 newgen executive class + 6 newgen economy class)
- Senja Utama Yogya, from and to Pasar Senen (2 stainless steel executive class + 6 stainless steel premium economy class)
- Taksaka, to Gambir (3 luxury class + 7 newgen executive class)
- Turangga, from and to Bandung and Surabaya Gubeng (1 panoramic class + 7 stainless steel executive class)
- Wijayakusuma, from and to Cilacap and Ketapang (5 executive class + 4 newgen modification economy class)
- Sangkuriang, from and to Bandung and Ketapang (4 stainless steel executive class + 3 stainless steel premium economy class + 1 compartment suite class)

=== Commuter rail and airport rail link ===
- Prambanan Express, to Kutoarjo
- Yogyakarta Line, to Solo Balapan and Palur
- Yogyakarta Int'l Airport Rail Link, to Yogyakarta International Airport

== Supporting transportation ==
There are a number of Trans Jogja bus stops nearby the station. Near the southern entrance is a bus stop for Corridor K2-Teman Bus. The Malioboro 1 bus stop located at Malioboro Street serves Line 1A, 2A, 3A, 8, and 10.

Type	Route	Destination
Trans Jogja	1B	Adisutjipto Airport–Yogyakarta Station (via Laksda Adisutjipto, Southern Ring Road, Sultan Agung, Panembahan Senopati, Gadjah Mada University campus)
Trans Jogja	3A	Giwangan bus terminal–Condongcatur bus terminal (via Cik Di Tiro, Jenderal Sudirman, Diponegoro, Malioboro)
Trans Jogja	3B	Giwangan bus terminal–Condongcatur bus terminal (via Diponegoro, Jenderal Sudirman, Gadjah Mada University campus, Laksda Adisutjipto, Yogyakarta–Solo)
Trans Jogja	13	Belut Godean culinary center–Ngabean bus terminal (via Diponegoro, Jlagran Lor, Letjen Suprapto)
Trans Jogja	15	Malioboro–Palbapang bus terminal
Teman Bus Yogyakarta	1A	Prambanan bus terminal–Yogyakarta Station (via Laksda Adisutjipto, Urip Soemohardjo, Jenderal Sudirman, Malioboro)
Teman Bus Yogyakarta	2A	Condongcatur bus terminal–XT Square (via Jombor, Pajajaran, Nyi Tjondrolukito, Margo Utomo, Malioboro, Panembahan Senopati, Brigjen Katamso)

== In popular culture ==
- The "Sepasang Mata Bola" song by Ismail Marzuki illustrates the atmosphere of the evening arrival at Yogyakarta Station.
- Yogyakarta Station is one of the filming locations for the films Kereta Api Terakhir (early and last scenes), Daun di Atas Bantal (main setting), and Janur Kuning (during the attack on Toegoe Hotel).
- Yogyakarta Station was used as one of the locations where the Yogyakarta-based rock band, Sheila on 7, took a music video for a song "Tunggu Aku di Jakarta" in 2000 and a singer from Yogyakarta who was the runner-up of the 2010 Indonesian Idol, Citra Scholastika, in her song "Pasti Bisa" in 2012.
- Yogyakarta Station became a source of inspiration for Dimas Tedjo "Blangkon" in creating a campursari song "Stasiun Tugu".
- Yogyakarta Station is also mentioned in the Kisah Tanah Jawa book written by the mystery content creator team, Kisah Tanah Jawa.

== Incidents ==
- On 14 November 2003, three passenger trains with two business class and one executive class cars crashed at the Yogyakarta Locomotive Depot. This incident started when the train set was about to be washed before being sent to Jakarta. However, the switch moves on its own when the train series is shunted, causing it to fall.
- On 23 April 2014, a man was killed by a cement train with travel number 8067 Lempuyangan-Purwokerto relation. The victim is suspected of having a mental disorder. This incident occurred to the north of the Abu Bakar Ali Parking Park.
- On 4 July 2017, a vocational high school student disappeared after getting off the Senja Utama Yogya train at Tugu Station. Two days later, at 3.00 pm, the family received a call from the escort that the student had been taken home.
- On 18 September 2022, a short video recording the incident when one of the passengers on the Bangunkarta train, the Jombang–Pasar Senen relation, fell and was hit by a train, because he was left behind by the train, and forced his way in when the train door was closed. The train was in a condition to leave Yogyakarta Tugu Station. The passenger suffered an injury to his right leg and immediately received treatment.
- On 12 March 2025, 3 passenger carriages in the pocket rails just outside of the station caught fire and burned the interior, also destroying the windows. It took firefighters an hour to extinguish the flames. The police blamed arson and an alleged 17-year-old perpetrator by the initial M, who is a Jakartan. The police believed that the perpetrator had burned a sheet of paper and placed it on one of the chairs, causing it to spread. No casualties or injuries were reported from the incident.

== Gallery ==
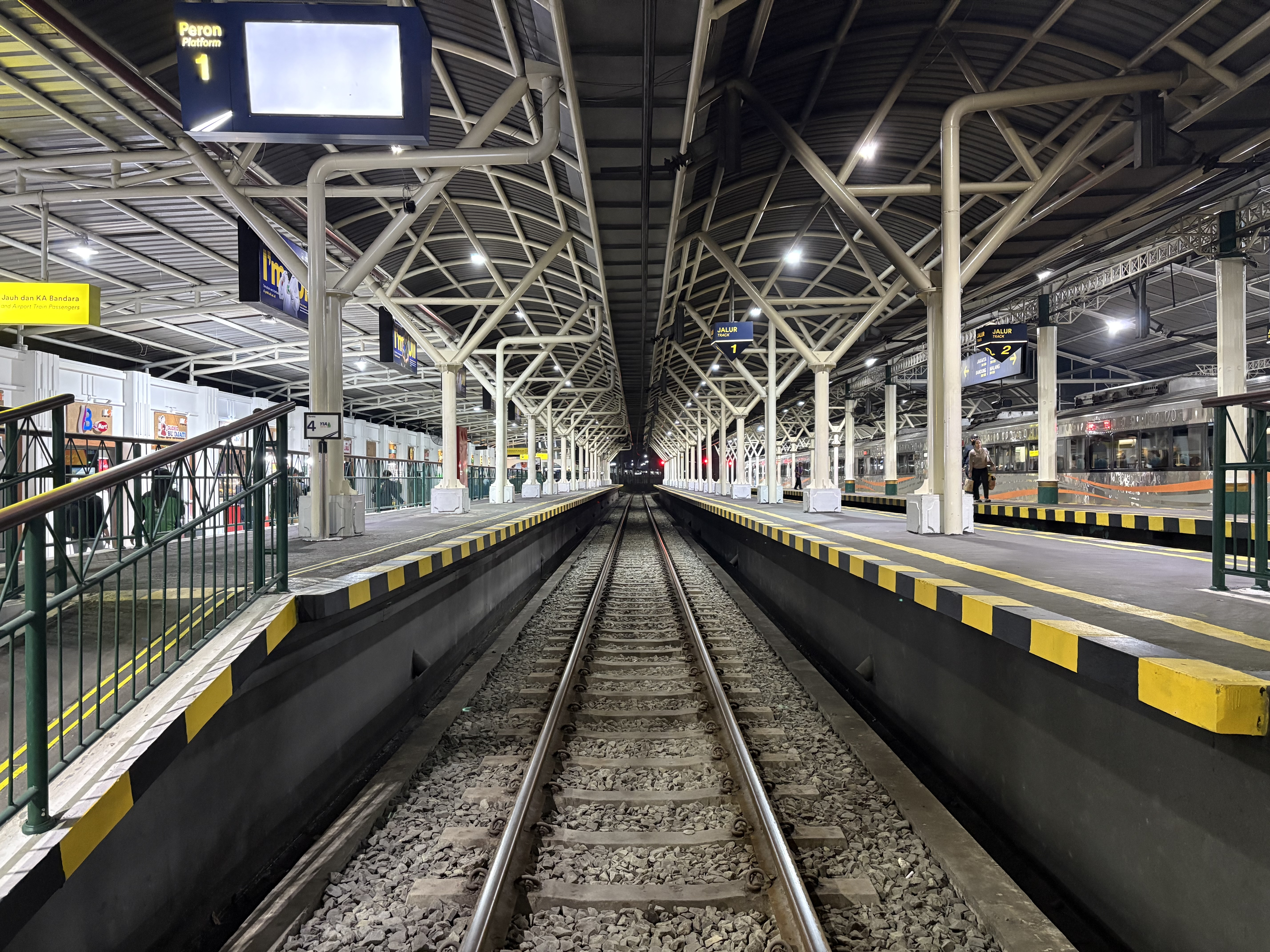
Tracks and platforms of the station at night

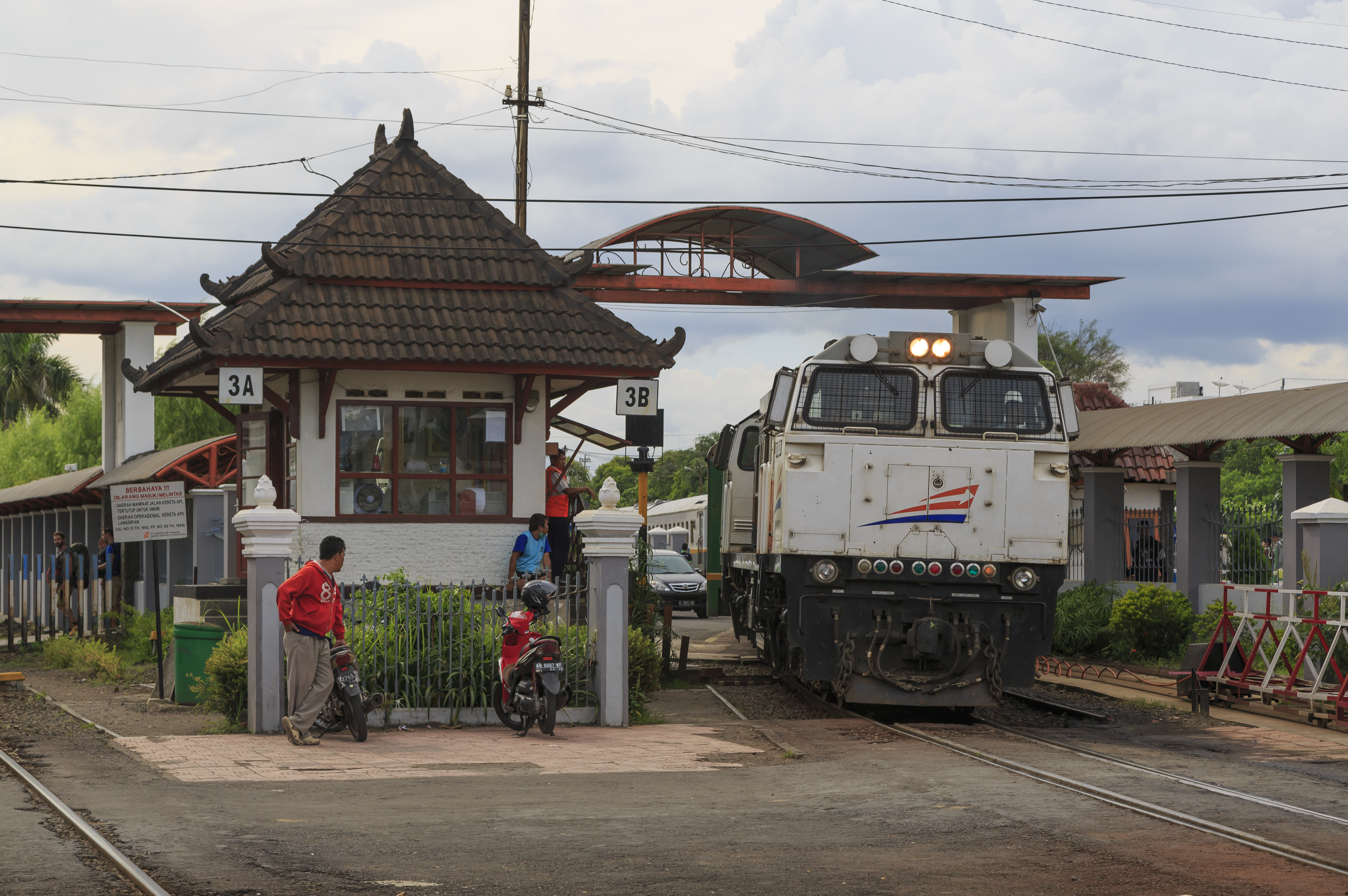
A train arriving at Yogyakarta Station

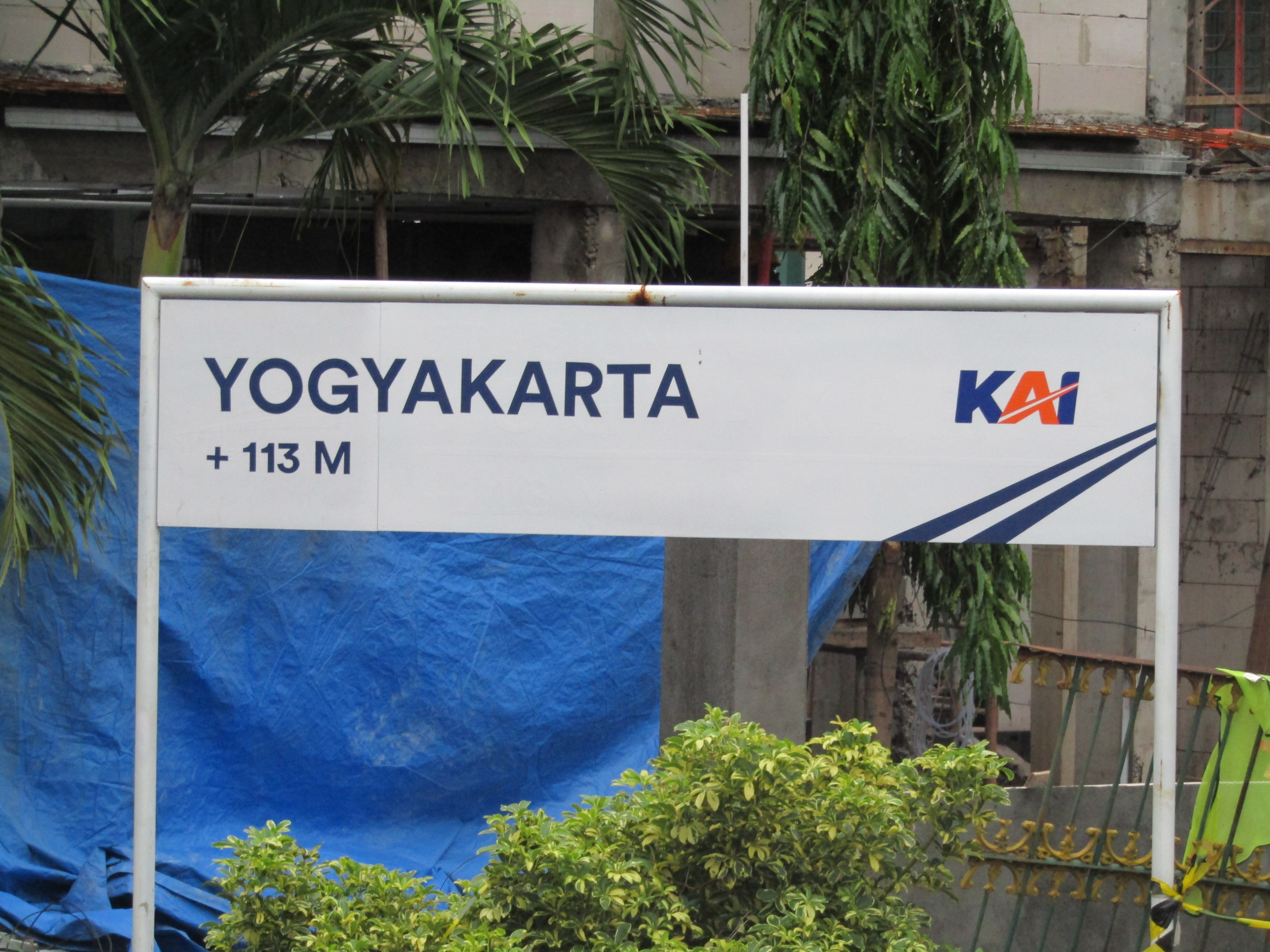
The station signage of the as of December 2020

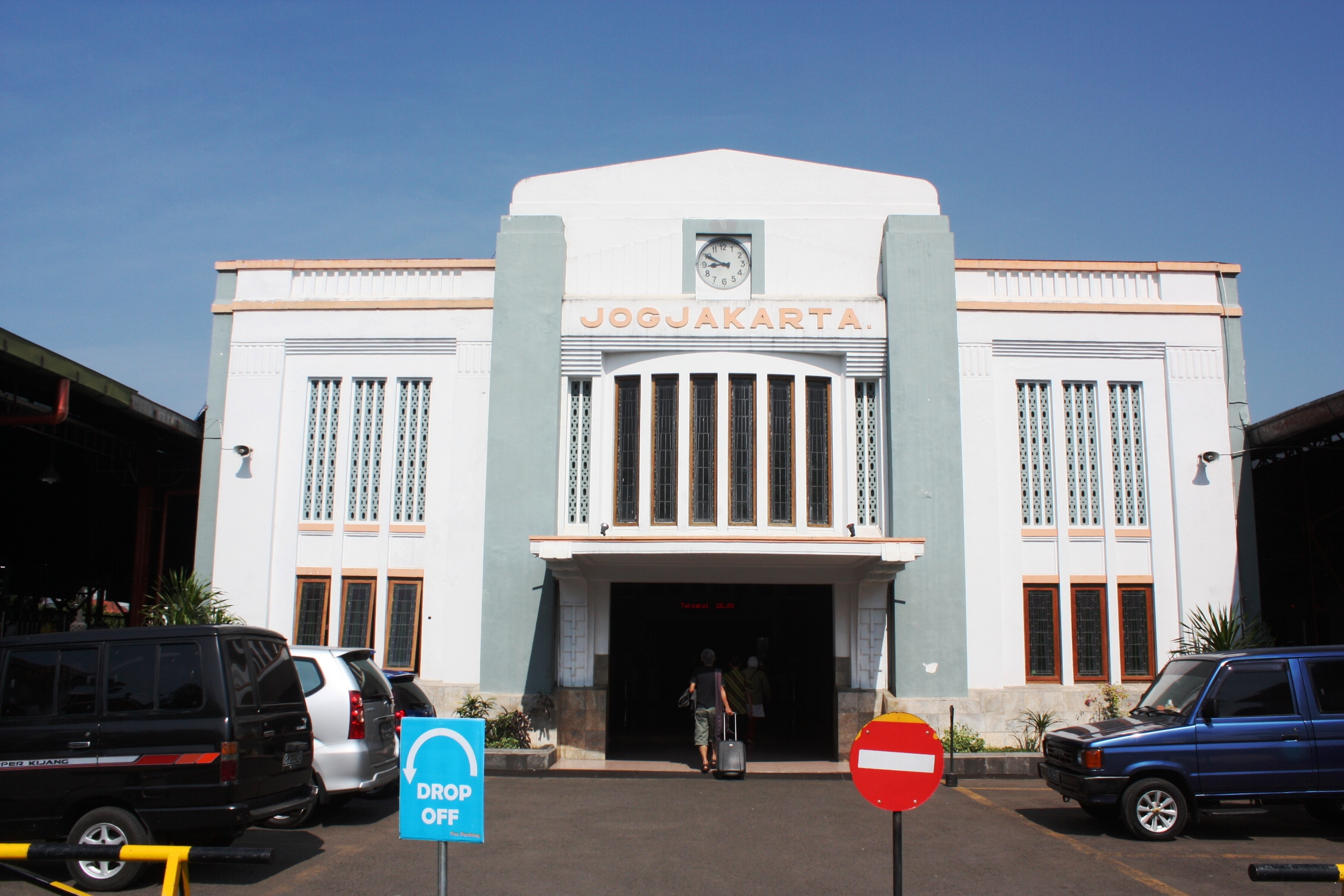
The station front view after being repainted with KAI's new coloring style (2011).

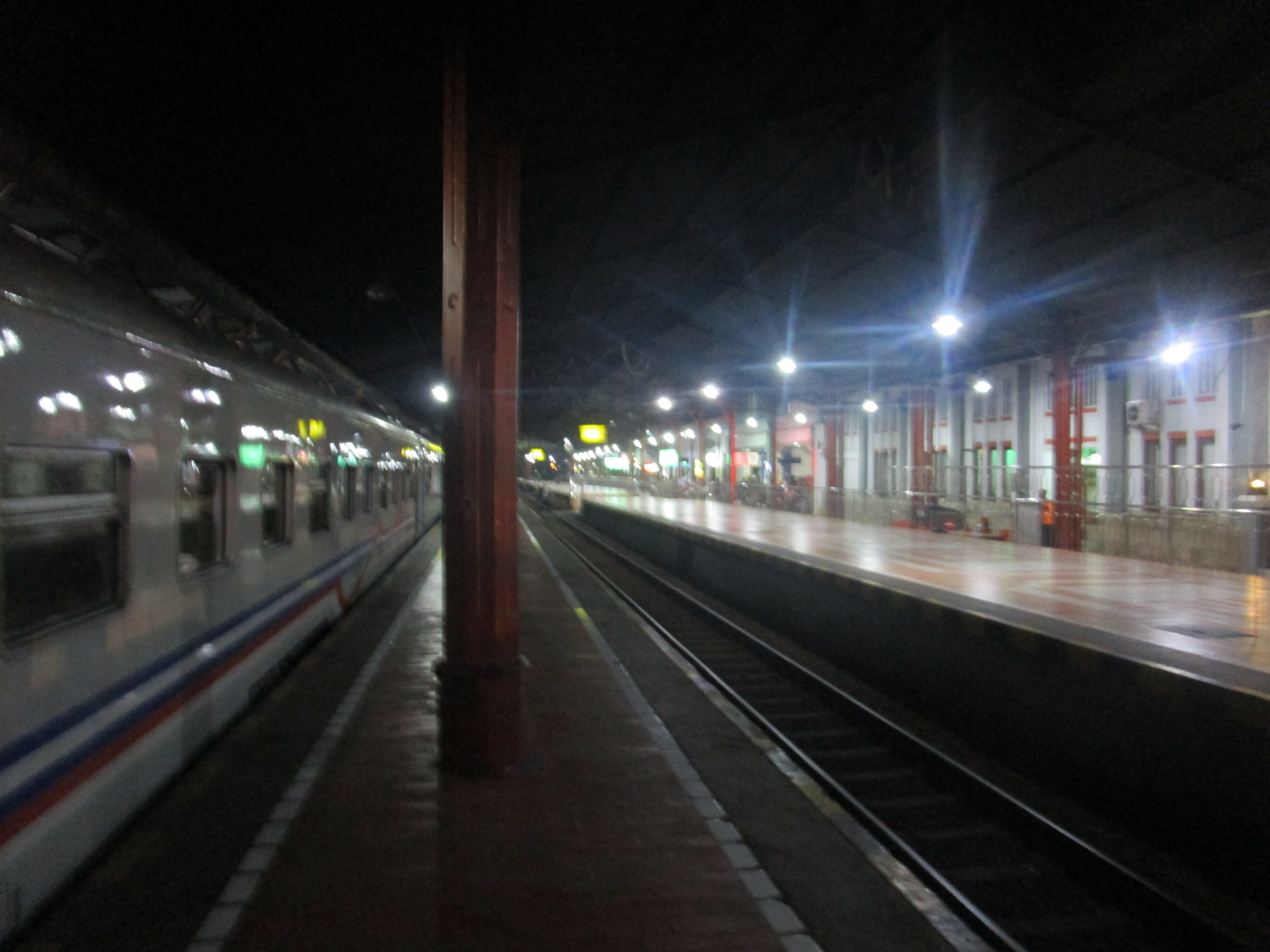
The station south platform

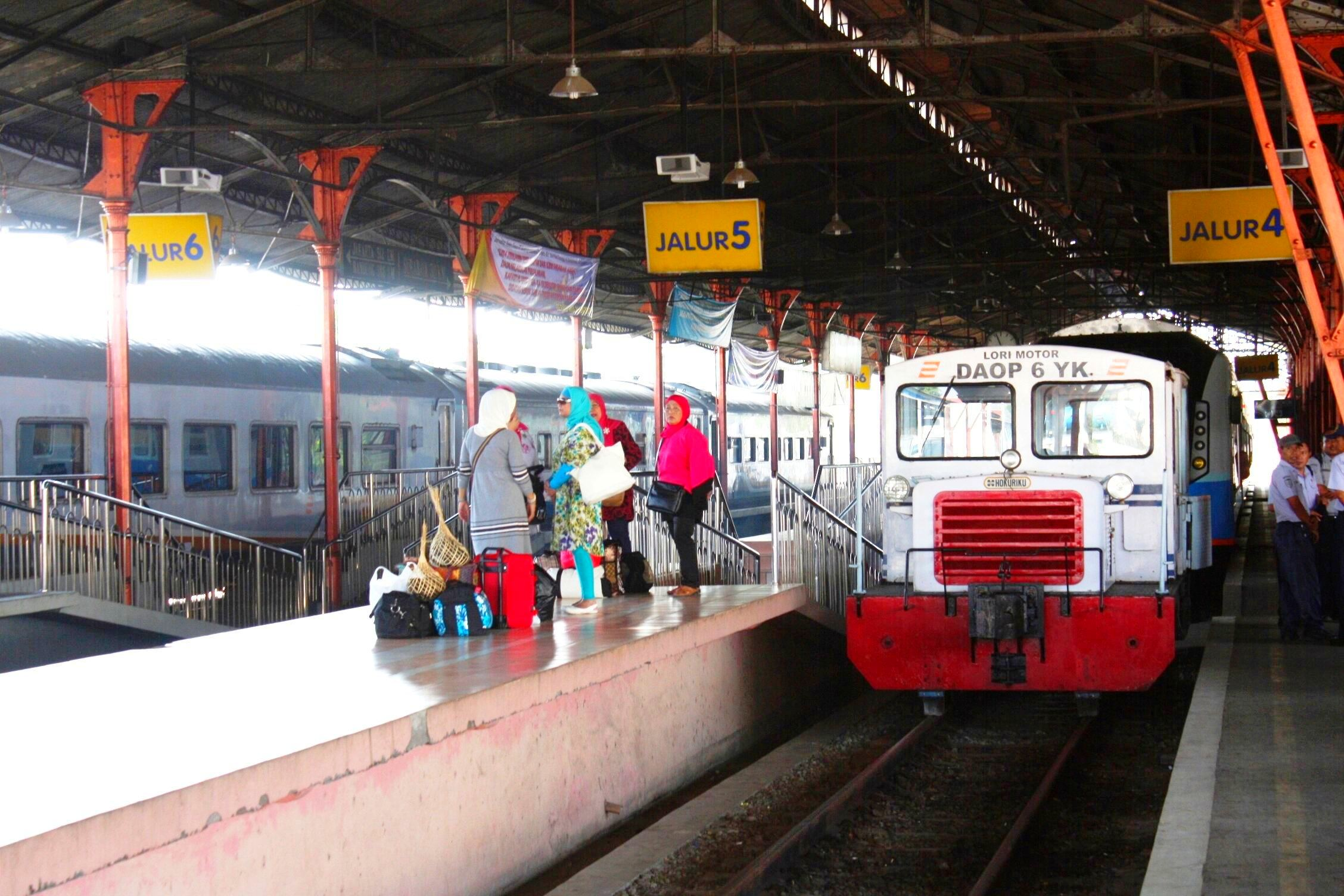
The station north platform

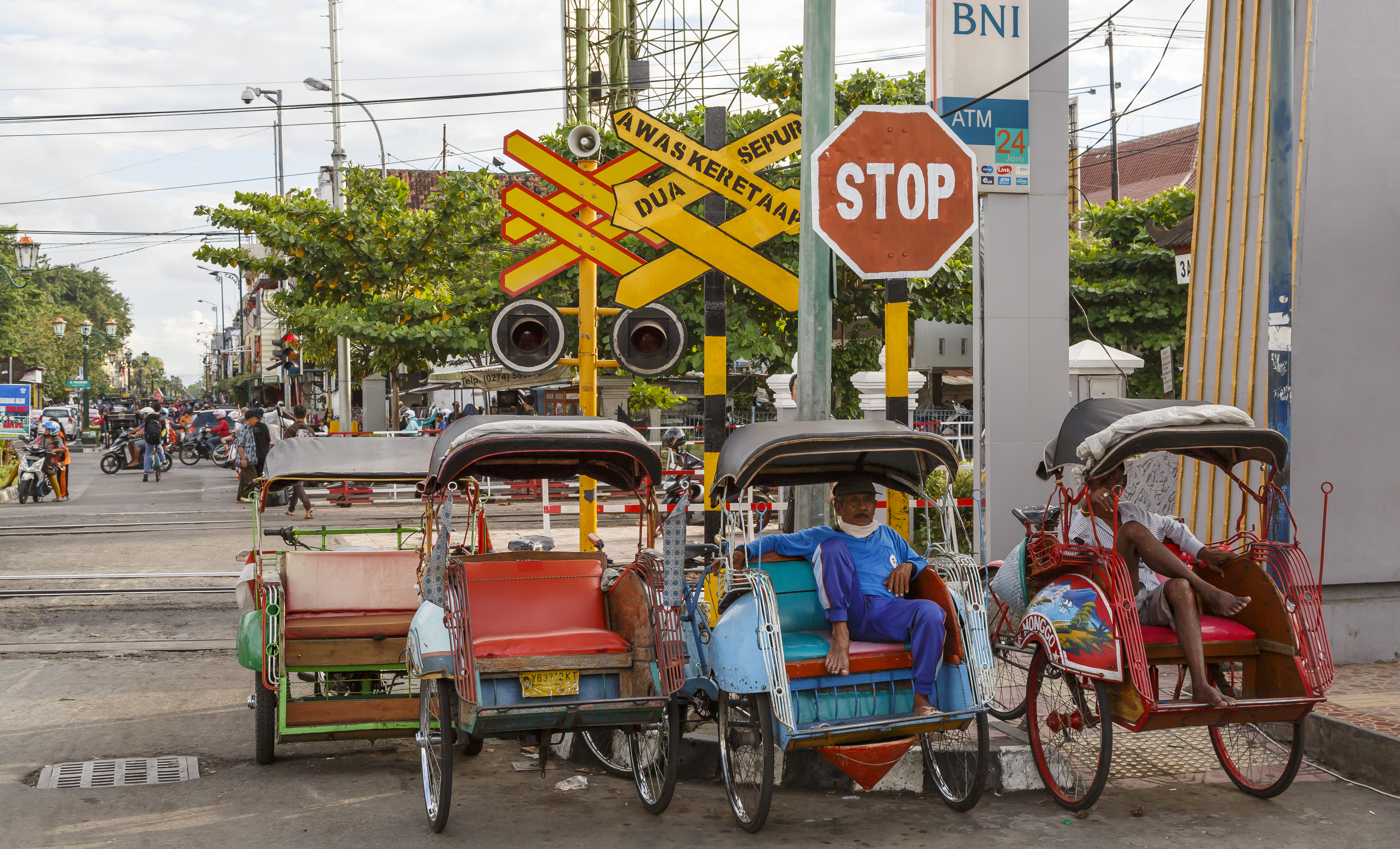
Rickshaws waiting for passengers near the station

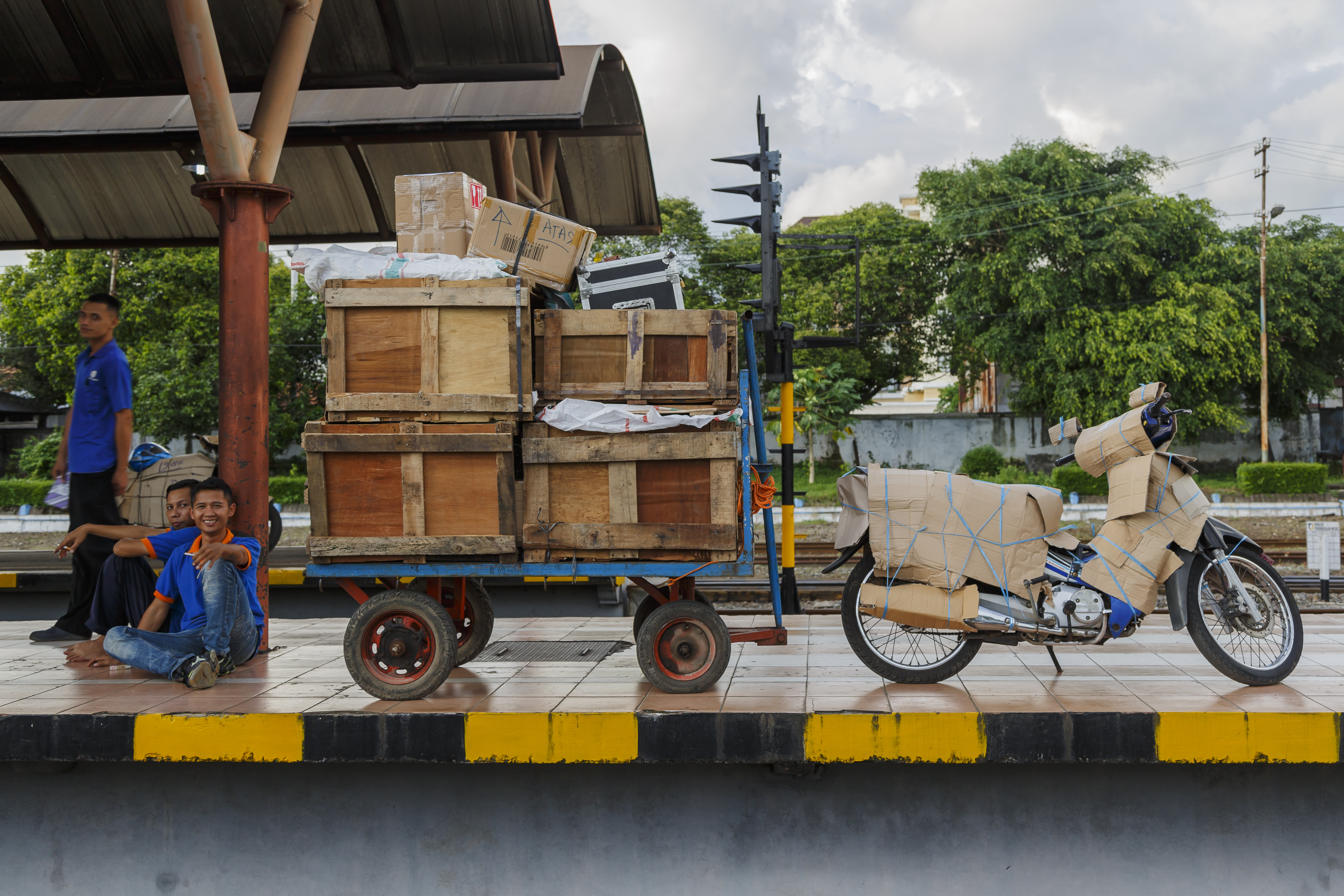
A number of transport workers waiting to load cargo and motorcycles with carts

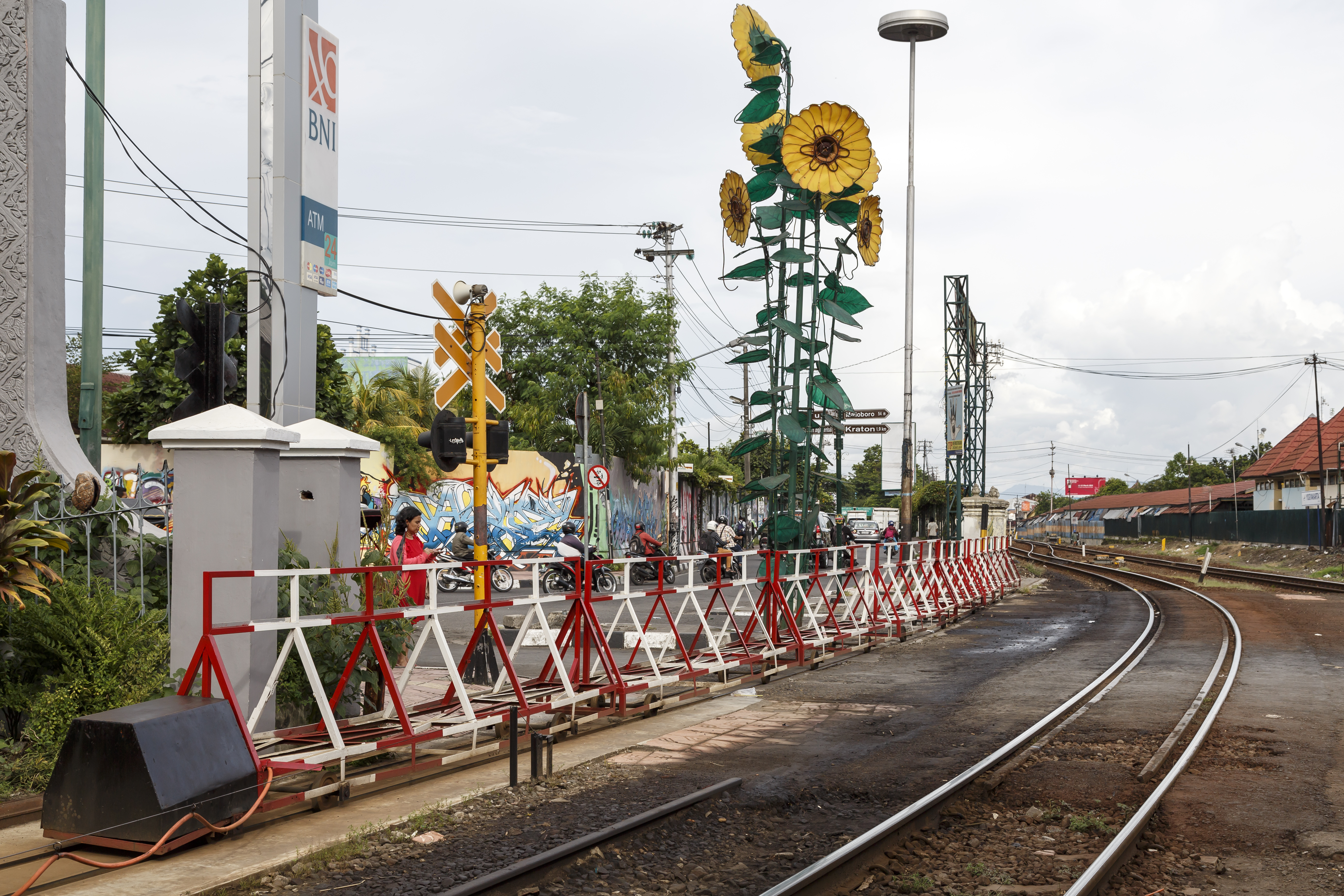
A sliding gate level crossing, now only intended for pedestrians

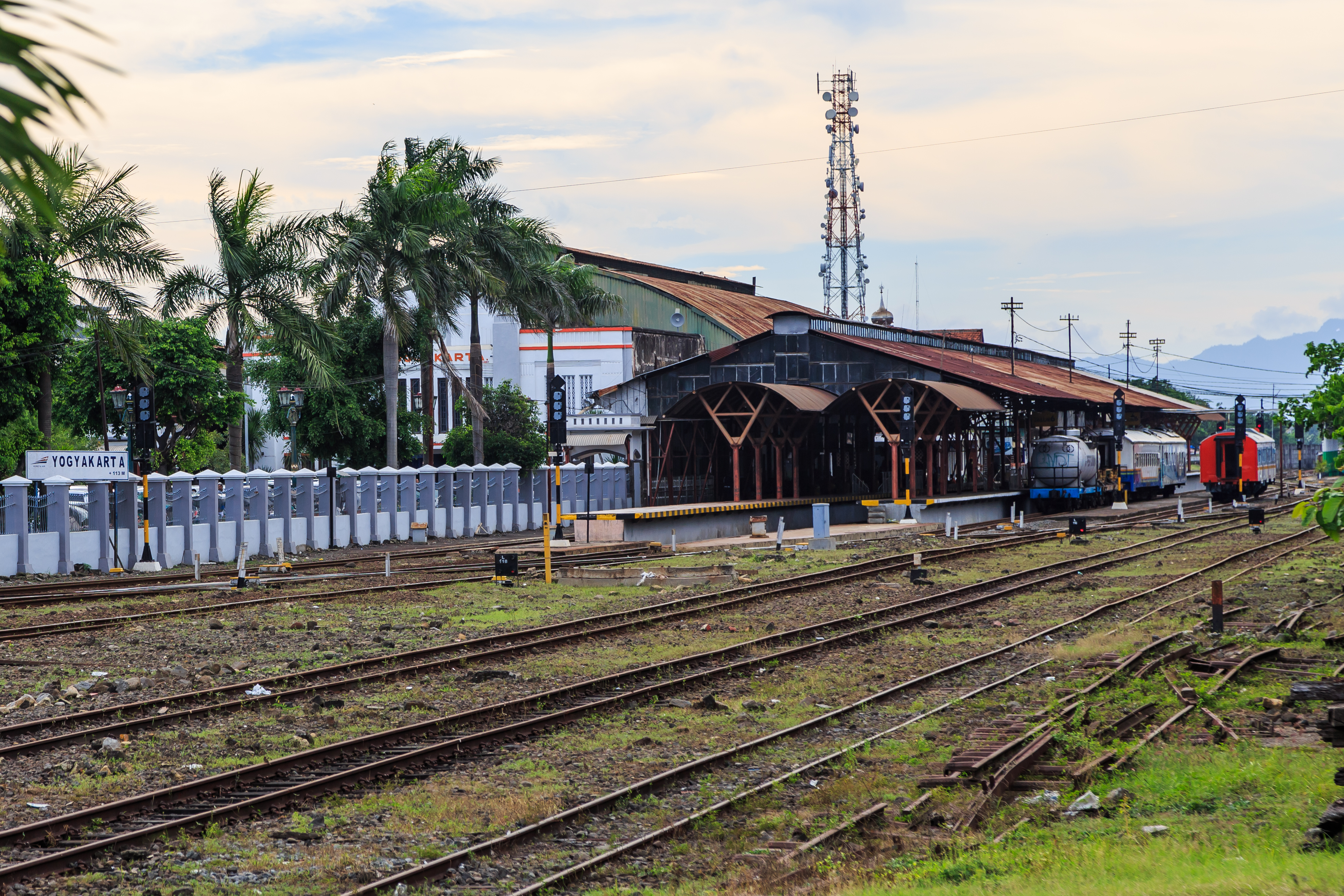
The station north yard

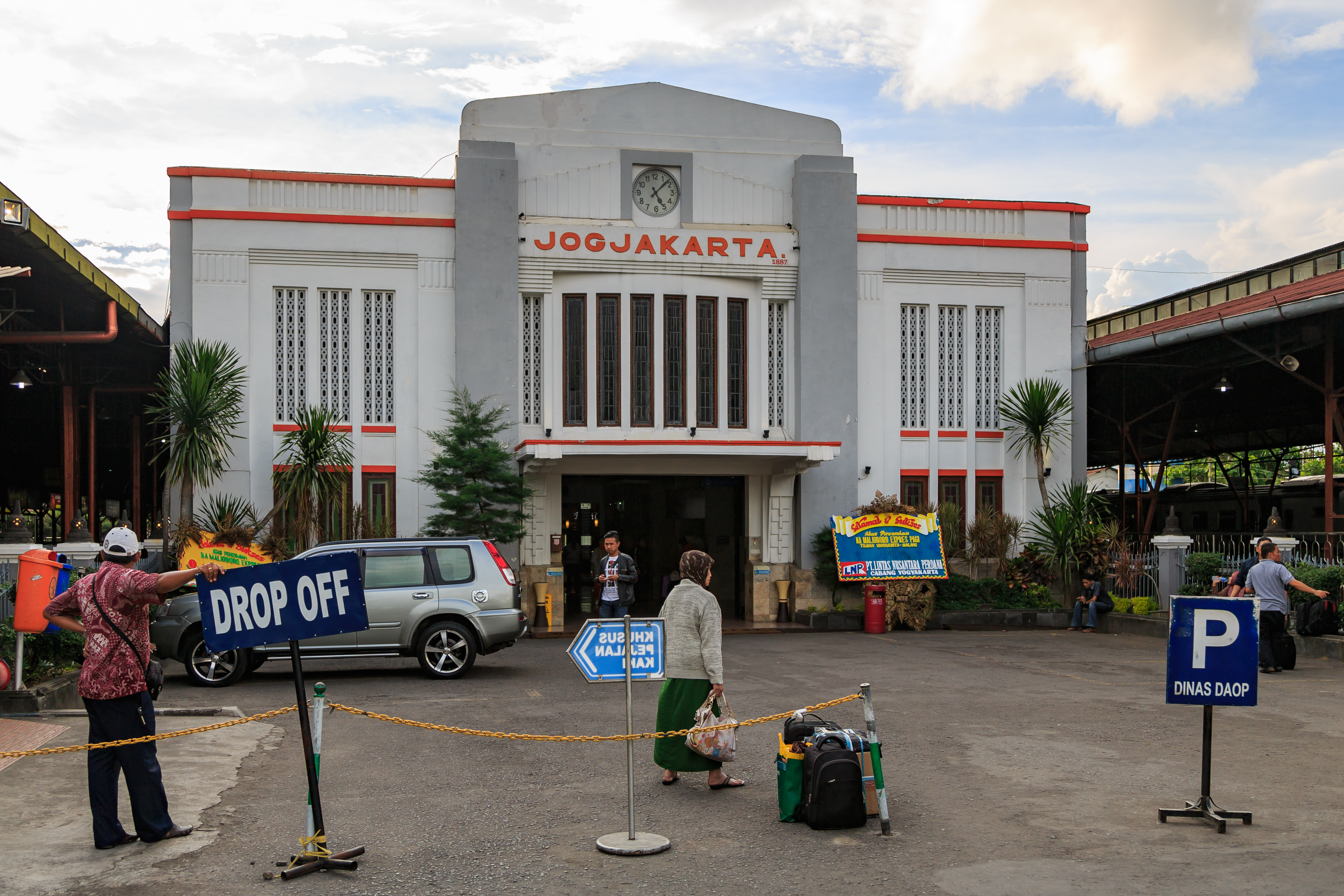
The station front facade prior to repainting (2015)

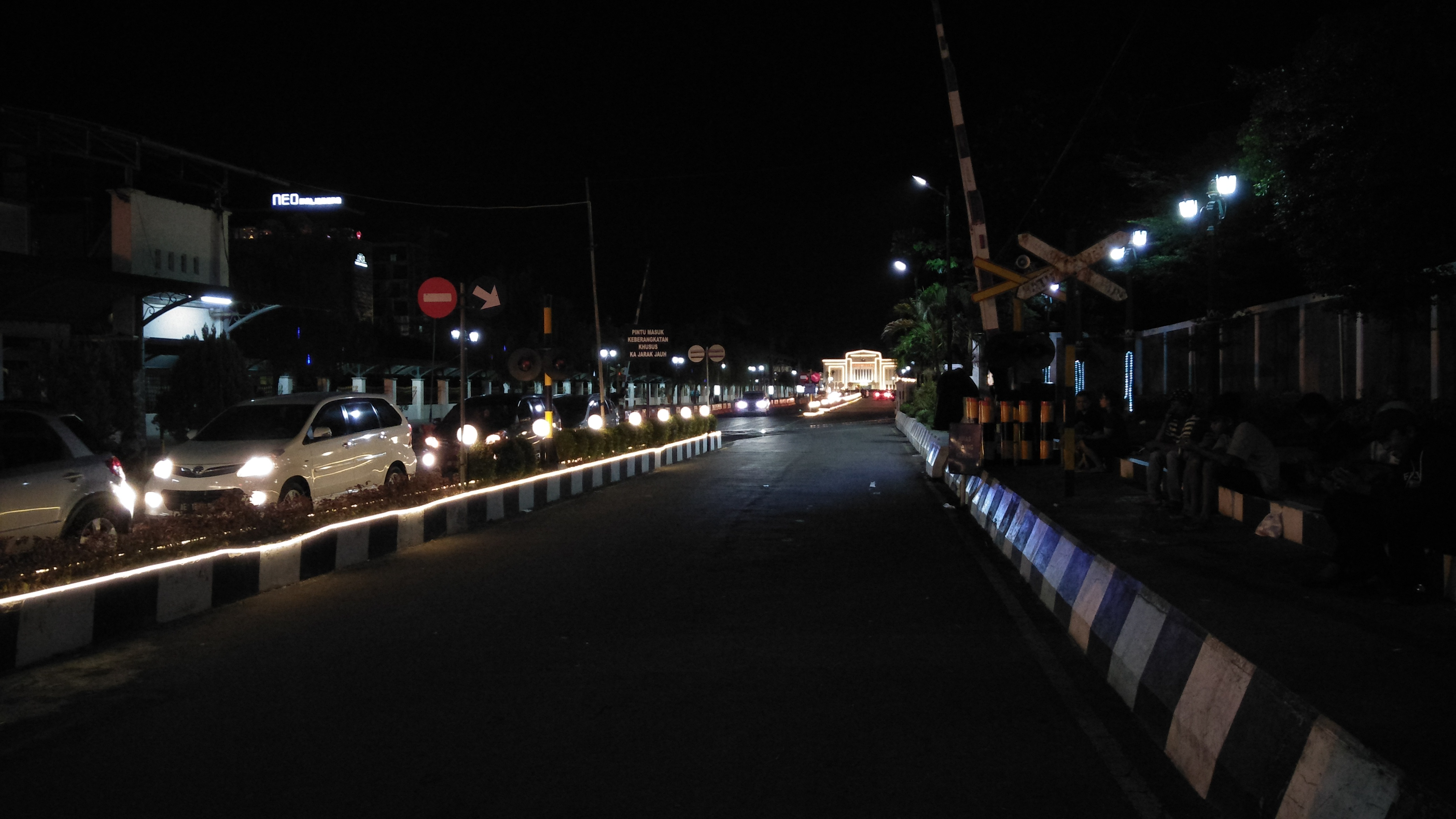
The station entrance at night

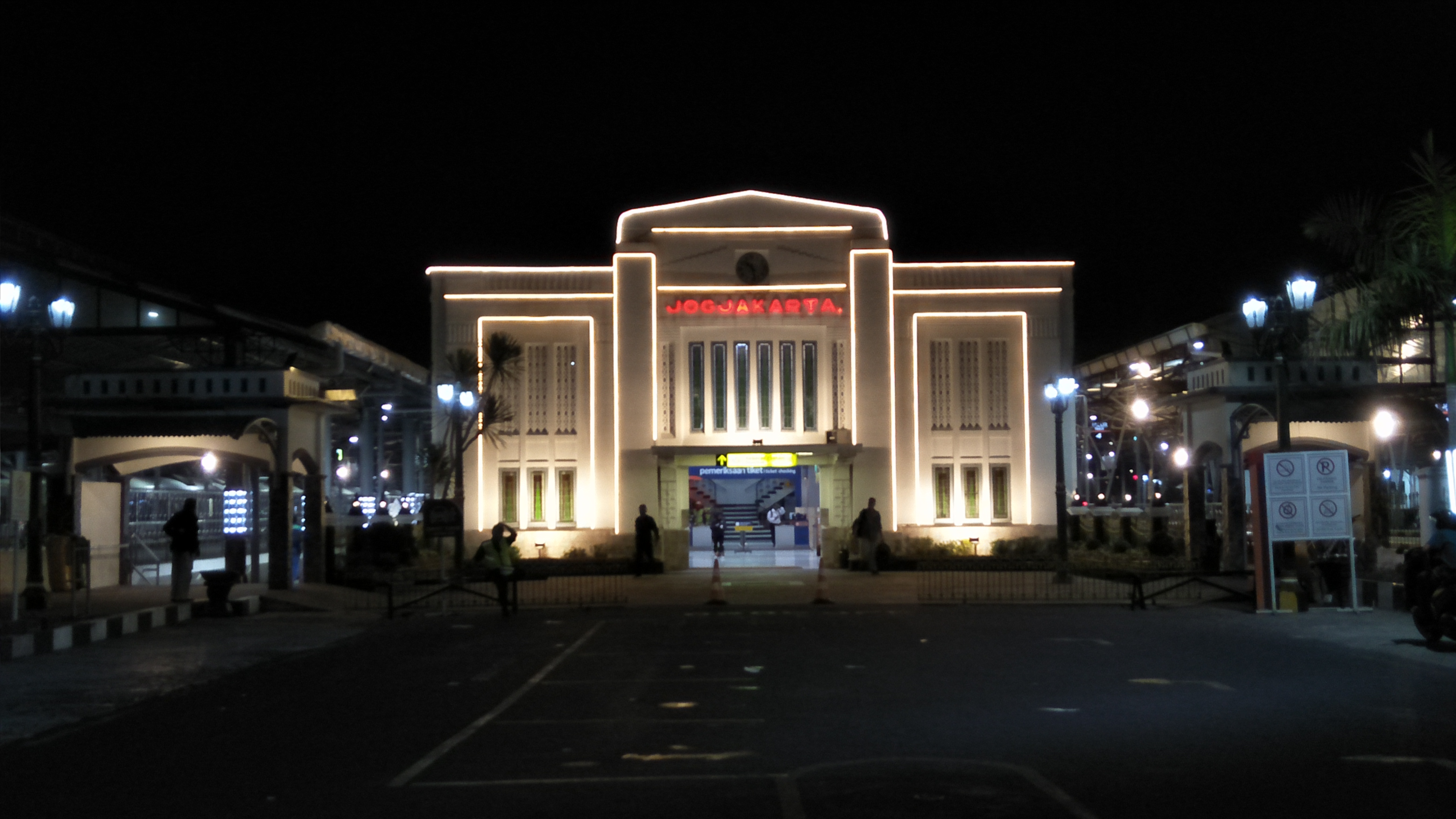
The station front facade at night

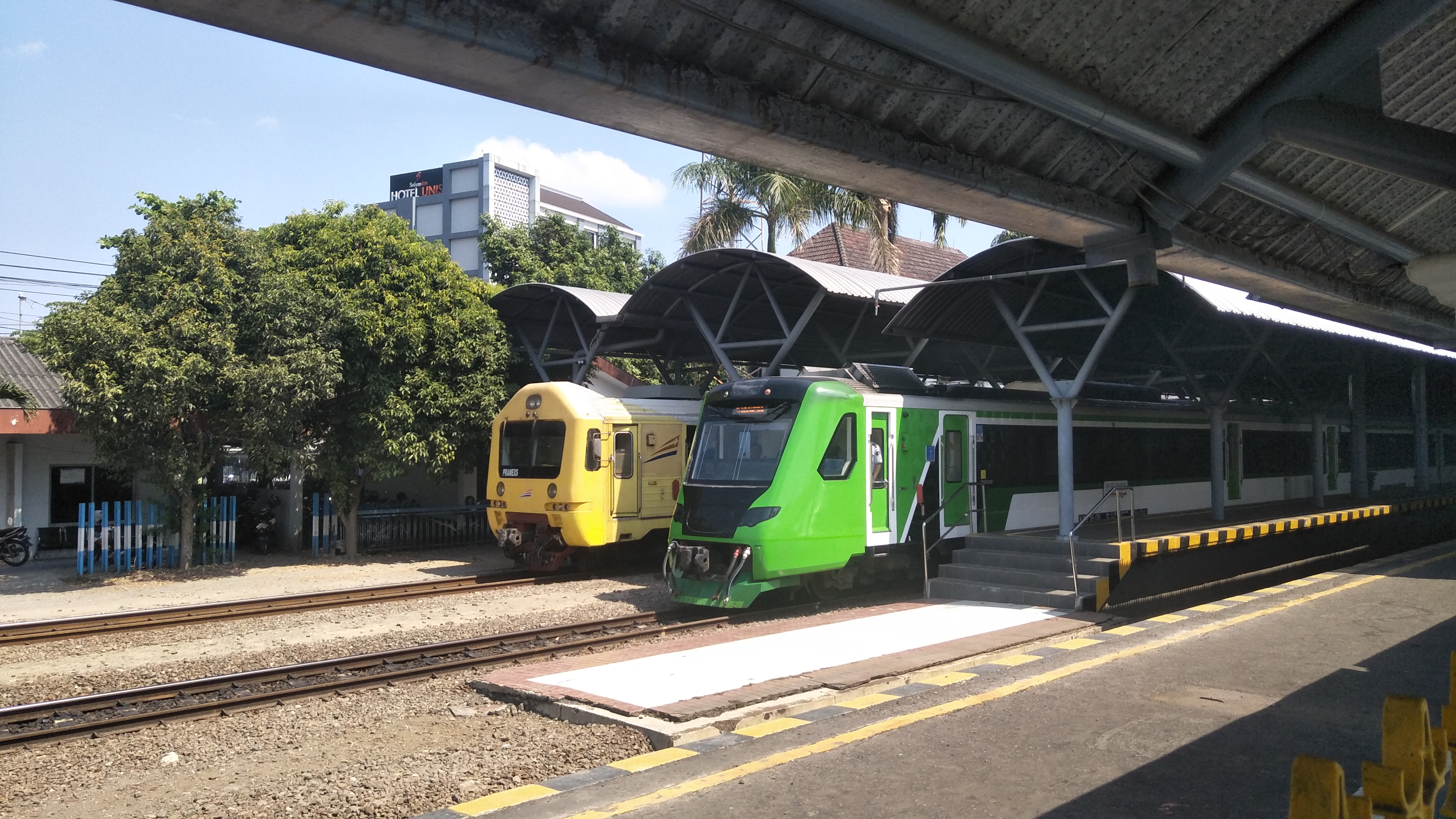
Prambanan Express and Solo Express trains at the station platform

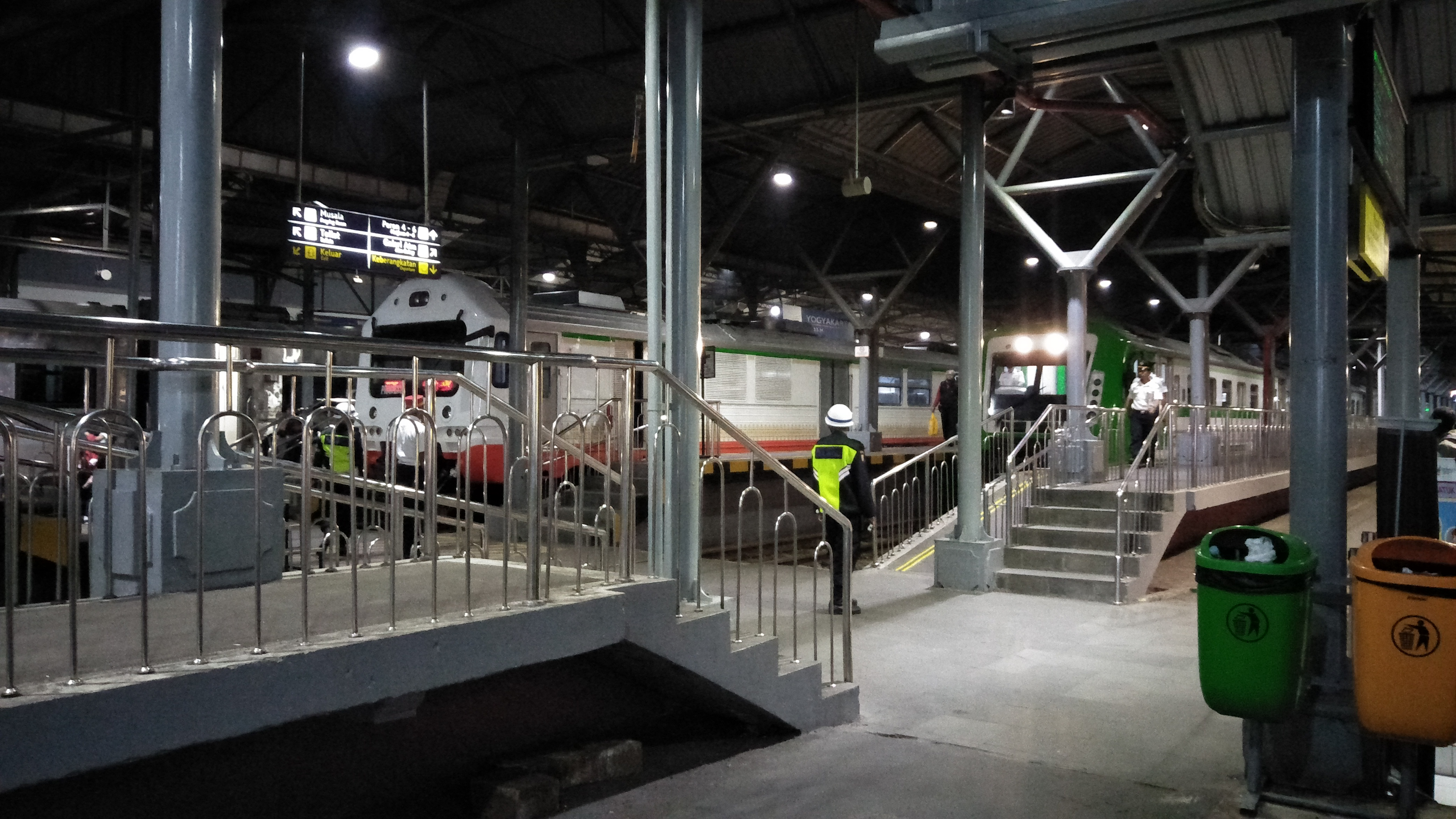
Prambanan Express train with new style pattern (left) and the YIA Airport Rail Link (right) at the station platform

== Cited works ==
- Esha, Teguh (2005). Ismail Marzuki: musik, tanah air, dan cinta (1st ed.). Jakarta: LP3ES. ISBN 979-3330-36-8. OCLC 74913436.
