= Kewek railway bridge =

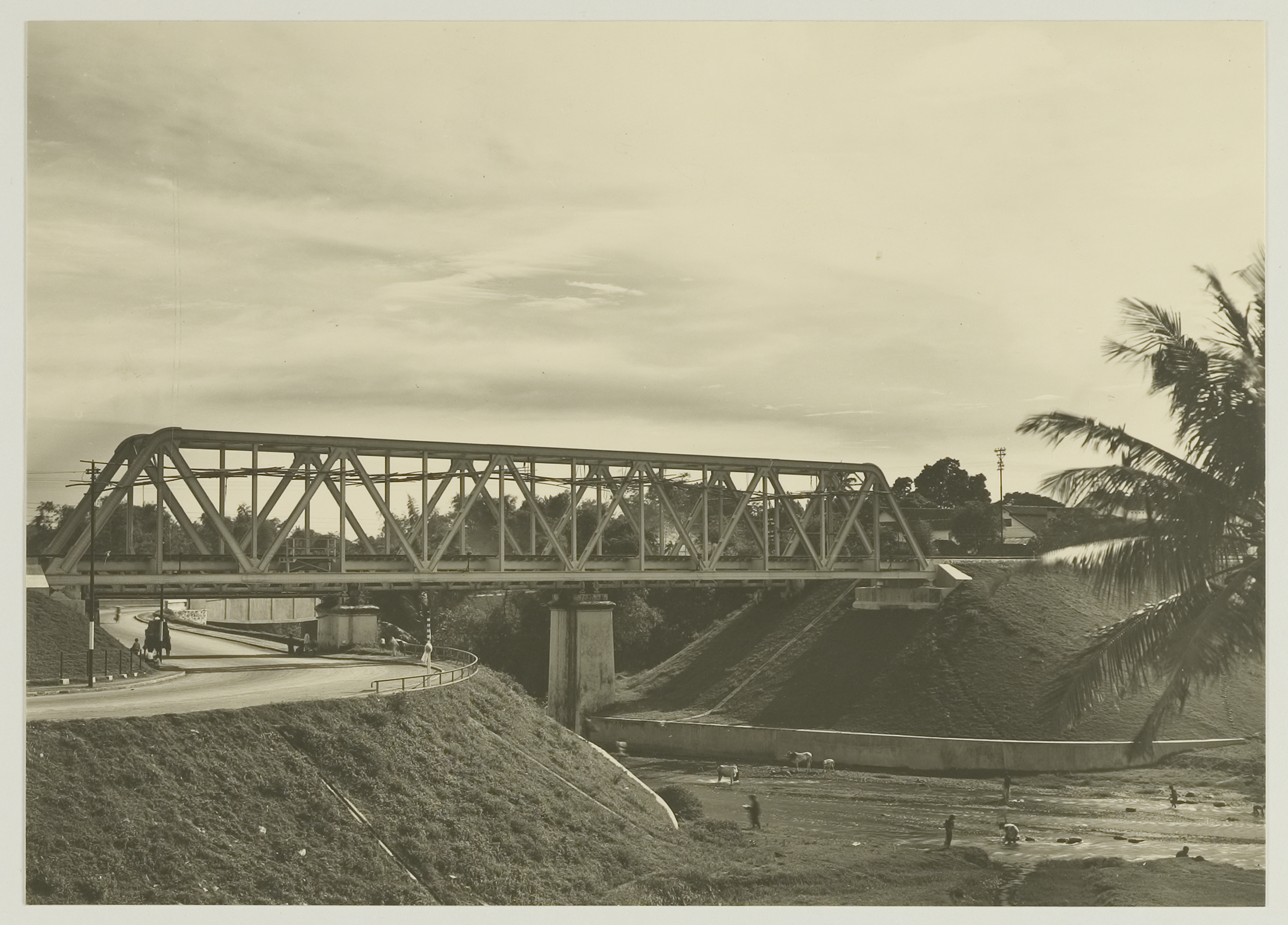
- Kewek railway bridge in 1937
- Coordinates: 7°47′28″S 110°22′08″E
- Crosses: Yogyakarta - Solo Balapan railway line
- Locale: Yogyakarta, Special Region of Yogyakarta
- Begins: Yogyakarta
- Ends: Lempuyangan

Characteristics
- Total length: 17,80 meters
- Height: 5 meters

Rail characteristics
- Track gauge: 1067 mm

History
- Built: 1921
- Opened: 1924

Location
- Interactive map of Kewek railway bridge

Kewek railway bridge (Javanese: ꧋ꦏꦿꦺꦠꦺꦒ꧀ꦏꦺꦮꦺꦏ꧀, translit. Krètèg Kèwèk, also known as the Gresik railway bridge) is an railway bridge that linked between Yogyakarta & Solo Balapan that located in Yogyakarta that crossing the Code River.

== Etymology ==
The name "Kewek" actually comes from the Dutch, "Kerk Weg," which means "the road leading to the church" (in this case, the Church of Saint Antonius, Kotabaru). However, because the local people have difficulty pronouncing Dutch, it is called "Kewek."

== History ==
The Kewek railway bridge's existence is closely tied to the development of the Kotabaru, Gondokusuman, Yogyakarta area in the 1920s. The Dutch government built a road crossing the Code River from Kotabaru to Malioboro in 1921, as the Gondolayu Bridge was the only access to Malioboro at the time, providing a longer route. In 1924, the Kewek railway bridge officially opened by the government.

Long before the Kewek railway bridge was built, there was a railway bridge built by the Staatsspoorwegen (SS) and the Nederlandsch-Indische Spoorweg Maatschappij (NIS) in 1872, also known as the Kleringan Bridge. The road was constructed under the existing railway bridge with a viaduct structure, then turned west until it reached Malioboro. The viaduct was built to prevent the buildup of vehicles due to the railway crossing, considering that the Kotabaru area and its surroundings were already quite dense at that time.

After the Independence of Indonesia, the name of the road "Kerk Weg" was changed to Jalan Abu Bakar Ali, but the term "kewek" for this bridge still sticks with the community to present.

In the early 2000s, the Yogyakarta government created a new lane on the west side of the Kewek railway bridge to ease traffic congestion from Malioboro to Kotabaru. Traffic flow was then made two-way. Then in 2011, a new bridge was built on the north side, which also aimed to ease traffic congestion. Construction of the new bridge was completed in New Year 2012, and was inaugurated by Sultan Hamengkubuwono X on 3 January 2012, under the name "Amarta Bridge."

== Technical data ==
The Kewek railway bridge has a girder construction, measuring 17.80 m long and 11.90 m wide. It divides three districts in Yogyakarta.

Measuring 72 meters in length, this bridge is part of the Kutoarjo railway station–Purwosari–Solo Balapan railway line, located between Yogyakarta and Lempuyangan.

== Kewek railway bridge present ==
Currently, only the NIS bridge remains. The SS bridge was dismantled during the Japanese occupation of Indonesia, leaving only the pylons on the east side. The NIS bridge has undergone several renovations and maintenance projects, the last major work being carried out in 2011, when the double-tracking of the Yogyakarta–Solo Balapan line was completed.

The rail line that crosses the Kleringan bridge was also electrified in 2020, as a supporting facility KAI Commuter Yogyakarta Line that released in 2021.

== Service ==
Here's train that crossing the Kewek railway bridge:

=== Executive class ===
- Argo Dwipangga, between Gambir and Solo Balapan
- Argo Lawu, between Gambir and Solo Balapan
- Argo Wilis, between Bandung and Surabaya Gubeng
- Argo Semeru, between Gambir and Surabaya Gubeng
- Bima, between Gambir and Surabaya Gubeng
- Manahan, between Gambir and Solo Balapan
- Gajayana, between Gambir and Malang
- Turangga, between Bandung and Surabaya Gubeng

=== Mixed class ===
- Fajar and Senja Utama Solo, between Pasar Senen and Solo Balapan (executive class and premium economy class)
- Lodaya, between Bandung and Solo Balapan (executive class and premium economy class)
- Sancaka, between Yogyakarta & Surabaya Gubeng (executive class and premium economy class)
- Bangunkarta, between Pasar Senen and Jombang (executive class and economy plus class)
- Malabar, between Bandung and Malang (executive class, business class, and economy plus class)
- Mutiara Selatan, between Bandung and Surabaya Gubeng (executive class and premium economy class)
- Kertanegara, between Purwokerto and Malang (executive class and economy plus class)
- Malioboro Express, between Yogyakarta and Malang (executive class and economy plus class)
- Ranggajati, between Cirebon via Yogyakarta-Purwokerto and Jember via Madiun-Jombang-Surabaya Gubeng (executive class and business class)
- Wijayakusuma, between Cilacap and Ketapang (executive class and premium economy class)
- Sancaka Utara, between Surabaya Pasar Turi and Cilacap (executive class and business class)
- Batavia train, between Gambir & Solo Balapan (executive and economy)
- Mataram, between Pasar Senen and Solo Balapan
- Gaya Baru Malam Selatan, Pasar Senen and Surabaya Gubeng
- Singasari, Pasar Senen and Blitar

=== Economy class ===
- Jayakarta, between Pasar Senen and Surabaya Gubeng
- Joglosemarkerto, loop line through Central Java and the Special Region of Yogyakarta via Purwokerto
- Logawa, between Purwokerto and Ketapang
- Progo, between Pasar Senen and Lempuyangan
- Bengawan, between Pasar Senen and Purwosari
- Jaka Tingkir, between Pasar Senen and Purwosari
- Kahuripan, between Kiaracondong and Blitar
- Pasundan, between Kiaracondong and Surabaya Gubeng
- Gajahwong, between Pasar Senen and Purwosari

=== Freight ===
- Overnight train Service, between Kampung Bandan and Malang (Central Parcel), between Surabaya Kota and Bandung (Southern Parcel)

=== Commuter line ===
- KAI Commuter Yogyakarta Line, between Yogyakarta and Palur
