= Fajar and Senja Utama Solo =

Passenger trains in Indonesia

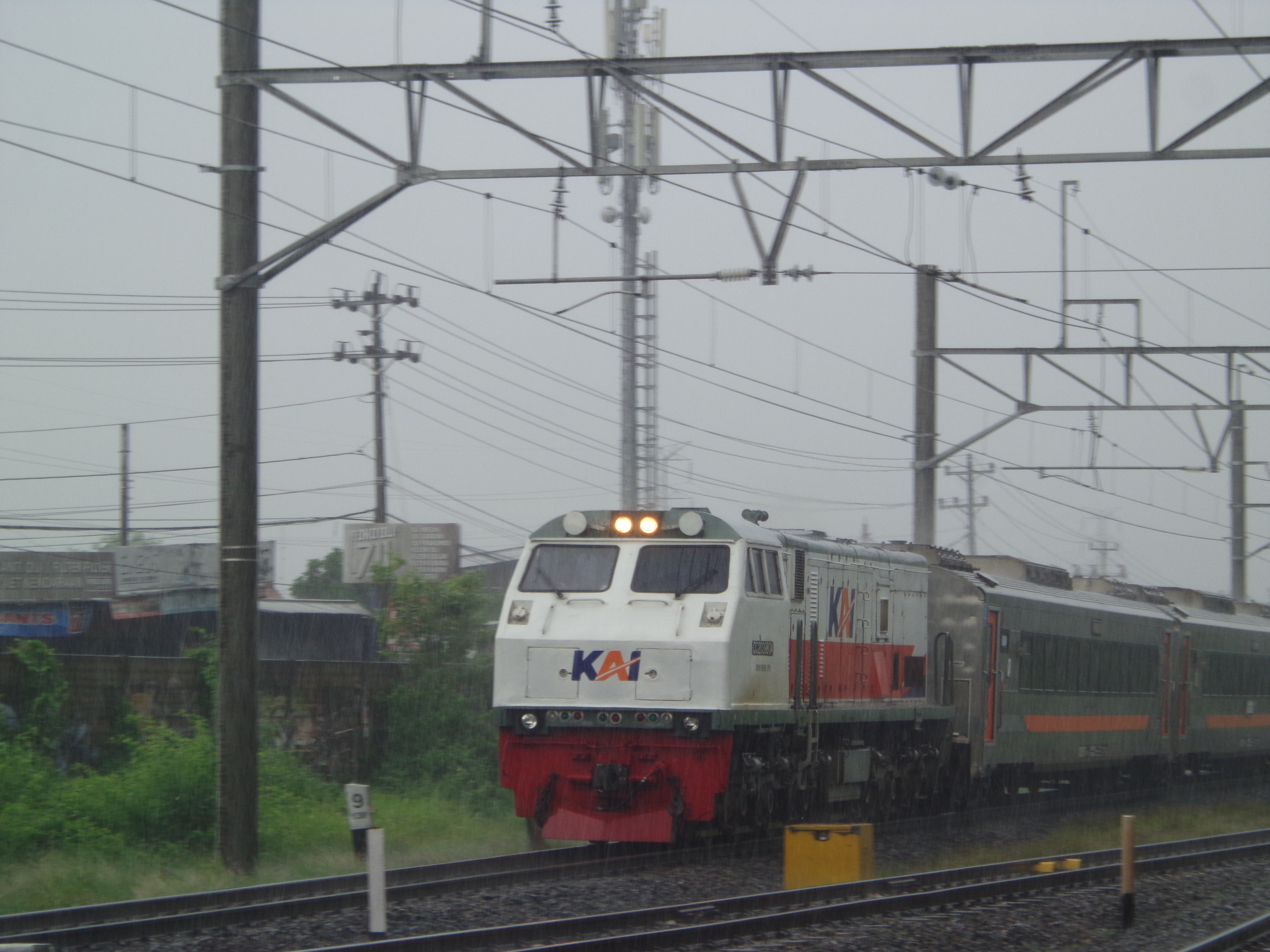
- Fajar Utama Solo train passing Klaten during rain, 2024

Overview
- Service type: Inter-city rail
- Status: Operatioal
- First service: 12 May 1986
- Current operator: Kereta Api Indonesia

Route
- Termini: Pasar Senen; Solo Balapan
- Distance travelled: 570 km (354 mil)
- Average journey time: 7 hours 47 minutes
- Service frequency: 1x Daily each way
- Train number: 73-74

On-board services
- Classes: executive & economy
- Seating arrangements: 50 seats arranged 2-2 (executive class); 72 seats arranged 2-2 (economy class)
- Catering facilities: On-board cafe and trolley service

Technical
- Rolling stock: CC206; CC203; CC201
- Track gauge: 1067 mm
- Operating speed: 70 km/h (50 mph) to 110 km/h (75 mph)
Route map

Fajar and Senja Utama Solo (in English are the Main Dawn and Dusk of Solo) are 2 passenger trains with the executive & economy which between Pasar Senen and Solo Balapan via Purwokerto and Yogyakarta.

The train only offer daily each way, like morning schedule heading to Solo Balapan use by the Fajar Utama Solo, while night schedule heading to Jakarta Pasar Senen by the Senja Utama Solo train around 570 km (354 mil) in 7 hours 48 minutes.

== History ==
The Senja Utama Solo train was launched on 14 October 1978 with the former serving Solo Balapan-Gambir, the business class service uses a train set made by Goša from Yugoslavia. The train set has a distinctive feature, namely the number of windows as many as eight on each side. The number of windows was later adjusted like other business trains.

In 1986, the Fajar Utama Solo train was launched that travel at morning.

In the 1990s, the train also carried executive-A, executive-B and couchette cars (sleeper cars with patented mattresses), before finally returning to full business. On 25 November 1994, business train couchette are priced with Rp33.000,00.

In 2016, The Fajar and Senja Utama Solo train return to serving executive class.

On 21 May 2019, the Fajar and Senja Utama train operates using a series of stainless steel trains made by PT INKA with executive class and premium economy services.

With the enactment of train travel chart as of 1 December 2019, this train has experienced changes to its travel schedule departure time from Jakarta is in the morning while departure time from Solo Balapan is in the evening so the name of the train has been adjusted.

On 31 January 2025, the Fajar and Senja Utama Solo train officially uses the latest generation of mixed executive and economy class trains made of stainless steel made by PT INKA Madiun. The Fajar and Senja Utama Solo trains use used Trainset 23 from the Direct Train route Semarang Tawang–Jakarta Gambir (not a handover from the Logawa series), for the premium economy trains will be transferred to the Purwokerto Depot (PWT) for the operation of this Logawa train.

== List of stations ==
On 1 February 2025, the Fajar and Senja Utama Solo train totally use the new generation from the Logawa train due the tunnel to Ketapang was narrow during testing.

- Pasar Senen
- Jatinegara
- Bekasi
- Karawang
- Haurgeulis
- Jatibarang
- Cirebon
- Purwokerto
- Kroya
- Sumpiuh
- Karanganyar
- Kebumen
- Kutoarjo
- Wates
- Yogyakarta
- Klaten
- Solo Balapan

== Incident ==
- On 21 January 1981, the Senja Utama Solo train collided with the Matarmaja train due to negligence from both the crews of the two trains and from the officers at Kebasen and Notog Station at that time.
- On 23 January 2014, the Senja Utama Solo train hitting residents and students at a level crossing in Banyuraden, Gamping, Sleman due to an error in the automatic crossing gate, resulting in four fatalities.
- On 19 May 2016, the Senja Utama Solo train was involved in an accident with an Avanza car with license plate number B 2198 TFO and a Transjakarta bus at a railroad crossing on Jalan Gunung Sahari Raya, Pademangan. There were no fatalities in the incident.
- On 22 September 2024, the incident of four people being killed by a train occurred on the upstream route Km 88+700 on the Cikampek-Tanjungrasa station road section, Daringo Village, South Pangulah Village, Kotabaru District, Karawang Regency, West Java. At that time, the Fajar Utama Solo train with the route Pasar Senen-Solo Balapan was passing from the direction of Pasar Senen towards Solo Balapan (heading towards Haurgeulis). Three victims were found lying around the scene of the incident, while one of the victims was stuck in the front bumper of the CC 204 03 01 YK locomotive until it reached Tanjungrasa station, Tanjungrasa Kidul Village, Patokbeusi District, Subang Regency.

== See also ==
- Argo Lawu
- Argo Dwipangga
- Lodaya
- Manahan
- Mataram
