= Batavia (train) =

Passenger train in Indonesia

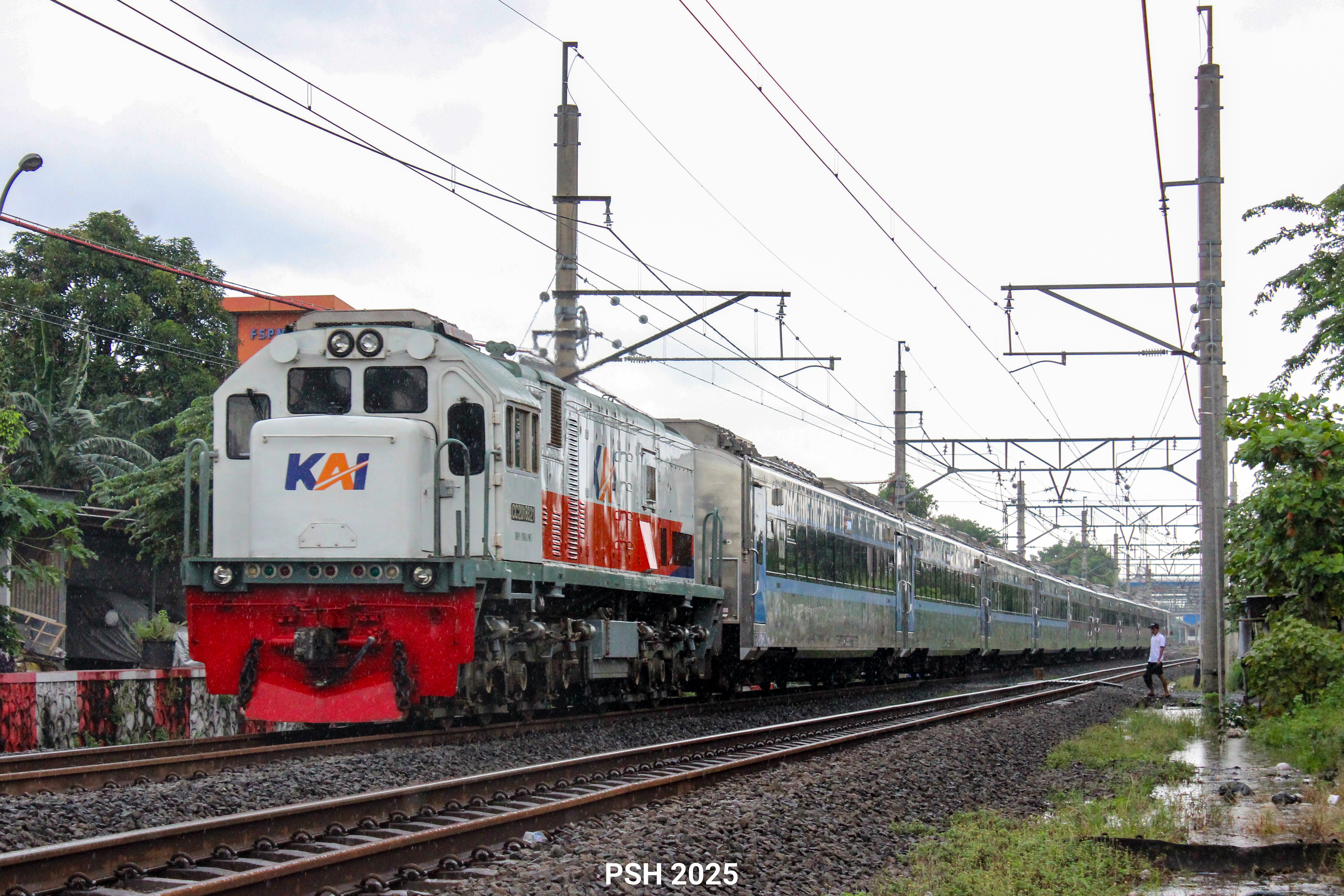
- 7006 Batavia train passed in Tambun, 2025

Overview
- Service type: Inter-city rail
- Status: Operational (facultative)
- Locale: Operational Area I Jakarta
- Predecessor: Manahan addition
- First service: 1 February 2025
- Current operator: Kereta Api Indonesia

Route
- Termini: Gambir; Solo Balapan
- Distance travelled: 571 kilometres (355 miles)
- Average journey time: 8 hours 25 minutes
- Service frequency: daily each way
- Train number: 7005-7006

On-board services
- Classes: economy and executive
- Seating arrangements: 50 seats arranged 2-2 (executive class); 72 seats arranged 2-2 (economy class)
- Catering facilities: On-board cafe and trolley service

Technical
- Rolling stock: CC203; CC201; CC204
- Track gauge: 1,067 mm
- Operating speed: 80–100 kilometres per hour (50–62 mph)
Route map
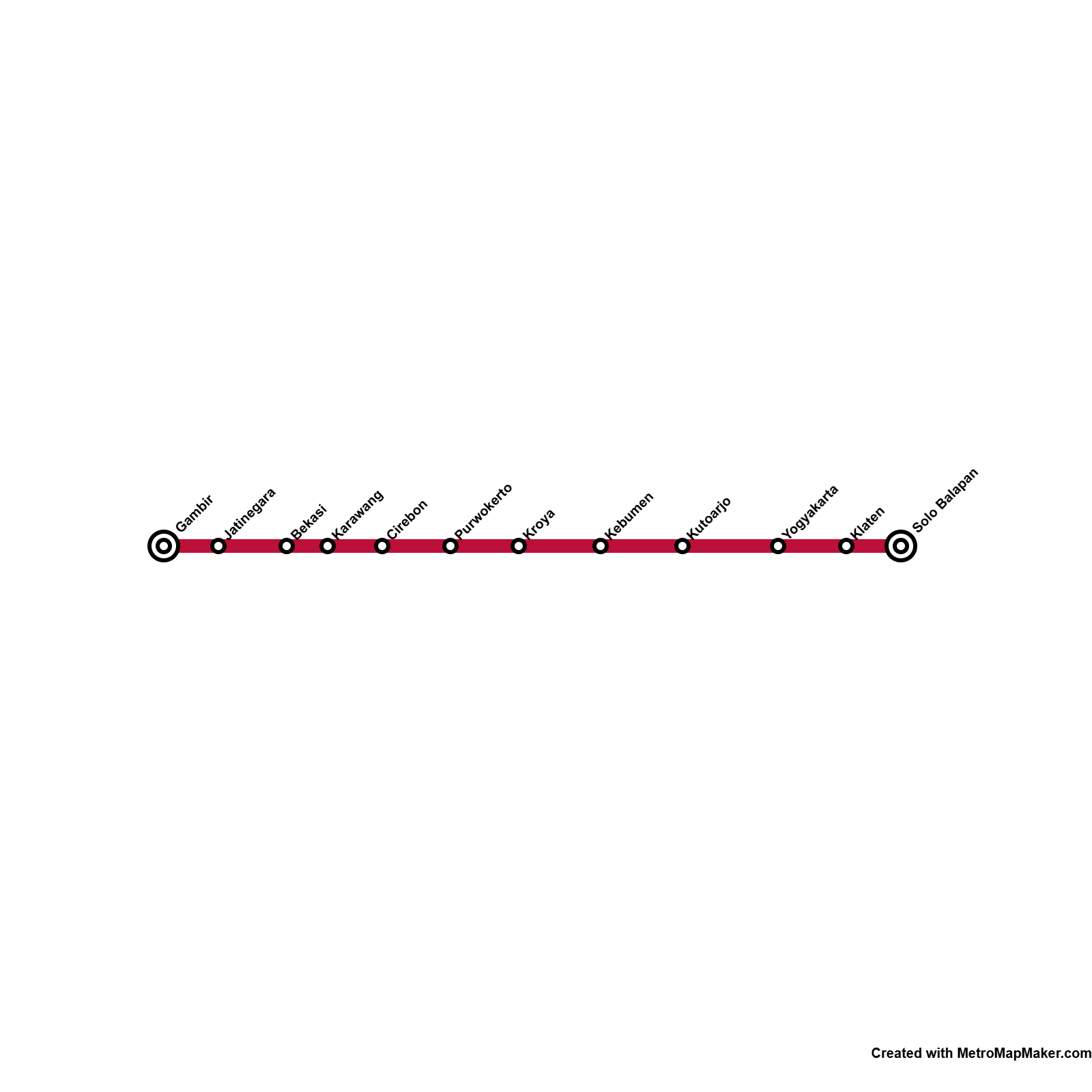

Batavia train is an Indonesian intercity passenger train operated by Kereta Api Indonesia (KAI). It runs on the Gambir and Solo Balapan route and was launched on 6 February 2025 as part of the 2025 train timetable The service is facultative, mainly operating on Thursday–Sunday and during selected holiday periods. The train uses a mixed stainless-steel formation of four executive and four economy coaches with a total of 488 seats.

== History ==
The train name "Batavia" is taken from Jakarta's former colonial-era name. KAI representatives explained that the name was chosen because Batavia is considered an important historical identity of Jakarta. The name is also intended to reflect the cultural and historical character of the cities connected by the service, namely Jakarta and Solo. KAI noted that it often uses historical or traditional names for its long-distance trains. Batavia is a rebranding of the KA Manahan Additional train that had been operating since 7 February 2024. The renaming was introduced at the same time as the launch of the 2025 timetable and the formal inauguration of the service. The earlier name Jayakarta, which preceded the colonial-era name Batavia, is also used for another service, the KA Jayakarta.

Batavia was inaugurated on 6 February 2025 at Gambir Station by Yuskal Setiawan, Executive Vice President Daop 1 Jakarta. The first departure left Gambir at 09.35 WIB and arrived at Solo Balapan at 18.00 WIB. The train operates using a mixed stainless-steel formation consisting of four executive coaches, each with 50 seats, and four economy coaches, each with 72 seats, for a total of 488 seats. During its initial four days of operation from 6 to 9 February 2025, the train carried 780 passengers, representing 40 percent of the available seats. By mid-February, 450 seats for subsequent departures had been booked.

On 1–4 May 2025, Batavia operated within Daop 6 Yogyakarta during the May Day long weekend to support increased passenger volume.

In November 2025, the service ran again as part of a set of facultative long-distance trains on selected dates between 1–30 November, serving the Solo Balapan–Gambir route.

== Stations ==
Batavia serves several major stops between Gambir and Solo Balapan, with the following station:

- Gambir (Start/End)
- Bekasi
- Karawang
- Cirebon
- Purwokerto
- Kroya
- Kebumen
- Kutoarjo
- Yogyakarta
- Klaten
- Solo Balapan (Start/End)
