= Sawunggalih =

Passenger train service in Indonesia

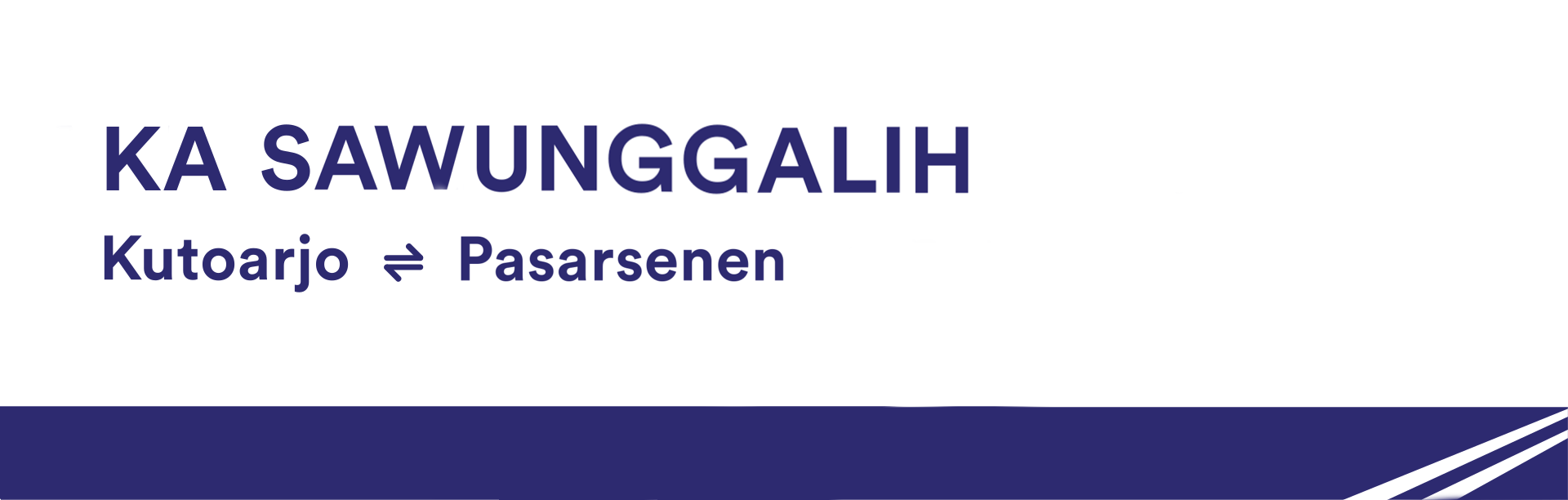

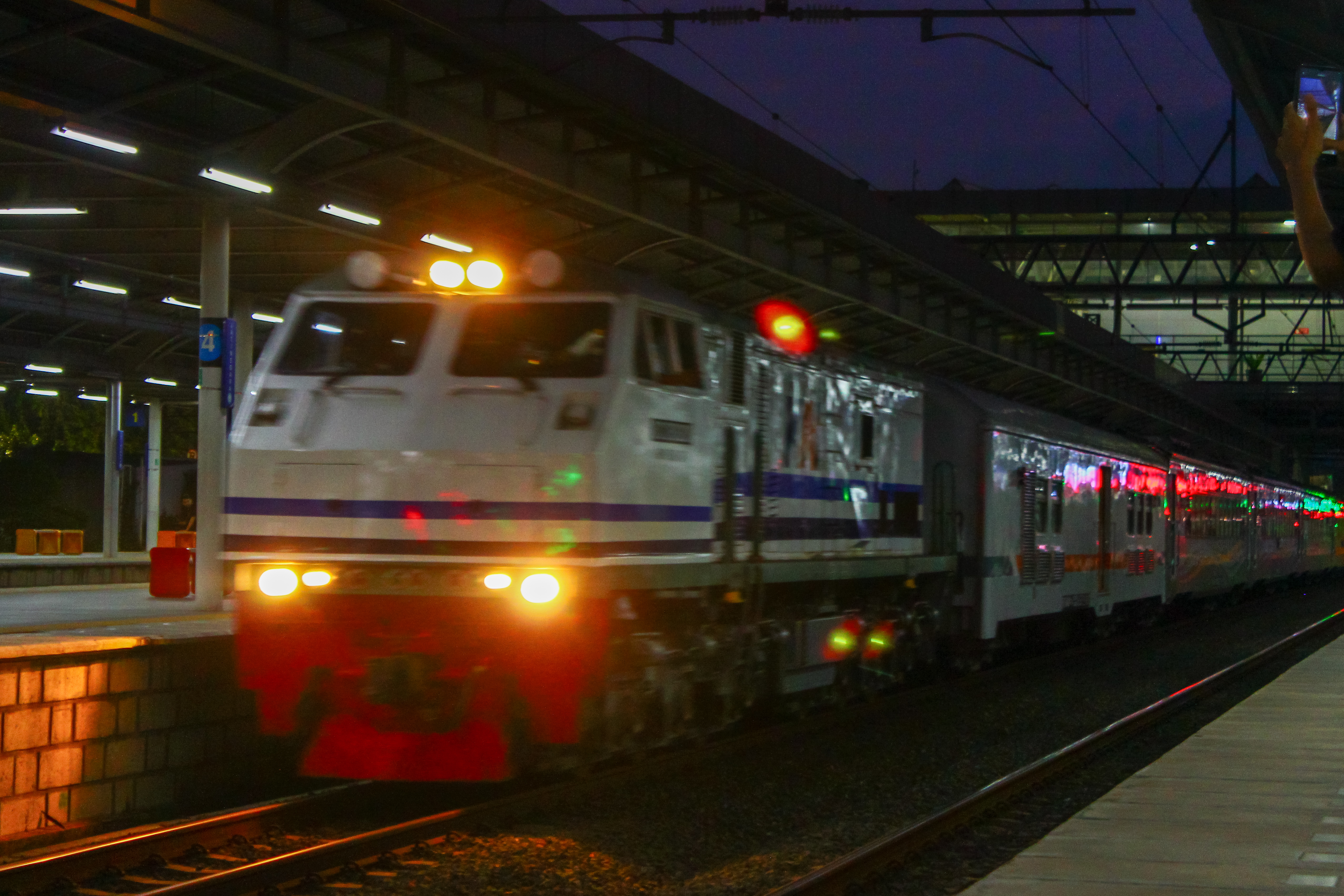
- Sawunggalih train passed in Jatinegara heading to Kutoarjo, 2024

Overview
- Service type: Inter-city rail
- Status: Operational
- Locale: Operational Area V Purwokerto
- Predecessor: Sawunggalih Utama
- First service: 31 May 1977
- Current operator: Kereta Api Indonesia

Route
- Termini: Pasar Senen; Kutoarjo
- Distance travelled: 447 kilometres (278 miles)
- Average journey time: 6 hours 5 minutes
- Service frequency: 3x daily each way
- Train number: 111-116

On-board services
- Classes: economy and executive
- Seating arrangements: 50 seats arranged 2-2 (executive class); 80 seats arranged 2-2 (premium economy class)
- Catering facilities: On-board cafe and trolley service

Technical
- Rolling stock: CC203; CC201
- Track gauge: 1,067 mm
- Operating speed: 80–120 kilometres per hour (50–75 mph)
Route map

Sawunggalih is a passenger train with executive and premium economy classes that is operated by Kereta Api Indonesia which runs between Pasar Senen and Kutoarjo via Purwokerto. The trip is around 447 km (278 mil) in 5 hours 50 minutes.

The Sawunggalih train also support for the Kutojaya Utara which from Jakarta Kota to Kutoarjo until the end on 31 January 2025 for regular schedule one day before the enactment of new train travel chart 2025 were effective.

The Sawunggalih train itself known as the good occupation for the west and south of Central Java people, especially the people went to Jakarta for work and back home to their homes in the west and south of Central Java. According to GAPEKA 2025, the Sawunggalih is the fastest mixed-class economy train in its category, covering the Kutoarjo–Pasar Senen route in just 5 hours and 50 minutes.

== Branding ==
The name Sawunggalih comes from the name of the commander of the troops under Diponegoro and a religious figure from the Kaleng Duchy (Rome), now Karanganyar, Kebumen, Central Java named Kyai Sawunggalih or Tumenggung Kartawiyaga Sawunggalih during the Diponegoro War around 1825-1830 (5 years).

== History ==
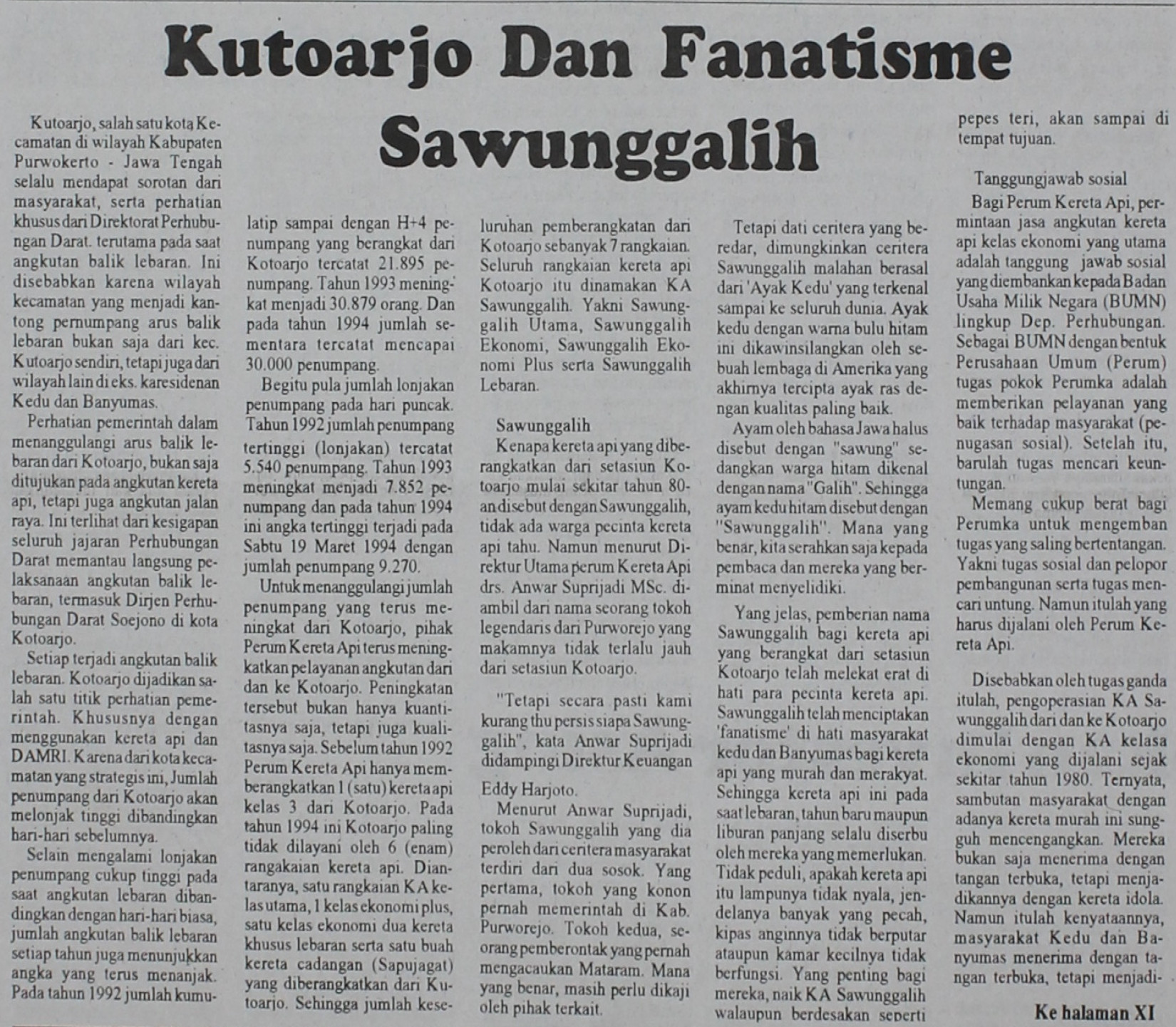
News discussing that various Sawunggalih train services. Yudha News Daily, 1994.

The Sawunggalih train was first time operated on 31 May 1977 and at its launch it used the locomotive BB201 08 as a pulling locomotive with mixed classes, namely business and economy class. It was only in 1984 that Sawunggalih became a full business class train. Meanwhile, the full economy train was served by Kutojaya Ekonomi. Actually, the forerunner of Sawunggalih has existed since 1964, namely as Fajar/Senja JKA400 which served the route Jakarta Kota Station to Purwokerto, Kroya, Gombong to Karanganyar.

In 1990s, The government is actively improving the quality of train services, especially executive and business class. On 31 May 1996 (the Sawunggalih trains birthday), the Sawunggalih Plus train was launched on the Gambir–Kutoarjo route, which provides 5 business class plus trains (K2 manufactured in 1991 and 1996) plus 4 executive class trains and is always pulled by the official locomotive CC203. Uniquely, the Sawunggalih Plus doesn't stop at Cirebon or Cirebon Prujakan. The Sawunggalih Plus train no longer, due to the 1998 Monetary Crisis, people's purchasing power decreased, resulting in one Sawunggalih train, the Sawunggalih Plus, being discontinued in 1999. In 2001, the Sawunggalih journey was again served by two trains. One train with 1-2 executive cars and 7 business cars remained named "Sawunggalih Utama". Meanwhile, another train with 8-9 business sets was named "Kutojaya Bisnis".

Not long after, the full business class Kutojaya Bisnis train was merged into the full business class Sawunggalih Utama train, with one other train still carrying executive class. In 2012, all Sawunggalih Utama business class trains were equipped with air conditioning (split AC). Sawunggalih Utama became the first business class train to be equipped with air conditioning, along with the Argo Parahyangan, Gumarang, and Purwojaya train.

In 2018, all Sawunggalih Utama trains were replaced with stainless steel trains manufactured by PT INKA in 2018, with a formation of 2 Stainless Steel Executive and 6 Premium Economy. On 19 June 2022, the Sawunggalih train will adding a stop at Cikarang.

However on 1 December 2025, the Sawunggalih train will passed in Sumpiuh (for 111 and 114), Gombong (for 112 and 116), and Bumiayu (for 113), that meaning the Sawunggalih train no service in Sumpiuh (111 and 114 only), Gombong (112 and 116), and Bumiayu (113 only) station for the passenger service, only the 115 Sawunggalih train that stopped at three stations after the day.

== Station ==
Here's route of the Sawunggalih train based on the enactment of new train travel chart 2025 is:

- Pasar Senen (start/end)
- Jatinegara
- Bekasi
- Cikarang
- Cirebon
- Bumiayu (no stopped for 113 effected on 1 December 2025)
- Purwokerto
- Kroya
- Gombong (no stopped for 112 and 116 effected on 1 December 2025)
- Sumpiuh (no stopped for 111 and 114 effected on 1 December 2025)
- Karang Anyar
- Kebumen
- Kutoarjo (start/end)

== Incident ==
- On 1 September 2024, the Sawunggalih train 150 heading to Kutoarjo collision with a truck in between Ciledug and Ketanggungan there were no fatalities of the truck driver, crew, or passenger train, also causing the train were delayed in 80 minutes.
- On 29 December 2024, the Sawunggalih train collision with a public vehicle in between Jatinegara and Pasar Senen.
