= Sancaka =

Passenger train service in Indonesia

- Sancaka Siang train with GE CM20EMP passing at Kewek railway bridge after departured from Yogyakarta, 2026

Overview
- Service type: Inter-city rail
- Status: Operational (Regular & Facultative)
- Locale: Operational VI Yogyakarta
- First service: 20 May 1997
- Current operator: Kereta Api Indonesia

Route
- Termini: Yogyakarta; Surabaya Gubeng
- Distance travelled: 309 km (192 mil)
- Average journey time: 4 hours
- Service frequency: 4x Daily each way
- Train numbers: 81-86 (regular); 87F-88F (facultative)

On-board services
- Classes: executive & premium economy
- Seating arrangements: 50 seats arranged 2-2 (executive class); 80 seats arranged 2-2 (premium economy class)
- Catering facilities: On-board cafe and trolley service

Technical
- Rolling stock: CC206
- Track gauge: 1067 mm
- Operating speed: 90 - 120 km/h (55 - 75 mph)
Route map
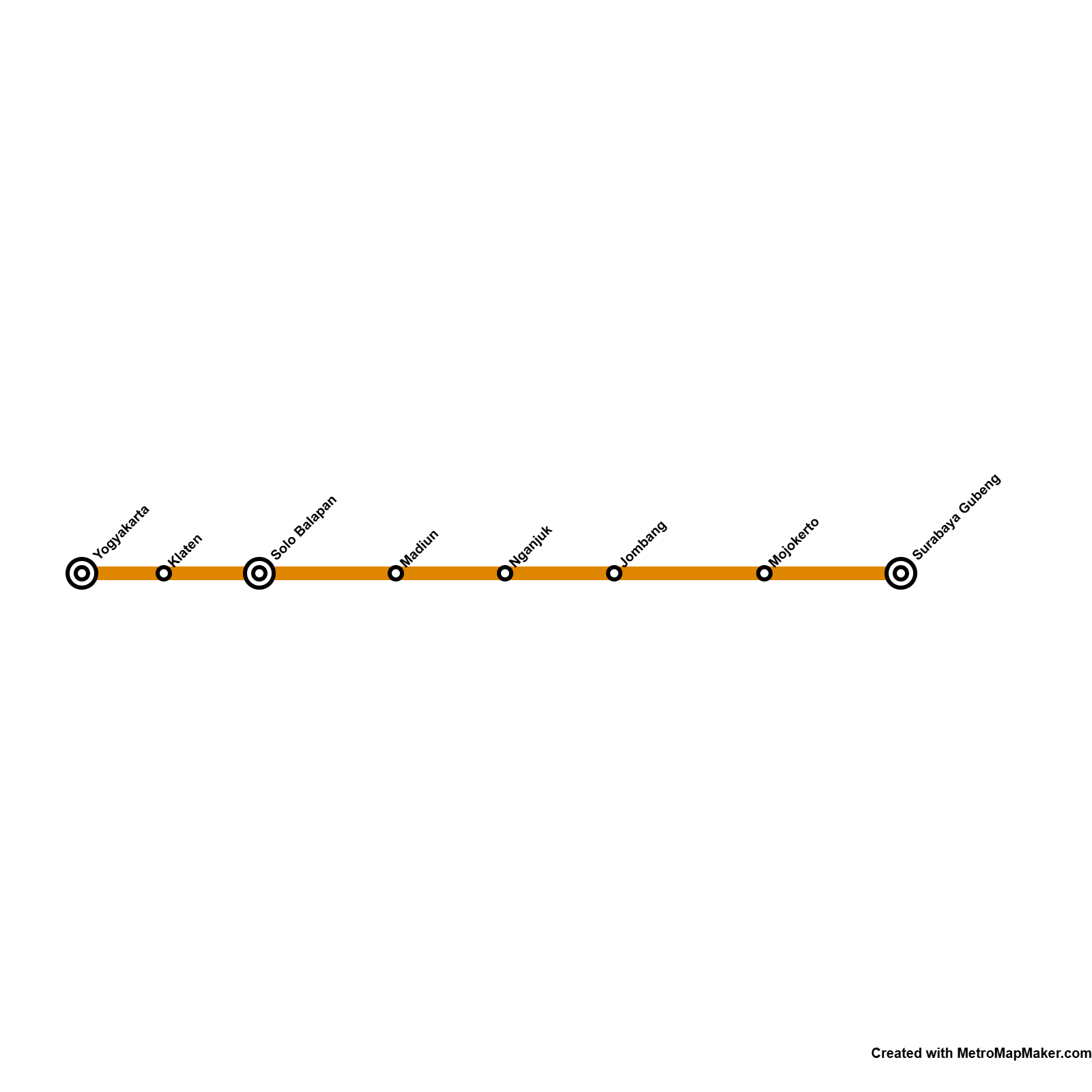

Sancaka is a mixed class passenger train with executive and premium economy class operated by Kereta Api Indonesia which run between Yogyakarta and Surabaya Gubeng via Solo Balapan. This train offer 4x travel around 309 km (192 mil) in 4 hours.

Unlike with the Taksaka train which between Jakarta Gambir & Yogyakarta via Purwokerto that origin from the Taksaka (dragon), the Sancaka is origin from the Queen of Sanca snake because she was very brave and protection everything. Sancaka it self was start operation on 20 May 1997.

== Mythology ==
Sancaka is a mythological animal in the form of a snake, the snake is a queen who protects and can survive in all circumstances. Surabaya and outside citizen weren't stranger with the Sancaka train which from Surabaya to Yogyakarta.

== History ==
=== Sancaka train (1997 - 2018) ===
The Sancaka train first operated on 20 May 1997, departing from Surabaya in the morning and from Yogyakarta in the afternoon. The train then launched the Sancaka II train on 1 December 2002 to provide a travel option with a different departure time than before.

Initially, the Sancaka train operated serving executive and business classes—before the business class service changed to economy plus class on 16 October 2016. Around 2012, KA Sancaka I once carried 2 economy class carriages and a Madura Batik sticker restoration carriage, while KA Sancaka II once carried 2 economy plus class carriages.

=== Sancaka train (2019 - Present) ===
As of 8 April 2019, Sancaka trains operate using stainless steel train sets made by PT INKA with executive class and premium economy services.

On 10 February 2021, The status of the Sancaka YK train journey with departures from Yogyakarta in the morning and from Surabaya in the afternoon has been changed to an optional train that operates at certain times. This mean the Sancaka train as a facultative train from Yogyakarta & Surabaya.

Since the enactment of new train travel chart 2023 on 1 June 2023, Sancaka train service has been increased to three regular daily trips (morning, afternoon, and evening) and one optional night trip operated on weekends, National holidays and Joint leave. Added together, Sancaka has a total of four round-trip trips with an average travel time of 4 hours.

=== Schedule ===
From August 2020 until the implementation of the Train Travel Chart on 10 February 2021, the Sancaka train experienced a reduction in stopping stations, thereby shortening travel times. The stations affected by the reduction in train stops include Kertosono and Ngawi. Nganjuk and Klaten previously didn't serve the Sancaka train stop, but both stations have now returned to service as of April 2021. This train The journey from Surabaya Gubeng to Yogyakarta takes 4 hours based on the travel schedule as of 10 February 2021, one hour faster than the 5-hour journey as of 1 December 2019.

Since 1 February 2022, the Sancaka train's morning departures from Yogyakarta and afternoon departures from Surabaya changed its status from optional to regular. Evening departures remain under the "Additional Sancaka" status, operating only occasionally.

On 1 June 2023, Sancaka has a total of four round-trip trips with an average travel time of 4 hours, with a breakdown of three regular trips (morning, afternoon, and evening) and one night trip operating on weekends, national holidays and joint leave.

== List of the Station ==
On 1 February 2025 following of the enactment of new train travel chart 2025, the Sancaka train was added only 4 travel each way, also the Sancaka Facultative for the Holiday, like Ramadan, Eid al-Fitr, etc.

- Yogyakarta (Start/End)
- Klaten
- Solo Balapan
- Madiun
- Nganjuk
- Jombang
- Mojokerto
- Surabaya Gubeng (Start/End)

== Accident & Incident ==
- On 6 April 2018 at 18.25 local time, the Sancaka 86 train to Surabaya Gubeng crashes with a truck carrying rail sleepers and cars at km 215+8 in Sambirejo, Mantingan, Ngawi. This accident was caused by a truck breaking down on the rails while trying to pass an unmarked illegal crossing and resulted in the deaths of a engine driver and a construction worker double track, an assistant engineer suffering broken bones, and around 500 passengers were stranded. This accident resulted in severe delays to trains on the Madiun–Solo line.
- On 6 July 2025, the Sancaka Facultative 88F train, from Yogyakarta to Surabaya experienced another incident. The train was the target of stone throwing by unknown people while passing through the area between Klatan and Srowot Station, Klaten, at around 22:45 WIB,causing 2 Passengers at executive class were minor injured.

== See also ==
- Taksaka
- Turangga
- Sembrani
- Gumarang
- Lodaya
- Kereta Api Indonesia
- Sancaka (snake)
