= Kebumen railway station =

Railway station in Indonesia

Kebumen Station Stasiun Kebumen
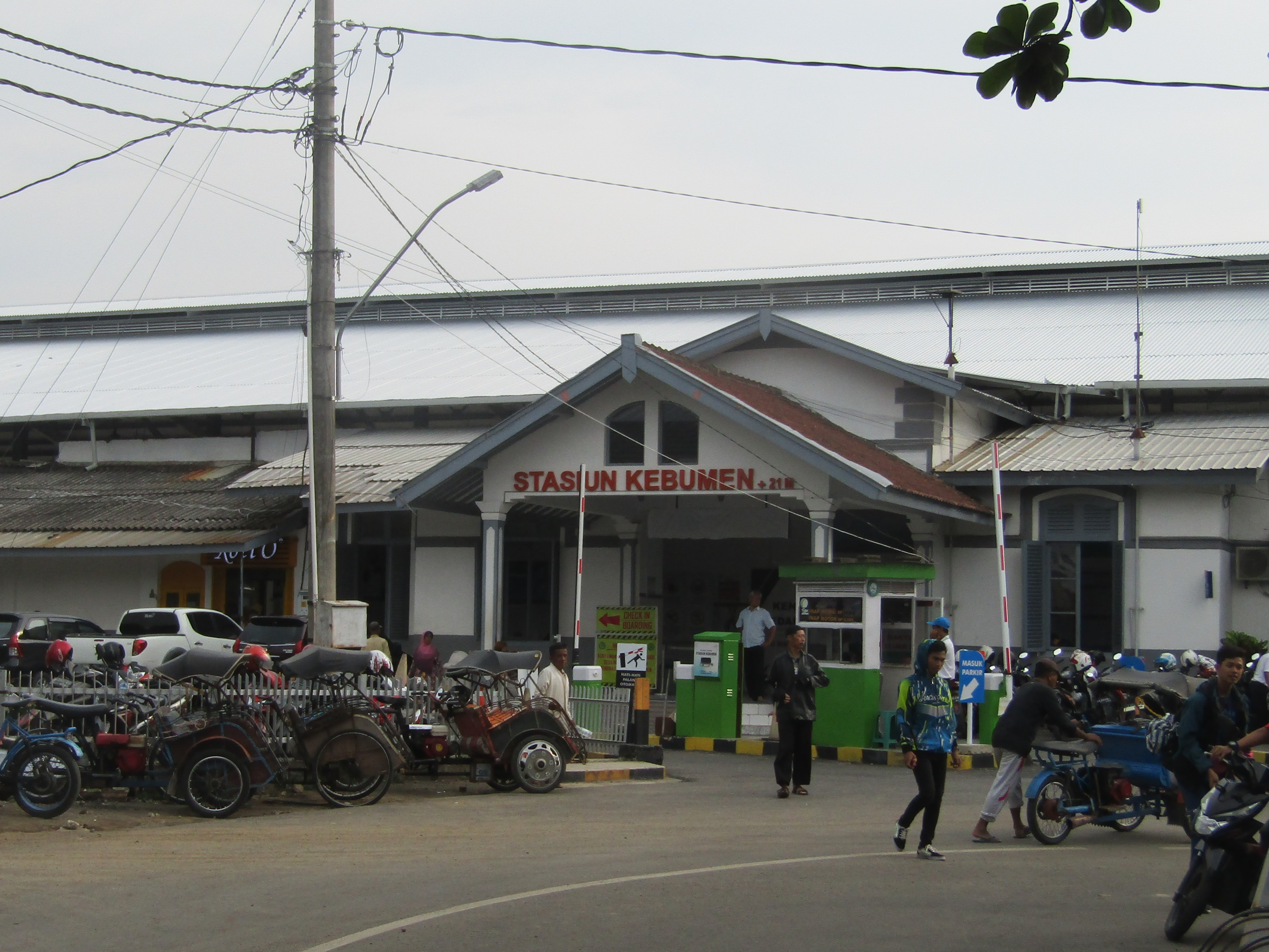
- Kebumen Station entrance, as of 2019

General information
- Location: Panjer, Kebumen, Kebumen Regency; Central Java; Indonesia
- Coordinates: 7.68188°S 109.662°E
- Elevation: +21 m (69 ft)
- Owner: Kereta Api Indonesia
- Operator: Kereta Api Indonesia
- Line: Kroya–Kutoarjo
- Platforms: 1 side platform 3 island platforms
- Tracks: 5

Construction
- Structure type: Ground
- Parking: Available
- Accessible: Available
- Architectural style: Indische Empire

Other information
- Station code: KM • 2028
- Classification: Large class type C

History
- Opened: 16 July 1887
- Former names: Keboemen Station
- Original company: Staatsspoorwegen Oosterlijnen
Location
- Location within Kebumen Regency

Kebumen Station (KM) is a large class type C railway station located in Panjer, Kebumen, Kebumen Regency, the railway station is included in the Operational Area V Purwokerto and is located at an altitude of +21 meters. As the main station in Kebumen Regency and located near the administrative center of Kebumen Regency, most trains passing on the southern route of Java stop at this station.

To the northwest of this station, before Sruweng Station, there is Soka Station which has been inactive since the double tracks was operated.

== Building and layout ==
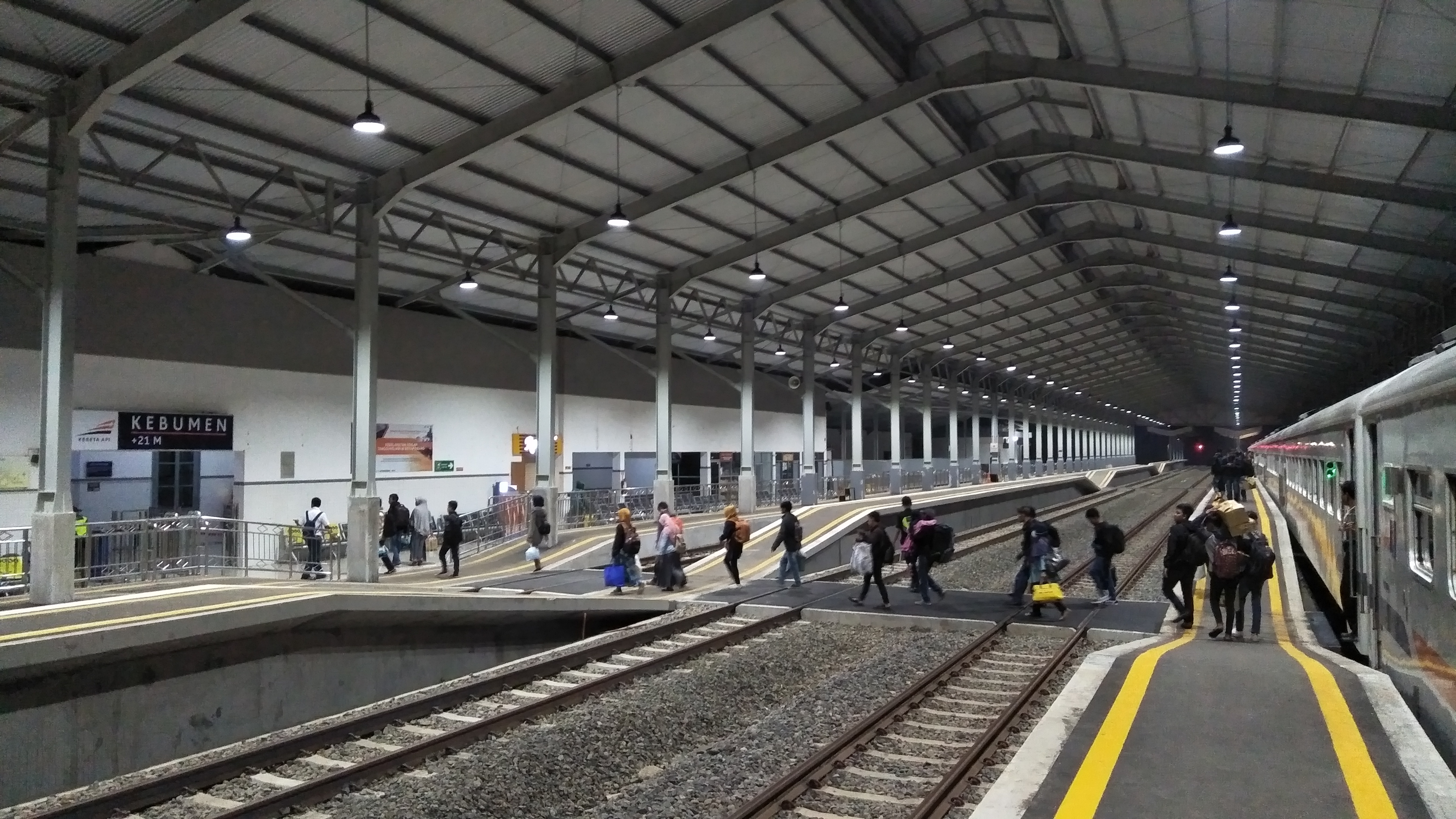
The emplacement of the station with the Kutojaya Selatan train picking up and dropping off passengers, March 2020

Kebumen Station has five train lines. At first, line 2 was a straight line. Lines 4 and 5 were dismantled in 2014 because they still used small rails and were rarely used. After the double track was operated from this station to Wonosari Station as of 14 December 2019 and then following the completion of the rebuilding of the Renville Bridge as of 5 May 2020, the emplacement of this station was slightly overhauled and extended to the southeast. Line 2 was used as a straight track towards Kroya only, line 3 was used as a straight track towards Kutoarjo, and lines 4 and 5 were completely rebuilt. The overcapping roof that covers all the tracks at this station has been replaced with a new one and is bigger in size. The station platform has also been extended and raised so that it can accommodate long series of trains and makes it easier for passengers to get on and off the platform. The old station building has been preserved because some of the buildings, such as the blinds window in front of the station, are still original. In addition, the old electric signaling produced by Westinghouse Rail Systems which has been in operation since 1999 has been replaced with the newest one produced by PT Len Industri.

In the past, line 5 was connected to the weigh bridge to the east of the emplacement, which is now a cultural heritage site. Here there was also a rail branch to the Luk Ulo River which was previously used for sand transport services, but this line has long been decommissioned.

Since the double track was put into operation, this station now has a unique feature on its track diagram, namely the existence of a switch point which is almost two kilometers to the northwest of the station. The rail switch was deliberately placed quite far from the station because there was a large bend that resembled the letter S and also the Renville Bridge which spanned the river.

== Services ==
The following is a list of train services at the Kebumen Station.

=== Passenger services ===
- Executive class
  - Bima & Argo Semeru, to Gambir via Purwokerto–Cirebon
  - Gajayana, to Malang via Blitar
  - Taksaka, to Gambir via Purwokerto–Cirebon (morning and night trips) and to Yogyakarta (night trips)
  - Turangga, to Bandung via Tasikmalaya
- Mixed class
  - Bogowonto, to Lempuyangan (executive–economy)
  - Fajar Utama YK, to Yogyakarta (executive–economy)
  - Gajahwong, to Pasar Senen via Purwokerto–Cirebon Prujakan and to Lempuyangan (executive–economy)
  - Gaya Baru Malam Selatan, to Pasar Senen via Purwokerto–Cirebon Prujakan and to Surabaya Gubeng via Yogyakarta–Solo Balapan–Madiun–Jombang (executive–economy)
  - Joglosemarkerto, looping train Central Java and Special Region of Yogyakarta (executive–economy) with the destination of:
    - Tegal
    - Solo Balapan
  - Kutojaya Utara, to Pasar Senen via Purwokerto–Cirebon Prujakan and to Kutoarjo (business–economy)
  - Lodaya, to Bandung via Tasikmalaya and to Solo Balapan via Yogyakarta (executive–economy–business)
  - Logawa, to Purwokerto and to Surabaya Gubeng (business–economy)
  - Malabar, to Bandung and to Malang (executive–business–economy)
  - Mataram, to Pasar Senen and to Solo Balapan (executive–business)
  - Mutiara Selatan, to Bandung via Tasikmalaya and to Malang via Yogyakarta–Solo Balapan–Madiun–Jombang (executive–economy)
  - Ranggajati, to Cirebon via Purwokerto and to Surabaya Gubeng (executive–business)
  - Sawunggalih, to Pasar Senen via Purwokerto–Cirebon and to Kutoarjo (executive–economy)
  - Senja Utama YK, to Pasar Senen via Purwokerto–Cirebon and to Yogyakarta (executive–economy)
  - Singasari, to Pasar Senen via Purwokerto–Cirebon and to Blitar via Lempuyangan–Purwosari–Madiun (executive–economy)
  - Wijayakusuma, to Cilacap and to Ketapang (executive–economy)
  - Malioboro Express, to Purwokerto and to Malang (executive-economy)
- Economy class
  - Bengawan, to Pasar Senen via Purwokerto–Cirebon Prujakan and to Purwosari via Lempuyangan
  - Jaka Tingkir, to Purwosari via Lempuyangan
  - Jayakarta, to Surabaya Gubeng via Yogyakarta–Solo Balapan–Madiun
  - Kahuripan, to Blitar via Lempuyangan–Purwosari–Madiun and to Kiaracondong via Tasikmalaya
  - Kutojaya Selatan, to Kiaracondong via Tasikmalaya and to Kutoarjo
  - Kutojaya Utara, to Jakarta Kota via Purwokerto–Cirebon Prujakan and to Kutoarjo
  - Pasundan, to Kiaracondong and to Surabaya Gubeng via Lempuyangan–Purwosari–Madiun–Jombang
  - Progo, to Pasar Senen via Purwokerto–Cirebon Prujakan and to Lempuyangan
  - Sawunggalih, to Pasar Senen via Purwokerto–Cirebon and to Kutoarjo (executive–economy)

=== Freight services ===
- Over Night Services, the destination of:
  - Surabaya Kota via Lempuyangan–Madiun–Jombang and to Bandung via Tasikmalaya
  - Malang via Lempuyangan–Madiun–Blitar and to Jakarta Gudang via Purwokerto

== Gallery ==
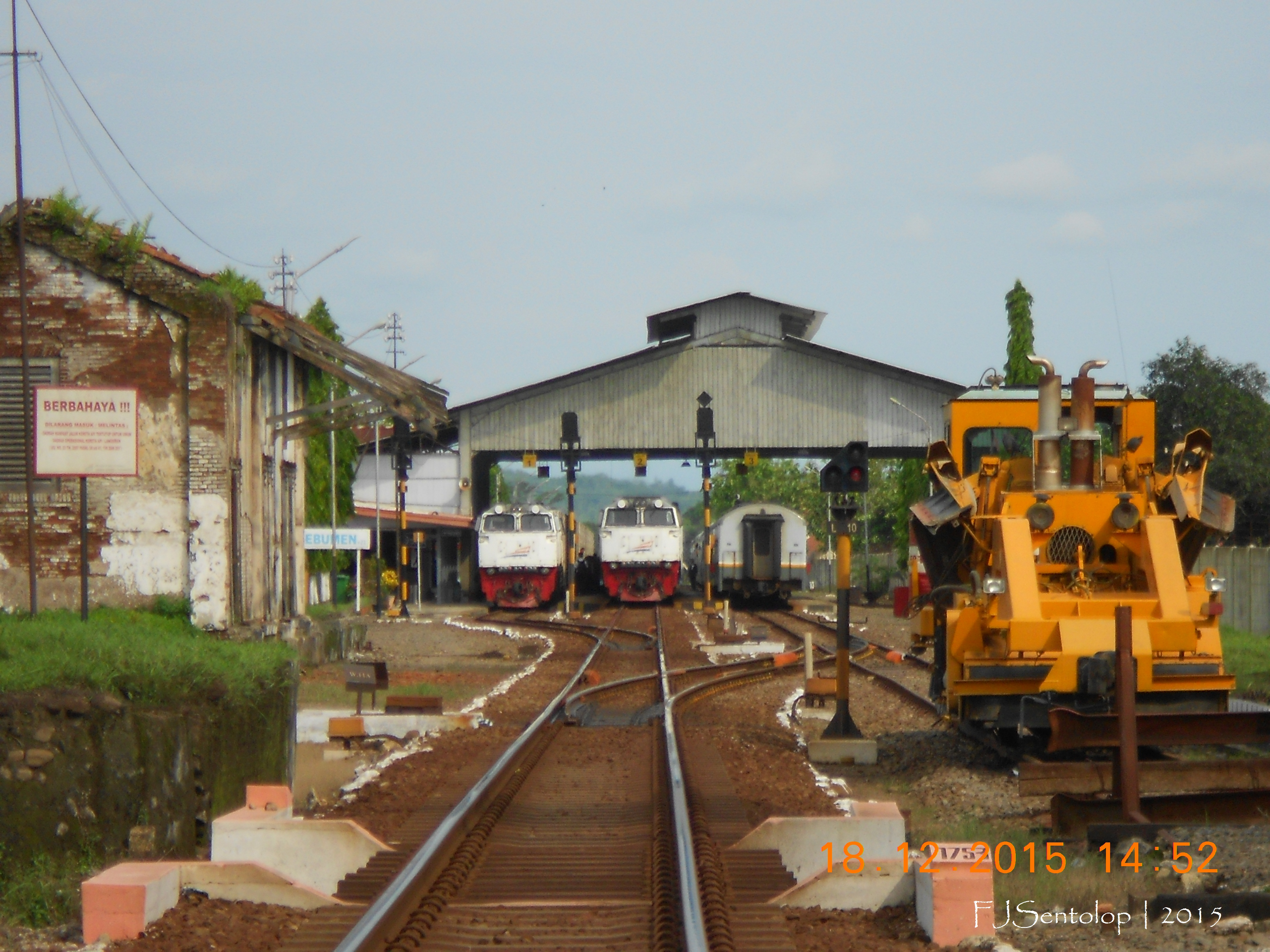
The emplacement of the station seen from afar

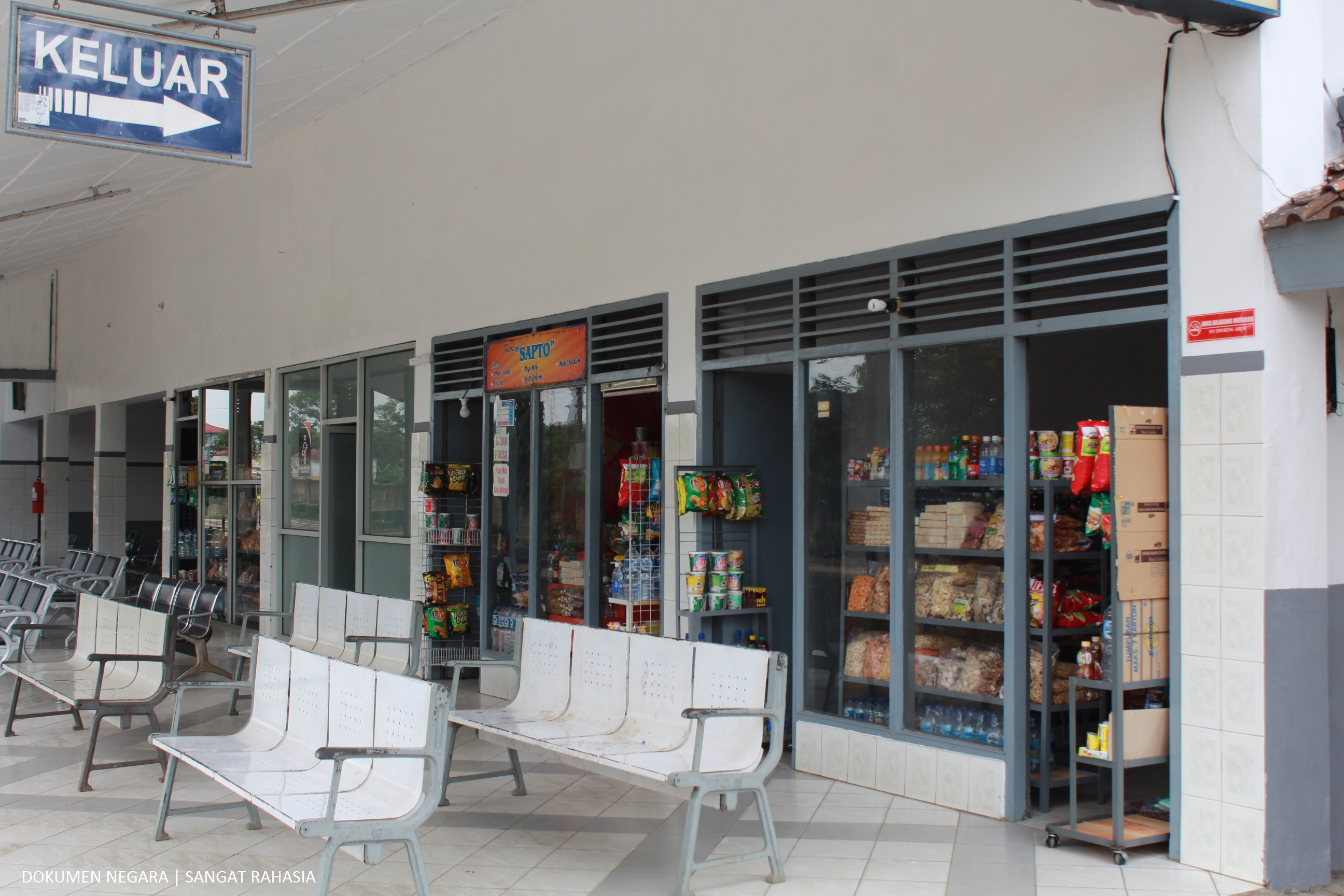
Kiosks at Kebumen Station (2017)

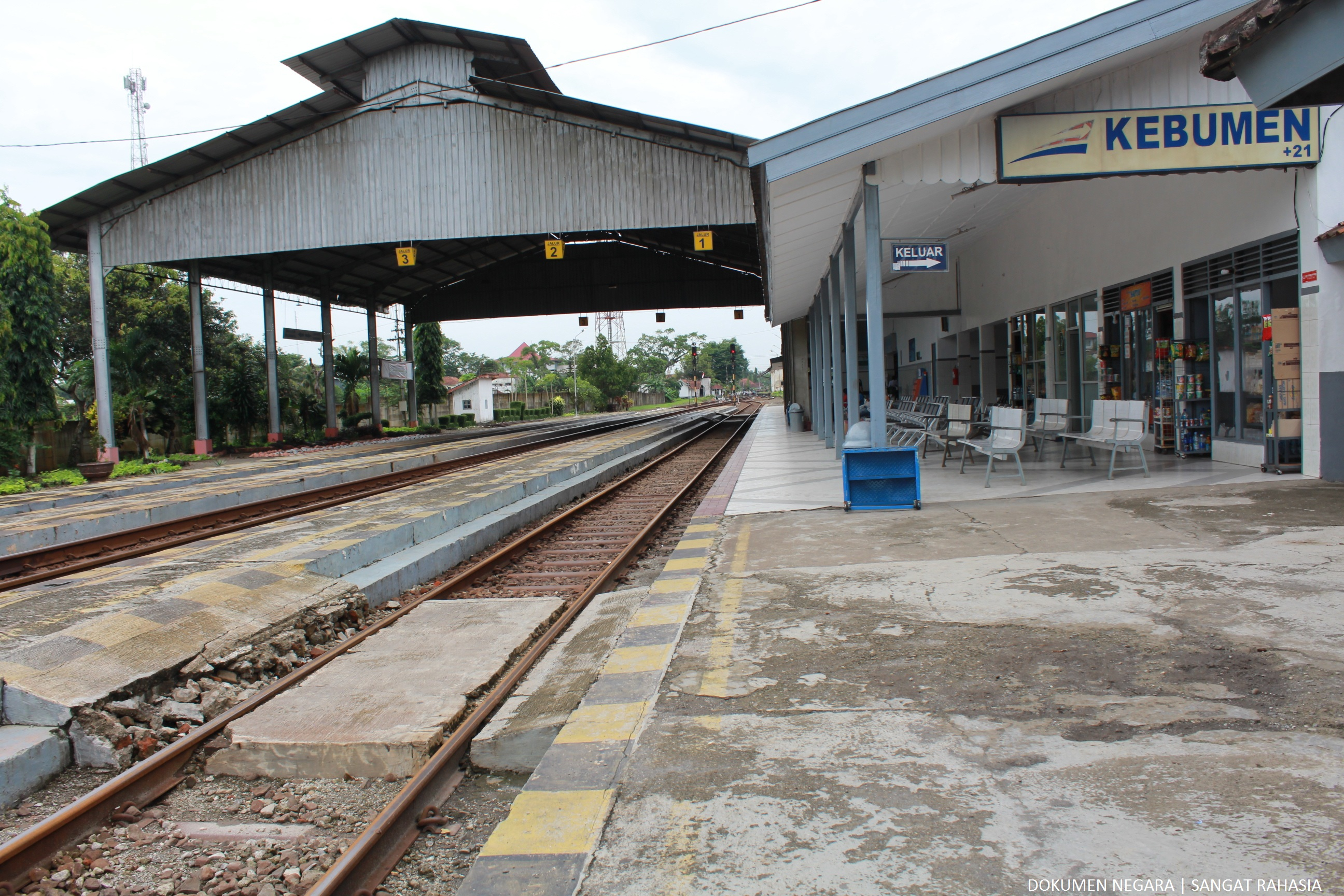
The platform of the station (2017)

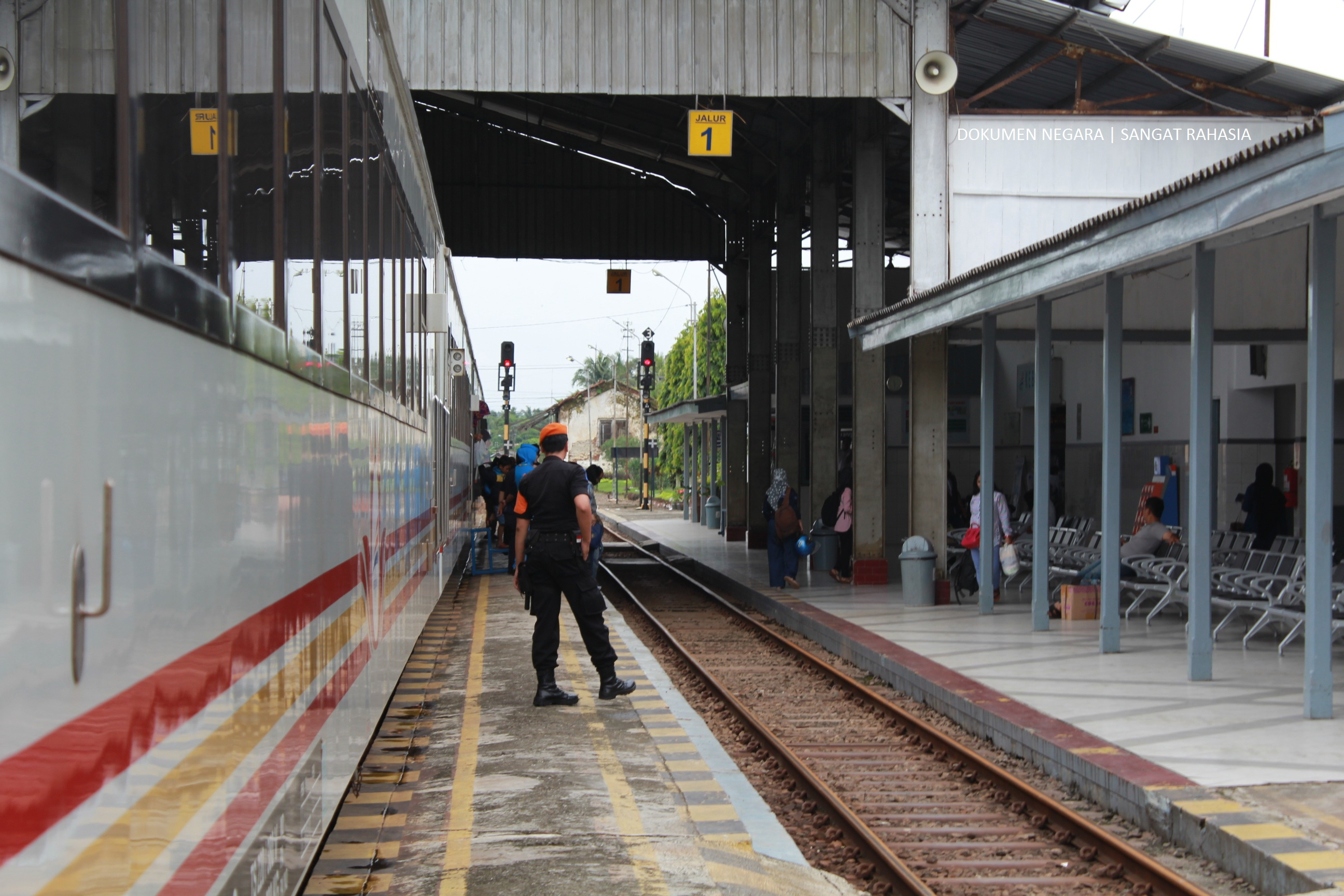
Wijayakusuma train at Kebumen Station (2017)

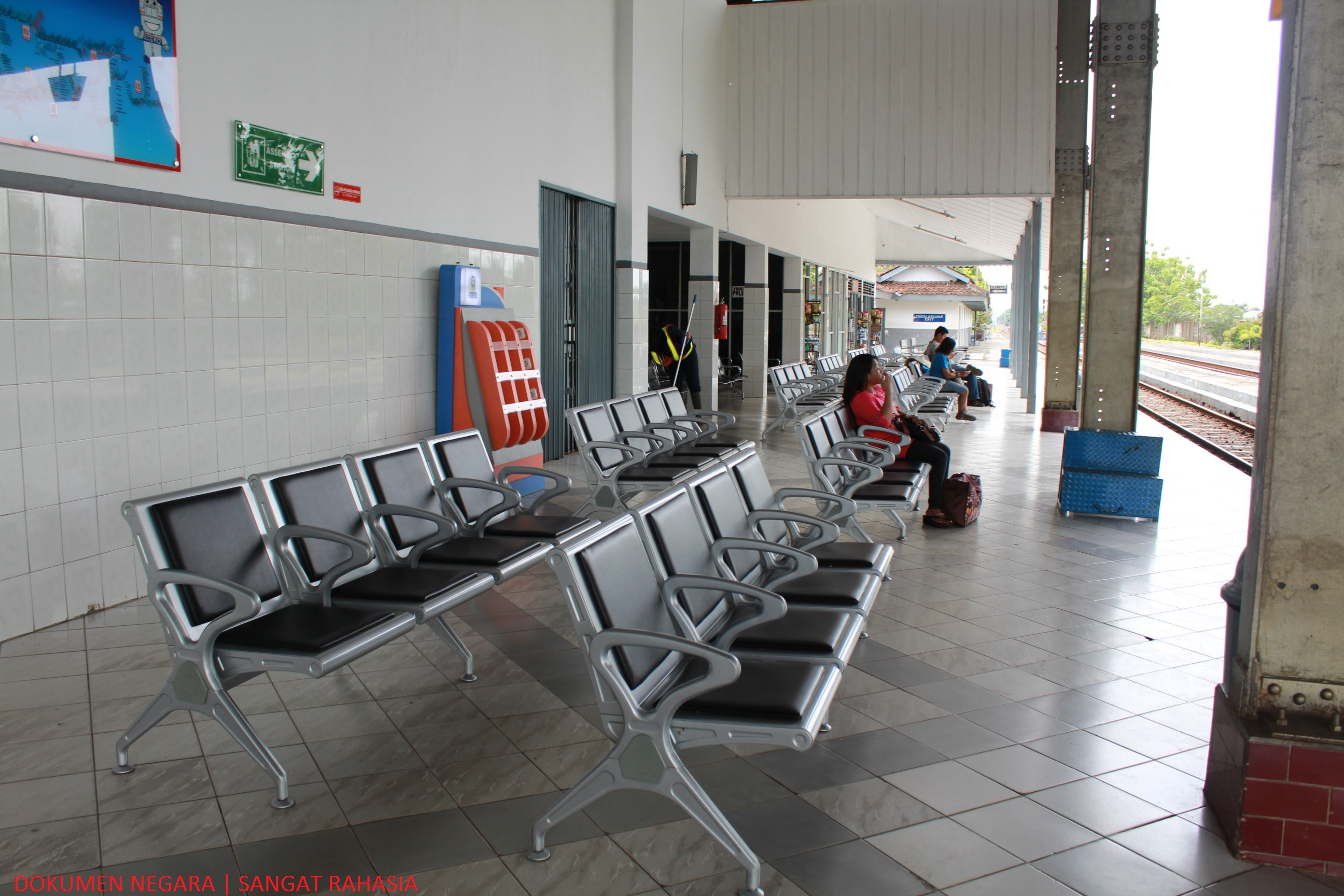
The waiting room inside the station

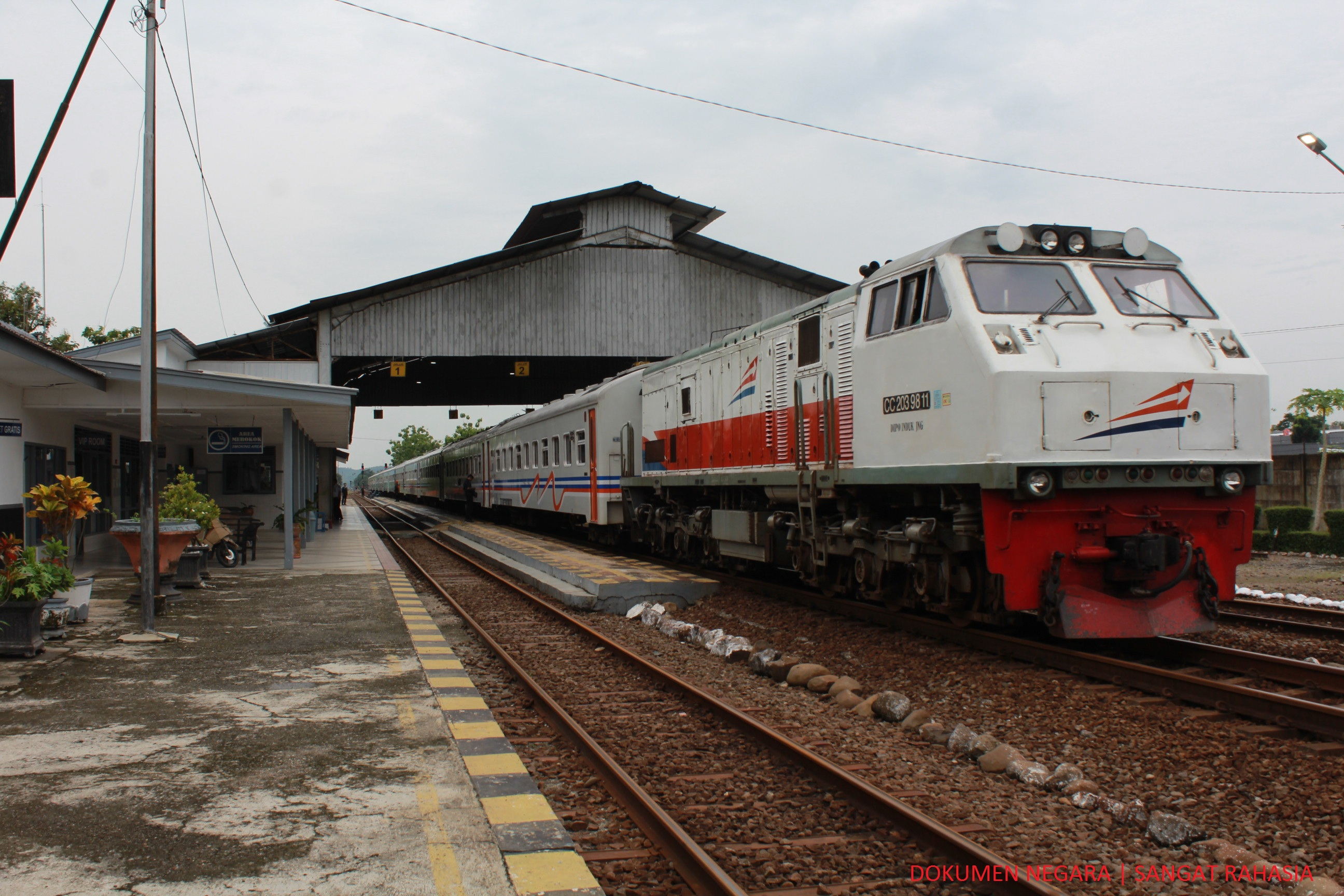
Additional Kutojaya Utara train departing from Kebumen Station (2017)

Preceding station	Kereta Api Indonesia	Following station
Soka towards Kroya	Kroya–Kutoarjo	Wonosari towards Kutoarjo
