= Manahan (train) =

Passenger train service between Jakarta and Surakarta (Solo), Indonesia

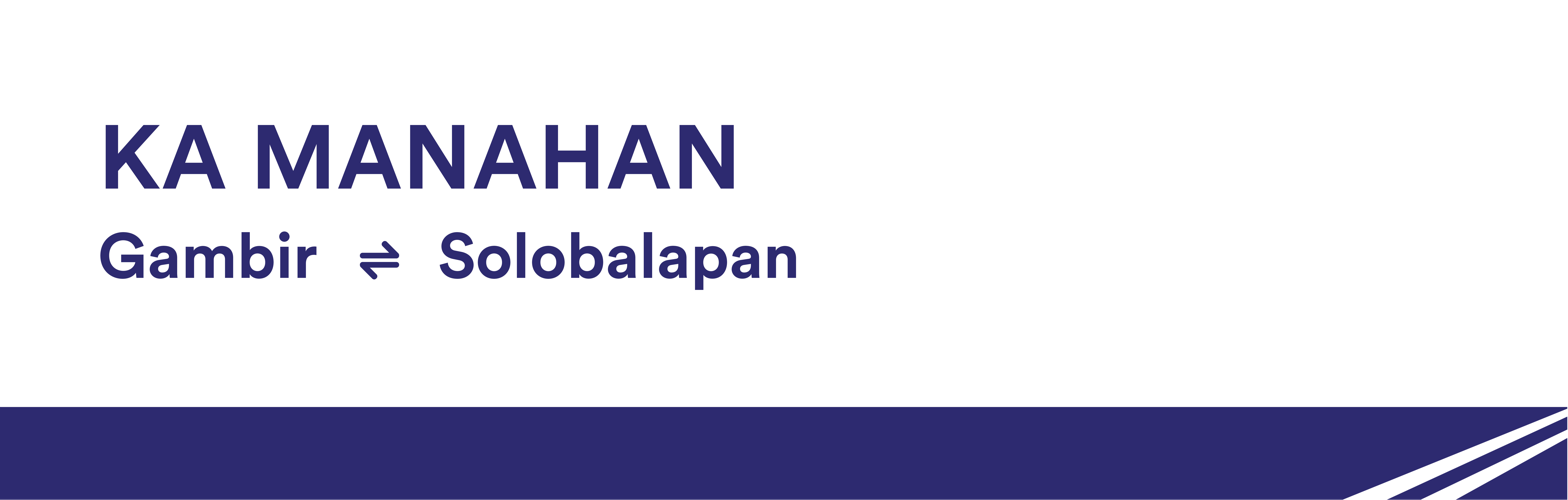

- Manahan train at Solo Balapan Station before departured to Gambir Station

Overview
- Service type: Inter-city rail
- Status: Operational
- First service: 1 June 2023
- Current operator: Kereta Api Indonesia

Route
- Termini: Gambir; Solo Balapan
- Distance travelled: 571 km (354 mil)
- Average journey time: 7 hours 47 minutes
- Service frequency: 2x Daily each way
- Train number: 61-64

On-board services
- Classes: executive & panoramic
- Seating arrangements: 50 seats arranged 2–2 (executive) seats can recline and rotate; 38 seats arranged 2-2 (panoramic) seats can recline and rotate
- Catering facilities: On-board cafe and trolley service

Technical
- Rolling stock: CC206; CC203; CC201
- Track gauge: 1067 mm
- Operating speed: 80 km/h (50 mph) to 120 km/h (75 mph)
Route map

Manahan train is an passenger train with the executive & priority class that operated by Kereta Api Indonesia which between Gambir and Solo Balapan via Purwokerto and Yogyakarta.

The train offer 2x daily each way like morning & night schedule approximately 571 kilometers (354 mil) in 7 hours 47 minutes. The Manahan train also support for Argo Lawu & Argo Dwipangga that the same route.

== Branding ==
The name Manahan is the name of a figure from Central Java named Ki Ageng Pamanahan, a pioneer of the Mataram Dynasty, a role model, and the half-brother of Sultan Adiwijaya, better known as Adiwijaya of Pajang.

Currently, the brand name Manahan is known as the name of a sub-district and a sports complex located in Banjarsari, Surakarta, Central Java. The sub-district is located near Solo Balapan.

== History ==
=== Introduction ===
The Manahan train is a rebranding of the Argo Lawu Facultative and Argo Dwipangga Facultative train services with the Solo Balapan–Gambir route, which have been operating since 2016. Both are facultative services, meaning they only operate on certain days, using light steel executive train sets.

=== Manahan (2013-Present) ===
After undergoing rebranding in the enactment of new train travel chart 2023, the Manahan train began operating on 1 June 2023, but still has facultative status, which means it only operates on certain days. However, due to high demand, the Manahan train operates every day.

In the enactment of new train travel chart 2025, which will take effect on 1 February 2025, the Manahan train will change its status to a regular train, while the Additional Manahan train will be transferred to the Batavia train service. The Manahan train operates using a first generation stainless steel type train, which is a former series of Taksaka and Bima.

== List of the Station ==
On 1 February 2025, the Manahan train was changed that begin from facultative to regular service.

- Gambir (Start/End)
- Jatinegara (only bound from Solo Balapan)
- Bekasi
- Cikarang
- Cirebon
- Purwokerto
- Kroya
- Kebumen
- Kutoarjo
- Yogyakarta
- Klaten
- Solo Balapan (Start/End)

== Incident ==
- On 15 February 2024, the 79A Manahan train's locomotive heading to Gambir experienced a derailment after hitting a sand truck at a level crossing at km 261+2 of the road between Ketanggungan–Ciledug, precisely in Tanjung, Brebes, Central Java. In this incident, two people consisting of a father and son who were in the truck died. Then the CC 203 01 07 locomotive suffered minor damage to the front. This incident caused disruption to the Cirebon–Prupuk railway line downstream.

== See also ==
- Argo Lawu
- Argo Dwipangga
- Lodaya
