= Gambir railway station =

Railway station in Indonesia

Gambir Stasiun Gambir
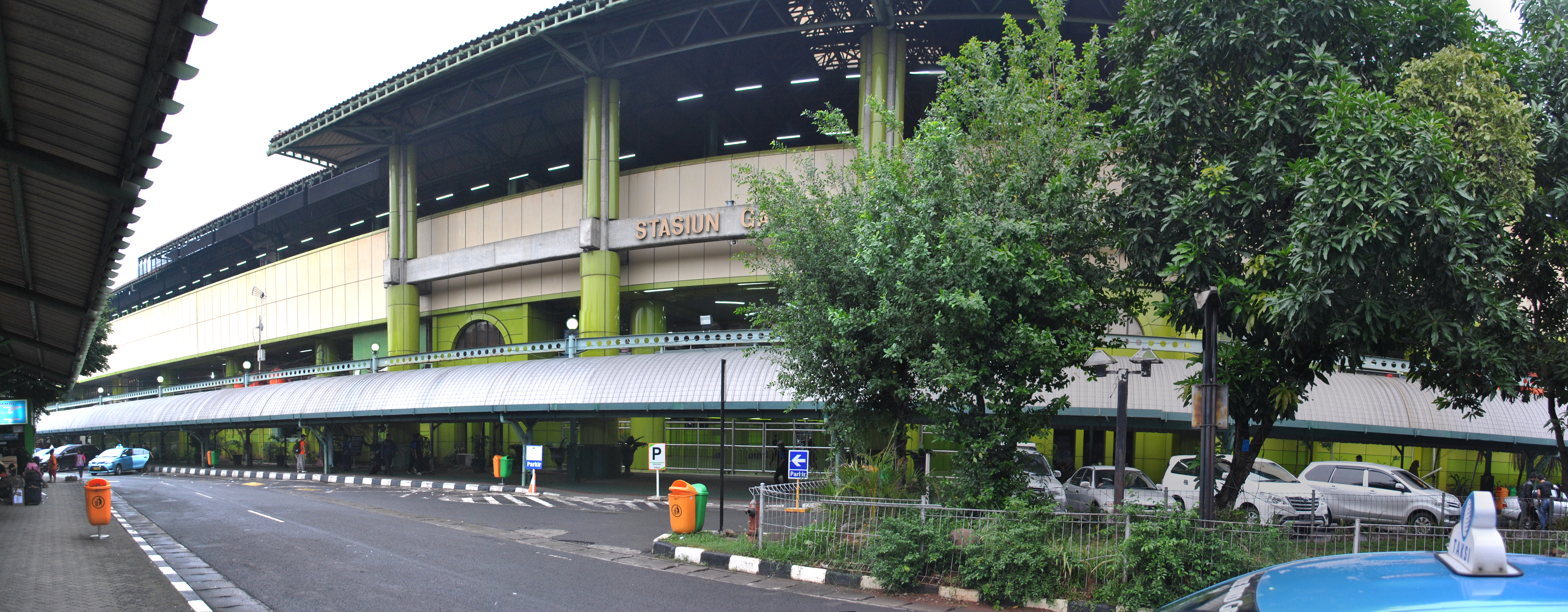
- Panoramic view of Gambir railway station's entrance.

General information
- Location: Jl. Medan Merdeka Timur No. 1, Gambir, Gambir, Central Jakarta; Jakarta; Indonesia
- Coordinates: 6°10′36″S 106°49′50″E
- Elevation: +16 m (52 ft)
- System: Inter-city rail station
- Owner: Kereta Api Indonesia
- Operator: Kereta Api Indonesia
- Platforms: Double island platforms
- Tracks: 4
- Connections: Gambir; Gambir 2

Construction
- Structure type: Elevated
- Parking: Available
- Accessible: Available

Other information
- Station code: GMR • 0430
- Classification: Large type A

History
- Opened: 15 September 1871; 155 years ago
- Rebuilt: 1992
- Former names: Koningsplein Halt; Weltevreden Station
- Original company: Dutch East Indies Railway Company

Services
Southern Java Lines: Parahyangan (train) (regular & additional), Papandayan and Pangandaran.
Central Java Lines: Purwojaya, Taksaka, Argo Lawu, Argo Dwipangga, Manahan, Argo Semeru, Bima, Gajayana, Cakrabuana train, Batavia train.
Northern Java Lines: Cirebon train (facultative), Argo Anjasmoro, Gunungjati train, Argo Sindoro, Argo Muria, Argo Merbabu, Argo Bromo Anggrek, Sembrani, Brawijaya and Pandalungan.
| Preceding station | Following station |
|---|---|
Bogor Commuter Line does not stop here
Route map
Location
- Location within Jakarta

Gambir Station (Indonesian: Stasiun Gambir, station code: GMR) is a major railway station in Gambir, Gambir, Central Jakarta, Jakarta, Indonesia. The station is located on the eastern side of Merdeka Square and the western side of the Pramuka Movement headquarters and Immanuel Church. It is operated by the KAI.

During the Dutch East Indies era, the station's name was Weltevreden Station, which later changed its name to Batavia Koningsplein Station after repairs were made in the 1930s. In the 1950s, its name was changed again to its current name, and major repairs were carried out to become an elevated station from 1988 to 1992.

Currently, Gambir Station serves as a terminus for most intercity trains operating across Java Island. One of Jakarta's main commuter lines, the Commuterline Bogor Line (to Bogor) passes through this station but has not stopped here since 2012. There are however, plans to reactivate the station as a stop for the commuters, due to the high volume of passengers that board and exit from Gambir's neighboring-commuter-only stations (Gondangdia and Juanda station). Originally, only executive and business class trains used Gambir Station, while all economy class trains and some executive and business class trains used Pasar Senen railway station instead. Since ca. 2016, the norm has changed when KAI introduced new types of economy class coaches in higher class trains e.g. Argo Parahyangan, in line with plans to gradually abolish business class trains.

== History ==
=== Ground-level station (1871-1992) ===
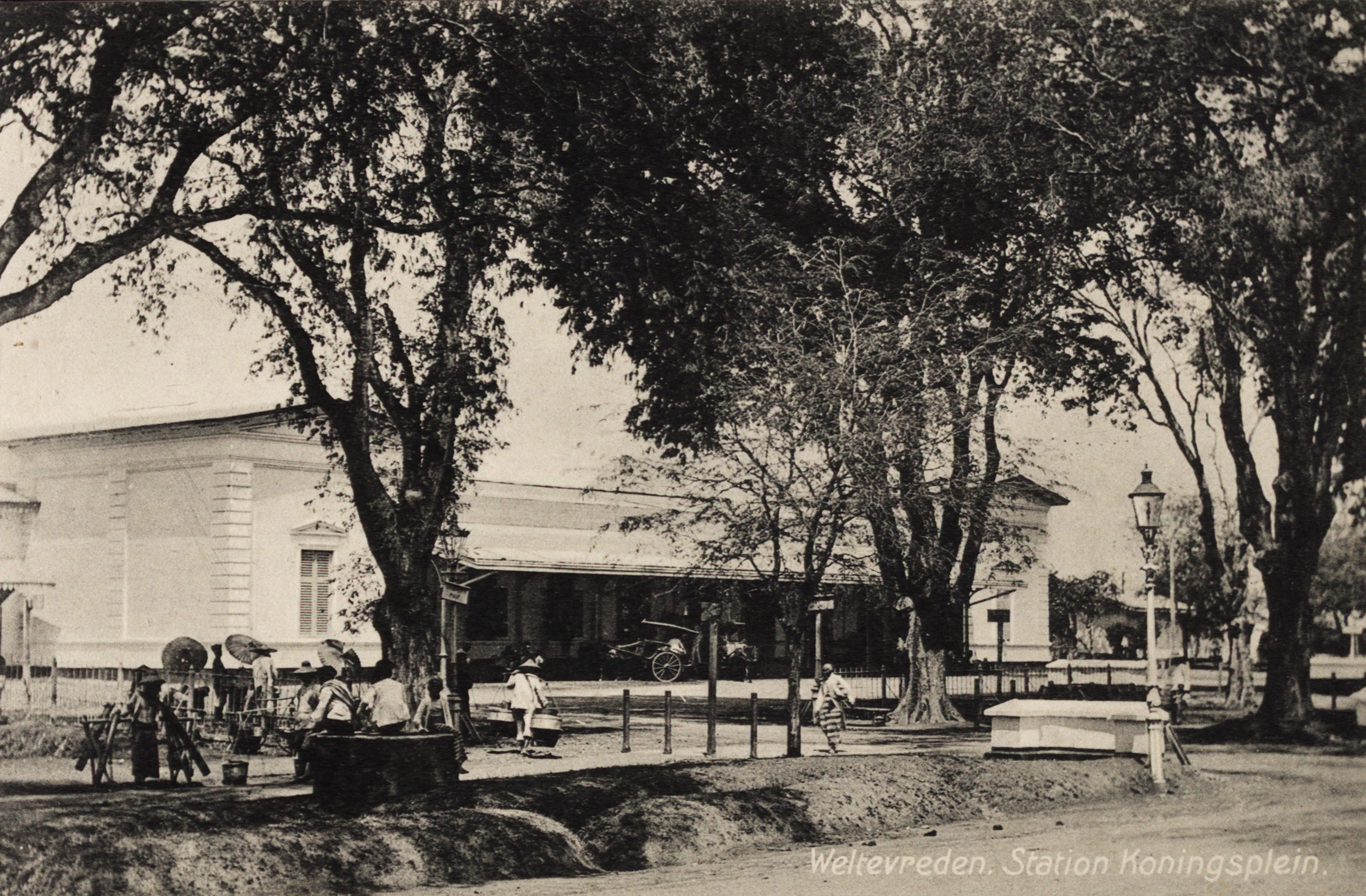
The Koningsplein/Weltevreden NIS station with Indische/Neoclassic architectural style

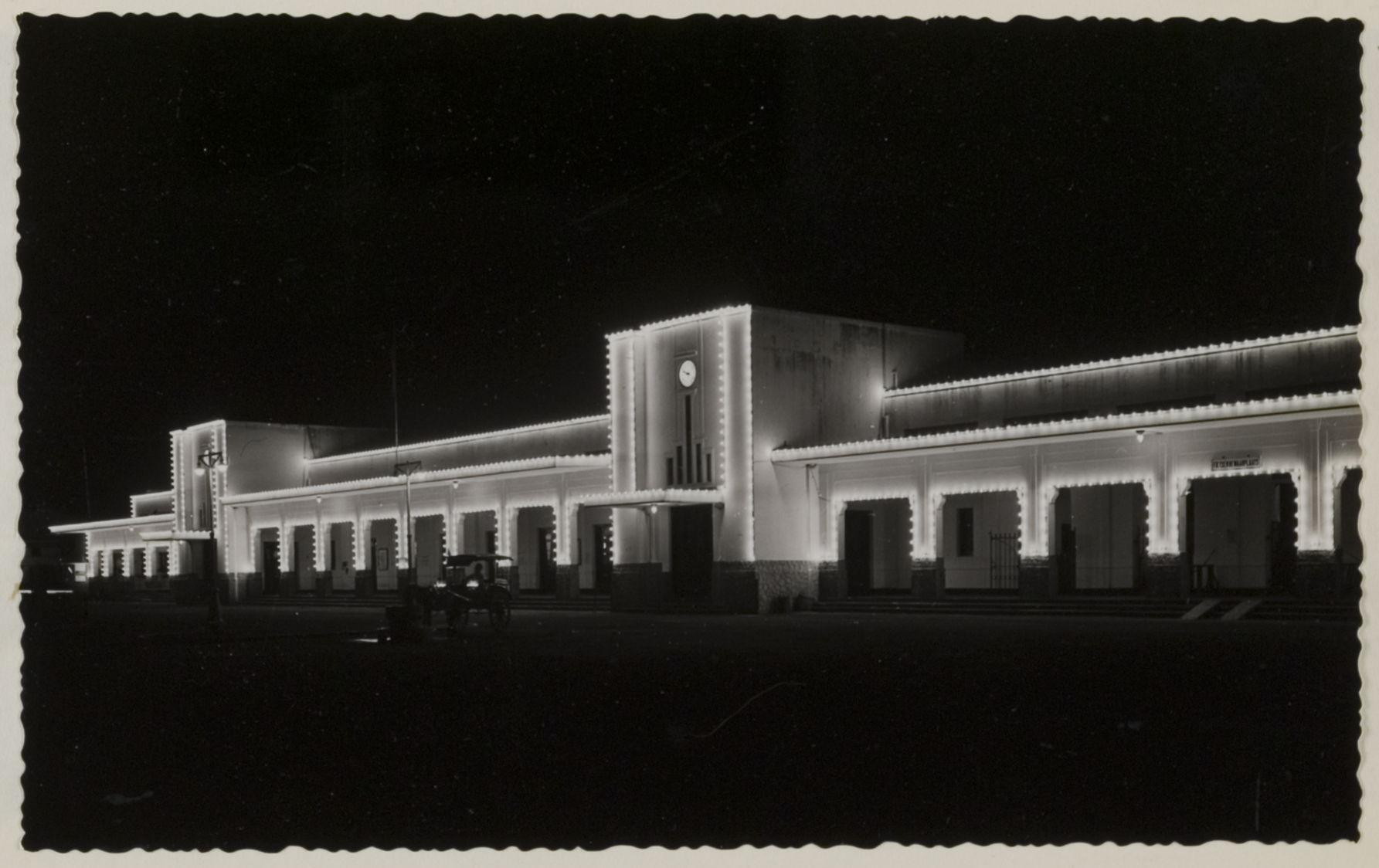
The Batavia-Koningsplein Station in 1930 after its renovation with Art Deco style building

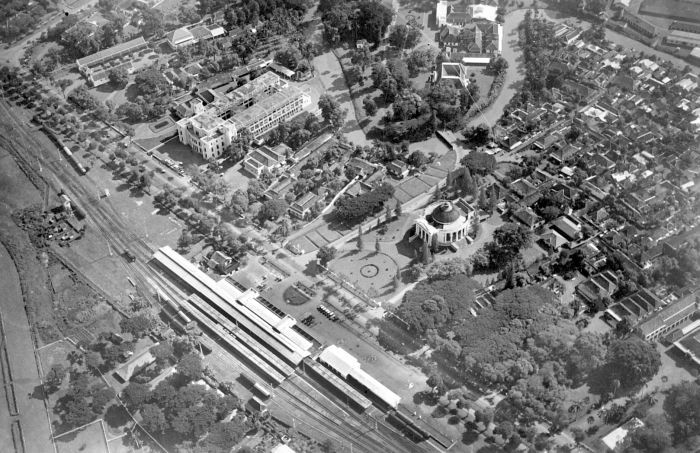
Aerial view of Gambir Station in 1940

Gambir Station is located on the Batavia–Weltevreden section, the first section of the Batavia–Buitenzorg railway line which was inaugurated by the Nederlandsch-Indische Spoorweg Maatschappij (NIS). At its opening, the line stretched from near the old Sunda Kelapa port and south to what is now the Gambir area.

At first, Gambir station was thought to be a small railway stop (halte Koningsplein) which was inaugurated on September 16, 1871, simultaneously with the opening of the line's first section. The small and simple stop was situated on the southeast border of the Koningsplein. It was the southernmost stop of Batavia until 1873 when the line was extended to Meester Cornelis and Buitenzorg.

The stop was later replaced by the larger and permanent Weltevreden Station, which opened on 4 October 1884 in the current location of Gambir Station. Until 1906, the station was used to depart passengers for Bandung and Surabaya. Its building had a roof supported on cast iron bearings in a match with the Staatsspoorwegen (SS) design, according to a statement in 1881. It was designed in the neoclassical style which was popular in the 19th century. Until then the NIS had not placed roofs of this type, while the SS had placed them in several places.

In 1928 Weltevreden Station was renovated in Art Deco style. In 1937 the station was changed to Batavia Koningsplein Station and after Indonesian independence, it was changed again to Jakarta Gambir Station. The station did not change its form after Indonesian independence until 1971 because it was significantly extended in the same year.

=== Elevated station and future developments (1992-present) ===
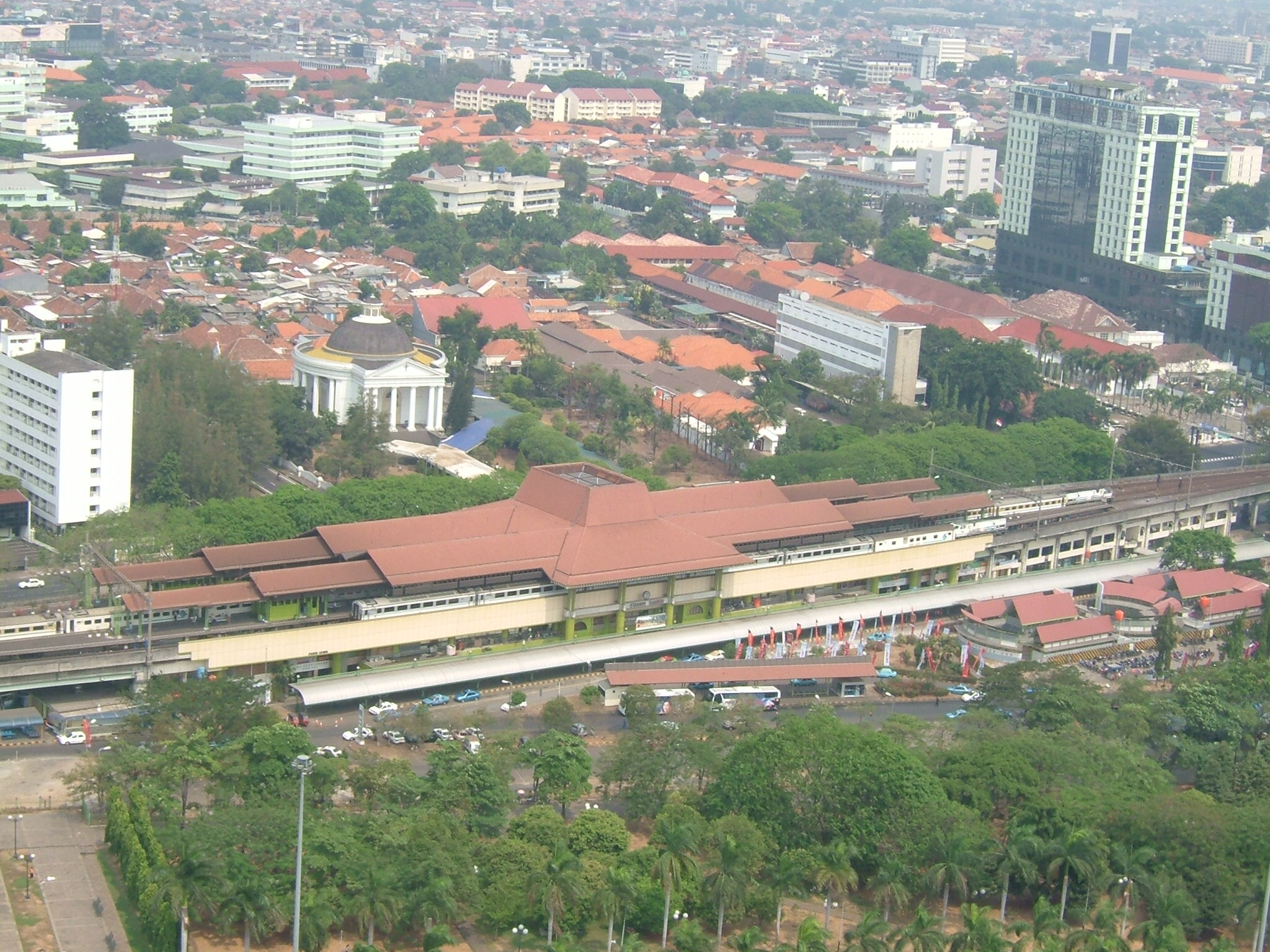
Aerial view of Gambir Station from the National Monument.

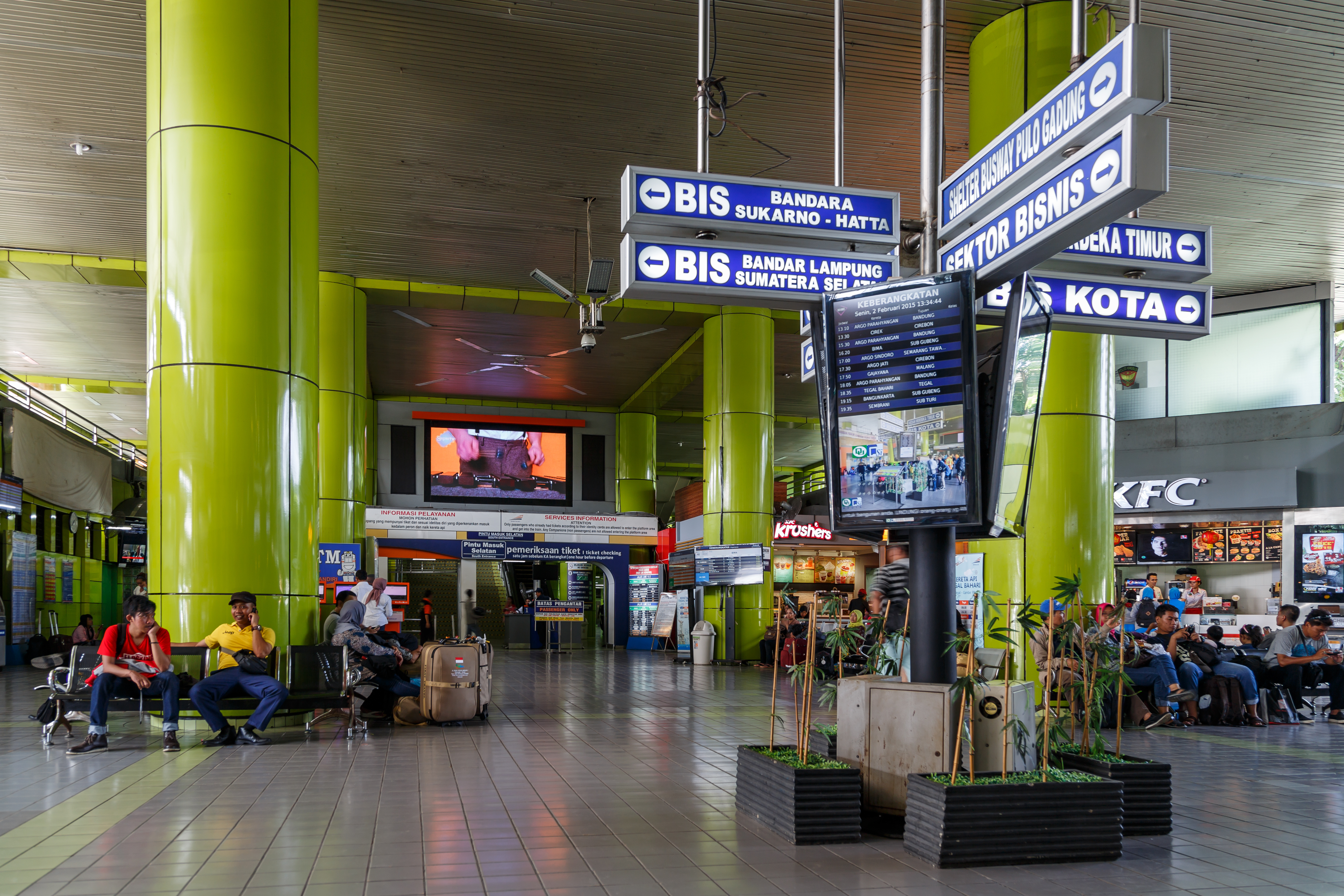
Interior view of Gambir Station.

In February 1988, at the same time as the construction of the Jakarta Kota–Manggarai elevated railway, the old Art Deco station building from the Dutch East Indies era was demolished and replaced with a new building which still exists today. On 5 June 1992, President Soeharto along with First Lady Siti Hartinah and government officials inaugurated the new Gambir Station by boarding the EMU train from Gambir Station to Jakarta Kota Station.

There were 4 tracks at Gambir Station when it became an elevated line, and the station building is completely modern with a joglo architectural style and a lime green ceramic facade. The facade color has not changed, only the platform poles have been recolored into moss green. The project spent Rp432.5 billion and was not fully completed when it was inaugurated so it was able to fully operate a year later. After the construction was finished, the railway track below began to be removed and the area which was originally the old station yard had turned into a car park starting in 1994.

Based on the master plan made by the Indonesian Ministry of Transportation, Gambir Station is planned to be a Commuterline-only station. The master plan resurfaced when Manggarai Station was planned to be used as the terminus for non-KRL Commuterline passenger trains, to reduce the density of passenger train queues on the elevated railway which sometimes disrupts KRL Commuterline trips. As a result of this plan, the Ministry of Transportation decided to separate the KRL Commuterline and other rail lines after the Manggarai Station construction was completed. By its completion as the central station, all long/medium-distance passenger trains that terminate at Gambir Station will be moved to Manggarai Station in 2025.

Starting in February 2022, the SSI-type old electric signaling system produced by Siemens along with the Jakarta Kota–Manggarai elevated track has been replaced with the newest one produced by Len Industri.

== Building layout and facilities ==
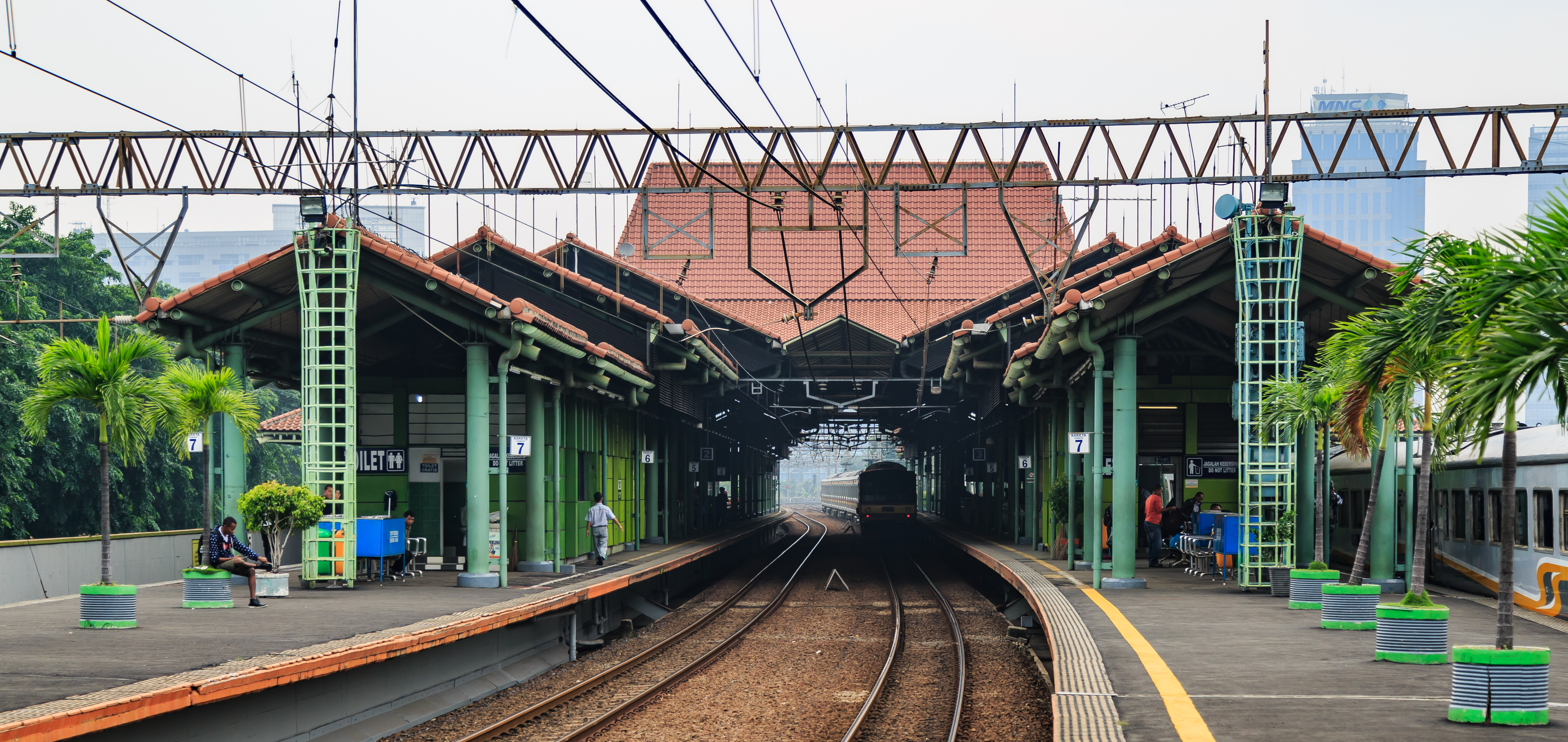
Main platform of Gambir station

The platform of Gambir Station old building in 1986 before it was rebuilt elevated

Like other Manggarai–Jakarta Kota elevated stations, work on the station was done by Inti Era Cipta, a consortium formed by Encona Engineering, Wiratman, PT Chandra Wahana Raya and PT Asianenco. The project also involved 3 Japanese firms: Pacific Consultant International, Japan Transportation Consultants, and Japan Electrical Consulting.

Manggarai-Jakarta Kota elevated stations were designed with post-modernism, incorporating hi-tech aesthetics with local traditional architecture. Stations were designed with bright colors to serve as local landmarks for the area, and also for easy recognition. Columns on the station were placed to allow views toward the National Monument from Jl. Medan Merdeka Timur. The station is colored green specifically to conform with the nearby Taman Medan Merdeka.

Gambir Station has four railway tracks, with tracks 2 and 3 being straight. After Eid al-Fitr 2012, the station was no longer used as a Commuterline stop, and its passengers were diverted to either Gondangdia or Juanda stations.

The Gambir Station current building consists of three floors. The main hall, counters, restaurants, shops, and ATMs are on the first floor. The second floor is the waiting area with several fast food restaurants and cafeterias, while the platforms and rail tracks are on the third floor. Announcements are made in Indonesian and English.

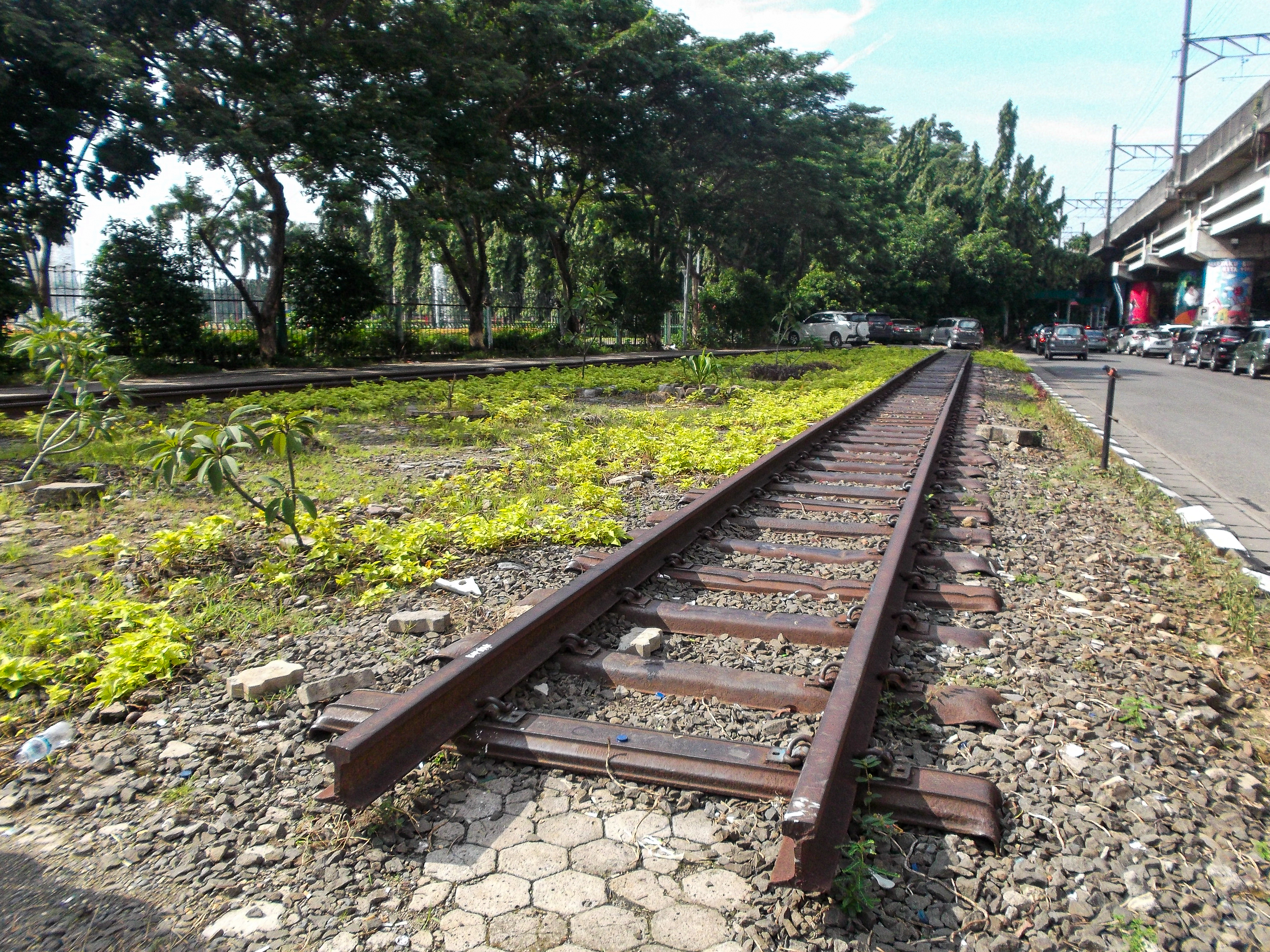
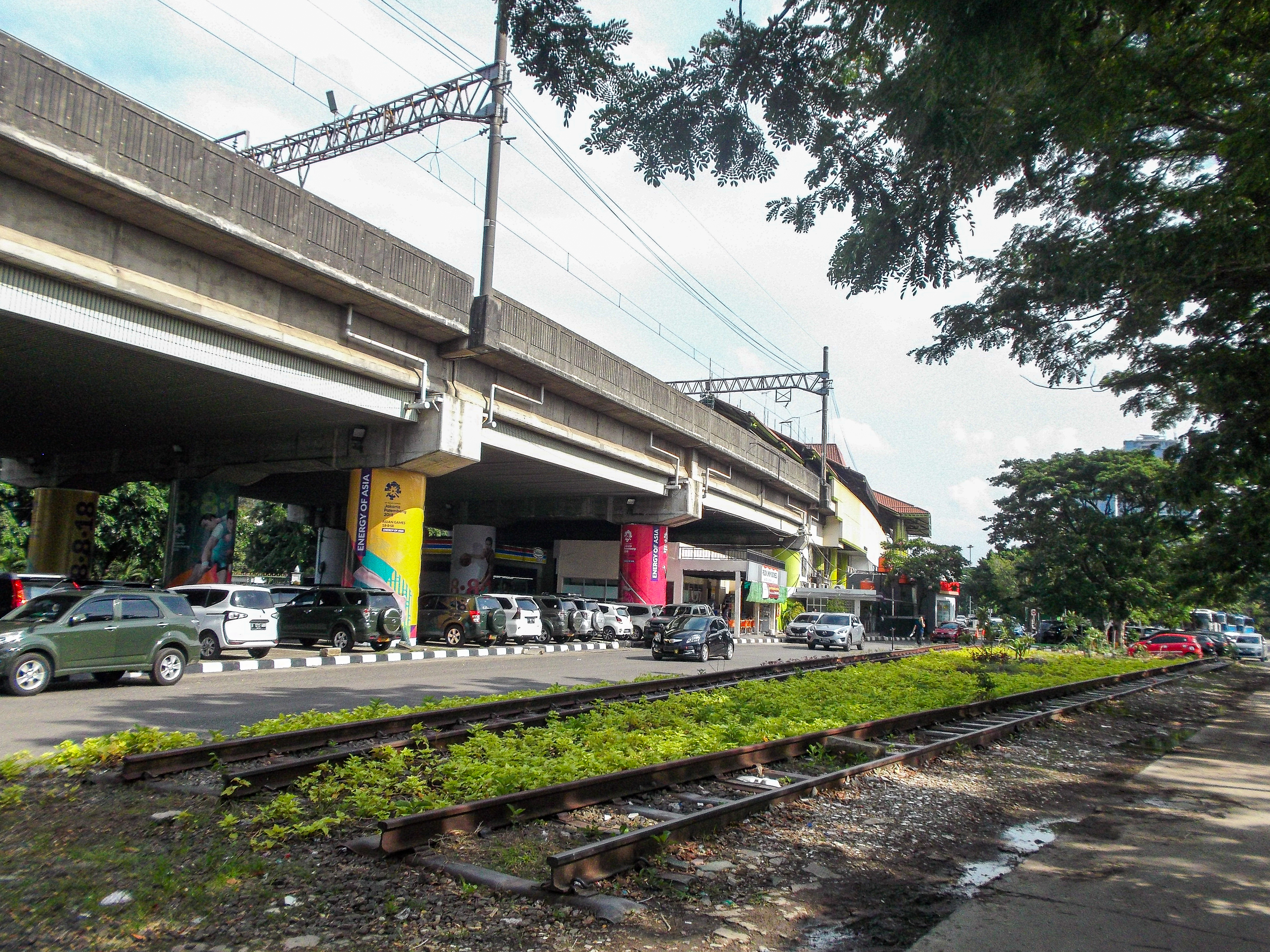
Old tracks were reinstalled on the original site of Gambir Station prior to 1992 renovation. A restaurant using former Rheostatic EMU rolling stock was planned above the reinstalled old tracks.

When Ignasius Jonan served as the president and director of KAI, it was planned to build a restaurant using original train units in the parking area. The planned tracks have been installed, and it is planned to use the 1978 class of the former Rheostatic EMU unit from Purwakarta Station as the restaurant. The unit was separated from other unused commuter trains and stored in Purwakarta locomotive depot because it was planned to be brought to Gambir Station. However, the plan was never realized, only the tracks were installed. The Rheostatic EMU unit chosen for the restaurant plan was also never brought and ended up being scrapped like other unused Rheostatic EMU units. The former rail track was still visible as of 2018 until it was finally demolished.

Gambir Station is now equipped with a Rail Transit Suite, a special transit hotel for train passengers.

== Services ==
The following is a list of train services at the Gambir Station

=== Intercity Trains ===
- Argo Anjasmoro from and to Surabaya Pasarturi (8 stainless steel executive class)
- Anggrek from and to Surabaya Pasar Turi (2 compartment suites class + 8 newgen executive class)
- Argo Dwipangga from and to Solo Balapan (2 luxury class + 8 newgen executive class)
- Argo Lawu from and to Solo Balapan (2 luxury class + 8 newgen executive class)
- Argo Merbabu from and to Semarang Tawang Bank Jateng (9 executive class)
- Argo Muria from and to Semarang Tawang (9 newgen executive class)
- Argo Semeru from and to Surabaya Gubeng (1 compartment suites class + 9 newgen executive class)
- Argo Sindoro to Semarang Tawang (9 newgen executive class)
- Cirebon train to Cirebon and Tegal
- Batavia from and to Solo Balapan (4 newgen executive class + 4 newgen economy class)
- Bima from and to Surabaya Gubeng (1 compartment suites class + 9 newgen executive class)
- Brawijaya from and to Malang (8 executive class)
- Cakrabuana from and to either Cirebon and Purwokerto (4 executive class + 5 new image premium economy class)
- Gajayana to Malang (1 luxury class + 8 stainless steel executive class)
- Gunung Jati from and to either Cirebon and Semarang Tawang (4 executive class + 5 new image premium economy class)
- Manahan from and to Solo Balapan (8 stainless steel executive class)
- Pandalungan to Jember (8 stainless steel executive class)
- Pangandaran from and to Banjar (1 panoramic class + 3 stainless steel executive class + 4 stainless steel premium economy class)
- Papandayan from and to Garut (1 panoramic class + 3 stainless steel executive class + 4 stainless steel premium economy class)
- Parahyangan from and to Bandung
  - 1 luxury class + 8 stainless steel executive class + 1 dining
  - 8 stainless steel executive class
  - 1 panoramic class + 3 stainless steel executive class + 4 stainless steel premium economy class
- Purwojaya from and to Cilacap (9 executive class)
- Sembrani from and to Surabaya Pasar Turi (2 luxury class + 8 stainless steel executive class)
- Taksaka from and to Yogyakarta (3 luxury class + 7 newgen executive class)

=== Commuter Rail ===
The Bogor Line passes through but skips the station since 2013, due to the station's busy intercity schedule. Commuter train passengers must use either Juanda or Gondangdia station and then other modes of transport to reach Gambir station. However, the station is planned to be served by Commuterline services again by 2028.

== Supporting transportation ==
=== DAMRI bus ===
DAMRI buses from Gambir Station to Soekarno–Hatta International Airport run every day from 01:00 until 21:00. The ticket price is Rp 40000.

=== City transport ===
Many local modes of transport service Gambir Station, including buses, minibuses, taxis, bajaj, and TransJakarta. All transportation lines noted are no more than 500 meters from the station.

==== TransJakarta ====
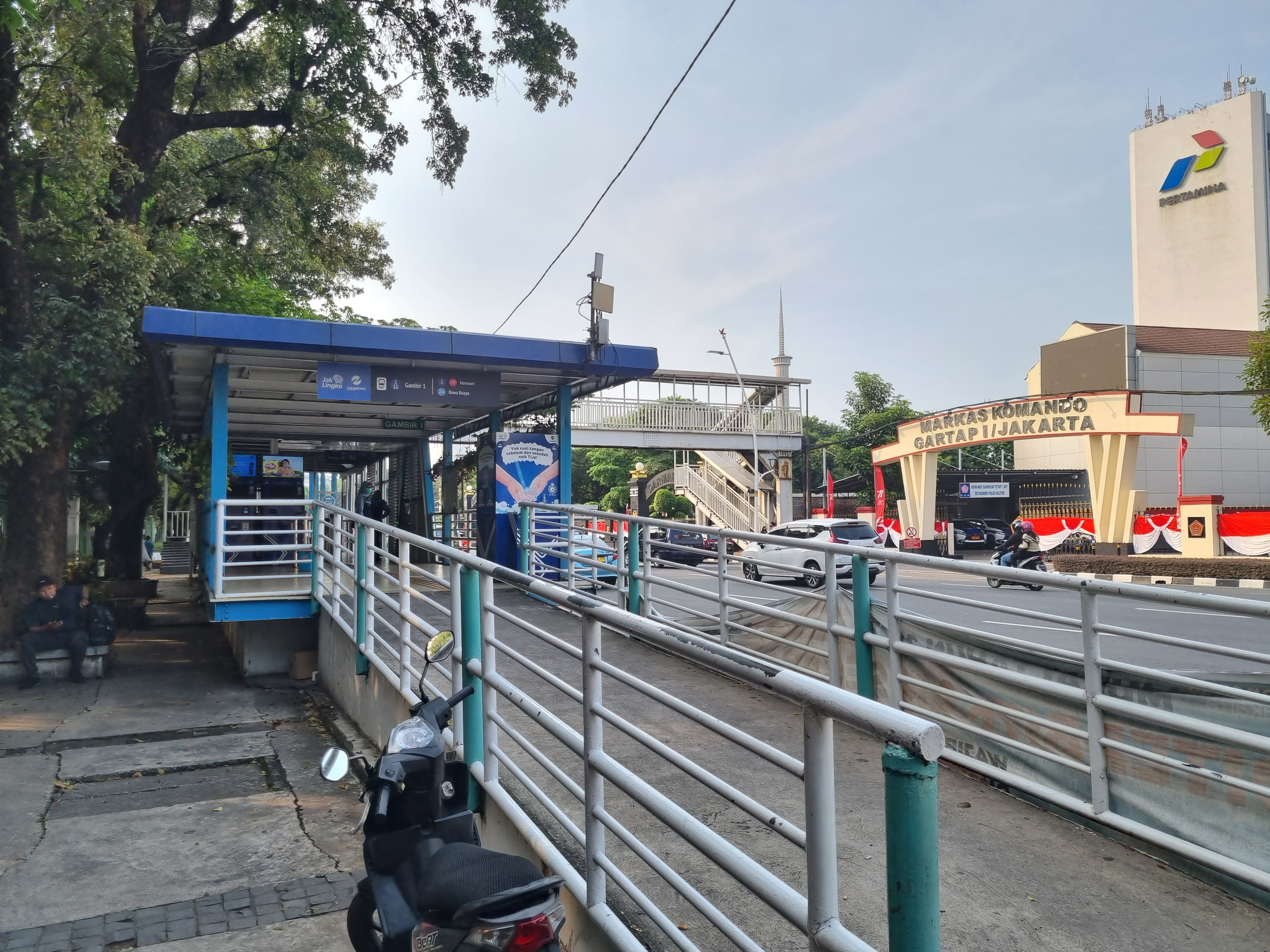
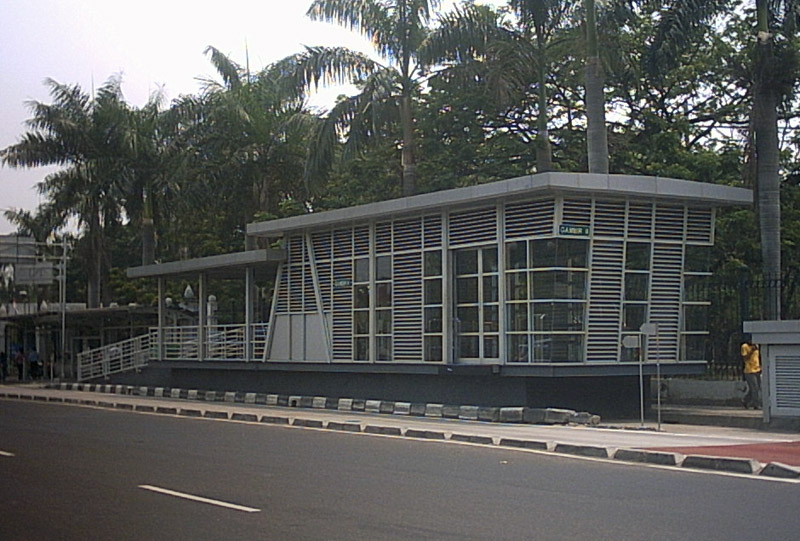
Two TransJakarta BRT stations near Gambir Station, namely Gambir (above) and Gambir 2 (below).

There are two main TransJakarta bus stations near Gambir Station, which are Gambir and Gambir 2. Aside from that, there are several feeder stops near the station.

Gambir serve routes:

- Corridor 2 towards Monas

Gambir 2 serve routes:

- Corridor 2 towards Pulogadung
- Corridor 2A towards Pulogadung

Feeder routes near the station:

- Corridor 1P (Senen - Bundaran Senayan) both direction
- Corridor 1R (Senen - Tanah Abang) towards Tanah Abang
- Corridor 2P (Gondangdia - Senen) towards Senen
- Corridor 2Q (Gondangdia - Balaikota)
- Corridor 5M (Kampung Melayu - Tanah Abang via Cikini) towards Tanah Abang
- Corridor 6H (Senen - Lebak Bulus) both direction

==== Regular Bus ====
- AJA.P P106 (Senen - Cimone)
- DSU P157 (Senen - Poris Plawad)
- Mayasari Bakti P14 (Tanah Abang - Tanjung Priok)
- MetroMini P15 (Senen - Setiabudi)
- Kopaja T502 (Tanah Abang - Kampung Melayu)

== Gallery ==
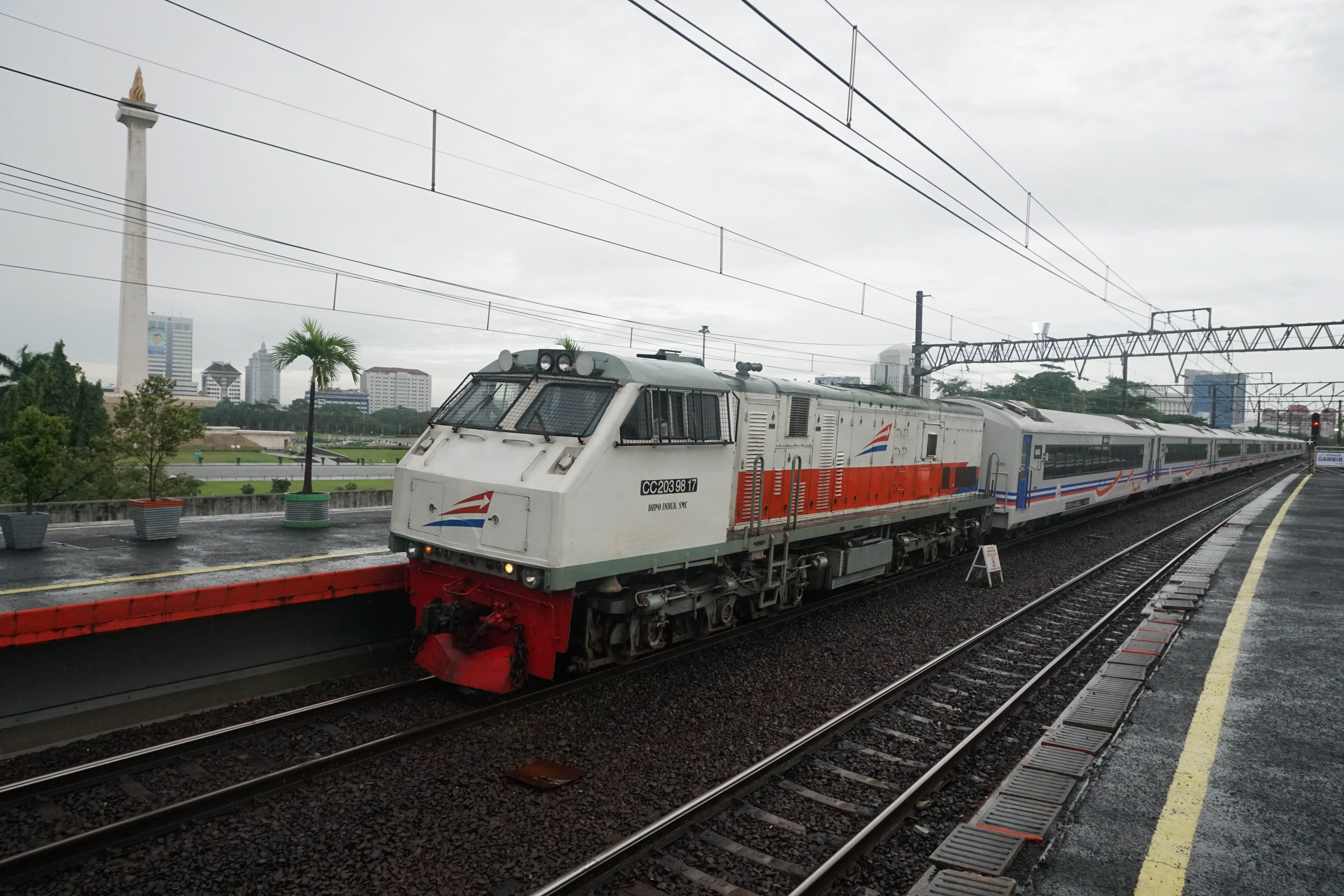
The Argo Jati train arriving at Gambir Station on platform 3 from the north

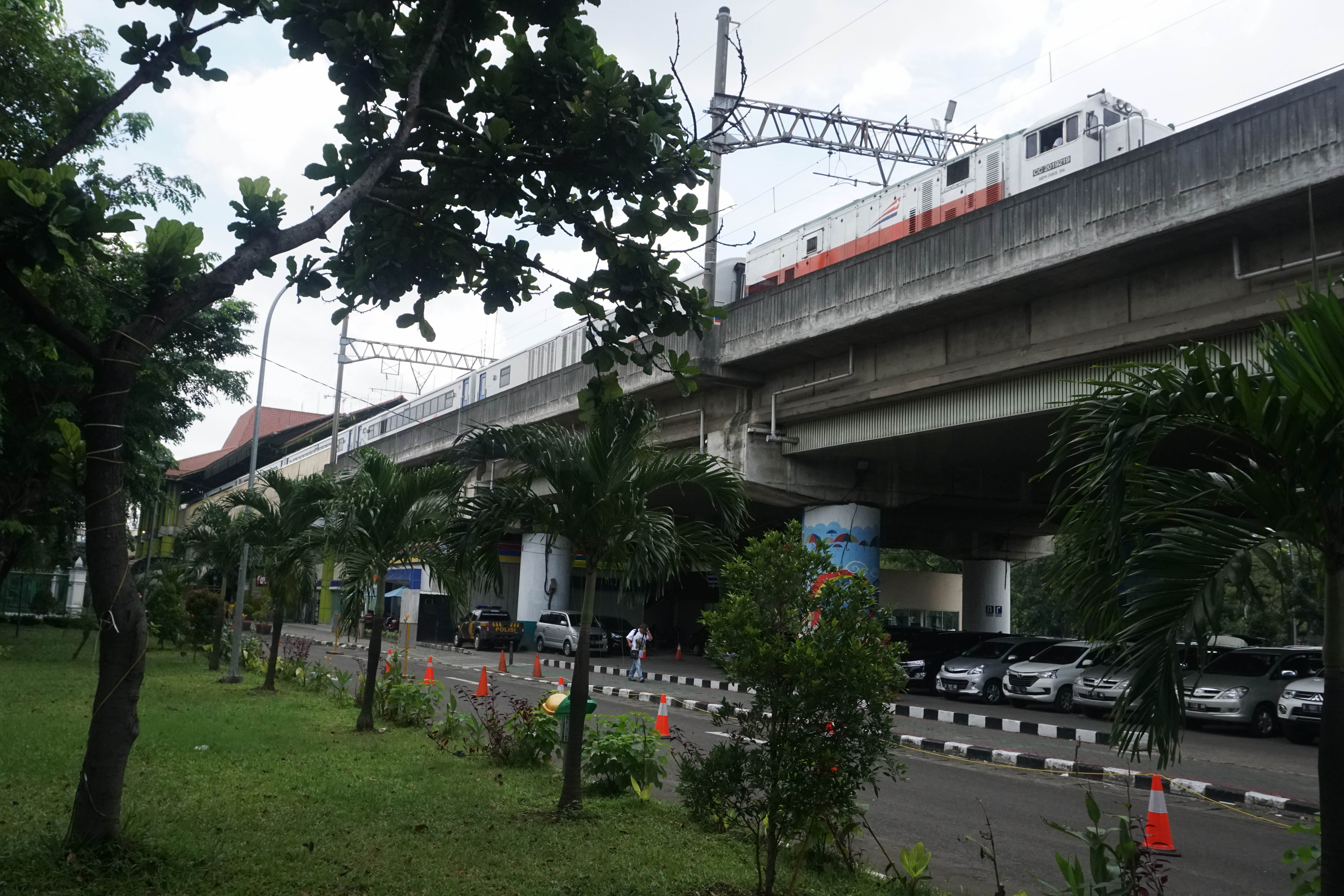
Argo Jati Fakultatif train at the Gambir Station

== See also ==
- Rail transport in Indonesia

== Works cited ==
- Merrillees, Scott (2012). Greetings from Jakarta: Postcards of a Capital 1900-1950. Equinox Publishing. ISBN 9789793780887.

| Preceding station | Kereta Api Indonesia | Following station |
|---|---|---|
| Juanda towards Jakarta Kota | Jakarta Kota–Manggarai | Gondangdia towards Manggarai |
