= Ceper railway station =

Railway station in Indonesia

Y07 Ceper Station Stasiun Ceper
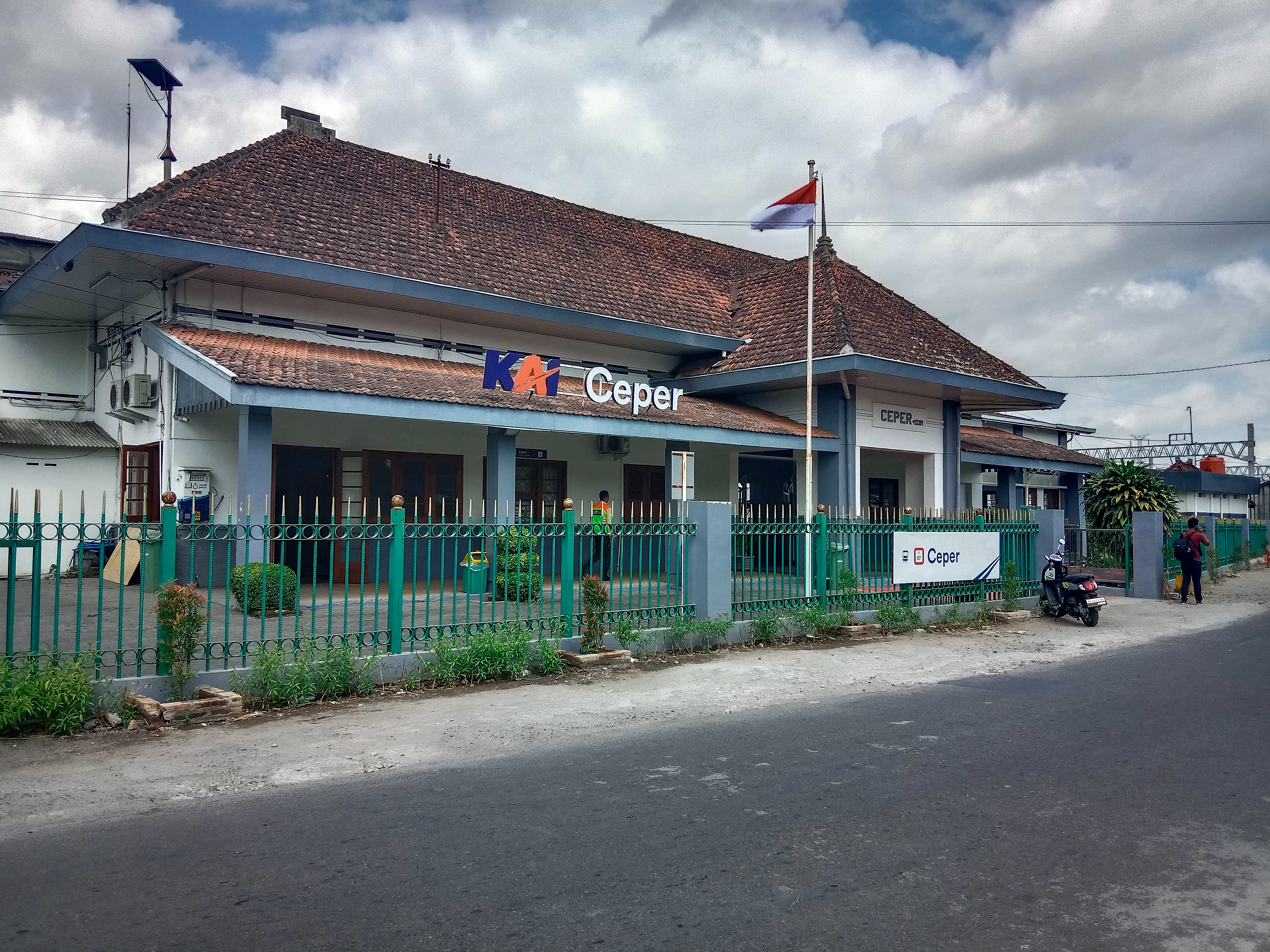
- Station entrance, 2025.

General information
- Location: Klepu, Ceper, Klaten Regency; Central Java; Indonesia
- Coordinates: 7.6688517°S 110.6748613°E
- Elevation: +133 m (436 ft)
- Owner: Kereta Api Indonesia
- Operator: KAI Commuter
- Lines: Yogyakarta Line; Kutoarjo–Purwosari–Solo Balapan
- Platforms: 1 side platform 2 island platforms
- Tracks: 5

Construction
- Structure type: Ground
- Parking: Available
- Accessible: Available

Other information
- Station code: CE • 3112
- Classification: Class II

History
- Opened: 1871
- Electrified: 2020
- Former names: Tjepper Station

Services
| Preceding station | | Following station |
|---|---|---|
| Klaten towards Yogyakarta | Yogyakarta Line | Delanggu towards Palur |
Location
- Location within Java

Ceper Station (CE) is a class II railway station located in Klepu, Ceper, Klaten Regency; at an altitude of +133 meters, including in the Operational Area VI Yogyakarta.

Since the operation of the Yogyakarta–Solo double tracks Srowot–Ketandan segment in 2001 and completed on the Brambanan–Delanggu segment on 15 December 2003, this station has five railway tracks with lines 2 and 3 being straight lines and line 5 as parking for freight trains.

To support the double tracks operation, the mechanical signaling system at this station was replaced with an electric signaling system made by PT Len Industri which had been installed since 2013 and then began operating on 12 February 2019.

To the west of this station, before Klaten Station, there is Ketandan Station which has been inactive since the Kutoarjo–Solo double tracks operates. In addition, from this station there is a branching line to the Ceper Baru sugar factory now been deactivated.

Starting 10 February 2021, to coincide with the launch of the 2021 train travel chart, this station together with three other stations (Delanggu Station, Gawok Station, and Srowot Station) began serving KRL Commuterline across Yogyakarta–Solo Balapan.

== Station layout ==
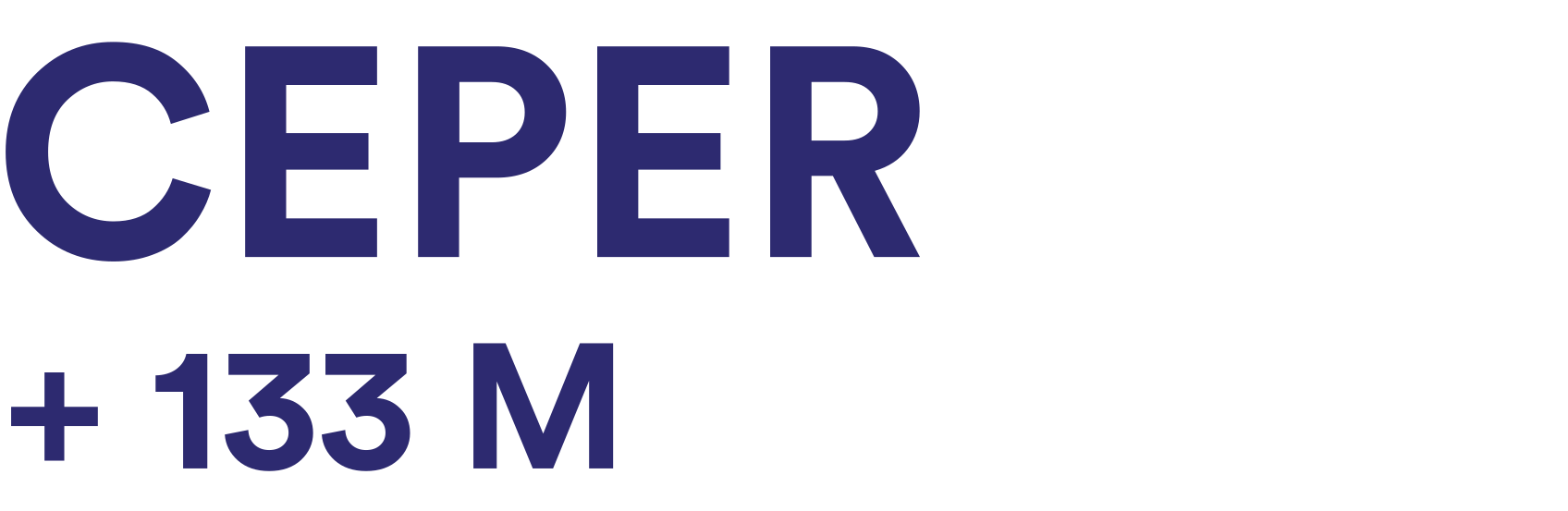
Y07
G
Main building
P
Platform floor
Side platform, the doors are opened on the right side
Line 1
Additional stop line
Island platform
Line 2
← (Klaten) Yogyakarta Line to Yogyakarta

Straight tracks to Yogyakarta

Island platform
Line 3
Yogyakarta Line to Solo Balapan (Delanggu) →

Straight tracks to Solo Balapan

Line 4
Additional stop line
Line 5
Pusri warehouse line

== Services ==
The following is a list of train services at the Ceper Station.

- KRL Commuterline
  - Yogyakarta Line, to Yogyakarta, Solo Balapan, and Palur

| Preceding station | Kereta Api Indonesia | Following station |
|---|---|---|
| Ketandan towards Kutoarjo | Kutoarjo–Purwosari–Solo Balapan | Delanggu towards Solo Balapan |
