= Yogyakarta–Solo Balapan railway =

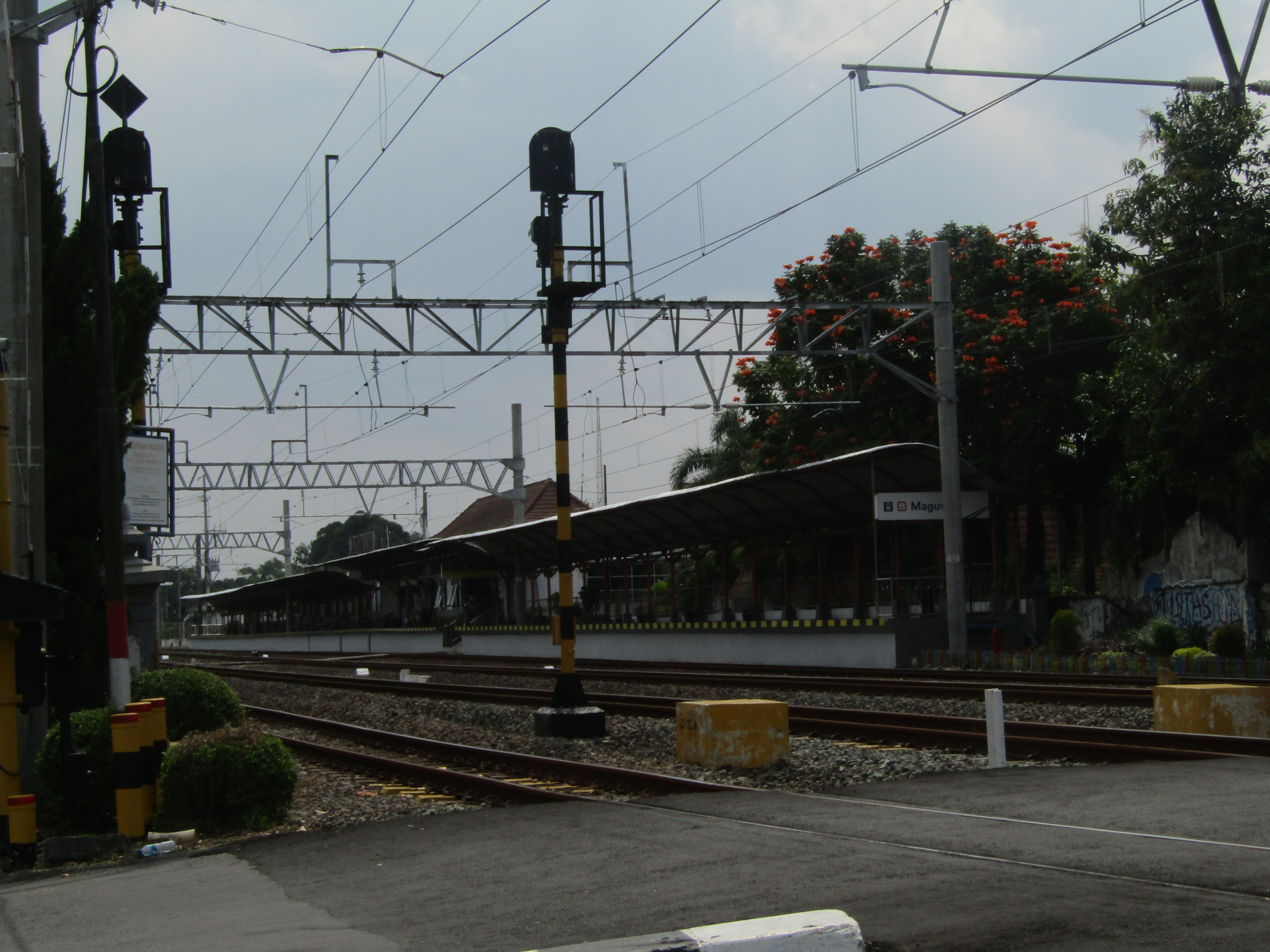
- Maguwo in the Yogya-Solo railway line

Overview
- Native name: Jalur kereta api Yogyakarta–Solo Balapan
- Status: Operational
- Owner: Directorate General of Railways (DJKA)
- Locale: Yogyakarta, Special Region of Yogyakarta - Surakarta, Central Java
- Termini: Yogyakarta; Solo Balapan
- Stations: 13

Service
- Type: Inter-city rail and Commuter rail
- Operator(s): PT Kereta Api Indonesia and KAI Commuter

History
- Opened: 1929

Technical
- Num of tracks: 2
- Track gauge: 1,067 mm (3 ft 6 in)
- Electrification: 1.5 kV DC OHC

The Yogyakarta–Solo Balapan railway is a corridor railway line in Southern Java, which has a length of 60 km (37 mi). This railway line is a part of Operation Area VI Yogyakarta and the southern Java rail line.

This line stretches from west to east, serving passenger and freight trains connecting Jakarta and its metropolitan area and West Java, Central Java, DI Yogyakarta, and East Java via the southern route of Java Island, although the main route of Jakarta–Surabaya is the northern route of Java via Semarang.

On the Yogyakarta–Surakarta segment, there are many tourist attractions, especially in the area around Prambanan Temple and between Klaten and Delanggu with the view of the nearby mountains.

== History ==
=== Introduction ===
In 1929, Staatsspoorwegen (SS) officially opened from Solo to Yogyakarta as a section from the Brumbung-Yogyakarta railway line. Since 2021, this line as a busiest railway line for Jakarta, Bandung, and Surabaya route, also with the KAI Commuter Yogyakarta Line. In addition, this railway line has a bridge in Yogyakarta named as the Kewek railway bridge.

=== Yogyakarta-Solo railway double track ===
Beginning in 2001, this line was gradually upgraded to a double track, starting with the Srowot railway station to Ketandan railway station segment, which was soon continued to the Brambanan railway station to Delanggu railway station segment. Subsequently, construction continued westward and eastward. According to the Director General of Land Transportation at that time, Iskandar Abubakar, said during an inspection at Gawok railway station on the afternoon of 2 August 2002, that this line was indeed built to improve the smoothness of trains on the southern corridor. Meanwhile, Sutrisno, who at that time served as the Head of the Yogyakarta Railway Operational Project, said that the capacity of the Yogyakarta–Solo line when it was still a single track was 64 lines per day, while the number of trains passing through reached 90 per day. With this double track, he hoped that the capacity could increase to 128 lines per day. The date for the double track switch-over is:

- Srowot–Ketandan, in 2001.
- Brambanan–Srowot and Ketandan–Delanggu, on 15 December 2003. Inaugurated by the then Minister of Transportation, Agum Gumelar, marked by an inscription that is now placed at Brambanan Station.
- Brambanan–Maguwo, Delanggu–Gawok, and Solo Balapan–Gawok, in 2004.
- Maguwo–Lempuyangan, on 9 January 2007.

Due to budget constraints, this double-track line still uses mechanical signalling. However, starting in 2013, stations on the Yogyakarta–Solo line began installing electrical signals manufactured by Len Industri. This signal was only turned on at the end of 2015 for the Delanggu–Purwosari route and was recorded in KAI assets in 2016. From October 2018 to February 2019, the signal that had not been active was finally turned on.

Regarding the line development plan, the Directorate General of Railways (DJKA) has decided to electrify this line for the Yogyakarta–Solo segment, in connection with the planned operation of the Yogyakarta Commuter Line. This discourse has been included in the 2030 National Railway Master Plan (Ripnas). In addition, this electrification is also stated in the Development Matrix of the 2020-2024 National Medium-Term Development Plan. This electrification began to be realized with the presence of overhead electricity poles that were stacked at the former container loading and unloading yard at Solo Jebres railway station.

As of the end of January 2020, overhead power construction had begun for the Yogyakarta–Klaten segment. On 10 February 2021, the electric rail train (KRL) started operating on the Yogyakarta–Solo Balapan segment.

== Service ==
Here's train that passing the Yogyakarta-Solo Balapan railway line:

=== Executive class ===
- Argo Dwipangga, between Gambir and Solo Balapan
- Argo Lawu, between Gambir and Solo Balapan
- Argo Wilis, between Bandung and Surabaya Gubeng
- Argo Semeru, between Gambir and Surabaya Gubeng
- Bima, between Gambir and Surabaya Gubeng
- Manahan, between Gambir and Solo Balapan
- Gajayana, between Gambir and Malang
- Turangga, between Bandung and Surabaya Gubeng

=== Mixed class ===
- Fajar and Senja Utama Solo, between Pasar Senen and Solo Balapan (executive class and premium economy class)
- Lodaya, between Bandung and Solo Balapan (executive class and premium economy class)
- Sancaka, between Yogyakarta & Surabaya Gubeng (executive class and premium economy class)
- Bangunkarta, between Pasar Senen and Jombang (executive class and economy plus class)
- Malabar, between Bandung and Malang (executive class, business class, and economy plus class)
- Mutiara Selatan, between Bandung and Surabaya Gubeng (executive class and premium economy class)
- Kertanegara, between Purwokerto and Malang (executive class and economy plus class)
- Malioboro Express, between Yogyakarta and Malang (executive class and economy plus class)
- Ranggajati, between Cirebon via Yogyakarta-Purwokerto and Jember via Madiun-Jombang-Surabaya Gubeng (executive class and economy class)
- Wijayakusuma, between Cilacap and Ketapang (executive class and premium economy class)
- Sancaka Utara, between Surabaya Pasar Turi and Cilacap (executive class and business class)
- Batavia (train), between Gambir & Solo Balapan (executive and economy)
- Mataram, between Pasar Senen and Solo Balapan
- Gaya Baru Malam Selatan, between Pasar Senen and Surabaya Gubeng
- Singasari, between Pasar Senen and Blitar
- Sangkuriang train, between Bandung and Ketapang

=== Economy class ===
- Jayakarta, between Pasar Senen and Surabaya Gubeng
- Joglosemarkerto, loop line through Central Java and the Special Region of Yogyakarta via Purwokerto
- Logawa, between Purwokerto and Ketapang
- Progo, between Pasar Senen and Lempuyangan
- Bengawan, between Pasar Senen and Purwosari
- Jaka Tingkir, between Pasar Senen and Purwosari
- Kahuripan, between Kiaracondong and Blitar
- Pasundan, between Kiaracondong and Surabaya Gubeng
- Gajahwong, between Pasar Senen and Purwosari

=== Commuter line ===
- KAI Commuter Yogyakarta Line, between Yogyakarta, Solo Balapan, and Palur

=== Freight ===
- Overnight train Service, between Kampung Bandan and Malang (Middle Parcel), between Surabaya Kota and Bandung (Southern Parcel)

== See also ==
- Cilacap–Kroya–Yogyakarta railway
- Yogyakarta
- Surakarta
- Bandung–Surabaya line
