= Klaten railway station =

Railway station in Indonesia

Y06 AS01 JS02 Klaten Station Stasiun Klaten
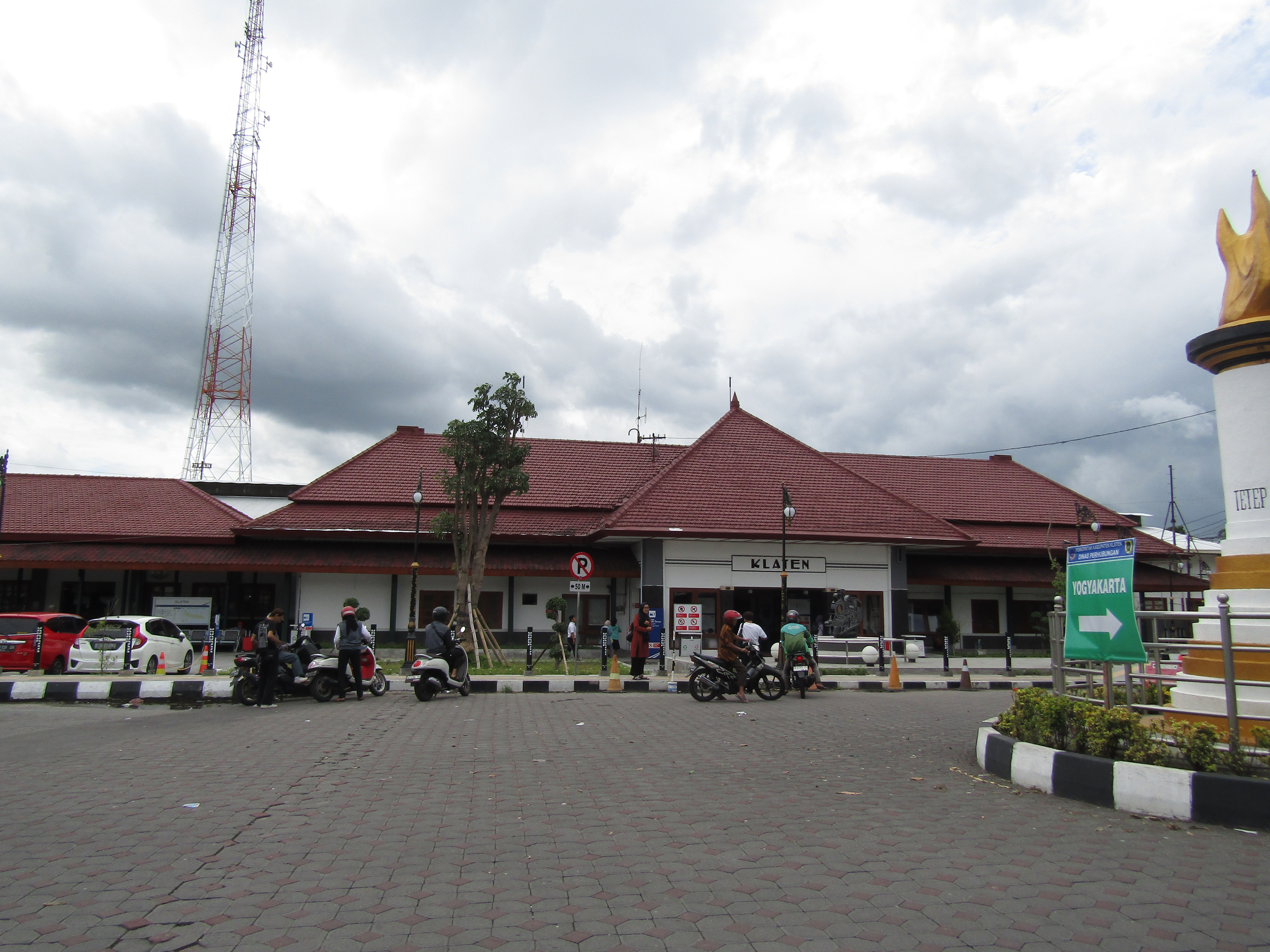
- Klaten Station entrance

General information
- Location: Jl. K.H. Samanhudi 53, Tonggalan, Central Klaten, Klaten Regency; Central Java; Indonesia
- Coordinates: 7.71222°S 110.603°E
- Elevation: +151 m (495 ft)
- System: Commuter, airport, and inter-city rail station
- Owner: Kereta Api Indonesia
- Operator: Kereta Api Indonesia; Kereta Commuter Indonesia; Kereta Api Logistik
- Lines: Yogyakarta Line; Adisumarmo Airport Rail Link; Joglosemarkerto; Kutoarjo–Purwosari
- Platforms: 1 side platform 1 island platform
- Tracks: 6

Construction
- Structure type: Ground
- Parking: Available
- Accessible: Available

Other information
- Station code: KT • 3110
- Classification: Class I

History
- Opened: 9 July 1871
- Electrified: 3 November 2020
- Former names: Klatten Station

Services
Preceding station	Kereta Api Indonesia	Following station
Terminus	Adisumarmo Airport Rail Link	Purwosari towards Adisoemarmo International Airport
Preceding station		Following station
Srowot towards Yogyakarta	Yogyakarta Line	Ceper towards Palur
Location
- Location within Java

Klaten Station (KT) is a class I railway station located in Tonggalan, Central Klaten, Klaten Regency at an altitude of +151 meters, including in the Operation Area VI Yogyakarta. This station is close to the outer ring road of Klaten.

Most passenger trains passing the Solo–Yogyakarta route stop at this station. As of September 2020, passenger trains that pass directly or do not stop at this station are Argo Wilis, Gajayana, Bima, Turangga, Malabar, Mutiara Selatan and Sancaka (morning schedule for Yogyakarta and night schedule for Surabaya Gubeng).

To the east of this station, before the Ceper Station, there is a Ketandan Station which has been inactive since the Kutoarjo–Solo double tracks was operated.

== Building and layout ==
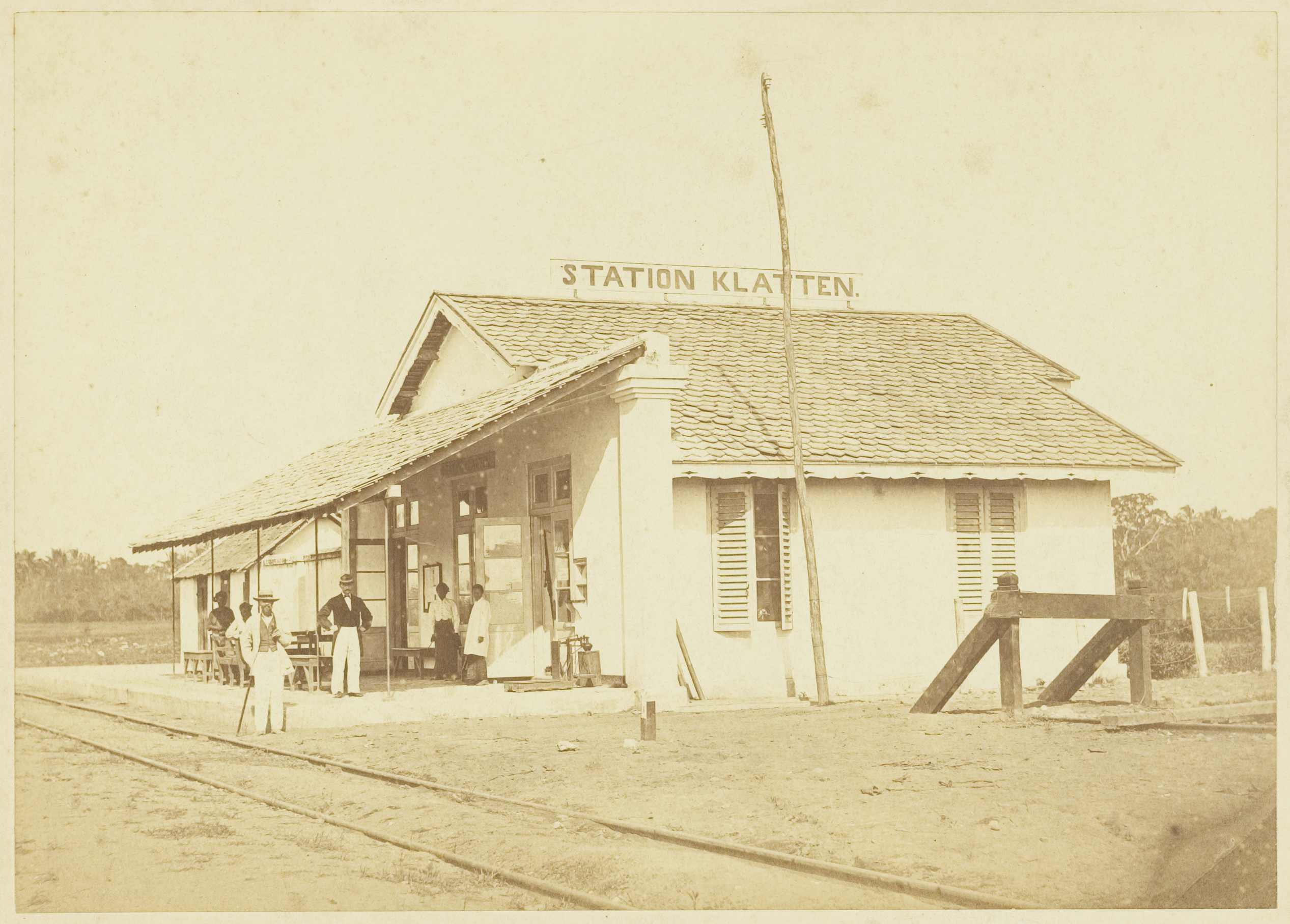
The first generation of Klaten Station

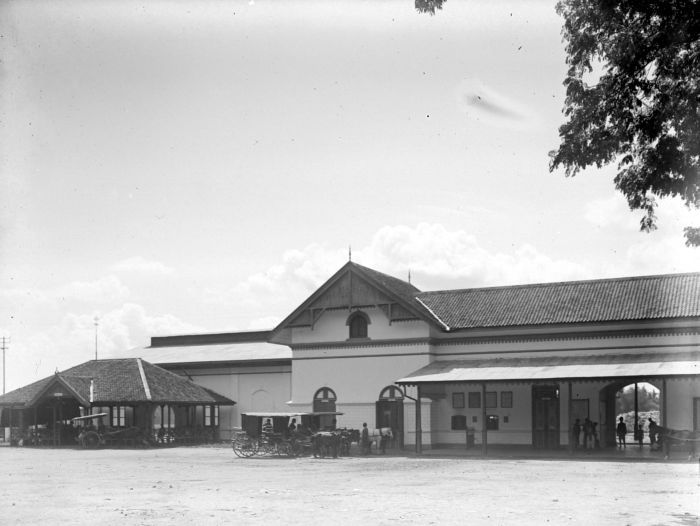
The front view of the second generation of Klaten Station

Klaten Station has six train lines. At first, line 1 was a straight line. After the Srowot–Ketandan double-track section was put into operation in 2001 and the Brambanan–Delanggu section on 15 December 2003, line 1 is a straight line towards Yogyakarta and line 2 is a straight line towards Solo. However, there is a rail track that bends from the direction of Yogyakarta when approaching line 2 because there are remnants of the station platform from the NIS era which is quite wide. Tracks 5 and 6 leading to the warehouse have now been repaired and repurposed to accommodate parked trains.

To support double-track operation, the mechanical signaling system at this station was replaced with an electrical signaling system made by Len Industri which had been installed since 2013 and had only been operational since 12 February 2019.

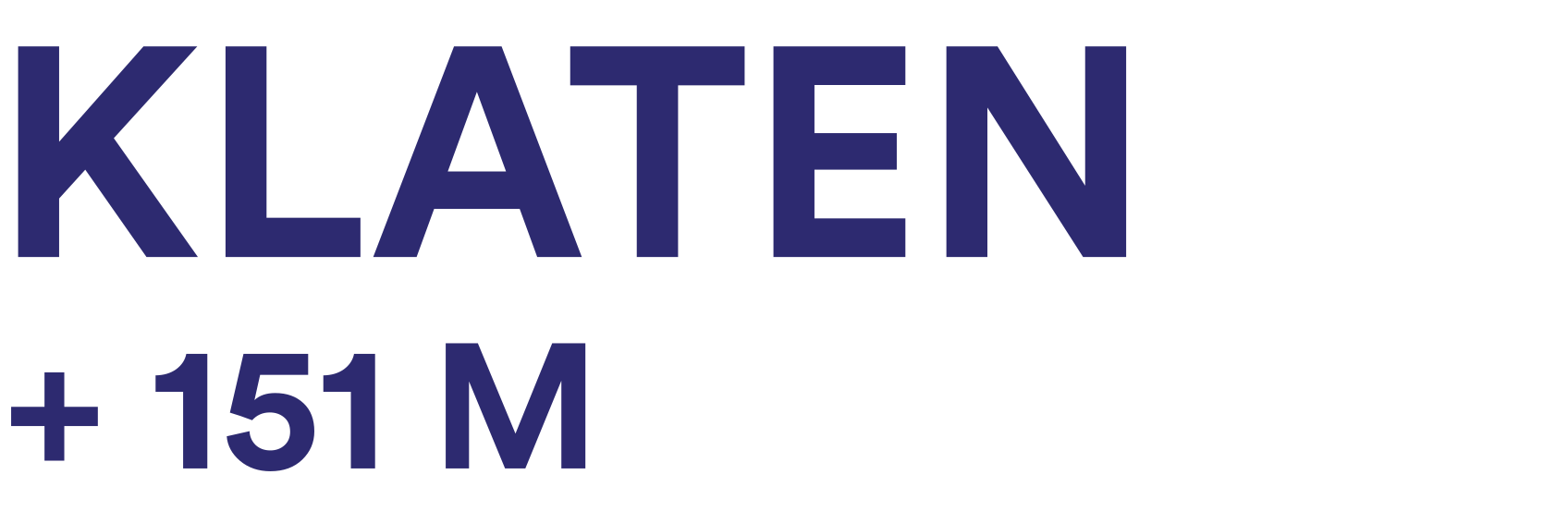
Y06 AS01
G
Main building
P
Platform floor
Side platform, the doors are opened on the right side
Line 1
← (Srowot) Yogyakarta Line to Yogyakarta
Inter-city and Central Java–Yogyakarta Local train stop
Straight tracks to Yogyakarta
Island platform, the doors are opened on the left side
Line 2
Yogyakarta Line to Solo Balapan (Ceper) →
Inter-city and Central Java–Yogyakarta Local train stop
Straight tracks to Solo Balapan
Island platform
Line 3
Additional lane for inter-city train stop

Adisumarmo Airport Rail Link to Adisoemarmo International Airport (Purwosari) →

Line 4
EMU stabling line
Line 5
EMU stabling line
Line 6
EMU stabling line

== Services ==
The following is a list of train services at the Klaten Station.

=== Passenger services ===
- Executive class
  - Argo Dwipangga (regular and facultative), to Gambir via Yogyakarta-Purwokerto-Cirebon and to Solo Balapan (luxury type executive train is available on a regular schedule)
  - Argo Lawu (regular and facultative), to Gambir via Yogyakarta-Purwokerto-Cirebon and to Solo Balapan (luxury type executive trains are available on regular schedules)
  - Gajayana (facultative), to Gambir via Yogyakarta-Purwokerto-Cirebon and to Malang via Madiun-Blitar
- Mixed class
  - Singasari, to Pasar Senen via Lempuyangan-Purwokerto-Cirebon and to Blitar via Purwosari-Madiun (executive-economy plus)
  - Gaya Baru Malam Selatan, to Pasar Senen via Lempuyangan-Purwokerto-Cirebon Prujakan and to Surabaya Gubeng via Purwosari-Madiun-Jombang (executive-economy plus)
  - Ranggajati, to Cirebon via Yogyakarta-Purwokerto and to Surabaya Gubeng continued to Jember via Solo Balapan-Madiun-Jombang (executive-business)
  - Wijayakusuma, Surabaya Gubeng to Ketapang via Madiun-Jombang and to Cilacap (executive-premium economy)
  - Anjasmoro, to Pasar Senen via Yogyakarta-Purwokerto and to Jombang via Madiun (executive-economy plus)
  - Senja Utama Solo, to Pasar Senen via Yogyakarta-Purwokerto-Cirebon (executive-premium economy)
  - Fajar Utama Solo, to Solo Balapan (executive-premium economy)
  - Mataram, to Pasar Senen via Yogyakarta-Purwokerto-Cirebon and to Solo Balapan (executive-business or premium economy)
  - Lodaya, to Bandung via Yogyakarta-Tasikmalaya and to Solo Balapan (regular: executive-premium economy, addition: business-executive)
  - Sancaka Utara, to Kutoarjo and to Solo Balapan continued to Gambringan-Surabaya Pasar Turi via Gundih-Cepu-Bojonegoro (business-executive)
  - Malioboro Express, to Yogyakarta and to Malang via Solo Balapan-Madiun-Blitar (executive-economy plus)
  - Sancaka, to Yogyakarta (evening schedule) and to Surabaya Gubeng via Solo Balapan-Madiun-Jombang (morning schedule) (executive-premium economy)
  - Joglosemarkerto, Central Java and the Special Region of Yogyakarta executive-economy class plus trains with the following objectives:
    - Tegal via Yogyakarta-Purwokerto continued Solo Balapan-Yogyakarta via Semarang Tawang-Gundih
    - Solo Balapan continued Semarang Tawang
    - Solo Balapan
  - Logawa, to Purwokerto via Lempuyangan and to Surabaya Gubeng to continue Jember via Purwosari-Madiun-Jombang (business-economy)
- Premium economy class
  - Jayakarta, to Pasar Senen via Yogyakarta-Purwokerto-Cirebon and to Surabaya Gubeng via Solo Balapan-Madiun-Jombang
- Plus economy class
  - Jaka Tingkir, to Pasar Senen via Lempuyangan-Purwokerto-Cirebon Prujakan and to Purwosari
- Economy class
  - Kahuripan, to Kiaracondong via Lempuyangan-Tasikmalaya and to Blitar via Purwosari-Madiun
  - Pasundan, to Kiaracondong via Lempuyangan-Tasikmalaya and to Surabaya Gubeng via Purwosari-Madiun-Jombang
  - Sri Tanjung, to Lempuyangan and to Surabaya Gubeng to continue Ketapang via Purwosari-Madiun-Jombang
  - Bengawan, to Pasar Senen via Lempuyangan-Purwokerto-Cirebon Prujakan and to Purwosari
- Commuter Rail
  - KRL Commuterline Yogyakarta–Solo, to Yogyakarta, Solo Balapan, and Palur
- Airport Rail Link
  - Adisumarmo Airport Rail Link, from and to Solo Balapan-Adisoemarmo International Airport (airport executive)

Preceding station	Kereta Api Indonesia	Following station
Srowot towards Kutoarjo	Kutoarjo–Purwosari	Ketandan towards Purwosari
