= Gaya Baru Malam Selatan =

Passenger train service in Indonesia

- Gaya Baru Malam Selatan with Stainless Steel New Generation trainset, prepared to arrived at Lempuyangan Station from Surabaya, 2026.

Overview
- Service type: Inter-city rail
- Status: Operational
- Locale: Operational Area VIII Surabaya
- Predecessor: Gaja Baru Express (28 September 1964 – 14 June 1968)
- First service: 17 February 1975
- Current operator: Kereta Api Indonesia

Route
- Termini: Pasar Senen; Surabaya Gubeng
- Distance travelled: 820 km (509 miles)
- Average journey time: 12 hours 29 minutes
- Service frequency: daily each way
- Train number: 89-90

On-board services
- Classes: economy and executive
- Seating arrangements: 50 seats arranged 2-2 (executive class); 72 seats arranged 2-2 (economy class)
- Catering facilities: On-board cafe and trolley service
- Observation facilities: The duplex panoramic glass, with blinds, heat insulating laminated layer
- Entertainment facilities: free Wi-Fi, Air conditioning Passenger information system, USB, etc

Technical
- Rolling stock: CC206/CC203/CC201
- Track gauge: 1,067 mm
- Operating speed: 81–120 kilometres per hour (50–75 mph)
Route map

Gaya Baru Malam Selatan (GBMS) is an passenger train with the executive and economy that operated by Kereta Api Indonesia which between Pasar Senen and Surabaya Gubeng via Purwokerto and Lempuyangan. Despite its distinctive name of a train that operates at "night", but the most GBMS trips are now made during the day.

The Gaya Baru Malam Selatan is one of the oldest (begin operating) train services that still operating under the same name as when it was first introduced.

== History ==
=== Gaja Baru Express ===
In 1964, The National Railway Corporation (PNKA) inaugurated the use of new passenger coaches with compressed air brake systems imported intact from the Nippon Sharyo factory in Japan for the Bandung–Jakarta express train, which began operating on 20 April 1964, the first of many to serve the Java and Sumatra rail networks.

On 17 November 1966, PNKA set a new schedule and is also introducing night express services on the Jakarta–Surabaya route via both the southern and northern routes. On 14 June 1968, The Gaja Baru Express train's afternoon schedule has a new brand, namely "Limited Express" Djaya or in Indonesian called Express Terbatas Djaya, while the night service retained the name "Gaja Baru." The Djaya Limited Express train lasted until 1973.

On 6 January 1969, PNKA discontinued the Gaja Baru Malam Selatan train. Meanwhile, the Gaja Baru Malam Utara train remained. At the same time, Djaja also added a second-class service (BW/AC) with limited ticket availability.

=== Gaja Baru Malam ===
Then in 1971, the Gaja Baru Malam train was launched with the route Gambir–Surabaya Pasarturi via the northern Java line.

On 17 February 1975, launched a splinter from the Gaja Baru Malam train, namely the Gaja Baru Malam Selatan train, this new service has a Surabaya Kota–Jakarta connection via the central Java line (via Cirebon–Yogyakarta). In 1976, the Gaja Baru Malam train was rebranded as the Gaja Baru Malam Utara train.

=== Gaya Baru Malam Selatan Lebaran ===
In the 1980s, a special holiday service was launched, the Gaya Baru Malam Selatan Lebaran train, which later changed to Gaya Baru Malam Selatan Utama train. In 1990, the Gaya Baru Malam Selatan Utama train was rebranded as the Jayabaya train, then Jayabaya Selatan (not Jayabaya).

On 15 June 2017, PT KAI relaunched the Gaya Baru Malam Selatan (Southern Night Style) train for Eid al-Fitr and Eid al-Adha. Due to high occupancy, this service operated regularly after the Eid season under the name Gaya Baru Malam Selatan Premium. On 28 September 2017, following the 72nd anniversary of KAI, the Gaya Baru Malam Selatan Premium train was renamed the Jayakarta Premium train, becoming the longest train on the southern Java route.

=== Historical Operational ===
This train, which first operated on 17 February 1975, is the successor to the Gaja Baru Express service which operated from 28 September 1964 until it changed to the Djaja Limited Express in 1968.

Since 1 January 2019, the Gaya Baru Malam Selatan train is one of five economy class train services whose subsidies have been stopped by the government. Along with the Brantas train, this train also experienced the addition of executive class services starting 1 September 2019.

Since the enactment of a new travel train chart on 1 December 2019, the Gaya Baru Malam Selatan train began operating using economy class coaches after seating adjustments were made, with the original number of 106 seats reduced to 80 seats to improve passenger comfort.

Around 2020, the operation of the Gaya Baru Malam Selatan train was transferred from Operational Area I Jakarta to Operational Area VIII Surabaya. Along with this change, the trains were transferred from the Jakarta Kota Train Depot (JAKK) to the Sidotopo Train Depot (SDT) in Surabaya, as part of the exchange of operational services with the Jayakarta.

The Gaya Baru Malam Selatan train added a stop at Cikarang starting 1 February 2022.

As part of improvements to economy class services, starting 14 March 2024, the Gaya Baru Malam Selatan train will use a new generation of economy class coaches modified by the Manggarai Yasa Center, manufactured in 2024, with 72 seats.

On 12 December 2024, the Gaya Baru Malam Selatan return experienced an increase in service in the form of a change in facilities, using a series of mixed executive and economy class coaches of the new generation stainless steel type made by PT INKA released in 2024. The current series consists of one generator coach, four executive coaches, one dining car, four economy coaches and one baggage car.

Beginning on 1 February 2025 following the enactment of a new travel train chart in 2025, the Gaya Baru Malam Selatan exchanges rakes with the Jayabaya which operates on a different connection.

== Tariff ==
The train fare ranges from Rp. 360,000–Rp. 600,000, depending on the class, booking time and distance traveled by passengers.

== Station ==
The following is a list of stations at which the Gaya Baru Maram Selatan stops at along its routes:

- Pasar Senen (start/end)
- Jatinegara (only bound from Surabaya)
- Bekasi
- Cikarang
- Pegaden Baru
- Haurgeulis
- Jatibarang
- Arjawinangun
- Cirebon Prujakan
- Ciledug
- Prupuk
- Bumiayu
- Purwokerto
- Kroya
- Gombong
- Kebumen
- Kutoarjo
- Wates
- Lempuyangan
- Klaten
- Purwosari
- Sragen
- Walikukun
- Madiun
- Caruban
- Nganjuk
- Kertosono
- Jombang
- Mojokerto
- Wonokromo (only bound from Jakarta)
- Surabaya Gubeng (start/end)

== Incident ==
On 14 January 2024, the Gaya Baru Malam Selatan train hit a car at a level crossing at km 150+3 of the road between Srowot–Brambanan Station, Prambanan, Klaten, Central Java. The locomotive was damaged and extraordinary stop (BLB) at Brambanan railway station. The impact of the incident, train traffic on the southern and central Java lines of the Yogyakarta–Solo Balapan railway was temporarily disrupted.

- On 9 June 2024, Thick smoke appeared on the economy class train 1 of the Gaya Baru Malam Selatan train number 105, suspected to be caused by an electrical short circuit. This caused a long stop at Ketanggungan, Brebes. At 21.35 WIB, the GBMS train resumed its journey and was replaced by economy class train 1 at Cirebon railway station. There were no fatalities or injuries in this incident.
