= Delanggu railway station =

Railway station in Indonesia

Y08 Delanggu Station Stasiun Delanggu
- Delanggu Station as of 2025.

General information
- Location: Jl. Stasiun Delanggu, Gatak, Delanggu, Klaten Regency; Central Java; Indonesia
- Coordinates: 7.6223396°S 110.7065839°E
- Elevation: +133 m (436 ft)
- Owner: Kereta Api Indonesia
- Operator: KAI Commuter
- Lines: KRL Commuter Yogyakarta Line; Kutoarjo–Purwosari–Solo Balapan
- Platforms: 1 side platform 4 island platforms
- Tracks: 4

Construction
- Structure type: Ground
- Parking: Available
- Accessible: Available

Other information
- Station code: DL • 3114
- Classification: Class III

History
- Opened: 1871
- Electrified: 2020
- Former names: Delangoe Halt

Services
Preceding station		Following station
Ceper towards Yogyakarta	Yogyakarta Line	Gawok towards Palur
Location
- Location within Java

Delanggu Station (DL) is a class III railway station located in Gatak, Delanggu, Klaten Regency; at an altitude of +133 amsl; included in the Operational Region VI Yogyakarta. This station is the easternmost and northernmost station in Klaten regency.

This station was previously built by the Nederlandsch-Indische Spoorweg Maatschappij (NIS) and opened to the public in 1871. This station is used as a stopover between Surakarta and Ngayogyakarta and is also used to distribute gunny and sugar sacks. from Delanggu sugar factory to various sugar factories in Vorstenlanden and to the port in Samarang.

== Building and layout ==
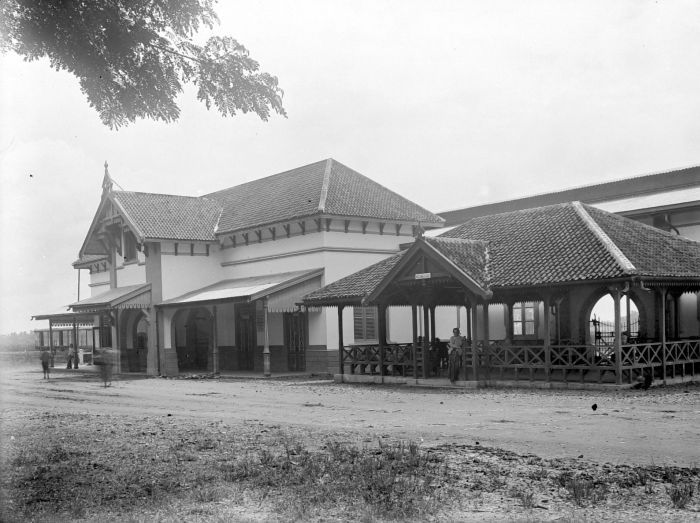
The Delanggu station in the 1900s

Initially, the station likely had four rail lines with line 2 being a straight line. Since the operation of the double track Yogyakarta–Solo segment of the Srowot–Ketandan segment in 2001 and the Brambanan–Delanggu segment were completed on 15 December 2003, line 2 has been used as a straight line towards Yogyakarta. As of 2005–2006, line 3 of these stations has completely become a straight line towards Solo.

To support the double tracks operation, the mechanical signaling system at this station was replaced with an electric signaling system made by PT Len Industri which had been installed since 2013 and then started operation in December 2015.

Starting 10 February 2021, to coincide with the launch of the 2021 train travel chart, this station together with three other stations (Ceper Station, Gawok Station, and Srowot Station) began serving KRL Commuterline across Yogyakarta–Solo.

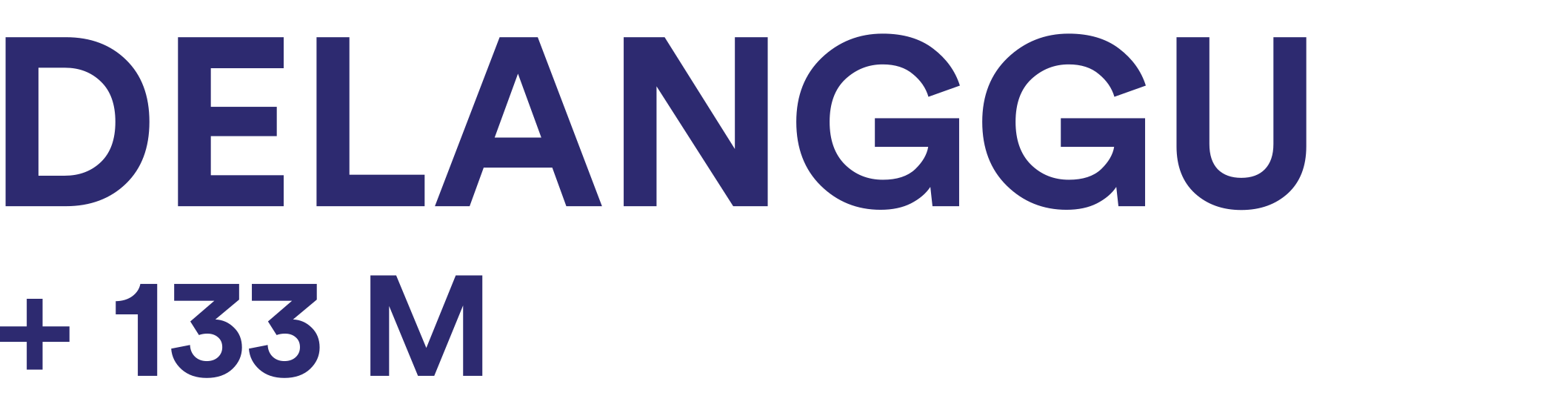
Y07
G
Main building
P
Platform floor
Side platform, the doors are opened on the right side
Line 1
Additional stop line
Island platform
Line 2
← (Ceper) Yogyakarta Line to Yogyakarta

Straight tracks to Yogyakarta

Island platform
Line 3
Yogyakarta Line to Solo Balapan (Gawok) →

Straight tracks to Solo Balapan

Island platform
Line 4
Additional stop line

== Services ==
The following is a list of train services at the Delanggu Station.

- Yogyakarta Line to Yogyakarta, Solo Balapan, and Palur

== Gallery ==
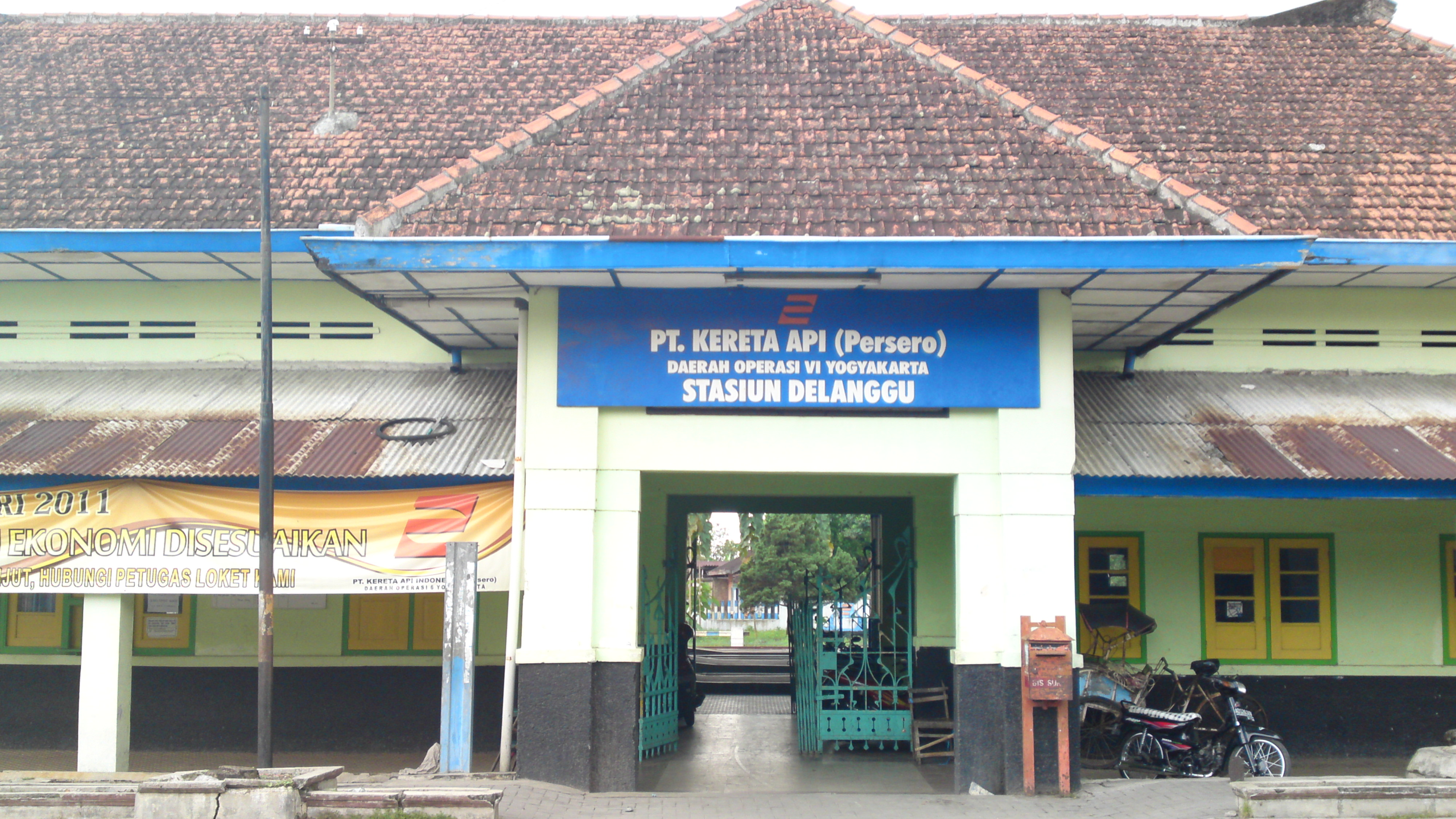
The front view of the station in 2011

Preceding station	Kereta Api Indonesia	Following station
Ceper towards Kutoarjo	Kutoarjo–Purwosari–Solo Balapan	Gawok towards Solo Balapan
