= Gawok railway station =

Railway station in Indonesia

Y09 Gawok Station Stasiun Gawok
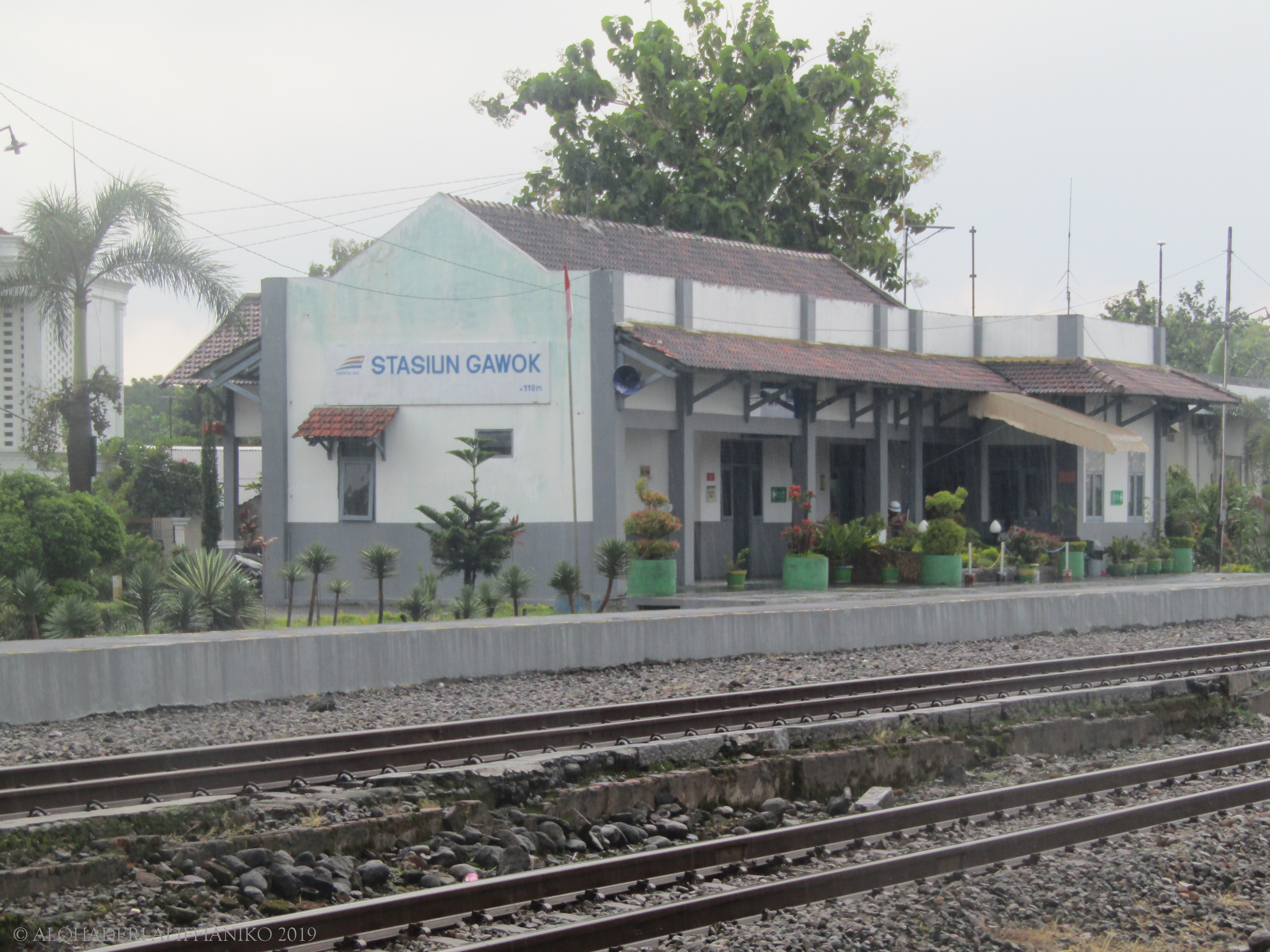
- Gawok Station prior to its upgrade

General information
- Location: Luwang, Gatak, Sukoharjo Regency; Central Java; Indonesia
- Coordinates: 7.5892186°S 110.7445157°E
- Elevation: +118 m (387 ft)
- Owner: Kereta Api Indonesia
- Operator: Kereta Commuter Indonesia
- Lines: Yogyakarta Line; Kutoarjo–Purwosari
- Platforms: 1 side platform 1 island platform
- Tracks: 4

Construction
- Structure type: Ground
- Parking: Available
- Accessible: Available

Other information
- Station code: GW • 3117
- Classification: Class III

History
- Opened: 1871
- Rebuilt: 1950s, 2005–2006
- Electrified: 2020

Services
| Preceding station | | Following station |
|---|---|---|
| Delanggu towards Yogyakarta | Yogyakarta Line | Purwosari towards Palur |
Location
- Location within Java

Gawok Station (GW) is a class III railway station located in Luwang, Gatak, Sukoharjo Regency; at an altitude of +118 meters, including in the Operational Area VI Yogyakarta. The station is not far from Gawok traditional market and Trangsan rattan industrial center.

== Building and layout ==
The station building which was previously on the east side of the rail, is now on the west side of the rail. There is no longer any former old building which is a legacy of the DKA (Djawatan Kereta Api) because it was demolished for the Kutoarjo–Yogyakarta–Purwosari double tracks project in 2007 and now only leaves the foundation.

This station has four train lines. Initially, the old Line 1 was a straight line. Since the operation of the double track Delanggu–Solo segment as of January 2007, the station layout has changed. The old line 2 of this station was changed to line 3 as a straight line towards Yogyakarta, while the old line 1 was changed to line 4 as a straight line towards Solo.

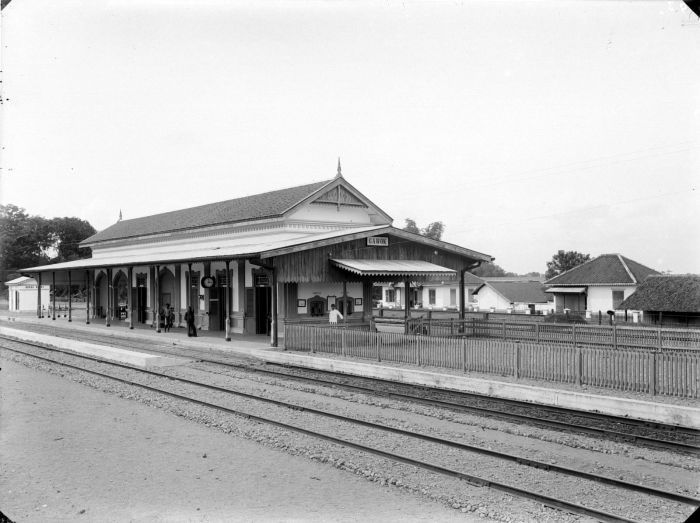
Gawok Station circa 1920s.

Since the electric signaling system made by PT Len Industri was installed in 2013 which was only operated on to replace the mechanical signaling system at this station in December 2015, the track layout at this station has been changed again, but has not changed the number of lines. Line 2, which used to be the old line 3, has been dismantled and a new turning lane is built on the southeast side of the station so that line 3 is now used as a new line 2, line 4 old is now used as line 3 new, and the new line is used as a new line 4, Finally, this station has straight tracks on lines 2 and 3.

Starting 10 February 2021, to coincide with the launch of the 2021 train travel chart, this station together with three other stations (Delanggu Station, Ceper Station, and Srowot Station) began serving KRL Commuterline between Yogyakarta–Solo Balapan.

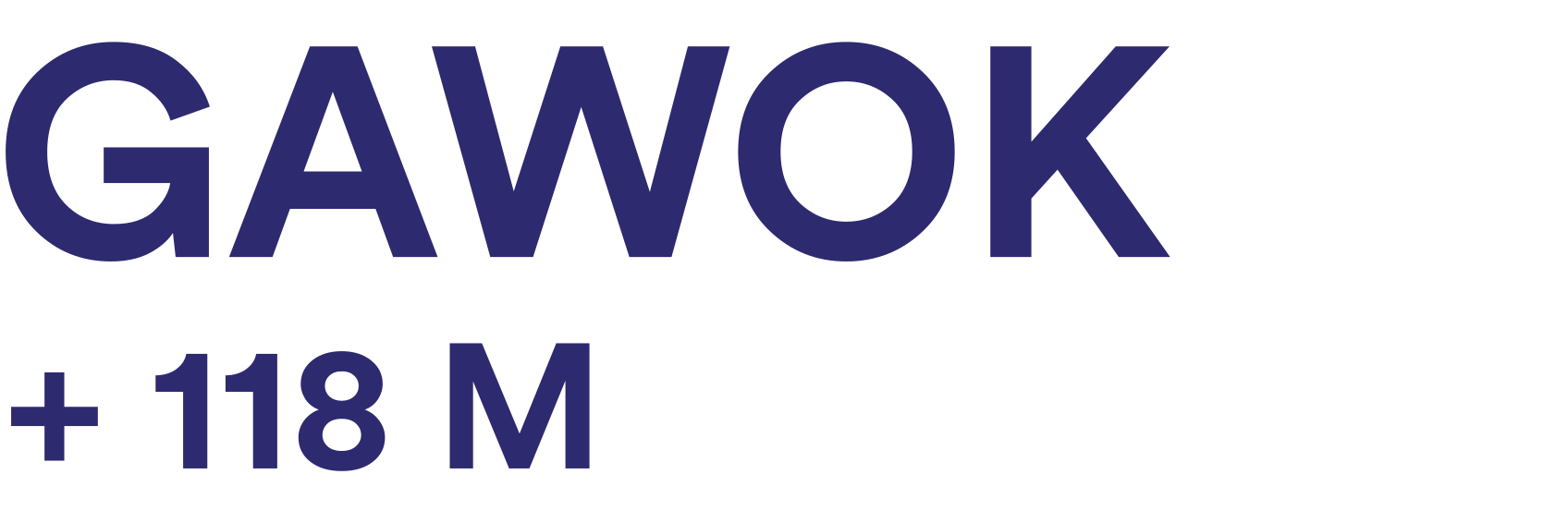
Y07
G
Main building
P
Platform floor
Side platform, the doors are opened on the right side
Line 1
← (Delanggu) Yogyakarta Line to Yogyakarta
Island platform the doors are opened on the right side
Line 2
← (Delanggu) Yogyakarta Line to Yogyakarta

Straight tracks to Yogyakarta

Line 3
Straight tracks to Solo Balapan
Line 4
Yogyakarta Line to Solo Balapan (Purwosari) →
Side platform, the doors are opened on the right side

== Services ==
The following is a list of train services at the Gawok Station.

- Yogyakarta Line to Yogyakarta, Solo Balapan, and Palur

| Preceding station | Kereta Api Indonesia | Following station |
|---|---|---|
| Delanggu towards Kutoarjo | Kutoarjo–Purwosari–Solo Balapan | Purwosari towards Solo Balapan |
