= Srowot railway station =

Railway station in Indonesia

Y05 Srowot Station Stasiun Srowot
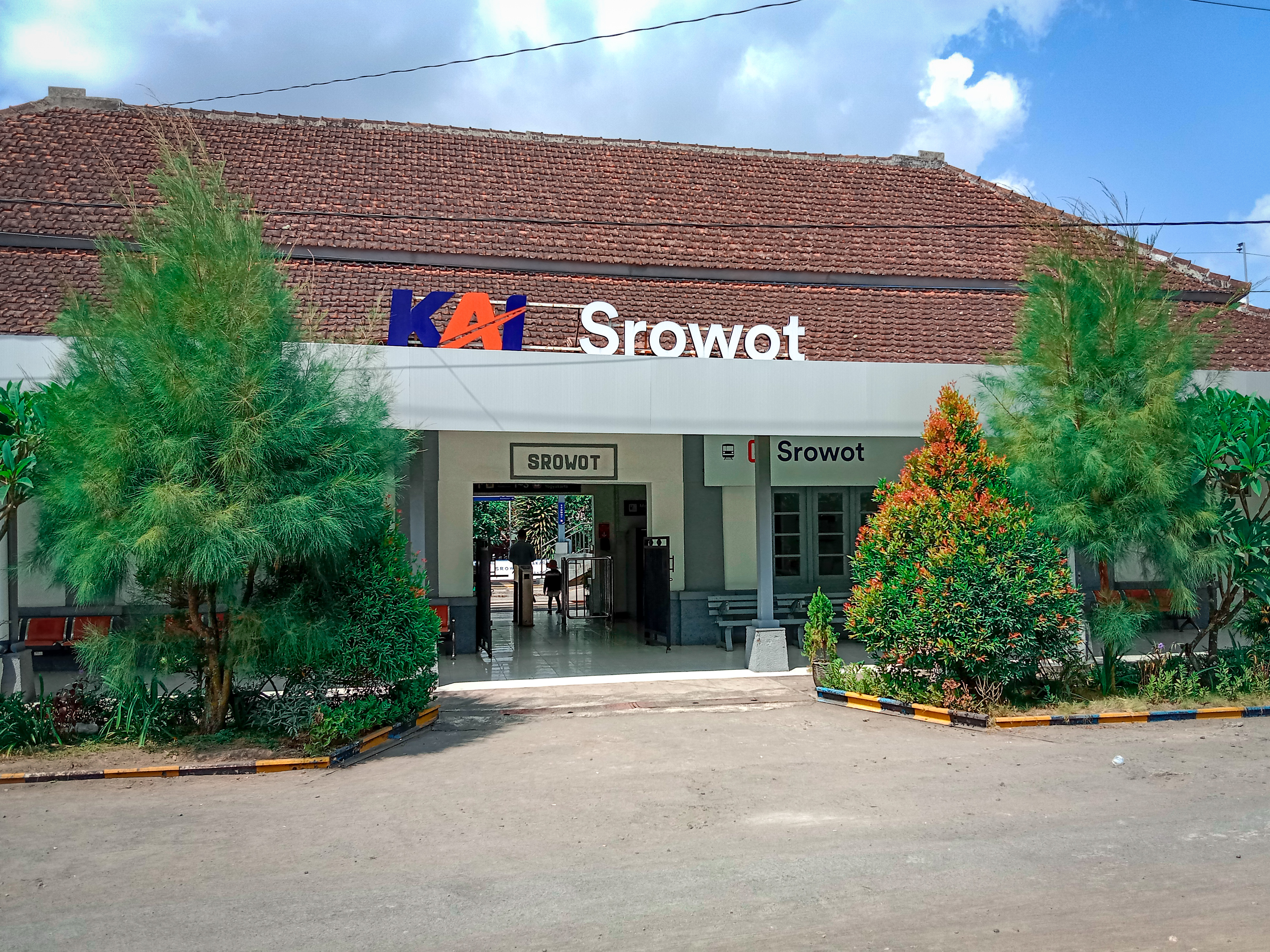
- Srowot Station as of 2021.

General information
- Location: Gondangan, Jogonalan, Klaten Regency; Central Java; Indonesia
- Coordinates: 7.7413178°S 110.5491275°E
- Elevation: +152 m (499 ft)
- Owner: Kereta Api Indonesia
- Operator: Kereta Commuter Indonesia
- Lines: Solo Balapan–Yogyakarta; Kutoarjo–Purwosari–Solo Balapan
- Platforms: 1 side platform 2 island platforms
- Tracks: 4

Construction
- Structure type: Ground
- Parking: Available
- Accessible: Available

Other information
- Station code: SWT
- Classification: Class III

History
- Rebuilt: 2015
- Electrified: 2020

Services
Preceding station		Following station
Brambanan towards Yogyakarta	Yogyakarta Line	Klaten towards Palur
Location
- Location within Java

Srowot Station (SWT) is a class III railway station located in Gondangan, Jogonalan, Klaten Regency, Central Java, Indonesia. The station, which is located at an altitude of +152 m, is a highest active railway station in Operational Region VI Yogyakarta of the KAI.

Originally the station had five railway tracks with track 1 being a straight track and two siding tracks for loading and unloading freight services. Since the operation of the Yogyakarta–Solo double tracks to Ketandan Station in 2001 and the Brambanan–Delanggu segment as of 15 December 2003, track 2 has been used as a new straight track towards Solo. As of 2005–2006, track 1 is a straight line to Yogyakarta.

To support double tracks operation, the mechanical signaling system at this station was replaced with an electric one made by PT Len Industri which had been installed since 2013 and started operation on 12 February 2019.

Srowot Station was previously one of the stations that had revenue from freight transportation because it was the end station for transporting sugar and molasses belonging to Gondang Winangoen sugar factory, Klaten until the 1990s. Therefore, this station and the sugar factory were previously connected by a junction to the east of the station yard. The spur to the sugar factory was once passed by a steam locomotive made by Backer & Rueb (Breda), the Netherlands in 1896. It is now only leaves a path, including a former bridge.

Starting 10 February 2021, coincide with the launch of the 2021 train travel chart, this station together with three other stations (Ceper Station, Gawok Station, and Delanggu Station) have started serving KRL Commuterline across Yogyakarta-Solo Balapan.

== Services ==
The following is a list of train services at the Srowot Station.

- KAI Commuter Yogyakarta Line to Yogyakarta, Solo Balapan, and Palur

Preceding station	Kereta Api Indonesia	Following station
Brambanan towards Kutoarjo	Kutoarjo–Purwosari–Solo Balapan	Klaten towards Solo Balapan
