= Purwosari railway station =

Railway station in Indonesia

Y10 AS02 BK01 Purwosari Station Stasiun Purwosari
- Front view of Purwosari Station, 2024

General information
- Location: Jl. Slamet Riyadi No. 502, Purwosari, Laweyan, Surakarta; Central Java; Indonesia
- Coordinates: 7.5617°S 110.7965°E
- Elevation: +98 m (322 ft)
- System: Commuter, Tourist, airport, and Inter-city rail station
- Owner: Kereta Api Indonesia
- Operator: Kereta Api Indonesia; Kereta Commuter Indonesia
- Lines: Yogyakarta Line; Adisumarmo Airport Rail Link Adisumarmo Airport Rail Link; Batara Kresna Railbus
- Platforms: 1 side platform 3 island platforms
- Tracks: 7
- Connections: Batik Solo Trans: 1 Bandara Adisumarmo–Palur; 2 Kartasura–Palur; 2 Kartasura–Palur (via Klewer Market)

Construction
- Structure type: Ground
- Parking: Available
- Accessible: Available

Other information
- Station code: PWS • 3120
- Classification: Large class type C

History
- Opened: 27 March 1871
- Former names: Poerwosarie Station/Halt

Services
Preceding station	Kereta Api Indonesia	Following station
Solo Balapan Terminus	Purwosari–Solo Balapan	Terminus
Terminus	Kutoarjo–Purwosari	Gawok towards Kutoarjo
Klaten Terminus	Adisumarmo Airport Rail Link	Solo Balapan towards Adisoemarmo International Airport
Terminus	Batara Kresna railbus	Solo Kota towards Wonogiri
Preceding station		Following station
Gawok towards Yogyakarta	Yogyakarta Line	Solo Balapan towards Palur
Location
- Location within Java

Purwosari Station (PWS) (Indonesian: Stasiun Purwosari, Javanese: ꦱꦼꦠꦠ꧀ꦱꦶꦪꦸꦤ꧀ꦥꦸꦂꦮꦱꦫꦶ, romanized: Sêtasiyun Purwasari) is a large class type C railway station located in Purwosari, Laweyan, Surakarta, Central Java, Indonesia. The station which is located at an altitude of +98 m is included in the Operational Area VI Yogyakarta and only serves economy class trains across south and local or commuter.

This station is a railroad branch station between the directions Surabaya and Wonogiri. The route to Surabaya is the main route, while the one to Wonogiri is a cross-branch route. As far as Sangkrah Station, this secondary route is unique because it is one of the active railways in Indonesia that is lined up or side by side with the main road, in addition to branching to the Pertamina Madiun Depot. In the past, along the Purwosari–Sangkrah route, there were eight small stops, namely Pesanggrahan, Ngadisuran, Bando, Ngapeman, Pasarpon, Cayudan, Kauman, and Lojiwetan. The bus stops are no longer there.

== History ==
Purwosari Station is the second oldest train station in Surakarta. In the map of the Samarang – Vorstenlanden line published in 1869, the collection of the Dutch Universiteit Leiden, this station is not mentioned at all. The Nederlandsch-Indische Spoorweg Maatschappij (NIS) plan to build a railway line (NIS) is Solo Station (Solo Balapan Station) and Solo-Rivier Station, which are located in the Bengawan Solo valley. However, on maps drawn in 1878, the station's name began to be called (but under the wrong name, Poerwodadie). It is estimated that the addition of this station will be carried out together with the finishing of the railway line and also opened together with the official opening of the Ceper – Solo NIS segment line on 27 March 1871.

Since 1907, this station has used an architecture similar to that of Kedungjati and Willem I Ambarawa Stations. The station which was originally a side platform later became an island station. The size of this station building is smaller than Kedungjati or Purwosari because the roof span is only 13 meters, while Kedungjati is 14.65 meters and Ambarawa is 21.75 meters. This building consists of a canopy that covers the main building and a path that flanks it.

== Building and layout ==
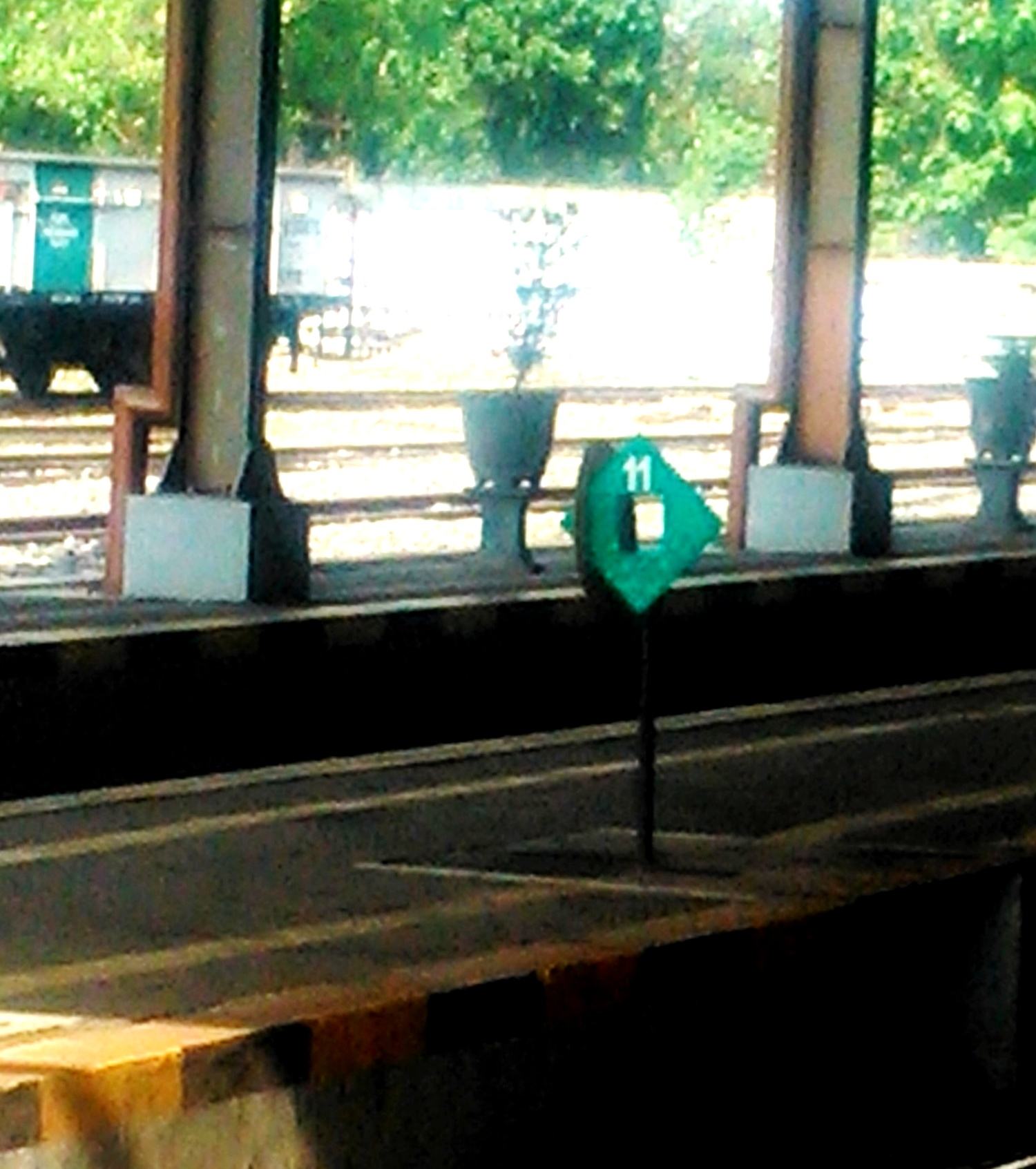
The mechanical switch symbol lantern in the platform of Purwosari Station, before it was dismantled.

Initially Purwosari Station had eight train lines with line 2 being a straight line. After the double track crossing Solo - Yogyakarta was operated in 2007, line 2 was used as a straight line towards Solo Balapan and line 3 was used as a straight line towards Yogyakarta. Line 1-5 is often used to welcome arrivals as well as to cross directly the train, line 6-8 to park freight cars, and two additional lines to the locomotive depot and cement warehouse. Although this station has undergone renovations in the form of an overcapping roof since the Eid homecoming season in October 2010, the original station building has been preserved and made a cultural heritage.

This station used to be unique because in the middle of the rail yard that had been given overcapping there was a switch and an intersection that was connected to line 3 to line 4. The intersection crossed the platforms on the two lines. However, since the station's signaling system was replaced with an electric signaling system made by PT Len Industri Indonesia (Persero) in December 2015, line 4, wesel, as well as the intersection was dismantled to widen the platform so that the station only has seven lines.

To the east from line 1 there is a fork towards Wonogiri. From this station there is also a fork that goes to Boyolali through Kartasura which has now been deactivated. This line also has branches in Tegalsari towards Colomadu. Until now some parts of the remnants of this route can still be seen.

Formerly Purwosari Station had a locomotive depot; There is still a water tower on the north side of the station as a legacy as a locomotive depot. Currently, the depot is still operating, but it is not a locomotive depot, but a mechanical dispenser. The loading and unloading of cement is also carried out at this station.

This station was last renovated in 2017, by replacing the floor of the station, which was originally known as the NIS tile, with marble floors. This tile, produced by Alfred Regout & Co., Maastricht, Netherlands, has a size of 20 × 20 cm with an uneven texture to facilitate airflow. This tile is strong, sturdy, and durable considering the original function of this station as a goods station.

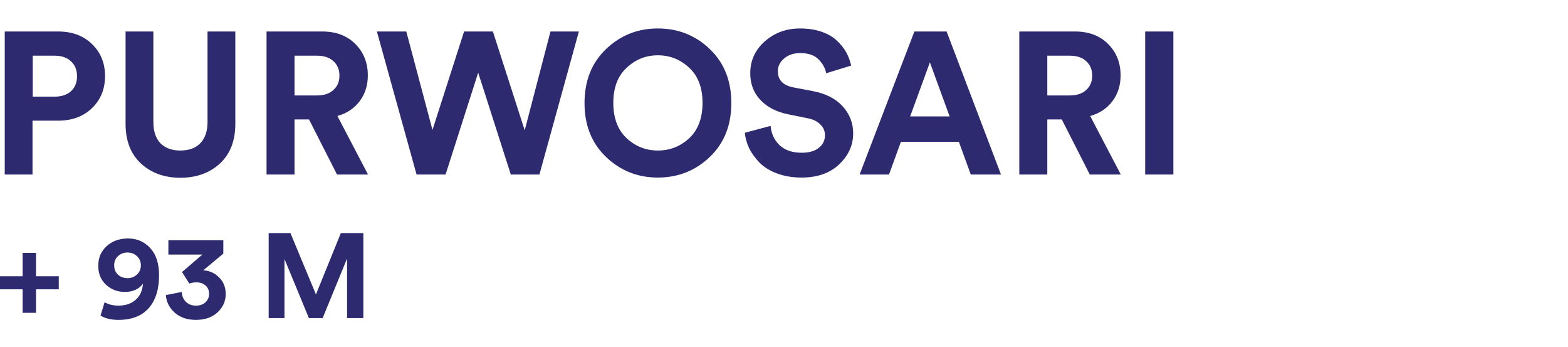
Y10 AS02 BK01
P Platform floor	Line 7	Train parking
P Platform floor	Line 6	Train parking
P Platform floor	Line 5	Train parking
P Platform floor	Line 4	Inter-city/freight train stop
P Platform floor	Island platform
P Platform floor	Line 3	← (Gawok) Yogyakarta Line to Yogyakarta, Adisumarmo Airport Rail Link to Klaten; Inter-city and Central Java–Yogyakarta local train stop towards Yogyakarta; Straight tracks to Yogyakarta
P Platform floor	Island platform, the doors are opened on the left side of the train arrival from the east
P Platform floor	Line 2	Yogyakarta Line to Solo Balapan, Adisumarmo Airport Rail Link to Adisoemarmo International Airport (Solo Balapan) → Inter-city and Central Java–Yogyakarta local train stop towards Solo Balapan; Straight tracks to Solo Balapan
P Platform floor	Island platform, the doors are opened on the right side of the train arrival from the west
P Platform floor	Line 1	Batara Kresna Railbus to Wonogiri (Solo Kota) →
P Platform floor	Side platform, the doors are opened on the left side of the train arrival from the east
G	Main building

== Services ==
The following is a list of train services at the Purwosari Station.

=== Passenger services ===
- Mixed class
  - Singasari, to Pasar Senen via Lempuyangan-Purwokerto-Cirebon and to Blitar via Madiun (executive-economy plus)
  - Gaya Baru Malam Selatan, to Pasar Senen via Lempuyangan-Purwokerto-Cirebon Prujakan and to Surabaya Gubeng via Madiun-Jombang (executive-economy plus)
  - Logawa, to Purwokerto via Lempuyangan and to Surabaya Gubeng to continue Jember via Madiun-Jombang (business-economy)
- Plus economy class
  - Jaka Tingkir, from and to Pasar Senen via Lempuyangan-Purwokerto-Cirebon Prujakan
- Economy class
  - Kahuripan, to Kiaracondong via Lempuyangan-Tasikmalaya and to Blitar via Madiun
  - Pasundan, to Kiaracondong via Lempuyangan-Tasikmalaya and to Surabaya Gubeng via Madiun
  - Sri Tanjung, to Lempuyangan and to Ketapang via Madiun-Surabaya Kota
  - Bengawan, from and to Pasar Senen via Lempuyangan-Purwokerto-Cirebon Prujakan
- Economy commuter
  - Yogyakarta Line to Yogyakarta, Solo Balapan, and Palur
  - Batara Kresna Railbus from and to Wonogiri
- Airport Rail Link
  - Adisumarmo Airport Rail Link to Klaten and to Adisoemarmo International Airport (airport executive)
- Tourist train
  - Sepur Kluthuk Jaladara, to Solo Kota

=== Freight services ===
- Over-night service, destination to:
  - Surabaya Kota via Madiun-Jombang and to Bandung via Lempuyangan-Tasikmalaya
  - Malang via Madiun-Blitar and to Jakarta Gudang via Lempuyangan-Purwokerto

== Intermodal connection ==
A Batik Solo Trans bus station is located nearby, serving Corridor 2 of the service.

Type	Route	Destination
Batik Solo Trans	1	Adisumarmo International Airport–Palur
Batik Solo Trans	2	Kerten–Palur
Batik Solo Trans	2	Kerten–Palur (via Klewer Market)

== Controversies ==
Since November–December 2019, this station has installed signboards to go to certain rooms/track numbers/facilities, track directions along with the distance traveled, as well as monitor screens for information on train departures and arrivals in real time which looks like those at the airport. This board then became viral on the social media site Facebook due to a writing error in English "departure" under the word "Kedatangan (Arrival)", which was finally corrected on 3 January 2020.

== Incident ==
On 7 May 1981, the PO Flores buses carrying a field trip group from Wijana Catholic Middle School were hit by the Solo High-Speed Train west of Purwosari Station. According to the chronology of the incident, there were three buses traveling side by side. The first and second buses managed to pass the crossing, but the third bus did not. The middle section of the third bus collided with the Solo High-Speed Train, rendering it out of shape. This incident killed 31 people, and 22 remain hospitalized at Mangkubumen Hospital in Solo. Total losses to the PJKA reached Rp 5 million, and the locomotive required intensive repairs at the Yogyakarta Yasa Center. PO Flores was found guilty of the incident. After the incident, at the crossing number 99, a road divider was built to separate the traffic flow.

On 1 January 2005, an accident occurred between the KA Bima from Gambir Station to Surabaya Gubeng, which collided with the last train of the KA 144 Gaya Baru. One passenger died.

On 2 October 2010, an accident occurred between the KA 34 Bima from Gambir Station to Surabaya Gubeng, which collided with the last train of the KA 144 Gaya Baru Malam Selatan from Jakarta Kota to Surabaya Gubeng. This was caused by the train exceeding the clearance limit. As a result, the last train unit of the Gaya Baru Malam Selatan train suffered severe damage, four people were injured, and one person died in hospital.

== Gallery ==
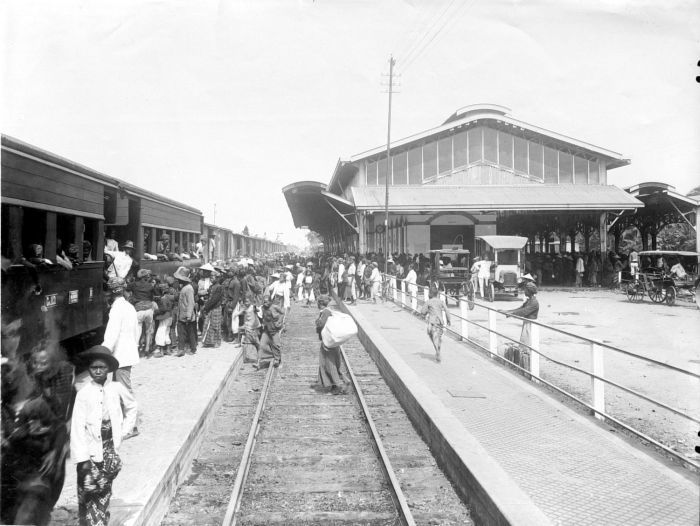
Purwosari Station when it was an island station in 1912-1925 (long before additional overcapping was installed right above the emplacement)

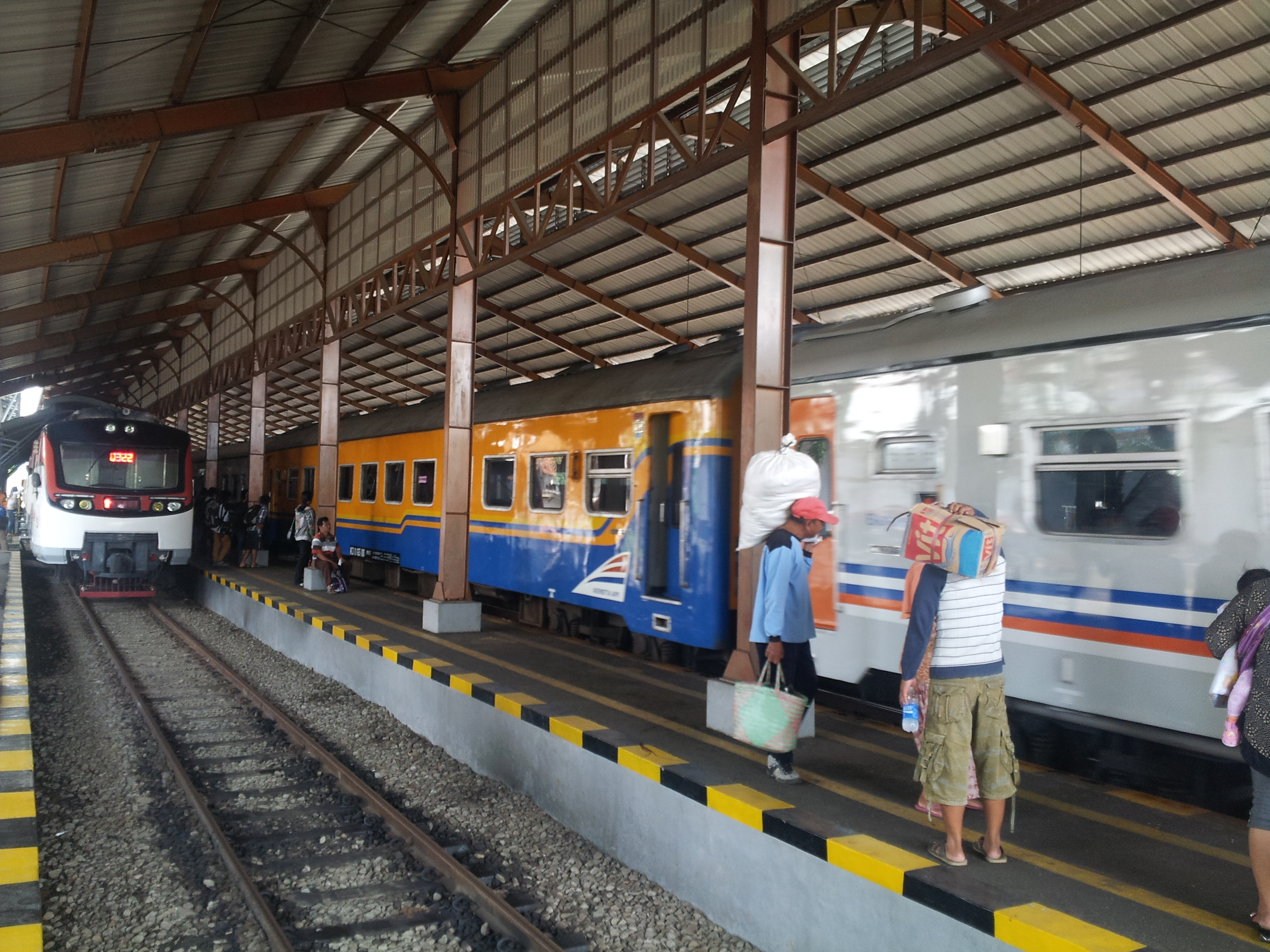
Batara Kresna Railbus and Lagowa train at the station platform

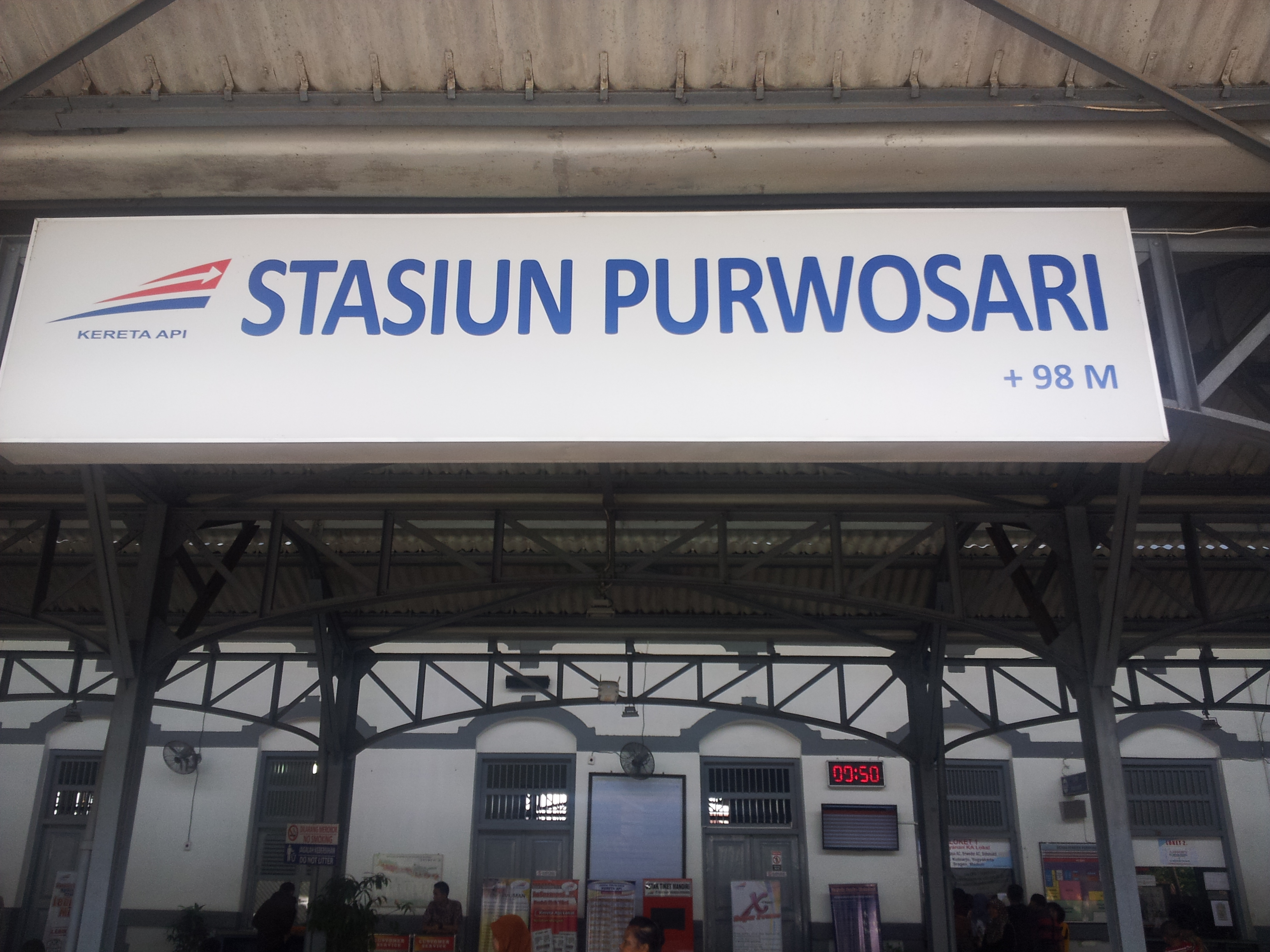
The 2011 version of the Purwosari Station signage

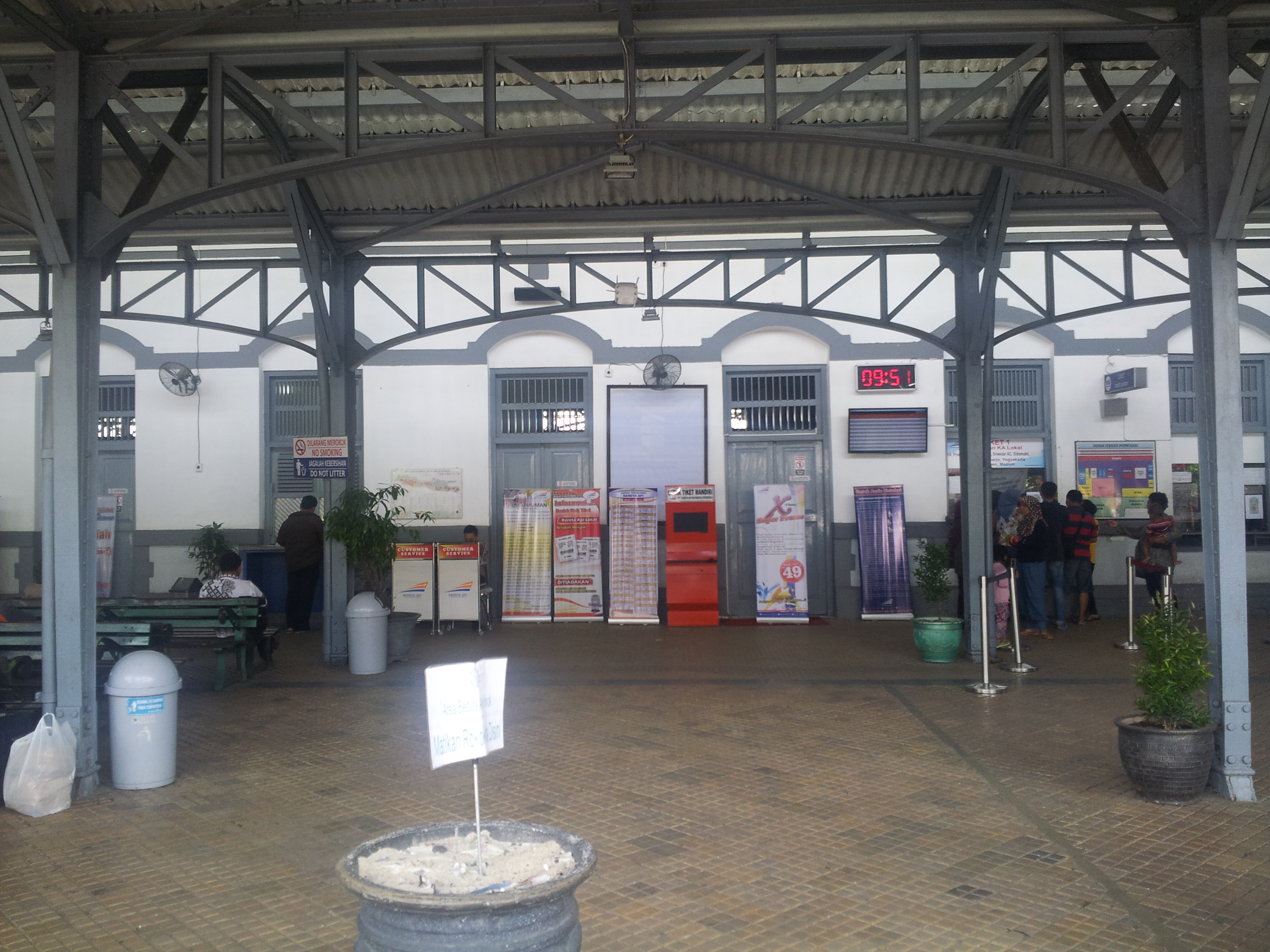
The interior of the station

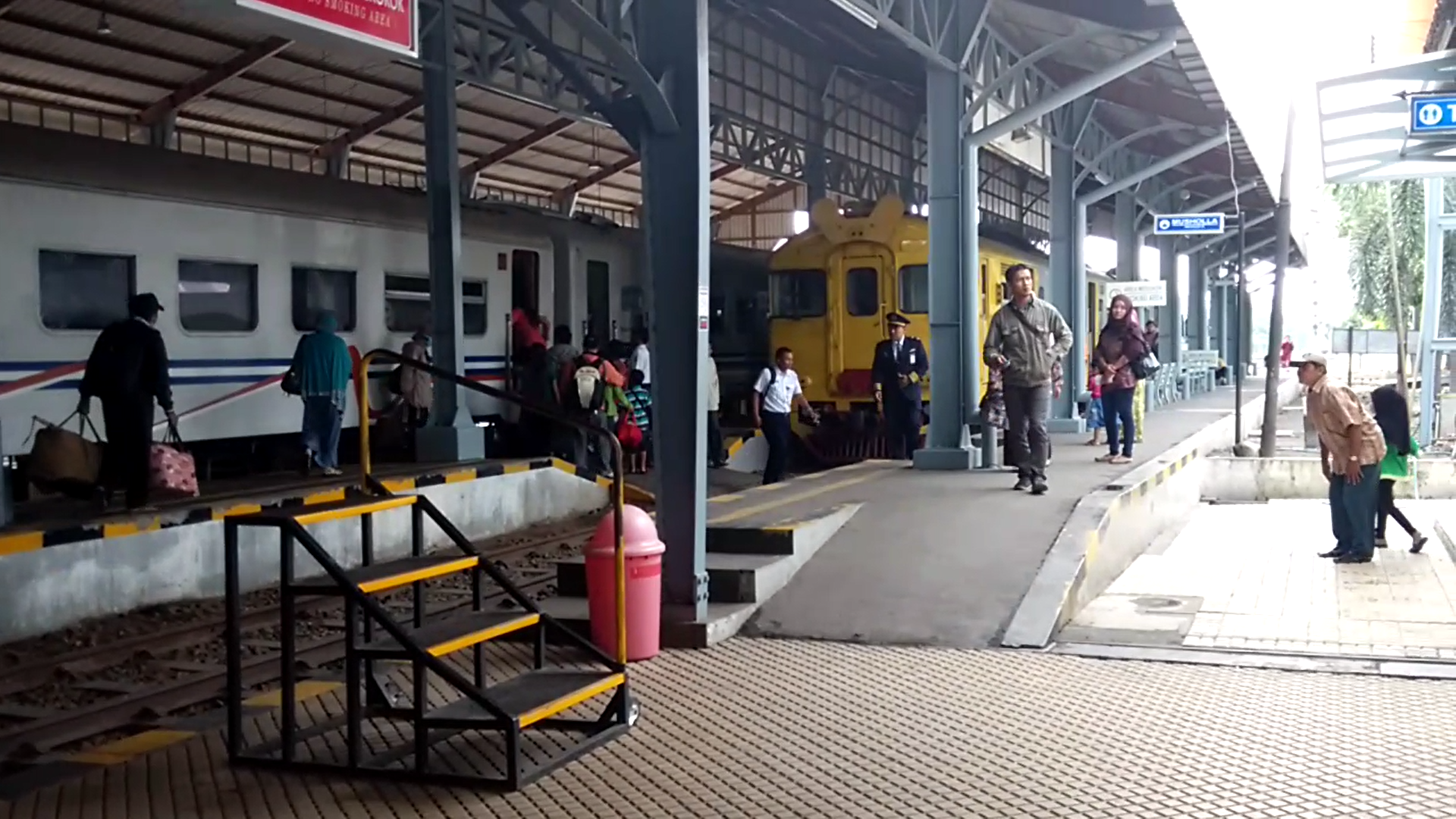
The platform of the station, with the Logawa train on line 2 and Batara Kresna Railbus on line 1 using the Prambanan Express train series

== See also ==
Other railway stations in Surakarta:

- Solo Balapan railway station
- Solo Jebres railway station
- Solo Kota railway station
