= KAI Commuter Yogyakarta Line =

Commuter rail system Between Yogyakarta and Surakarta, Indonesia

Yogyakarta Commuter Line Jogja–Solo Line

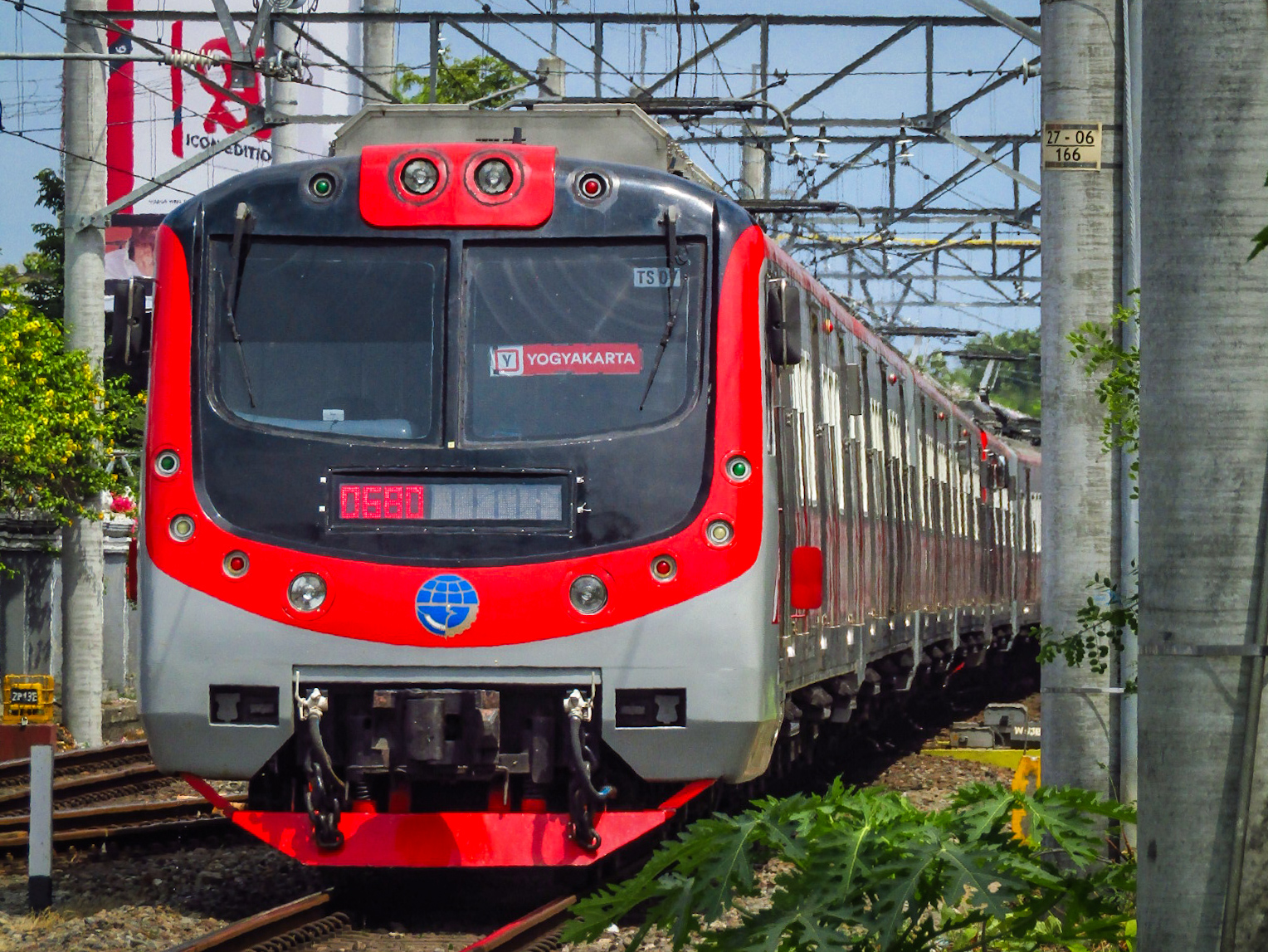
- KFW i9000 type EMU TS-07 bound for Palur leaving Yogyakarta station

Overview
- Owner: Kereta Api Indonesia
- Locale: Special Region of Yogyakarta and Central Java
- Transit type: Commuter rail
- Number of lines: 1
- Number of stations: 13
- Daily ridership: 51,715 (Highest); 27,753 (Average, 2025)
- Annual ridership: 10.13 million (2025)
- Website: commuterline.id

Operation
- Began operation: 10 February 2021; 5 years ago
- Operator: KAI Commuter
- Rolling stock: EA202 series, 205-5000 series
- Train length: 4 and 8 cars per trainset

Technical
- System length: 65.4 km (41 mi)
- Track gauge: 1,067 mm (3 ft 6 in)
- Electrification: 1,500 V DC overhead catenary

KAI Commuter Yogyakarta Line, officially the Yogyakarta Commuter Line, is a commuter rail system in Indonesia serving Greater Yogyakarta in Special Region of Yogyakarta and Greater Surakarta (Solo) in Central Java. Operated by KAI Commuter, subsidiary of the national railway company Kereta Api Indonesia (KAI), it is the first electric-powered commuter rail system in Indonesia outside of Greater Jakarta's Commuterline. The single-line system replaced Yogyakarta-Solo section of diesel-powered commuter rail Prambanan Ekspres (Prameks), also operated by KAI Commuter, on 10 February 2021.

The system has other popular names, such as KRL Commuterline Yogyakarta–Solo, KRL Jogja–Solo, KRL Solo–Jogja or KRL Joglo. "KRL" itself stands for Kereta Rel Listrik (literally "electric rail train" or "electric railcar"), a term for an electric multiple unit train.

== History ==
Planning for an electric commuter rail system between Yogyakarta and Surakarta has been included in the 2030 National Railway Masterplan (Ripnas), compiled by Directorate General of Railways of Indonesian Ministry of Transportation since 2011. According to the masterplan, electrification of the line has entered feasibility study, so construction can be carried out immediately in the future after the study was finished. The limited operation of Prameks, its old-age rolling stock and high ridership is also in consideration. As of 2015, KAI has targeted on Prameks daily ridership of approximately 7,000 passengers per day. The replacement of diesel-powered Prameks with an electric-powered one is expected to increase commuters mobility and support tourism in Yogyakarta–Surakarta region.

In 2016, overhead catenary poles began to be stacked at Solo Jebres Station; since then the construction has stalled for about three years. The construction only continued starting early 2020, with the first poles being erected in Klaten Station.

Starting January 2021, the system underwent series of tests, and became fully operational starting on 10 February 2021. As a consequence, Prameks route will be shortened from previously Solo Balapan-Kutoarjo into Yogyakarta-Kutoarjo vice-versa. The system was officially launched by President Joko Widodo on 1 March 2021.

== Operation ==
As of 2022, KAI Commuter Yogyakarta Line serves 13 stations across Greater Yogyakarta and Greater Surakarta, with terminus at Yogyakarta Station, Solo Balapan Station, and Palur Station. Some stations has rail and intermodal connection with Prambanan Ekspres, Batara Kresna railbus, Yogyakarta International Airport Rail Link and Adisumarmo Airport Rail Link, as well as bus rapid transit systems (Trans Jogja and Batik Solo Trans) and bus terminals (Tirtonadi Bus Terminal in Surakarta and Ir. Soekarno Bus Terminal in Klaten).

Passengers may purchase ticket using multiple trip card called Kartu Multi-Trip (KMT, "multitrip card"), bank-issued e-money cards (Mandiri e-Money, BRI BRIZZI, BNI TapCash, and BCA Flazz are accepted) or QR code payment provided by e-wallet provider such as Gopay for a single-fare of Rp 8,000. KMT itself is priced at Rp 30,000 (including Rp 10,000 credit). Unlike its Greater Jakarta counterpart, the system never offered single-trip card.

== Stations ==
Geographic map of the KAI Commuter Yogyakarta Line

Station Number	Station	From previous station	From Yogyakarta Termini	Transfers/Notes	Location	
Y01; P01; YA01; JS05	Yogyakarta	-	0.0	Terminal station Intercity trains Prambanan Ekspres Yogyakarta International Airport Rail Link Trans Jogja: Line 1A, Line 2A, Line 8 (Mangkubumi 2/Hotel Grand Zuri); Line 1A, Line 2A, Line 3A, Line 8, Line 10 (Malioboro 1) Teman Bus Godean Line (front Hotel Abadi Malioboro)	Yogyakarta	Special Region of Yogyakarta
Y02; JS04	Lempuyangan			Intercity trains Trans Jogja: Line 4A, Line 4B, Line 10 (Stasiun Lempuyangan)	Yogyakarta	Special Region of Yogyakarta
Y03	Maguwo			Adisucipto International Airport Trans Jogja: Line 1A, Line 1B, Line 3A, Line 3B, Line 5B, Teman Bus Pakem (via Tajem) Line (Bandara Adisucipto)	Sleman Regency	Special Region of Yogyakarta
Y04	Brambanan			Trans Jogja Line 1A (Terminal Prambanan via short walk)	Klaten Regency	Central Java
Y05	Srowot				Klaten Regency	Central Java
Y06; JS02; AS01	Klaten			Intercity trains Adisumarmo Airport Rail Link Ir. Soekarno Bus Terminal (via short walk)	Klaten Regency	Central Java
Y07	Ceper				Klaten Regency	Central Java
Y08	Delanggu				Klaten Regency	Central Java
Y09	Gawok				Sukoharjo Regency	Central Java
Y10; BK01; AS02	Purwosari			Intercity trains Batara Kresna Railbus Adisumarmo Airport Rail Link Batik Solo Trans: Corridor 2 (Purwosari) Sepur Kluthuk Jaladara	Surakarta	Central Java
Y11; JS01; AS03	Solo Balapan			Intercity trains Adisumarmo Airport Rail Link Batik Solo Trans: Corridor 2 (Balapan Utara on eastward only, Balapan Selatan on westward only); Corridor 4 (Terminal Tirtonadi, via skybridge) Tirtonadi Bus Terminal (via skybridge)	Surakarta	Central Java
Y12	Solo Jebres			Intercity trains Batik Solo Trans: Corridor 1 Corridor 3	Surakarta	Central Java
Y13	Palur			Terminal station Batik Solo Trans: Corridor 1 Corridor 2 Corridor 4 Corridor 10	Karanganyar Regency	Central Java

== Rolling stock ==
KAI Commuter Yogyakarta Line is using sets of EA202 (i9000 KfW) series EMU for its operation. EA202 series was formerly used on KAI Commuter Tanjung Priok Line, then was fully refurbished by INKA for Yogyakarta Line usage. Two 4-car sets of JR 205 series (205-5000 series, set 9 & 32) was operated to overcome the shortage of EA202 sets, some of which at the time of EMU launch was still refurbished by INKA. As it became redundant by September 2022, KAI Commuter decided to send back these sets to Jakarta region. As per 2023, the JR 205 9+32 sets currently operated for Bogor Line only. To assist with the i9000 series Electric Train tasks on the Yogyakarta-Palur route. in early August 2025, KAI Commuter delivered two JR 205 series KRL trainsets to Solo Jebres. The two trainsets delivered were JR 205-5 and JR 205-46, transported in three separate shipments, each consisting of eight carriages without a central cabin. The JR 205-5 and JR 205-46 KRL trains, previously designated as belonging to Depok (DP), have now been officially designated as belonging to Solo Jebres (SK).

Women only cars (Kereta Khusus Wanita/KKW, in Indonesian) are not present in KAI Commuter Yogyakarta Line. On further note, KKW was once introduced in Prameks (on ex-Holec DEMU and MCW DHMU) but was later abolished.

Class	Internal name	Image	Cars per set	Builder	Remark
i9000 series	EA202		4+4	(Germany) - (Indonesia) INKA, Bombardier (2011) Refurbished by INKA (2019-2020)	Financed by KfW, all transferred from Commuterline Jakarta branch
205-5000 series	JR 205-46		8	(Japan) Nippon Sharyo (1984–1994)	205-5000 ex-JR East, which some transferred from Commuterline Jakarta branch
Transferred to KRL Commuterline
205-5000 series (205 series, 5000 subseries variant)	N/A		4+4	(Japan) Nippon Sharyo, Kawasaki Heavy Industries, Hitachi, Ltd., Kinki Sharyo, Tokyu Car Corporation (1985-1986, formerly Yamanote Line cars replaced by E231-500 series were refurbished in 2002-2008 with newly installed traction motors for Musashino Line)	ex-Musashino Line rolling stock, returned to Commuterline Jakarta branch. Currently operated for Bogor Line only.

== See also ==
- Rail transport in Indonesia
- KRL Commuterline
- KAI Commuter
- Yogyakarta metropolitan area
- Surakarta metropolitan area
