= Klewer Market =

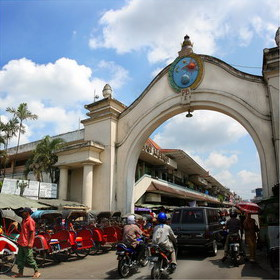
Klewer Market gate

Klewer Market (Indonesian: Pasar Klewer, Javanese: ꦥꦱꦂꦏ꧀ꦭꦺꦮꦺꦂ, romanized: Pasar Klèwèr) is the largest textile market in Surakarta, Central Java, Indonesia. The market, which is located beside the Kraton Surakarta complex, is also a shopping center for batik traders from Yogyakarta, Surabaya, Semarang and other cities in Java. This market have two floors and can accommodate 1,467 traders with a number of stalls around 2,064 units. Klewer market acts not only as a center of economy, but also a tourist destination and a symbol of Solo city.

== 27 December 2014 Fire ==
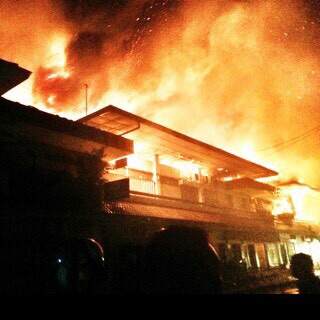
Fire broke out at Saturday night.

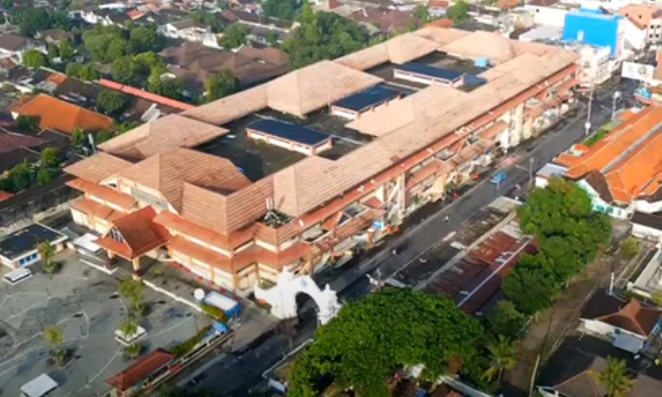
Pasar Klewer market from north-east side, 2024.

On 27 December 2014 evening, the whole market was burned down.
