= Jaka Tingkir (train) =

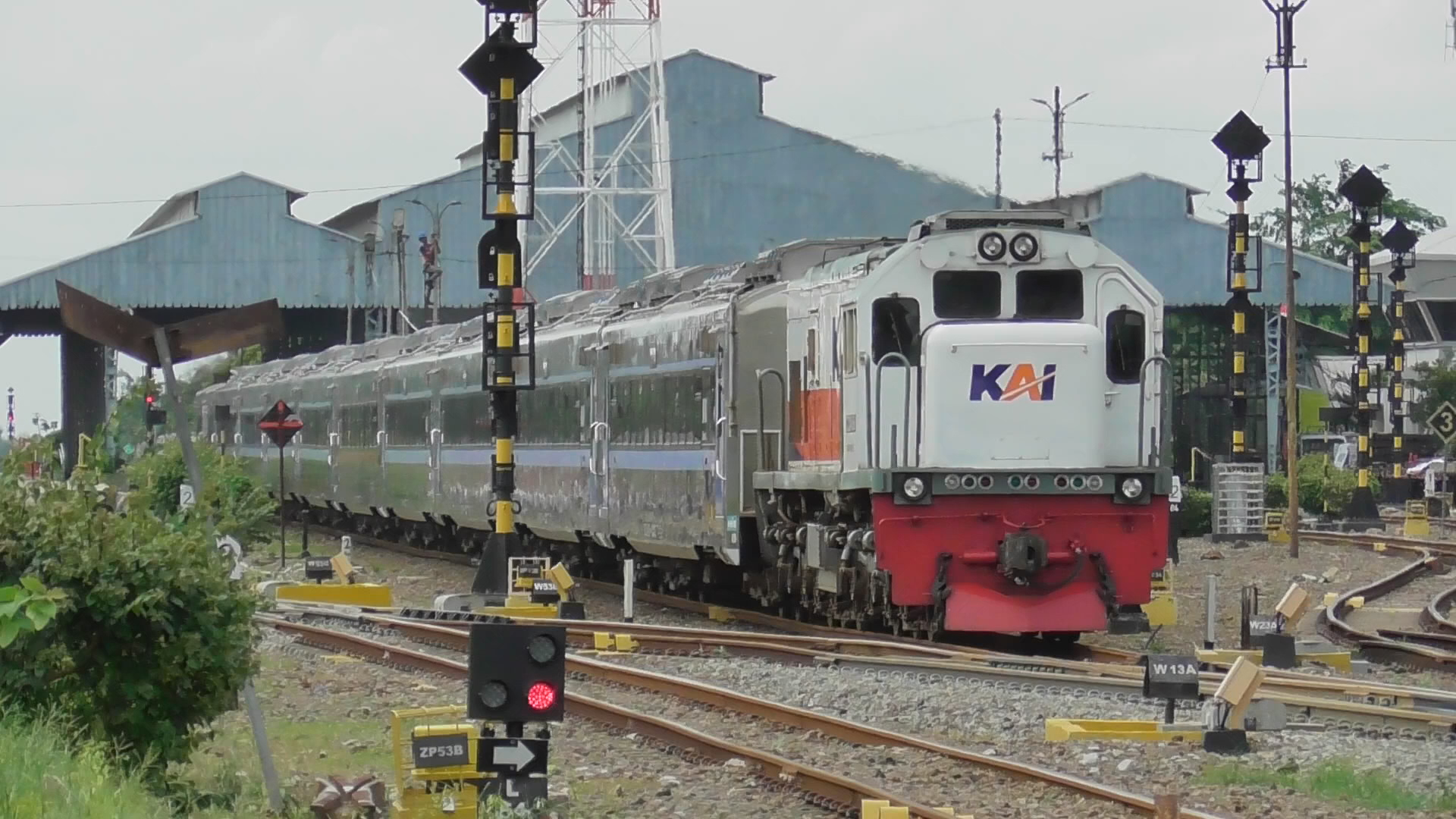
- Jaka Tingkir train passed in Cikampek, 2024

Overview
- Service type: Inter-city rail
- Status: Operational
- Locale: Operational Area VI Yogyakarta
- Predecessor: Bengawan addition
- First service: 8 December 2013
- Current operator: Kereta Api Indonesia

Route
- Termini: Pasar Senen; Solo Balapan
- Distance travelled: 570 kilometres (350 miles)
- Average journey time: 8 hours 9 minutes
- Service frequency: daily each way
- Train number: 255-256

On-board services
- Class: economy
- Seating arrangements: 72 seats arranged 2-2 (economy class)
- Catering facilities: On-board cafe and trolley service

Technical
- Rolling stock: CC203; CC201
- Track gauge: 1,067 mm
- Operating speed: 80–120 kilometres per hour (50–75 mph)
Route map

Jaka Tingkir train is an intercity rail passenger train operated by Kereta Api Indonesia (KAI) on Java. The service runs from Pasar Senen in Jakarta to Solo Balapan in Surakarta via Purwokerto and Lempuyangan in Yogyakarta. It is an air-conditioned, non-subsidised economy service, and was introduced to help meet high weekend demand for travel from the Yogyakarta and Solo region to Jakarta.

== History ==
Jaka Tingkir was introduced by Kereta Api Indonesia to meet high passenger demand during weekends, especially for travel between Central Java, Yogyakarta, and Jakarta. The service officially began operating on 8 December 2013, departing from Solo Jebres and Lempuyangan with Pasar Senen as its main destination. At that time, the train was operated only on specific days and used non-subsidized air-conditioned economy coaches. The train name is taken from "Joko Tingkir", a popular name associated with Sultan Hadiwijaya of the Pajang Sultanate.

Since 1 December 2018, the service route of this train was shortened so that it only served the Lempuyangan–Pasar Senen route because some of the train sets had been used for the full operation of the Joglosemarkerto and Kamandaka lines.

Cross-services were changed to their original state starting 1 December 2019, in line with the implementation of the enactment of new train travel chart 2019.

In 2024, KAI announced that Jaka Tingkir would begin using modified economy "New Generation" rolling stock, with the work carried out at Manggarai Railway Workshop, and the service was scheduled to operate with this formation starting in late July 2024.

Starting 1 February 2025, under the enactment of the 2025 train travel chart, the route of Jaka Tingkir was officially extended from Purwosari to Solo Balapan. This extension was intended to improve connectivity and support other long-distance services operating on the same corridor.

== Stations ==
Jaka Tingkir train route is:

- Pasar Senen (Start/End)
- Jatinegara
- Cikarang
- Haurgeulis
- Jatibarang
- Cirebon Prujakan
- Bumiayu
- Purwokerto
- Kroya
- Gombong
- Kebumen
- Kutowinangun
- Kutoarjo
- Wates
- Lempuyangan
- Klaten
- Purwosari
- Solo Balapan (Start/End)
