= Brambanan railway station =

Railway station in Indonesia

Y04 Brambanan Station Stasiun Brambanan
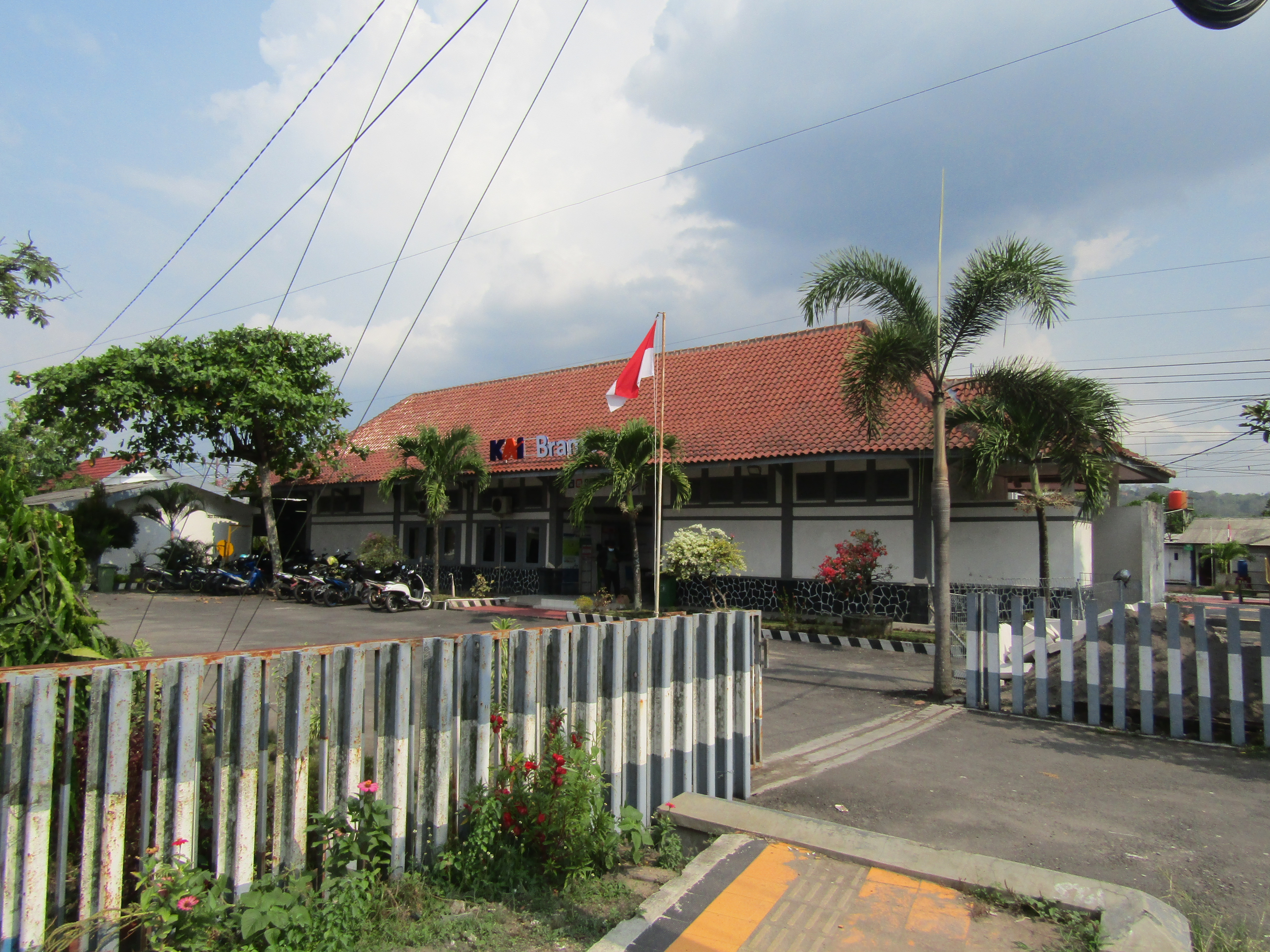
- Brambanan Station, as of 2021

General information
- Other names: Prambanan Station
- Location: Jl. Stasiun Prambanan, Kebondalem Kidul, Prambanan, Klaten Regency; Central Java; Indonesia
- Coordinates: 7.756556°S 110.500472°E
- Elevation: +146 m (479 ft)
- Owner: Kereta Api Indonesia
- Operator: KAI Commuter
- Lines: Yogyakarta Line; Kutoarjo–Purwosari
- Platforms: 1 side platform 2 island platforms
- Tracks: 4

Construction
- Structure type: Ground
- Parking: Available
- Accessible: Available

Other information
- Station code: BBN • 3103
- Classification: Class I

History
- Opened: 10 June 1872
- Electrified: 2020

Services
Preceding station		Following station
Maguwo towards Yogyakarta	Yogyakarta Line	Srowot towards Palur
Location
- Location within Java

Brambanan Station (BBN) also known as Prambanan Station, is a class I railway station located in Kebondalem Kidul, Prambanan, Klaten Regency, Central Java, Indonesia; about 750 meter from Prambanan Temple complex. The station, which is the westernmost railway station in the regency, is at an altitude of +146 meters and operated by Operational Area VI Yogyakarta of Kereta Api Indonesia (KAI). The station road connects this station with the Solo-Yogyakarta highway.

For a long time, the station served as a cement freight station. Since 26 June 2016, it also serves passenger services; initially via Prambanan Express before it was replaced with KAI Commuter Yogyakarta Line starting on 10 February 2021.

Although the surrounding area is known as Prambanan, according to data from the Nederlandsch-Indische Spoorweg Maatschappij (NIS) the station's name is written as Brambanan and has not changed since then.

== Building and layout ==
Initially, this station probably had four railway tracks with line 1 being a straight line. Since the operation of the Yogyakarta-Solo partial double track as the Srowot-Ketandan segment in 2001 and completed as the Brambanan-Delanggu segment on 15 December 2003, line 2 of this station was made into as a straight line from Solo. As of 2005–2006 and fully completed in 2007, line 1 of this station has completely become a straight line towards Yogyakarta. Line 4 is used as a storage rail for freight train parking.

The old station building, which was previously similar to Srowot Station and a legacy of the DKA (Djawatan Kereta Api), collapsed in the 2006 Yogyakarta earthquake. As its replacement, the current station building was built by the Directorate General of Railways.

This station is on the Prambanan plain, so it is located close to various important ancient buildings, such as Prambanan Temple, Sewu Temple, Ratu Boko Complex, Sojiwan Temple, and Plaosan Temple; apart from other smaller temples.

To the west of this station, before Maguwo Station, there was Kalasan Station which has been inactive since the double tracks Kutoarjo-Solo Balapan operates.

To support double tracks operations, the mechanical signaling system at this station was replaced with an artificial electric signaling system PT Len Industri (Persero) which had been installed since 2013 and only started operation on 1 October 2018.

Since 2020 this station has also been equipped with Overhead catenary as part of the line electrification Yogyakarta-Solo Balapan railway station

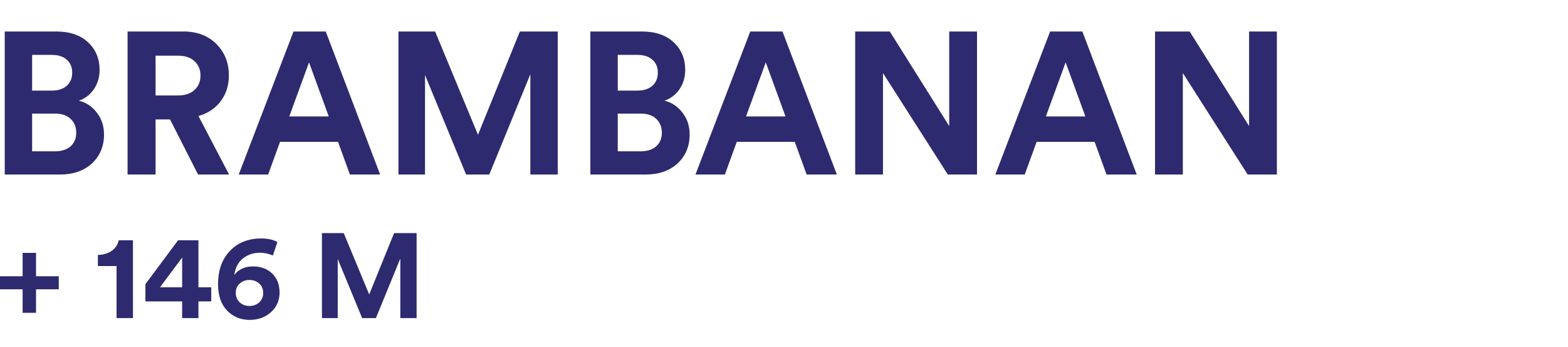
Y04
G
Main building
P
Platform floor
Side platform the doors are opened on the right side
Line 1
← (Maguwo) Yogyakarta Line to Yogyakarta

Straight tracks to Yogyakarta

Island platform
Line 2
Yogyakarta Line to Solo Balapan (Srowot) →

Straight tracks to Solo Balapan

Island platform
Line 3
Additional lane for overtaking
Line 4
Cement unloading and loading area

== Services ==
The following is a list of train services at the Brambanan Station.

=== Passenger services ===
- Yogyakarta Line, to Yogyakarta, Solo Balapan, and Palur

=== Freight services ===
- Indocement, the destination of
  - Arjawinangun via Solo Balapan-Semarang Poncol-Cirebon Prujakan
  - Nambo via Solo Balapan-Semarang Poncol-Cirebon Prujakan

== Incidents ==
- On 27 May 2006, an earthquake shook the Special Region of Yogyakarta and its surroundings. The earthquake also collapsed the Brambanan Station building. Only the floor, toilets, and signal room remained.

Preceding station	Kereta Api Indonesia	Following station
Kalasan towards Kutoarjo	Kutoarjo–Purwosari	Srowot towards Purwosari
