= Palur railway station =

Railway station in Indonesia

Y13 Palur Station Stasiun Palur
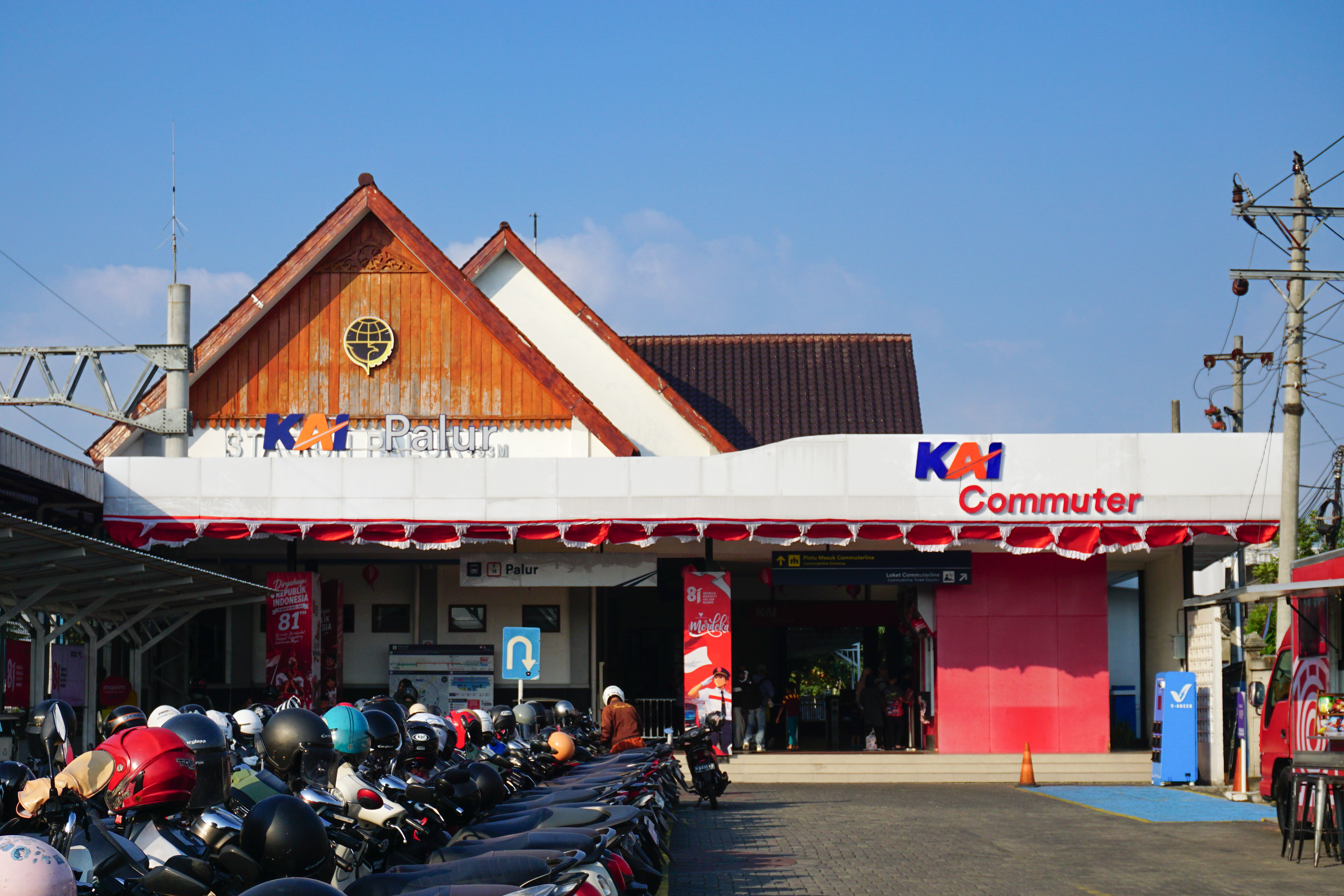
- Palur Station new building and footpath as of 2026

General information
- Location: Dagen, Jaten, Karanganyar Regency; Central Java; Indonesia
- Coordinates: 7.5680388°S 110.8753967°E
- Elevation: +93 m (305 ft)
- Owner: Kereta Api Indonesia
- Operator: KAI Commuter
- Lines: KAI Commuter Yogyakarta Line; Solo Balapan–Kertosono
- Platforms: 3 (1 side platform and 2 island platforms)
- Tracks: 4

Construction
- Structure type: Ground
- Parking: Available
- Accessible: Available

Other information
- Station code: PL • 4001
- Classification: Class III

History
- Electrified: 2021-22

Services
| Preceding station | | Following station |
|---|---|---|
| Solo Jebres towards Yogyakarta | Yogyakarta Line | Terminus |
Location
- Location within Java

Palur Station (PL) is a class-III railway station located in Dagen, Jaten, Karanganyar Regency, Central Java, Indonesia. The station is located at an altitude of +93 meters and only serves KAI Commuter Yogyakarta Line. The station is about 100 meters to the northeast from Karanganyar main highway (Jalan Raya Karanganyar) and not far from the national highway linking nearby city of Surakarta and Surabaya in East Java.

The station was built by Staatsspoorwegen, originally with three tracks. After the double track to Kedungbanteng began operation on 5 March 2019 and to Solo Jebres on 20 August 2019, the number of tracks became four. The Staatsspoorwegen-built building was demolished to make way for the tracks, and replaced with a new building located southeast of the old one.

Palur Station was previously serving Prambanan Express commuter rail to Yogyakarta until December 2011. Between 2021 and 2022, the railway electrification extended into the station, as the preparation for the planned extension of KAI Commuter Yogyakarta Line. On 17 August 2022 the station, alongside Solo Jebres, underwent a public trial of the Yogyakarta Line service, and officially opened shortly thereafter. The station become the easternmost station served by the line.

== Station layout ==
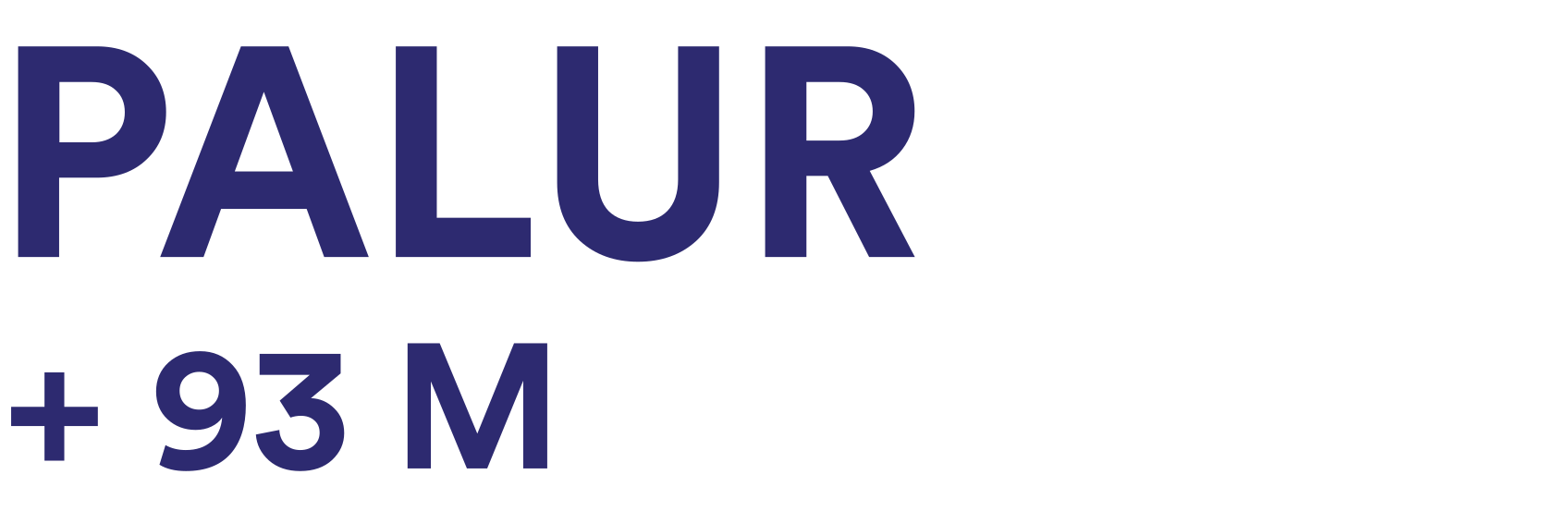
Y13
| | Buffer stop |
| P Platform floor | Line 4 | ← (Solo Jebres) Yogyakarta Line from and towards Yogyakarta |
| P Platform floor | Island platform, the doors are opened on the left side |
| P Platform floor | Line 3 | Straight tracks to Solo Balapan |
| P Platform floor | Line 2 | Straight tracks to Madiun |
| P Platform floor | Island platform, the doors are opened on the right side |
| P Platform floor | Line 1 | ← (Solo Jebres) Yogyakarta Line from and towards Yogyakarta |
| P Platform floor | Side platform, the doors are opened on the left side |
| G | Main building |

== Services ==
- Yogyakarta Line, to Yogyakarta

== Supporting transportation ==
| Type | Route | Destination | Notes |
|---|---|---|---|
| Batik Solo Trans | K1S | Adisumarmo International Airport–Palur | Transfer at Palur bus terminal |
| Batik Solo Trans | K2S | Kerten–Palur | Transfer at Palur bus terminal |
| Batik Solo Trans | K4S | Kartasura–Tirtonadi–Palur | Transfer at Palur bus terminal |
| Batik Solo Trans | 10FS | Pasar Klewer–Palur | Transfer at Palur bus terminal |

== Gallery ==
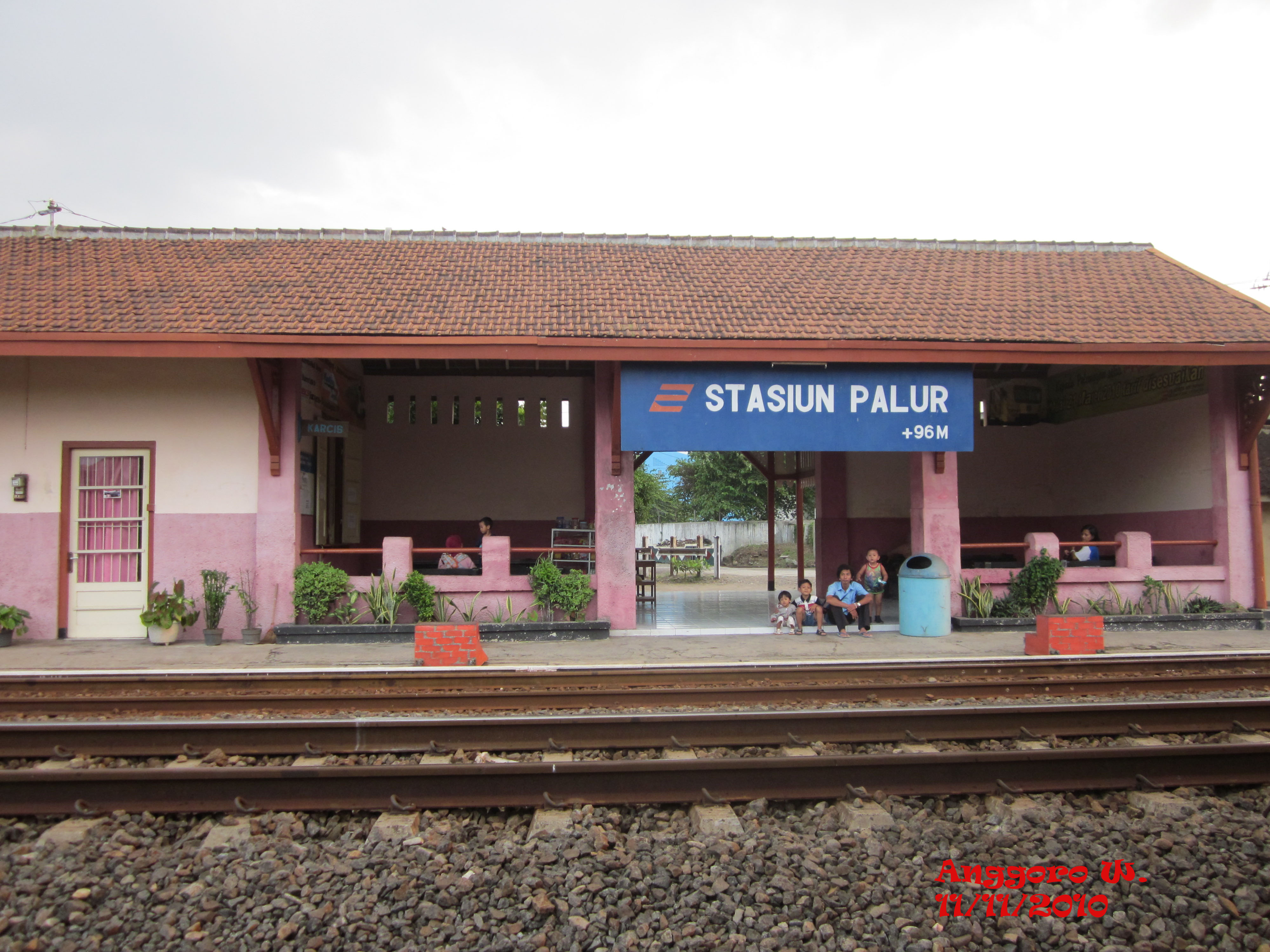
The old building and elevation of the station in 2010

| Preceding station | Kereta Api Indonesia | Following station |
|---|---|---|
| Solo Jebres towards Solo Balapan | Solo Balapan–Kertosono | Kemiri towards Kertosono |
