= Argo Sindoro =

Passenger train service between Jakarta and Semarang, Indonesia

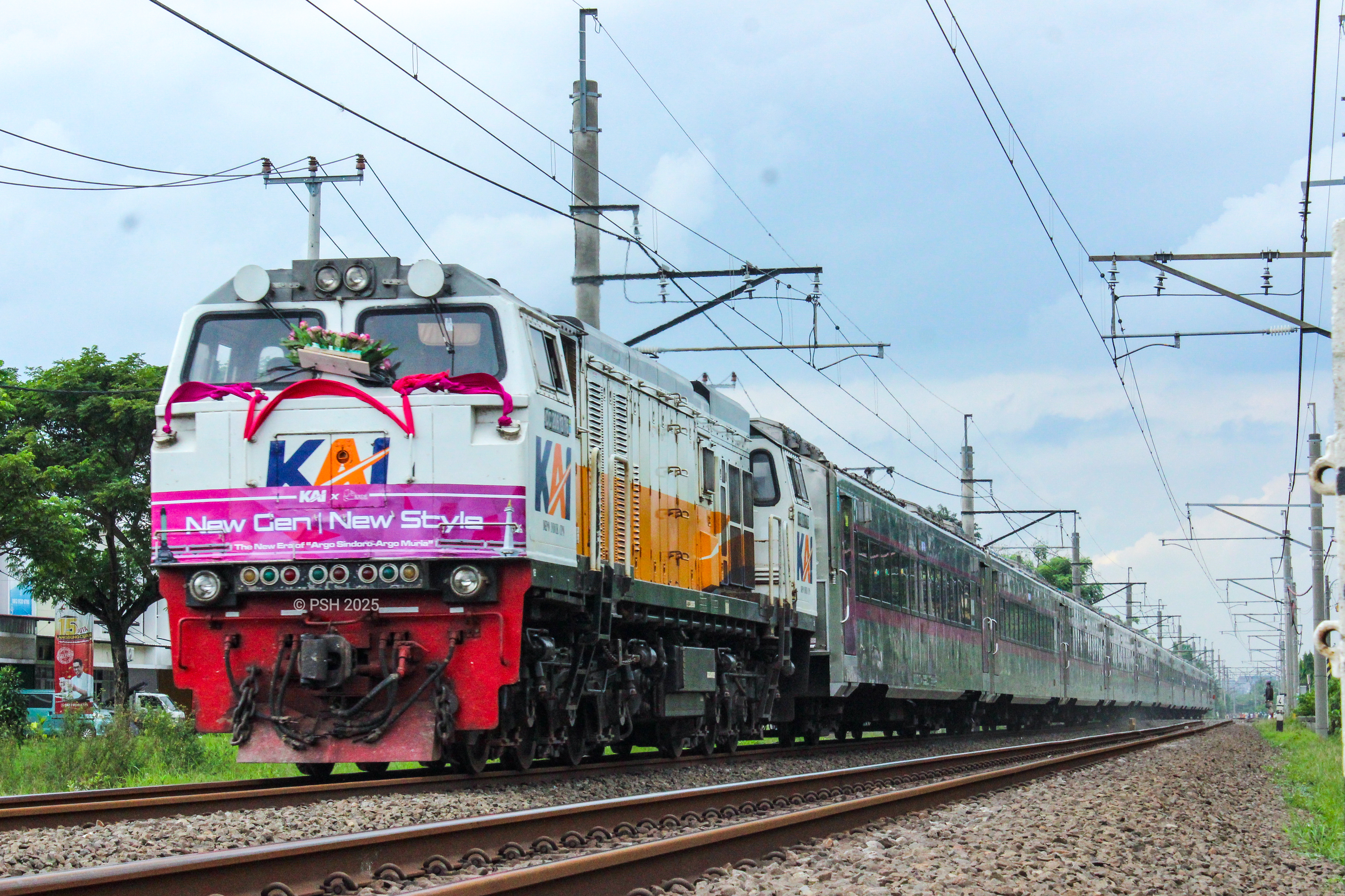
- Argo Sindoro 17 with the New Generation & the flower at the locomotive, 2025

Overview
- Service type: Inter-city rail
- Status: Operational
- First service: 17 March 2007
- Current operator: Kereta Api Indonesia

Route
- Termini: Semarang Tawang Bank Jateng; Gambir
- Distance travelled: 440 km (273 mil)
- Average journey time: 5 hours 11 minutes
- Service frequency: 3x daily each way
- Train number: 17-19

On-board services
- Class: executive
- Seating arrangements: 50 seats arranged 2-2 (executive class)
- Catering facilities: On-board cafe and trolley service

Technical
- Rolling stock: CC206
- Track gauge: 1067 mm
- Operating speed: 88 - 120 km/h (54-75 mph)
Route map

Argo Sindoro is a passenger train service operated by Kereta Api Indonesia on the route between Semarang Tawang and Jakarta Gambir. It is an executive train that runs three trips daily in each direction, covering 440 kilometres (270 mi) in 5 hours 11 minutes.

This train also complements the Argo Muria, which serves the same route but operates on a different schedule.

== Etymology ==
The word Argo (Javanese for "mountain") is a brand name used for executive train services operated by Kereta Api Indonesia. The name Sindoro is derived from Mount Sindoro, located in Temanggung Regency, Central Java.

== History ==
=== Introduction (2007) ===
The Argo Sindoro was first operated by KAI on 17 March 2007 using train sets with K9 bogies. However, since 2002, both services had been operated with executive-class train sets manufactured by PT INKA in the 2002 edition. The earlier train sets were reassigned to operate the Argo Lawu in 2004. Because the Argo Lawu frequently experienced derailments during operation, the train sets were transferred back to the Semarang Poncol Train Depot in 2007, as trains with K9 bogies were not suitable for the central and southern lines of Java, which are steeper and more winding.

Since 2007, the Argo Muria I service was renamed Argo Sindoro when it returned to operation using train sets with K9 bogies, a configuration it retained until the sets were refurbished in the early 2010s.

=== Argo Sindoro (2008-present) ===
At the end of 2018, the Argo Sindoro began operating with a new series of stainless steel executive trains manufactured by PT INKA and released that same year. The older 2002 executive trains, after being refurbished, were reassigned to support the operation of the Ciremai train.

In April 2019, both the Argo Sindoro and Argo Muria returned to service using K9 bogie trains, which had previously been employed on the Argo Bromo Anggrek.

After operating with used K9 bogie trains belonging to the Argo Bromo Anggrek, these 2018 executive trains were transferred to Jakarta Kota Station (JAKK) to operate the Argo Lawu.

After return operate as the impact of the COVID-19 pandemic in Indonesia was ended, the Argo Muria & Argo Sindoro return use the executive trains made by PT INKA, produced in 2016, previously owned by Bima and Argo Dwipangga, belonging to the JAKK depot and SLO depot.

Like with the Argo Muria (but difference schedule), the Argo Sindoro schedule and the Argo Sindoro Additional train departing from Semarang Tawang Station at 06.15 (11 AM train I) and 06.50 (7001 AM train II) and the departure schedule from Gambir Station at 13.05 (7002 PM train) and 16.40 (12 PM train), the difference between the Regular Argo Sindoro and the Additional Argo Sindoro is in the service price, train series, train speed, travel time and limited train travel schedule (for the Additional Argo Sindoro).

Specifically for the Argo Muria, every weekend the train line is increased from the original 9 executive cars to 10 executive cars, while for the Argo Sindoro, no executive cars are added.

On 28 September 2022, following the 77th birthday of KAI, the Argo Muria and Argo Sindoro increased the speed of the train from 105 km/h (65 mph) to 120 km/h (75 mph).

On 1 June 2023 following the enactment of new train travel chart 2023, The Argo Sindoro has now increased to three daily departures, with one departure from Jakarta in the evening and two departures from Semarang in the morning and evening. The Argo Sindoro to Semarang now stops at Jatinegara Station, providing an alternative service for the Jabodetabek.

After the six flagship trains such as the Argo Bromo Anggrek, Argo Semeru–Bima, Argo Lawu–Argo Dwipangga, and Taksaka received the latest generation of stainless steel trains made by PT INKA, on 15 June 2025, the Argo Sindoro & Argo Muria officially uses the new generation executive train series made by PT INKA, while the previous series was transferred to the Argo Merbabu.

== List of the Station ==
On 1 February 2025 following the enactment of new train travel chart 2025, the Argo Sindoro 19 replacing the Argo Muria 20 in the schedule.

- Semarang Tawang Bank Jateng (Start/End)
- Pekalongan
- Tegal
- Cirebon
- Bekasi
- Jatinegara (Only for departures towards Semarang on the evening schedule, while the opposite direction is only for arrivals on the morning and evening schedules)
- Gambir (Start/End)

== Accident & Incident ==
- On 21 June 2022 at 10.55 local time, the Argo Sindoro crashed into a Toyota Avanza car at the illegal crossing Mekarsari, Walet, South Tambun. Tragically, the car was dragged for about 1.2 km before entering Tambun, causing the driver's death.
- On 29 April 2023 at 06.45 local time, Two students who were on their way to school were killed after being hit by the Argo Sindoro at the PJL 65 crossing in Nawangsari Village, Weleri District, Kendal Regency. It is suspected that the victims were in a hurry to catch up on the lateness to get to school. As a result, the Argo Sindoro train made an extraordinary stop (BLB) on track 3 Weleri Station.

== See also ==
- Semarang
- Argo Muria
