= Argo Merbabu =

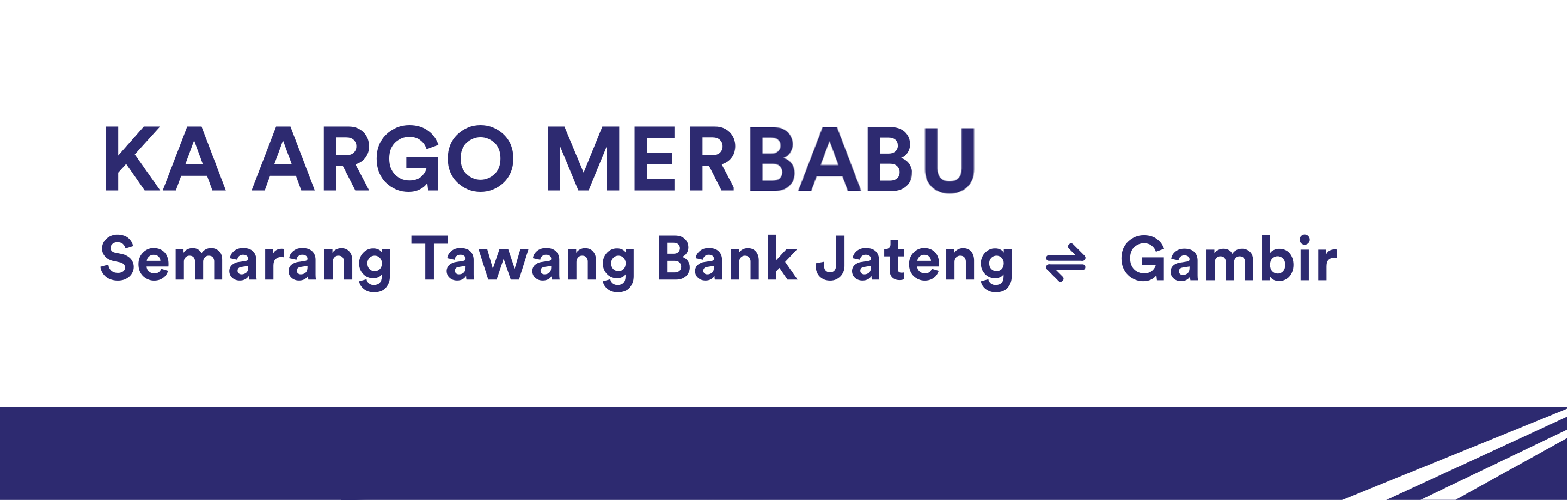

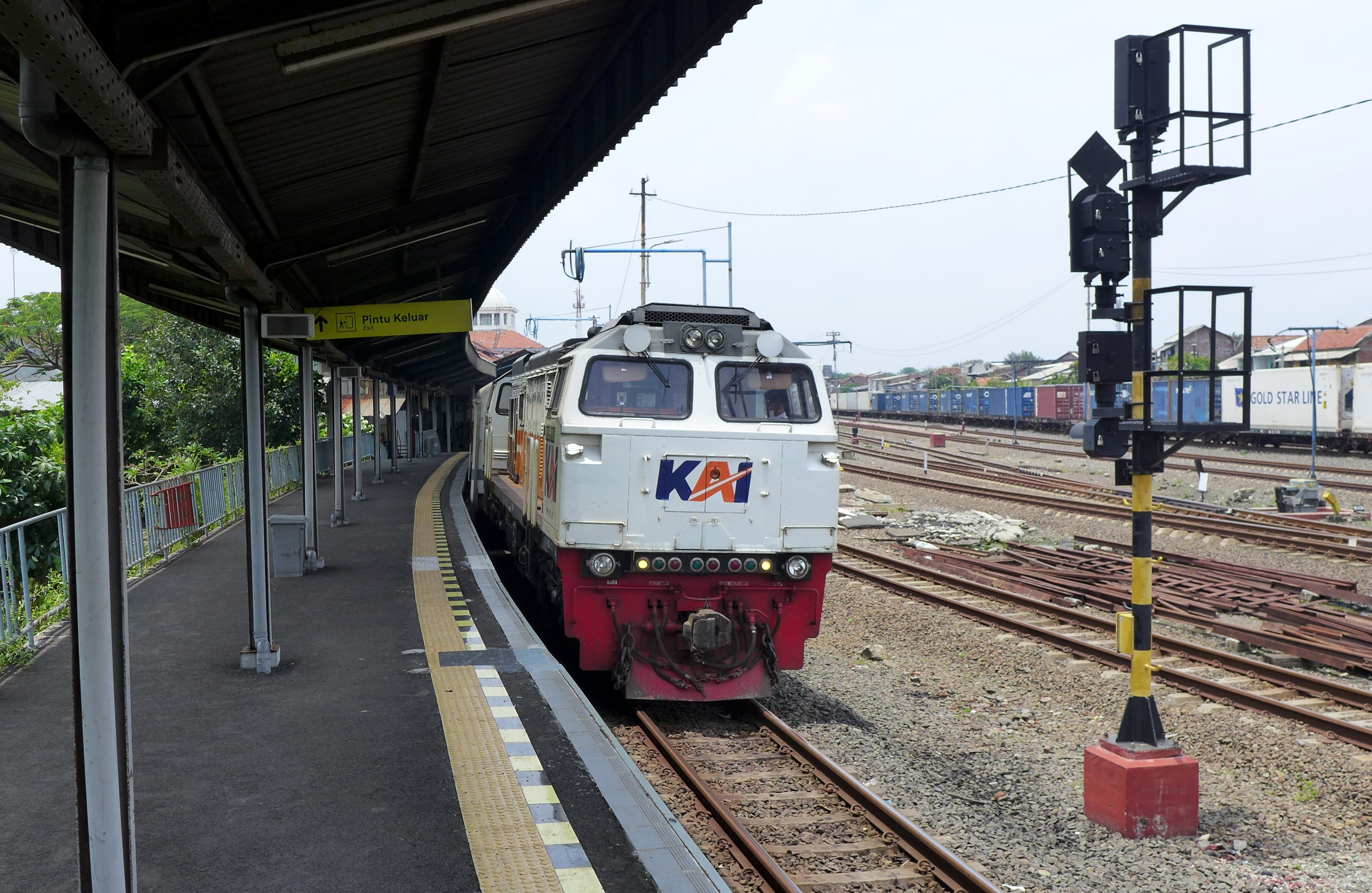
- Argo Merbabu 26 arrived at Semarang Tawang, 2025

Overview
- Service type: Inter-city rail
- Status: Not Operating
- First service: 1 June 2023
- Last service: 30 September 2026
- Successor: Muria
- Current operator: Kereta Api Indonesia

Route
- Termini: Gambir; Semarang Tawang Bank Jateng
- Distance travelled: 440 km (273 mil)
- Average journey time: 5 hours 18 minutes
- Service frequency: 3x daily each way
- Train number: 23-28

On-board services
- Class: executive
- Seating arrangements: 50 seats arranged 2-2 (executive class)
- Catering facilities: On-board cafe and trolley service

Technical
- Rolling stock: CC206
- Track gauge: 1067 mm
- Operating speed: 80 km/h (50 mph) to 120 km/h (75 mph)
Route map

Argo Merbabu was a passenger train operated by Kereta Api Indonesia which runs between Gambir and Semarang Tawang Bank Jateng. There are three trains a day covering the 440 km (273 mil) in 5 hours 18 minutes.

== History ==
On 1 June 2023 following the enactment of new train travel chart 2023, PT KAI launching of the Argo Merbabu with executive "New Image" that connecting between Jakarta Gambir & Semarang Tawang. This route is the same with the Argo Muria & Sindoro, but difference facilities of them, for this trip around 5 hours 59 minutes at the time and now starting in July, this train operates regularly with trains departing from Semarang in the morning and vice versa in the afternoon.

The Argo Merbabu is the successor to the Semarang-Jakarta route service which since 2017 has been operating with "Additional Train" status, namely the Additional Argo Sindoro.

On 10 December 2024, the Argo Merbabu which originally used a series of light steel production in the 1995s and 2002s, was replaced with a series of light steel production in 2016 and 2017 (known as new image) which is a legacy of the Pandalungan Gambir–Jember connection via the northern route of Java, because the Pandalungan train already has a series of stainless steel from the Bima and Argo Semeru which from Gambir to Surabaya Gubeng.

After Argo Sindoro and Argo Muria received the latest generation stainless steel train made by PT INKA, the Argo Merbabu train got a series from Argo Sindoro and Argo Muria.

On 1 October 2026, this train is merged into one service together with Argo Muria and Argo Sindoro, named Muria.

== List of stations ==
On 1 February 2025 following the enactment of new train travel chart 2025, the Argo Merbabu use the stainless steel with 3x daily each unlike with the Argo Muria & Sindoro that alternating with each other. But, the Argo Merbabu also support for the Argo Muria & Argo Sindoro.

- Semarang Tawang Bank Jateng (Start/End)
- Pekalongan
- Pemalang
- Tegal
- Cirebon
- Bekasi
- Jatinegara
- Gambir (Start/End)

== See also ==
- Argo Muria
- Argo Sindoro
