= Jatinegara railway station =

Railway station in Indonesia

C15 Jatinegara Station Stasiun Jatinegara
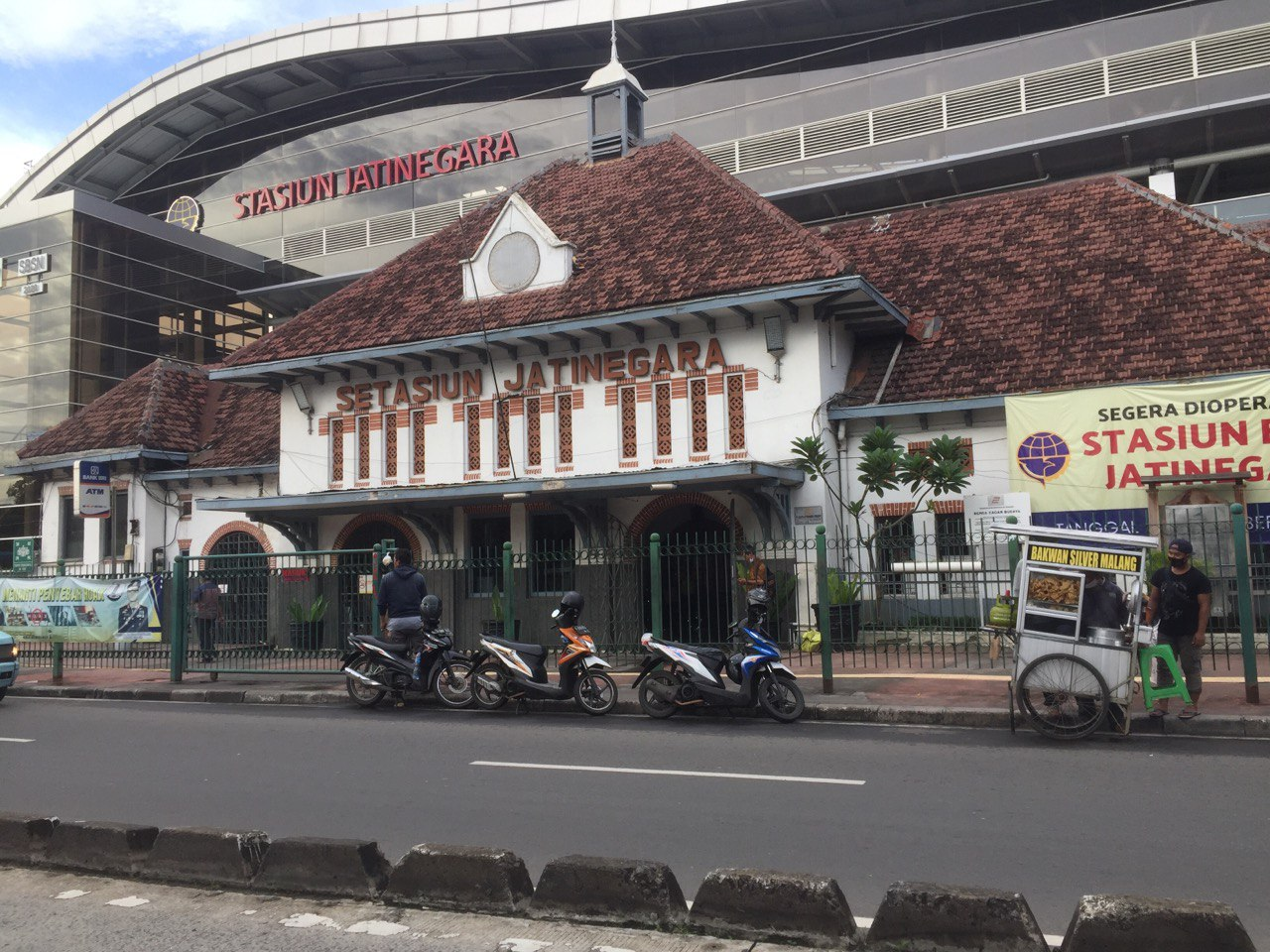
- Front view perspective from Jatinegara Station after adding new buildings, 2020. The original station building is retained.

General information
- Location: Jl. Raya Bekasi Barat, Pisangan Baru, Matraman, East Jakarta; Jakarta; Indonesia
- Coordinates: 6°12′54″S 106°52′13″E
- Elevation: +16 m (52 ft)
- System: Commuter rail and inter-city rail station
- Owner: Kereta Api Indonesia
- Operator: Kereta Api Indonesia; KAI Commuter
- Lines: Rajawali–Cikampek railway; Cikarang Loop Line
- Platforms: 3 island platforms 1 side platform
- Tracks: 7
- Connections: Bali Mester; Stasiun Jatinegara

Construction
- Structure type: Ground
- Parking: Available
- Accessible: Available
- Architect: S. Snuyf
- Architectural style: Combination between Indies Empire and New Indies (original building); Modern (new building)

Other information
- Station code: JNG • 0450 • JATI
- Classification: Large type A

History
- Opened: 15 October 1909; 116 years ago
- Rebuilt: 2018–2020
- Electrified: 6 April 1925; 101 years ago
- Former names: Meester Cornelis Station (SS)

Services
Preceding station		Following station
Pondok Jati towards Kampung Bandan or Jakarta Kota via Pasar Senen	Cikarang Commuter Line	Klender towards Bekasi or Cikarang
Matraman towards Angke or Kampung Bandan via Manggarai	Cikarang Commuter Line	Klender towards Bekasi or Cikarang
Location
- Location within Jakarta

Jatinegara Station (JNG) is a large type A-class railway station located on the border between Jatinegara and Matraman in Pisangan Baru Subdistrict, Matraman, East Jakarta. The station is the main entrance to Jakarta from cities east of Jakarta. Jatinegara station is operated by Kereta Api Indonesia and KAI Commuter.

As a connecting station to outside Jakarta, this station is passed by all trains to various cities on the island of Java (except of course to Banten and Bogor which are served by KRL). Currently, almost all intercity trains coming to Jakarta stop at this station to drop off passengers, except for trains with long chains (Gumarang, Jayakarta, Kertajaya, Tawang Jaya and Tegal Bahari trains) because their cars do not have enough platforms at these stations, plus Argo Bromo Anggrek, Argo Lawu, Argo Dwipangga and a few numbers of Argo Parahyangan trains. Meanwhile, for the opposite direction there are no long and medium distance trains that stop to pick up passengers at this station, unless the passenger road access to Gambir Station and/or Pasar Senen Station is disrupted. However, starting on 1 June 2023, followed by the implementation of the 2023 Train Travel Chart (GAPEKA), Jatinegara Station is serving intercity train passengers but only heading east including Argo Sindoro train 12, Argo Dwipangga train 10 and Argo Parahyangan train 36 and 38.

== History ==
=== Background ===
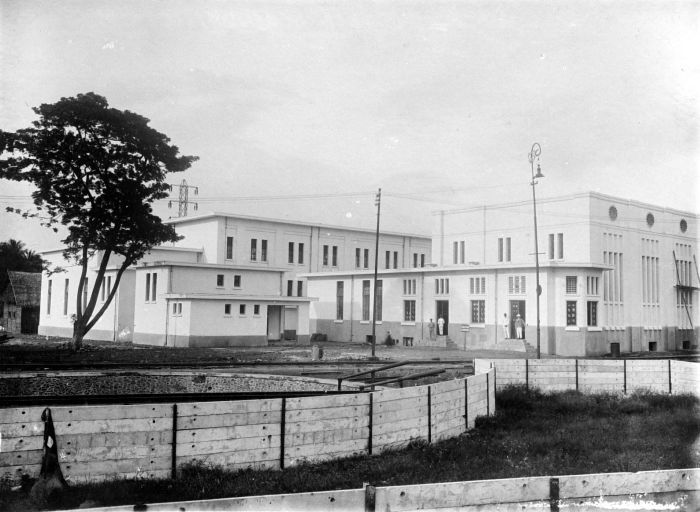
The Railway turntable and the Overhead power substation of the Jatinegara Station in 1924

Before the construction of the station, the area where the current building stood was known as swamp named "Rawa Bangke". Then the region was renamed to Meester Cornelis. The name was adopted from the calling of the students to a teacher who taught, founded a school, and preached in the area, namely Cornelis Senen. The name was later changed to Jatinegara during the Japanese occupation because the Japanese did not want a Dutch term. The name Jatinegara means "Negara Sejati" or "True Nation", the name of Prince Jayakarta who first founded the Jatinegara Kaum village. This village was founded after the Dutch destroyed the Sunda Kelapa Palace and is located between Rawamangun and Klender Market.

=== Early development (1909–2018) ===
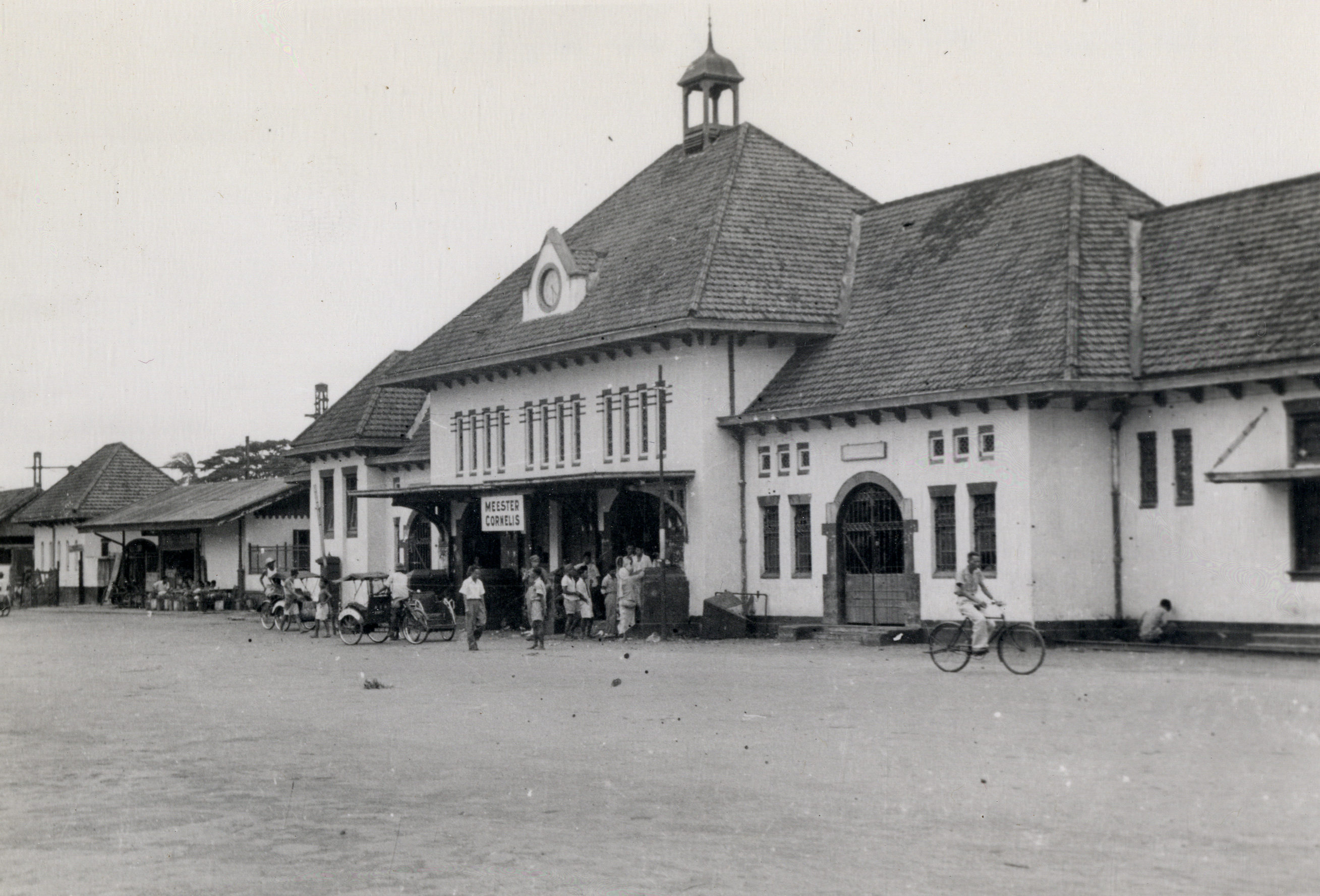
The frontage of the station c. 1925. At the time, the station was using the name "Messter Cornelis".

Jatinegara station was opened on 15 October 1909 during the Dutch colonial period. It was known then as Meester Cornelis station. The station was designed by S. Snuyff, the head of the department of public work of the Dutch East Indies at that time. Jatinegara station was the main station for the independent municipality of Meester Cornelis (now Jatinegara, a subdistrict of Jakarta). The station was meant to be the main connection to the east (Bandung). The town of Meester Cornelis, which is located on both sides of the Ciliwung River, has been an independent municipality since 1935. At first the station was called Rawa Bangke, a term for the swamps located nearby, which apparently also separate the Meester Cornelis NIS station and the other side of the river. Meester Cornelis BOS Station, which operated from the early days of the Batavia–Bekasi railway in 1887, is located further west and has served as the service office for some time.

The architect S. Snuyf originally intended to build a large station for trains to Bandung. The hope was that passengers from Weltevreden would choose this station over Kemayoran Station, then the main SS station, but not permanent. The takeover of the NIS line to Bogor, which was originally cancelled, but still allows for structural improvements and is still being maintained, so the plan is not being considered further. However, the requirement for a wider station is still being felt as Meester will be an important link station as the new link to Weltevreden Station and the existing line to Tanjung Priok via Pasar Senen. The expansion of the City of Batavia continues to lead directly to Meester Cornelis. This new station is planned to have the characteristics of a Dutch village, but also adapted to the tropics. It seems that the effort has paid off.

=== Major renovation (2018–present) ===
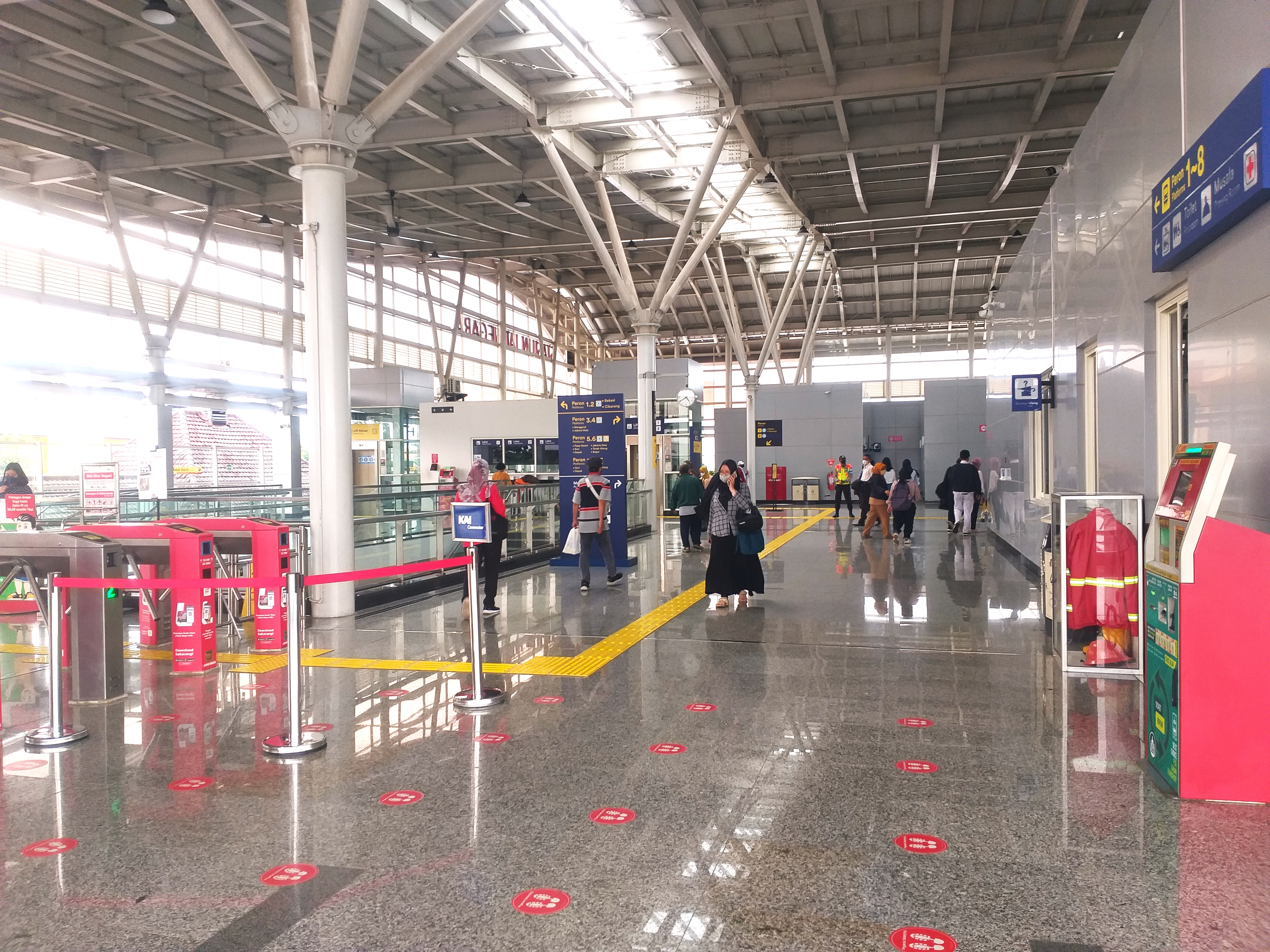
The entrance gate on the new building of the station.

In connection with the construction of the Manggarai–Cikarang doubled-double track, this station was majorly renovated. The new station building with a modern minimalist futuristic architectural style was built to replace the overcapping station left by the Staatsspoorwegen. The original station building by S. Snuyf has been maintained because it has been designated as a cultural heritage by PT KAI's Architectural Design and Preservation Center Unit. However, for reasons of passenger comfort, PT KAI and the Directorate General of Railways have provided a skybridge and escalator in the new station building.

The new station building was fully operational on 17 December 2020. For safety reasons, the Directorate General of Railways (Indonesian: Direktorat Jenderal Perkeretaapian or DJKA) remodeled the station a bit, such as removing the crossing area between platforms which was previously built while construction was still ongoing. The entrance to the old station building which has been serving passengers for 111 years has been moved to the north side of the new building.

== Building and layout ==
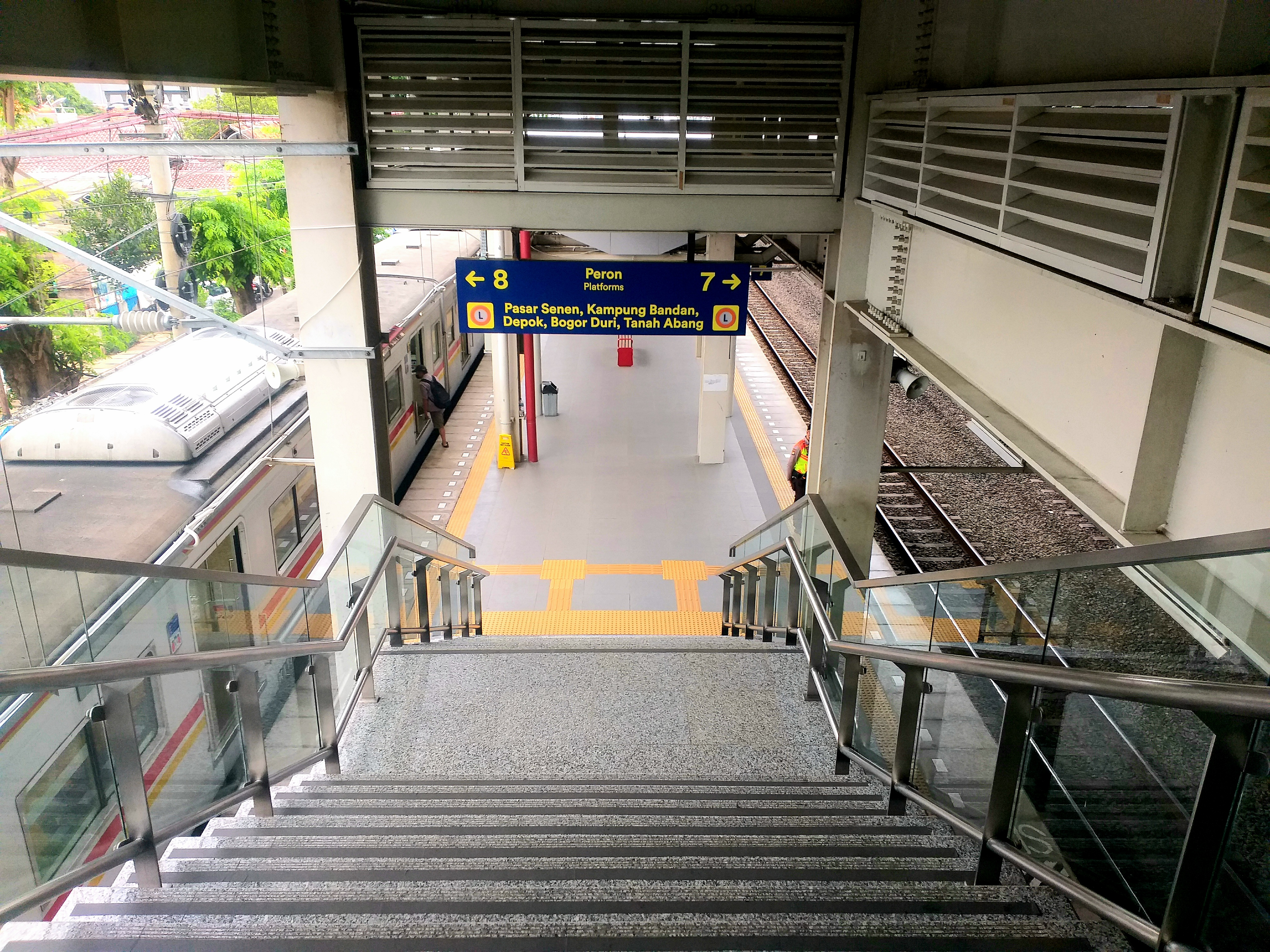
The stairs to platform 7 and 8

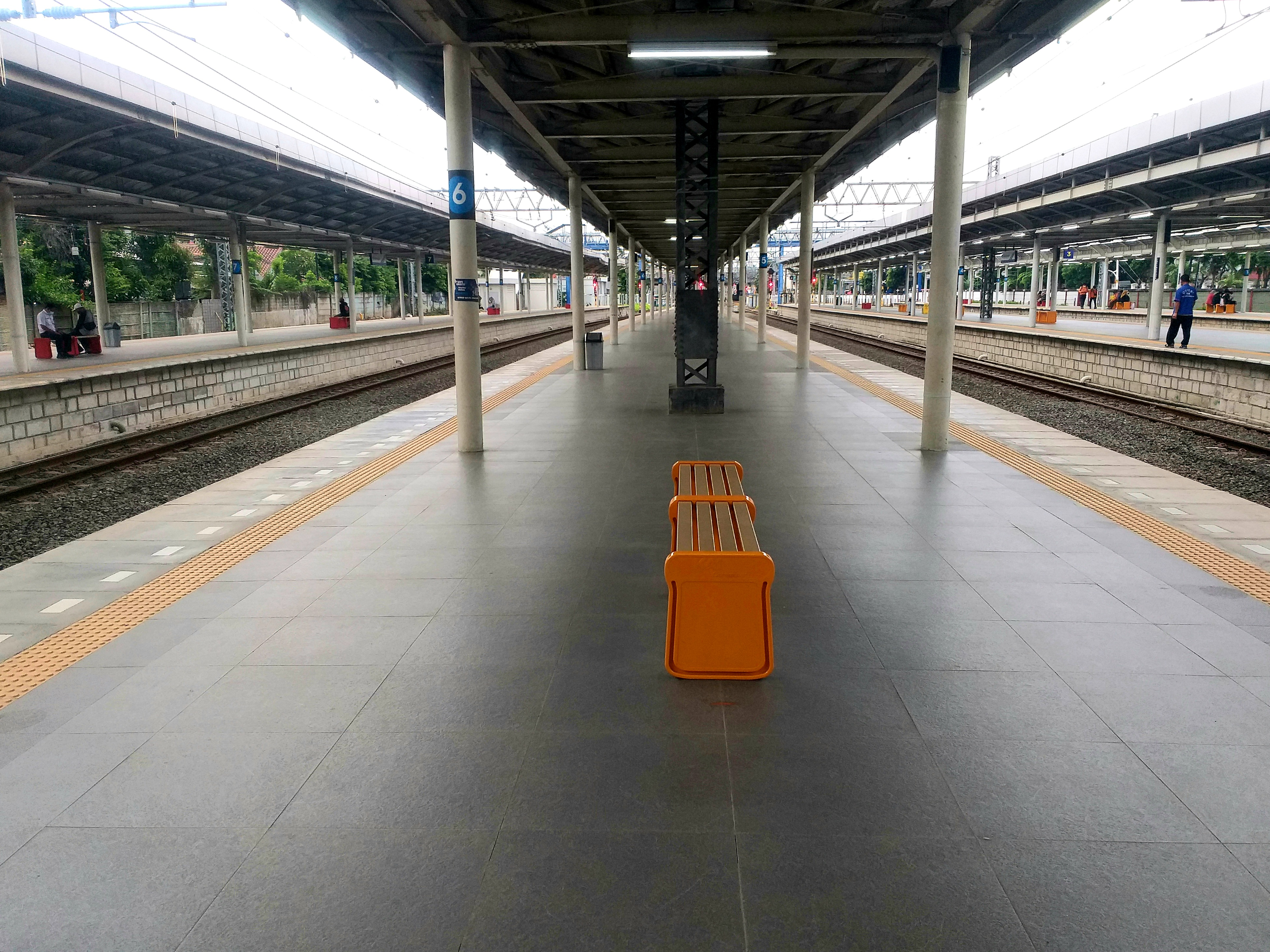
The platform of the station, taken in 2022

Initially, Jatinegara Station had seven railway lines with line 1 being a straight line towards Cikampek and line 2 being a straight line towards Manggarai plus one line connected to the locomotive depot located northwest of the station. To the north west of the station there are four railway lines that split up after the depot: one to Manggarai, the other to Pasar Senen.

The locomotive depot, which is located northwest of the station, was finally replaced by the Cipinang Locomotive Depot as of mid-2020. The locomotive depot building, which is a legacy of the Staatsspoorwegen, was demolished in October–November 2020, even though the building has the status as a cultural heritage.

The building designed by S. Snuyf was classified as a transitional style between the Indies Empire and the New Indies or modern colonial style (Nieuwe Indische Bouwstijl). The dominance of the modern colonial style can be seen from the shape of the roof which is steep but adapts to the tropical climate of the Dutch East Indies. The usage of doors, windows and clerestory functions as natural lighting and cross-ventilation in accordance with the humid tropical climate. The building is made asymmetrical, but has a focal point in the form of a building hall which is taller than the buildings on either side. However, that building has disappeared with the construction of the new station building.

After the construction of the double-double track on this station segment up to Cakung Station in 2018, there have been quite significant changes to the track layout. The number of lines at this station has increased to eight with the designation of each line depicted in the track layout diagram below. The following layout is not standard considering the existence of ad hoc changes in the field that arise from time to time, especially during overtaking, as well as changes that will come at the completion of the double-double track project. Jatinegara station is located at the junction of intracity loop tracks circling Central Jakarta.

C15
1st floor
Lobby, ticket counters, ticket gates and transfer access to BRT station
G
Line 8
Intercity train stop towards and from Pasar Senen
Tracks turning to Kampung Bandan
Island platform, the doors are opened on the left side or on right side
Line 7
Intercity train stop towards and from Pasar Senen
Straight lines to Kampung Bandan
Line 6
Cikarang Loop Line (from clockwise loop) (Klender) →
Straight lines from Kampung Bandan
Island platform, the doors are opened on the left side or on right side
Line 5
← (Pondok Jati) Cikarang Loop Line (to counterclockwise loop)

Shutter path from and towards Cipinang Locomotive Depot

Line 4
Intercity train stop to Gambir

Straight tracks to Manggarai (doubled-double track)

Island platform, doors are opened on left and right side for train arrivals from east
Line 3
Straight tracks to Cakung (doubled-double track)
Line 2
Intercity train stop from Gambir

← (Matraman) Cikarang Loop Line (to clockwise loop)

Straight tracks to Manggarai

Island platform, the doors are opened on the left side or on right side
Line 1
Cikarang Loop Line (from counterclockwise loop) (Klender) →
Straight tracks to Cikampek
Main building (cultural heritage)

== Services ==
The following is a list of train services at the Jatinegara Station, as of June 2023.

=== Passenger services ===
==== Intercity trains ====
===== Passenger boarding =====
From Gambir
Train service name	Class	Destination	Notes
Western Java routes
Argo Parahyangan	Executive Premium Economy	Bandung	Only on morning and evening schedules (for train 36 and 38)
Central Java routes
Argo Dwipangga	Executive and Luxury	Solo Balapan	Via Yogyakarta–Purwokerto Only on morning schedules
Northern Java routes
Argo Sindoro	Executive	Semarang Tawang	Via Pekalongan–Cirebon Only on evening schedules with train 12

===== Passenger alighting =====
To Gambir
Train service name	Class	Origin	Notes
Northern Java routes
Argo Muria	Executive	Semarang Tawang	Via Pekalongan–Cirebon
Argo Sindoro	Executive	Semarang Tawang	Via Pekalongan–Cirebon
Argo Merbabu	Executive	Semarang Tawang	Via Pekalongan–Cirebon Only morning schedules
Pandalungan	Executive	Jember	Via Surabaya Pasarturi–Semarang Tawang Only operates from Thursday–Monday
Brawijaya	Executive	Malang	Via Semarang Tawang–Solo Jebres
Sembrani	Executive and luxury	Surabaya Pasarturi	Via Semarang Tawang–Cirebon Morning schedule trains do not stop at Ngrombo Station on both directions
Cirebon (train)	Executive and economy	Cirebon	Train 25 only stops at Arjawinangun and Cikampek
Cirebon (train)	Executive and luxury	Cirebon	Train 29F-31F only operates on certain days
Cirebon (train)	Executive and business	Cirebon	Train 29F-31F only operates on certain days
Cirebon (train)	Executive and economy	Tegal	–
Argo Anjasmoro	Compartment Suite-Executive	Surabaya Pasarturi	Via Semarang Tawang-Cirebon. Running on particular days.
Cakrabuana train	Executive-Economy	Cirebon	Only morning schedules. Via Tegal-Cirebon: Only afternoon schedules.
Gunungjati train	Executive-Economy	Cirebon	Only morning schedules. Via Tegal-Cirebon: Only afternoon schedules.
Central Java routes
Argo Semeru	Executive	Surabaya Gubeng	Via Yogyakarta–Purwokerto
Bima	Executive	Surabaya Gubeng	Via Yogyakarta–Purwokerto
Gajayana	Executive and luxury	Malang	Via Yogyakarta–Purwokerto
Manahan	Executive	Solo Balapan	Via Yogyakarta–Purwokerto Only operates from Thursday–Sunday on morning schedules
Taksaka	Executive and luxury	Yogyakarta	Via Purwokerto–Cirebon
Purwojaya	Executive	Cilacap	Via Purwokerto–Cirebon
Batavia (train)	Executive-Premium Economy	Solo Balapan	Via Purwokerto-Cirebon
Cakrabuana train	Executive-Economy	Purwokerto	Only morning schedules
Western Java routes
Pangandaran	Executive and premium economy	Banjar	Via Bandung
Argo Parahyangan	Executive and premium economy	Bandung	Only train 47, 49, and 51F
Argo Parahyangan	Executive and luxury	Bandung	Only train 47, 49, and 51F

To Pasar Senen
Train service name	Class	Origin	Notes
Western Java routes
Serayu	Economy	Purwokerto	Via Kiaracondong–Kroya
Cikuray	Economy	Garut	Via Bandung
Central Java routes
Gaya Baru Malam Selatan	Executive and economy	Surabaya Gubeng	Via Yogyakarta–Purwokerto
Bangunkarta	Executive and economy	Jombang	Via Yogyakarta–Purwokerto
Singasari	Executive and economy	Blitar	Via Lempuyangan–Purwokerto
Mataram	Executive and premium economy	Solo Balapan	Via Yogyakarta–Purwokerto
Senja Utama Solo	Executive and premium economy	Solo Balapan	Via Yogyakarta–Purwokerto
Jaka Tingkir	Economy	Purwosari	Via Lempuyangan–Purwokerto
Bengawan	Economy	Purwosari	Via Lempuyangan–Purwokerto
Fajar and Senja Utama Yogya	Executive and premium economy	Yogyakarta	Via Purwokerto–Cirebon
Bogowonto	Executive and premium economy	Lempuyangan	Via Purwokerto–Cirebon Prujakan
Gajahwong	Executive and economy	Lempuyangan	Via Purwokerto–Cirebon Prujakan
Progo	Economy	Lempuyangan	Via Purwokerto–Cirebon Prujakan
Sawunggalih	Executive and premium economy	Kutoarjo	Via Purwokerto–Cirebon
Northern Java routes
Tawang Jaya Premium	Executive and economy	Semarang Tawang	Via Pekalongan–Cirebon
Menoreh	Economy	Semarang Tawang	Via Pekalongan–Cirebon Prujakan Only operates on certain schedules
Dharmawangsa	Executive and economy	Surabaya Pasarturi	Via Semarang Poncol–Cirebon Prujakan
Airlangga	Economy	Surabaya Pasarturi	Via Semarang Poncol–Cirebon Prujakan
Brantas	Economy	Blitar	Via Semarang Tawang–Solo Jebres
Jayabaya	Executive and economy	Malang	Via Surabaya Pasarturi–Semarang Poncol
Matarmaja	Economy	Malang	Via Semarang Tawang–Solo Jebres
Majapahit	Economy	Malang	Via Semarang Tawang–Solo Jebres

==== KRL Commuterline ====
- KAI Commuter
  - Cikarang Loop Line (Full Racket)
    - to Cikarang (direct service)
    - to Cikarang (looping through Manggarai-Kampung Bandan-Pasar Senen and vice versa)
  - Cikarang Loop Line (Half Racket), to Angke/Kampung Bandan (via Tanah Abang and Duri) and Cikarang

== Supporting transportation ==
The Jatinegara station is connected to Transjakarta bus services at the Flyover Jatinegara BRT station on corridor 10, Stasiun Jatinegara BRT station on corridor 11, and Bali Mester BRT station on corridor 5. The Stasiun Jatinegara 2 BRT station was temporarily closed for revitalization on 15 April 2022 in order to create a seamless integration between TransJakarta and KRL Commuterline at Jatinegara station. The revitalization and integration of Stasiun Jatinegara BRT station was inaugurated on 4 January 2023.

Transportation type	Station	Route	Destination
TransJakarta	Bali Mester	List of Transjakarta corridors#Corridor 5	Ancol–Kampung Melayu
TransJakarta	Bali Mester	List of Transjakarta corridors#Cross-corridor routes	PGC–Juanda
TransJakarta	Flyover Jatinegara	List of TransJakarta corridors#Corridor 10	Tanjung Priok–PGC
TransJakarta	Flyover Jatinegara	PRJ1	Cililitan-JIExpo Kemayoran (only operates during the Jakarta Fair)
TransJakarta	Stasiun Jatinegara	List of TransJakarta corridors#Corridor 11	Pulo Gebang–Kampung Melayu
TransJakarta	Bali Mester	5B (non-BRT)	Tebet Station–BNN
TransJakarta	N/A	5M (MetroTrans)	Kampung Melayu bus terminal–Tanah Abang station (via Cikini Raya–Medan Merdeka Selatan)
TransJakarta	Stasiun Jatinegara	11M (Non BRT)	Rusun Rawa Bebek-Bukit Duri
TransJakarta	N/A	JAK 41 (MikroTrans Jak Lingko)	Kampung Melayu bus terminal–Pulo Gadung bus terminal
TransJakarta	N/A	JAK 42 (MikroTrans Jak Lingko)	Kampung Melayu bus terminal-Pondok Kelapa
Mikrolet	N/A	M02	Kampung Melayu bus terminal-Pulo Gadung bus terminal (via Paus and Balap Sepeda)
Mikrolet	N/A	M06A	Jatinegara station-Pekayon
Mikrolet	N/A	M27	Kampung Melayu bus terminal–Pulo Gadung bus terminal (via Bekasi Timur Raya)
Mikrolet	N/A	M31	Kampung Melayu bus terminal-Pondok Kelapa
Mikrolet	N/A	M32	Kampung Melayu bus terminal-Klender bus terminal
Regular Transjabodetabek	N/A	AC100B (MetroMini)	Kampung Melayu bus terminal–Cibinong bus terminal
Regular Transjabodetabek	N/A	P9A (Mayasari Bakti)	Senen bus terminal–Terminal Bekasi bus terminal (via Bekasi Timur)

== Gallery ==
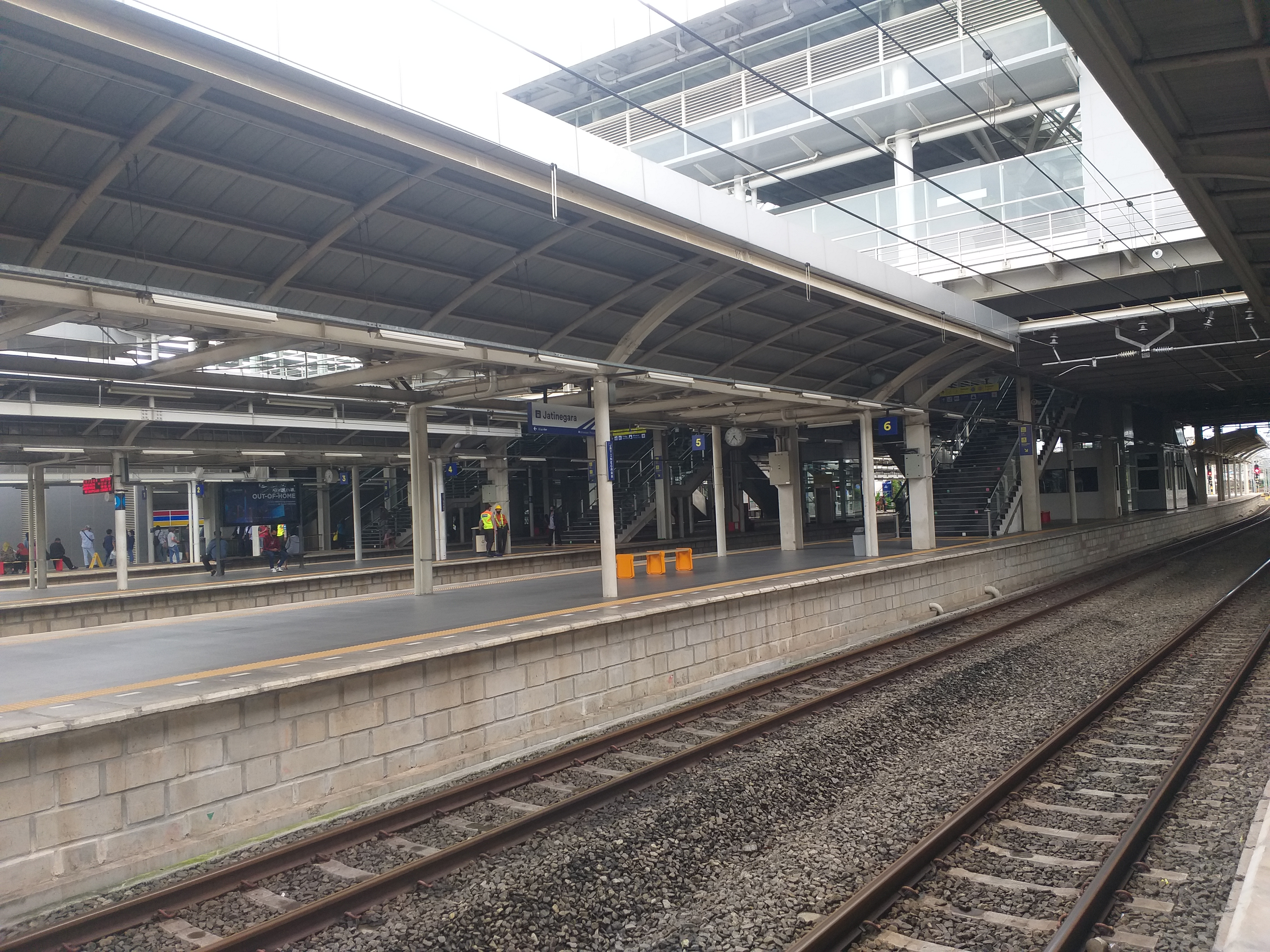
The platform of the station (15 March 2022)

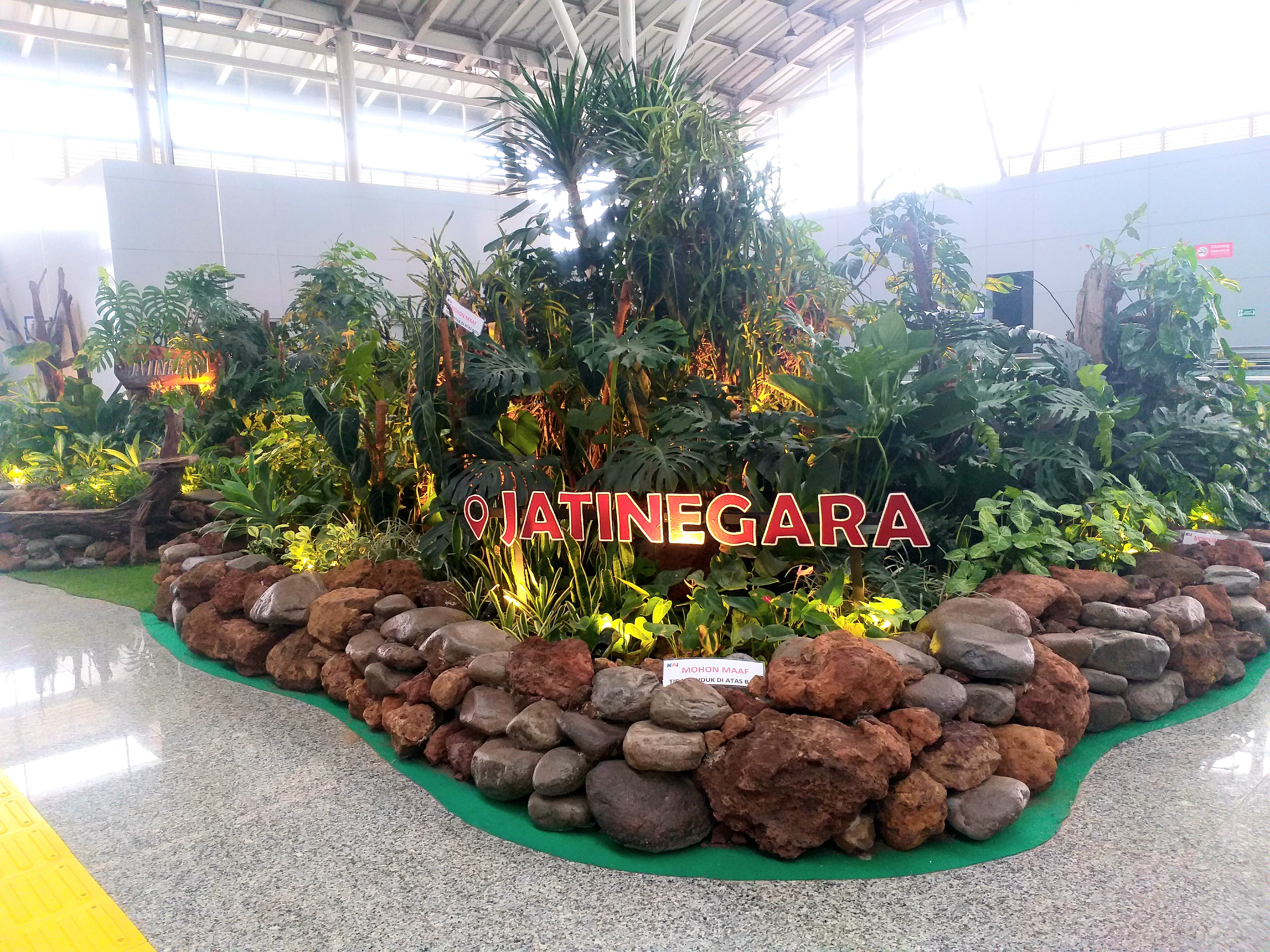
A small park at the second floor of the station. The formation of the park alternating based on a certain moment, including religious events, such as Eid al-Fitr and Christmas.

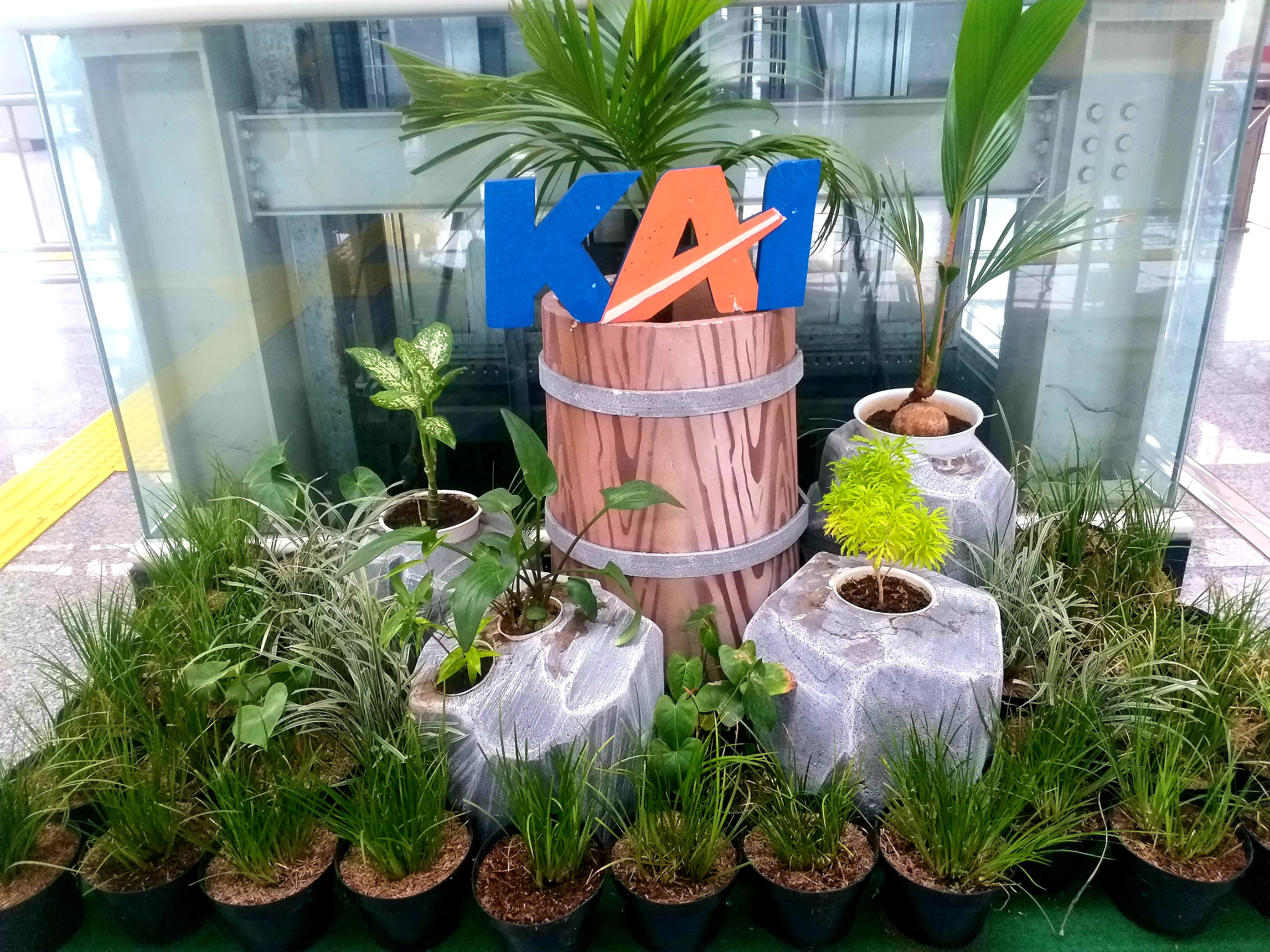
The logo of Kereta Api Indonesia at the station concourse

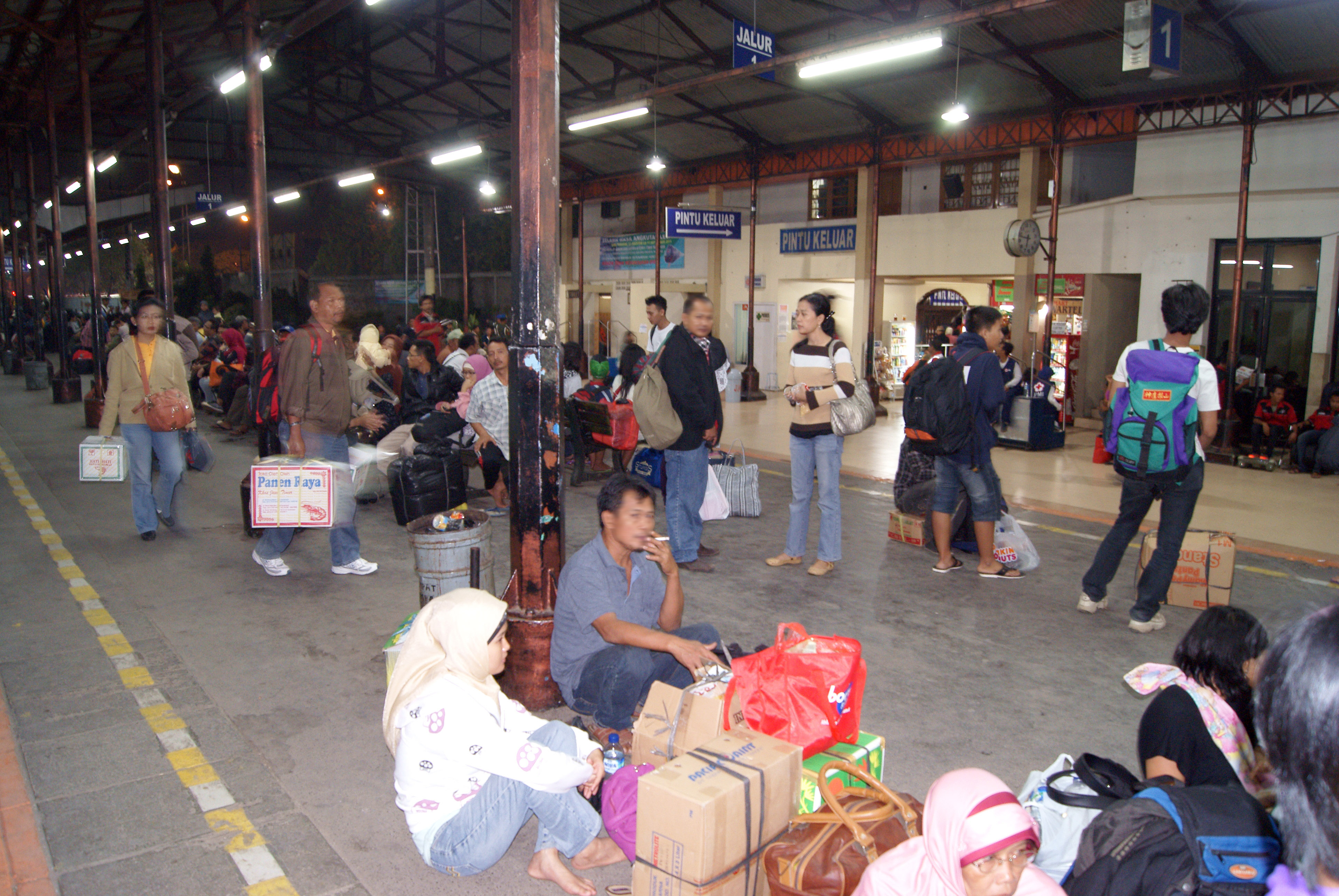
The platform of station filled with travelers (pemudik) (2011)

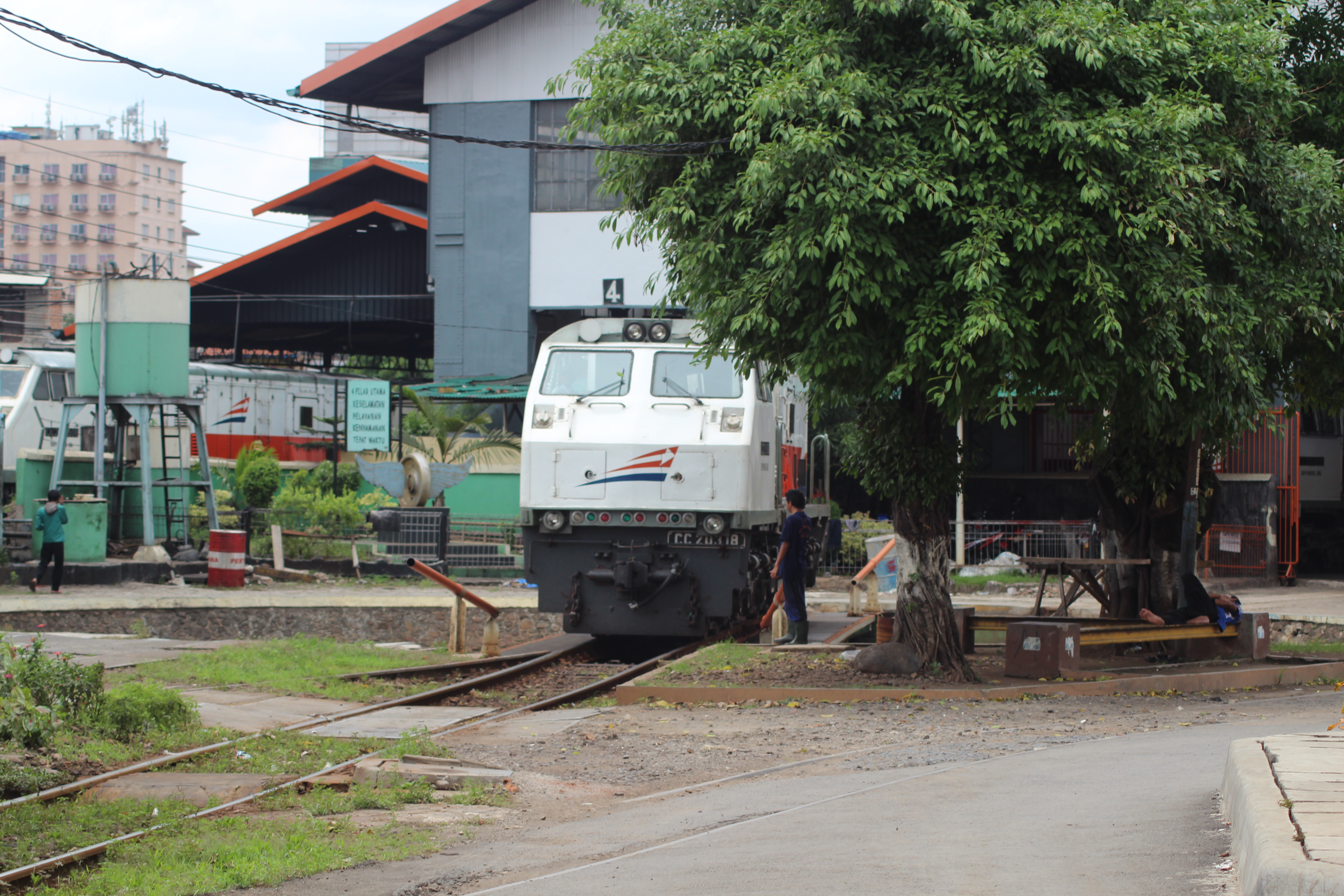
A CC203 locomotive undergoing a head turn at the Jatinegara Depot

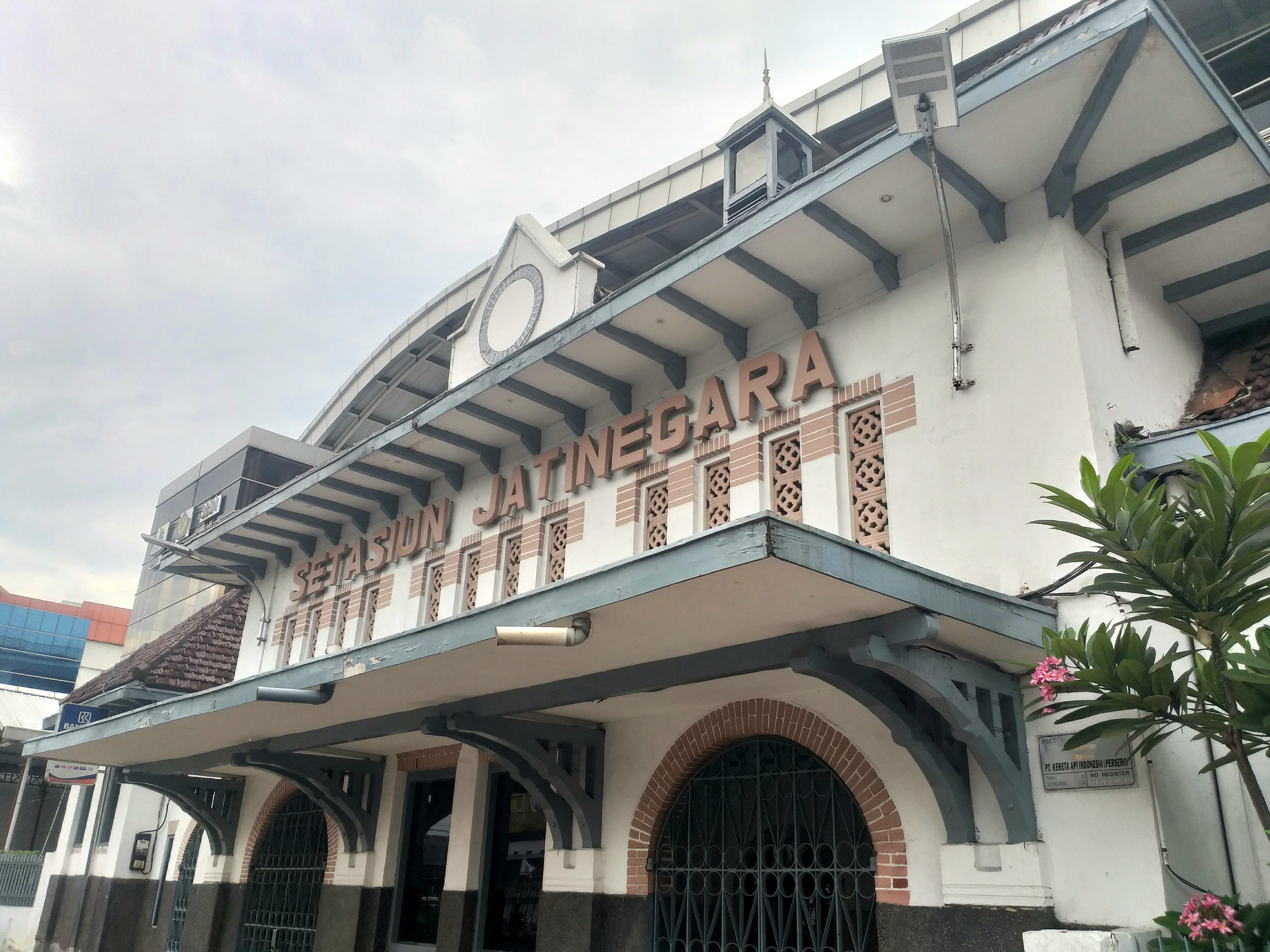
The exterior of Jatinegara Station (15 March 2022)

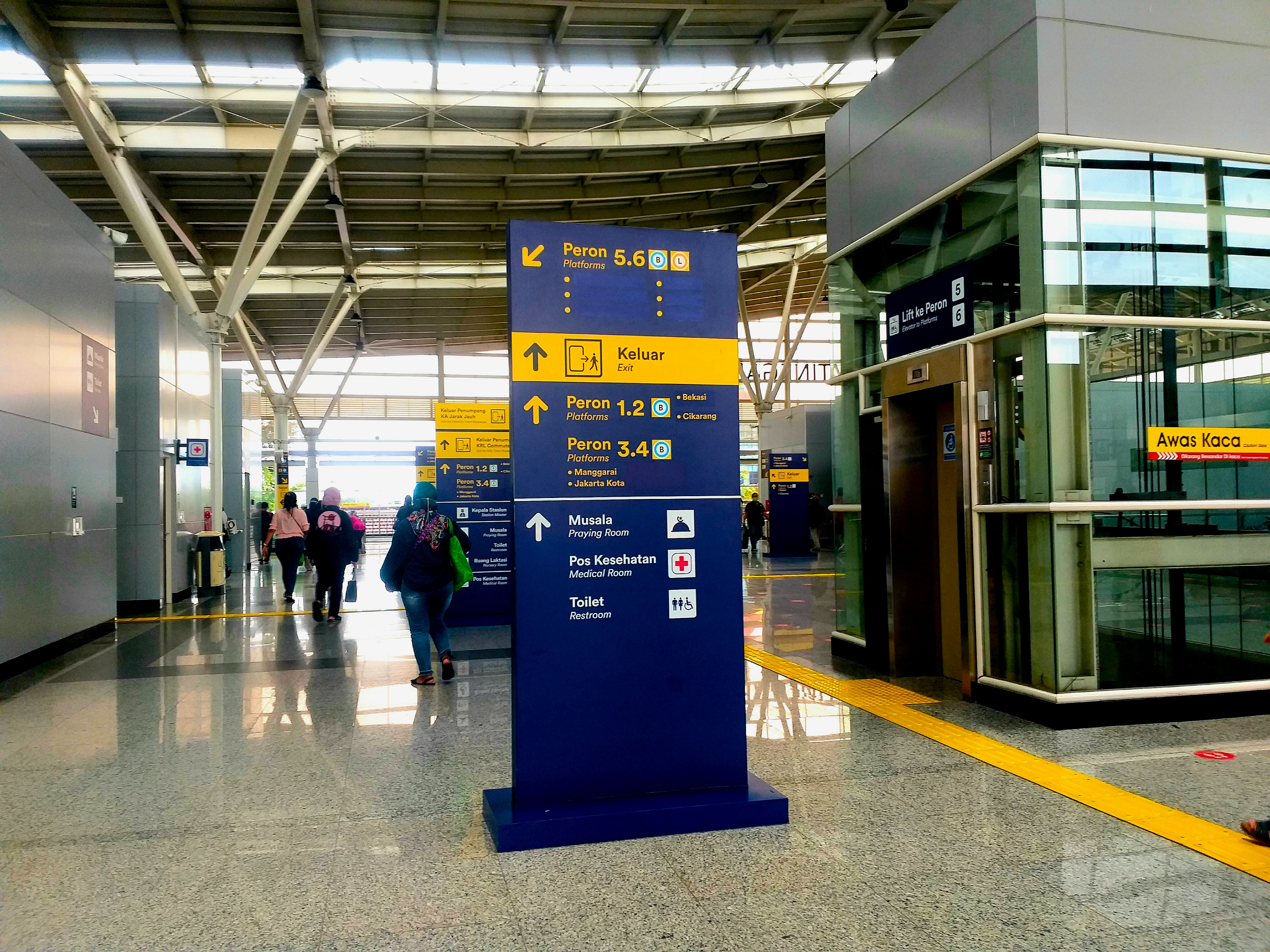
The interior of the new building of Jatinegara station (15 March 2022)

== Cited works ==
- de Jong, Michiel van Ballegoijen (1993). Spoorwegstations op Java. Amsterdam: de Bataafse Leeuw. ISBN 9789067073189.
- Pratiwi, R.; Soviana, N.; Sudarsih, A. (2014). "Jatinegara (JNG): Stasiun Singgah Bergaya Peralihan". Majalah KA (in Indonesian). Vol. 97. pp. 14–15. ISSN 2087-9458.
