= Argo Muria =

Passenger train service between Jakarta and Semarang, Indonesia

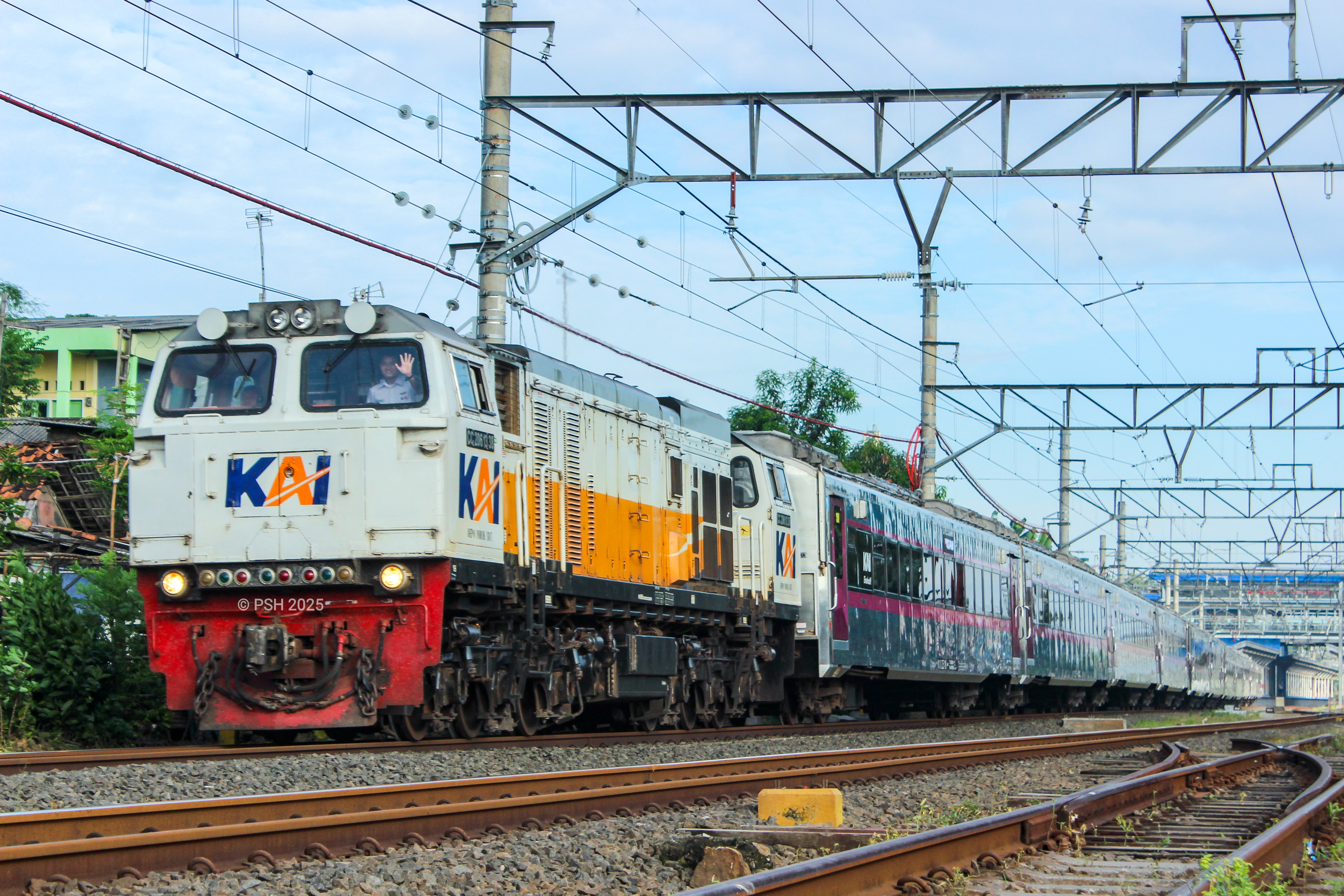
- Argo Muria passed at Tambun & greeted by Train driver, 2025

Overview
- Service type: Inter-city rail
- Status: Operational
- First service: 22 December 1997
- Current operator: Kereta Api Indonesia

Route
- Termini: Semarang Tawang Bank Jateng; Gambir
- Distance travelled: 440 km (273 mil)
- Average journey time: 5 hours 13 minutes
- Service frequency: 3x daily each way
- Train number: 20-22

On-board services
- Class: executive
- Seating arrangements: 50 seats arranged 2-2 (executive class)
- Catering facilities: On-board cafe and trolley service

Technical
- Rolling stock: CC206
- Track gauge: 1067 mm
- Operating speed: 88 - 120 km/h (54-75 mph)
Route map

Argo Muria is a passenger train service operated by Kereta Api Indonesia on route between Semarang Tawang Bank Jateng and Jakarta Gambir. It is an executive train that runs three trips daily each direction, covering 440 km (273 mi) in 5 hours 13 minutes.

This train also supports the Argo Sindoro, which is on the same route but a different schedule.

== Etymology ==
The word Argo (Javanese for mountain) is a brand name of superior executive train services by PT Kereta Api Indonesia. Muria is derived from Mount Muria located in Jepara Regency, Central Java.

== History ==
=== Argo Muria (1997–2008) ===
The Argo Muria was operated by Kereta Api Indonesia for the first time on 22 December 1997 that offer morning schedule from Jakarta to Semarang, while evening schedule from Semarang to Jakarta that series of trains with K9 bogies so that it became one of the superior trains of its time. However, the Argo Muria I train stopped operating on 20–26 May 1998 due to low occupancy levels. Apart from the Argo Muria I train, several passenger train operations were also stopped due to the riots that occurred in Jakarta.

In 1998, this train operated using a restored train set from 1965.

In 2002, the Argo Muria I & II operates using a train set made by PT INKA, manufactured in 2002, so that the previous train set is used to add trips Argo Gede. The newly operated train has a travel time that is the opposite of the Argo Muria I so that there are two train departure schedules for the Semarang–Jakarta route.

Since in 2007, the Argo Muria I The name was changed to Argo Sindoro and began operating using a train set with K9 bogies which had previously been used for operating the Argo Lawu. Then, this train returned to operation using executive train sets manufactured in 2002 since the train sets with K9 bogies belonging to Argo Bromo Anggrek and Argo Sindoro were withdrawn by PT INKA for further repairs.

=== Argo Muria (2009 – Present) ===
In 2017, the Argo Muria had operated using a series of executive trains made by PT INKA released in 2017.

In April 2019, the Argo Muria with the Argo Sindoro return with operation using a train set with K9 bogies in operation—previously used for the operation of the Argo Bromo Anggrek.

After operating using the used K9 bogie trains belonging to the Argo Bromo Anggrek, the executive trains manufactured in 2017 were transferred to the Jakarta Kota Train Depot (JAKK) for the operation of the Additional Argo Lawu.

After return operate as the impact of the COVID-19 pandemic in Indonesia was ended, the Argo Muria & Argo Sindoro return use the executive trains made by PT INKA, produced in 2016, previously owned by Bima and Argo Dwipangga, belonging to the JAKK depot and SLO depot.

The Argo Muria and Argo Muria Supplementary depart from Semarang Tawang Station at 16:15 (Train 13 PM I) and 18:00 PM (Train 7003 PM II), and depart from Gambir Station at 00:35 (Train 7004 PM) and 07:05 (Train 14 AM the following day). The differences between the Regular Argo Muria and the Additional Argo Muria trains are in terms of price, train composition, train speed, travel time, and limited train schedule (for the Additional Argo Muria train).

Especially for the Argo Muria train, every weekend, the train composition is increased from 9 executive cars to 10 executive cars, while the Argo Sindoro train doesn't add executive cars.

On 28 September 2022, following the 77th birthday of KAI, the Argo Muria and Argo Sindoro increased the speed of the train from 105 km/h (65 mph) to 120 km/h (75 mph).

On 1 June 2023, following the enactment of a new train travel chart 2023, the frequency of the Argo Muria & Sindoro has now increased to three departures per day, including one departure from Semarang in the evening, and two departures from Jakarta in the morning and evening.

After the six flagship trains such as the Argo Bromo Anggrek, Argo Semeru–Bima, Argo Lawu–Argo Dwipangga, and Taksaka received the latest generation of stainless steel trains made by PT INKA, on 15 June 2025, the Argo Muria & Argo Sindoro officially uses the new generation executive train series made by PT INKA.

Starting 15 August 2025, the Argo Muria (No. KA 20–21) stops at Batang Station, making it easier for passengers traveling to the Batang Industrial Area from Semarang or from Jakarta.

== List of stations ==
On 1 February 2025 following the enactment of new train travel chart 2025, the Argo Muria 20 replaced the Argo Sindoro 19 in the schedule.

- Semarang Tawang Bank Jateng (Start/End)
- Batang (only morning schedule to Semarang & evening schedule to Jakarta)
- Pekalongan
- Tegal
- Cirebon
- Bekasi
- Jatinegara (only bound depart to Semarang for morning & night schedule, while arrival from Semarang for evening schedule)
- Gambir (Start/End)

== In popular culture ==
The Argo Muria, along with other Argo class trains, was featured in a campursari song by Cak Diqin, "Sepur Argo Lawu," which includes the names of trains such as Argo Lawu, Argo Dwipangga, Argo Wilis, Argo Muria, Argo Bromo Anggrek, and Sri Tanjung.

== See also ==
- Semarang
- Argo Sindoro
