= Argo Lawu =

Executive class train service in Indonesia

- Argo Lawu train with Stainless Steel New Generation trainset, passing through Lempuyangan Station, 2026.

Overview
- Service type: Inter-city rail
- Status: Operational
- Predecessor: Solo Jaya (train)
- First service: 21 September 1996
- Current operator: Kereta Api Indonesia

Route
- Termini: Gambir; Solo Balapan
- Distance travelled: 571 km (354 mil)
- Average journey time: 6 hours 55 minutes
- Service frequency: 1x Daily everyday (Solo to Jakarta Gambir at morning, Jakarta Gambir to Solo at night)
- Train number: 13-14

On-board services
- Classes: executive & luxury
- Seating arrangements: 50 seats arranged 2-2 (executive class); 26 seats arranged 1-2 (luxury class)
- Sleeping arrangements: the seats can be rotated and can be reclined up to 140° (luxury class)
- Catering facilities: On-board cafe and trolley service
- Entertainment facilities: free Wi-Fi, Air conditioning Passenger information system, USB, etc

Technical
- Rolling stock: CC206
- Track gauge: 1067 mm
- Operating speed: 80 km/h (50 mph) to 120 km/h (75 mph)
Route map

Argo Lawu is an executive and luxury class train that operated by Kereta Api Indonesia in Java. The train connecting between Gambir and Solo Balapan via Purwokerto and Yogyakarta. The train offer 1x daily each way (morning schedule from Surakarta (Solo Balapan) to Jakarta (Gambir), while night schedule from Jakarta Gambir to Surakarta (Solo Balapan) around 571 kilometers (354 mil) in 6 hours 55 minutes.

This train was rolling with the Argo Dwipangga at the same route but difference their schedule like to Gambir at night schedule while morning schedule to Solo Balapan since 2010. This train as the oldest Argo that still operating after the Argo Gede was ceased on 27 April 2010.

== Etymology ==
The word Argo (Javanese for mountain) is a brand name of superior executive train services by PT Kereta Api Indonesia. The word of Lawu is derived from Mount Lawu located in Karanganyar Regency, Central Java.

== History ==
=== Introduction of the Argo Lawu (1996 - 2002) ===
The Argo Lawu was launched on 21 September 1996 with the additional brand "JSO-751" which means "Jakarta–Solo for 7 hours travel on the 51st anniversary of the independence of RI" - a fitting conclusion to the 51st Indonesian Independence Day celebrations and the 51st anniversary of Kereta Api Indonesia. At the onset, this intercity train operated using a train set manufactured that same year by INKA Ltd JSC which had the characteristics of using air conditioning with a trapezoidal external unit, lower glass position, and a higher train size. At the same time, this train was also pulled by CC203, the same as other Argoclassed trains. This train set was the result of intensive health care—including replacing the bogie with a K8 (NT-60) bogie—from the economy class coaches of the 1950s. The Argo Lawu train is the third Argo class train to be launched, after the Argo Bromo JS950 train and the Argo Gede JB250.

=== 1st Evolution of the Argo Lawu (2002 - 2007) ===
The Argo Lawu train was operated using K9 bogie train sets so that the previous train sets (1996 edition) were used for the operation of the Taksaka and Argo Dwipangga train. These train sets had a different design from the train sets on the Argo Bromo Anggrek and Argo Muria, namely purple. The geographical conditions on the central Java line that did not match the capabilities of the K9 bogies caused the Argo Lawu train to frequently Derailment (train). An example of a derailment involving the K9 train set when it was still used by the Argo Lawu train was the derailment on April 17, 2005, on the section of road between Cirebon and Cangkring, also on 21 April 2007 in Candinegara, Pekuncen, Banyumas.

=== 2nd Evolution of the Argo Lawu (2008 - Present) ===
In October 2008, the Argo Lawu operating with the car 2008 product by PT INKA.

Since on 21 July 2016, the Argo Lawu for the regular trip with the Argo Dwipangga & Bima possible operated using executive car that product from 2016 by PT INKA before the replacement of the train set on 16 August 2019 after the original set was transferred to the Cirebon (CN) Train Depot for the operation of the Argo Cheribon.

On 26 May 2019, the Argo Lawu & Argo Dwipangga officially serving with the luxury class with 26 seats Following the flagship train of Yogyakarta Operational Region VI,rgo Dwipangga, which began operating on 13 December 2023, the Argo Lawu train has started using second-generation stainless steel trains on 18 December 2023. As a result, the Argo Lawu & Argo Dwipangga as the second with the New Generation from Solo Balapan to Jakarta that pruduced by PT INKA.

== List of stations ==
On 1 February 2025 following the enactment of new train travel chart 2025, the Argo Lawu totally use with the New Generation Stainless Steel & Luxury New Generation, most popular passenger train arrived at the trip is from Gambir to Yogyakarta, not to Solo Balapan.

- Gambir (Start/End)
- Cirebon
- Purwokerto
- Yogyakarta
- Klaten
- Solo Balapan (Start/End)

== Incidents ==
- On 21 April 2007 at 12.30 local time, the Argo Lawu crashed after departing from Purwokerto. There were no casualties of the passenger and crew in this accident.

== In popular culture ==
The Argo Lawu train, along with other trains, was featured in a campur sari song by Cak Diqin, "Sepur Argo Lawu," which mentions train names such as Argo Lawu, Argo Dwipangga, Argo Wilis, Argo Muria, Argo Bromo Anggrek, and Sri Tanjung.

The Argo Lawu train is also featured in a Javanese children's song, "Sinten Numpak Sepur." Argo Lawu's name is mentioned in one of the lyrics.

== See also ==
- Argo Dwipangga
- Argo Wilis
- Taksaka
- Lodaya
- Argo Bromo Anggrek
