= Argo Dwipangga =

Executive class and luxury train in Indonesia

- Argo Dwipangga passing through Maguwo railway station from Jakarta way, 2026

Overview
- Service type: Inter-city rail
- Status: Operational
- First service: 21 April 1998
- Current operator: Kereta Api Indonesia

Route
- Termini: Gambir; Solo Balapan
- Distance travelled: 571 km (354 mil)
- Average journey time: 6 hours 55 minutes
- Service frequency: 1x Daily everyday (Solo to Jakarta Gambir at night, Jakarta Gambir to Solo at morning)
- Train number: 15-16

On-board services
- Classes: executive & luxury
- Seating arrangements: 50 seats arranged 2-2 (executive class); 26 seats arranged 1-2 (luxury class)
- Sleeping arrangements: the seats can be rotated and can be reclined up to 140° (luxury class)
- Catering facilities: On-board cafe and trolley service
- Entertainment facilities: free Wi-Fi, Air conditioning Passenger information system, USB, etc

Technical
- Rolling stock: CC206
- Track gauge: 1067 mm
- Operating speed: 80 km/h (50 mph) to 120 km/h (75 mph)
Route map

Argo Dwipangga is an executive and luxury class train that operated by Kereta Api Indonesia in Java. The train connecting between Gambir and Solo Balapan via Purwokerto and Yogyakarta. The train offer 1x daily each way (night schedule from Surakarta (Solo Balapan) to Jakarta (Gambir), while morning schedule from Jakarta Gambir to Surakarta (Solo Balapan) around 571 kilometers (354 mil) in 6 hours 55 minutes.

This train was rolling with the Argo Lawu at the same route but difference their schedule like to Gambir at morning schedule while night schedule to Solo Balapan since 2010.

== Etymology ==
The word Argo (Javanese for mountain) is a brand name of superior executive train services by PT Kereta Api Indonesia. the Argo commonly from the different Mountain. However, The name Dwipangga is taken from one of the words in Sanskrit which means elephant. The elephant in question is an elephant in the legend of the Gajahwong River in the Special Region of Yogyakarta, which river is located east of Yogyakarta Station. In the story, it is told that there was an elephant named Kyai Dwipangga who was the favorite elephant of Ki Sapa Wira, a abdi dalem of the Mataram Sultanate during the reign of Sultan Agung.

== History ==
=== Dwipangga ===
The Dwipangga train was first inaugurated by the then Minister of Transportation, Giri Suseno Hadihardjono, on 21 April 1998, with the CC203 (CC203 98 13 SDT) as the official locomotive. The train sets used were originally special class coaches with a 2-1 seating arrangement of 33 seats in one coach each, the result of extensive improvements and refurbishments made to coaches manufactured in the 1950s or earlier. Ticket price for the special class at that time was Rp160.000,00.

=== Argo Dwipangga (October 1998 - 2011) ===
In response to the low occupancy rate of the special class trains, the service was changed to executive class and the name of the train was changed to "Argo Dwipangga" on 5 October 1998. The color scheme of the Argo Dwipangga at that time was white-ivory, some of which were the typical gray of the "Argo" trains.

In November 1998, the Argo Dwipangga began operating using a series of trains made by PT INKA, but the dining trains and generating trains used were existing trains at the Solo Balapan Depot. In 2002, this train also operated using the former Argo Lawu train set from 1996 after it operated using the K9 bogie train.

The Argo Dwipangga at that time had a distinctive feature, namely the "Dwipangga" logo with a picture of an elephant, both when it was still a special class train and the executive class "Argo" - unlike the logo on the "Argo" train at that time - before the logo change was carried out like other executive class "Argo" trains.

=== Argo Dwipangga (2011 - Present) ===
After the Manggarai Railway Center renovated the 1984 and 1986 executive trains to give them a "new image" with "airplane-like" windows, the Argo Dwipangga trains began operating using the renovated executive trains in 2011. The 1996 and 1998 trains were transferred to the Yogyakarta Train Depot (YK) to operate the Taksaka.

Since 21 July 2016, the Argo Dwipangga, along with the Argo Lawu and Bima, have been operating using the latest 2016 executive trains manufactured by PT INKA—before the trains were replaced on 1 December 2019.

On 26 May 2019, the Argo Dwipangga & Argo Lawu officially serving with the luxury class with 26 seats

On 1 June 2023 following the enactment of new train travel chart 2023, the Argo Dwipangga to Surakarta also stops at Jatinegara to provide an alternative for passengers in the Jakarta metropolitan area area who use this service.

In December 2023, the Argo Dwipangga received a second-generation stainless steel train made by PT INKA. The latest train was launched on 13 December 2023. The difference from the previous generation is that the train entrance and connecting doors now use automatic electric doors. This will make it easier for customers to open and close the doors without expending a lot of energy. The sound of doors opening and closing is also quieter.

In addition, the passenger information system (PIDS) available on each train can display information about the nearest station, speed, and room temperature. The PIDS helps create a better travel experience and provides important information for customers during the trip. The windows of the new generation executive and luxury trains have also been updated to tempered double glass from the previous tempered glass so that the level of safety is higher, helps reduce the entry of excess heat and UV rays into the room, and reduces noise better. KAI added a USB charger port on each seat, in addition to the power outlets already available on the train walls. The additional charging facilities allow passengers to continue using their smartphones, laptops, and smartwatches no worrying about running out of power, in accordance with modern needs.

Another advantage of the latest luxury class is the addition of toilets from the previous Luxury train, from one to two, and separate male and female restrooms. The dining car in this latest generation has also been updated to be more luxurious, with premium interiors and furnishings. The dining car is dominated by wood touches and softer and more comfortable dining chairs. The same information system is also available in the dining car.

== List of stations ==
On 1 February 2025 following the enactment of new train travel chart 2025, the Argo Dwipangga totally use with the New Generation Stainless Steel & Luxury New Generation, most popular passenger train arrived at the trip is from Gambir to Yogyakarta, not to Solo Balapan.

- Gambir (Start/End)
- Cirebon
- Purwokerto
- Yogyakarta
- Klaten
- Solo Balapan (Start/End)

== Accident and incident ==
- On 9 December 2002, the Argo Dwipangga A truck overturned into a rice field in Sarwogadung, Mirit, Kebumen, after the truck hit a railway bridge, causing the tracks to shift. Four people were killed, 24 others seriously injured, and hundreds of passengers sustained minor injuries as a result of the derailment.
- On 3 April 2007, the Argo Dwipangga experienced a collapse at km 342+500, Babakan, Karanglewas, Banyumas which resulted in the train journey being hampered.
- On 1 October 2013, the Argo Dwipangga crashed into a pickup truck carrying a group of Hajj pilgrims in Kertasemaya, Indramayu. Thirteen people died in the incident.
- On 25 August 2019, the Argo Dwipangga crashed into a truck at km 463+4/5 between Kutowinangun Station and Prembun Station which resulted in the death of the truck driver and one other person being injured.

== See also ==
- Argo Lawu
- Taksaka
- Argo Wilis
- Anggrek
- Lodaya
