= Taksaka =

Passenger train service between Jakarta and Yogyakarta

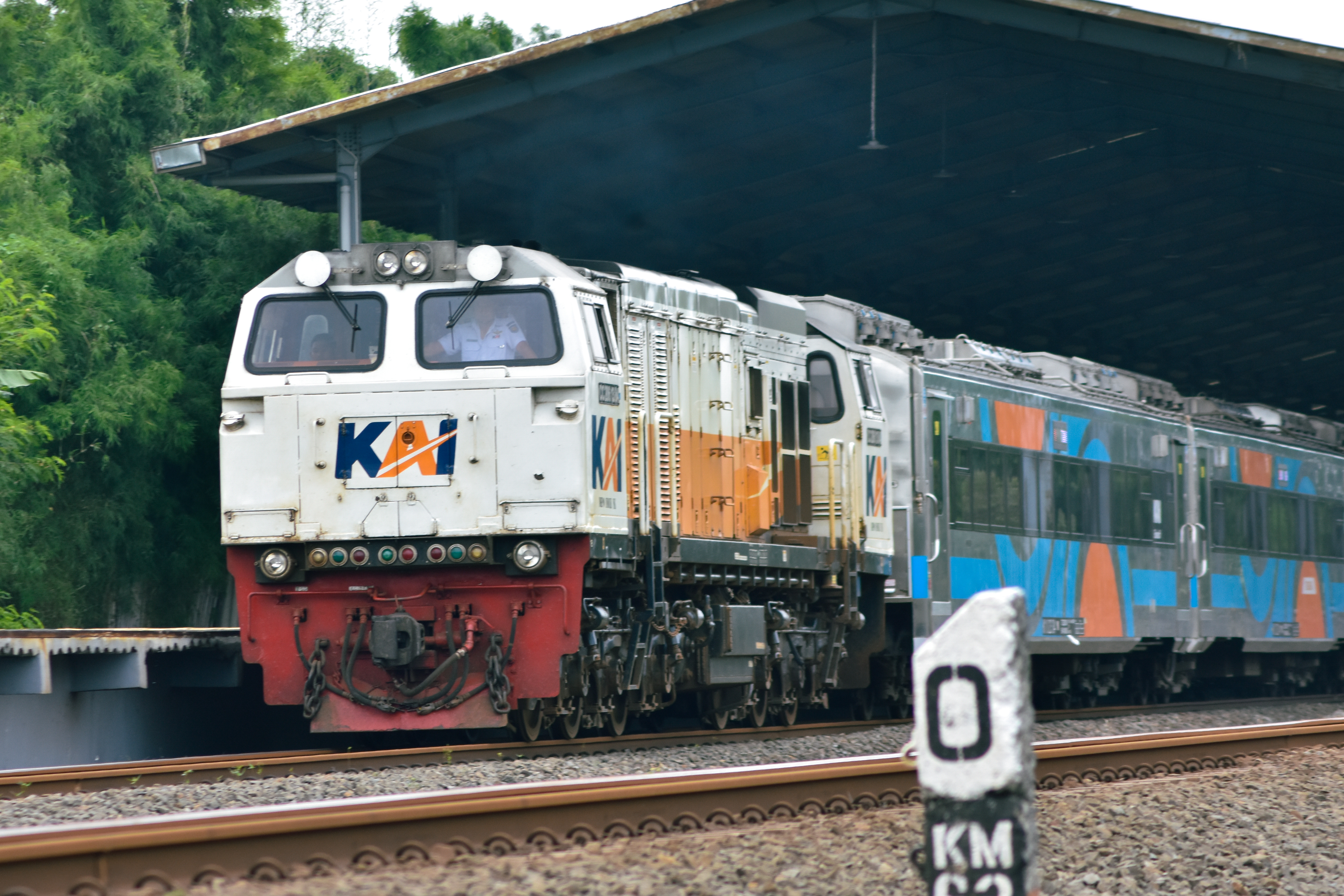
- Taksaka train 44 in Karawang Station heading to Yogyakarta, 2025

Overview
- Service type: Inter-city rail
- Status: Operational (regular & addition)
- Locale: Operational Area VI Yogyakarta Operational Area I Jakarta
- First service: 19 September 1999
- Current operator: Kereta Api Indonesia

Route
- Termini: Gambir; Yogyakarta
- Distance travelled: 512 km (318 mil)
- Average journey time: 6 hours 8 minutes
- Service frequency: 3x daily each way (morning, noon, & night)
- Train numbers: 43-48 (regular); 7007-7010 (addition)

On-board services
- Classes: executive & luxury
- Seating arrangements: 50 seats arranged 2-2 (executive class); 26 seats arranged 1-2 (luxury class)
- Sleeping arrangements: the seats can be rotated and can be reclined up to 140° (luxury class)
- Catering facilities: On-board cafe and trolley service
- Observation facilities: The duplex panoramic glass, with blinds, heat insulating laminated layer
- Entertainment facilities: free Wi-Fi, Air conditioning, USB, Passenger information system, etc

Technical
- Rolling stock: CC206
- Track gauge: 1.067 mm
- Operating speed: 80 km/h (50 mph) to 120 km/h (75 mph)
Route map

The Taksaka train (Indonesian: Kereta Api Taksaka) is a passenger inter-city operated by PT Kereta Api Indonesia, launched on 19 September 1999. The train runs between Gambir (GMR) and Yogyakarta (YK) via Purwokerto (PWT).

There are three daily trips (morning, noon, and night), travelling 512 kilometers (318 miles) in 6 hours 8 minutes with stops at Cirebon, Purwokerto, Kroya (night schedule only), and Kebumen (noon schedule only). Taksaka is the which as non-Argo from another named the "Argo" based from Mountain train with fastest travel from Jakarta Gambir to Yogyakarta.

== Mythology ==
Name of Taksaka begin from the dragon based Mahabharata The epic tells that the dragon was the son of the Goddess Kadru and Kasyapa who lived in Nagaloka with his other brothers, namely Basuki, Antaboga, and others. Taksaka also killing the King arikesit of Hastinapura after Parikesit took the snake carcass with an arrow and hung it around Samiti's neck. After that from the Mahabharata book, Samiti's son, Sang Srenggi was angry about the incident and cursed Parikesit to die from a snakebite seven days after the curse was uttered. However, Samiti was disappointed because his son had cursed Parikesit. Not holding back, Sang Srenggi sent Taksaka to kill King Parikesit.

== Operational History ==
=== Taksaka (1999–2016) ===
On 19 September 1999, the Taksaka train was launched by Kereta Api Indonesia, from Gambir to Yogyakarta and vice versa.

Initially, the Taksaka train was operated using former the Argo Lawu train sets because at that time it operated using executive train rakes formerly from the Argo Muria. In addition, the Taksaka train sometimes operates using executive class coaches made in 1998 by INKA, which were first used by the Argo Dwipangga.

While the Argo Lawu and Argo Dwipangga operate using INKA passenger coaches manufactured in 2016, several trips on the Taksaka train operate using the Argo Lawu consists manufactured in 2008 and glass airplane window coaches from the Argo Dwipangga manufactured in 1984 and 1986.

=== Taksaka (2018–present) ===
In 2018, this train for regular trips has been using the first generation stainless steel executive trains manufactured by PT INKA. The Luxury class were added on 26 May 2019.

From 23 September 2022 to 18 January 2024. the Taksaka train was branded with "Hype Trip" theme, in an effort to attract Millennials and the Generation Z passengers.

On 18 January 2024, the Taksaka train was upgraded with the 2nd Generation Stainless Steel (also known as a New Generation), thus ending Hype Trip theme.

== Train class ==
The Taksaka train has 416 seats across two classes: Luxury Class and Executive Class, with eight cars for Executive Class, and two cars for Luxury Class. There is also a car for a restaurant and dining.

== Stations served ==
On 1 February 2025, following the enactment of new train travel chart 2025, the Taksaka train has used with the new generation stainless steel for all three daily trips.

- Gambir (Start/End) (Integrated with National Monument)
- Cirebon (Integrated with transfer to Semarang Tawang)
- Purwokerto
- Kroya (night schedule only)
- Kebumen (noon schedule only)
- Yogyakarta (Start/End)

== Accident and incidents ==
- On 25 September 2024, the Taksaka 70 (night schedule) collided with a cement truck in Sedayu, Bantel, Yogyakarta on the night schedule, causing some delays that night.

== Gallery ==
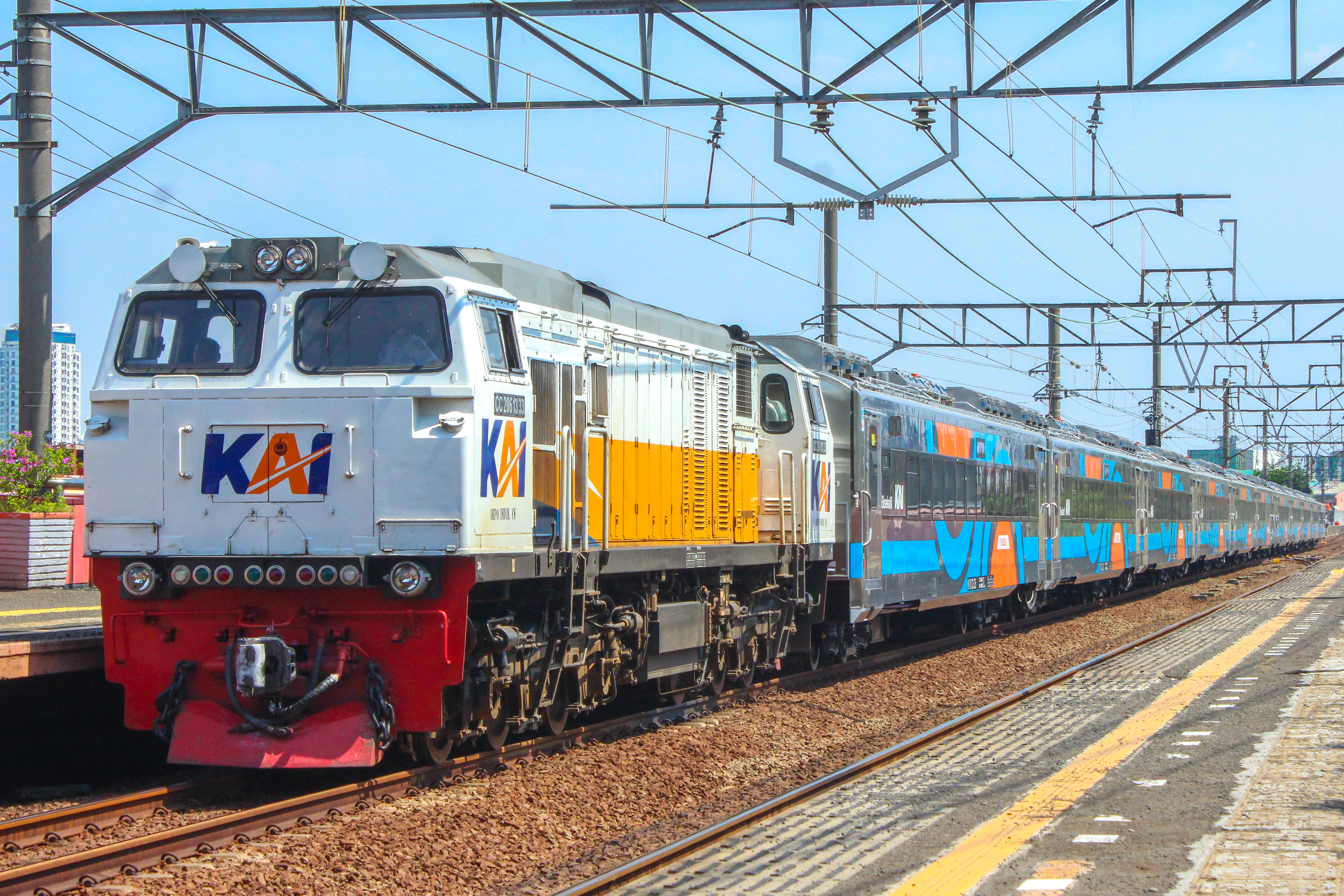
Taksaka addition train use the New Generation, 2023

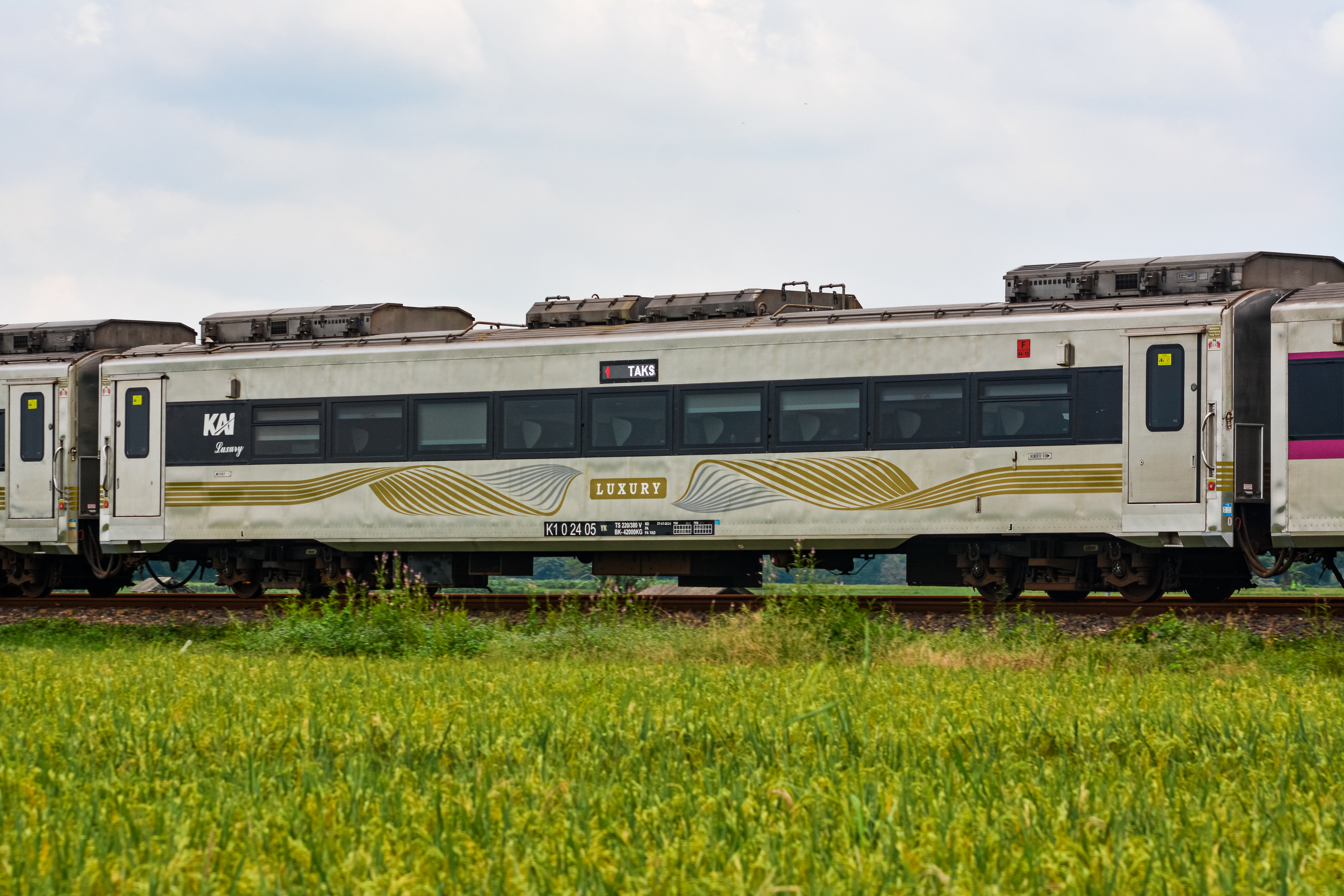
Luxury class passenger coach use by the Taksaka train

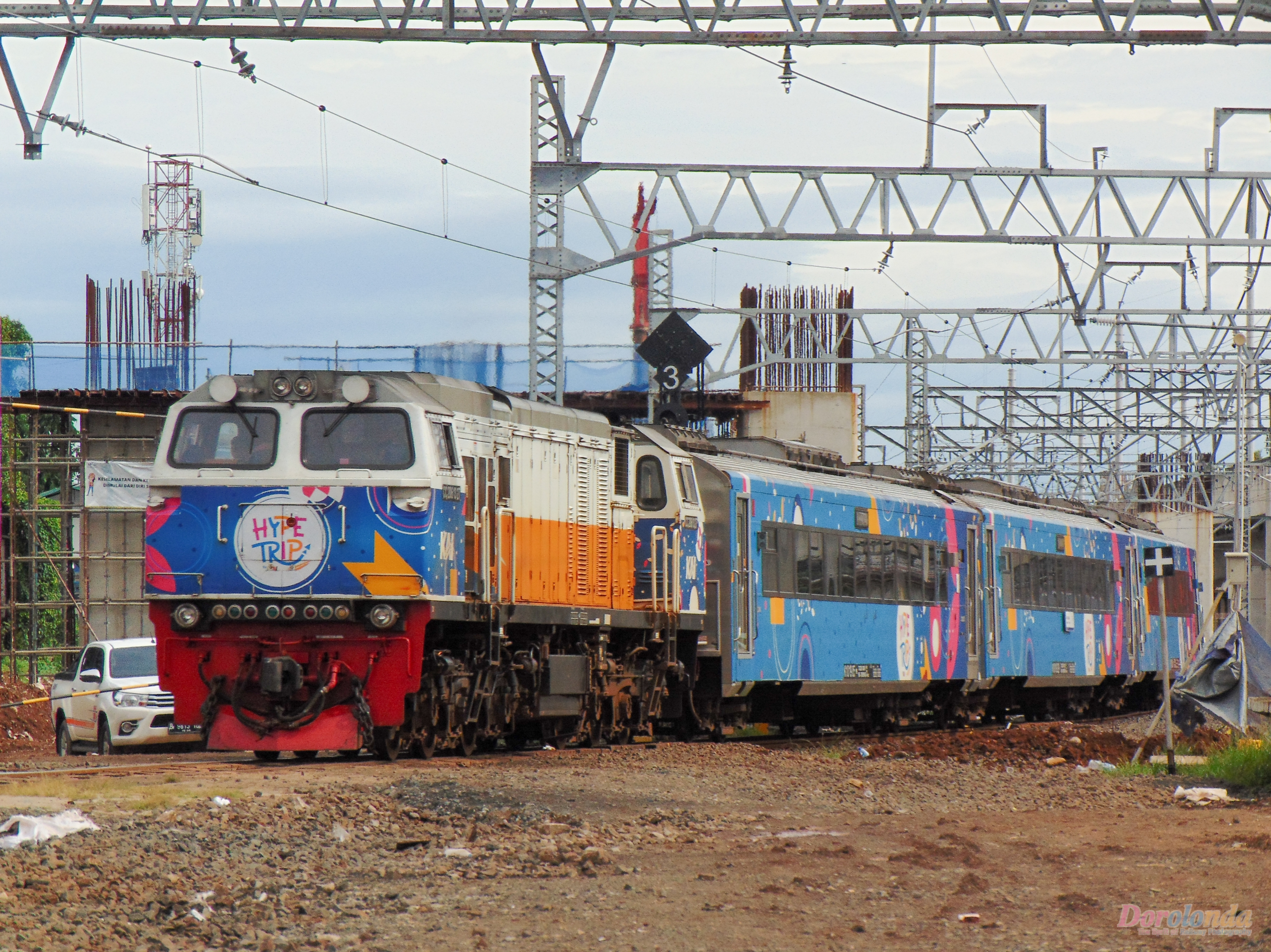
Taksaka train passing in Manggarai heading to Gambir during using the Hype Trip livery, 2022

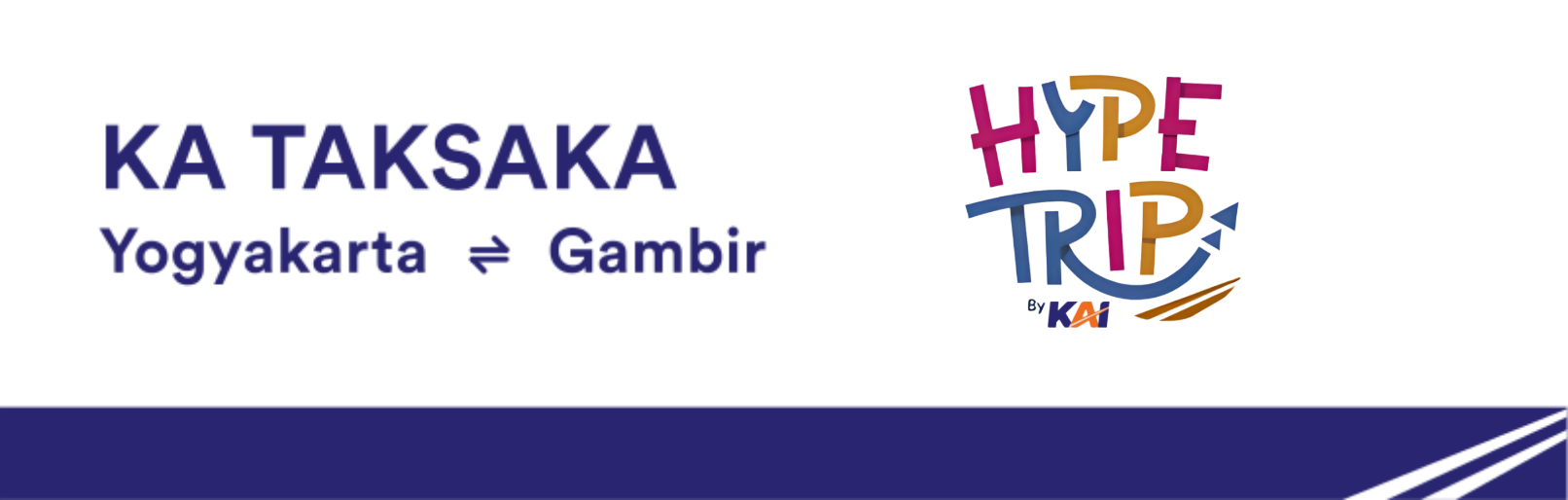
Nameplate of the Taksaka train with the Hype Trip logo (23 September 2022 - 18 January 2024)

== See also ==
- Lodaya
- Taksaka (dragon)
- Sancaka
- Argo Lawu
- Argo Dwipangga
