= 2026 Bekasi train collision =

Train collision in West Java, Indonesia

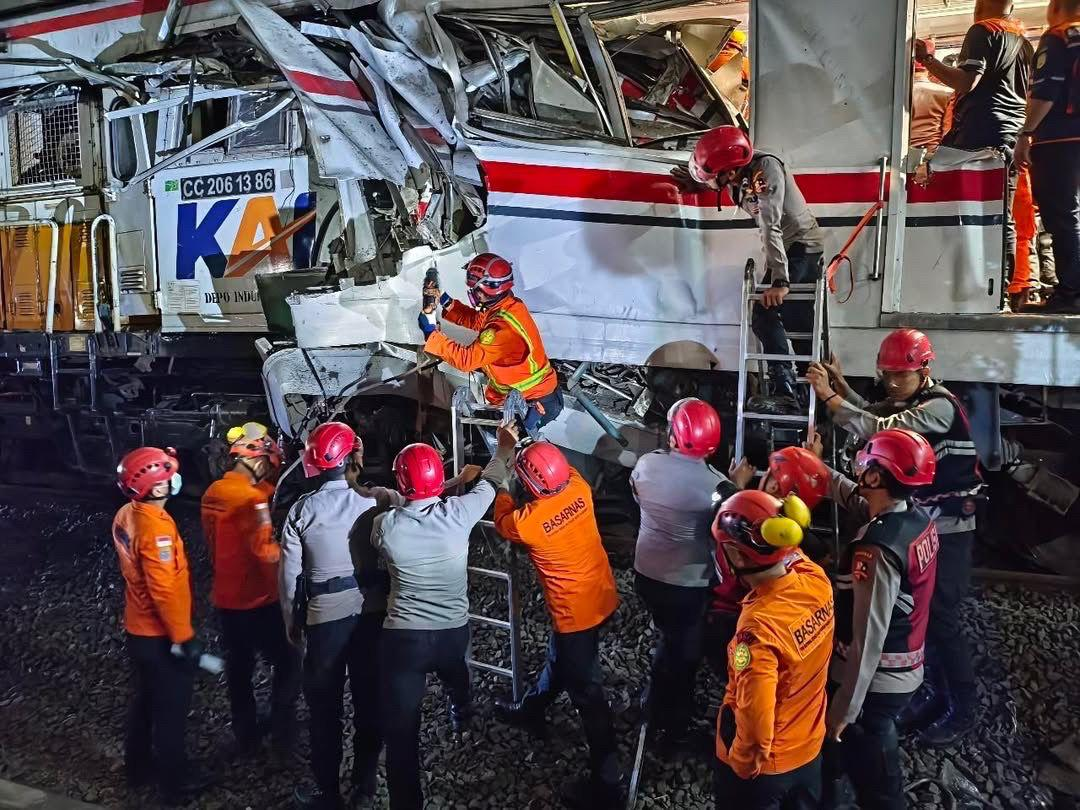
- Basarnas and Polri officers at the crash site

Details
- Date: 27 April 2026 c. 20:52–20:57 WIB
- Location: Bekasi, West Java
- Coordinates: 6°14′48″S 107°01′03″E
- Country: Indonesia
- Line: Cikarang Loop Line
- Operator: Kereta Api Indonesia: KAI Commuter
- Incident type: Collision with motor vehicle (VinFast Nerio Green and Commuter Line towards Angke); Rear-end collision & Telescoping (Commuter Line towards Cikarang and Argo Bromo Anggrek)
- Cause: Collision to a taxi stopped or stalled at an unmarked railroad crossing

Statistics
- Deaths: 16
- Injured: 91

On 27 April 2026, two trains collided at Bekasi Timur railway station in the city of Bekasi, West Java, Indonesia. The crash involved the Argo Bromo Anggrek, a long-distance express on the Gambir–Surabaya Pasarturi route as KA 4 service, and a KRL Commuterline local on the Kampung Bandan–Cikarang (Cikarang Loop Line) as PLB 5568A service.

Commuterline train KA 5181B had a minor collision with a taxi at a level crossing near Bulak Kapal, thus blocking the line. While the EMU PLB 5568A was stopped due to this, the KA 4 train's heavy diesel locomotive crashed into the EMU. The rear carriage of the Commuterline EMU suffered the most damage; being a women-only car, sixteen women were killed. Ninety-one people in total were injured.

The crash disrupted train operations on the Bekasi–Cikarang route.

== Background ==
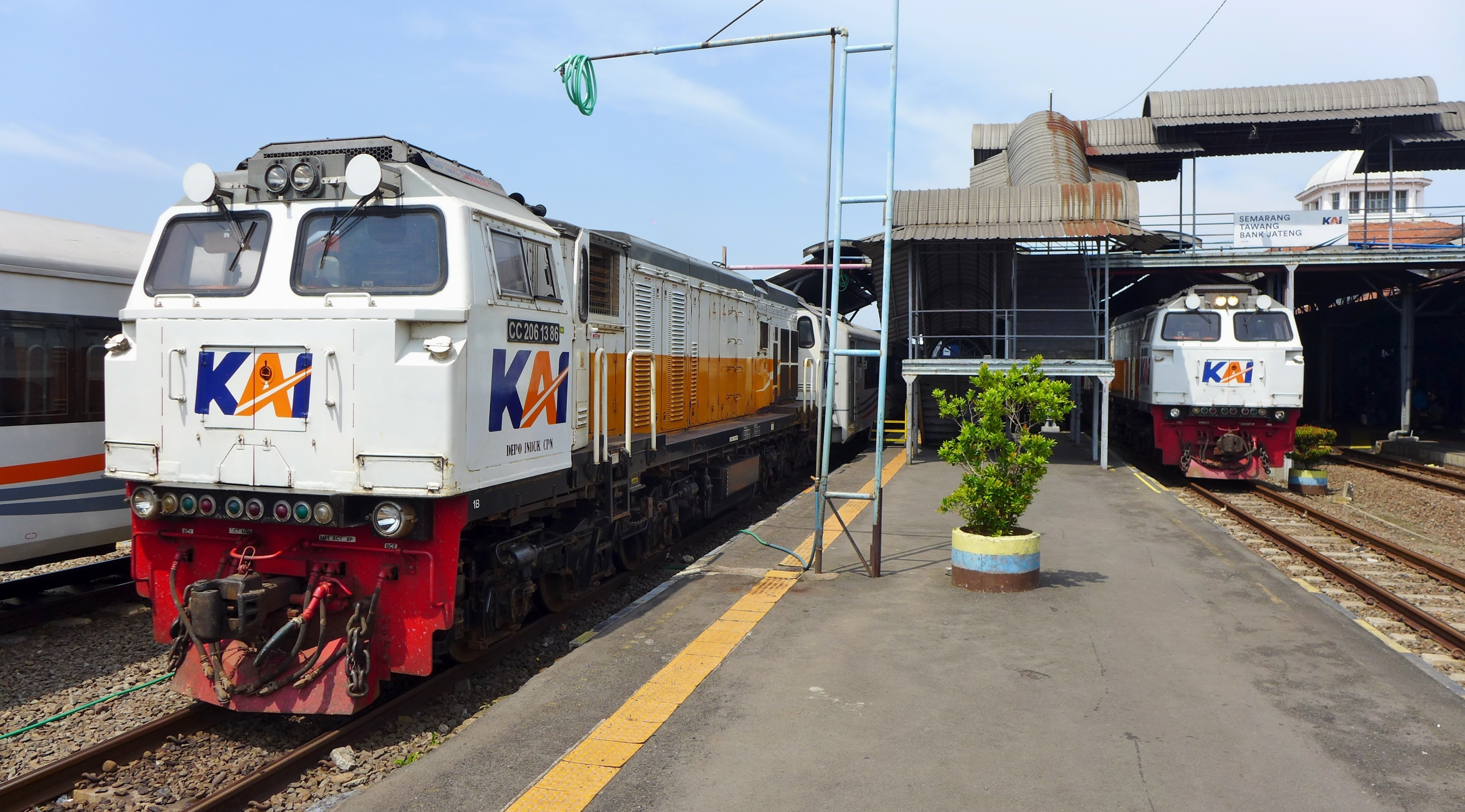
CC 206 13 86 (left), the locomotive involved in the accident

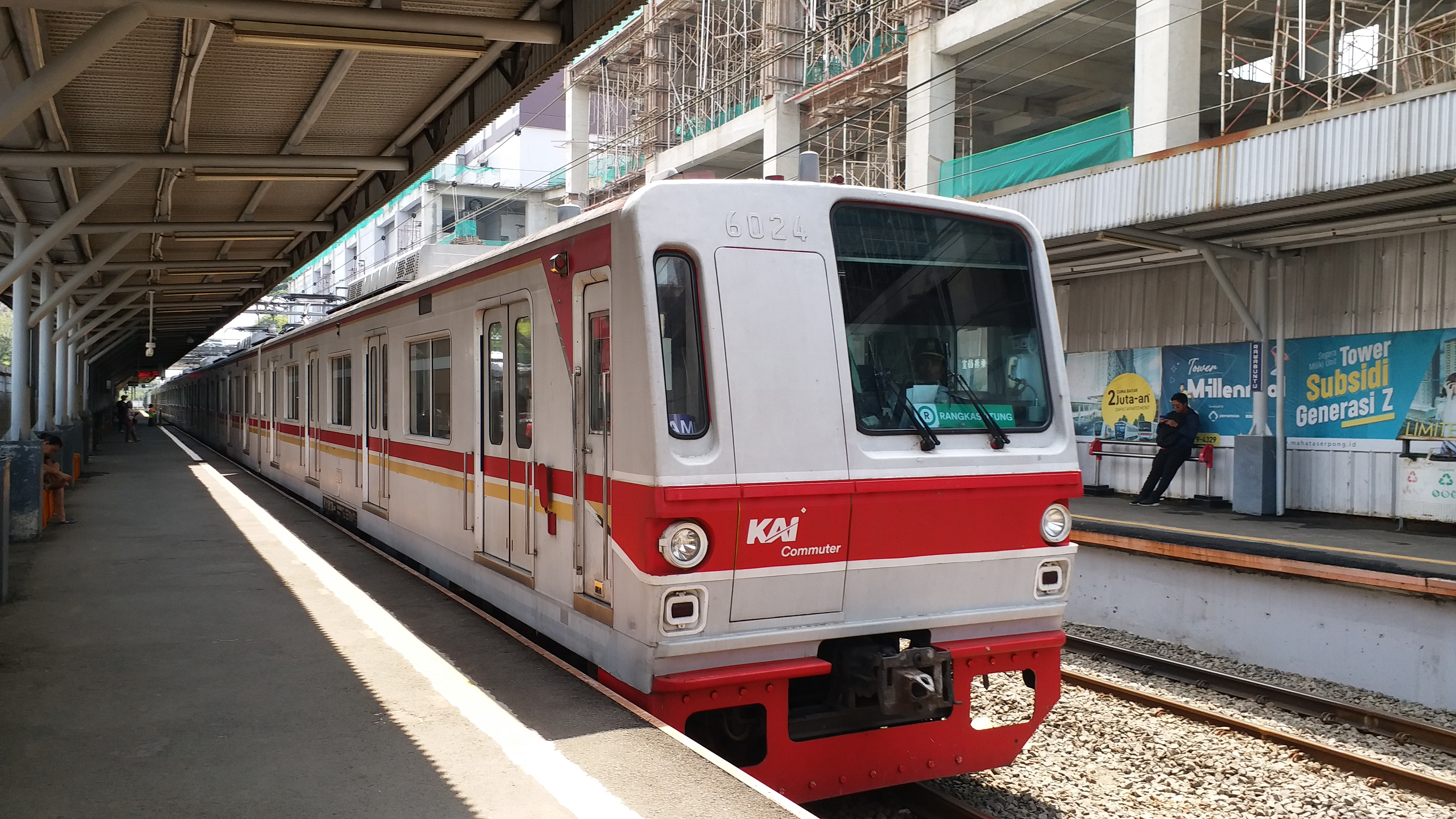
6024, the cab unit involved in the accident

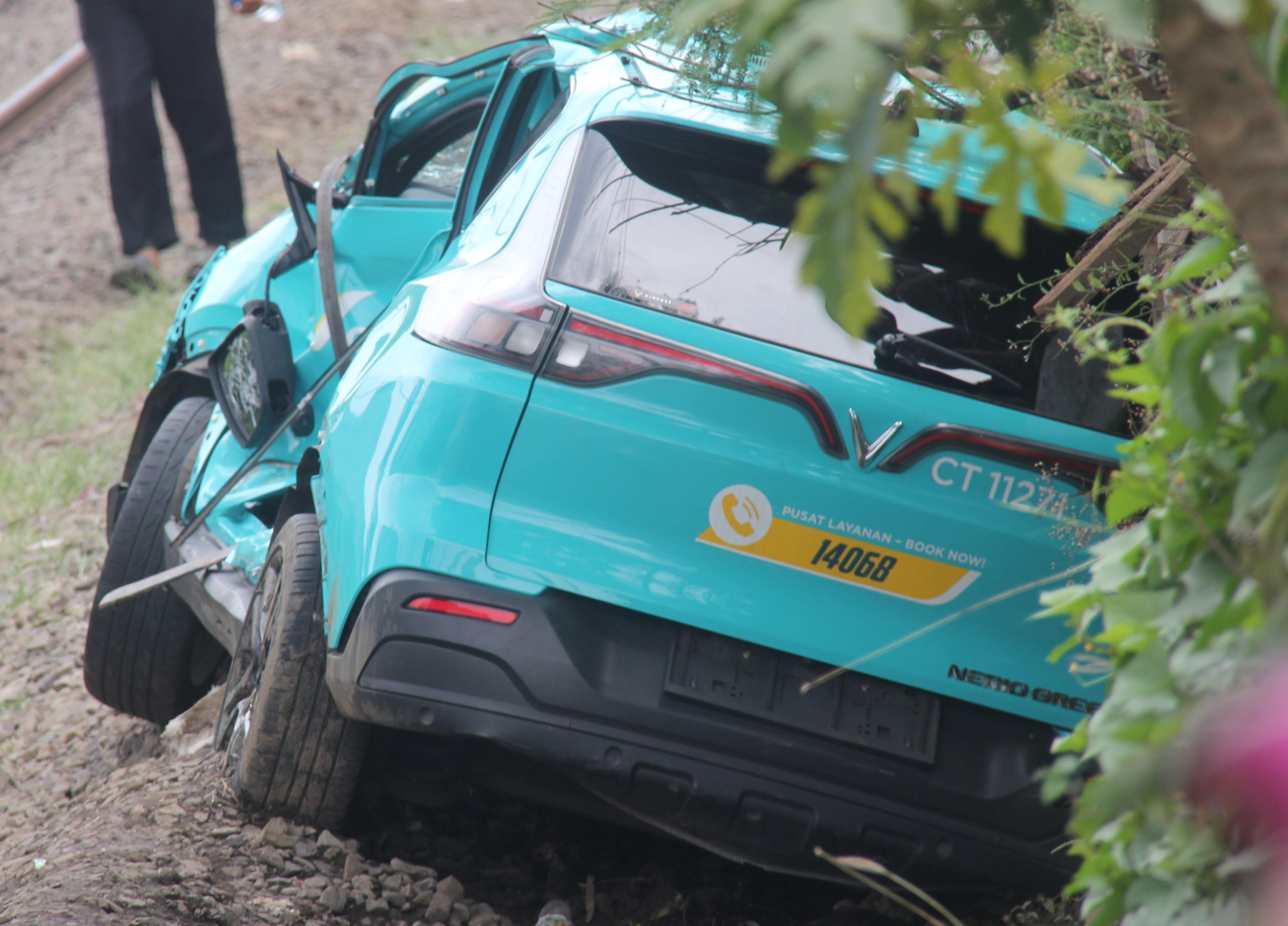
The Green SM VinFast Nerio Green taxi involved in the crash, after the incident

External videos
- Testimony from a KRL Commuter Line passenger regarding the tragedy
- Evacuation process conducted by the joint task force
- | Livestream of the collision between KA 4 and PLB 5568A

The Rajawali–Cikampek railway is one of the busiest lines in the operational area of PT Kereta Api Indonesia's Jakarta Operational Area (Daop) 1. The Bekasi-Tambun stretch of the railway is used by 320 train journeys daily, including commuter trains, intercity trains, and freight trains. The section between Jatinegara and Bekasi is quad-tracked with two sections (double-double track) separated to Commuter and Intercity traffic, while the section between Bekasi and Cikampek is double-tracked. The section between Bekasi and Cikampek runs on open block signalling.

The Cikarang Loop Line is one of the busiest commuter lines within the KAI Commuter network, serving Cikarang to Kampung Bandan in various service intervals. At the hour of the incident, trains usually arrive and depart roughly every 20 to 30 minutes serving Bekasi Timur station for journeys to Kampung Bandan and Cikarang. The service involved in the incident was PLB 5568A from Kampung Bandan to Cikarang, using 10-carriage Tokyo Metro 6000 set 6024F, having departed from Kampung Bandan at 19:47 WIB.

The Argo Bromo Anggrek is an express intercity train starting from Gambir for a journey of 7 hours and 45 minutes, calling at Cirebon and Semarang Tawang before arriving at the terminus Surabaya Pasarturi. The train has a day and overnight service on both ends of the line (Gambir & Surabaya Pasarturi). The service involved was KA 4, pulled by heavy diesel CC 206 13 86, departing Gambir at 20:30 WIB.

== Timeline ==
Earlier collision between Green SM taxi and Commuter Line. This led to a more deadly collision later.

On 27 April 2026, at approximately 20:40 WIB, a Green SM taxi reportedly stalled or stopped at an unmarked railroad crossing in Ampera Road, approximately 300 metres (980 ft; 330 yd) away from Bekasi Timur station. The taxi was then struck by a Commuterline CLI-125 train, running as KA 5181B heading to Angke. As the collision blocked the line, PLB 5568A could not depart from Bekasi Timur station.

Argo Bromo Anggrek's KA 4 service was further downtrack at Bekasi Station when PLB 5568A was held up. At approximately 20:52–20:57 WIB, KA 4 entered Bekasi Timur station and crashed into PLB 5568A. The driver of KA 4 said that the train was traveling at approximately 110 km/h (68 mph) after receiving a proceed signal at Bekasi station.

== Casualties ==
The collision involving PLB 5568A and KA 4 killed sixteen people and injured ninety-one others. All of the dead were women who were in the rear carriage that was designated for women only.

The collision involving the Green SM taxi and the Commuterline CLI-125 train resulted in no injuries or deaths.

== Response and evacuation ==
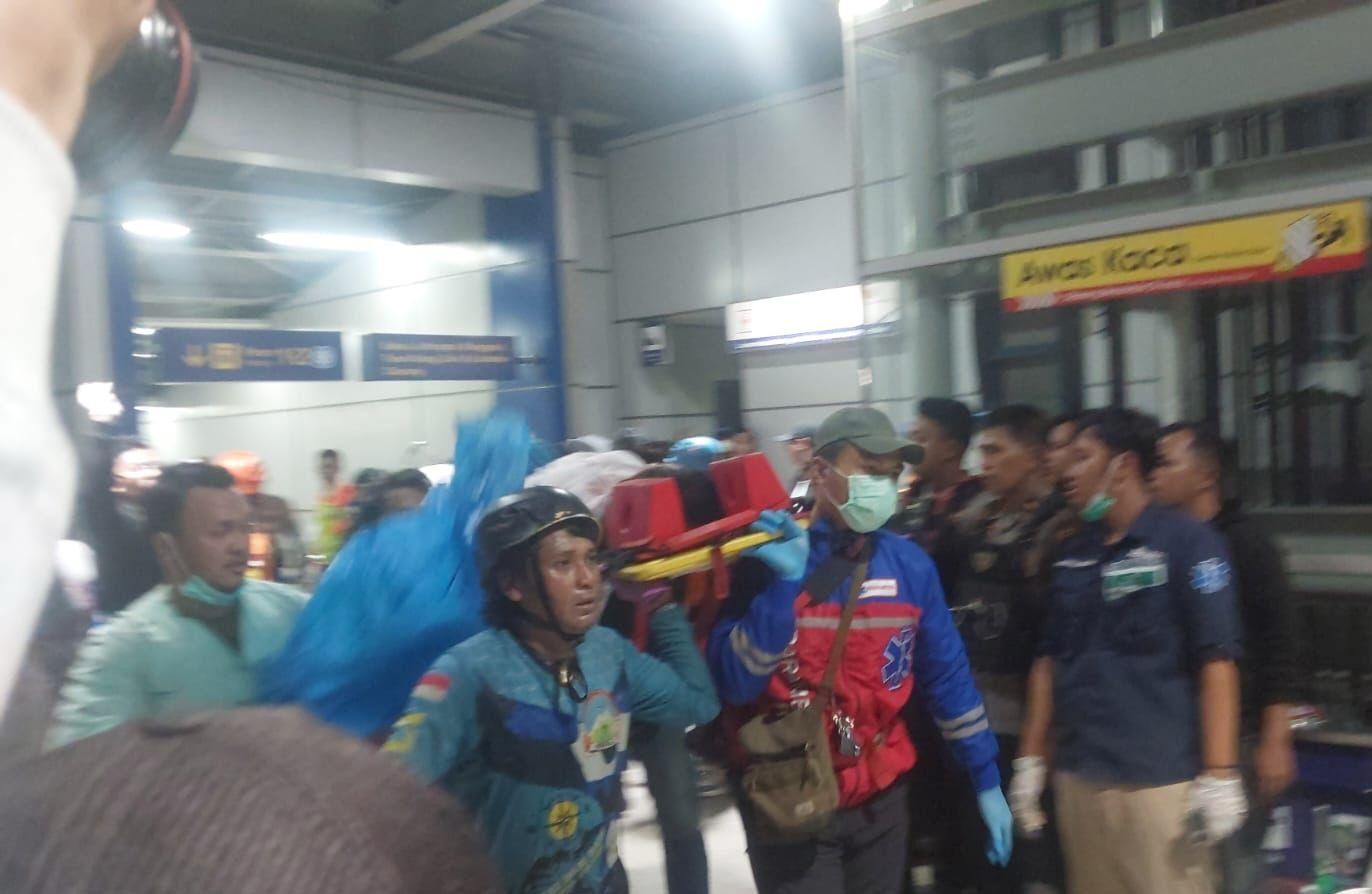
Emergency responders evacuate an injured victim on a stretcher following the collision.

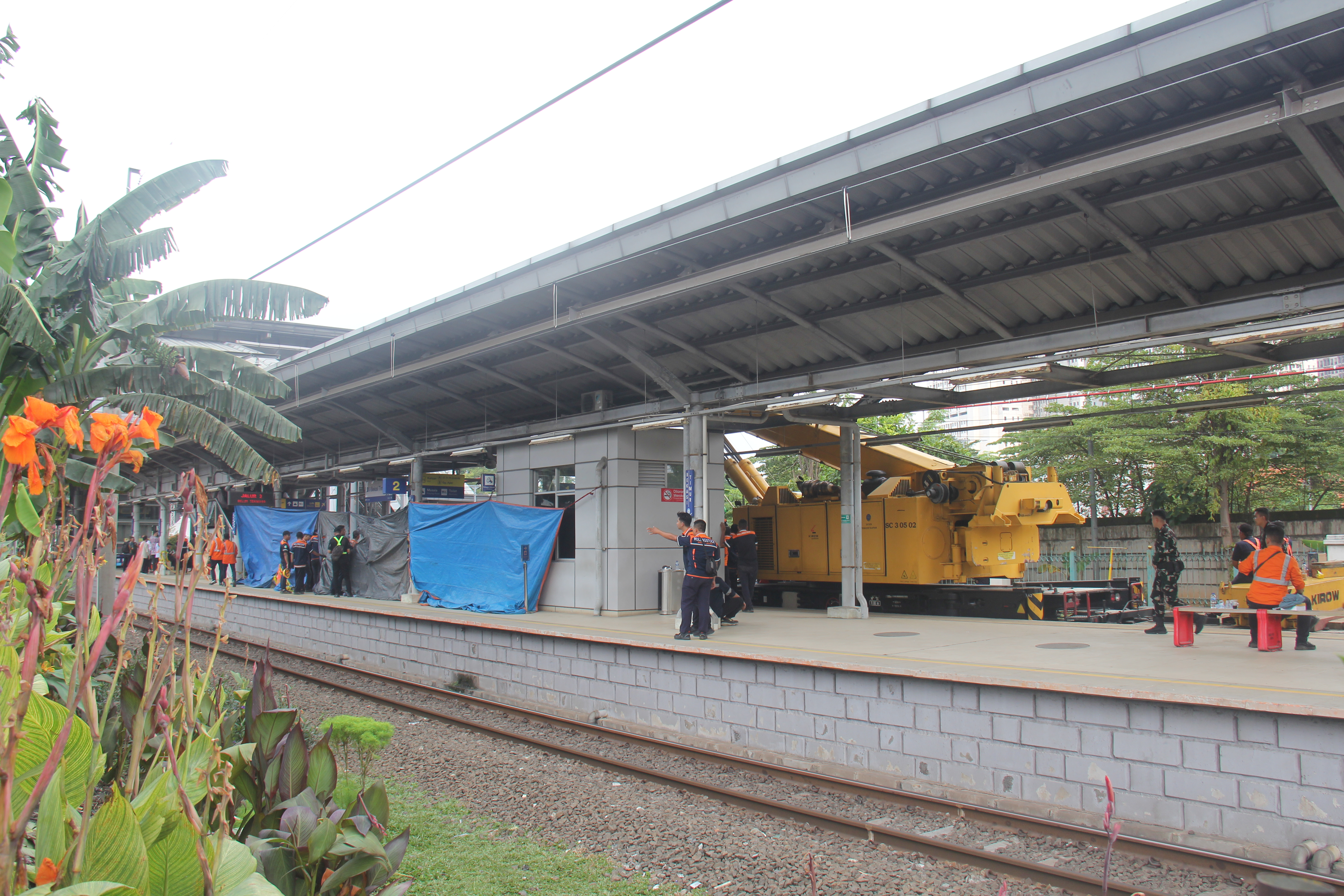
The site of the collision on 28 April, the day after the accident

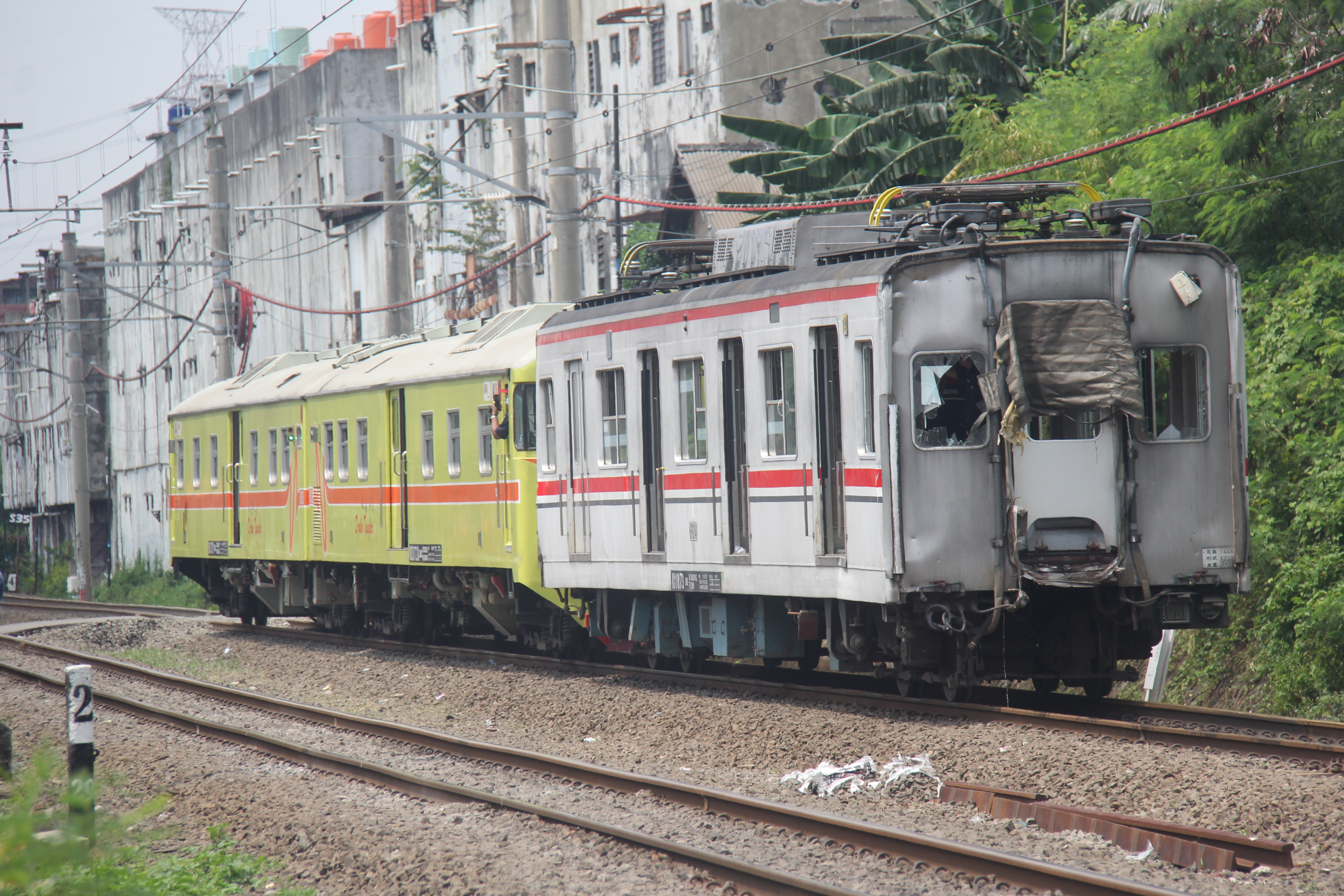
Photo of one of PLB 5568A's train carriages pulled by Helper DMU (KRD NR) Djoko Tingkir out of Bekasi Timur station

Following the incident, officers from KAI, the Indonesian National Police, and the National Search and Rescue Agency, through the Jakarta SAR Office and the Bekasi SAR Alert Unit, were deployed to the scene.

As a safety measure, the 1.5 kV DC overhead power lines on the Cibitung-East Bekasi line and the East Bekasi berth were deactivated. Evacuation was carried out for victims trapped in the rear carriages of the Commuterline train and passengers from both trains.

President Prabowo Subianto expressed his condolences at the loss of life and injuries caused by the crash. On 28 April, he made a visit to Regional Hospital (RSUD) dr. Chasbullah Abdulmajid to visit victims of the collision, and ordered an investigation into the crash to determine the cause. Coordinating Minister for Infrastructure and Regional Development Agus Harimurti Yudhoyono vowed that the investigation will be done in a transparent manner. Yudhoyono also highlighted the numerous level crossings in Indonesia. He emphasized the importance of building flyovers and eliminating such crossings.

In evaluation, Minister of Women Empowerment and Children Protection Arifah Choiri Fauzi proposed to move the carriage designated for women only into the center of the train, while the other carriages were shifted to make way. This was however rebuked by Coordinating Minister for Infrastructure and Regional Development Agus Harimurti Yudhoyono who states that the problem is not gender related but rather the system itself. President director of Kereta Api Indonesia Bobby Rasyidin states that safety doesn't discriminate between genders.

Member of House of Representatives Firnando Hadityo Ganinduto (Golkar-Central Java I) demanded the resignation of Bobby Rasyidin as president director of Kereta Api Indonesia, citing the crash as the reason. Ganinduto clarified that the crash is the result of gross negligence under Rasyidin's leadership and called for an audit. However, political analyst Muslim Arbi viewed Ganinduto's call for Rasyidin's resignation as not objective and that Ganinduto aimed to demand a project or having other special interests from KAI.

On 28 April, Jasa Raharja and Jasaraharja Putera is preparing a total compensation of 90 million IDR (5186 USD on 30 April) for families of the deceased and a total compensation of 50 million IDR (2881 USD on 30 April) to cover the hospital costs of injured victims.

== Impact ==
This collision caused disruption to train services on the Bekasi-Cikarang line and surrounding areas, with several Cikarang Line commuter train trips being delayed, canceled, or diverted.

On 28 April, trips originating from Cikarang were cancelled, and temporary replacement buses were put in place between Bulak Kapal and Bekasi station for Commuterline train passengers originating from Cikarang, in conjunction with existing Trans Wibawa Mukti bus parallel to the line. Meanwhile, intercity train travel to and from Jakarta via the northern Java line was also affected due to evacuation and track repairs.

Service in the Cikarang Loop Line from Cikarang to Bekasi have resumed since 29 April 14:00 WIB.

On 30 April, a temporary memorial was erected in Bekasi Timur station, where commuters and mourners left bouquets of flowers and messages for the deceased. On 5 May, 7 days after the accident, KAI held a tahlil dzikr and collective prayer in Bekasi Timur station in remembrance of the victims.

== Investigation ==
The National Transportation Safety Committee (NTSC/KNKT) has launched an investigation to determine the cause of the accident. The NTSC has also deployed investigators to the site on the night of the accident.
