= Cibitung railway station =

Railway station in Indonesia

C24 Cibitung Station Stasiun Cibitung
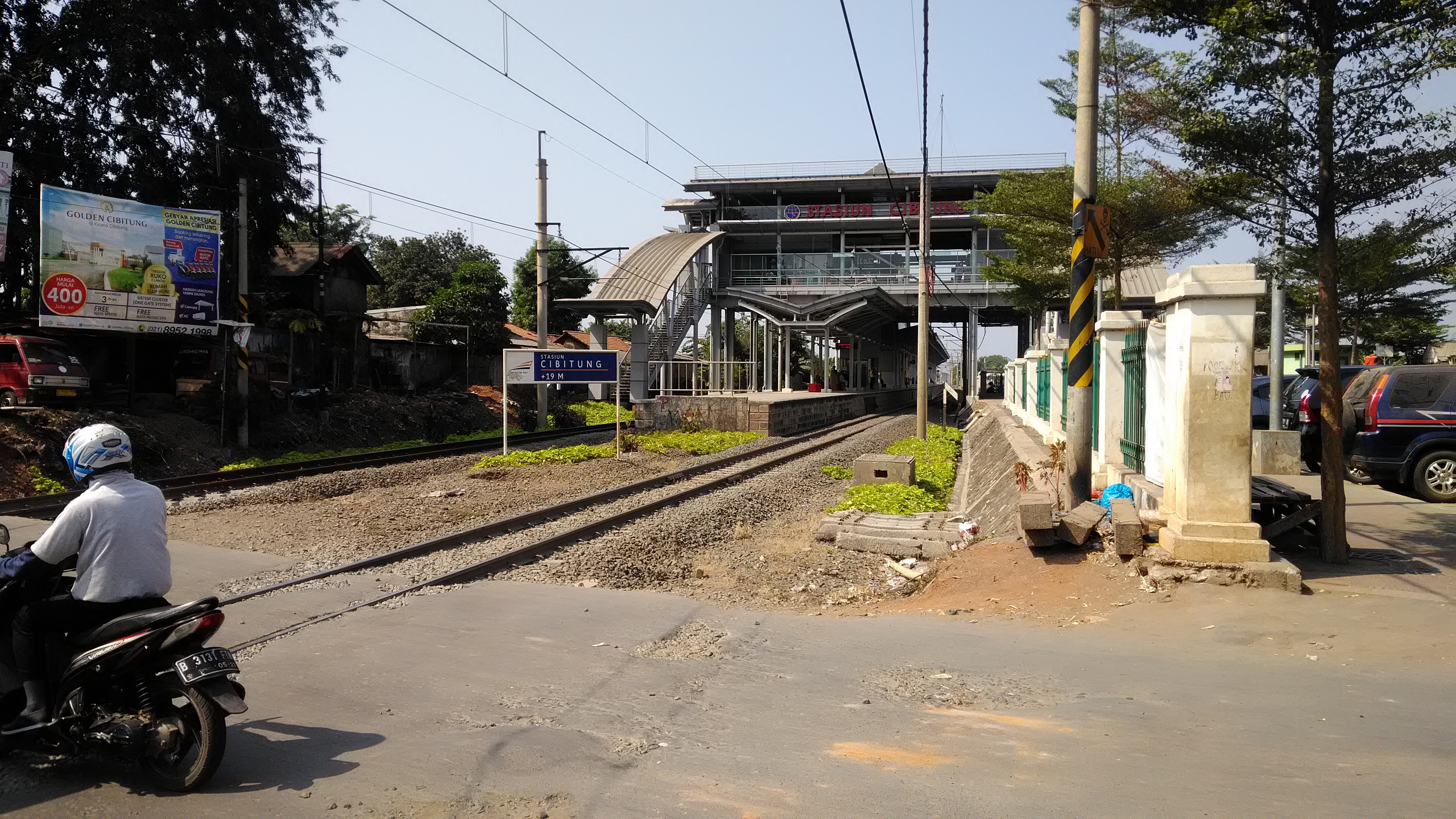
- Cibitung Station as of 2019.

General information
- Location: Wanasari, Cibitung, Bekasi Regency; West Java; Indonesia
- Coordinates: 6.261879°S 107.083664°E
- Elevation: +19 m (62 ft)
- Owner: Kereta Api Indonesia
- Operator: KAI Commuter
- Lines: Rajawali–Cikampek railway; Cikarang Loop Line
- Platforms: 1 island platform
- Tracks: 2

Construction
- Structure type: Ground
- Parking: Available
- Accessible: Available

Other information
- Station code: CIT
- Classification: Class III

History
- Opened: 1990; 8 October 2017 (reopened)
- Closed: 2011
- Rebuilt: 2015
- Electrified: 2017

Services
Preceding station		Following station
Tambun towards Angke, Kampung Bandan or Jakarta Kota	Commuter Line Cikarang	Metland Telagamurni towards Cikarang
Location
- Location within Java

Cibitung Station (CIT) is a railway station located in Wanasari, Cibitung, Bekasi Regency. The station, which is located at an altitude of +19 meters, is included in the Operation Area I Jakarta.

This station is located a little bit far from the Bekasi Regency–Karawang Regency main road which was decommissioned in 2011. Previously the station was small, 1.5 × 1.5 meters wide and only functions as a ticket sales counter. The station platform is low and short. The station building was then enlarged to meet the extension of the KRL Commuterline blue line towards Cikarang.

The station is quite busy because it is located near housing complexes.

== History ==
=== Local station ===
Before Cibitung Station was built there was a signal post on the location. Many residents of Pondok Tanah Mas housing need to stop and depart the train, because most of them work in Jakarta. Along with the interests of Pondok Tanah Mas residents, Wanasari locals also want the existence of a train station. Over time, Cibitung Station was built to fulfill their needs, not only for Pondok Tanah Mas residents themselves, but also other housings as well as Wanasari residents.

=== Reopened as commuter station ===
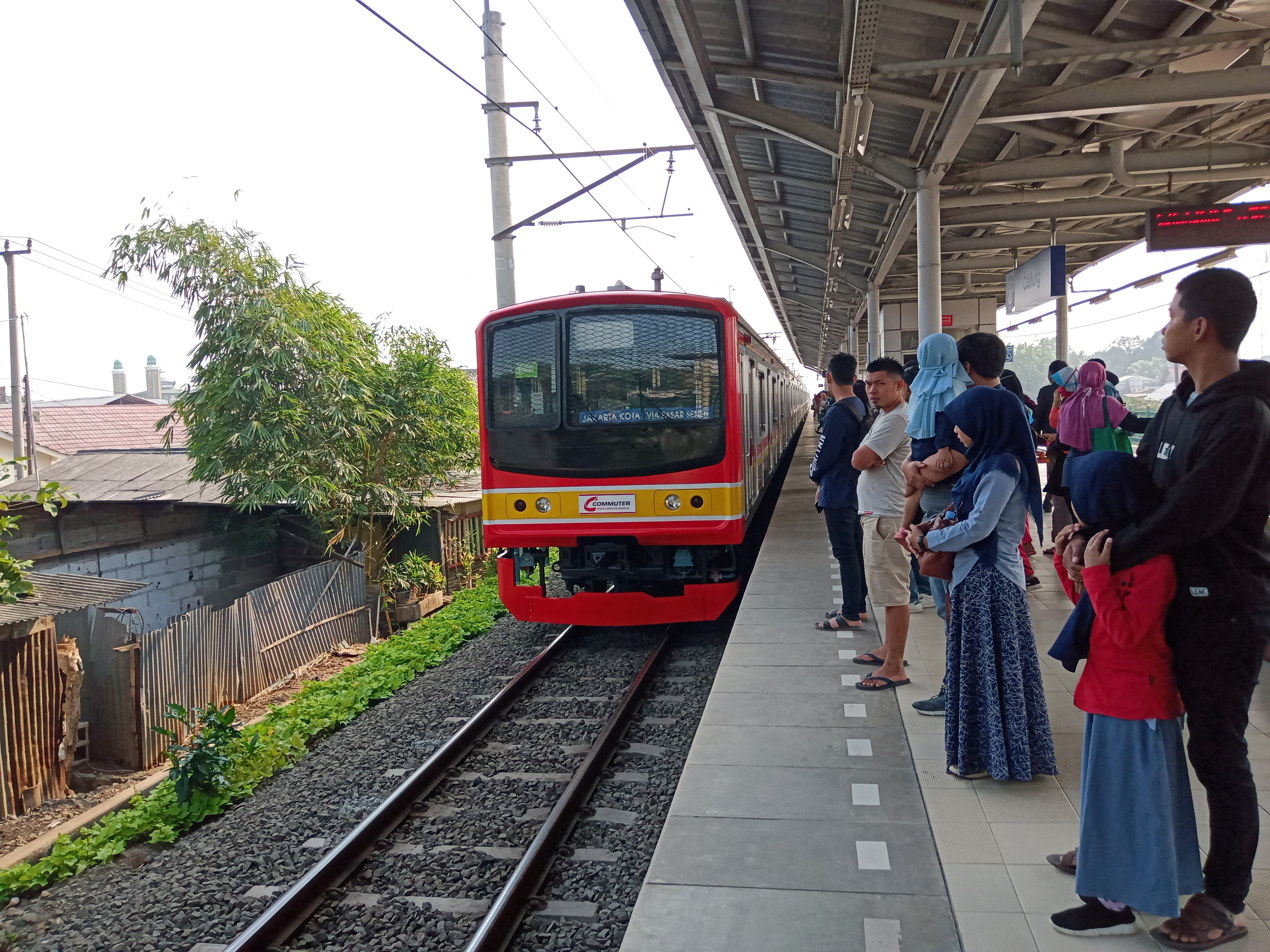
KRL JR 205-148F Marchen Face series arriving at Cibitung Station

Since the implementation of 2011 Gapeka (Grafik Perjalanan Kereta Api) timetables, all local trains, either from west or east, did not stop at Cibitung Station. The station closure left the old station building, which contains the station signboard and former ticket sales counter.

In 2015, the station was seen starting to be rebuilt. On 8 October 2017 it was officially reactivated with a new station building and serving the KRL Commuterline for the Jakarta Kota–Cikarang. The new station building has only one platform in the middle of the two rail tracks.

== Building and layout ==
Cibitung Station has two railway tracks like the Bekasi Timur Station. The new building of Cibitung Station only have one island platform which is placed between two railway tracks.

C24 Cibitung
1st floor
Concourse, ticket counters, and ticket gates
P

Platform floor

Line 2
← (Tambun) Cikarang Loop Line towards Jatinegara loop
Island platform
Line 1
Cikarang Loop Line to Cikarang (Metland Telagamurni) →

== Services ==
The following is a list of train services at the Cibitung Station.

=== Passenger services ===
- KAI Commuter
  - Cikarang Loop Line (Full Racket)
    - to Cikarang (direct service)
    - to Cikarang (looping through Manggarai-Kampung Bandan-Pasar Senen and vice versa)
  - Cikarang Loop Line (Half Racket), to Angke/Kampung Bandan (via Tanah Abang and Duri) and Cikarang

== Incidents ==
- On 8 March 2014, a Haryanto tour bus carrying a group of children was hit by the Menoreh Train while passing the Cibitung 101 railroad level crossing (PJL) next to the former Cibitung Station in the Cikarang Station and Tambun Station compartments which resulted in the locomotive being damaged, but the bus driver managed to escape and the driver's assistant was secured.

Preceding station	Kereta Api Indonesia	Following station
Tambun towards Rajawali	Rajawali–Cikampek	Metland Telagamurni towards Cikampek
