= Metland Telagamurni railway station =

Railway station in Indonesia

C25 Metland Telagamurni Station Stasiun Metland Telagamurni
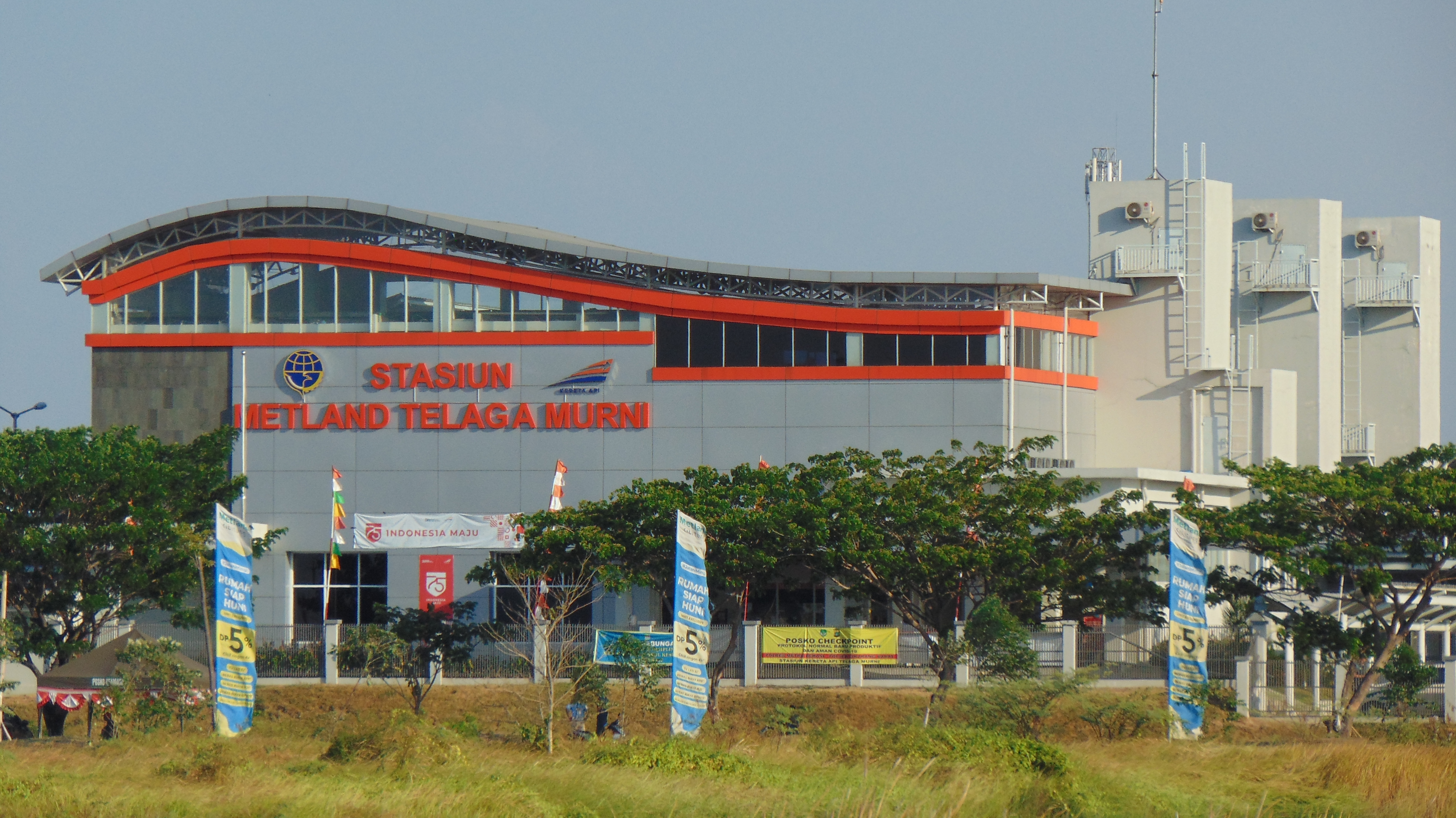
- Metland Telagamurni Station

General information
- Location: Metland Cibitung complex, Telagamurni, West Cikarang, Bekasi Regency; West Java; Indonesia
- Coordinates: 6.257417°S 107.111125°E
- Elevation: +18 m (59 ft)
- Owner: Kereta Api Indonesia
- Operator: KAI Commuter
- Lines: Rajawali–Cikampek railway; Cikarang Loop Line
- Platforms: 2 side platforms
- Tracks: 2

Construction
- Structure type: Ground
- Parking: Available
- Accessible: Available

Other information
- Station code: MTM
- Classification: Class III

History
- Opened: 18 May 2019 (trial); 13 August 2019 (full operational)
- Electrified: 2017

Services
Preceding station		Following station
Cibitung towards Angke, Kampung Bandan or Jakarta Kota	Commuter Line Cikarang	Cikarang Terminus
Location
- Location within Java

Metland Telagamurni Station (MTM) is a class III railway station located in Telagamurni, West Cikarang, Bekasi Regency, serving the town of Cikarang. The station, which is located at an altitude of +18 meters, is included in the Operational Area I Jakarta of Kereta Api Indonesia and only serves the KRL Commuterline. The station has two railway tracks.

Located nearby Metland Cibitung housing complex, Metland Telagamurni Station is a public-private-partnership between Directorate General of Railways of Ministry of Transportation, Kereta Api Indonesia, property company Metland, and contractor PT Majumapan Bangunindo. In a roadmap designed by those parties, the station was built to be used by Metland Cibitung residents to catch public transport without the need to go to nearby Cikarang Station.

== History ==
The location of this station is not far from the Metland housing complex. Even in the roadmap made by the developer company, Metland (PT. Metropolitan Land Tbk) and the contractor, PT Majumapan Bangunindo together with the Directorate General of Railways and PT KAI, this station will be used by residents of the Metland area so they can use rail transportation services without need to go to Cikarang Station. The groundbreaking for the station took place on 8 August 2016.

This station was opened on 18 May 2019 as a first step to trial KRL Commuterline services at this station. Along with the satisfactory evaluation results for approximately three months, this station was finally inaugurated on 13 August 2019 by the Minister of Transportation, Budi Karya Sumadi.

== Building and layout ==
This station only have two railway tracks.

C25 Metland Telagamurni
G	Main building	
Platform floor	Side platform, the doors are opened on the right side	
Platform floor	Line 1	← (Cibitung) Cikarang Loop Line towards Jatinegara loop
Platform floor	Line 2	Cikarang Loop Line to Cikarang (Cikarang) →
Platform floor	Side platform, the doors are opened on the right side	

== Services ==
The following is a list of train services at the Metland Telagamurni Station.

=== Passenger services ===
- KAI Commuter
  - Cikarang Loop Line (Full Racket)
    - to Cikarang (direct service)
    - to Cikarang (looping through Manggarai-Kampung Bandan-Pasar Senen and vice versa)
  - Cikarang Loop Line (Half Racket), to Angke/Kampung Bandan (via Tanah Abang and Duri) and Cikarang

Preceding station	Kereta Api Indonesia	Following station
Cibitung towards Rajawali	Rajawali–Cikampek	Cikarang towards Cikampek
