= Bekasi Timur railway station =

Railway station in Indonesia

C22 Bekasi Timur Station Stasiun Bekasi Timur
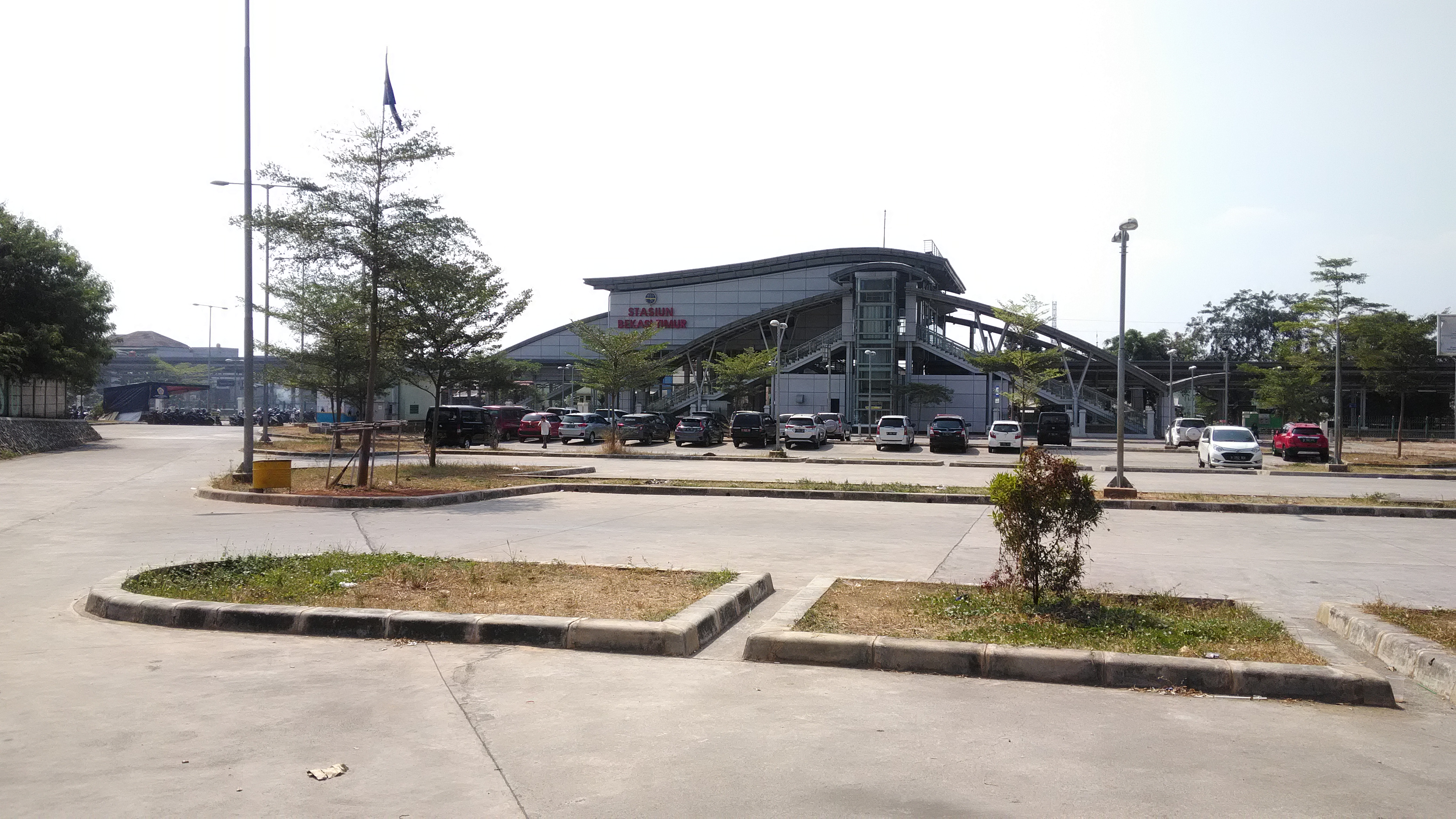
- Bekasi Timur Station as of 28 June 2019

General information
- Location: Jl. Ir. H. Juanda, Duren Jaya, East Bekasi, Bekasi; West Java; Indonesia
- Coordinates: 6.246888°S 107.018111°E
- Elevation: +19 m (62 ft)
- Owner: Kereta Api Indonesia
- Operator: KAI Commuter
- Lines: Rajawali–Cikampek railway; Cikarang Loop Line
- Platforms: 1 island platform
- Tracks: 2

Construction
- Structure type: Ground
- Parking: Available
- Accessible: Available

Other information
- Station code: BKST
- Classification: Class III

History
- Opened: 7 October 2017
- Electrified: 2017

Services
Preceding station		Following station
Bekasi towards Angke, Kampung Bandan or Jakarta Kota	Commuter Line Cikarang	Tambun towards Cikarang
Location
- Location within Bekasi

Bekasi Timur Station (BKST, also known as Ampera Station or Bulak Kapal Station) is a class III railway station located in Duren Jaya, East Bekasi, Bekasi, West Java. The station, which is located at an altitude of +19 meters, is included in the Jakarta Operational Area I and only serves the KRL Commuterline route.

== History ==
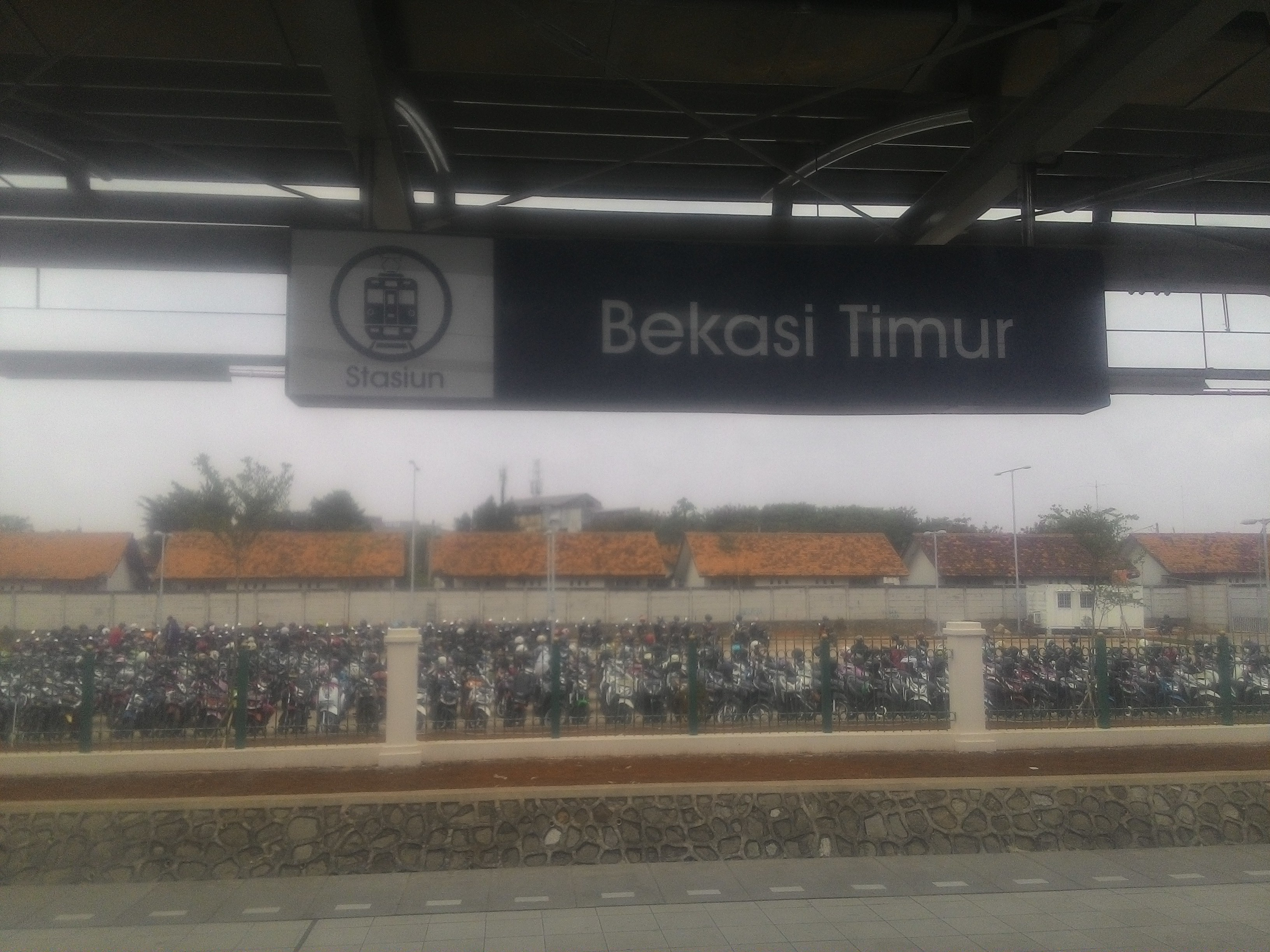
The signage of Bekasi Timur Station

Bekasi Timur Station was inaugurated on 7 October 2017 by the Minister of Transportation of Indonesia, Budi Karya Sumadi, along with the inauguration of the KRL Commuterline Blue Line for Cikarang Station.

The reason for the creation of this station is because Bekasi station has exceeded its passenger capacity by almost 190% from morning and evening trips to and from work, so this station was built to break down the density of passengers at the station.

== Building and layout ==
Bekasi Timur Station has two railway tracks.

1st floor
Concourse, ticket counter, and ticket gates
P

Platform floor

Line 2
← (Bekasi) Cikarang Loop Line towards Jatinegara loop
Island platform
Line 1
Cikarang Loop Line to Cikarang (Tambun) →

== Services ==
The following is a list of train services at the Bekasi Timur Station.

=== Passenger services ===
- KAI Commuter
  - Cikarang Loop Line (Full Racket)
    - to Cikarang (direct service)
    - to Cikarang (looping through Manggarai-Kampung Bandan-Pasar Senen and vice versa)
  - Cikarang Loop Line (Half Racket), to Angke/Kampung Bandan (via Tanah Abang and Duri) and Cikarang

== Supporting transportation ==
Public transport type	Line	Destination
Transjakarta	B21	Bekasi Terminal-Grogol 2 (integrated with corridors)
Transjakarta	B22	Bekasi Terminal-Juanda (integrated with corridors)
Transjakarta	B23 (RoyalTrans)	Bekasi Terminal-Manggarai Station
Transjakarta	B24 (RoyalTrans)	Bekasi Terminal-Kalideres
Transjabodetabek Reguler	BkJ1A	Bekasi Terminal-Blok M Terminal (via Ir. H. Juanda-H. Mulyadi Joyomartono-Jakarta–Cikampek Toll Road)
Transjabodetabek Reguler	BkJ3	Bekasi Terminal-Tanah Abang Station
Transjabodetabek Reguler	BkJ7	Bekasi Terminal-Pasar Senen Terminal
Transjabodetabek Reguler	BkJ8	Bekasi Terminal-Lebak Bulus Grab Station
Transjabodetabek Reguler	BkJ10	Bekasi Terminal-Kampung Rambutan Terminal (via Ir. H. Juanda-H. Mulyadi Joyomartono-Jakarta–Cikampek Toll Road)
Perum PPD	x1	Bekasi Terminal-Tanah Abang
Trans Patriot	1	Bekasi Terminal-Pasar Modern Harapan Indah
Koperasi Angkutan Bekasi (Koasi) Bekasi City	K01	Bekasi Terminal-Bekasi Jaya
Koperasi Angkutan Bekasi (Koasi) Bekasi City	K12	Bekasi Terminal-Aren Jaya
Koperasi Angkutan Bekasi (Koasi) Bekasi City	K19	Bekasi Terminal-Mustikajaya (via Jatimulya)
Koperasi Angkutan Bekasi (Koasi) Bekasi City	K19A	Bekasi Terminal-Mustikajaya (via Pondok Timur Indah)
Koperasi Angkutan Bekasi (Koasi) Bekasi Regency	K01A	Cikarang Terminal-Bekasi Station
Koperasi Angkutan Bekasi (Koasi) Bekasi Regency	K16	Sumberjaya-Bekasi Terminal
Koperasi Angkutan Bekasi (Koasi) Bekasi Regency	K34	Karangsatria-Bekasi Terminal
Koperasi Angkutan Bekasi (Koasi) Bekasi Regency	K34A	Setiamekar-Bekasi Terminal
Koperasi Angkutan Bekasi (Koasi) Bekasi Regency	K36	Kertamukti-Bekasi Terminal
Koperasi Angkutan Bekasi (Koasi) Bekasi Regency	K39	Setiadarma-Bekasi Terminal
Koperasi Angkutan Bekasi (Koasi) Bekasi Regency	K39B	Tridayasakti-Bekasi Terminal

== Incidents ==
On 27 April 2026, the KRL Commuterline train running as PLB 5568A, had an emergency stop due to a railway crossing accident that happened to a Cikarang-bound CLI-125 an unmarked crossing. PLB 5568A was then hit from behind by Argo Bromo Anggrek running as KAI 4 from Gambir station. The CC206 Locomotive pulling KAI 4 penetrated half the length of the rearmost car of PLB 5568A, a Tokyo Metro 6000. At least 81 people were injured and 16 people died as a result of this accident.

Preceding station	Kereta Api Indonesia	Following station
Bekasi towards Rajawali	Rajawali–Cikampek	Tambun towards Cikampek
