= Tambun railway station =

Railway station in Indonesia

C23 Tambun Station Stasiun Tambun
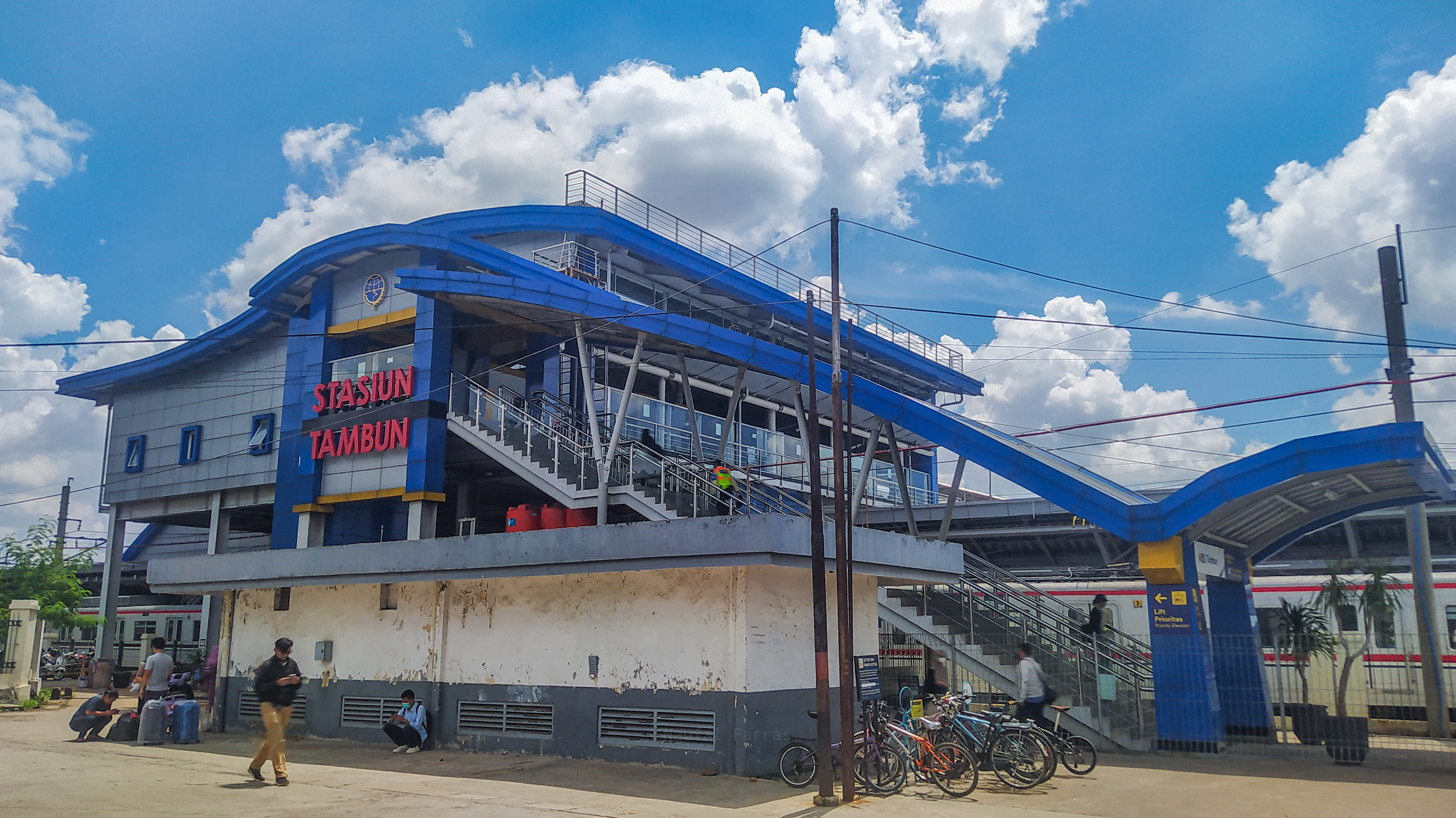
- Tambun Station in 2024

General information
- Location: Jl. Mekarsari, Mekarsari, South Tambun, Bekasi Regency; West Java; Indonesia
- Coordinates: 6.25861°S 107.056°E
- Elevation: +19 m (62 ft)
- Owner: Kereta Api Indonesia
- Operator: KAI Commuter
- Lines: Rajawali–Cikampek railway; Cikarang Loop Line
- Platforms: 1 side platform 3 island platforms
- Tracks: 4

Construction
- Structure type: Ground
- Parking: Available
- Accessible: Available

Other information
- Station code: TB
- Classification: Class III

History
- Opened: 1898
- Rebuilt: 2018
- Electrified: 28 July 2017
- Original company: Bataviasche Oosterspoorweg Maatschappij

Services
Preceding station		Following station
Bekasi Timur towards Angke, Kampung Bandan or Jakarta Kota	Commuter Line Cikarang	Cibitung towards Cikarang
Location
- Location within Java

Tambun Station (TB) is a class III railway station located in Mekarsari, part of South Tambun District of Bekasi Regency, on Java, Indonesia. The station, which is located at an altitude of +19 meters, is included in the Operation Area I Jakarta. This station has four railway tracks with track 2 and 3 as straight lines.

Nearby the station is historic Gedung Juang Tambun building, a former landlord house during colonial era that currently houses Museum Bekasi.

== Building and layout ==
The old station building with cultural heritage status is closely related to the Gedung Juang Tambun building, which has the same status. During the war for independence, the Gedung Juang Tambun was used as a place for negotiations on the exchange of prisoners of war. When the captured Indonesian freedom fighters were returned to Indonesian territory via Bekasi, the Dutch soldiers who were caught were returned to the Netherlands by the Indonesian freedom fighters to Batavia by train through the old station building where the tracks were right behind the building. The station is on the south side adjacent to the building.

This station has now been replaced by a new building with a minimalist modern architecture which is also applied to stations on the planned Manggarai–Cikarang quadruple-track railway (doubled‐double track (DDT)). When it was built, the old station building had already been torn down, so that train passengers had complained about being too hot or caught in the rain while waiting for the train to arrive. At that time, the KRL Commuterline trips had been extended to Cikarang Station. Currently, some of the new station platforms can be used even though the new main building is still under construction.

G
Main building
P

Platform floor

Line 1
← (Cibitung)
Cikarang Loop Line to Cikarang, or from and towards Jatinegara loop
(Bekasi Timur) →
Island platform, the doors are opened on the left side of the train arrival on line 1, or on the right side of the train arrival on line 2
Line 2

Direct tracks to CIkampek

Line X

Inactive

Island platform
Line X

Inactive

Line 3

Direct tracks to Jatinegara

Island platform, the doors are opened on the right side of the train arrival on line 3, or on the left side of the train arrival on line 4
Line 4

Cikarang Loop Line towards Jatinegara loop
(Bekasi Timur) →

== Services ==
The following is a list of train services at the Tambun Station.

=== Passenger services ===
- KAI Commuter
  - Cikarang Loop Line (Full Racket)
    - to Cikarang (direct service)
    - to Cikarang (looping through Manggarai-Kampung Bandan-Pasar Senen and vice versa)
  - Cikarang Loop Line (Half Racket), to Angke/Kampung Bandan (via Tanah Abang and Duri) and Cikarang

== Incidents ==
- On 12 August 2008 at 07.31 WIB, Local Train 681 for the Karawang-Jakarta Kota route derailed on line 4. There were no casualties in this incident.
- On 21 June 2022, at 10:55 WIB, The Argo Sindoro train (with train number KA 11) collided with Toyota Avanza on the Walet level crossing. The car was dragged up to about 1.2 km before entering the Tambun Station, and the driver died.

Preceding station	Kereta Api Indonesia	Following station
Bekasi Timur towards Rajawali	Rajawali–Cikampek	Cibitung towards Cikampek
