= KAI Commuter Cikarang Loop Line =

Commuter rail line in Indonesia

Cikarang Commuter Line Cikarang Loop Line
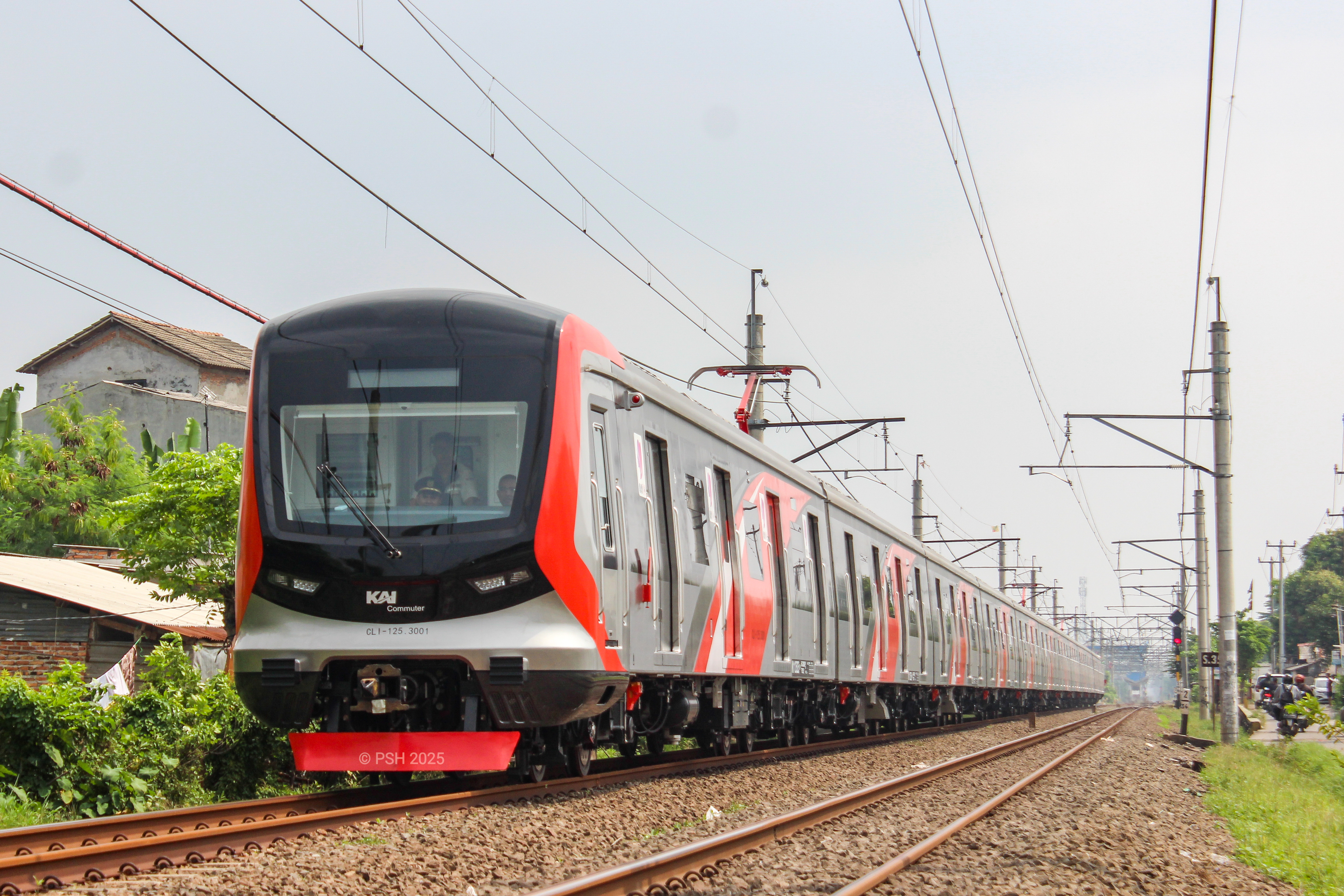
- The CLI-125 series EMU departed from Tambun station

Overview
- Status: Operational
- Owner: Kereta Api Indonesia
- Locale: West Jakarta; Central Jakarta; South Jakarta; East Jakarta; North Jakarta; Bekasi; Bekasi Regency; Karawang Regency (planned)
- Termini: Angke Kampung Bandan; Bekasi Cikarang Cikampek (planned)
- Stations: 27
- Website: http://www.krl.co.id/

Service
- Type: Commuter rail
- System: KRL Commuterline
- Operator: KAI Commuter
- Depot: Bukit Duri (BUD)
- Rolling stock: 205 series Tokyo Metro 6000 series SFC120-V Series; CLI-225 series

History
- Opened: 1924 (Note: Electrified between Jakarta Kota/Tanjung Priok-Jatinegara section.); 1992 (Note: electrified between Jatinegara-Bekasi section); 2017 (Note: electrified between Bekasi-Cikarang section); 28 May 2022 (present line)
- Closed: 27 May 2022 (Jakarta Kota-Manggarai section)

Technical
- Line length: 87.4 km (54.3 mi)
- Number of tracks: Double-track; Quadruple-track
- Track gauge: 1,067 mm (3 ft 6 in)
- Electrification: 1,500 V DC overhead line
- Operating speed: 75–95 km/h (45–60 mph)

The Cikarang Loop Line (formerly Bekasi Line and Cikarang Line), officially the Cikarang Commuter Line, is a commuter rail line in Jakarta, Indonesia which is operated by PT Kereta Commuter Indonesia (KCI). The line connects Kampung Bandan station in North Jakarta and Cikarang station in Cikarang, Bekasi Regency, West Java. On maps and diagrams, the line is shown using the color "blue" ( ). Jakarta Kota–Cikarang is the extension of previously Jakarta Kota–Bekasi line which connects to Cikarang since 8 October 2017.

As of 2015, the line is the third-busiest line in the KA Commuter system, after red line and yellow line.

Before 28 May 2022, there used to be two routes operating between Jakarta Kota and Bekasi. One serves via Manggarai and other one via Pasar Senen. Line and stations between Jakarta Kota and Manggarai were shared with the Jakarta Kota–Bogor line.

KAI Commuter announced on 21 May 2022 that the line will be renamed as Cikarang Loop Line with new abbreviation (C) by 28 May 2022, as part of Manggarai station upgrade. The line ceased operating to Jakarta Kota and no longer serves Jakarta Kota–Manggarai segment, which is served exclusively by the Bogor Line. Trains from Bekasi or Cikarang arriving at Jatinegara now continue through city loop previously used by Loop Line, clockwise or counterclockwise, and then return to Bekasi or Cikarang. Several trains end their journey at Angke or Kampung Bandan without looping. In response to passenger congestion at Manggarai, a feeder service serving Manggarai–Angke/Kampung Bandan portion of the line was introduced on 30 May 2022 to minimise waiting time.

== Route patterns ==
=== Main line ===
There are eight main service patterns of the line.

Service pattern	Route	Listed as	Stations served
Cikarang full racket, counterclockwise	Departing: Cikarang → Bekasi → Jatinegara; First-half loop: Jatinegara → Pasar Senen → Kampung Bandan; Second-half loop: Kampung Bandan → Manggarai → Jatinegara; Terminating: Jatinegara → Bekasi → Cikarang	Departing to first-half loop: "Kampung Bandan via Pasar Senen"; Second-half loop to terminating: "Cikarang via Manggarai"	14 stations of the loop (unidirectional); 7 stations from Jatinegara to Bekasi (bidirectional); 5 stations from Bekasi Timur to Cikarang (bidirectional)
Bekasi full racket, counterclockwise	Departing: Bekasi → Jatinegara; First-half loop: Jatinegara → Pasar Senen → Kampung Bandan; Second-half loop: Kampung Bandan → Manggarai → Jatinegara; Terminating: Jatinegara → Bekasi	Departing to first-half loop: "Kampung Bandan via Pasar Senen"; Second-half loop to terminating: "Bekasi via Manggarai"	14 stations of the loop (unidirectional); 7 stations from Jatinegara to Bekasi (bidirectional)
Cikarang full racket, clockwise	Departing: Cikarang → Bekasi → Jatinegara; First-half loop: Jatinegara → Manggarai → Kampung Bandan; Second-half loop: Kampung Bandan → Gang Sentiong (excluding Pasar Senen) → Jatinegara; Terminating: Jatinegara → Bekasi → Cikarang	Departing to first-half loop: "Kampung Bandan via Manggarai"; Second-half loop to terminating: "Cikarang"	13 stations of the loop (excluding Pasar Senen, unidirectional); 7 stations from Jatinegara to Bekasi (bidirectional); 5 stations from Bekasi Timur to Cikarang (bidirectional)
Bekasi full racket, clockwise	Departing: Bekasi → Jatinegara; First-half loop: Jatinegara → Manggarai → Kampung Bandan; Second-half loop: Kampung Bandan → Gang Sentiong (excluding Pasar Senen) → Jatinegara; Terminating: Jatinegara → Bekasi	Departing to first-half loop: "Kampung Bandan via Manggarai"; Second-half loop to terminating: "Bekasi"	13 stations of the loop (excluding Pasar Senen, unidirectional); 7 stations from Jatinegara to Bekasi (bidirectional)
Cikarang half racket (Angke), clockwise	Towards Angke: Cikarang → Bekasi → Jatinegara → Manggarai → Angke; Towards Cikarang: Angke → Manggarai → Jatinegara → Bekasi → Cikarang	Towards Angke: "Angke via Manggarai"; Towards Cikarang: "Cikarang via Manggarai"	7 stations of the loop (from Matraman to Angke, bidirectional); 7 stations from Jatinegara to Bekasi (bidirectional); 5 stations from Bekasi Timur to Cikarang (bidirectional)
Bekasi half racket (Angke), clockwise	Towards Angke: Bekasi → Jatinegara → Manggarai → Angke; Towards Bekasi: Angke → Manggarai → Jatinegara → Bekasi	Towards Angke: "Angke via Manggarai"; Towards Bekasi: "Bekasi via Manggarai"	7 stations of the loop (from Matraman to Angke, bidirectional); 7 stations from Jatinegara to Bekasi (bidirectional)
Cikarang half racket (Kampung Bandan), clockwise	Towards Kampung Bandan: Cikarang → Bekasi → Jatinegara → Manggarai → Kampung Bandan; Towards Cikarang: Kampung Bandan → Manggarai → Jatinegara → Bekasi → Cikarang	Towards Kampung Bandan: "Kampung Bandan via Manggarai"; Towards Cikarang: "Cikarang via Manggarai"	8 stations of the loop (from Matraman to Kampung Bandan, bidirectional); 7 stations from Jatinegara to Bekasi (bidirectional); 5 stations from Bekasi Timur to Cikarang (bidirectional)
Bekasi half racket (Kampung Bandan), clockwise	Towards Kampung Bandan: Bekasi → Jatinegara → Manggarai → Kampung Bandan; Towards Bekasi: Kampung Bandan → Manggarai → Jatinegara → Bekasi	Towards Kampung Bandan: "Kampung Bandan via Manggarai"; Towards Bekasi: "Bekasi via Manggarai"	8 stations of the loop (from Matraman to Kampung Bandan, bidirectional); 7 stations from Jatinegara to Bekasi (bidirectional)

=== Jakarta Kota branch line ===
In addition, there are two minority services serving Jakarta Kota that only operates at certain times outside of rush hour (such as midnight and early hours) and is not officially acknowledged on the map.

Service pattern	Route	Listed as	Stations served
Cikarang half racket (Jakarta Kota), counterclockwise	Towards Jakarta Kota: Cikarang → Bekasi → Jatinegara → Pasar Senen → Kampung Bandan → Jakarta Kota; Towards Cikarang: Jakarta Kota → Kampung Bandan → Gang Sentiong (excluding Pasar Senen) → Jatinegara → Bekasi → Cikarang	Towards Jakarta Kota: "Jakarta Kota via Pasar Senen"; Towards Cikarang: "Cikarang"	6 stations of the loop (bidirectional); Pasar Senen, station of the loop (unidirectional); Jakarta Kota; 7 stations from Jatinegara to Bekasi (bidirectional); 5 stations from Bekasi Timur to Cikarang
Bekasi half racket (Jakarta Kota), counterclockwise	Towards Jakarta Kota: Bekasi → Jatinegara → Pasar Senen → Kampung Bandan → Jakarta Kota; Towards Bekasi: Jakarta Kota → Kampung Bandan → Gang Sentiong (excluding Pasar Senen) → Jatinegara → Bekasi	Towards Jakarta Kota: "Jakarta Kota via Pasar Senen"; Towards Bekasi: "Bekasi"	6 stations of the loop (bidirectional); Pasar Senen, station of the loop (unidirectional); Jakarta Kota; 7 stations from Jatinegara to Bekasi (bidirectional)

Note: Pasar Senen is one-way only for counterclockwise trains heading towards Kampung Bandan or Jakarta Kota. Train heading towards Bekasi or Cikarang does not stop at this station regardless of which service pattern it belongs to.

== Stations ==
=== Main line ===
Station		Distance (km)		Transfers		City	Province
Code	Name	From previous station	From Jakarta Termini	Transfers		City	Province
Loop section: From top to bottom (downwards) for counterclockwise loop; from bottom to top (upwards) for clockwise loop
Clockwise towards Cikarang heads straight to Klender
C15	**Jatinegara**	-	0.0		Loop intersection and nominal Jakarta terminus Jatinegara Flyover Jatinegara Stasiun Jatinegara	East Jakarta	Jakarta
C01	Pondok Jati	1.236	1.236			East Jakarta	Jakarta
C02	Kramat	1.829	3.065		Pasar Genjing Matraman (U/C)	Central Jakarta	Jakarta
C03	Gang Sentiong	0.973	4.038			Central Jakarta	Jakarta
C04	Pasar Senen	1.567	5.605		Normal stop (counterclockwise) **Pass-through** (clockwise) Pasar Senen Senen (planned) Senen Toyota Rangga Jaga Jakarta Senen Bus Terminal (via short walk)	Central Jakarta	Jakarta
C05	Kemayoran	1.436	7.041			Central Jakarta	Jakarta
C06	Rajawali	1.901	8.942			Central Jakarta	Jakarta
C07 TP02	**Kampung Bandan**	1.444	10.386	KA Commuter Line Jakarta Kota–Tanjung Priok	Interchange station to Terminus of some clockwise half-racket services (full-racket trains will continue through the loop on its direction)	North Jakarta	Jakarta
C08	**Angke**	4.102	13.540		Terminus of some clockwise half-racket services (full-racket trains will continue through the loop on its direction)	West Jakarta	Jakarta
C09 T01 A03	Duri	1.230	14.770	KA Commuter Line Duri–Tangerang Soekarno–Hatta Airport Rail Link	Interchange station to or	West Jakarta	Jakarta
C10 R01	**Tanah Abang**	3.632	18.402	KA Commuter Line Tanah Abang–Rangkasbitung	Interchange station to Cideng (planned)	Central Jakarta	Jakarta
	Karet			**Ghost station**		Central Jakarta	Jakarta
C11 A02	BNI City			Soekarno–Hatta Airport Rail Link	Interchange station to	Central Jakarta	Jakarta
C12	Sudirman	0.811	21.242		Dukuh Atas BNI Dukuh Atas BNI Dukuh Atas Galunggung	Central Jakarta	Jakarta
	Mampang			**Ghost station**		Central Jakarta	Jakarta
C13 B09 A01	**Manggarai**	3.186	24.428	KAI Commuter Bogor Line Soekarno–Hatta Airport Rail Link	Some trains (feeder train) end here Interchange station to or Manggarai (U/C) Manggarai Manggarai Manggarai Bus Terminal (via short walk)	South Jakarta	Jakarta
C14	Matraman				Matraman Baru	East Jakarta	Jakarta
C15	**Jatinegara**	2.6			Loop intersection and nominal Jakarta terminus. Counterclockwise trains head to Klender. Jatinegara Flyover Jatinegara Stasiun Jatinegara	East Jakarta	Jakarta
Counterclockwise towards Cikarang heads straight to Klender
Non-loop section: From top to bottom (downwards) towards Cikarang; from bottom to top (upwards) towards Jatinegara
	Cipinang				**Ghost station (Converted into a train depot)**	East Jakarta	Jakarta
C16	Klender	3.4			Stasiun Klender	East Jakarta	Jakarta
C17	Buaran	3.1			Simpang Buaran	East Jakarta	Jakarta
C18	Klender Baru	1.3				East Jakarta	Jakarta
C19	Cakung	1.3			Pulo Gebang Pulogebang Bus Terminal (via 12 minutes' walk)	East Jakarta	Jakarta
	Rawabebek				**Ghost station**	Bekasi	West Java
C20	Kranji	3.1				Bekasi	West Java
C21	Bekasi	2.5			Some trains terminate here Bekasi	Bekasi	West Java
C22	Bekasi Timur				Bekasi Bus Terminal (via short walk)	Bekasi	West Java
C23	Tambun				Some trains terminate here	Bekasi Regency	West Java
C24	Cibitung					Bekasi Regency	West Java
C25	Metland Telagamurni					Bekasi Regency	West Java
C26 LW01	**Cikarang**			LW LJ	Terminal station Interchange station to LW or LJ Cikarang Cikarang (planned)	Bekasi Regency	West Java

=== Jakarta Kota branch line ===
While not officially shown in maps, there are some trains from Cikarang or Bekasi operating to Jakarta Kota via Pasar Senen (vice versa) in revenue service. This was arranged in order to maintain regular exchange of rollingstock with other lines. The branch line operate outside peak hours, such as midnight or early hours.

Station	Distance (km)		Transfers/ Notes		Location	
Station	From previous station	From Jakarta Termini	Transfers/ Notes		Location	
Jakarta Kota	-	0.0	KA Commuter Line Jakarta Kota–Tanjung Priok KAI Commuter Bogor Line	Terminal station Interchange station to or Jakarta Kota Kota (U/C) Kota	West Jakarta	Jakarta
Kampung Bandan			KA Commuter Line Jakarta Kota–Tanjung Priok	Interchange station to main line or Mangga Dua (planned)	North Jakarta	Jakarta
From Kampung Bandan onward rejoins main Cikarang Loop Line via Pasar Senen

== Rolling stock ==
Type	Image	Depot
Present
JR East Seri 205		Bogor; Depok; Bukit Duri
Tokyo Metro Seri 6000		Depok
CLI-125		Manggarai
iE305		Depok

== Accidents and incidents ==
- On 27 April 2026, a former Tokyo Metro 6000 series trainset (no. 6024F) traveling as Cikarang Line train no. 5568 was struck from behind by Argo Bromo Anggrek train no. 4 bound for Surabaya Pasar Turi at Bekasi Timur station. The 5568 train was due to depart but put into halt after a SFC120-V series trainset running as train no.5181 from opposite direction struck a Green SM taxi cab on a level crossing nearby. KA 4's CC206 locomotive crushed half of the last coach of the 5568 train. Sixteen people were killed, while 91 others were injured.

=== Pre-2011 route and services reform ===
- On 27 June 1928, a Westinghouse EMU of the State Electric Railway (then still under Dutch East Indies colonial rule) from the direction of Kemayoran station overran the terminating tracks of Batavia Noord station, hitting a horse-drawn carriage on the road beside the station. No human casualty reported
- On 18 July 2007, a KRL Holec train trainset no. KL3-97228F running KA 423 (Economy) bound for Jakarta Kota was hit from behind by a locomotive being sent to Pasar Senen to carry KA 120 Jayabaya while stopping at Pondokjati station. No injury reported. The KRL set was able to continue its journey without further incident.
- On 30 October 2008, a former Toei 6000 set number 6181F train bound for Jakarta Kota via Pasar Senen variant of the line (at the time being the main route for this line) as KA 421 AC Economy class train was hit from behind by Antaboga 1001 freight train on a track segment between Kemayoran and Kampung Bandan stations.
