= SFC120-V Series =

Chinese-made Indonesian electric multiple unit train type

SFC120-V series CLI-125 series
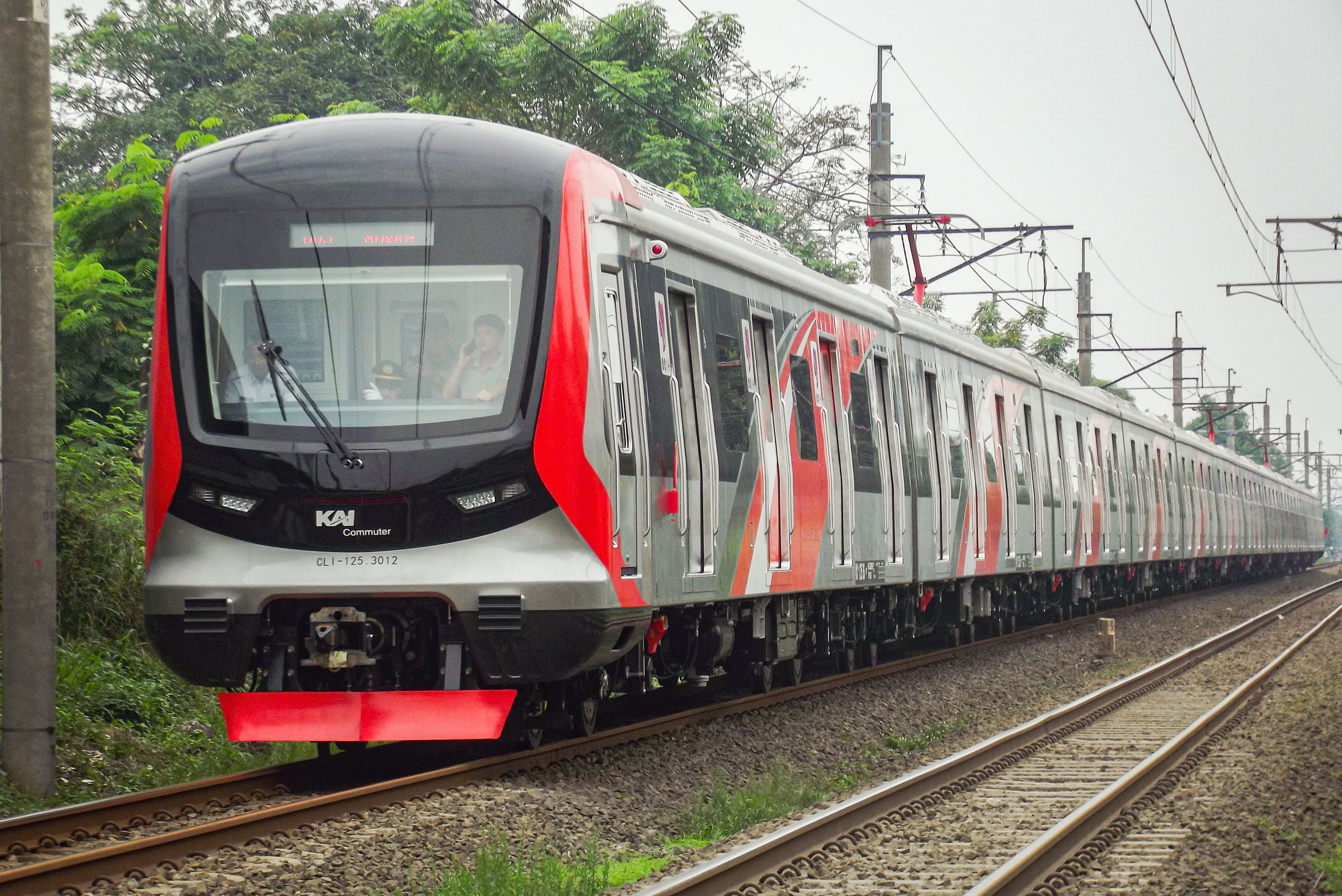
- The third SFC120-V series (CLI125-3000) trainset entering Tambun railway station signal on the first day of service at the Cikarang Loop line, 1 June 2025
- Stock type: Electric multiple unit
- In service: 2025–present
- Manufacturer: CRRC Qingdao Sifang
- Assembly: Qingdao, China
- Replaced: Tokyu 8000 series; Tokyu 8500 series; Tokyo Metro 6000 series; Tokyo Metro 7000 series; 203 series
- Constructed: 2024–2025
- Entered service: 1 June 2025; 16 months ago
- Number built: 132 units (11 sets)
- Number in service: 132 units (11 Sets)
- Formation: 12 cars per trainset
- Design code: SFM138
- Owner: KAI Commuter
- Operator: KAI Commuter
- Depot: Manggarai (MRI)
- Lines served: KAI Commuter Bogor Line; KAI Commuter Cikarang Loop Line

Specifications
- Car body construction: Stainless steel
- Car length: 20,250 mm (66 ft 5 in) (TC); 19,600 mm (64 ft 4 in) (M/T)
- Height: 3,954 mm (12 ft 11.7 in)
- Doors: 4 pocket doors per side
- Maximum speed: 120 km/h (75 mph)
- Traction system: CRRC Times Electric tPower-TN30 (UR1/JP36) IGBT–VVVF inverter
- Power output: 3,360 kW (4,510 hp)
- Electric system: 1,500 V DC overhead lines
- Current collection: Pantograph
- Bogies: SWM-120C2 (Motor); SWT-120C2 (Trailer)
- Coupling system: Shibata Coupling
- Seating: Longitudinal
- Track gauge: 1,067 mm (3 ft 6 in)

The SFC120-V series, also known as CLI-125 series, is an electric multiple unit (EMU) manufactured by CRRC Qingdao Sifang in Qingdao, Shandong, China for the Indonesian commuter railway operator KAI Commuter.

The EMU is planned to be operated by KAI Commuter on the Bogor and Cikarang Line. The first three SFC120-V series entered service on 1 June 2025 on the Bogor and Cikarang Line.

== History ==
The SFC120-V series was ordered following the 2023 used EMU import controversy, which led to the cancellation of second-hand train imports from Japan. Through Government Funding (PMN), the Indonesian government helped finance the purchase of this series.

Initially, KAI Commuter ordered only three sets of the SFC120-V series in January 2024, with the contract worth 783 billion rupiah (49.7 million USD). However, in July 2024, the order was increased by eight more sets. In total, KAI Commuter has ordered 11 sets of the SFC120-V series from CRRC Qingdao Sifang, with each set consisting of 12 cars.

=== Delivery ===
KAI Commuter received the first trainset on 31 January 2025 through Tanjung Priok Port, Jakarta. The next day, on 1 February, KAI Commuter delivered the trains to the Depok EMU Depot through Pasoso Station and Tanah Abang Station using a CC206 class locomotive. The batch 2 delivery of two trainsets arrived at Tanjung Priok on 11 March, with both trainsets delivered to the Depok EMU Depot via rail by 13 March.

=== Trials ===
To assess its operational feasibility and prepare for type test certification by the Ministry of Transportation, the SFC120-V series EMU has been undergoing trial runs since 10 February 2025. These trials took place on the Jakarta–Bogor railway line after undergoing a rollover test in China prior to being exported to Indonesia.

=== Entering service ===
On 1 June 2025, KAI Commuter officially ran 3 of the 7 trains of the SFC120-V series at Bogor Line and Cikarang Loop Line with Bogor line getting 2 trains (TS 1 and TS 2) and Cikarang Loop Line 1 train (TS 3).

== Formations ==
	Designation											
Number	1 (TC1)	2 (M1)	3 (M2)	4 (T)	5 (T)	6 (M3)	7 (M4)	8 (T)	9 (T)	10 (M1)	11 (M2)	12 (TC2)
TS1	K1 1 25 01	K1 1 25 02	K1 1 25 03	K1 1 25 04	K1 1 25 05	K1 1 25 06	K1 1 25 07	K1 1 25 08	K1 1 25 09	K1 1 25 10	K1 1 25 11	K1 1 25 12
TS2	K1 1 25 13	K1 1 25 14	K1 1 25 15	K1 1 25 16	K1 1 25 17	K1 1 25 18	K1 1 25 19	K1 1 25 20	K1 1 25 21	K1 1 25 22	K1 1 25 23	K1 1 25 24
TS3	K1 1 25 25	K1 1 25 26	K1 1 25 27	K1 1 25 28	K1 1 25 29	K1 1 25 30	K1 1 25 31	K1 1 25 32	K1 1 25 33	K1 1 25 34	K1 1 25 35	K1 1 25 36
TS4	K1 1 25 49	K1 1 25 50	K1 1 25 51	K1 1 25 52	K1 1 25 53	K1 1 25 54	K1 1 25 55	K1 1 25 56	K1 1 25 57	K1 1 25 58	K1 1 25 59	K1 1 25 60
TS5	K1 1 25 61	K1 1 25 62	K1 1 25 63	K1 1 25 64	K1 1 25 65	K1 1 25 66	K1 1 25 67	K1 1 25 68	K1 1 25 69	K1 1 25 70	K1 1 25 71	K1 1 25 72
TS6	K1 1 25 73	K1 1 25 74	K1 1 25 75	K1 1 25 76	K1 1 25 77	K1 1 25 78	K1 1 25 79	K1 1 25 80	K1 1 25 81	K1 1 25 82	K1 1 25 83	K1 1 25 84
TS7	K1 1 25 85	K1 1 25 86	K1 1 25 87	K1 1 25 88	K1 1 25 89	K1 1 25 90	K1 1 25 91	K1 1 25 92	K1 1 25 93	K1 1 25 94	K1 1 25 95	K1 1 25 96
TS8	K1 1 25 109	K1 1 25 110	K1 1 25 111	K1 1 25 112	K1 1 25 113	K1 1 25 114	K1 1 25 115	K1 1 25 116	K1 1 25 117	K1 1 25 118	K1 1 25 119	K1 1 25 120
TS9	K1 1 25 121	K1 1 25 122	K1 1 25 123	K1 1 25 124	K1 1 25 125	K1 1 25 126	K1 1 25 127	K1 1 25 128	K1 1 25 129	K1 1 25 130	K1 1 25 131	K1 1 25 132
TS10	K1 1 25 133	K1 1 25 134	K1 1 25 135	K1 1 25 136	K1 1 25 137	K1 1 25 138	K1 1 25 139	K1 1 25 140	K1 1 25 141	K1 1 25 142	K1 1 25 143	K1 1 25 144
TS11	K1 1 25 145	K1 1 25 146	K1 1 25 147	K1 1 25 148	K1 1 25 149	K1 1 25 150	K1 1 25 151	K1 1 25 152	K1 1 25 153	K1 1 25 154	K1 1 25 155	K1 1 25 156

== Interior ==
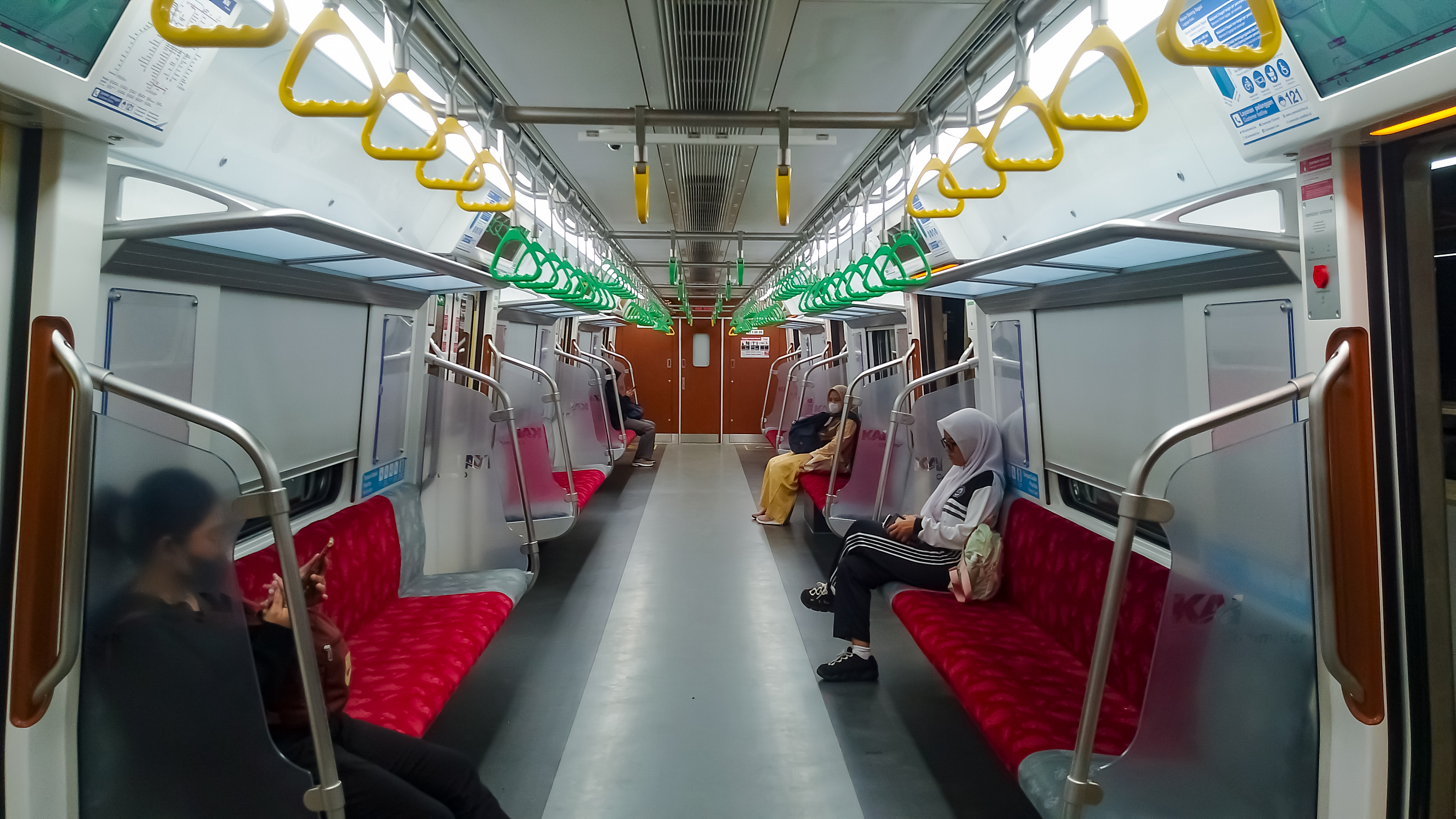
Full interior view

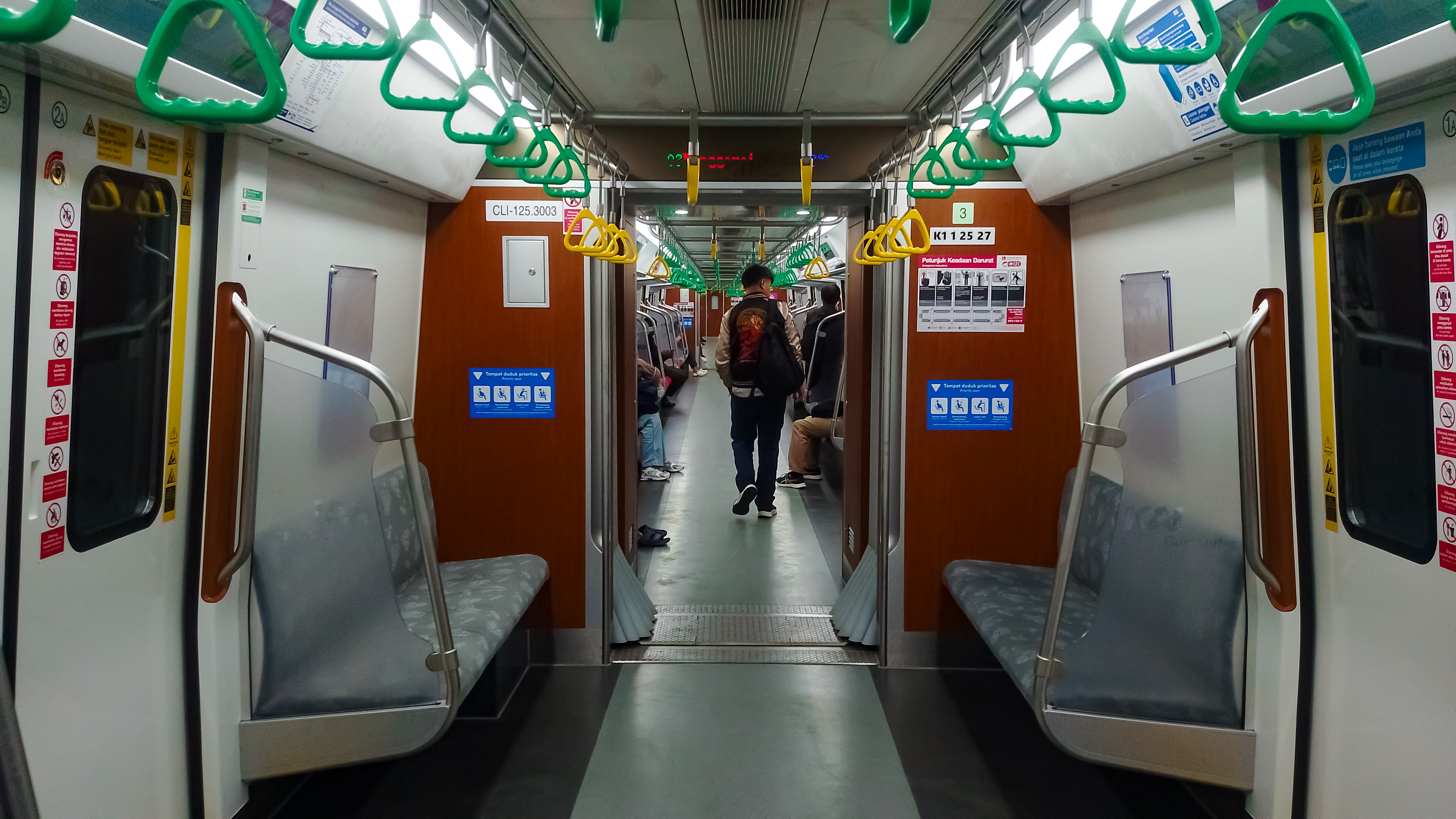
Priority seat

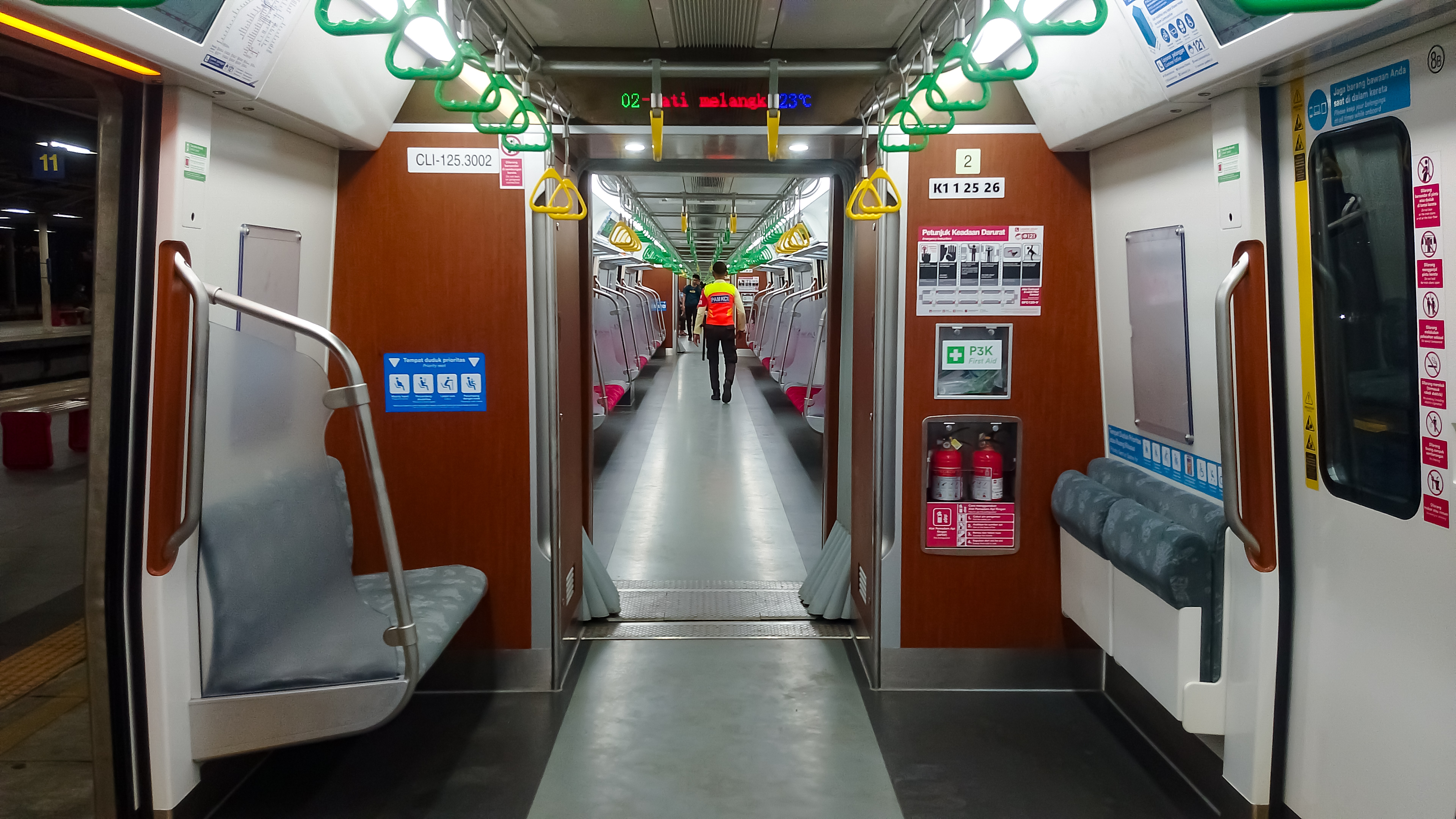
Fixed priority seat and foldable priority seat while also as a wheelchair or stroller space when the seat are folded

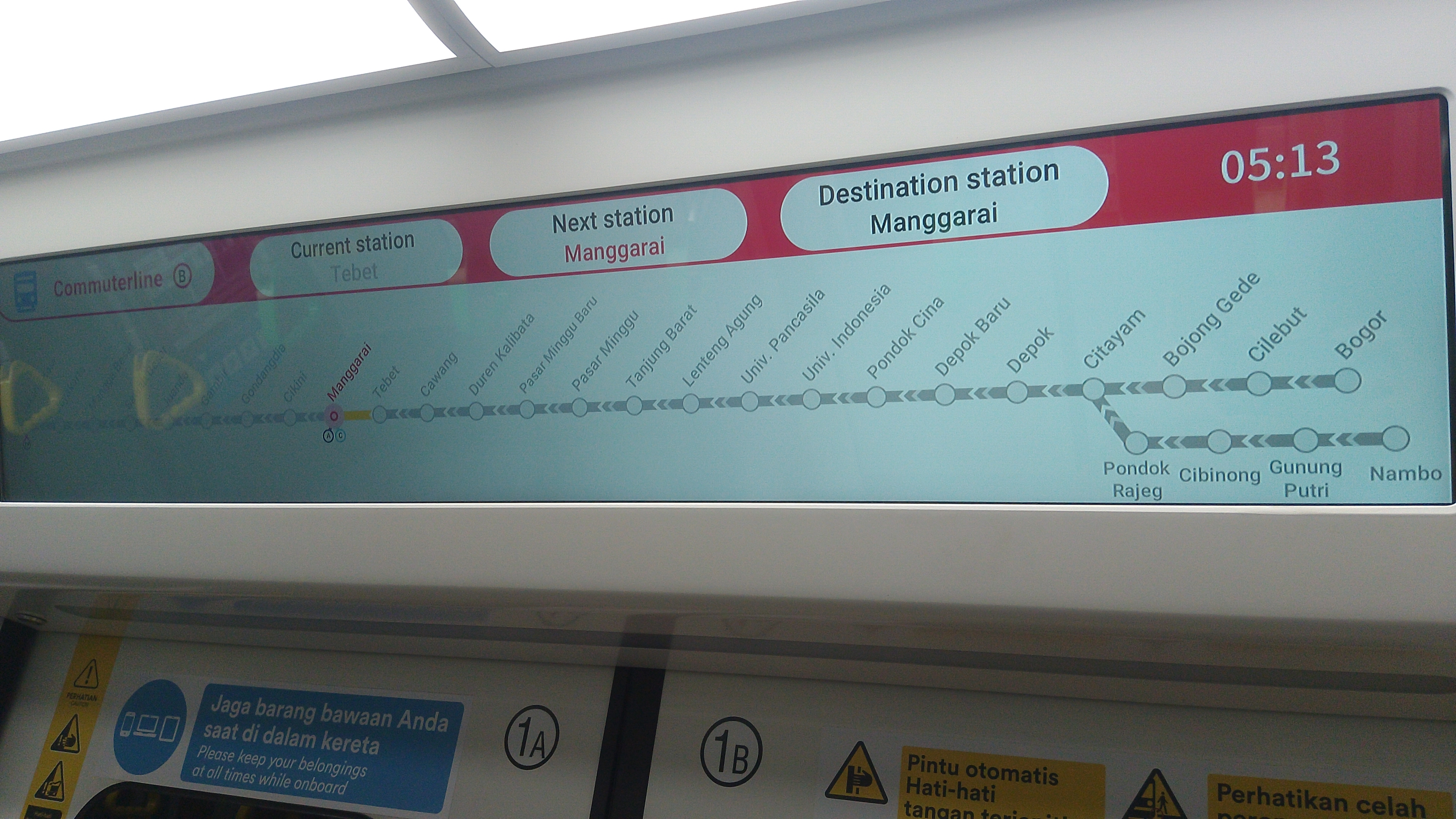
Passenger information display

== See also ==
Media related to KRL KCI-SFC120-V at Wikimedia Commons

- iE305 series
