= Rajawali–Cikampek railway =

Railway line in Indonesia

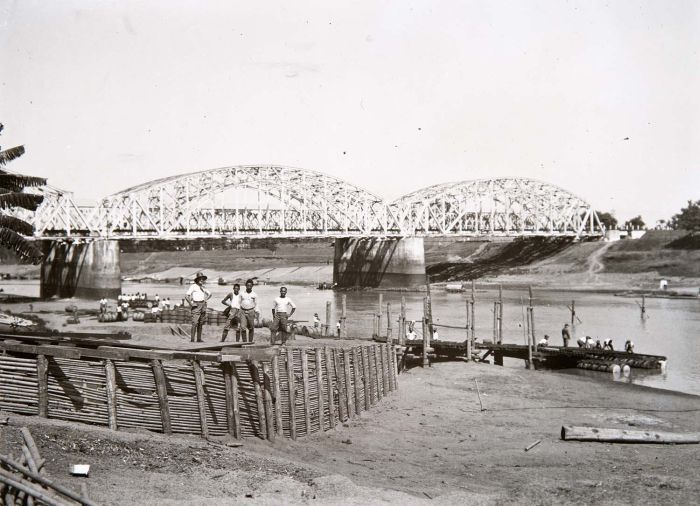
- Kedunggedeh Bridge over Citarum river.

Overview
- Native name: Jalur kereta api Rajawali–Cikampek
- Status: Operational
- Owner: Directorate General of Railways (DJKA)
- Locale: Jakarta, West Java
- Termini: Rajawali; Cikampek
- Stations: 23

Service
- Type: Commuter rail
- Operator(s): PT Kereta Api Indonesia; PT Kereta Commuter Indonesia

History
- Opened: 1898

Technical
- Number of tracks: 2
- Track gauge: 1,067 mm (3 ft 6 in)
- Electrification: 1.5 kV DC OHC

The Rajawali–Cikampek railway (Indonesian: Jalur kereta api Rajawali–Cikampek) is a railway line that connects Rajawali Station and Cikampek Station. This route crosses two provinces with 5 regencies or cities, namely Jakarta (Central Jakarta and East Jakarta) and West Java (Bekasi, Bekasi Regency and Karawang Regency). This line is one of the busiest intercity lines in Indonesia and since the 1920s it has been a double track and has been electrified since 1992.

Due to the increasing frequency of use, this line is planned to become quad-tracked, with a pair for long-distance or non-EMUs trains and a pair for Commuterline EMU's serving local stations. Eventually, this quad-track section will reach Cikarang; it had reached the Cakung-Jatinegara stretch in 14 April 2019.

There are two bridges that cross two historical rivers: Kali Bekasi (near Bekasi Station) and Citarum (near Kedunggedeh Station).

== History ==
The Jakarta–Bekasi segment came into use in 1887, Bekasi–Kedunggedeh came into use in 1888, Kedunggedeh–Karawang came into use in 1891 and Karawang–Cikampek came into use in 1906; initially as part of the Jakarta–Cikampek line, which was a continuation of the Jakarta–Bogor railway line that had opened several years earlier. During the Dutch colonial period, these routes were under the management of the Staatsspoorwegen Westerlijnen (SS-WL) from 1898 and were originally managed by Bataviasche Oosterspoorweg Maatschappij (BOS).

The double track in the Batavia–Cikampek route was initiated in the 1920s. The SS annual report of 1922 noted that the Jatinegara–Cikampek, Wonokromo–Tarik, and Padalarang–Cimindi double routes were in operation.

The improvement of the double track and electrification on this route was started in 1992, as part of the construction of the Jakarta–Cikampek and Cikampek–Cirebon double tracks. With a total cost of Rp. 500 billion per 2003, the double tracks in both routes are complete.

=== Double path construction ===
In this route, double-double tracks, also known as quadruple tracks for the Manggarai–Cikarang segment along 34 kilometers, are being built, connecting Manggarai Station to Cikarang Station, and initiated by the Directorate General of Railways. This project aims to separate the main line for long-distance trains and the KRL Commuterline, thereby eliminating delays in the KRL Commuterline and at the same time increasing the passenger capacity from 850 thousand passengers to 1.2 million passengers per day. This project was started in 2013 and is expected to be completed in 2019.

This project uses a package financing system, which is divided into package A, package B1, and package B21. Package A worth IDR 2.5 trillion using state sukuk, Package B1 worth 3 trillion comes from Japanese loans, and Package B21 of 1 trillion from the state budget.

To prepare for this project, several stations were renovated by adding new buildings. Almost all stations on this line, except for Cipinang Station and Bekasi Station, have new buildings. In addition, two special stations were built for EMUs, namely Metland Telagamurni Station and Bekasi Timur Station.
