= Angke railway station =

Railway station in Indonesia

C08 Angke station Stasiun Angke
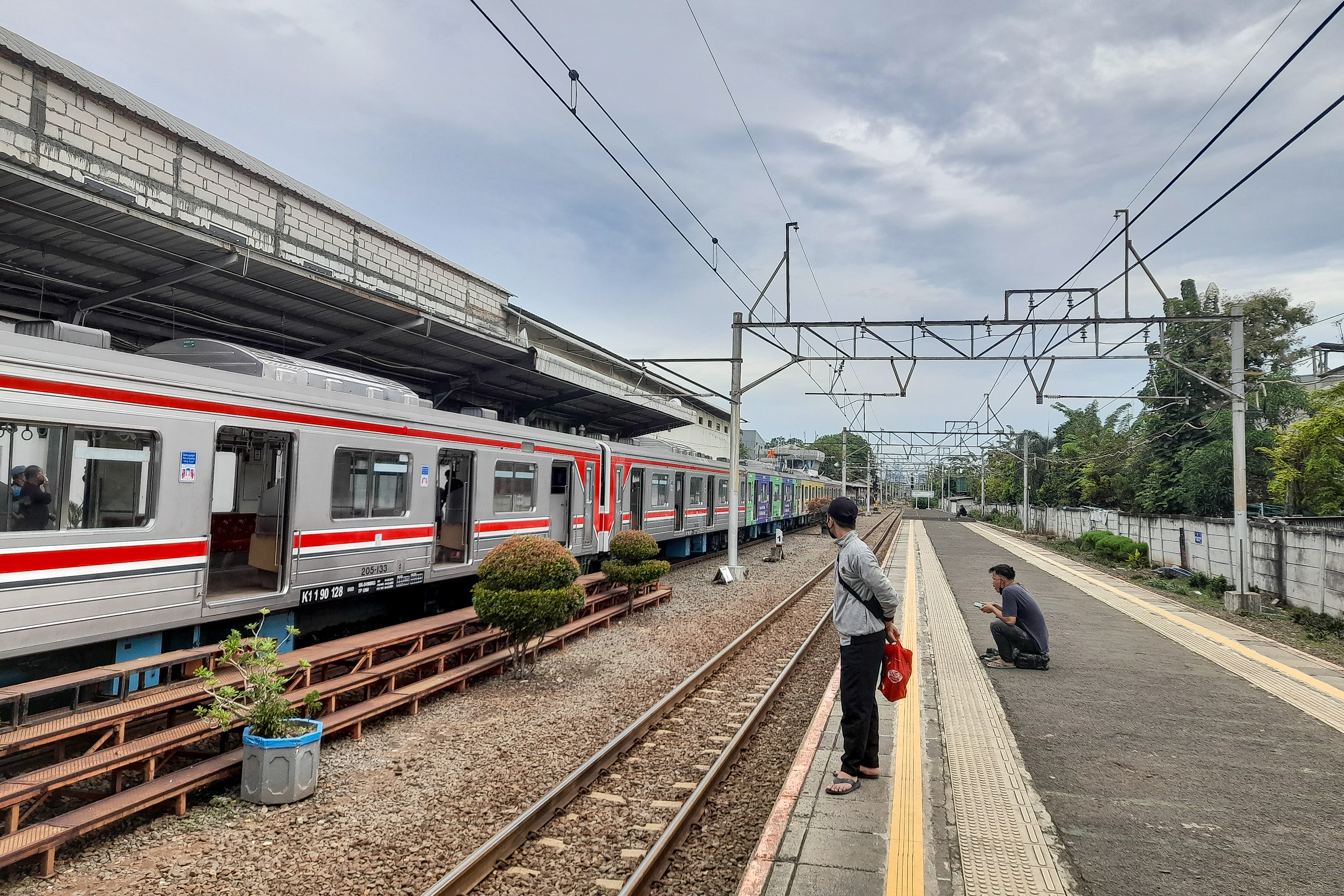
- The emplacement of the station, 2022

General information
- Location: Jalan Stasiun Angke; Angke, Tambora; West Jakarta 11330; Indonesia
- Coordinates: 6.1442937°S 106.8006706°E
- Elevation: 3 m (9.8 ft)
- System: Commuterline station
- Owner: Kereta Api Indonesia
- Operator: KAI Commuter
- Line: Cikarang Loop Line
- Platforms: Single island platform Single side platform
- Tracks: 3

Other information
- Station code: AK • 0403
- Classification: II

History
- Opened: 2 January 1899
- Electrified: 1987
- Former names: Angkee
- Original company: Staatsspoorwegen

Services
Preceding station		Following station
Kampung Bandan Terminus	Commuter Line Cikarang Terminus for half-racket services	Duri towards Bekasi or Cikarang via Manggarai
Location
- Location within Jakarta

Angke station (AK) (Indonesian: Stasiun Angke) is a railway station located in Tambora, West Jakarta, Indonesia. It is served by the Cikarang Loop Line of the KRL Commuterline. This station has three tracks with tracks 2 and 3 as the through tracks.

In early 2008, the station was cleared from hundreds of illegal huts on the land near the station.

Before February 2017, this station was used for the beginning and end of local train trips serving Banten, such as Langsam, Banten Express, and Patas Merak, while the KRL Commuterline ran without stopping at this station. For Kalimaya and Rangkas Jaya trains, the beginning and end of the trip remained from Tanah Abang Station.

Since February 2017 the station has been reactivated for KRL with Angke-Bogor, Angke-Depok, and Angke-Nambo routes. All local trains that previously serve this station were combined as Lokal Merak train and the relation was changed to Rangkasbitung–Merak.

== History ==
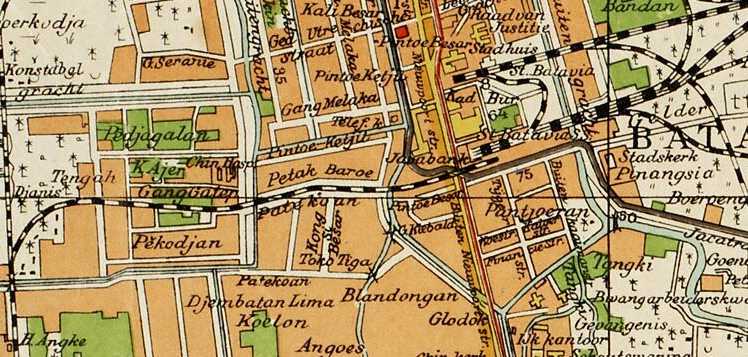
The route map between Batavia Zuid station and Angke station through the Pasar Asemka street before its deactivation

This station was inaugurated by the Staatsspoorwegen on 2 January 1899, along with the operational of the Batavia–Rangkasbitung railway.

Initially, the line from Batavia Zuid Station headed to Angke was built via Jalan Pasar Asemka. When a new route was made from Angke which made a detour through the Kota Intan and Kampung Bandan areas, the route from Batavia Zuid Station to Jalan Pasar Asemka was cut off. Then, a station was established on Jalan Pasar Asemka which was named Pasar Pagi Station, this station is used as the initial point of departure for passenger trains heading to the Tangerang Station.

The station along with this line was dismantled at one time, then its former location has become the Asemka Market and Jalan Asemka Raya overpass. There are still remainings from this route that can still be seen, namely 2 pieces of the foundation for the rail bridge from the Krukut River which is located under the Jalan Asemka Raya overpass.

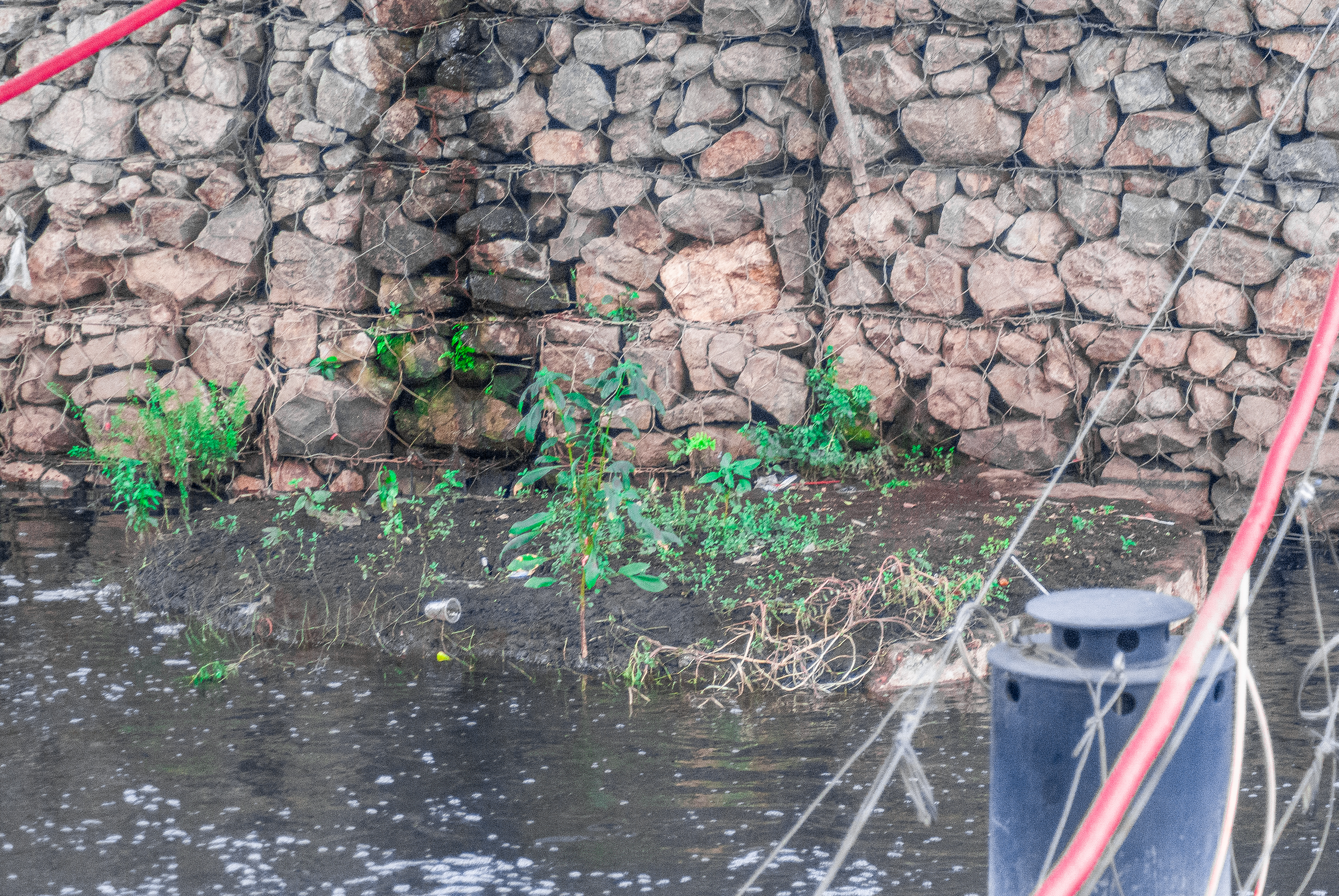
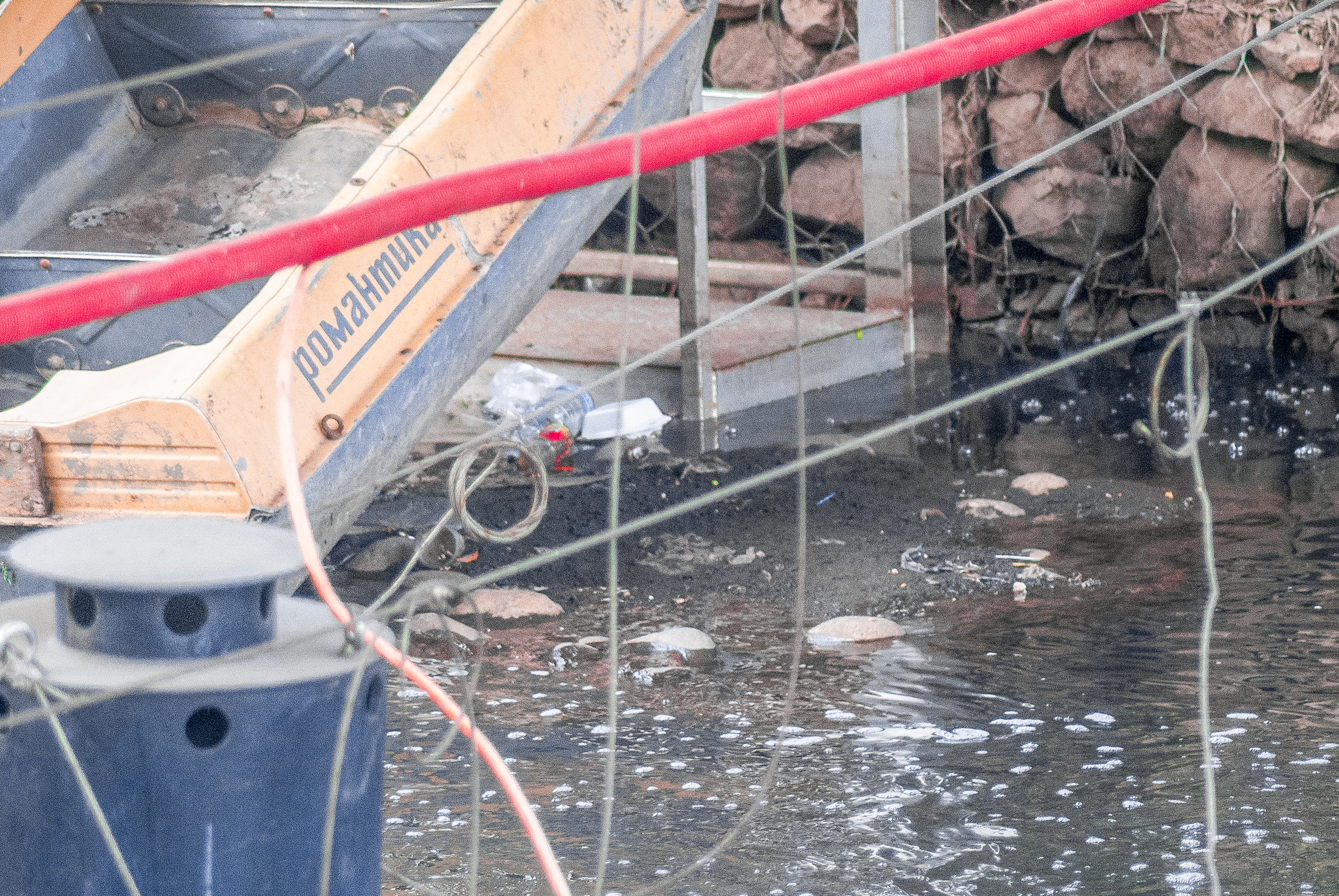
The remainings of the railway bridge foundation of the Pasar Pagi station (Asemka)

In the 1970s, the emplacement of this station was thought to have multiple lines and a branch line. At that time, lines 2 and 3 were straight tracks used for passing trains, while lines 1 and 4 were passing loop. It is also estimated that there are 2 rail siding locations that are used for storing or stabling a series of freight cars. The first save track is located next to line 4, with 2 dead ends or badug lines. And for the second track, it is in the left corner of the station emplacement from the direction of Duri Station, with 3 dead-end rails or buffer stops. This station also has 2 branch rails, the first leads to a warehouse, and the second possibly leads to a soap factory from Kampung Bandan Station. It is not yet known exactly when the branching and storage tracks at the station emplacement were dismantled, so that there are absolutely no traces left.

In 1987, the Manggarai–Kampung Bandan via Tanah Abang railway was electrified. At that time, only lines 2 and 3 were electrified at this station. Meanwhile, line 1 was not electrified for the reason of preserving the station canopy building, while line 4 was not electrified, because the line was not used for boarding and alighting passengers.

Until the late 1990s, this station using a canopy. However, this canopy only accommodates lane 1 only. This canopy was then removed and moved to Parung Panjang Station.

Currently this station only has 3 tracks, with lines 2 and 3 as straight tracks, and line 1 as turning tracks. The station building is also large in size, because the top floor of the station building is used as a market and shops.

== Station layout ==
C08
P Platform floor	Line 3	← (Duri) Cikarang Loop Line (counterclockwise loop) to Cikarang
P Platform floor	Island platform, the doors are opened on the left side
P Platform floor	Line 2	Cikarang Loop Line (clockwise loop) towards Kampung Bandan (Kampung Bandan) →
P Platform floor	Line 1	← (Duri) Cikarang Loop Line (counterclockwise loop) to Cikarang
P Platform floor	Side platform, the doors are opened on the right side
G	Main building

== Services ==
The following is a list of train services at the Angke Station.

=== Passenger services ===
- KAI Commuter
  - Cikarang Loop Line (Full Racket)
    - to Cikarang (counter-clockwise via Tanah Abang and Manggarai)
    - to Cikarang (clockwise via Kampung Bandan and Kemayoran)
  - Cikarang Loop Line (Half Racket), to Kampung Bandan and Cikarang (via Tanah Abang)

== Intermodal support ==
Public transport type	Line	Destination
MetroMini	B80	Kalideres Terminal - Jembatan Lima
Kopaja	B86	Jakarta Kota Station - Lebak Bulus Terminal
Mikrolet	M43	Grogol Terminal - Angke Station
KWK	B02	Cengkareng Timur–Jakarta Kota Station

== Places of interest ==
- An-Nawier Mosque
- Kalijodo Park

== Gallery ==
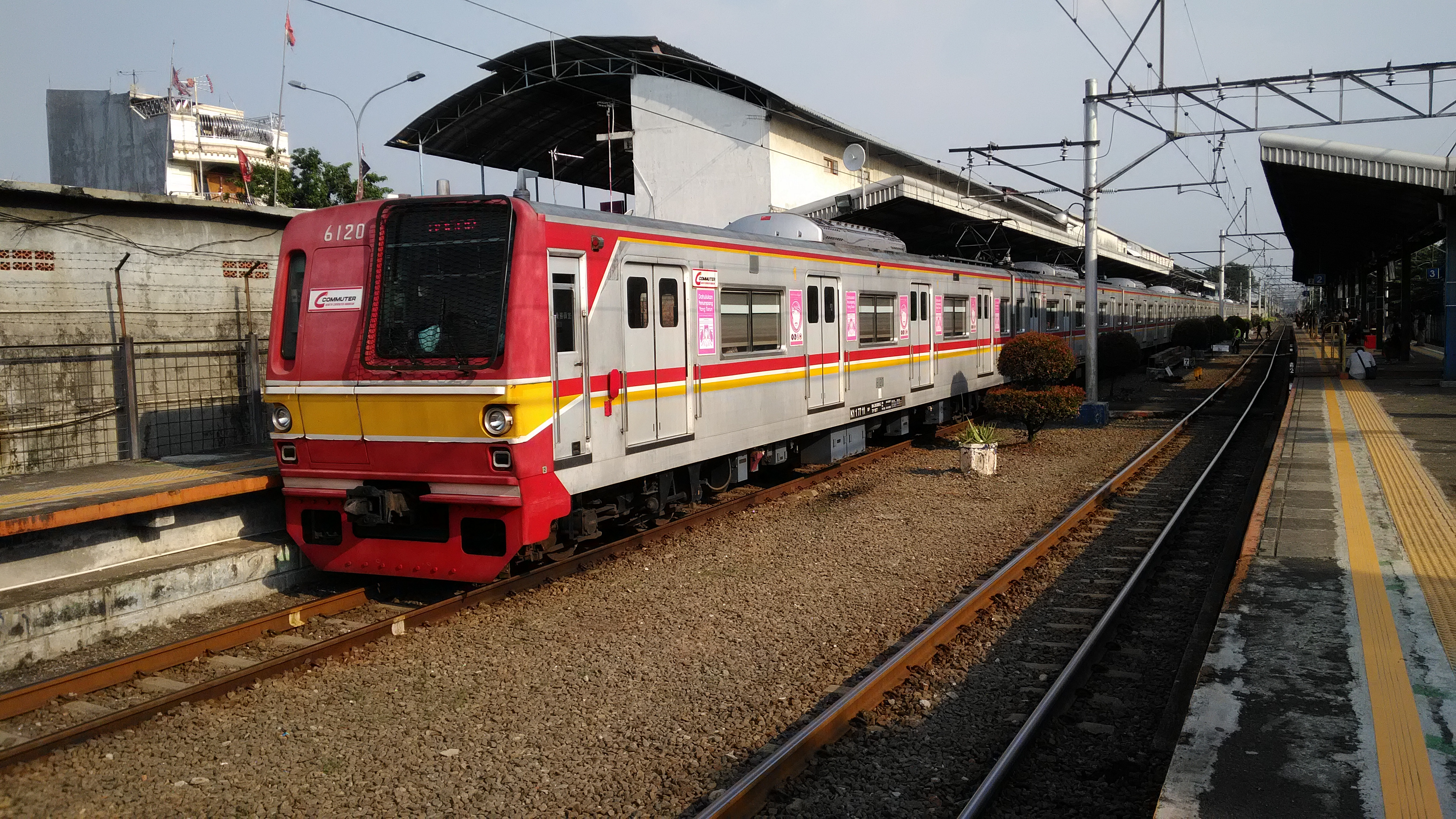
The ex-Tokyo Metro 6120F EMU arriving at the station

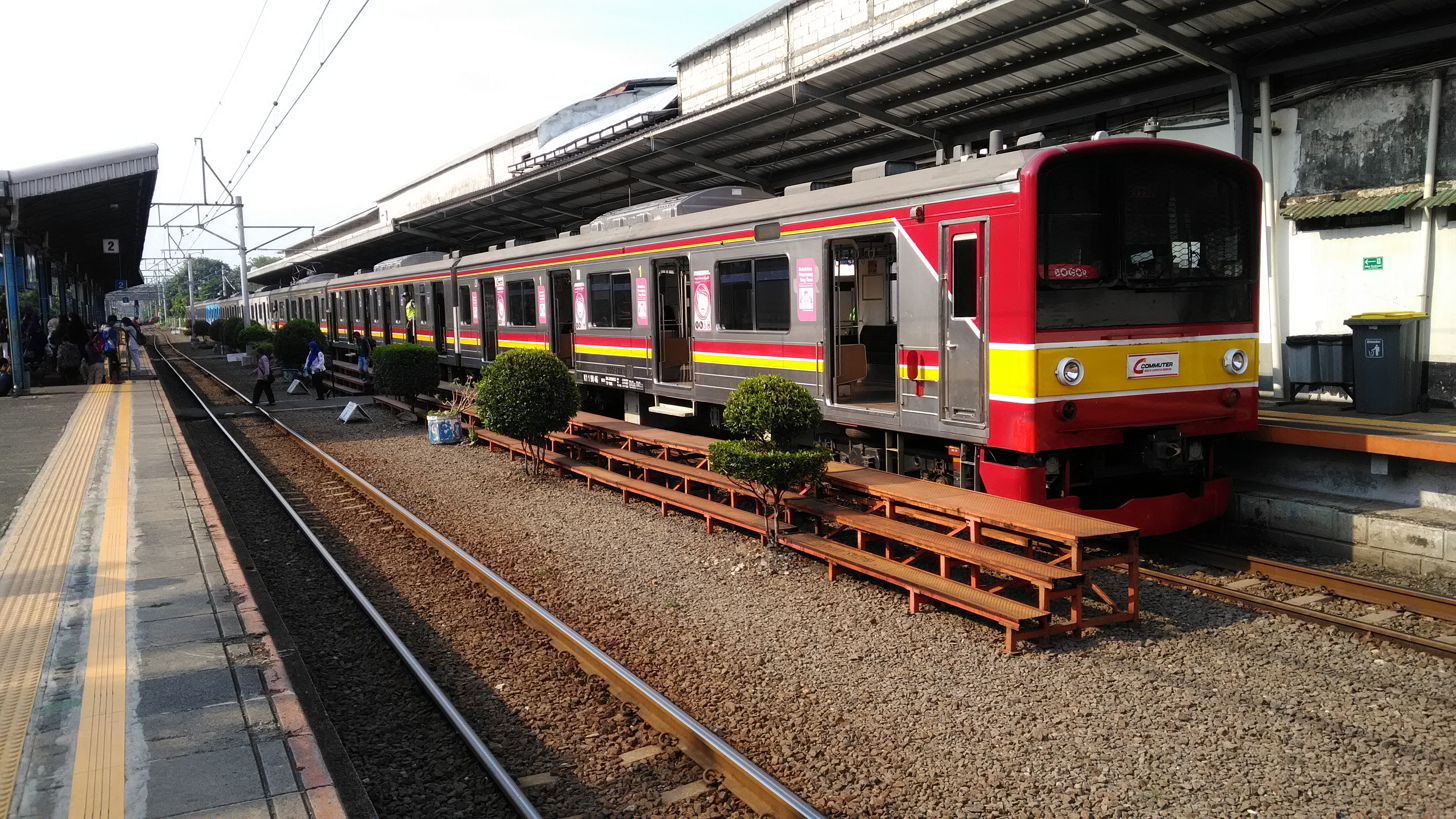
The Ex-Japan Railway 205-121F at the emplacement of the station

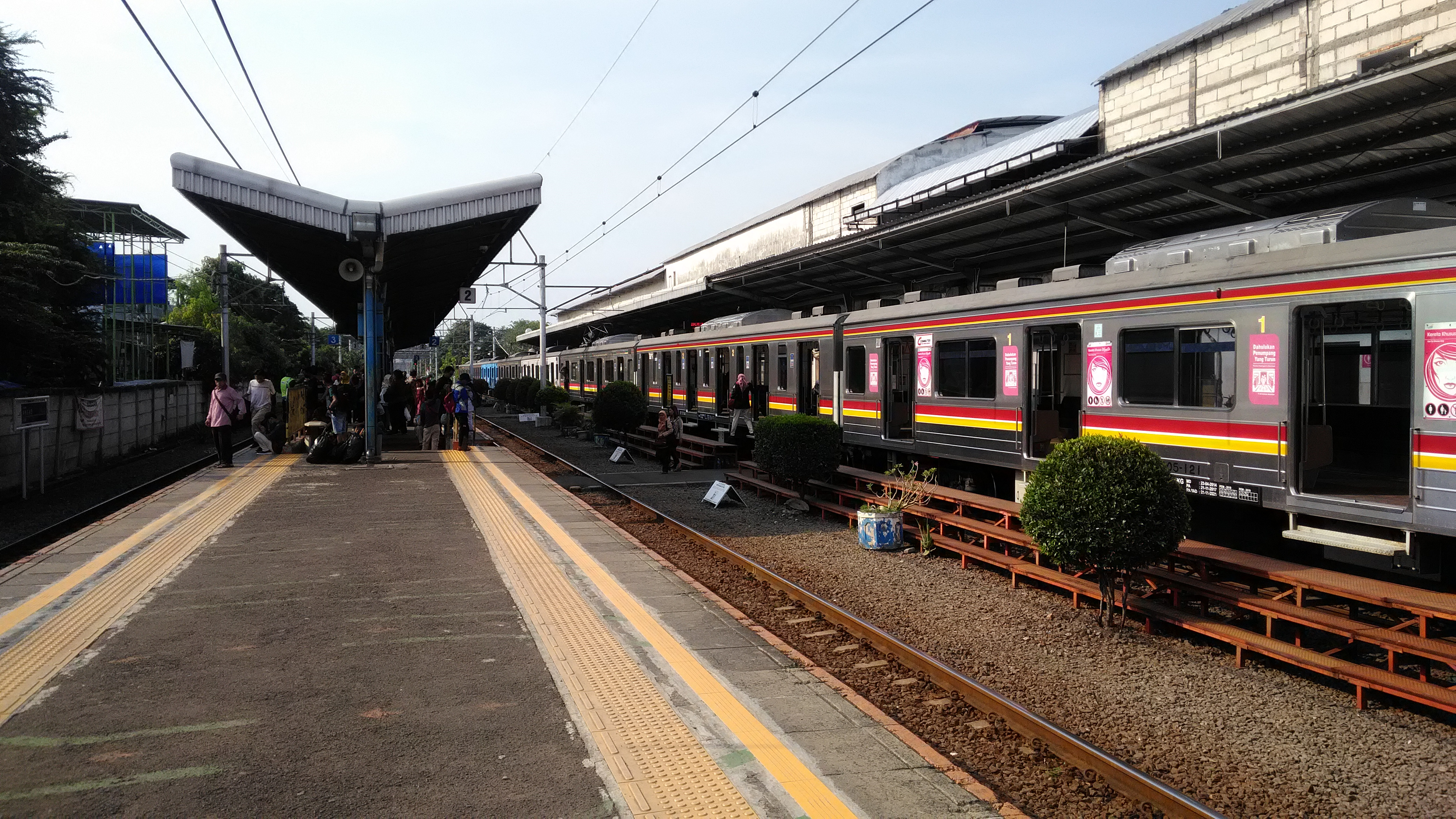
The emplacement of the station (2019)

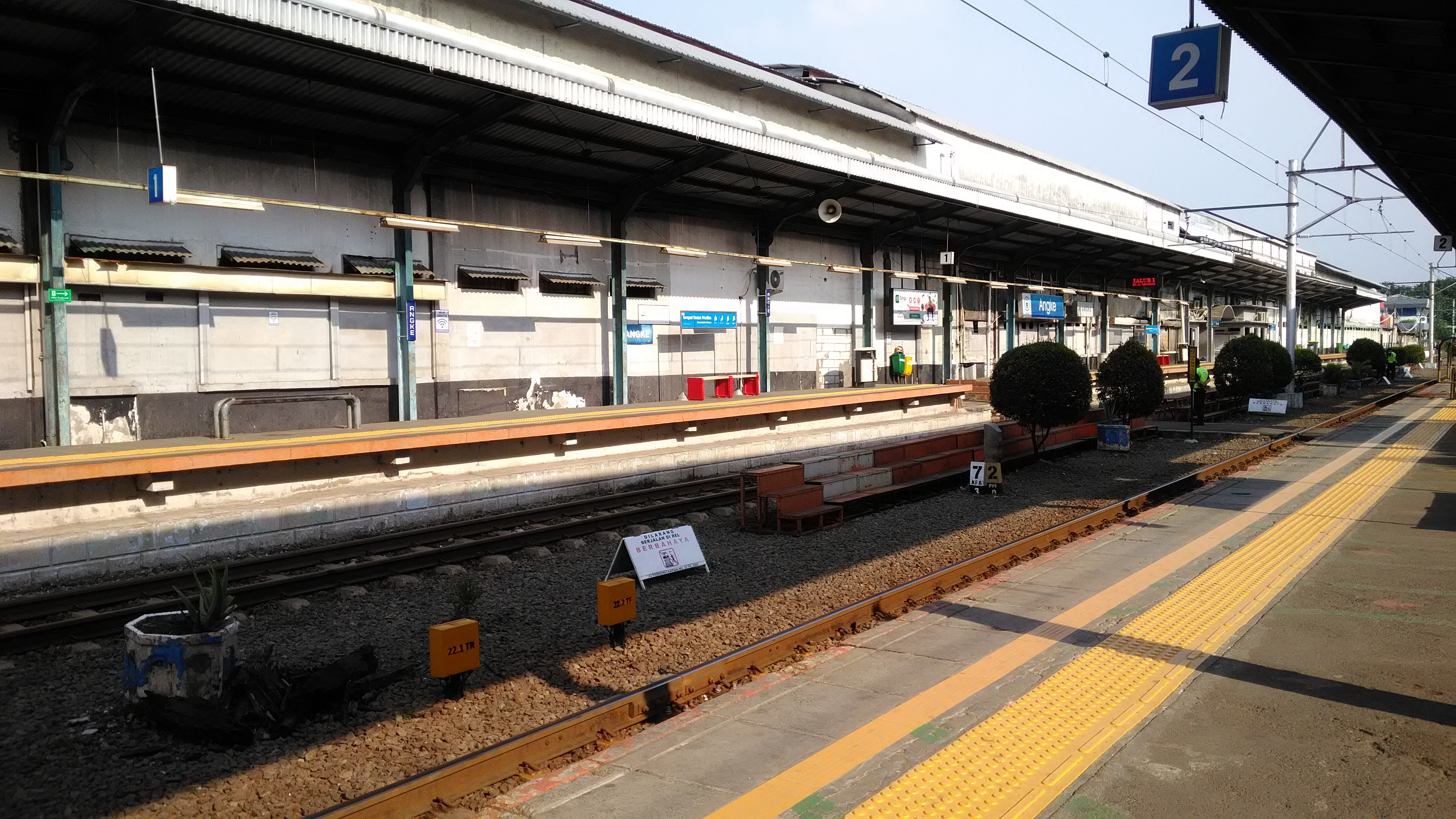
The platform of the station (2019)
