= Klari railway station =

Railway station in Indonesia

LW05 Klari Station Stasiun Klari
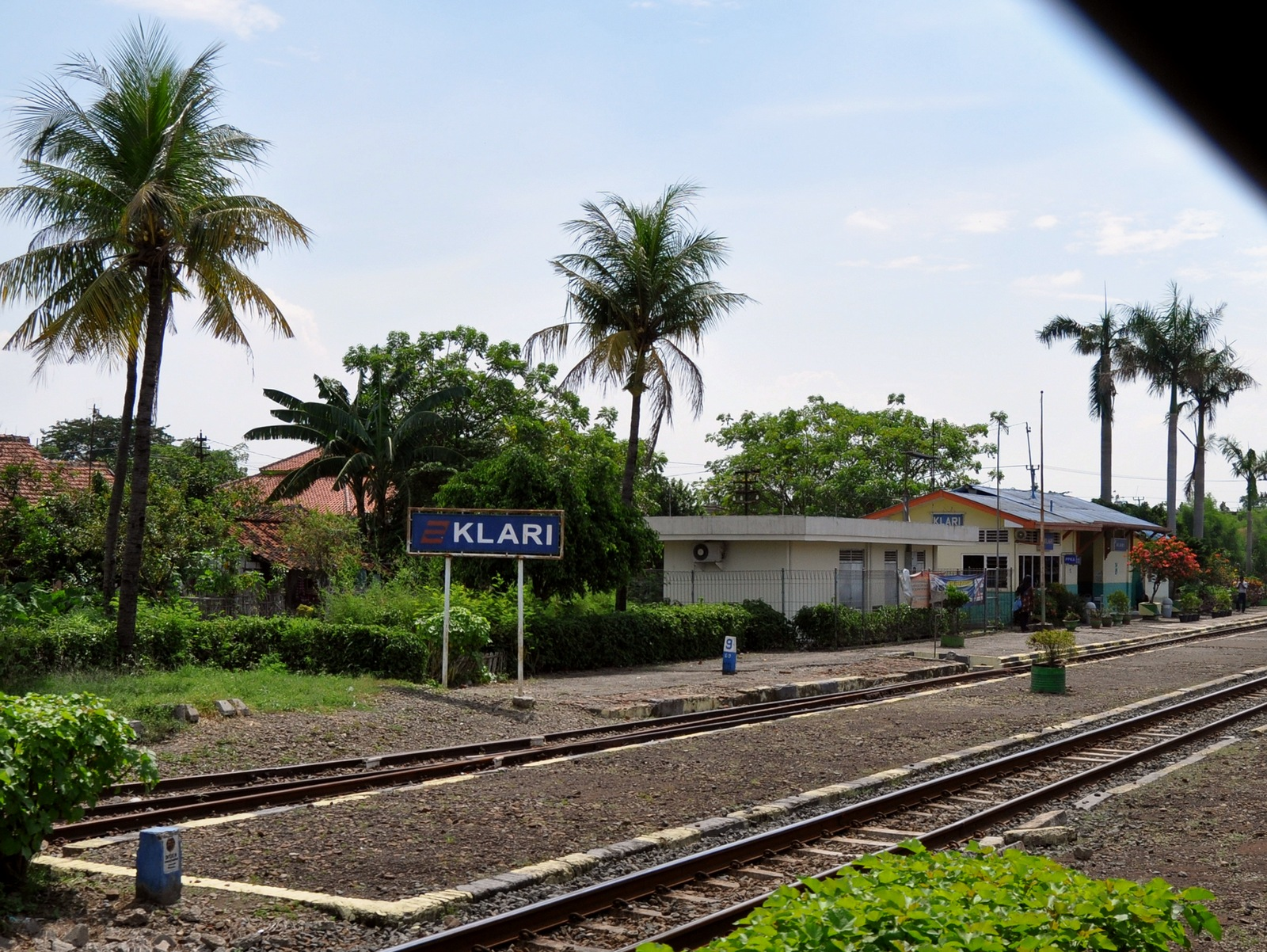
- Klari Station, photo was taken on 2 April 2012.

General information
- Location: Anggadita, Klari, Karawang Regency; West Java; Indonesia
- Coordinates: 6.35°S 107.345°E
- Elevation: +23 m (75 ft)
- Owner: Kereta Api Indonesia
- Operator: Kereta Api Indonesia
- Line: Rajawali–Cikampek
- Platforms: 1 side platform 3 island platforms
- Tracks: 4

Construction
- Structure type: Ground
- Parking: Available
- Accessible: Available

Other information
- Station code: KLI
- Classification: Class III

History
- Opened: 27 December 1902
Location
- Location within Java

Klari Station (KLI) is a class III railway station located in Anggadita, Klari, Karawang Regency, West Java, Indonesia. The station, which is located at an altitude of +23 meters, is included in the Operation Area I Jakarta.

At the station a cement warehouse was also built to serve the loading and unloading of the Bima cement train from the Kretek Station which began operating on 2 November 2015.

== Services ==
The following is a list of train services at the Klari Station.

=== Passenger services ===
- Jatiluhur Express, to Cikampek
- Walahar Express, to Cikarang and to Purwakarta

=== Freight services ===
- Bima cement (PT STAR), to Kretek

Preceding station	Kereta Api Indonesia	Following station
Karawang towards Rajawali	Rajawali–Cikampek	Kosambi towards Cikampek
