= Karawang railway station (KAI) =

Railway station in Indonesia

LW04 Karawang Station Stasiun Karawang
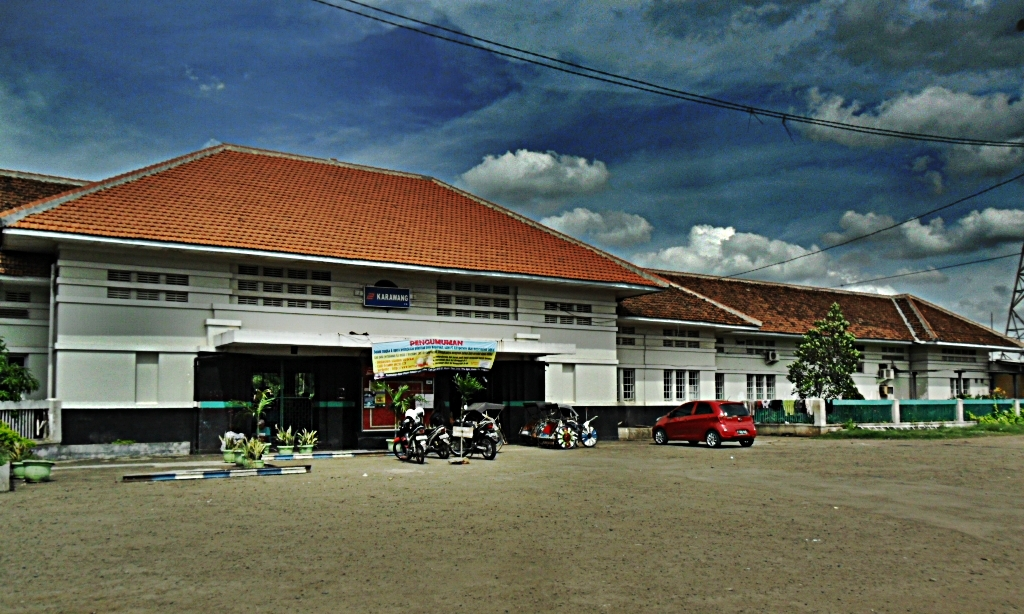
- The front view of Karawang Station

General information
- Location: Jl. Arif Rahman Hakim, Nagasari, West Karawang, Karawang Regency; West Java; Indonesia
- Coordinates: 6.3052°S 107.3002°E
- Elevation: 16 m (52 ft)
- Owner: Kereta Api Indonesia
- Operator: Kereta Api Indonesia
- Line: Rajawali–Cikampek
- Platforms: 1 side platform 3 island platforms
- Tracks: 4

Construction
- Structure type: Ground
- Parking: Available
- Accessible: Available
- Architectural style: Art Deco

Other information
- Station code: KW • 0520
- Classification: Large type C

History
- Opened: 1898; Reopened 28 October 1930
Location
- Location within Java

Karawang Station (KW) is a railway station located in Nagasari, West Karawang, Karawang Regency. The station, which is located at an altitude of 16 meters, is included in the Operation Area I Jakarta and is the station that is located in the westernmost of Karawang Regency.

At this station there is an old depot building for steam tram locomotives. To the south from the old depot (20 meters) a new depot was established close to the station emplacement. This new depot has two railway tracks connected to track 4. This new depot is not a locomotive depot, but a mechanical depot.

== History ==
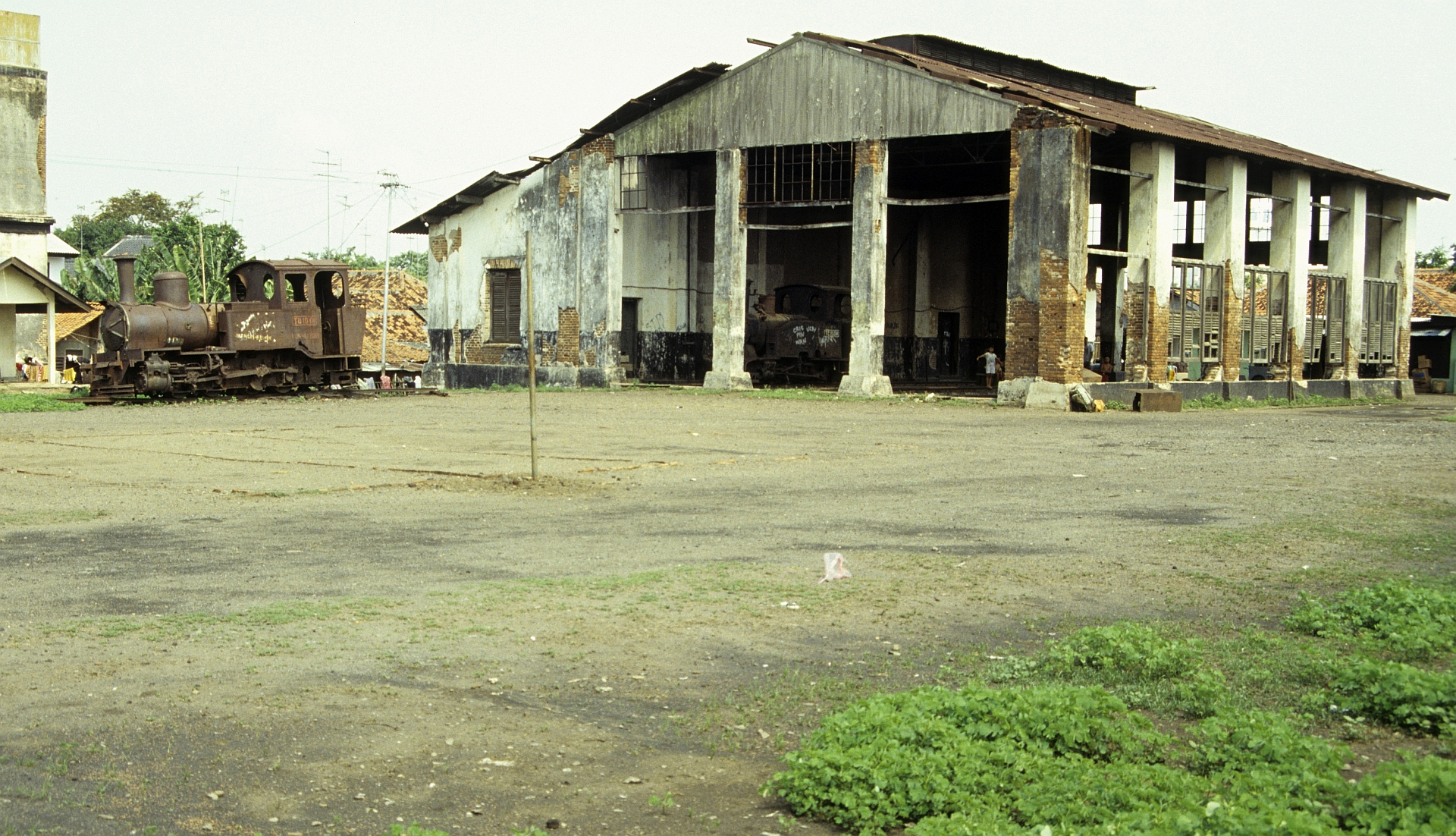
TD10 locomotive wreck on the old Karawang Locomotive Depot

Initially this station was an extension of the Jakarta–Kedunggedeh railway line which had been built by the Bataviasche Oosterspoorweg Maatschappij (BOS) in 1887, as the Kedunggedeh–Karawang segment which opened on 20 March 1898. Since that line was taken over by the Staatsspoorwegen (SS) on 4 August 1898, the SS began to expand to Cikampek and finally reached Padalarang. Its final segment, Purwakarta–Padalarang, was opened on 2 May 1906.

The development of this station is recorded by De Stoomtractie op Java en Sumatra book by J.J.G. Oegema in 1982. The Karawang tram itself was initiated in 1911 with a track width of 600 mm by SS. Although not much is discussed about this tram line, the verslag (report) made by the SS stated that this tram line was divided into two parts, namely Cikampek–Wadas, which was inaugurated on 15 July 1912 and Lamaran–Wadas, which was inaugurated on 9 February 1920. From Lamaran then made another branch tram line to Rengasdengklok on 15 June 1919. However, this line was decommissioned in 1981–1984 because it was unable to compete with private cars or road-based public transportation, as well as access to the station via an easier road without using trams anymore.

The currently operating Karawang Station is a more modern station building; built in 1930. The station building, which carries the architectural style of the 1920-30s, is bigger, wider, and has more complete facilities than the old station. The old station, located in the Dewi Sartika Shopping complex, was not used and was torn down. The station building was inaugurated on 28 October 1930.

Since December 2021, the old electrical signaling system produced by Alstom has been replaced with a new one produced by PT Len Industri.

== Building and layout ==
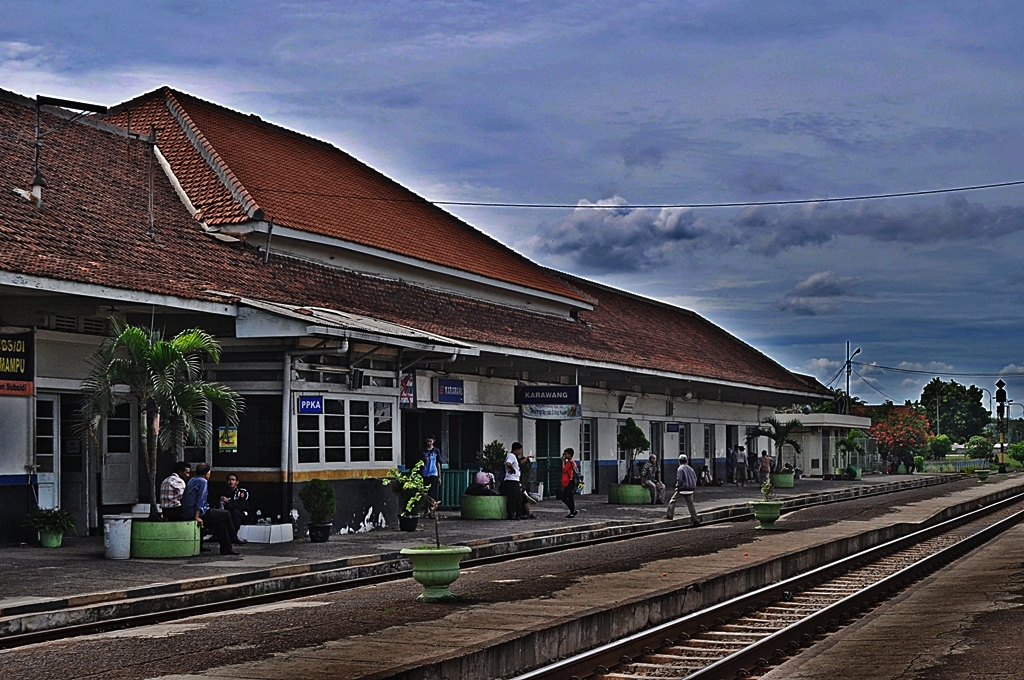
The emplacement of Karawang station seen from the east

Karawang Station has five railway lines with lines 2 and 3 being straight tracks. The architecture of the station building is in an Art Deco style, similar to the Rambipuji Station in Jember and Garut Station.

At Karawang Station there is an old depot building for steam tram locomotives. To the south of the old depot (20 meters) a new depot was built close to the station emplacement. This new depot has two rail lines connected to line 4. This new depot is not a locomotive depot, but a mechanic depot.

The hallmark of this station is the sound of Sundanese folk songs with the song "Manuk Dadali" pitched with variations of the angklung every departure and arrival of passenger trains.

In 2022, a canopy has been built at this station to cover the platforms for lines 1 to 3.

== Services ==
The following is a list of train services at the Karawang Station

=== Passenger services ===
- Mixed class
  - Jayabaya, destination of Pasar Senen and Malang (executive–economy)
  - Singasari, destination of Pasar Senen and Blitar (executive–economy)
  - Tawang Jaya, destination of Pasar Senen and Semarang Poncol (executive–economy)
- Economy class
  - Jaka Tingkir, destination of Pasar Senen and Purwosari
  - Serayu, destination of Pasar Senen and Purwokerto
- Local
  - Jatiluhur Express, destination of Cikarang and Cikampek
  - Walahar Express, destination of Cikarang and Purwakarta

== Incidents ==
- On 27 December 2019 at 15:52, the signaling device for the Karawang Station train was struck by lightning resulting in signaling disruption. As a result, a number of trains that stopped or passed directly at this station were delayed.

== Gallery ==
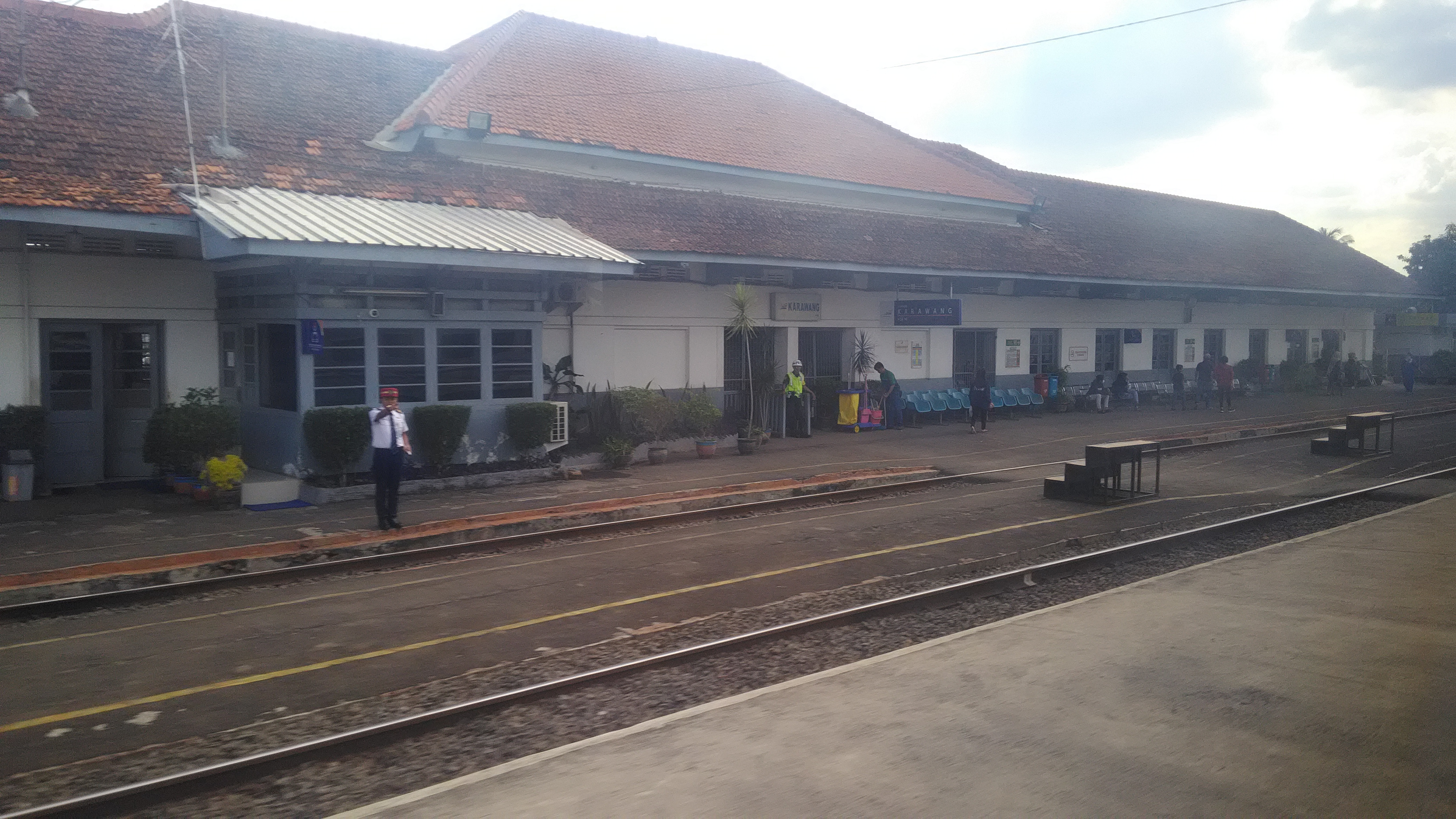
The Karawang station building seen from the Walahar Express train (2019)

Preceding station	Kereta Api Indonesia	Following station
Kedunggedeh towards Rajawali	Rajawali–Cikampek	Klari towards Cikampek
