= Lemahabang railway station =

Railway station in Indonesia

LW02 Lemahabang Station Stasiun Lemahabang
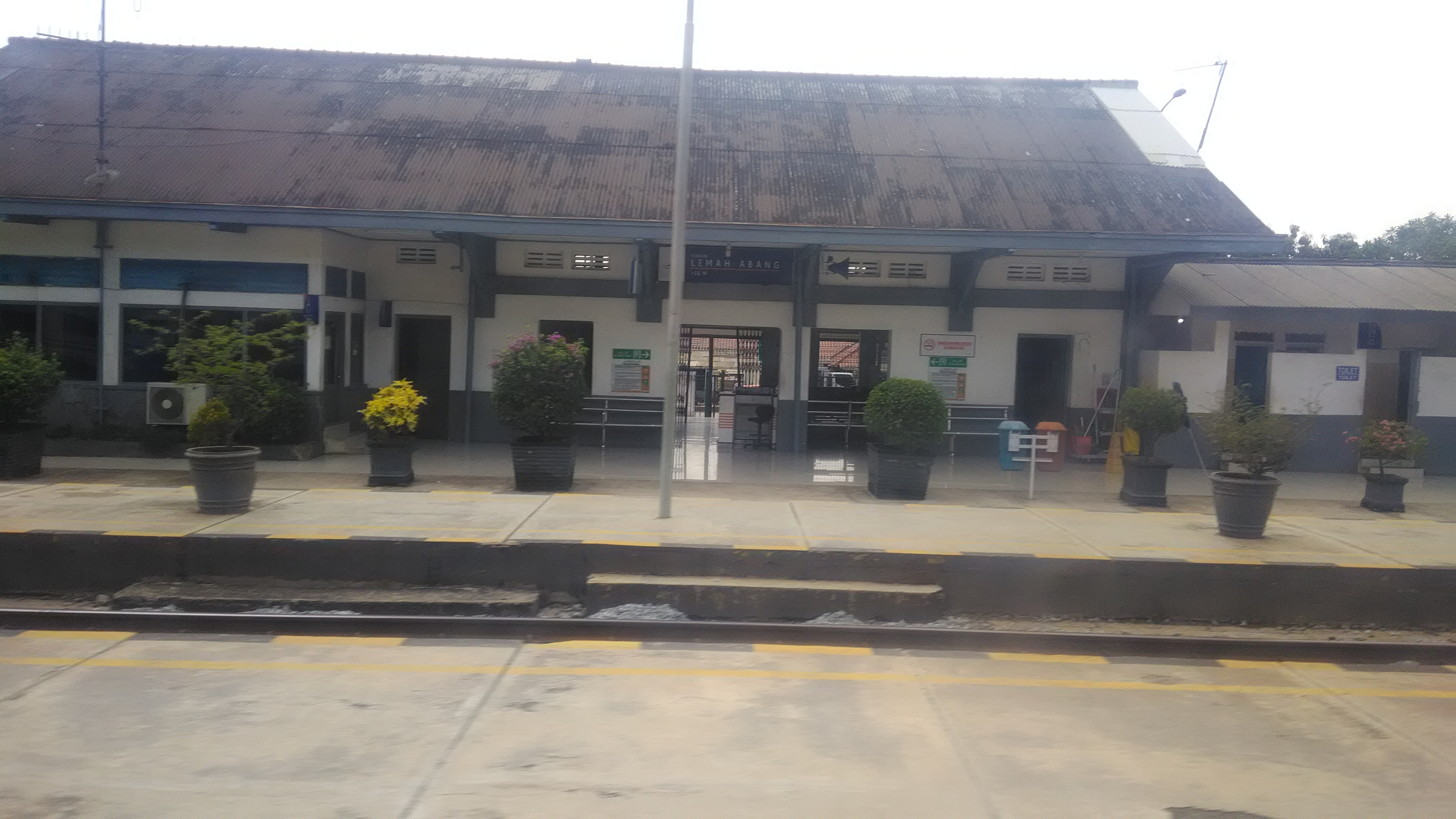
- The emplacement of Lemahabang Station, photo was taken on 4 April 2019

General information
- Location: Jl. Urip Sumohardjo, Simpangan, North Cikarang, Bekasi Regency; West Java; Indonesia
- Coordinates: 6.27056°S 107.18°E
- Elevation: +16 m (52 ft)
- Owner: Kereta Api Indonesia
- Operator: Kereta Api Indonesia; KAI Commuter
- Lines: Rajawali–Cikampek railway; LW Walahar/Jatiluhur
- Platforms: 1 side platform 3 island platforms
- Tracks: 4

Construction
- Structure type: Ground
- Parking: Available
- Accessible: Available

Other information
- Station code: LMB • 0508
- Classification: Class III

History
- Opened: 1887
- Original company: Bataviasche Oosterspoorweg Maatschappij

Key dates
- 1887: Opened and operated by Bataviasche Oosterspoorweg Maatschappij
- 1889: Take over by Staatsspoorwegen Westerlijnen

Services
| Preceding station | | Following station |
|---|---|---|
| Cikarang Terminus | Walahar | Kedunggedeh towards Purwakarta |
| Cikarang Terminus | Jatiluhur | Kedunggedeh towards Cikampek |
Location
- Location within Java

Lemahabang Station (LMB) is a class III railway stasiun located in Simpangan, North Cikarang, Bekasi Regency. The station, which is located at an altitude of +16 m, is included in the Operation Area I Jakarta. The name of this station comes from the hamlet where this station is located. This station is opposite the market and across Jl. Pantura (Pantai Utara, lit. 'North Beach').

== Building and layout ==
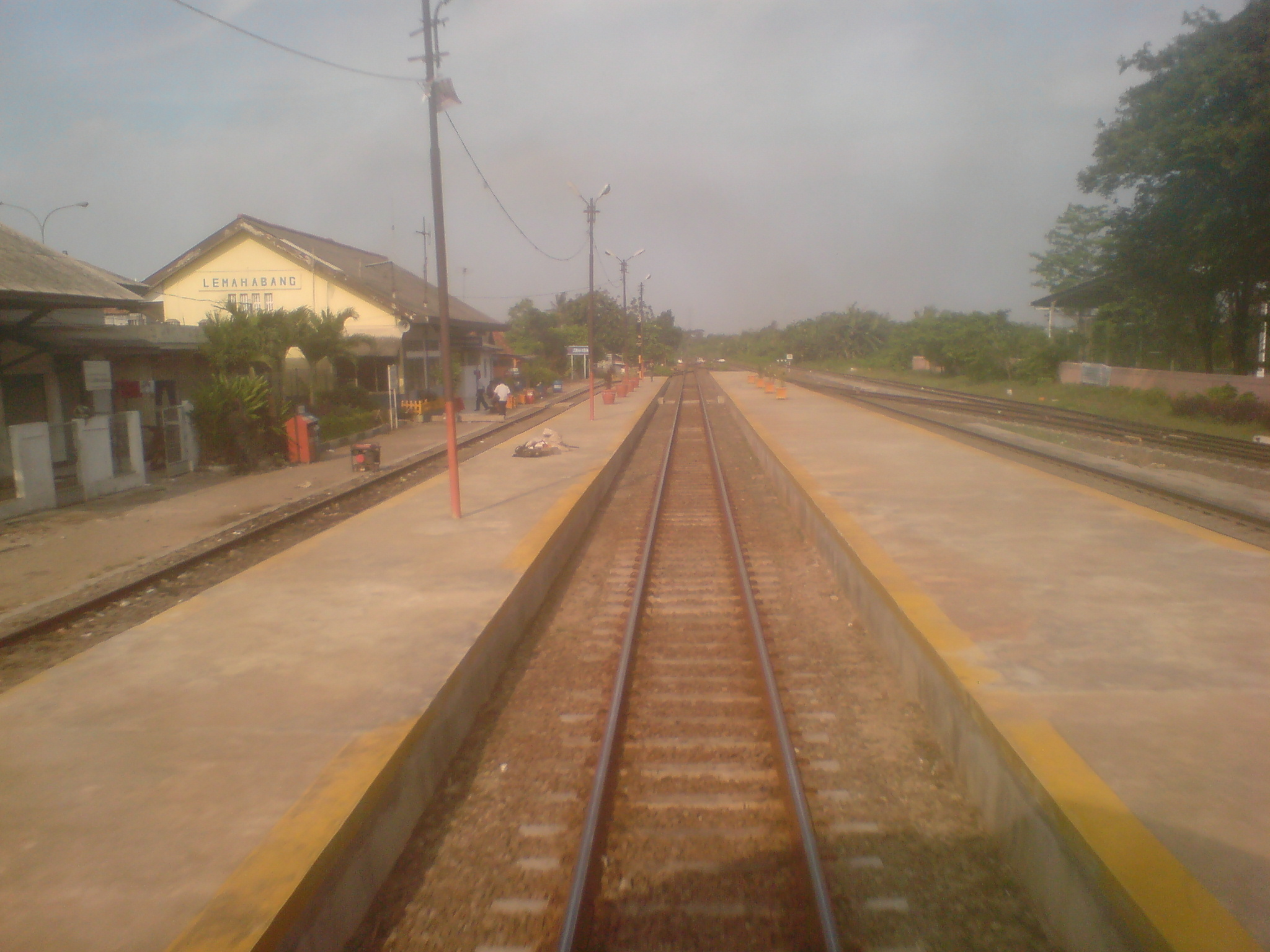
The emplacement of the station (9 May 2012)

The station has four railway lines with lines 2 and 3 being straight tracks. The length of the station's platform is only about three-quarters of the standard platform because on the west side there is a level crossing of Jalan Raya Lemahabang, similar to those at Gedangan and Cilame Stations. As a result, when a train stops, part of its chain will cover the crossing. Later on, the road located to the west will be built with an underground tunnel or overpass so that the series of trains do not block the level crossing (highway), and cut the travel time of the two transportation systems. Currently the underground tunnel project is included in the master plan of the Bekasi Regency Government.

To the west of the 4 station line there is a branch to Jababeka's Cikarang Dry Port for container transportation from Pasoso Station, Sungai Lagoa, or JICT Tanjung Priok. This train has been operating since late 2012.

Since December 2021, the old electrical signaling system produced by Alstom has been replaced with a new one produced by PT Len Industri.

== Services ==
The following is a list of train services at the Lemahabang Station.

=== Passenger services ===
- KAI Commuter

LW Walahar, to Cikarang and Purwakarta

LW Jatiluhur, to Cikarang and Cikampek

=== Freight services ===
- Container transport, to Jakarta (Sungai Lagoa, Pasoso and JICT Tanjung Priok) and to Cikarang Dry Port

| Preceding station | Kereta Api Indonesia | Following station |
|---|---|---|
| Cikarang towards Rajawali | Rajawali–Cikampek | Kedunggedeh towards Cikampek |
