= Dawuan railway station =

Railway station in Indonesia

Dawuan Station Stasiun Dawuan
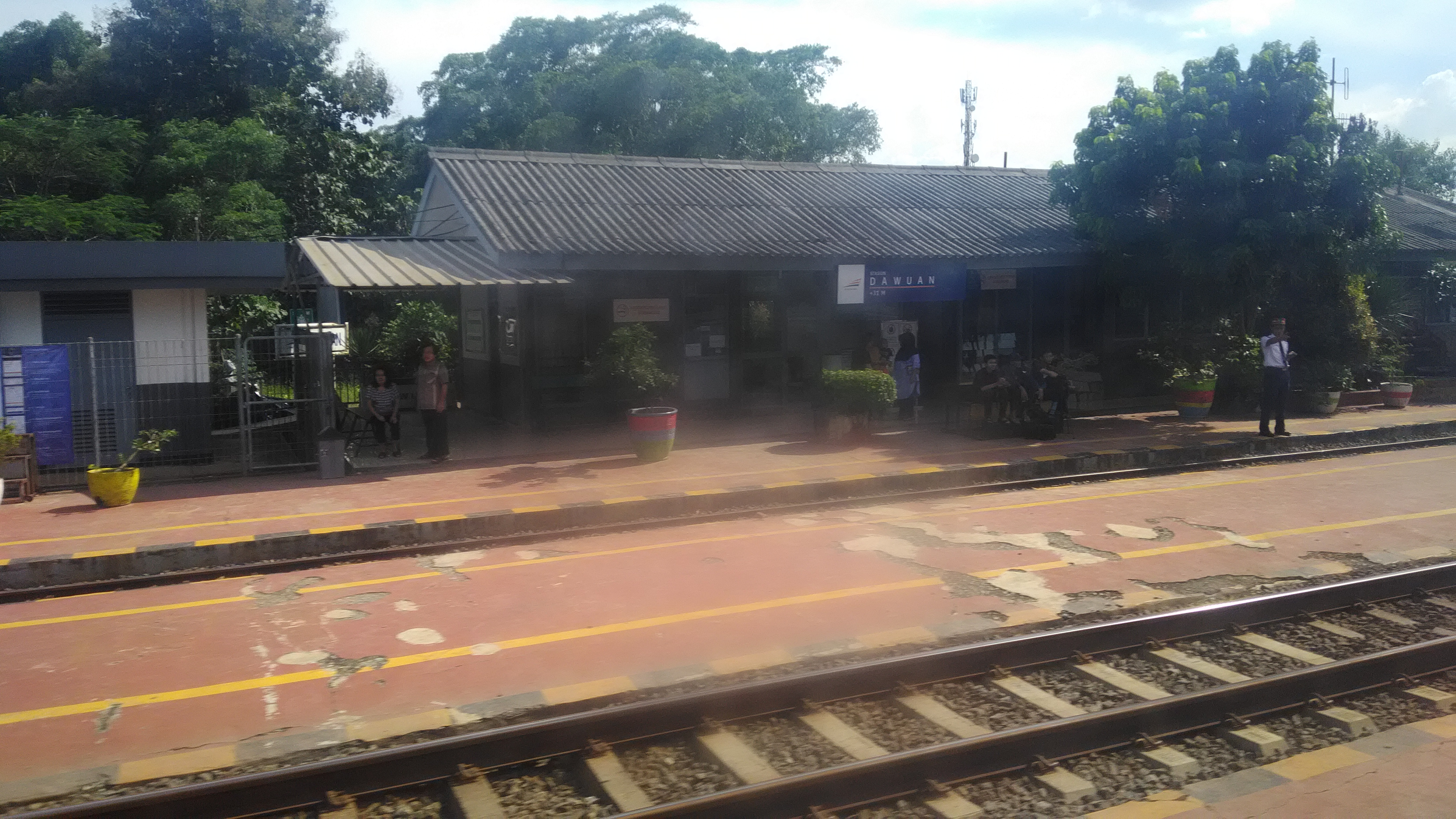
- Dawuan Station, photo was taken on 24 March 2019.

General information
- Location: Jl. Jenderal Achmad Yani, Central Dawuan, Cikampek, Karawang Regency; West Java; Indonesia
- Coordinates: 6.3932123999999995°S 107.43322140000001°E
- Elevation: +31 m (102 ft)
- Owner: Kereta Api Indonesia
- Operator: Kereta Api Indonesia
- Line: Rajawali–Cikampek
- Platforms: 1 side platform 3 island platforms
- Tracks: 4

Construction
- Structure type: Ground
- Parking: Available
- Accessible: Available

Other information
- Station code: DWN
- Classification: Class III

History
- Opened: 27 December 1902; 123 years ago
Location
- Location within Java

Dawuan Station (DWN) is a class III railway station located in Central Dawuan, Cikampek, Karawang Regency, Indonesia. The station, which is located at an altitude of +31 meters (102 ft), is included in the Operation Area I Jakarta.

From the station there is a branch line to one of the industrial areas of PT Pupuk Kujang, but the lane is no longer active.

== Services ==
The following is a list of train services at the Dawuan Station.

=== Passenger services ===
- Jatiluhur Express (Lokal Cikampek), to Cikarang and to Cikampek
- Walahar Express (Lokal Purwakarta), to Cikarang and to Purwakarta

Preceding station	Kereta Api Indonesia	Following station
Kosambi towards Rajawali	Rajawali–Cikampek	Cikampek; Terminus
