= Jatiluhur and Walahar Commuter Line =

Commuter rail system in Cikarang, Cikampek, and Purwakarta, Indonesia

Jatiluhur Commuter Line Walahar Commuter Line Cikarang - Cikampek - Purwakarta Line
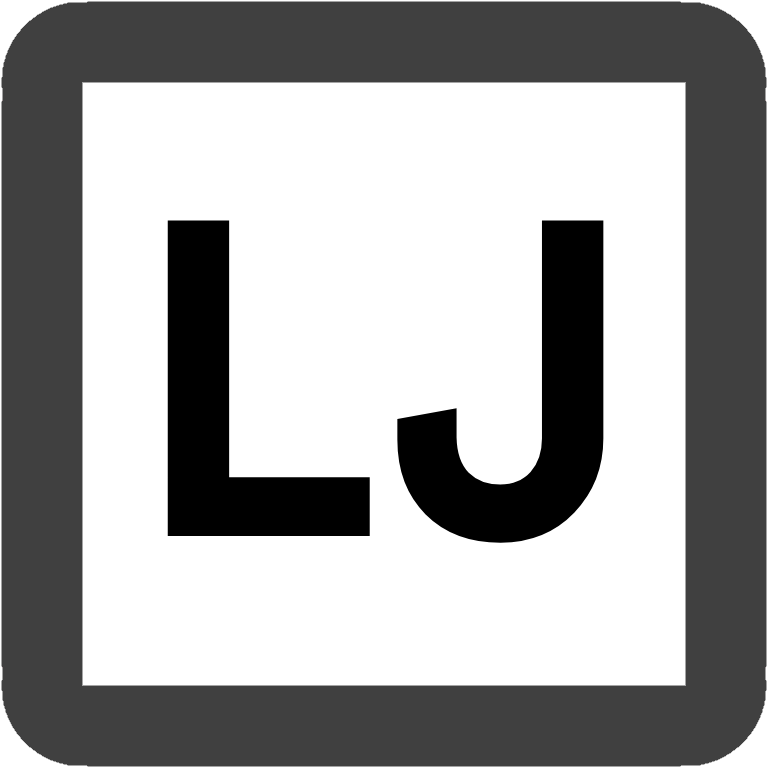
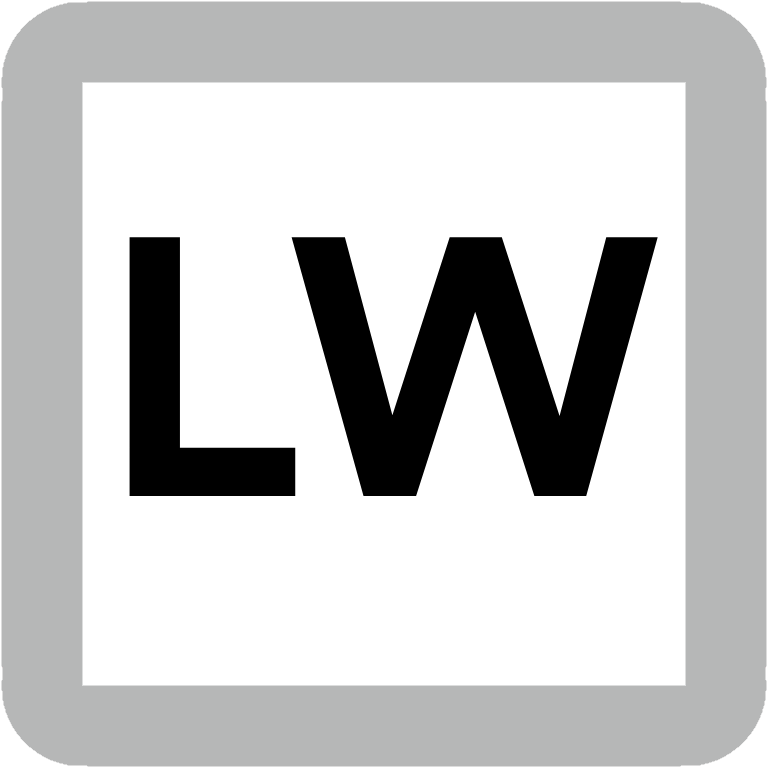
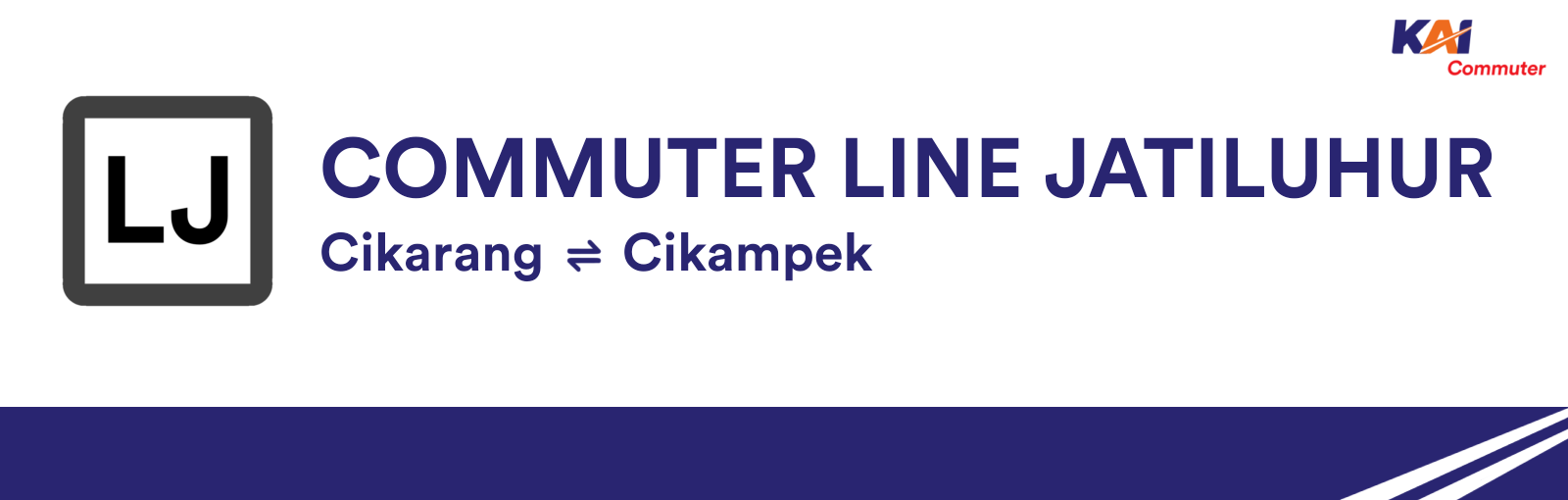
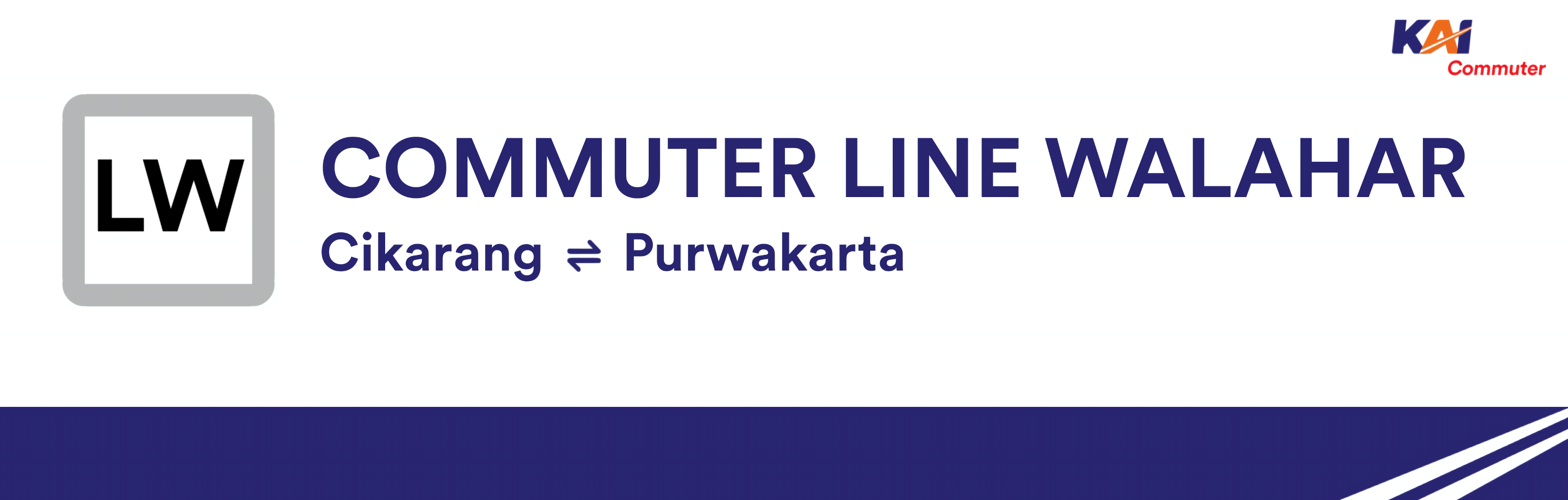

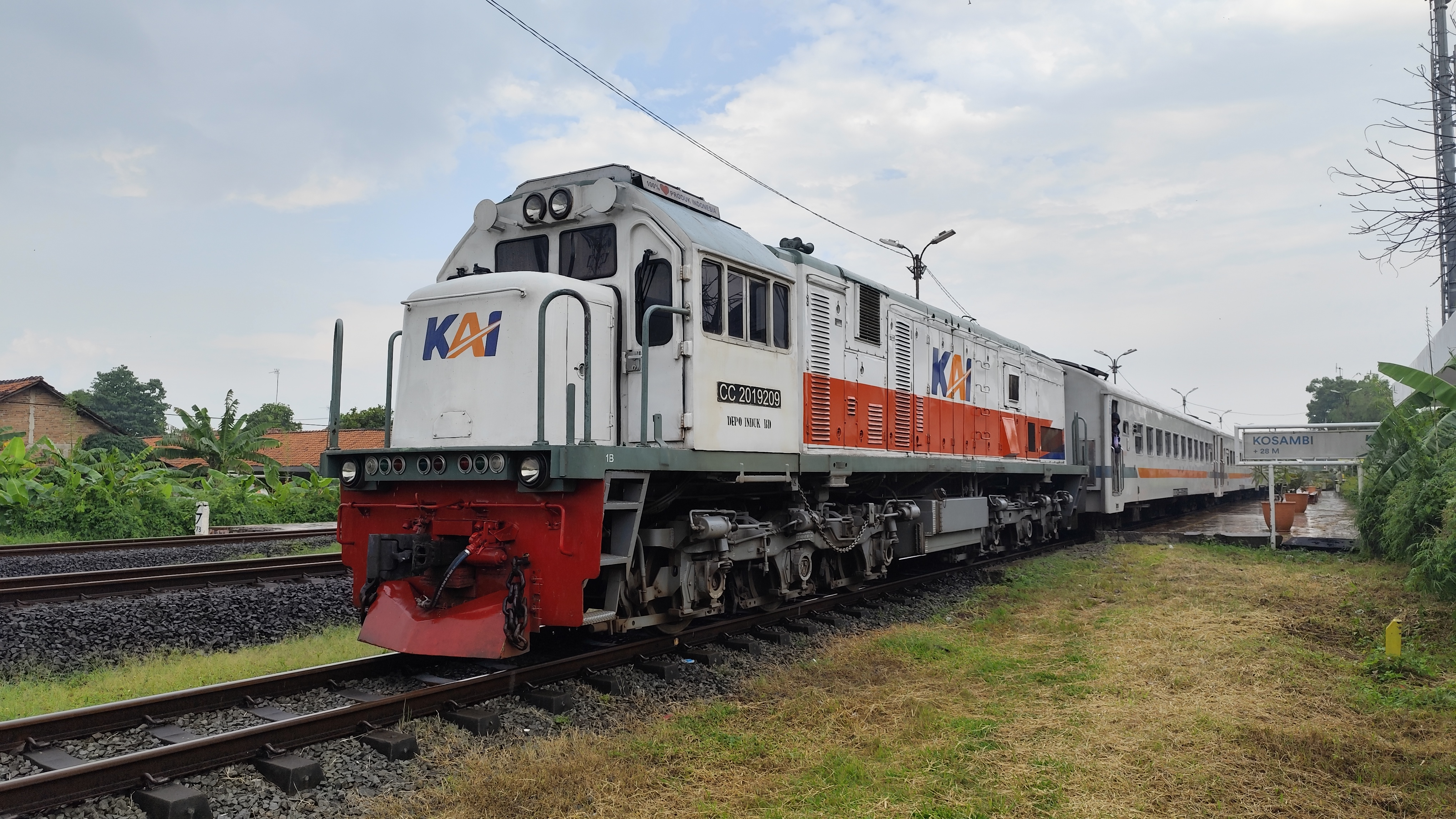
- Walahar Commuter Line stand by in Kosambi, 2024

Overview
- Service type: Commuter rail
- Status: Operational
- Predecessor: Cilamaya; Patas Purwakarta; Purwakarta Local; Cikampek Local
- First service: 1 January 2021
- Current operator: KAI Commuter

Route
- Termini: Garut; Purwakarta (Walahar) and Cikampek (Jatiluhur)
- Distance travelled: 60 km (31 mil) (Walahar); 41 km (25 mil) (Jatiluhur)
- Train numbers: 325-334 (Walahar); 335-338 (Watiluhur)

Technical
- Rolling stock: CC203; CC201
- Track gauge: 1,067 mm (3 ft 6 in)
- Operating speed: 50–90 km/h (31-55 mph)

Jatiluhur and Walahar Commuter Line are the Indonesian commuter rail line operated by KAI Commuter, consisting of Jatiluhur and Walahar. Jatiluhur trains travel between Cikarang & Cikampek, while Walahar trains move between Cikarang & Purwakarta.

== History ==
The Jatiluhur and Walahar Commuter Line can connect to Jakarta using commuter line Cikarang and to Bandung to Garut using Garut Commuter Line. On 1 January 2021, the Walahar and Jatiluhur Commuter Line started routes that previously served the Purwakarta or Cikampek route to Tanjung Priok.

Beginning on 1 April 2022, the Walahar and Jatiluhur commuter line, then managed by PT Kereta Api Indonesia, were transferred to KAI Commuter.

On 1 June 2023, following the enactment of train travel chart 2023, both services changed their name from local trains to commuter lines along with schedule adjustments.

=== Walahar ===
The name Walahar is taken from the name of the dam located in Walahar, Klari, Karawang, West Java.

Previously, train service between Jakarta Kota & Purwakarta was called Lokal Purwakarta and Patas Purwakarta which first operated in the early 1970s under Indonesian Railway Company (PJKA). Initially, the train used diesel locomotizes which were replaced by diesel-electric locomotives. In 2017, these trains were renamed Walahar Express and Cilamaya Express. However, in Gapeka 2019, the Cilamaya Express journey merged into Walahar Express.

=== Jatiluhur Commuter Line ===
This train was once known as the Cikampek Local for the Cikampek–Jakarta Kota service. In 2017, the train was renamed Jatiluhur Express, and the journey, which previously ended in Jakarta Kota, was moved to Tanjung Priuk Station after optimization by PT Kereta Api Indonesia (PT KAI) for commuter line (KRL Commuter Line) services in Jakarta Kota. The train runs alongside the Walahar Express for the extension to Purwakarta Station.

The name Jatiluhur is taken from the name of the reservoir located in Jatiluhur, Purwakarta, Purwakarta Regency, West Java.

== Station list ==
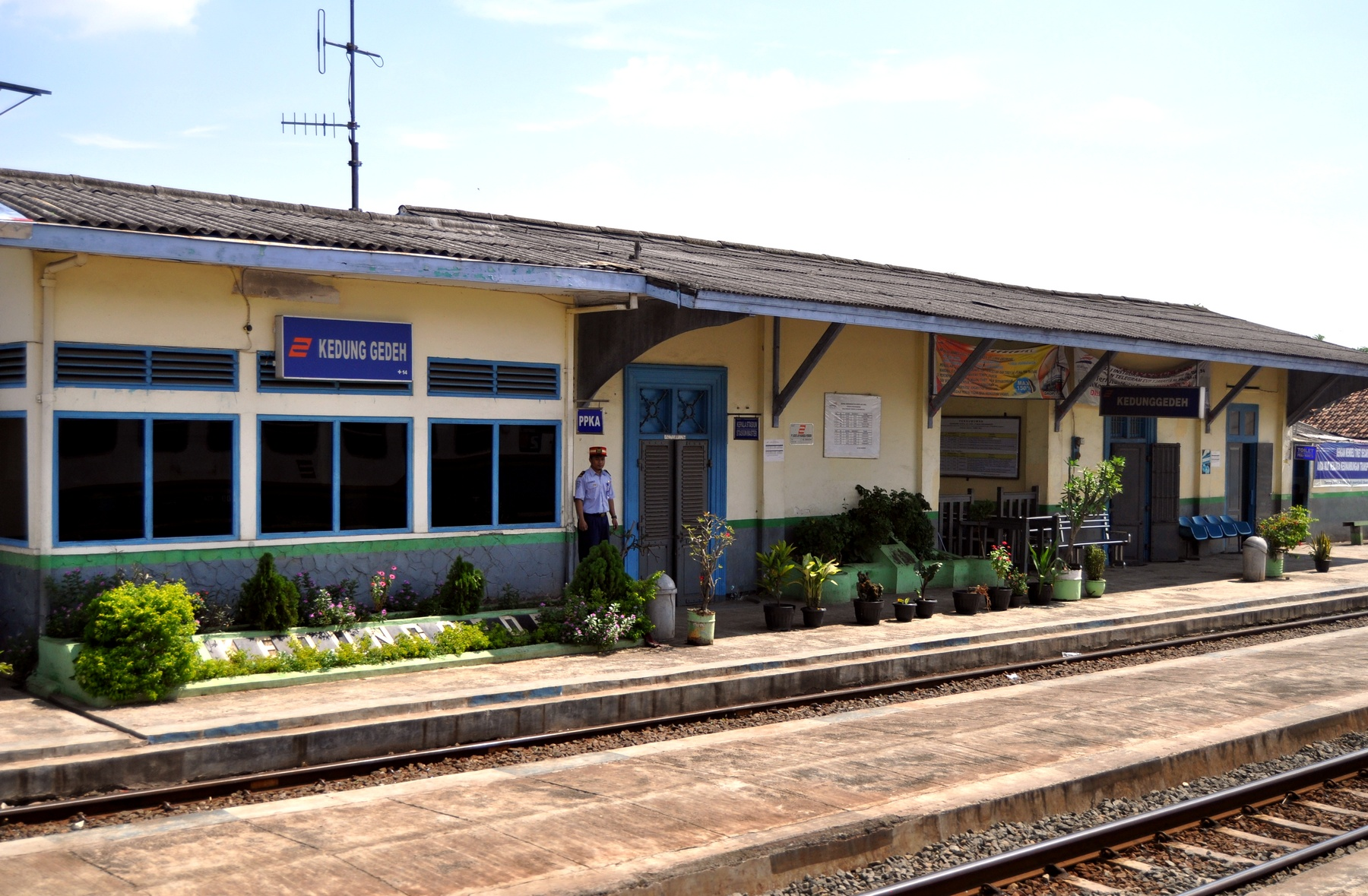
Kedunggedeh station in 2012

On 1 February 2025 the train travel chart 2025 showed the Jatiluhur and Walahar Commuter Line served by KAI for from Jakarta to Bandung as the alternate train.

- Cikarang (Start/End)
- Lemah Abang
- Kedunggedeh (KDH): a class III railway station located in Bojongsari, Kedungwaringin, Bekasi Regency also is the easternmost railway station in Bekasi Regency and Jabodetabek. The station has four railway tracks, with tracks 2 and 3 being straight tracks. To the east of this station is the Citarum River. Previously, between this station and Lemah Abang there was Rengasbandung station, which is no longer operational. In December 2021, the old electrical signaling system produced by Alstom has been replaced with a new one produced by PT Len Industri. Kedunggedeh Station was formerly the eastern terminus of the railway line owned by Bataviasche Oosterspoorweg Maatschappij (BOS), before the company continued construction until it reached Karawang in 1898. On 3 November 3 2009 at 22:30, the Argo Bromo Anggrek broke down at Kedunggedeh Station. As a result, hundreds of passengers were stranded for 2 hours. On 25 October 2025, the Purwojaya train (58F) derailed at km 56 of the Kedunggedeh station with 2 train sets are the executive 8 and 1 generator train causing some train were delayed. Also the passenger train and crew were no fatalities.
- Karawang
- Klari
- Kosambi
- Dawuan
- Cikampek (Jatiluhur Commuter Line's End)
- Cibungur
- Purwakarta (Walahar Commuter Line's End)

== Incidents ==
- On 13 June 2017, the Walahar Express train crashed into a pickup truck at the Pasar Gaplok level crossing, Senen, Central Jakarta, causing the truck to catch fire. This resulted in the deaths of two car passengers and the burning of one train.
- On 15 September 2024, the last carriage of the Walahar Commuter Line derailed after passing a crossing in Sadang, Purwakarta Regency, West Java. No fatalities ensued, but the derailment left the Purwakarta-Cibungur section open to only one lane.

== See also ==
- Greater Bandung Commuter Line
- Garut Commuter Line
