= Cikarang railway station =

Railway station in Indonesia

C26 LW01 Cikarang Station Stasiun Cikarang
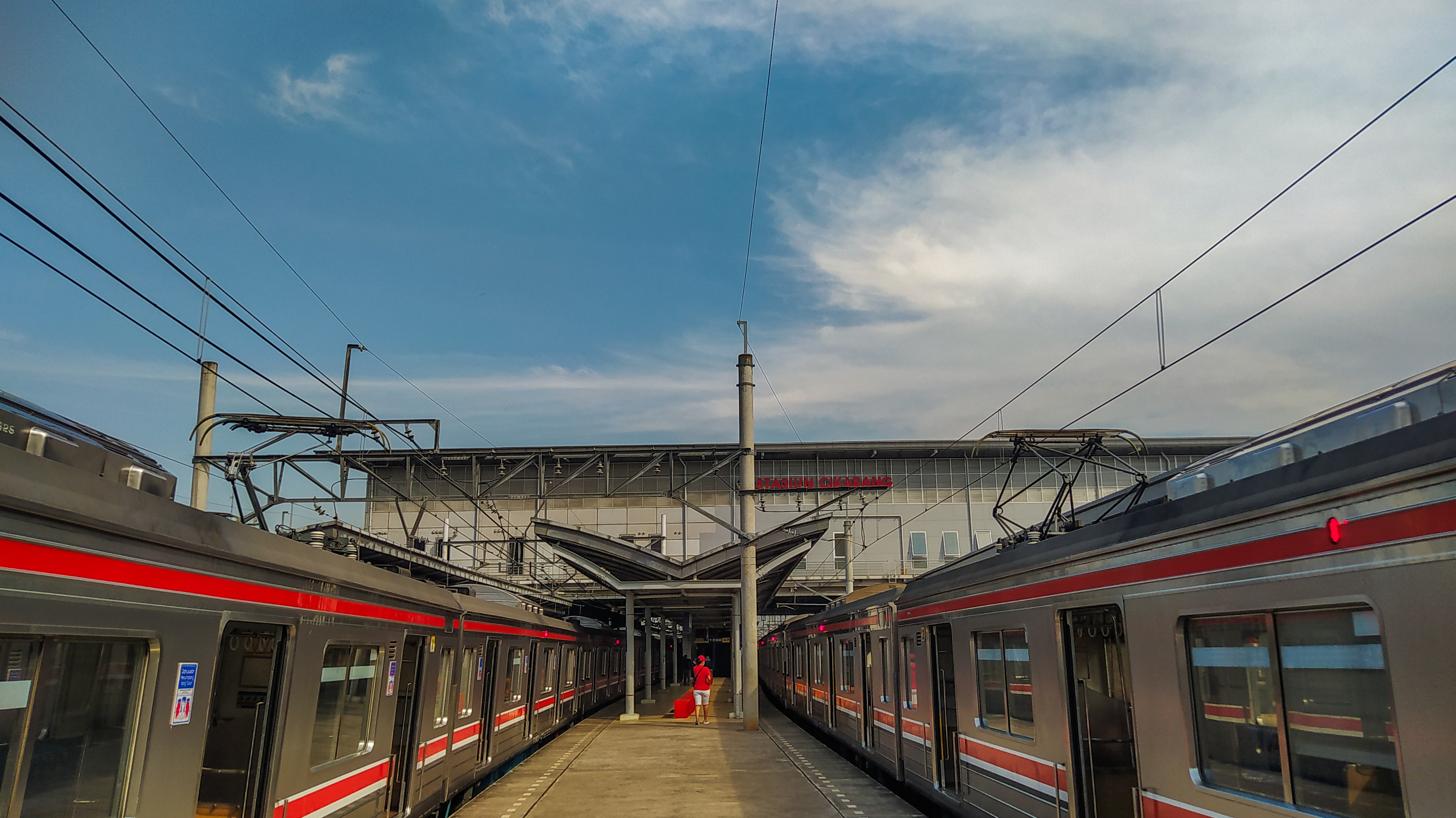
- The renovated building of Cikarang station (2022)

General information
- Location: Karangasih, North Cikarang, Bekasi Regency; West Java; Indonesia
- Coordinates: 6.255393°S 107.145129°E
- Elevation: +18 m (59 ft)
- Owner: Kereta Api Indonesia
- Operator: Kereta Api Indonesia; KAI Commuter
- Lines: Rajawali–Cikampek railway; Cikarang Loop Line; LW Walahar/Jatiluhur
- Distance: 43 km from Jakarta.
- Platforms: 4
- Tracks: 8

Construction
- Structure type: Ground
- Parking: Available
- Accessible: Available

Other information
- Station code: CKR • 0507
- Classification: Large type B

History
- Opened: 14 August 1890
- Rebuilt: 2013–2015 (south side); 2019–2021 (north side)
- Electrified: 2014
- Original company: Bataviasche Oosterspoorweg Maatschappij

Services
Preceding station		Following station
Metland Telagamurni towards Angke, Kampung Bandan or Jakarta Kota	Commuter Line Cikarang	Terminus
Terminus	Walahar	Lemahabang towards Purwakarta
Terminus	Jatiluhur	Lemahabang towards Cikampek
Location
- Location within Java

Cikarang Station (CKR) is a railway station located at Karangasih, North Cikarang, West Java in Indonesia, serving the town of Cikarang. Previously the station was only served by regional train services between West Java and Jakarta. It is included in the service area of Jakarta metro commuter rail since October 2017.

At present the station serves as the terminal stop for Jakarta metro commuter rail Blue Line. Regional train services such as Jatiluhur (runs between these station and Cikampek) and Walahar Express (Cikarang to Purwakarta) continue to serve this station. On the other hand, Manggarai–Cikarang doubled-double track (DDT) project was expected to be completed in 2020. Cikarang Station is located east of Cikarang river. A market also stands behind the station building.

== History ==
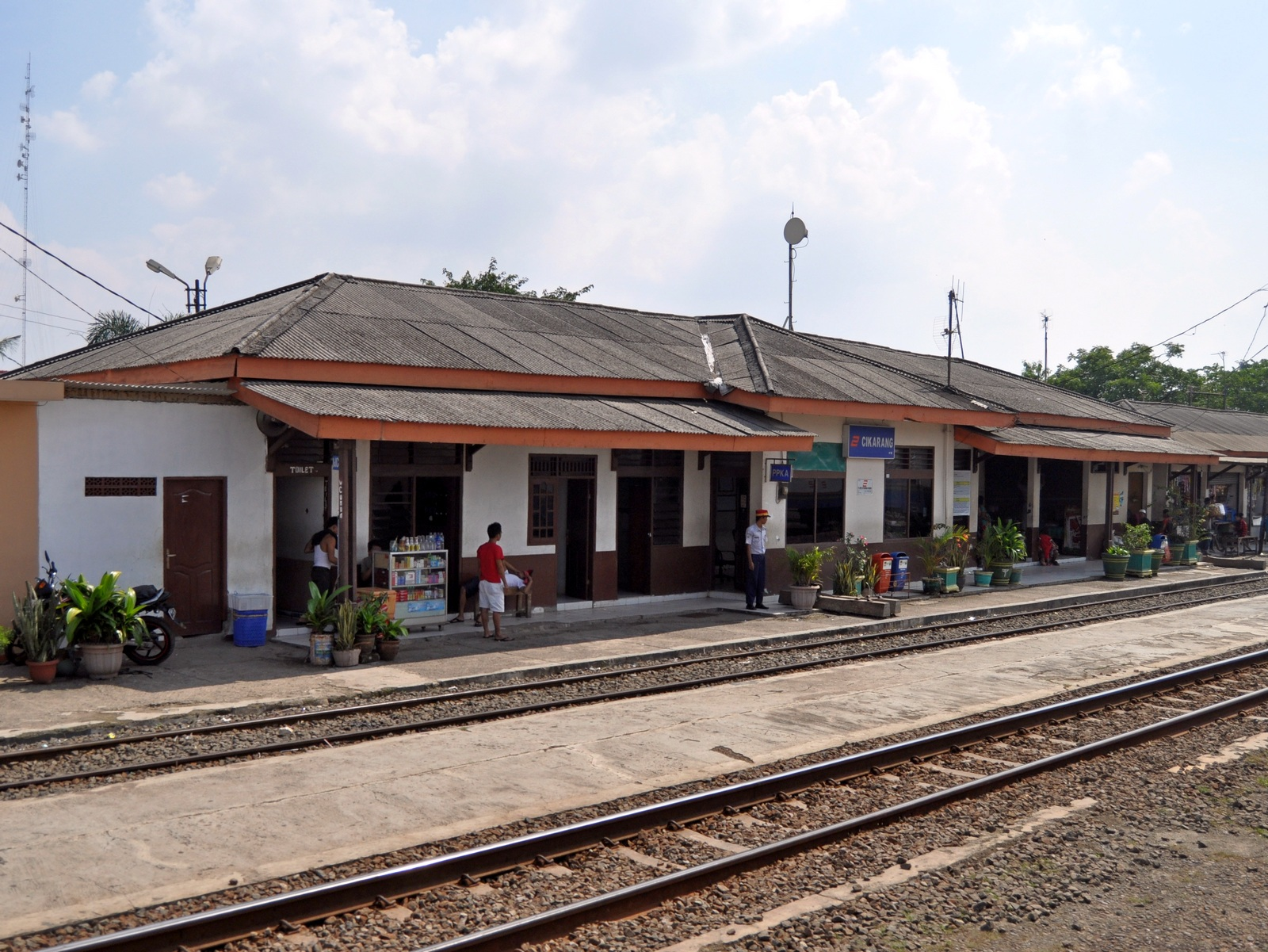
The original building of the Cikarang Station before it was demolished due to modernization and electrification

Cikarang Station was first opened by Bataviasche Oosterspoorweg Maatschappij (BOS) on 14 August 1890, and became an integral part of the opening of the Batavia to Karawang segment of the railroad network. At that time, the building still had the status of a railway stop with the Tjikarang railway stop and only had two railway lines in its emplacement. After the entire BOS rail network was acquired by Staatsspoorwegen, around the 1920s the number of lines increased to four. This increase allows Bumel trains to pick up and drop off passengers and goods at the Tjikarang railway stop. This transportation activity causes the area around it to become crowded, as evidenced by the existence of markets, barracks, dogcart terminals, and localization.

As time goes by, the role of the railway stop is increasing with the addition of a special rail line behind the railway stop building. The rail line has the status of a buffer stop and is focused on loading and unloading of goods, such as; rice, teak leaves, wood, salt, and livestock transportation. This loading and unloading activity reached its peak in the 1970s to 1980s. Particularly for livestock transportation, the loading and unloading activities continued at least until c. 2001-2002.

In the early 1990s, the Ministry of Transportation had planned to build a Jabodetabek outer ring rail network that would connect this station with Parungpanjang Station, Citayam Station, and Sungai Lagoa Station. One of the goals is to minimize freight trains crossing urban areas in Jakarta. At first the plan went quite well with the completion of the Citayam to Nambo rail network segment, but the 1997 Asian financial crisis made this plan stopped halfway.

== Building and layout ==
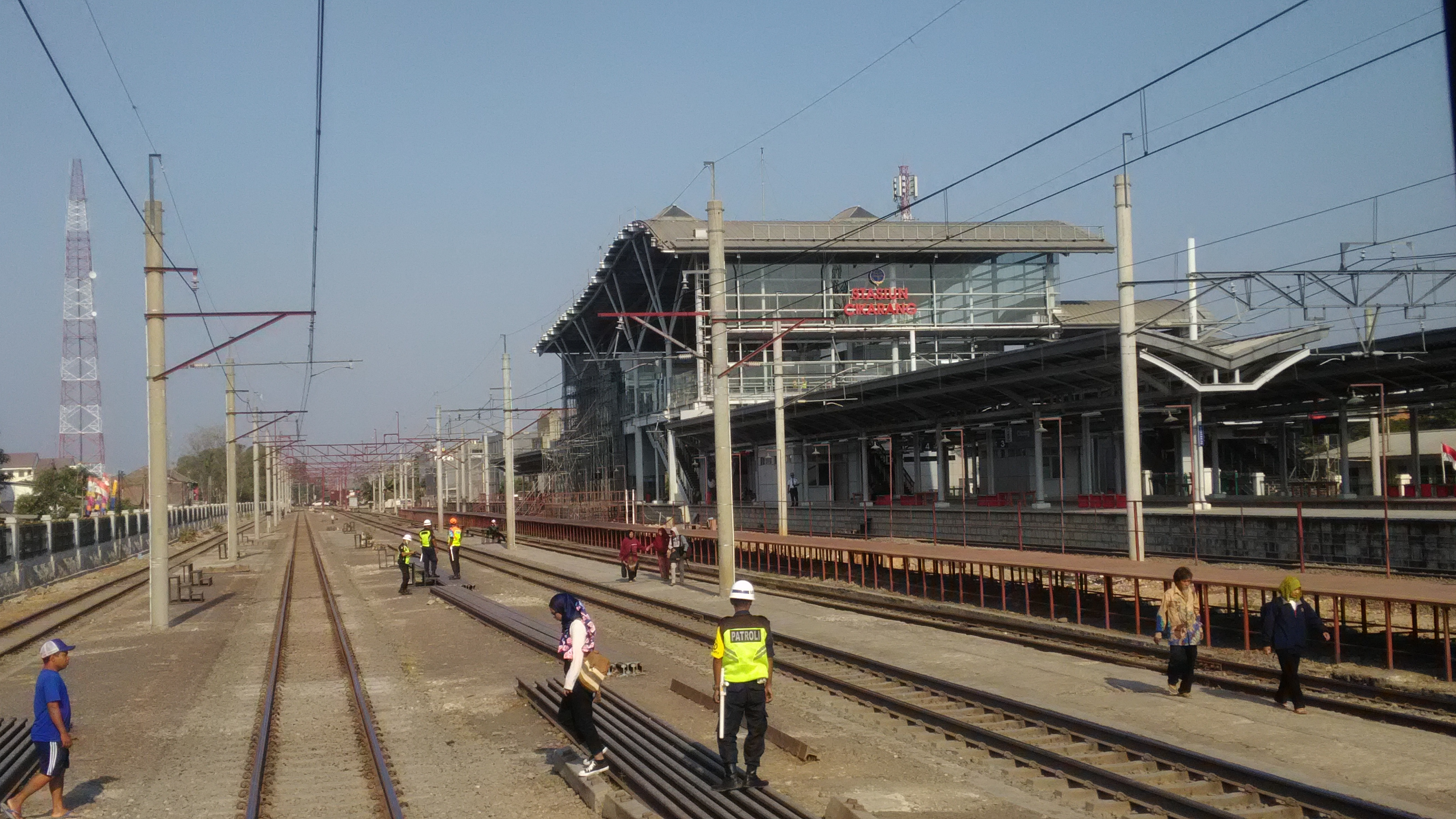
The south building of Cikarang Station (2018)

Cikarang Station is located east of the Cikarang River and behind Pasar Lama. In addition, not far from this station there are also the Toapekong (Chinatown) and Kaum (Kauman) areas. A few hundred meters east-northeast of this station has always been known as Tangsi. Thus this station has played an important role in the development of the Cikarang area in the past.

With the Doubled-Double Track (quadruple-track railway) project between this station and Manggarai Station, the station building was renovated on a large scale starting in 2014. The first phase of renovations focused on electrification across Bekasi Station to Cikarang, adding new buildings on the south side, and adding four new rail lines on the south side, especially for KRL Commuterline. In addition, a new bridge was also built which contains two rail lines over the river which are located next to the old bridge. The first phase of the renovation lasted until mid-2017 and then was inaugurated on 17 September 2017, simultaneously with the extension of the KRL Commuterline network. The extension of the KRL network from Jakarta Kota Station to Cikarang resulted in the addition of three new stations to serve commuter passengers, namely Metland Telagamurni, Cibitung and Bekasi Timur Stations.

After the construction of the south side is completed, from June 2020 to July 2021 the construction of the north side of the Cikarang Station building will be carried out by temporarily dismantling the four old lines. This demolition had an impact on rail traffic which was directed towards the south side. This temporary demolition aims to facilitate construction activities as well as extend the platform, which allows long-distance trains (Indonesian: Kereta Api Jarak Jauh (KAJJ)) to stop at this station. Apart from that, at the east end of the station emplacement there is also a stabling yard to store the KRL series.

As of 23 August 2021 the four old lines have returned to operation, so the number of train lines at this station has increased to eight lines with the change in number from the old lines 1-4 to lines 5-8. Since December 2021, the old electrical signaling system has been replaced with a new one produced by PT Len Industri.

Starting on 19 January 2022, the building on the north side of the station began to fully operational. Since then, the Walahar Ekspres and Jatiluhur Ekspres train stops have been moved to line 5. Then, starting 1 February 2022, these stations will start serving long-distance train passengers.

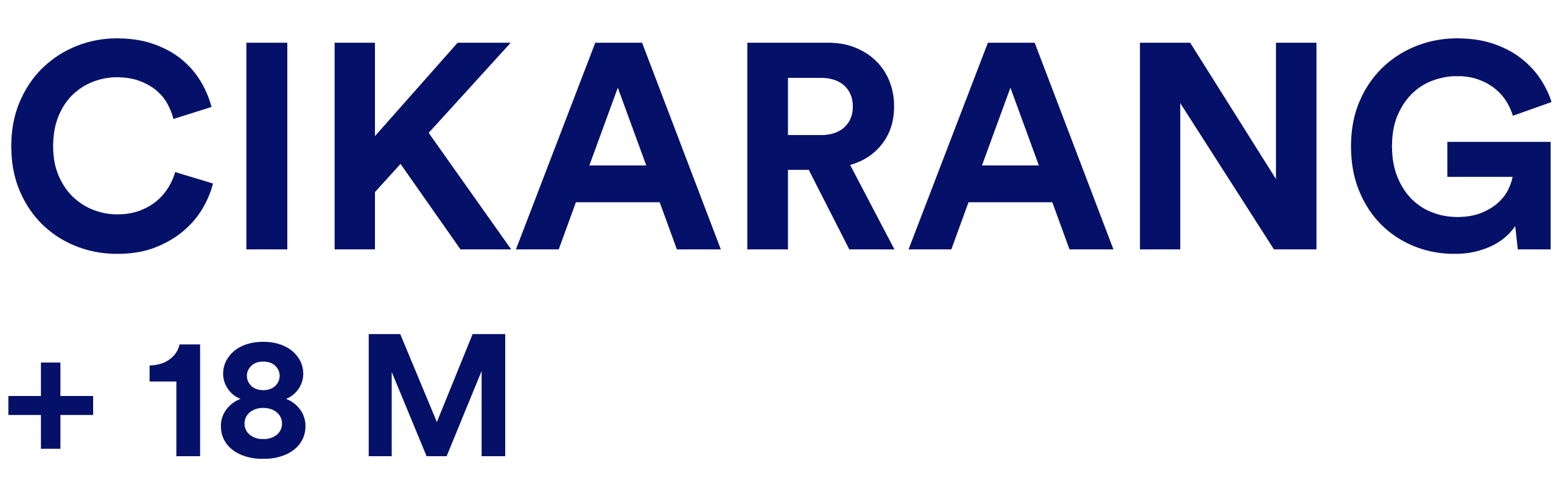
C30 LW01
Line 8
Intercity-train stop from the east to Jatinegara
Island platform
Line 7
Direct tracks to Jatinegara
Line 6
Intercity-train stop from Jatinegara
Direct tracks to Cikampek
Island platform
Line 5
Intercity-train stop from Jatinegara
LW

Walahar Express/Jatiluhur Local Train from and towards Purwakarta (Lemahabang) →
LW Jatilhur/Cikampek Local Train from and towards Cikampek (Lemahabang) →

Line 4
LW Walahar Express/Jatilhur Local Train from and towards Purwakarta (Lemahabang) →

LW Jatilhur/Cikampek Local Train from and towards Cikampek (Cikampek) →

← (Metland Telagamurni) Cikarang Loop Line towards Jatinegara loop

Island platform
Line 3
← (Metland Telagamurni) Cikarang Loop Line towards Jatinegara loop
Line 2
← (Metland Telagamurni) Cikarang Loop Line towards Jatinegara loop
Island platform
Line 1
← (Metland Telagamurni) Cikarang Loop Line towards Jatinegara loop
G
Main building

== Services ==
The following is a list of train services at the Cikarang Station.

=== Passenger services ===
==== Inter-city trains ====
Route	Train service name	Class	Last destination	Notes
Southern Java routes	Parahyangan (additional)	Executive and premium economy	Bandung	Only afternoon schedules (Traim 52A)
Southern Java routes	Parahyangan (additional)	Executive and premium economy	Jakarta Gambir	Only night schedules (KA 53F)
Southern Java routes	Bogowonto	Executive and premium economy	Jakarta Pasar Senen	–
Southern Java routes	Sawunggalih	Executive and premium economy	Kutoarjo	–
Southern Java routes	Gaya Baru Malam Selatan	Executive and economy	Jakarta Pasar Senen	–
Southern Java routes	Gaya Baru Malam Selatan	Executive and economy	Surabaya Gubeng	–
Southern Java routes	Bangunkarta	Executive and economy	Jakarta Pasar Senen	–
Southern Java routes	Bangunkarta	Executive and economy	Jombang	–
Southern Java routes	Bengawan	Economy	Purwosari	–
Southern Java routes	Bengawan	Economy	Jakarta Pasar Senen	–
Southern Java routes	Serayu	Economy	Purwokerto	Via Kiaracondong
Southern Java routes	Serayu	Economy	Jakarta Pasar Senen	Via Kiaracondong
Central Java routes	Brawijaya	Executive	Malang	–
Central Java routes	Brawijaya	Executive	Jakarta Gambir	–
Central Java routes	Brantas	Executive and economy	Blitar	–
Central Java routes	Brantas	Executive and economy	Jakarta Pasar Senen	–
Northern Java routed	Sembrani (additional)	Executive	Surabaya Pasarturi	–
Northern Java routed	Sembrani (additional)	Executive	Jakarta Gambir	–
Northern Java routed	Gumarang	Executive and Economy	Surabaya Pasarturi	–
Northern Java routed	Gumarang	Executive and Economy	Jakarta Pasar Senen	–
Northern Java routed	Kertajaya	Premium economy	Surabaya Pasarturi	-
Northern Java routed	Tegal Bahari	Economy	Tegal	Sometimes added with executive class
Northern Java routed	Tegal Bahari	Economy	Jakarta Pasar Senen	Sometimes added with executive class
Northern Java routed	Airlangga	Economy	Surabaya Pasarturi	–
Northern Java routed	Airlangga	Economy	Jakarta Pasar Senen	–
Northern Java routed	Matarmaja	Economy	Malang	–

==== KAI Commuter ====
- Cikarang Loop Line (Full Racket), to Cikarang (looping through Manggarai-Kampung Bandan-Pasar Senen and vice versa)
- Cikarang Loop Line (Half Racket), to Angke/Kampung Bandan (via Tanah Abang and Duri)

LW Jatiluhur and Walahar Commuter Line, to Purwakarta

- Jatiluhur and Walahar Commuter Line, to Cikampek

== Gallery ==
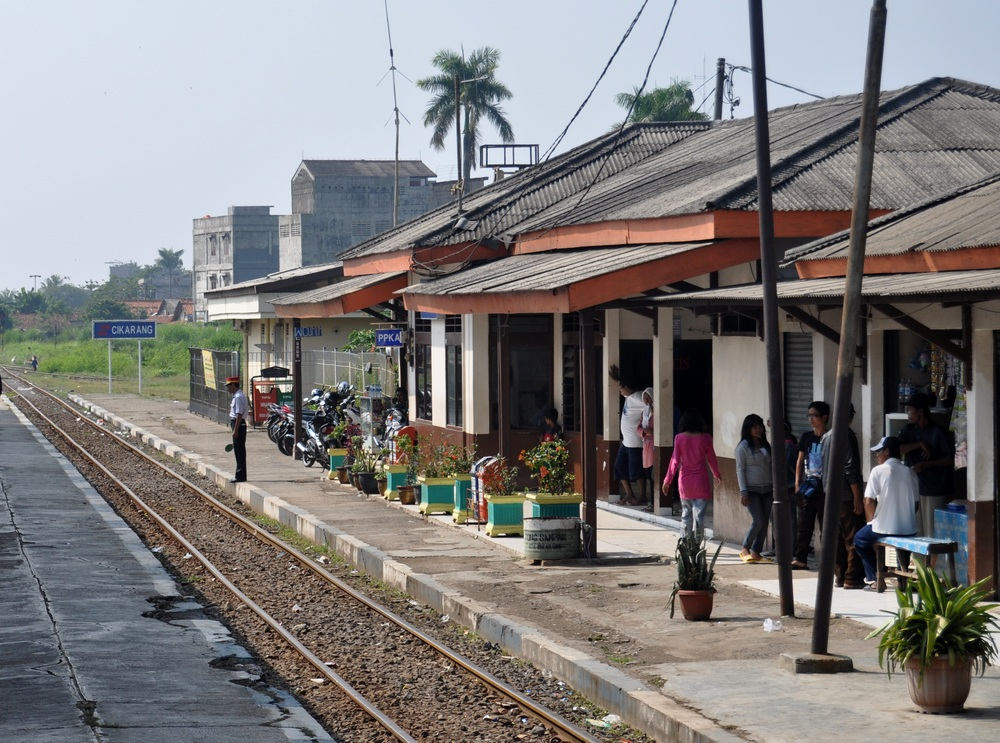
The old building of Cikarang station, taken from the west in 2010

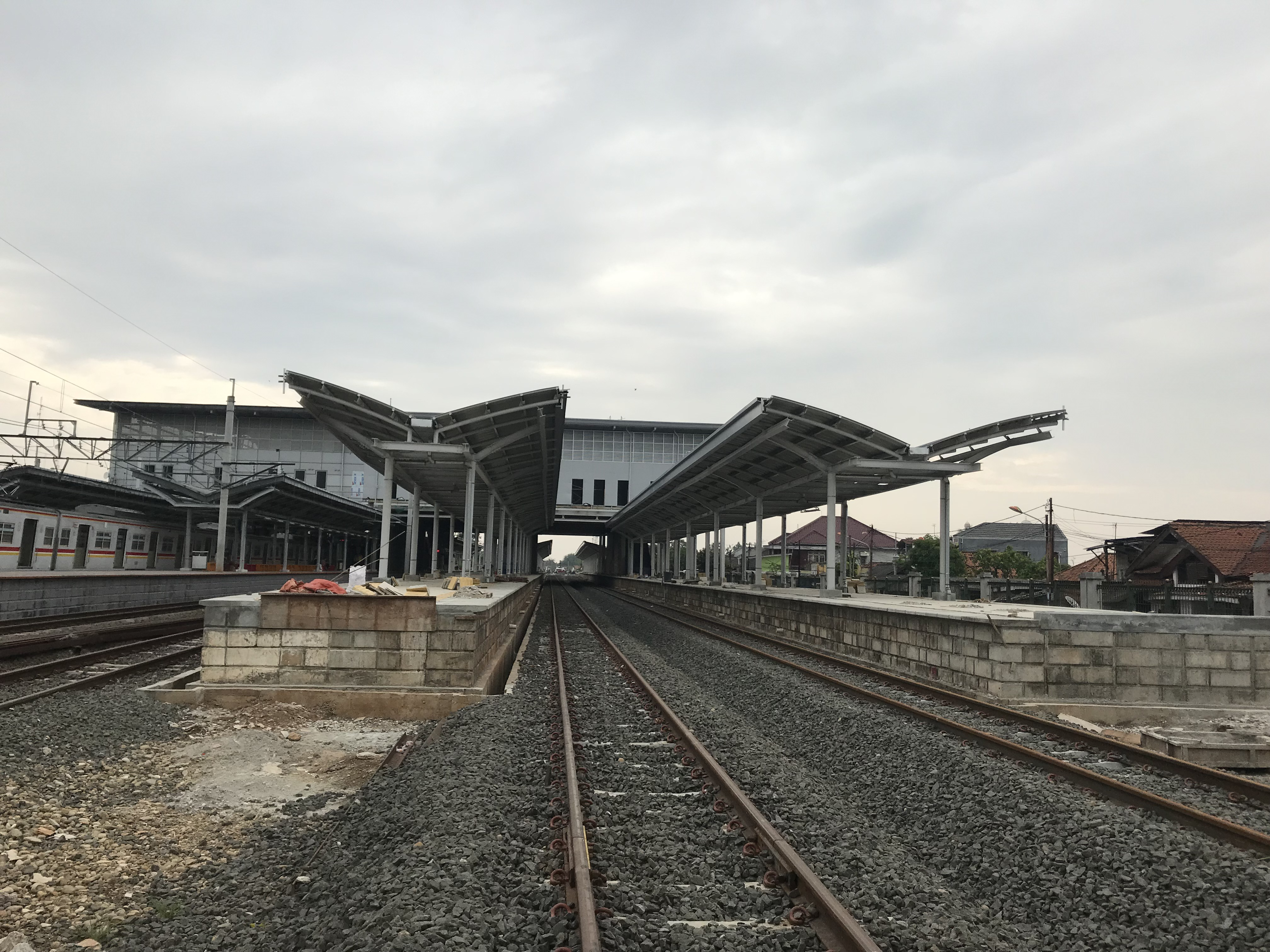
The new emplacement of the Cikarang Station seen from the east side of the station (May 2021)

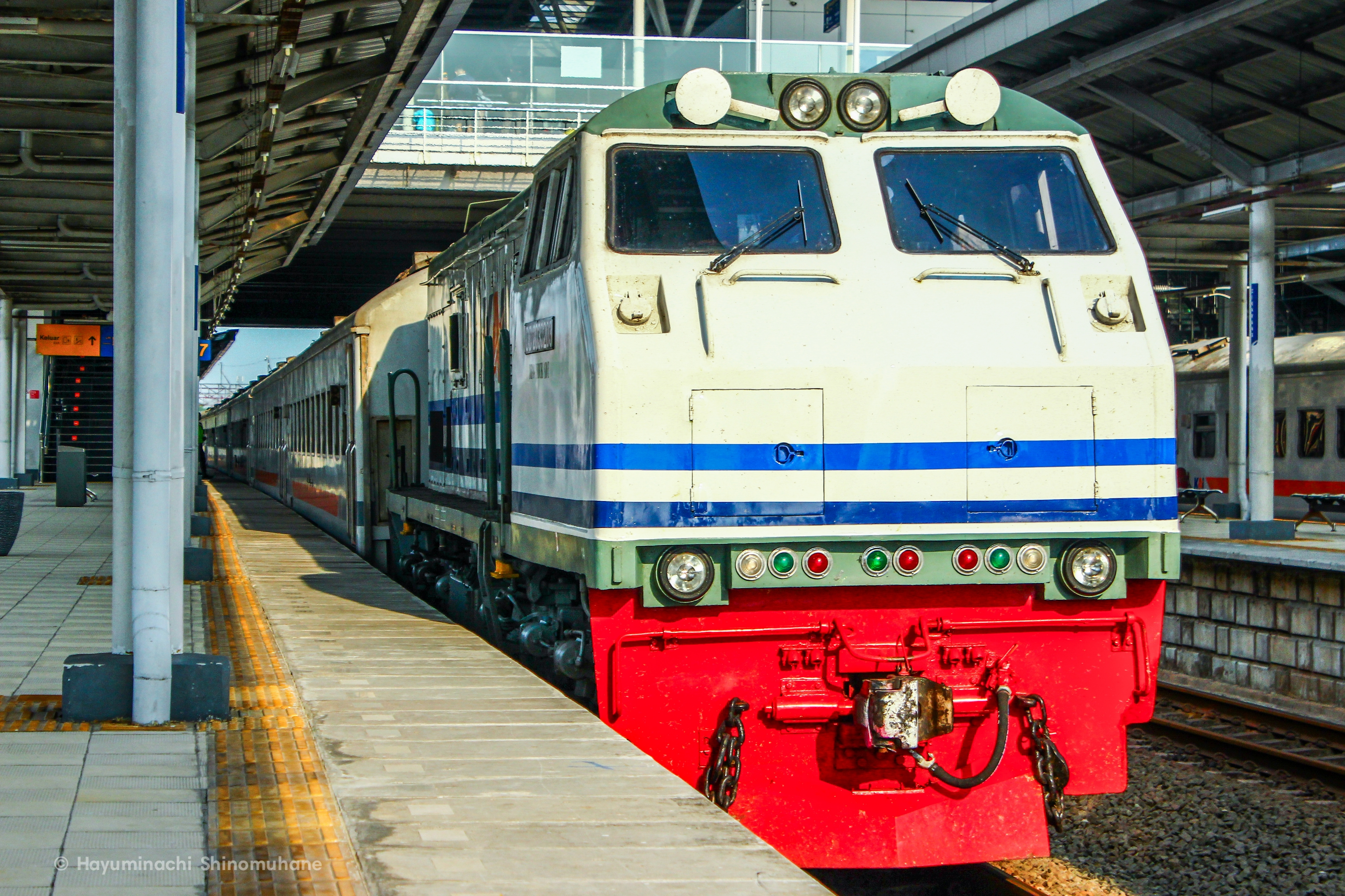
Bangunkarta in Cikarang Station.

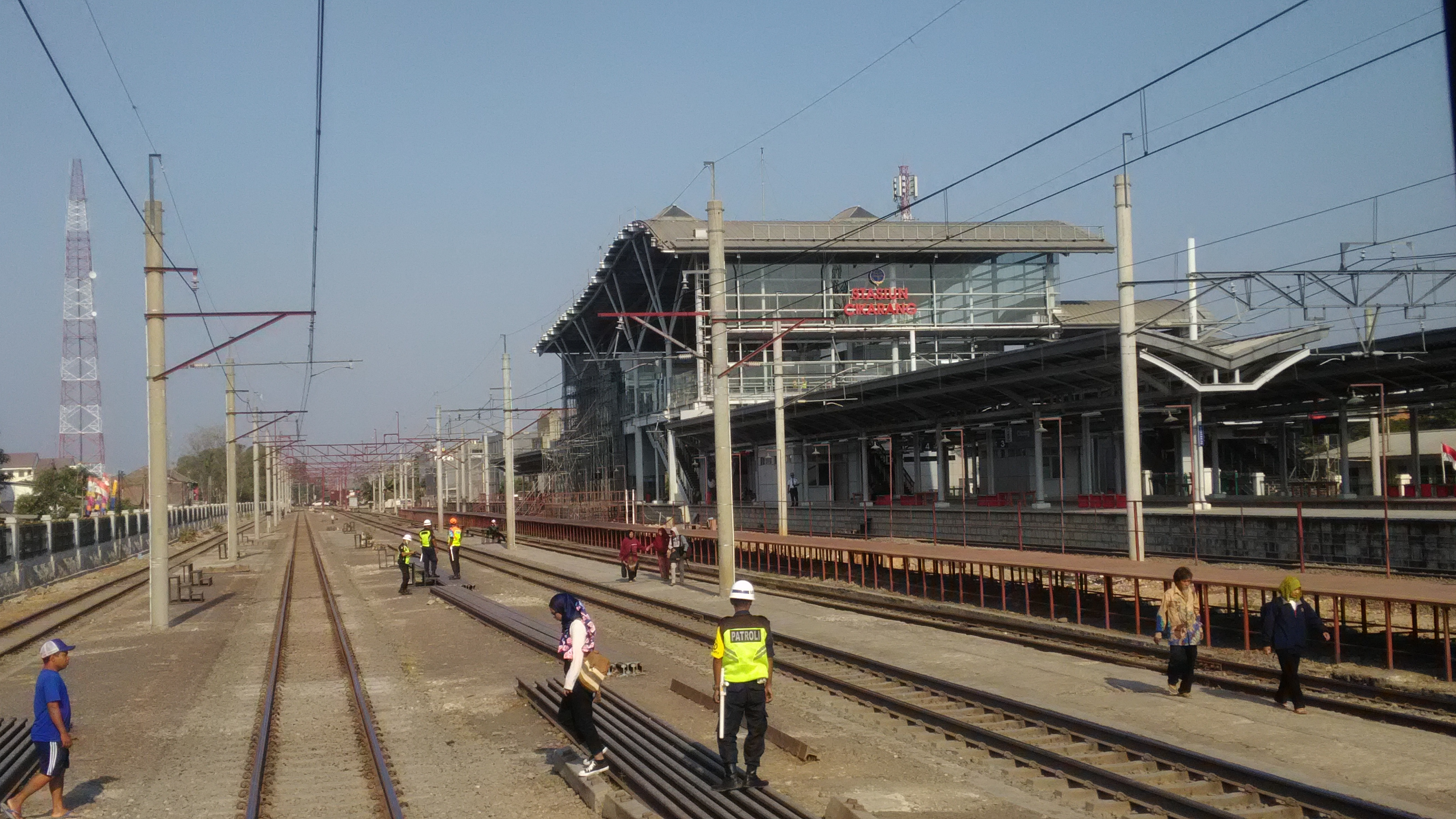
In front The new Cikarang Station.

Preceding station	Kereta Api Indonesia	Following station
Metland Telagamurni towards Rajawali	Rajawali–Cikampek	Lemahabang towards Cikampek
