= Cikampek railway station =

Railway station in Indonesia

LW08 Cikampek Station Stasiun Cikampek
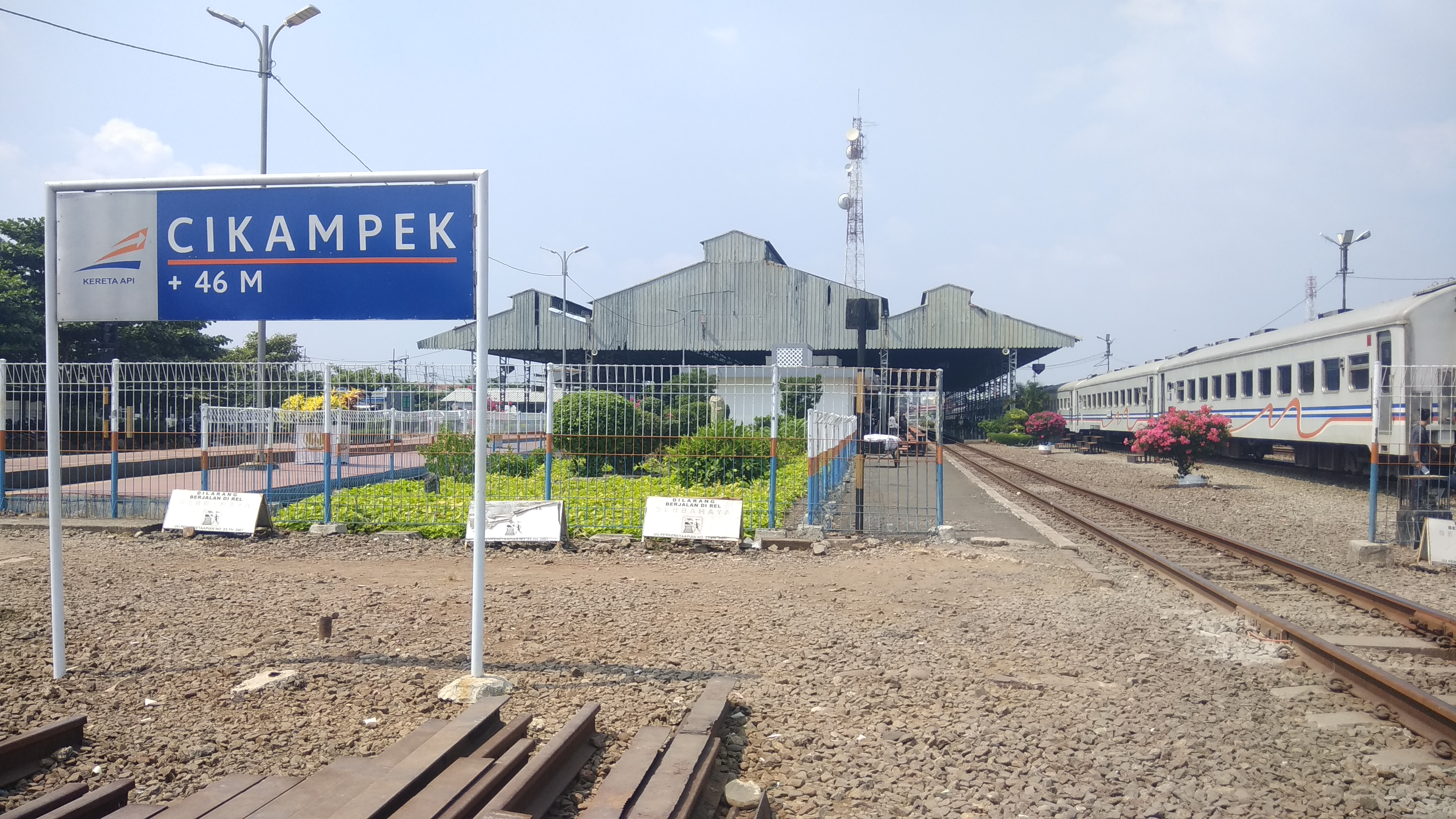
- The signage and the emplacement of the Cikampek Station (2019)

General information
- Location: Jl. Stasiun Cikampek, Cikampek Kota, Cikampek, Karawang Regency; West Java; Indonesia
- Coordinates: 6.4060407°S 107.4590401°E
- Elevation: +46 m (151 ft)
- Owner: Kereta Api Indonesia
- Operator: Kereta Api Indonesia
- Lines: Rajawali–Cikampek; Cikampek–Cirebon Prujakan; Cikampek–Padalarang; LW Walahar/Jatiluhur
- Platforms: 5 island platforms
- Tracks: 8

Construction
- Structure type: Ground
- Parking: Available
- Accessible: Available

Other information
- Station code: CKP • 0530
- Classification: Large class type B

History
- Opened: 27 December 1902
- Former names: Tjikampek Station

Passengers
- 2019: 798.335
Location
- Location within Java

Cikampek Station (CKP) is a large class type B railway station located in Cikampek Kota, Cikampek, Karawang Regency. The station, which is located at an altitude of +46 meters, is the station that is located in the easternmost part of the Operational Area I Jakarta and Karawang Regency, and is the largest railway station in Karawang Regency.

The station is one of the important stations for train travel from Jakarta to various cities on the Java region. To the east of the station, the line forks two, the northern line goes to Cirebon Prujakan, while the southern line goes to Padalarang.

Based on data from Karawang Regency Statistics, as many as 798,335 local and intercity train passengers have been served by this station. Based on this data, Cikampek Station is the station with the most passengers in Karawang Regency.

== History ==
After Staatsspoorwegen (SS) bought the Batavia–Krawang railway line from Bataviasche Oosterspoorweg Maatschappij (BOS) in 1898, the line was then developed, one of which was by extending the line from Kedunggedeh to Cikampek. The line extension to Cikampek Station was inaugurated on 27 December 1902.

At that time, SS had planned to build a new railway line on the Cikampek–Padalarang section as an alternative to the Jakarta–Bandung route. SS's wish at that time was due to the high demand for a faster train to get to its destination. The Cikampek–Padalarang cross route was successfully opened on 2 May 1906. From Cikampek Station, construction was also directed towards Cirebon, which was opened on 3 June 1912.

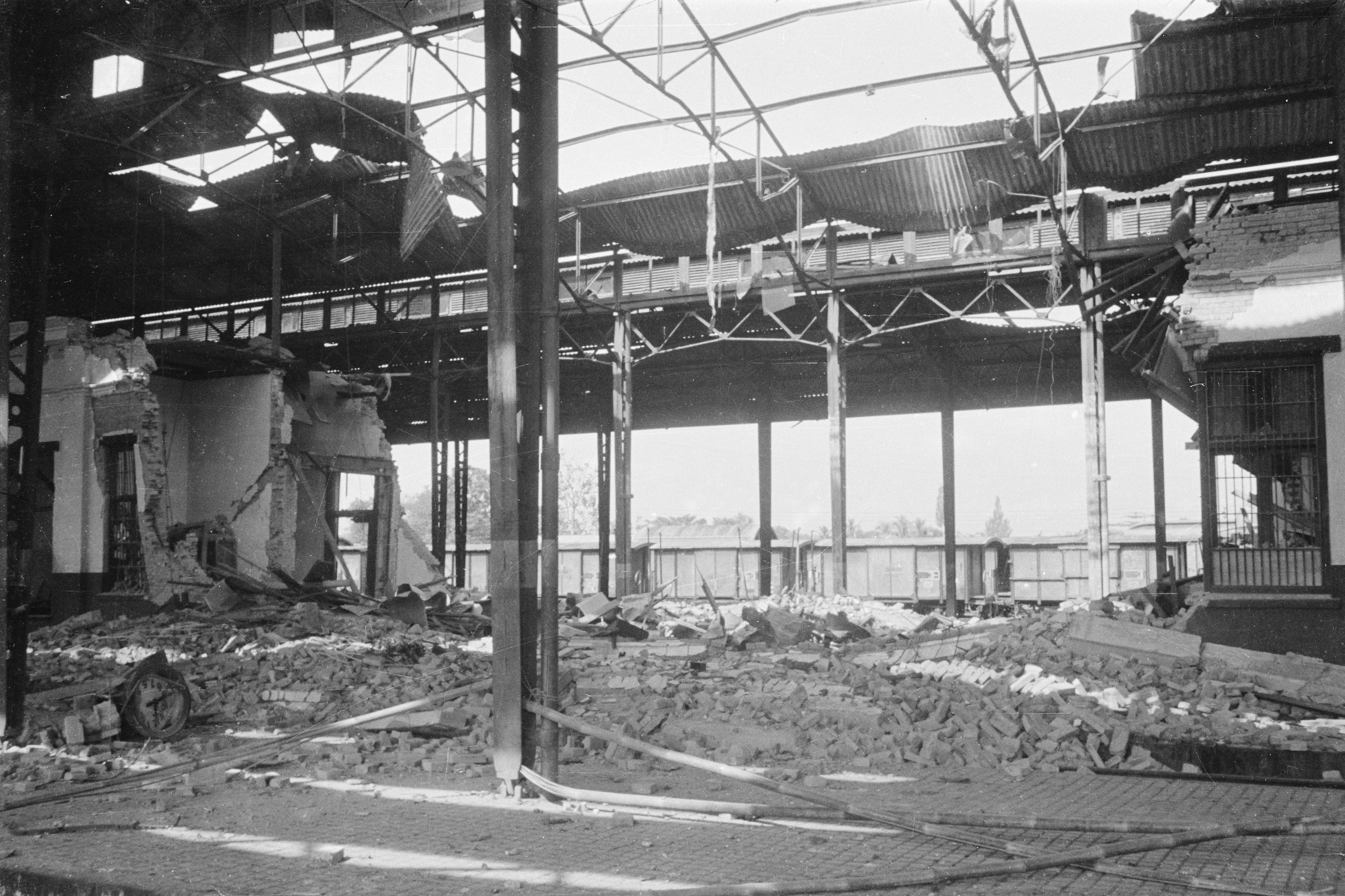
The Cikampek Station building which was destroyed during the revolutionary war (23 July 1946)

The station building was destroyed during the First Dutch Military Aggression in 1947. Only the roof canopy of the station is still original, while the rooms have been renovated during the era of the Railway Service (Djawatan Kereta Api or DKA) in the 1950s.

== Building and layout ==
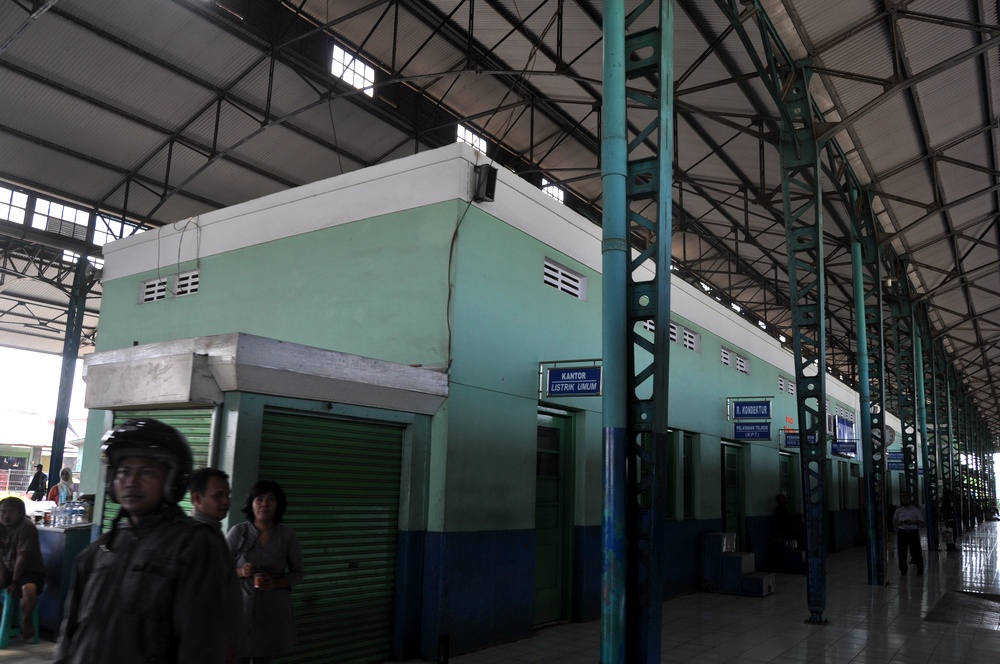
The building of the Cikampek station which is an island station (2010)

The Cikampek Station building is an island station and has eight tracks. Line 3 is a straight gauge which is usually used for trains going directly to Jakarta, line 4 is a straight gauge for trains going directly to Cirebon and line 6 is a straight track towards Purwakarta.

To the south of the station, there is a railway turntable which is used to turning the direction of the locomotive.

The yard of the Cikampek Station emplacement is also the site where unspoored or grounded hydraulic diesel locomotive units belonging to the Tanah Abang Locomotive Depot which are no longer in operation and are no longer used, such as C300 locomotives, BB304 locomotives, BB306 locomotives, BB303 locomotives and BB300 locomotives.

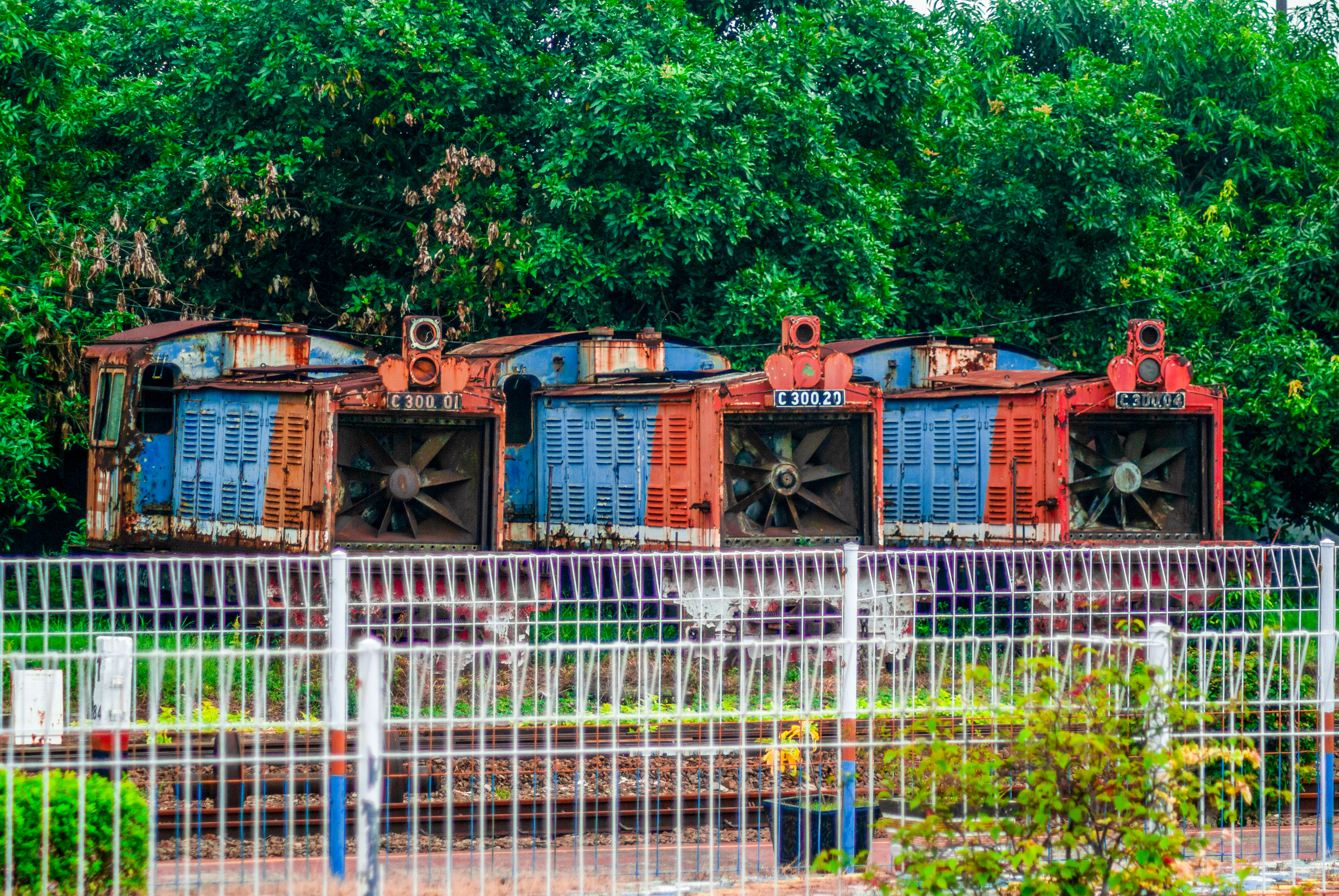
C300 01, 24, and 04 locomotive wrecks on the Cikampek Station emplacement yard

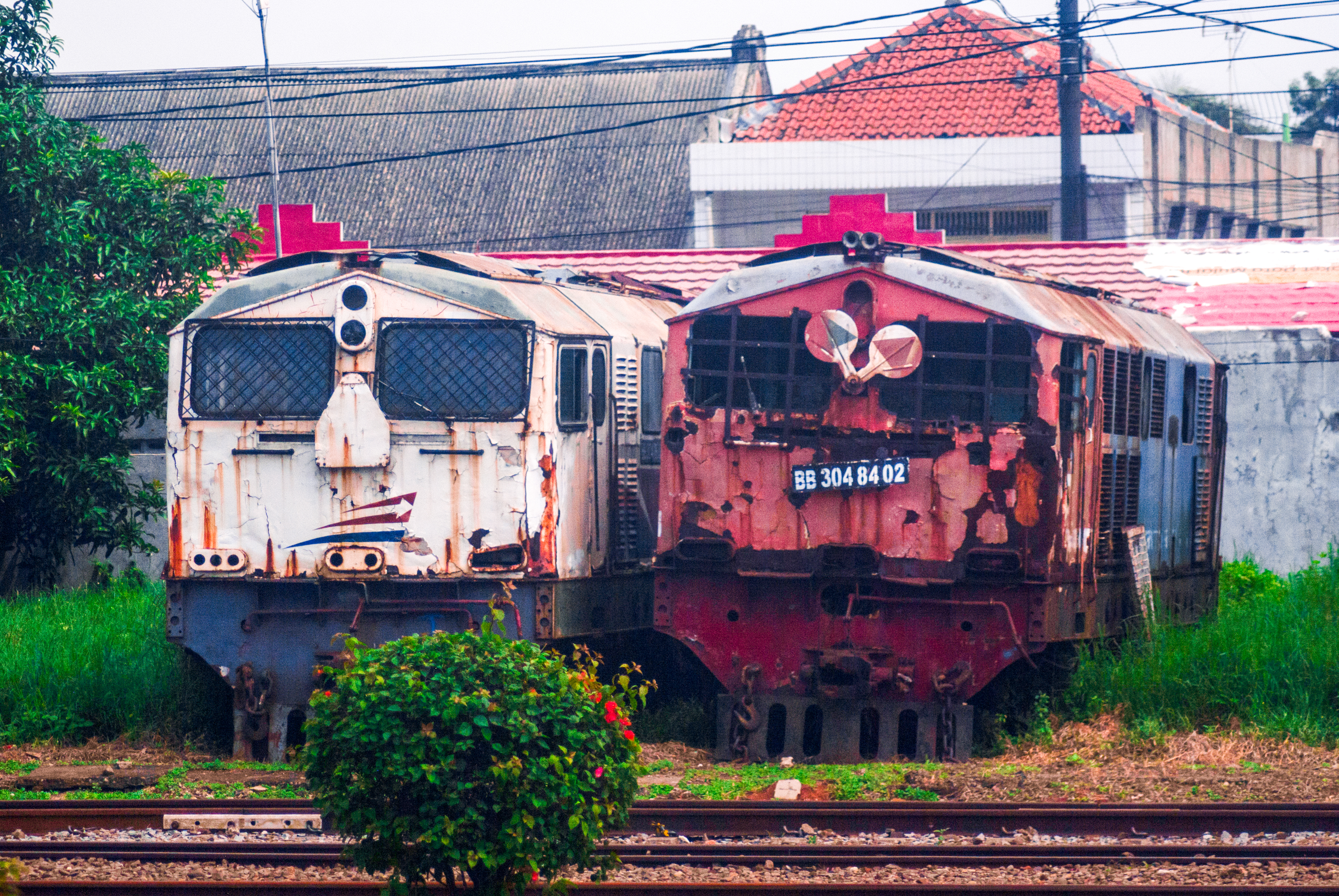
BB 304 76 06 (BB304 06) and BB 304 84 02 (BB304 16) locomotive wrecks on the Cikampek Station emplacement yard

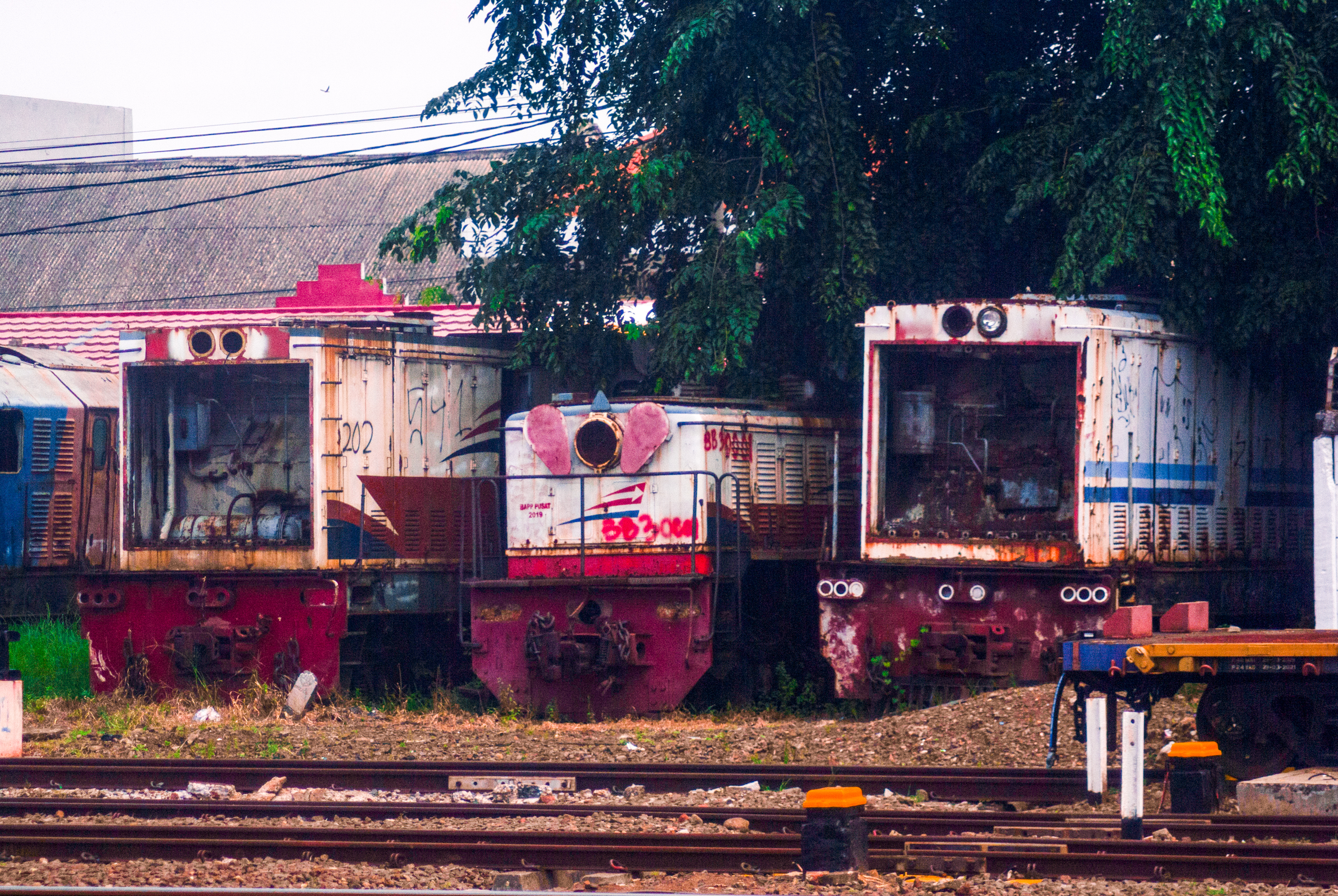
BB306 08, BB300 01 and BB303 locomotive wrecks on the Cikampek Station emplacement yard

Since March 2022, the old electrical signaling system at this station has been replaced with a new one produced by PT Len Industri. The emplacement of this station is extended to the west, in order to accommodate long trains of freight (especially container) that cross or are overtaken by other trains at this station.

== Services ==
The following is a list of train services at the Cikampek Station.

=== Passenger services ===
- Mixed class
  - Argo Cheribon, to Gambir and to Cirebon (executive–economy)
  - Argo Parahyangan, to Gambir and to Bandung (executive–economy)
  - Ciremai, to Bandung and to Semarang Tawang (executive–business)
  - Harina, to Bandung and to Surabaya Pasar Turi (executive–economy)
  - Jayabaya, to Pasar Senen and to Malang via Surabaya Pasar Turi (executive–economy)
  - Singasari, to Pasar Senen and to Blitar (executive–economy)
- Economy class
  - Serayu, to Purwokerto via Kiaracondong
  - Tegal Express, to Pasar Senen and to Tegal
- Local train
  - Walahar Express, to Cikarang and to Purwakarta
  - Jatiluhur, from and to Cikarang

=== Freight services ===
- Over-night service, to Jakarta Gudang and to:
  - Surabaya Pasar Turi via Semarang Tawang–Cepu
  - Malang via Purwokerto–Lempuyangan–Madiun–Blitar

== Gallery ==
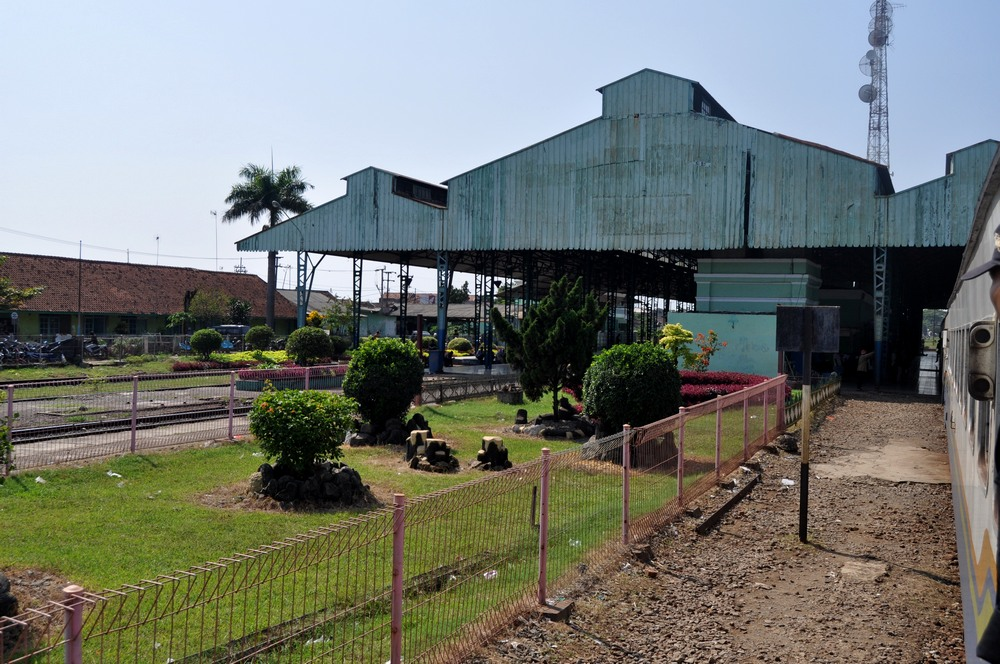
The canopy of the station (2010)

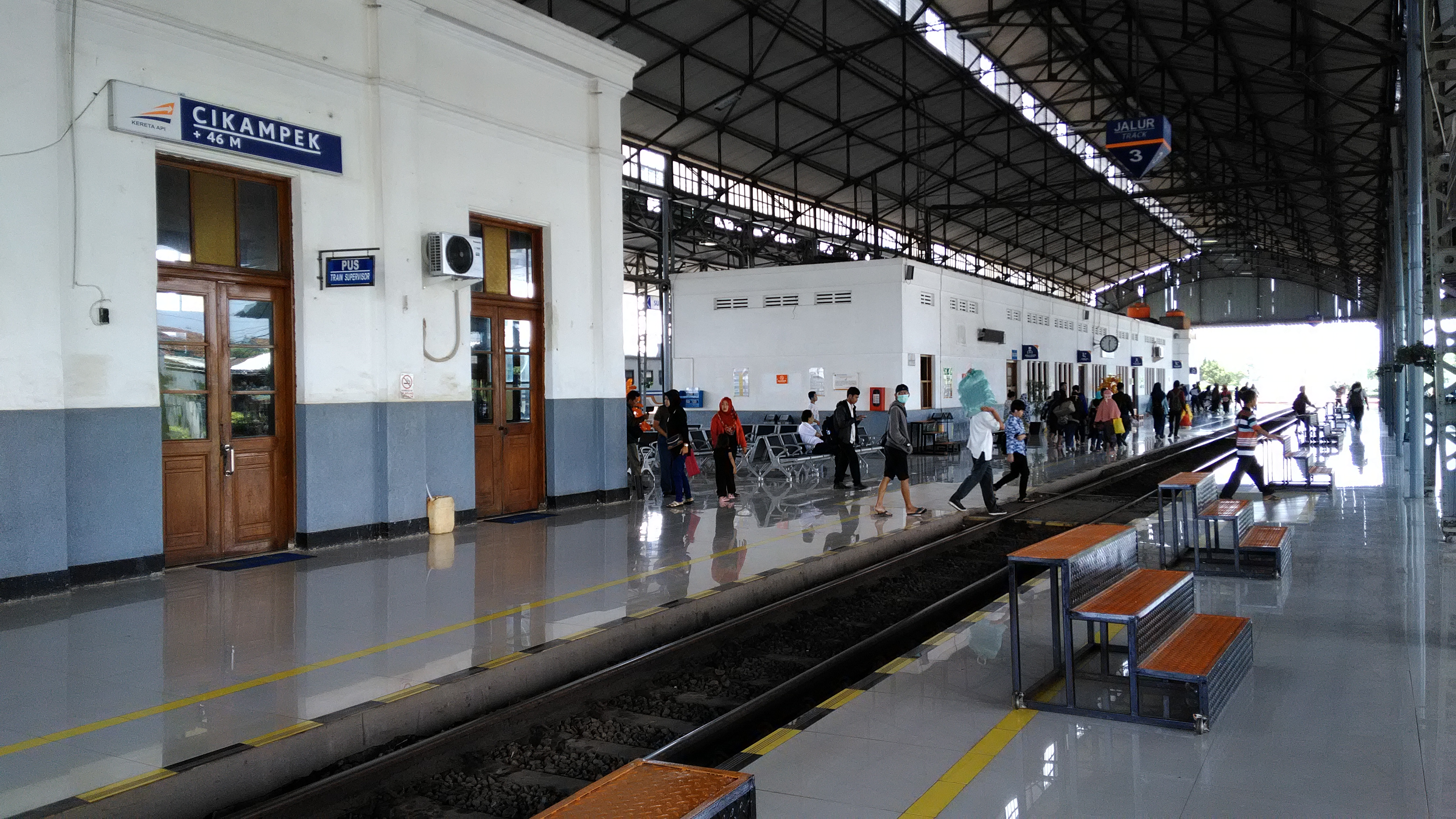
The emplacement and platform of Cikampek station at daylight (2017)

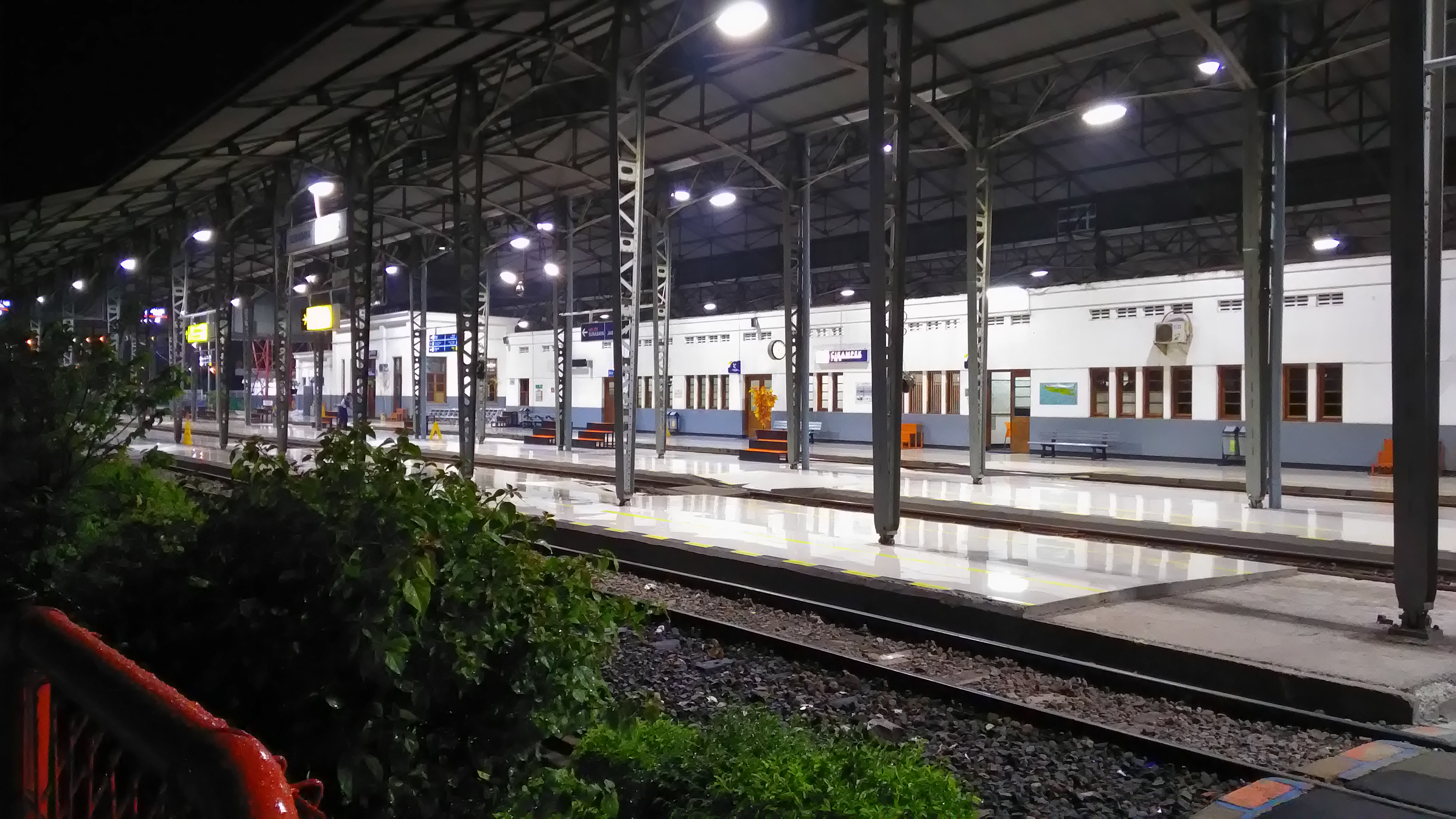
The emplacement and platform of the station at night (2017)

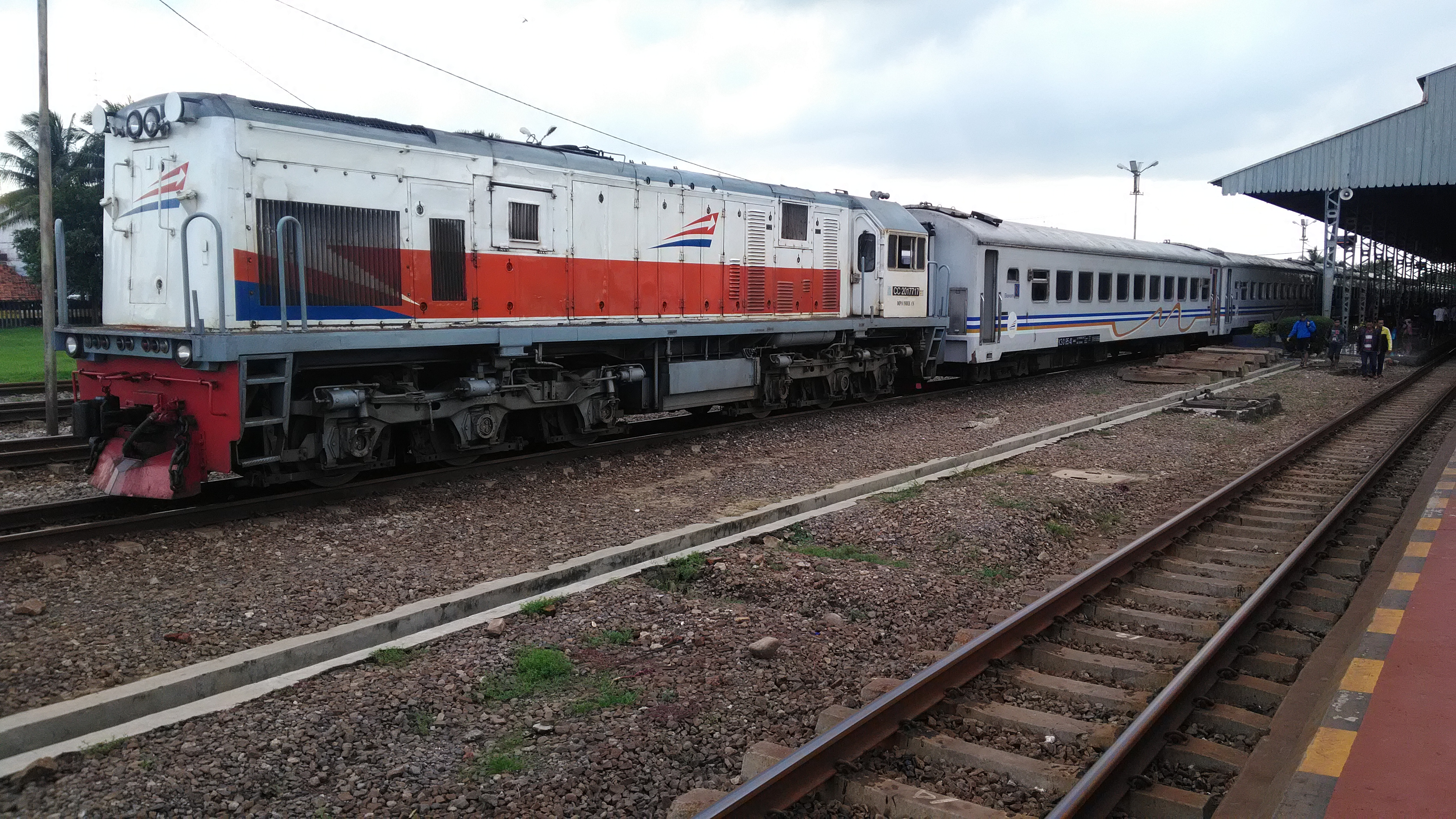
The Walahar Express train at Cikampek Station (2017)

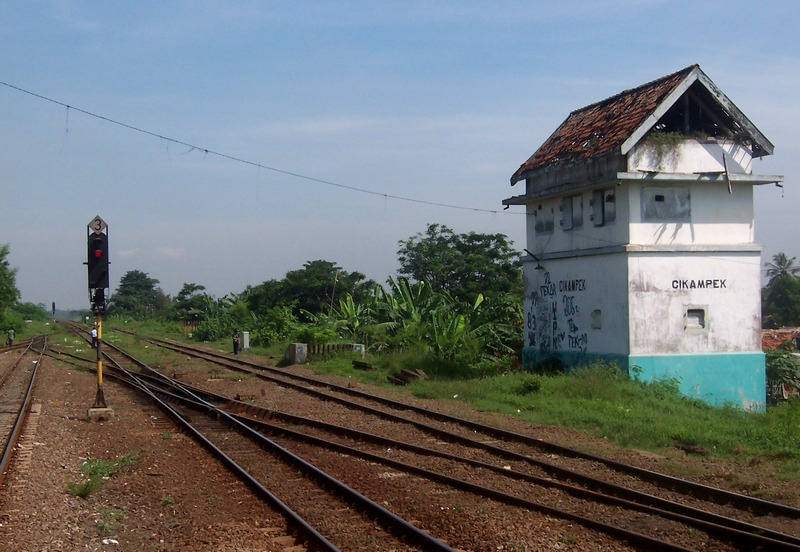
The inactive west signal house of Cikampek station (2006)

Preceding station	Kereta Api Indonesia	Following station
Dawuan towards Rajawali	Rajawali–Cikampek	Terminus
Terminus	Cikampek–Cirebon Prujakan	Tanjungrasa towards Cirebon Prujakan
Terminus	Cikampek–Padalarang	Cibungur towards Padalarang
