= Purwakarta railway station =

Railway station in Indonesia

LW10 Purwakarta Station Stasiun Purwakarta
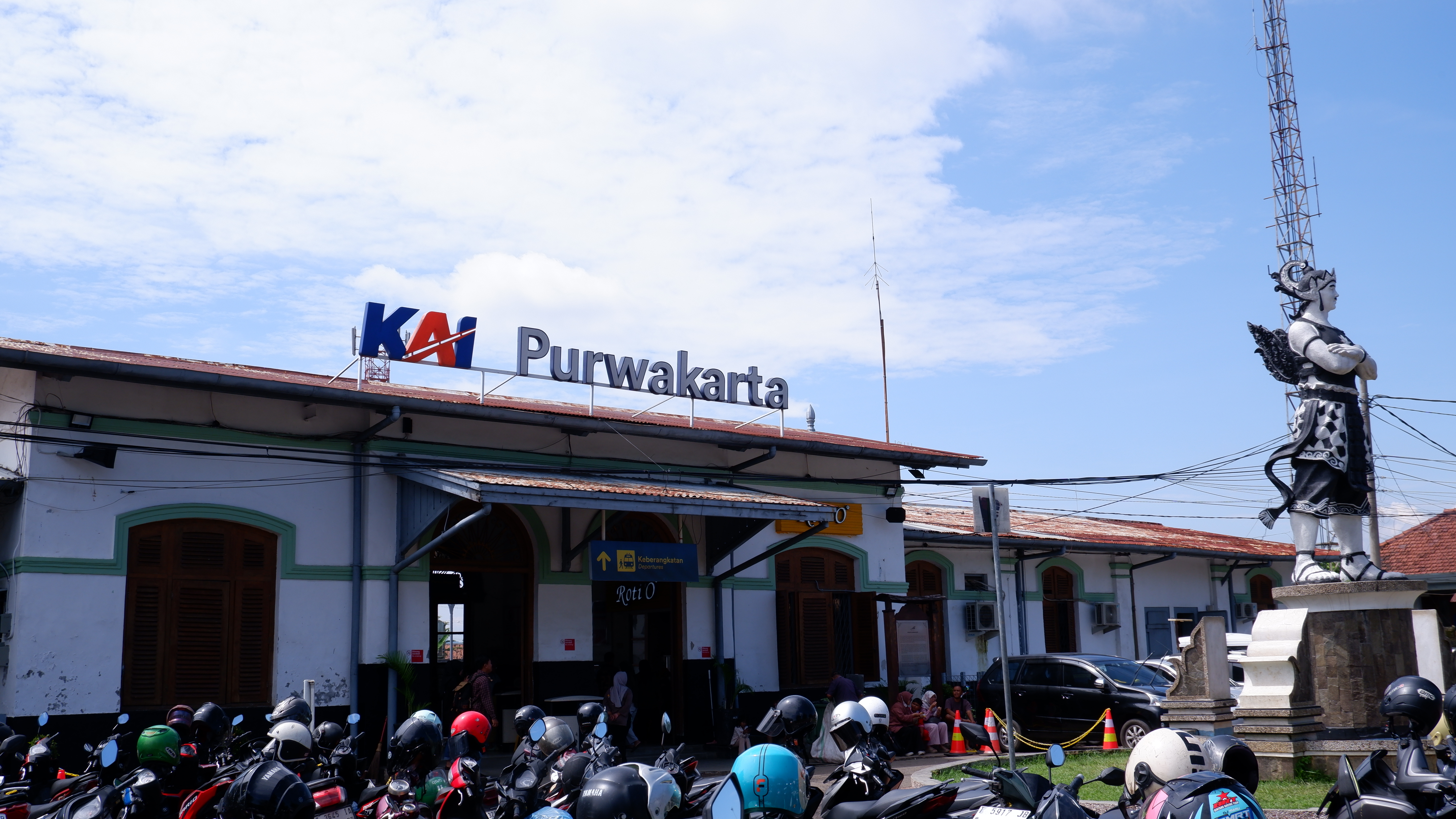
- Purwakarta Station as of 19 May 2025

General information
- Location: Jl. Kolonel Kornel Singawinata No. 1, Nagritengah, Purwakarta, Purwakarta Regency; West Java; Indonesia
- Coordinates: 6.5527886°S 107.4463964°E
- Elevation: +84 m (276 ft)
- Owner: Kereta Api Indonesia
- Operator: Kereta Api Indonesia
- Lines: B Greater Bandung Commuter Line; G Garut Commuter Line; Walahar/Jatiluhur Commuter Line; Cikampek–Padalarang
- Platforms: 1 side platform 2 island platforms
- Tracks: 6

Construction
- Structure type: Ground
- Parking: Available
- Accessible: Yes

Other information
- Station code: PWK
- Classification: Class I

History
- Opened: 27 December 1902

Services
Preceding station		Following station
Cibungur towards Cikarang	Walahar	Terminus
Location
- Location within Java

Purwakarta Station (PWK) (Sundanese: ᮞ᮪ᮒᮞᮤᮇᮔ᮪ ᮕᮥᮁᮝᮊᮁᮒ, romanized: Stasion Purwakarta) is a class I railway station located in Nagritengah, Purwakarta, Purwakarta Regency. The station, which is located at an altitude of +84 meters, is included in the Operational Area II Bandung. This station is located very close to the Purwakarta regent's office which can be reached on foot.

== History ==
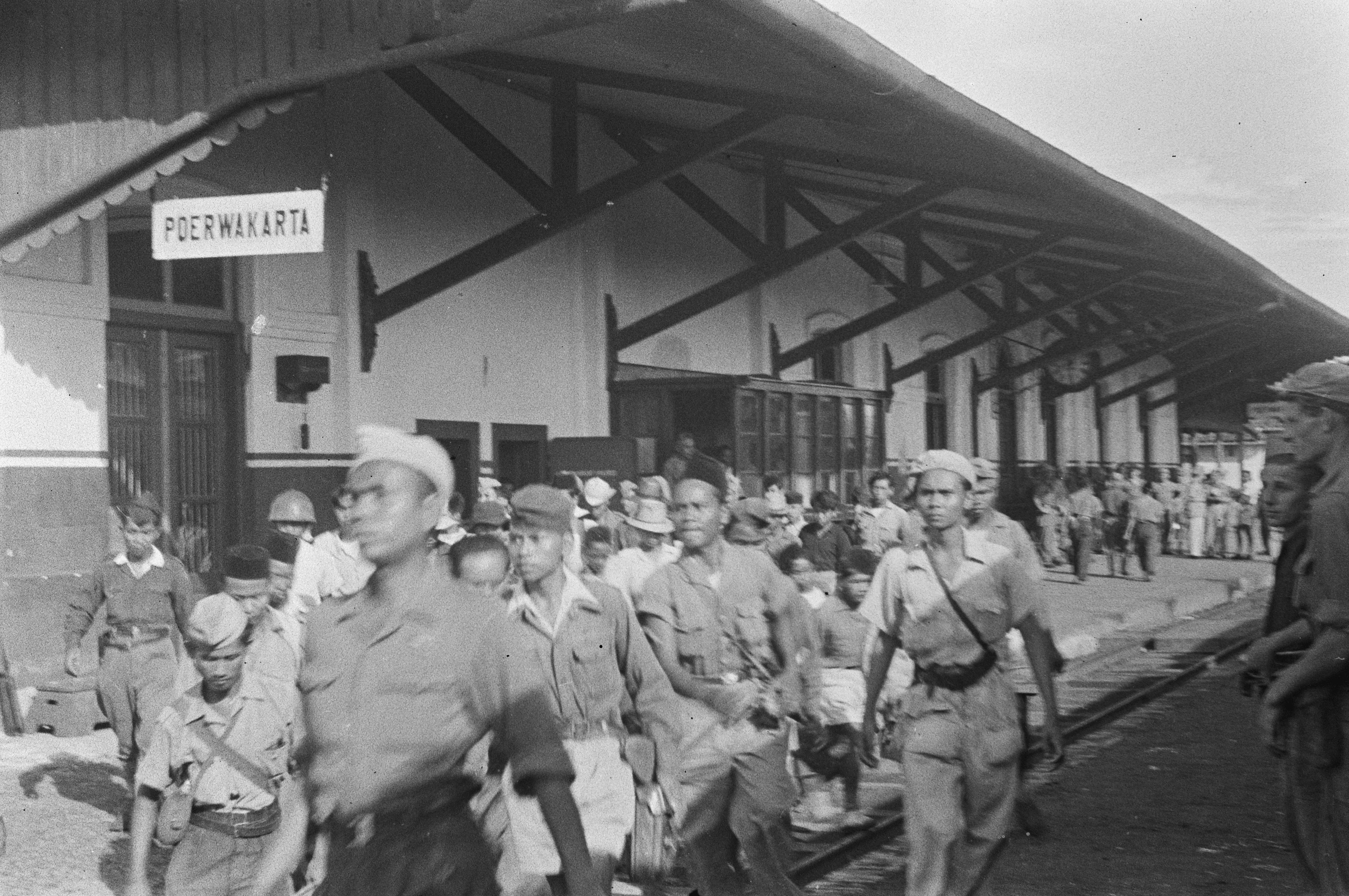
A group of TNI troops in Purwakarta Station, 10 February 1948

The Cikampek–Purwakarta railway segment was inaugurated on 27 December 1902, and arrived at Padalarang on 2 May 1906. Built by Staatsspoorwegen (SS), these lines were built to reduce the travel time for the Jakarta-Bandung train journey. SS relies heavily on this line for express trains. When compared to via Cianjur, SS built this route for service users who wanted to get to Bandung quickly.

The trains that run on the cross are named the Vlugge Vier ("Fast 4"), describing the reliability, ruggedness and speed of this train challenging the steep terrain on the track. This station is one of the changing points for the steam locomotive because of the transition from the steep, winding terrain to the flat terrain. Another locomotive change point is also at Padalarang Station.

In the past, there were branches leading to the Pertamina Depot and the Jatiluhur Dam, which were only used during construction. The branch is devoted to carrying the water turbine which is disembarked from the ship via Tanjung Priuk Station. Now, leaving only a small part, including bridges and level crossings. Now the line is abandoned.

== Building and layout ==
This station has six railway lines with line 1 being a straight double line from the direction of Jakarta and line 2 being a straight double line to Jakarta as well as a single line from and to Bandung. The partial double track was initiated in early 2002 and completed in 2004.

Until the mid-1980s, when the steam locomotive faded, Purwakarta Station was the place to change locomotives for trains from Jakarta to Bandung. The flat-cross locomotive which pulled the train from Jakarta was replaced with a mallet locomotive which is more suitable for mountainous areas. Therefore, Purwakarta Station is supported by a large enough locomotive depot even though the main station building is relatively small. The locomotive depot would not operate possibly after the mass abandonment of the steam locomotive. However, due to the plan to re-operate the depot, the depot building has been renovated.

This station is the "final resting place" for all non-AC economy electric trains that have operated across Jabodetabek since the abolition of non-AC EMUs on 25 July 2013. Here there are Rheostatic EMU, BN-Holec, and Hitachi. Not to forget, the rest of the carriages electric trains Tōyō Rapid 1000, Tokyo Metro 5000, diesel-hydraulic locomotives, and a series of conservation trains belonging to PT KAI were also sent here. A number of these abandoned EMUs were sold, bulldozed, or destroyed and later deleted from the list of facilities owned by PT KAI and PT KCI.

Other KRL service stations are at Cikaum Station, namely PT KAI's executive AC KRL which was imported or produced before 2009 and KRL owned by PT KAI and PT KCI which is not extended.

== Services ==
The following is a list of train services at the Purwakarta Station.

=== Passenger services ===
- Mixed class
  - Argo Parahyangan, to Gambir (executive argo–economy premium; only KA 43F).
  - Harina, to Bandung and to Surabaya Pasar Turi (executive–premium economy).
  - Ciremai, to Bandung and to Semarang Tawang (business–executive).
  - Pangandaran, to Gambir and Banjar (executive–premium economy).
- Economy class
  - Serayu, to Pasar Senen and to Kroya
- Local economy
  - G Garut Commuter Line, from and to Cibatu
  - Walahar/Purwakarta Commuter Line, from and to Cikarang
  - B Greater Bandung Commuter Line, from Cicalengka and to Kiaracondong.

Preceding station	Kereta Api Indonesia	Following station
Sadang towards Cikampek	Cikampek–Padalarang	Ciganea towards Padalarang
