= Batavian Eastern Railway Company =

Railway company in the Dutch East Indies

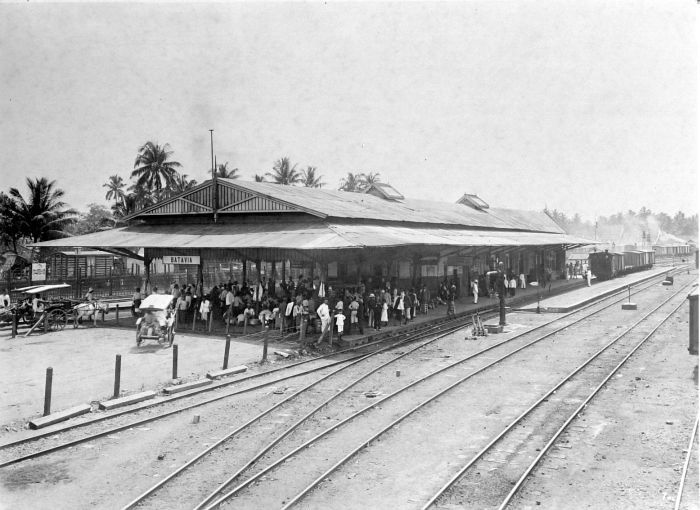
South Batavia Railway Station (early 20th century)

The Batavian Eastern Railway Company (Dutch: Bataviasche Oosterspoorweg Maatschapij), abbreviated as BOS, was a railway company in Batavia, Dutch East Indies. The railroad's 35-mile (56 km) route connected Batavia with Krawang via Meester Cornelis and Bekasi.

The Chinese-Indonesian author Tan Teng Kie wrote a syair poem about the construction of the railway line in the 1880s. In it, Tan talks in great detail about the organisation necessary for building the railway line, from the recruitment of coolies, to compensation paid out to local villagers, and on to the cooperation of local Landheeren (landlords), including Tan Kang Ie, the Luitenant der Chinezen of Bekasi at the time.

== See also ==
- Dutch East Indies Railway Company
