= 3200 class =

3200 class may refer to:

- ESS 3200 class, electric locomotives
- GWR 3200 Class, 4-4-0 steam locomotives
- Queensland Railways 3100/3200 class, electric locomotives
