= IE305 series =

Indonesian electric multiple unit train type

iE305 series CLI-225/CLI-226 series
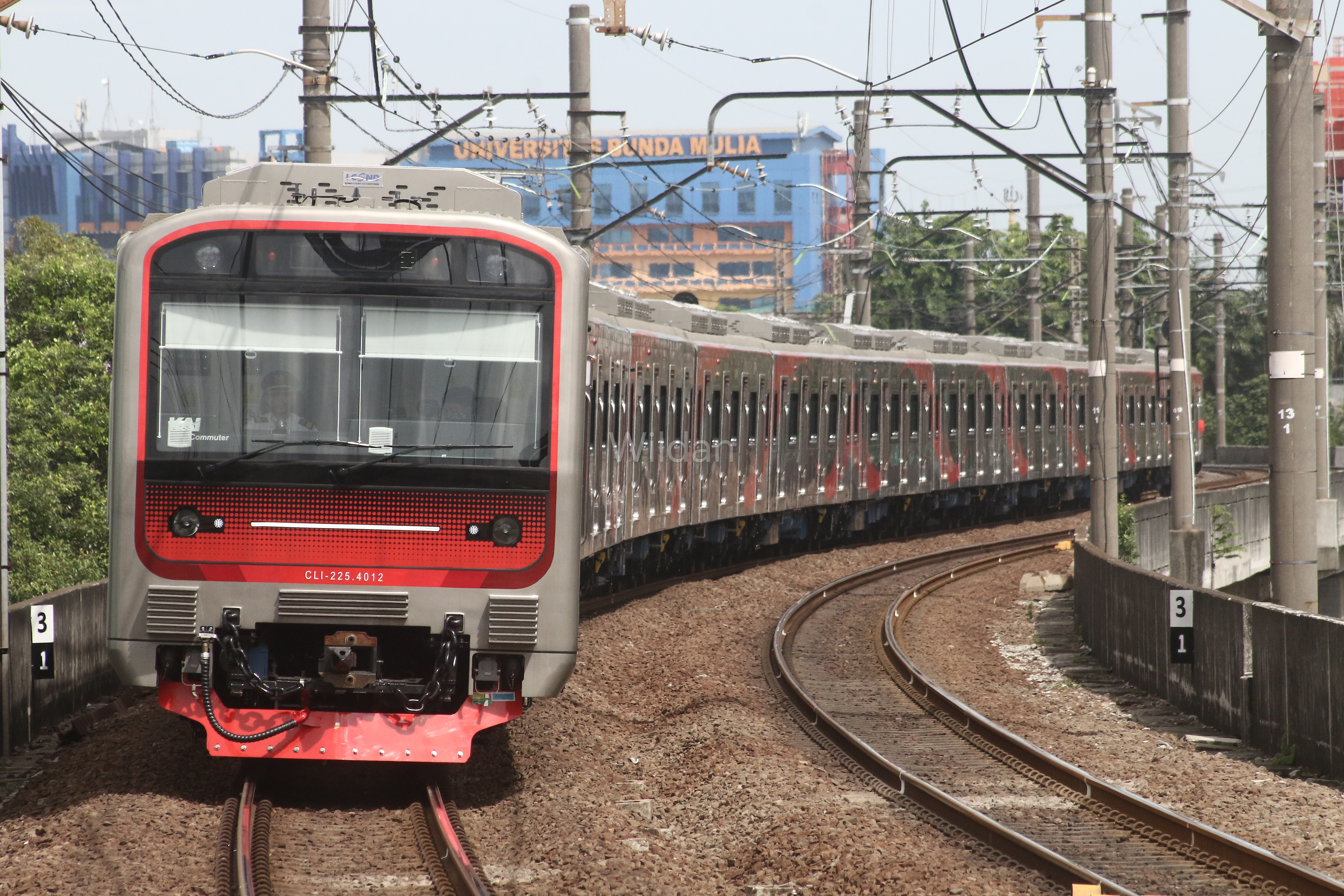
- iE305 series 4th Trainset (CLI-225.4001F) entering Jayakarta station.
- Stock type: Electric Multiple Unit
- In service: 2025–present
- Manufacturer: Industri Kereta Api
- Built at: Madiun and Banyuwangi, Indonesia
- Replaced: Tokyu 8000 series; Tokyu 8500 series; Tokyo Metro 6000 series; Tokyo Metro 7000 series; 203 series
- Constructed: 2024–present
- Entered service: 16 December 2025; 10 months ago
- Number under construction: 108 vehicles (9 sets)
- Number built: 84 vehicles (7 sets)
- Formation: 12 cars per trainset
- Operator: KAI Commuter
- Depot: Depok (DP)
- Lines served: KRL Commuter Line: KAI Commuter Bogor Line; KAI Commuter Cikarang Loop Line

Specifications
- Car body construction: Stainless steel
- Car length: 20,000 mm (65 ft 7 in)
- Width: 3,000 mm (9 ft 10 in)
- Height: 3,985 mm (13 ft 0.9 in)
- Doors: 4 doors on each side
- Maximum speed: 120 km/h (75 mph)
- Traction system: Toyo Denki RG6061-A-M VVVF-IGBT
- Power output: 4000 hp
- HVAC: INKA I-Cond ACI 3501 (2 units per car)
- Electric systems: 1,500 V DC overhead catenary
- Current collection: Toyo Denki PT7206-A Pantograph
- Bogies: INKA TB1622 (Trailer), INKA MB1122 (Motor)
- Braking system: Regenerative brake
- Coupling system: Shibata Coupling
- Track gauge: 1,067 mm (3 ft 6 in)

The iE305 series, also known as CLI-225/CLI-226 series, is an electric multiple unit (EMU) commuter train type operated by KAI Commuter. This EMU is designed and manufactured by Industri Kereta Api (INKA) in Madiun and Banyuwangi, East Java, in collaboration with Japan Transport Engineering Company (J-TREC). This EMU uses technical specifications determined by the Directorate General of Railways (DJKA) of the Indonesian Ministry of Transportation.

This EMU utilizes components sourced from both domestic and foreign production. In the electrical and equipment section, it uses components produced by Toyo Denki Seizo. As for the braking system, it uses components produced by Nabtesco.

The iE305 series has a formation of 12 cars on each trainset.

== History ==
KAI Commuter and PT INKA signed a contract on 9 March 2023 for the production of 16 trainsets, totaling 192 units of the iE305 series. The contract is valued at approximately Rp3.83 trillion (estimated at $251.27 million based on the 2023 exchange rate), which means each trainset is valued at $15.70 million. The delivery of the entire iE305 series will be carried out in stages from 2025 to 2027.

The first trainset of the iE305 series was completed in early 2025. From 10 March to 12 March 2025, initial testing was conducted at the INKA factory in Madiun.

On 17 March 2025, the first trainset of the iE305 series was delivered from the INKA factory in Madiun to the Solo Jebres EMU Depot. Just a day before on 16 March 2025, the EMU was for the first time went outside the factory area and was exhibited to journalists at Madiun Station. The Solo Jebres EMU Depot is a EMU Depot owned by the DJKA Railway Maintenance Center and managed by KAI Commuter.

The delivery of each trainset is carried out in two phases, with each phase comprising six cars, pulled by a locomotive that is accompanied by several unmanned passenger cars to aid in braking.

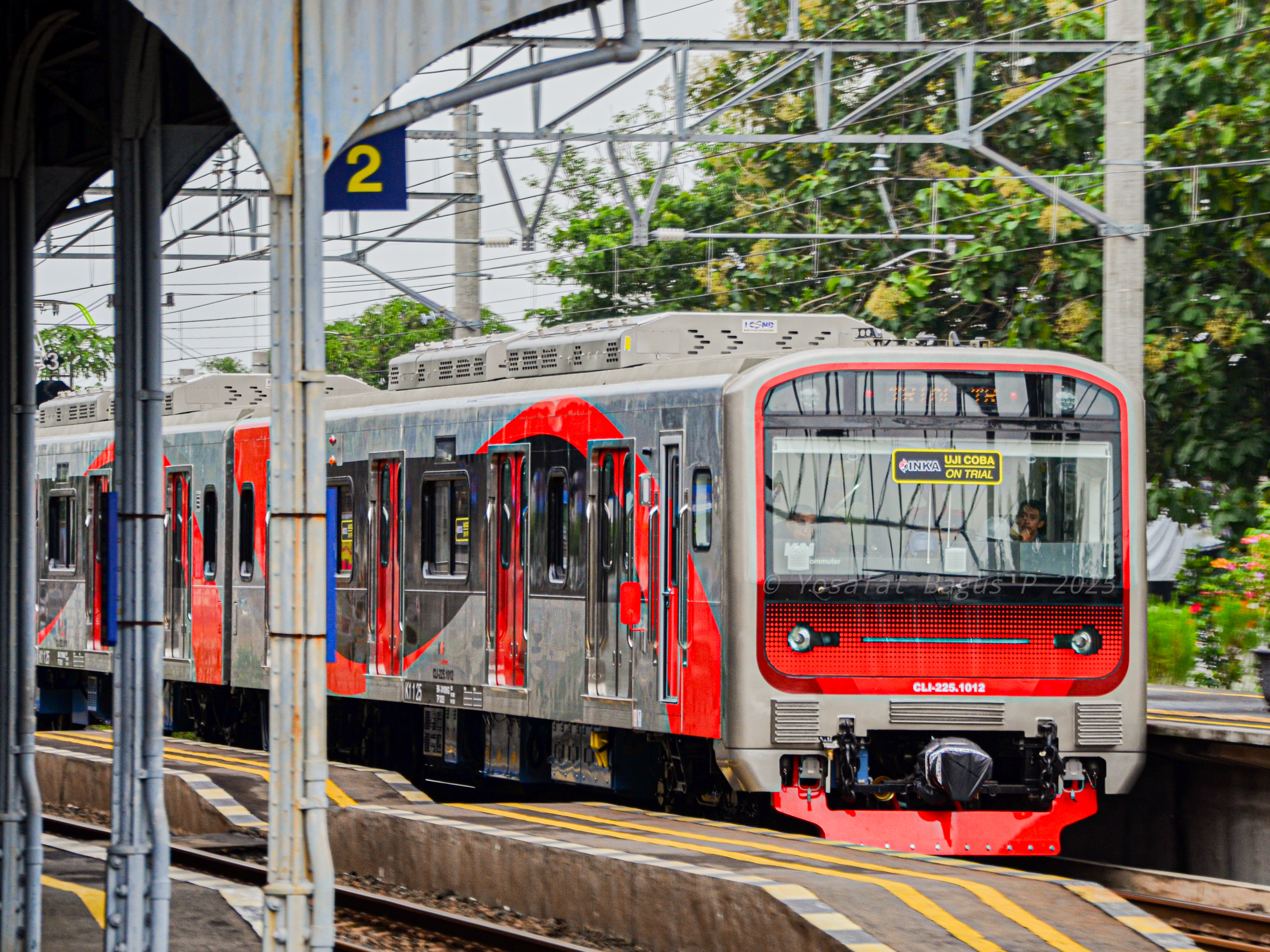
iE305 series conducted a test run on the Yogyakarta Line passing Delanggu station.

In the afternoon of 18 March 2025, the EMU underwent a short test run around Solo Jebres station. This short test run was carried out for the train driver to adapt to the train controls.

In the early hours of 19 March 2025, the iE305 series for the first time underwent a full speed test at 120 km per hour on the Solo Jebres-Lempuyangan section of the Yogyakarta Line. Later in the afternoon, the test run continued on the Solo Jebres-Klaten section. The test run was carried out by INKA, KAI Commuter and PT Surveyor Indonesia as consultants.

On 16 April 2025, the first trainset continued its delivery from Solo Jebres Depot to Depok EMU Depot via Purwokerto, following the trial run on the Yogyakarta Line.

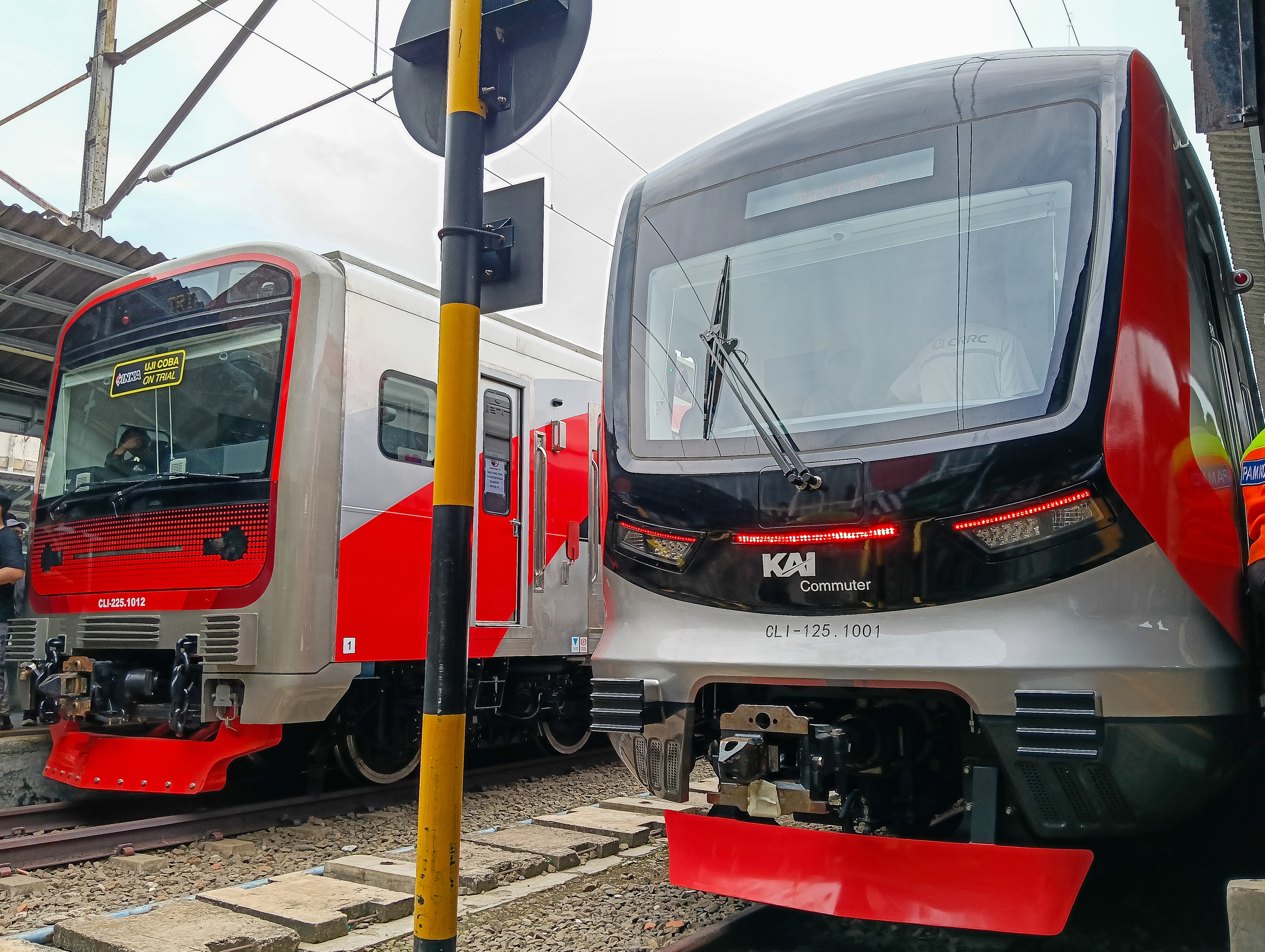
iE305 series (CLI-225 series) and SFC120-V series (CLI-125 series) on exhibit during an event commemorating the 100th anniversary of the first railway electrification in Indonesia.

On 21 April 2025, along with the SFC120-V series, the iE305 series was sent from Depok EMU Depot to Manggarai Station in preparation for the event commemorating the 100th anniversary of the first railway electrification in Indonesia on the next day. On 22 April 2025, the iE305 series was exhibited at Jakarta Kota Station, alongside the ESS 3200 class, SFC120-V series and various other EMUs.

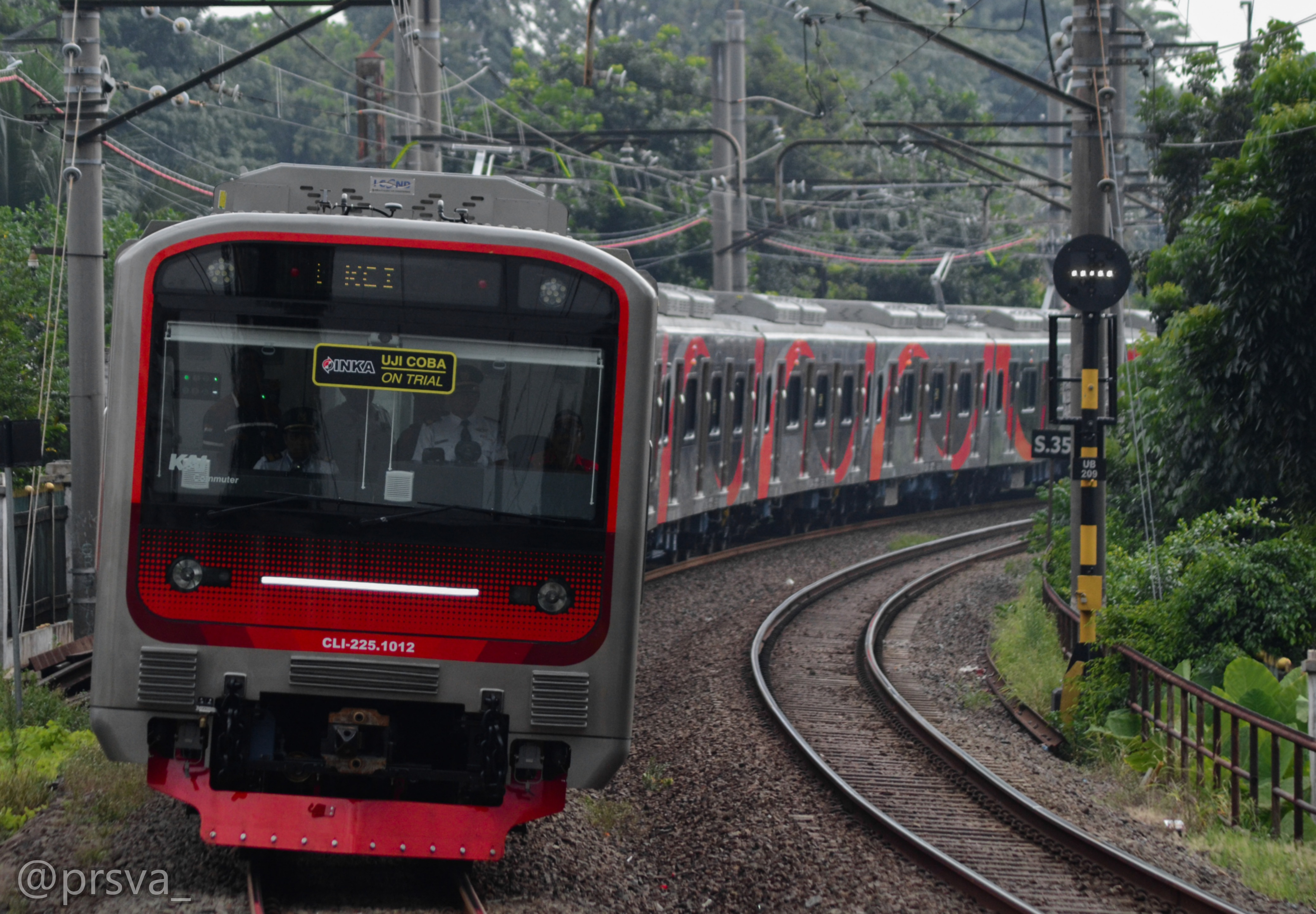
CLI-225 series (iE305 series) entering Lenteng Agung station

After previously being exhibited, the first trainset of the iE305 series resumed its trial run in Jabodetabek. The trial run began on the Bogor Line on Sunday night, 27 April 2025. The trial was conducted by KAI Commuter together with Toyo Denki Seizo and Nabtesco.

These trials follow the guidelines of the Ministry of Transportation Number 49 of 2023 concerning Standards, Test Procedures, and Certification of the Feasibility of Normal Speed Trains with Self-Driving. The tests consist of Design and Engineering Tests, Static Tests and Dynamics Tests.

On 16 December 2025, the first and second trainsets of the iE305 series officially entered service, with a public trial run carrying passengers on the Bogor Line.

From 7 to 30 September 2026, all of the trainsets are suspended from regular service due to maintenance needed following two derailment incidents on 4 September 2026.

== Design Features ==
=== Exterior ===
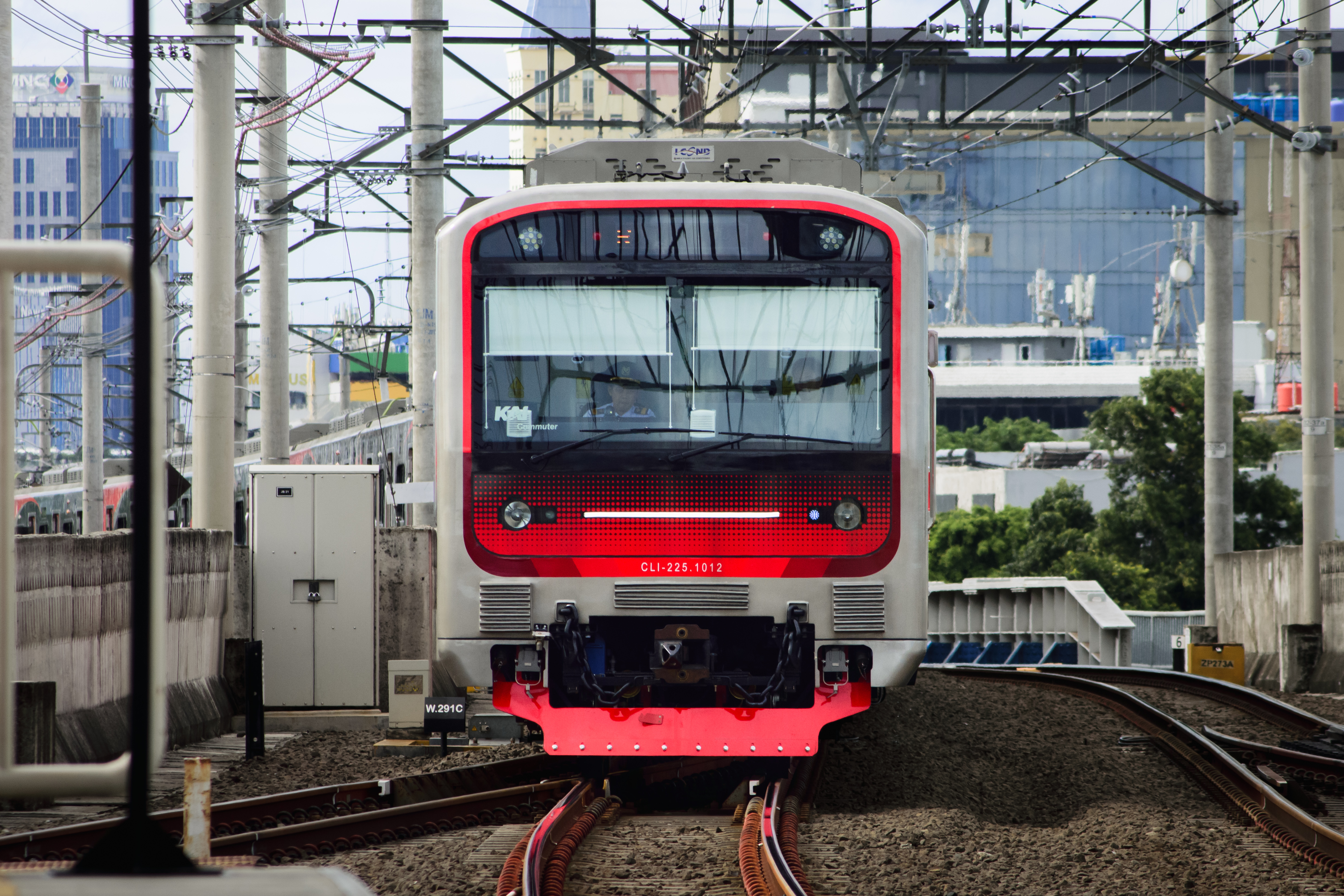
The front of the iE305 series

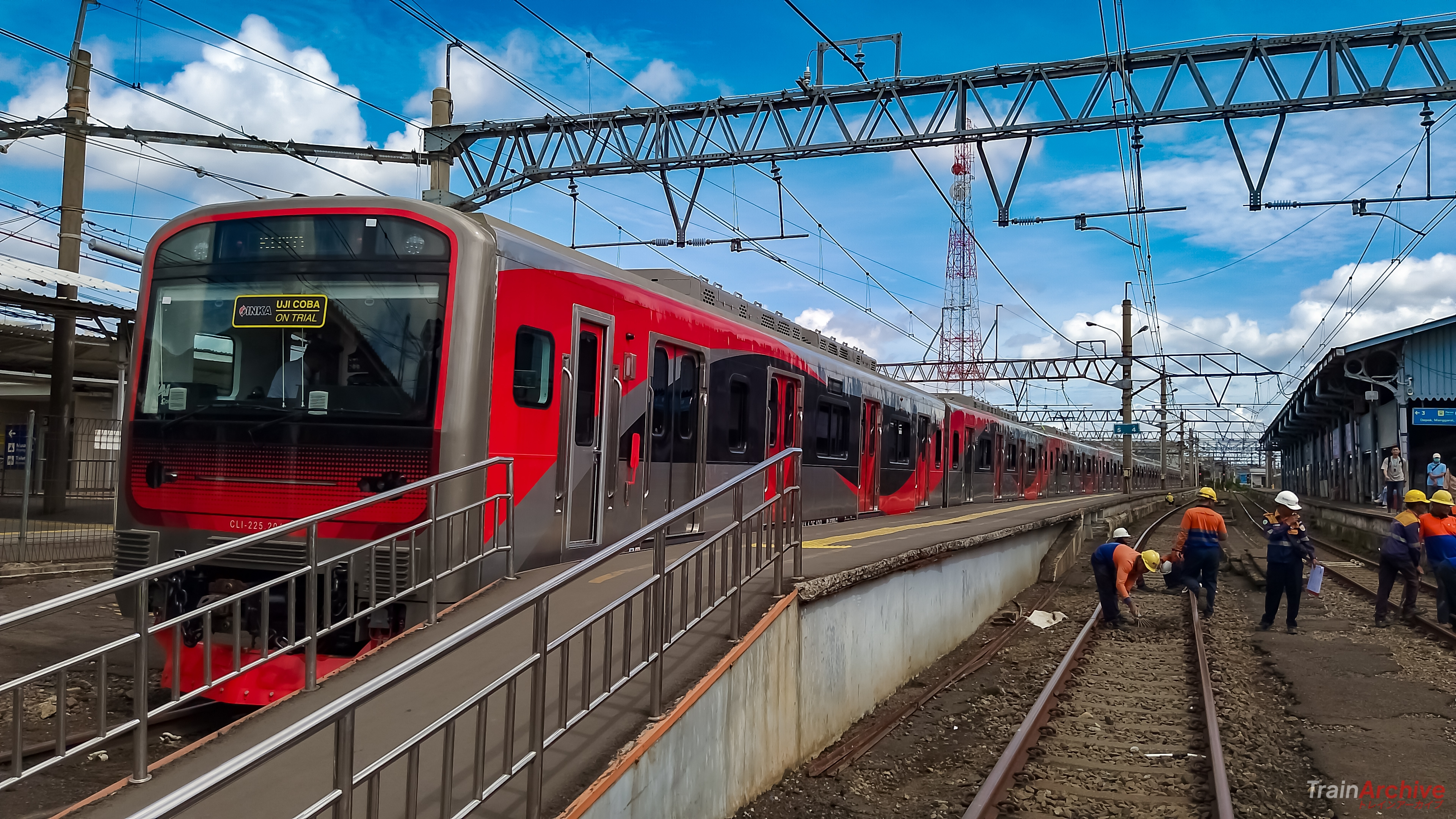
Wave pattern livery on the side of the EMU body

The exterior design of this EMU has similar design with the E235 series, featuring a rounded-square body profile and a wider driver’s cab windshield compared to earlier EMU models. The lower front section of the driver’s cab is decorated with red dot gradient pattern inspired by the design of the E235 series. Additionally, the sides of the EMU are finished with a wave-pattern livery in a red, gray, and black color scheme that extends continuously from the first to the last car, which KAI Commuter refers it as "Gelombang Ombak" (The Wave).

=== Interior ===
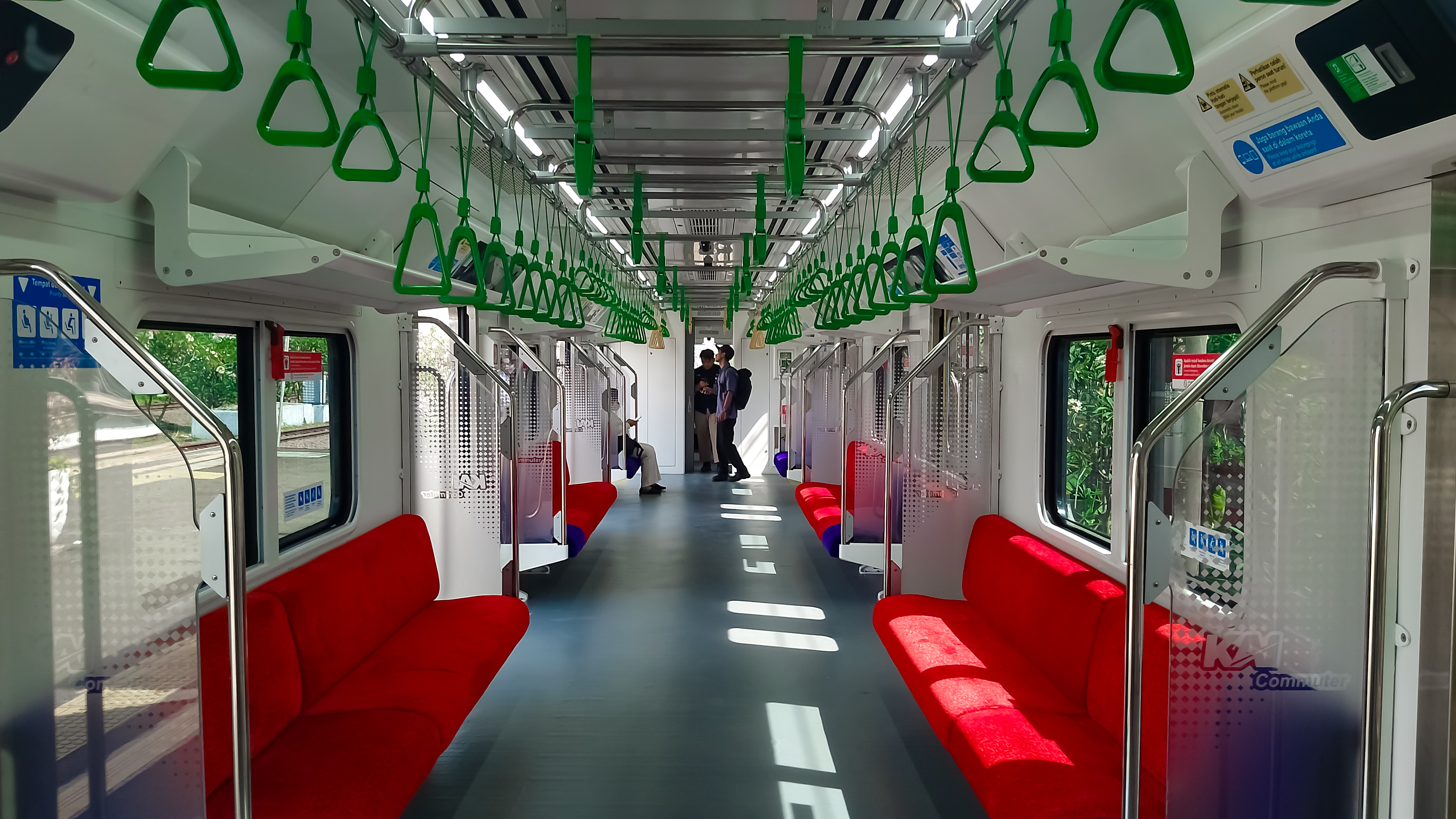
Full interior of the iE305 series

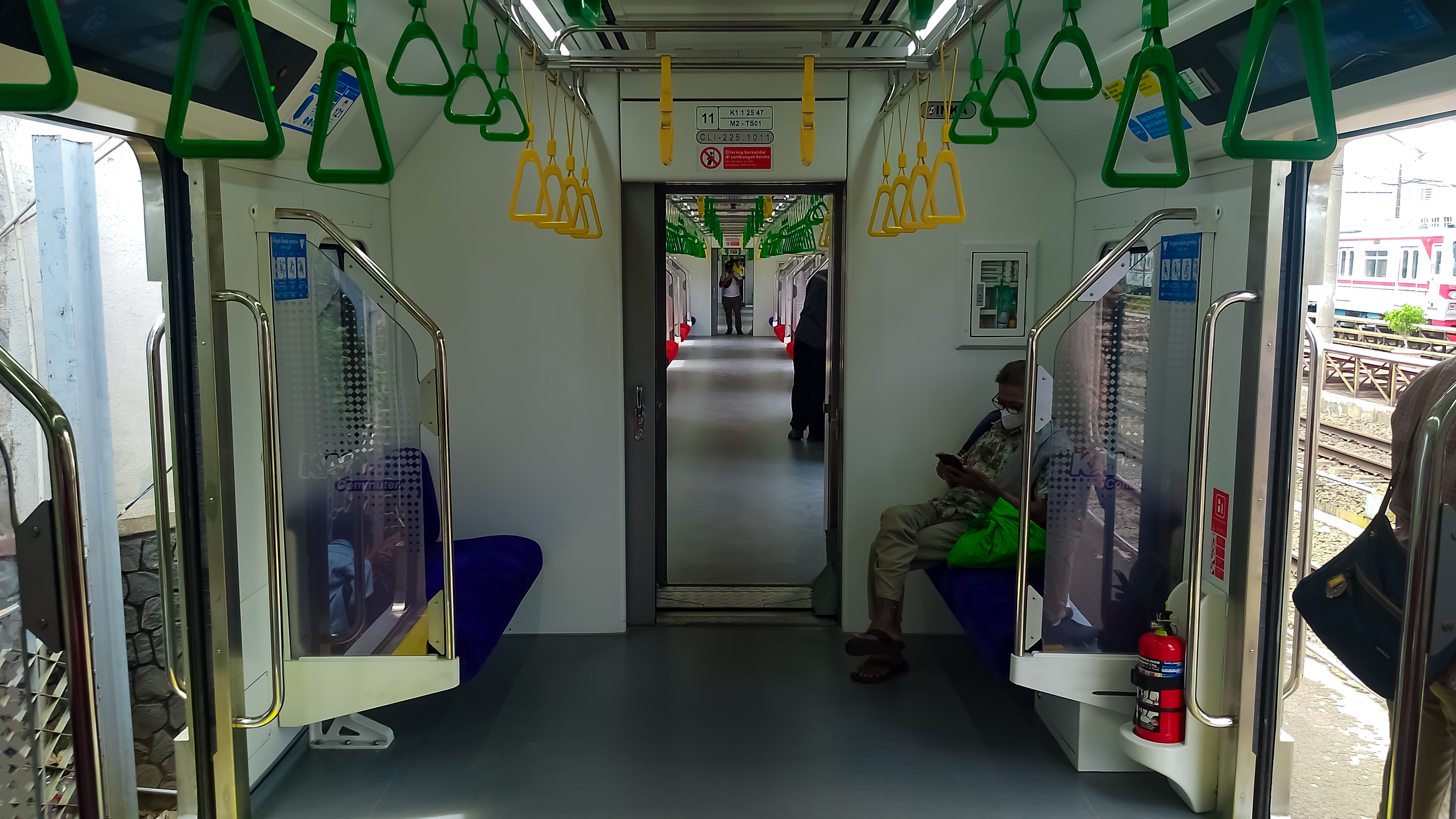
Priority seat

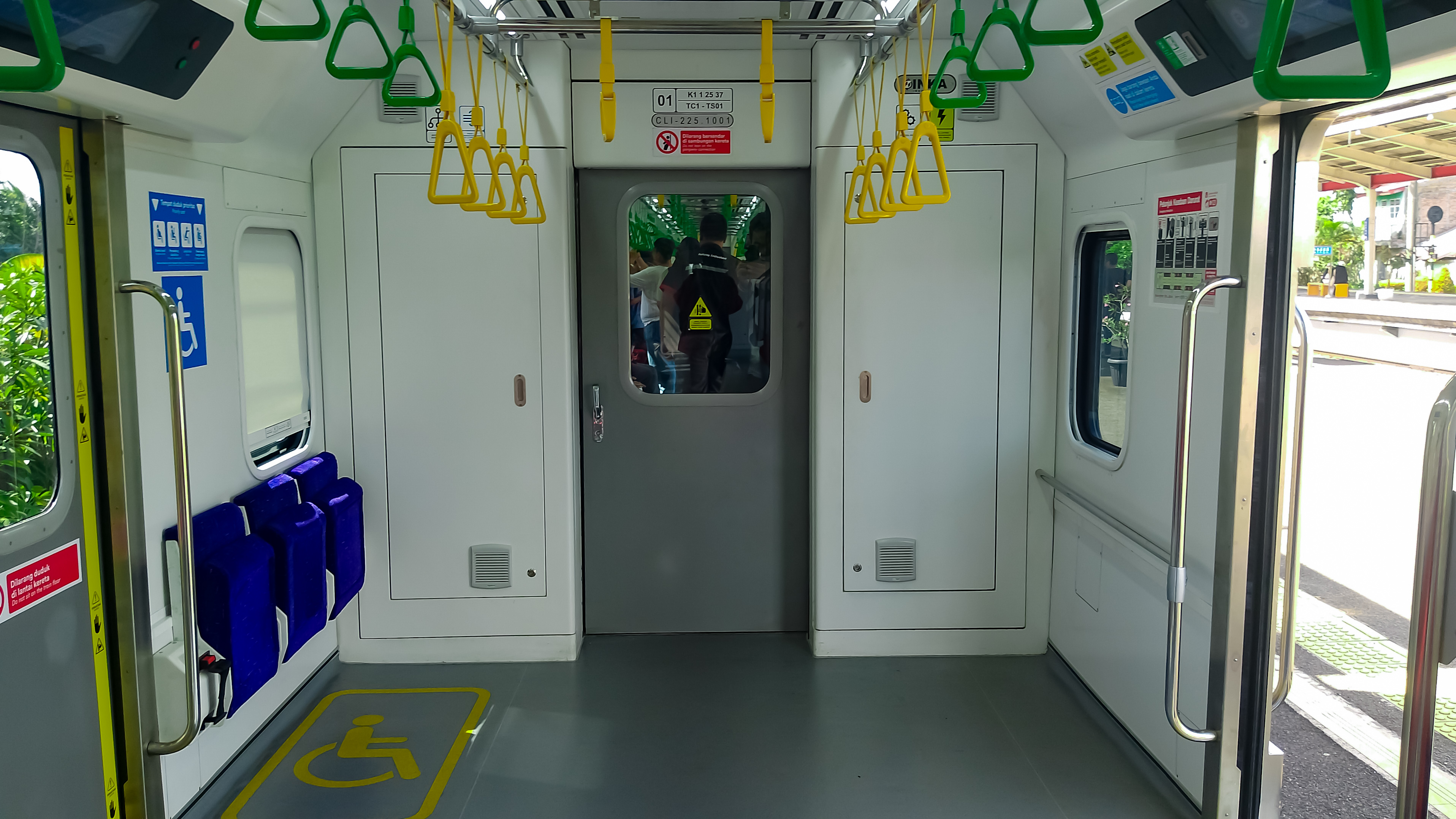
Foldable priority seats and the wheelchair or stroller space

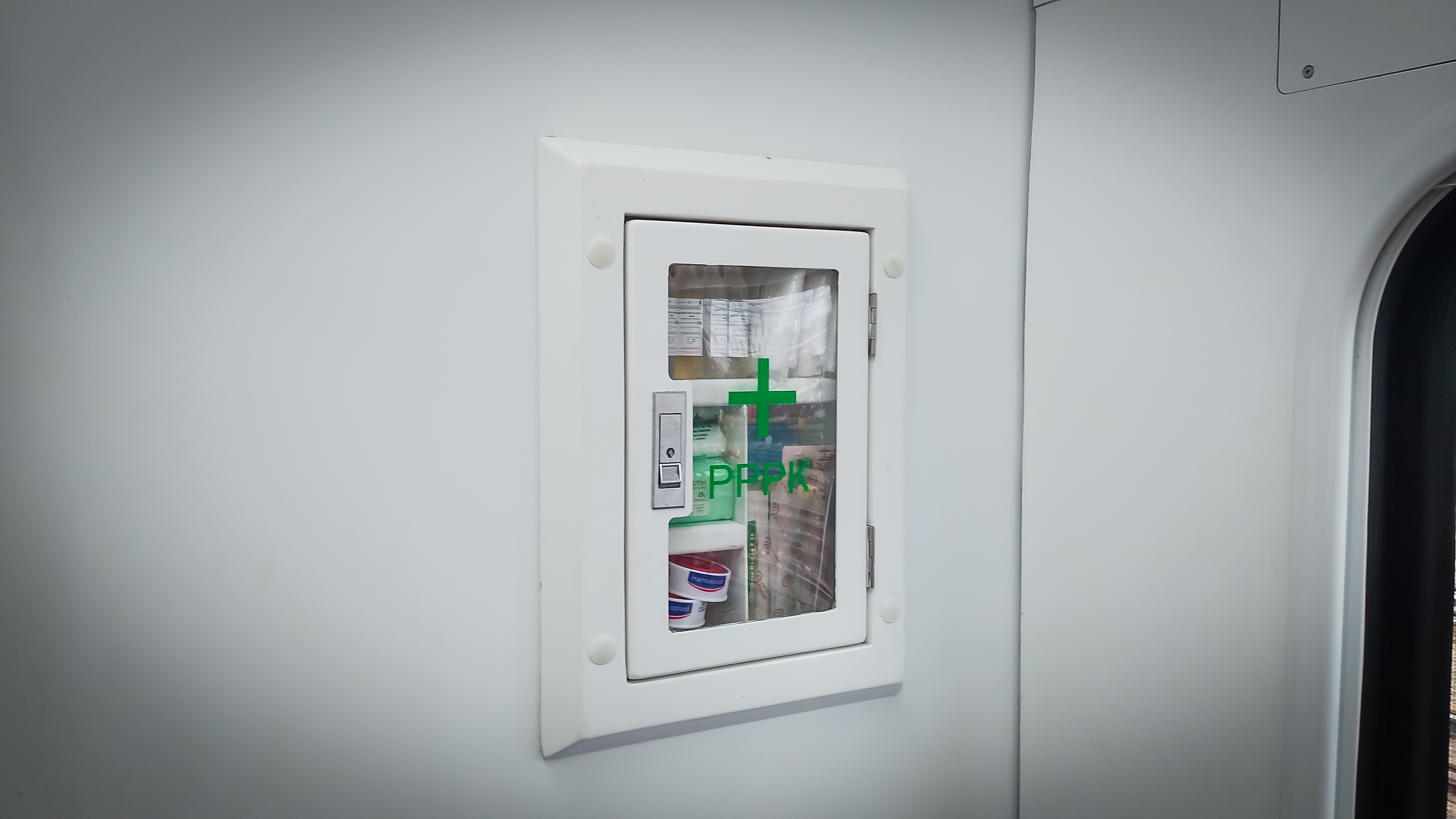
First aid kit inside the EMU

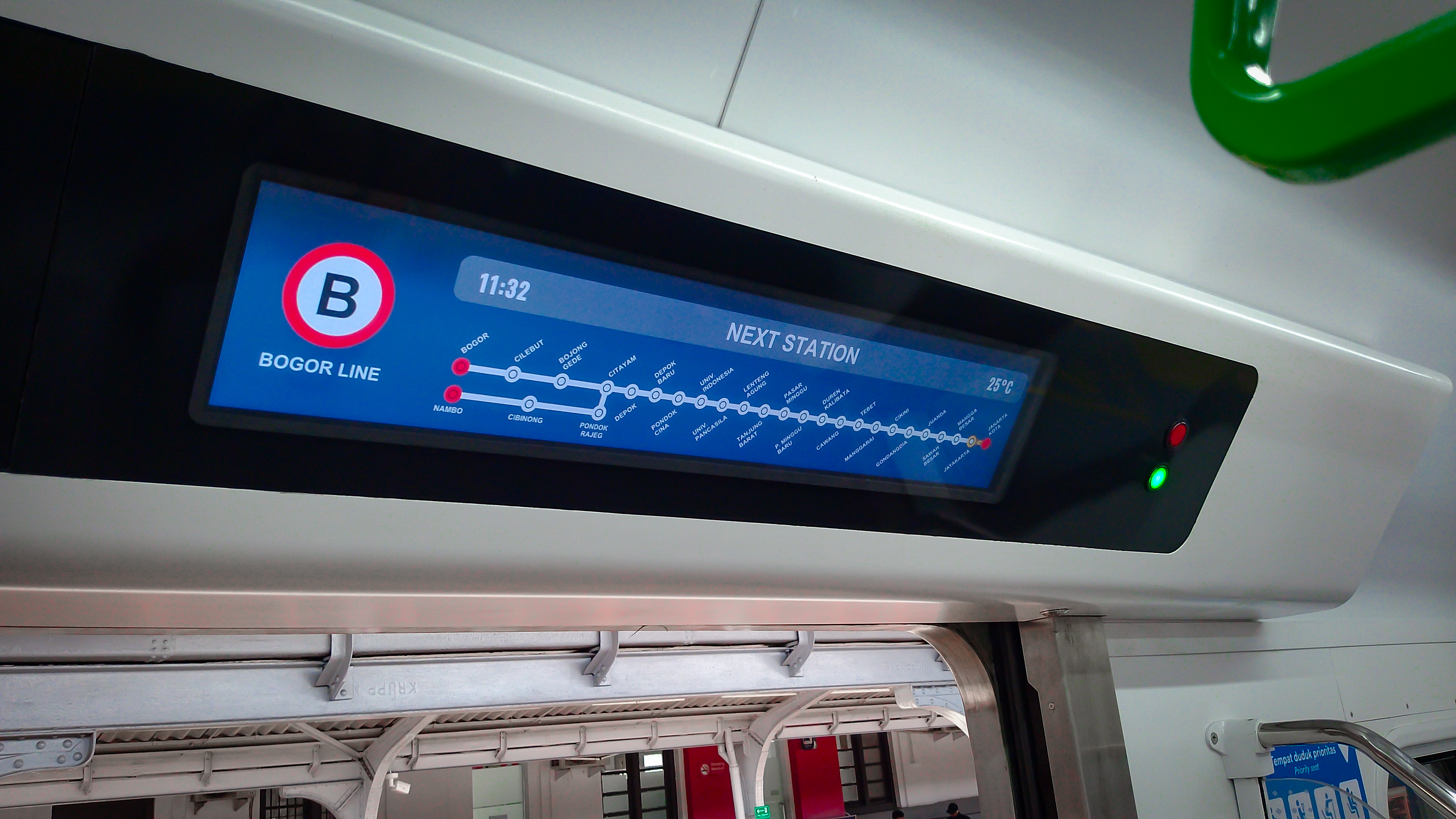
Passenger information display

The interior of the iE305 series is equipped with dark blue priority seating, a passenger information display (PIDS) above the automatic doors, surveillance cameras, overhead luggage racks located above the passenger windows, and a free space for wheelchair users and baby stroller. In addition, door chimes are installed, which sound when the doors are opened and closed.

== Formations ==
Each trainset in the iE305 series comprises 12 cars. This configuration features two driver cabins situated in the first car and the twelfth car (the final car). These two cars are non-motorized and are classified as trailer cars with driver cabins (Tc).

Meanwhile, the other trains are divided into several types, namely:

- M1 and M2: Motor cars.
- T1, T2, and T3: Trailer cars.

In general, the standard formation configuration of the iE305 series is arranged as follows:

	Train Formation											
Car number	1	2	3	4	5	6	7	8	9	10	11	12
Numbering	CLI-225.X001	CLI-225.X002	CLI-225.X003	CLI-225.X004	CLI-225.X005	CLI-225.X006	CLI-225.X007	CLI-225.X008	CLI-225.X009	CLI-225.X010	CLI-225.X011	CLI-225.X012
Designation	Tc1	M1	M2	T1	T2	M1	M2	T3	T1	M1	M2	Tc2
Weight (kg)	34.100	37.600	37.100	33.000	30.100	37.600	37.100	29.600	33.000	37.600	37.100	34.100

== Formation List ==
	Train Formation											
Car number	1	2	3	4	5	6	7	8	9	10	11	12
Designation	Tc1	M1	M2	T1	T2	M1	M2	T3	T1	M1	M2	Tc2
CLI-225.1001F	CLI-225.1001; K1 1 25 37	CLI-225.1002; K1 1 25 38	CLI-225.1003; K1 1 25 39	CLI-225.1004; K1 1 25 40	CLI-225.1005; K1 1 25 41	CLI-225.1006; K1 1 25 42	CLI-225.1007; K1 1 25 43	CLI-225.1008; K1 1 25 44	CLI-225.1009; K1 1 25 45	CLI-225.1010; K1 1 25 46	CLI-225.1011; K1 1 25 47	CLI-225.1012; K1 1 25 48
CLI-225.2001F	CLI-225.2001; K1 1 25 97	CLI-225.2002; K1 1 25 98	CLI-225.2003; K1 1 25 99	CLI-225.2004; K1 1 25 100	CLI-225.2005; K1 1 25 101	CLI-225.2006; K1 1 25 102	CLI-225.2007; K1 1 25 103	CLI-225.2008; K1 1 25 104	CLI-225.2009; K1 1 25 105	CLI-225.2010; K1 1 25 106	CLI-225.2011; K1 1 25 107	CLI-225.2012; K1 1 25 108
CLI-225.3001F	CLI-225.3001; K1 1 25 157	CLI-225.3002; K1 1 25 158	CLI-225.3003; K1 1 25 159	CLI-225.3004; K1 1 25 160	CLI-225.3005; K1 1 25 161	CLI-225.3006; K1 1 25 162	CLI-225.3007; K1 1 25 163	CLI-225.3008; K1 1 25 164	CLI-225.3009; K1 1 25 165	CLI-225.3010; K1 1 25 166	CLI-225.3011; K1 1 25 167	CLI-225.3012; K1 1 25 168
CLI-225.4001F	CLI-225.4001; K1 1 25 169	CLI-225.4002; K1 1 25 170	CLI-225.4003; K1 1 25 171	CLI-225.4004; K1 1 25 172	CLI-225.4005; K1 1 25 173	CLI-225.4006; K1 1 25 174	CLI-225.4007; K1 1 25 175	CLI-225.4008; K1 1 25 176	CLI-225.4009; K1 1 25 177	CLI-225.4010; K1 1 25 178	CLI-225.4011; K1 1 25 179	CLI-225.4012; K1 1 25 180
CLI-225.5001F	CLI-225.5001; K1 1 25 181	CLI-225.5002; K1 1 25 182	CLI-225.5003; K1 1 25 183	CLI-225.5004; K1 1 25 184	CLI-225.5005; K1 1 25 185	CLI-225.5006; K1 1 25 186	CLI-225.5007; K1 1 25 187	CLI-225.5008; K1 1 25 188	CLI-225.5009; K1 1 25 189	CLI-225.5010; K1 1 25 190	CLI-225.5011; K1 1 25 191	CLI-225.5012; K1 1 25 192
CLI-225.6001F	CLI-225.6001; K1 1 25 193	CLI-225.6002; K1 1 25 194	CLI-225.6003; K1 1 25 135	CLI-225.6004; K1 1 25 196	CLI-225.6005; K1 1 25 197	CLI-225.6006; K1 1 25 198	CLI-225.6007; K1 1 25 199	CLI-225.6008; K1 1 25 200	CLI-225.6009; K1 1 25 201	CLI-225.6010; K1 1 25 202	CLI-225.6011; K1 1 25 203	CLI-225.6012; K1 1 25 204
CLI-226.7001F	CLI-226.7001; K1 1 26 01	CLI-226.7002; K1 1 26 02	CLI-226.7003; K1 1 26 03	CLI-226.7004; K1 1 26 04	CLI-226.7005; K1 1 26 05	CLI-226.7006; K1 1 26 06	CLI-226.7007; K1 1 26 07	CLI-226.7008; K1 1 26 08	CLI-226.7009; K1 1 26 09	CLI-226.7010; K1 1 26 10	CLI-226.7011; K1 1 26 11	CLI-226.7012; K1 1 26 12

== Gallery ==
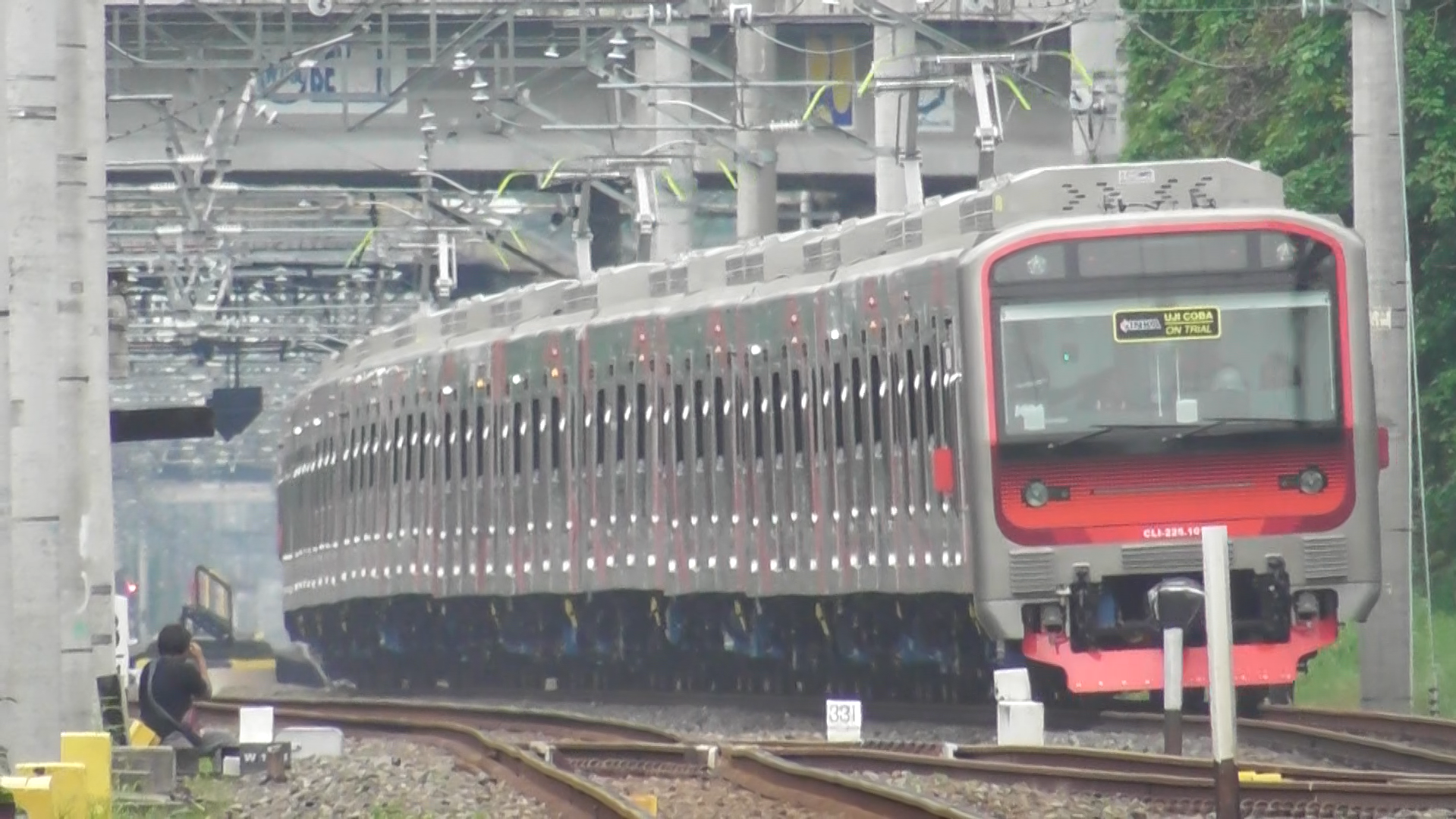
iE305 series during trial run on the Yogyakarta Line.

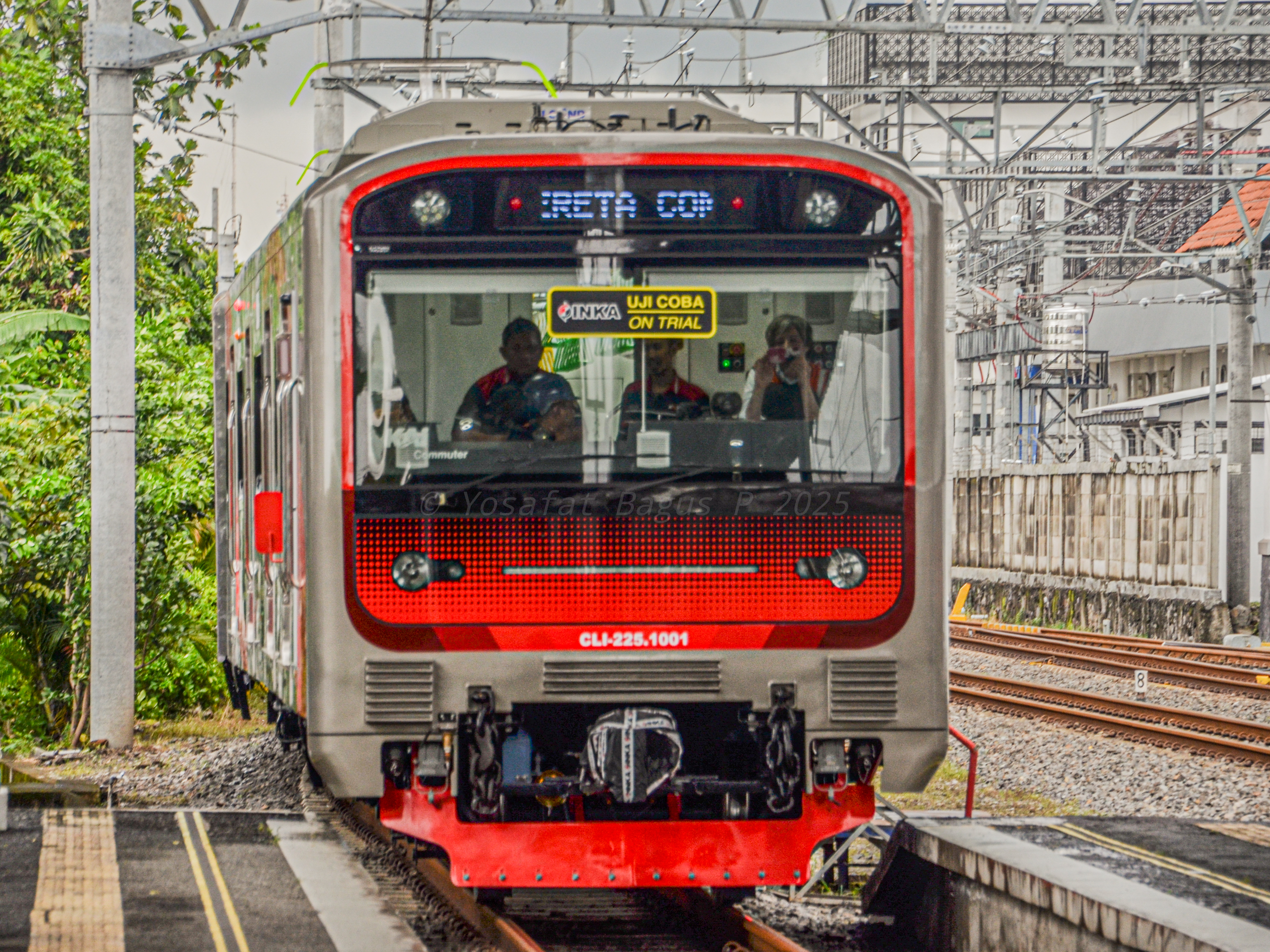
iE305 series EMU departing from Solo Jebres station.

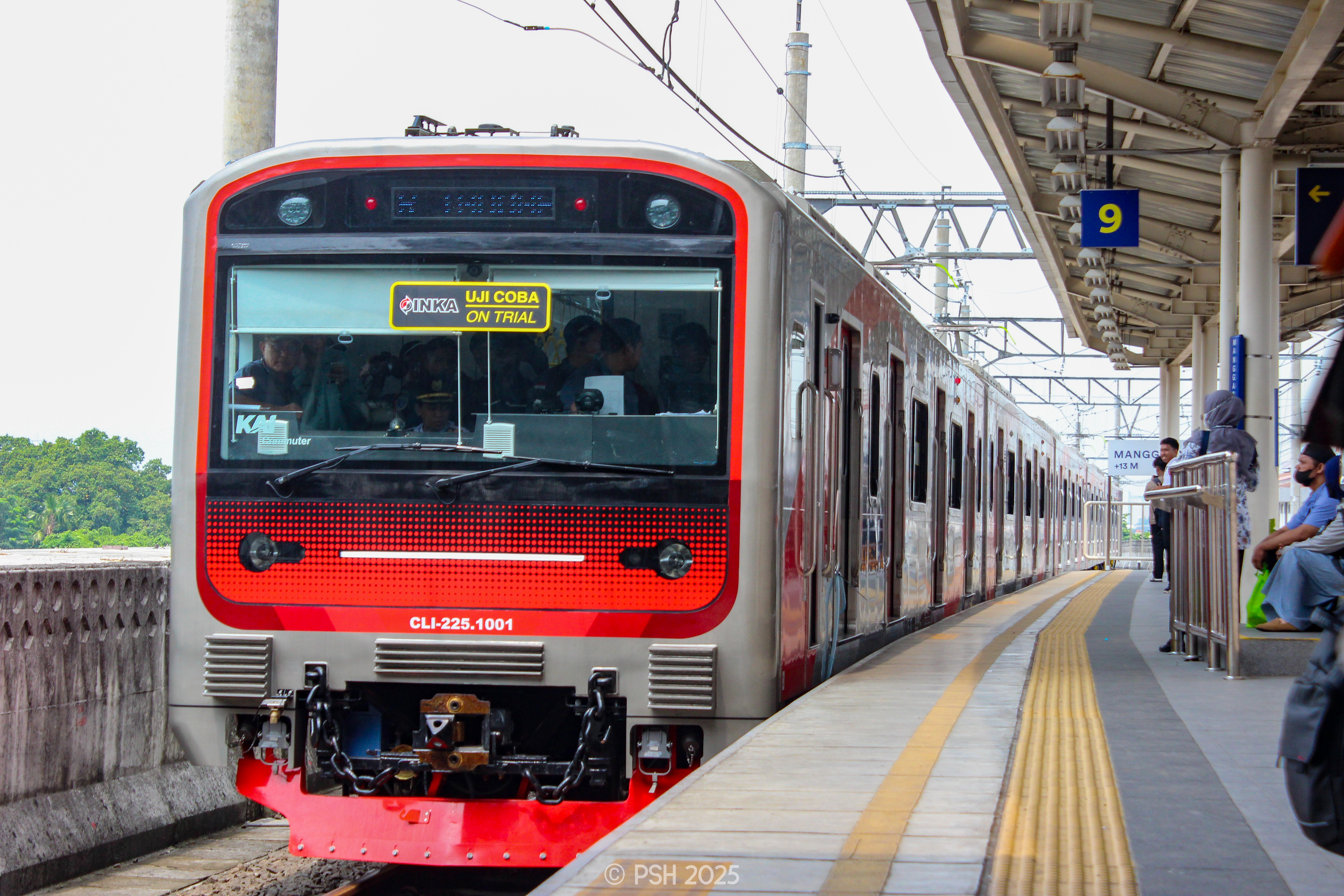
iE305 series conducting a load test entering track 9 of Manggarai Station

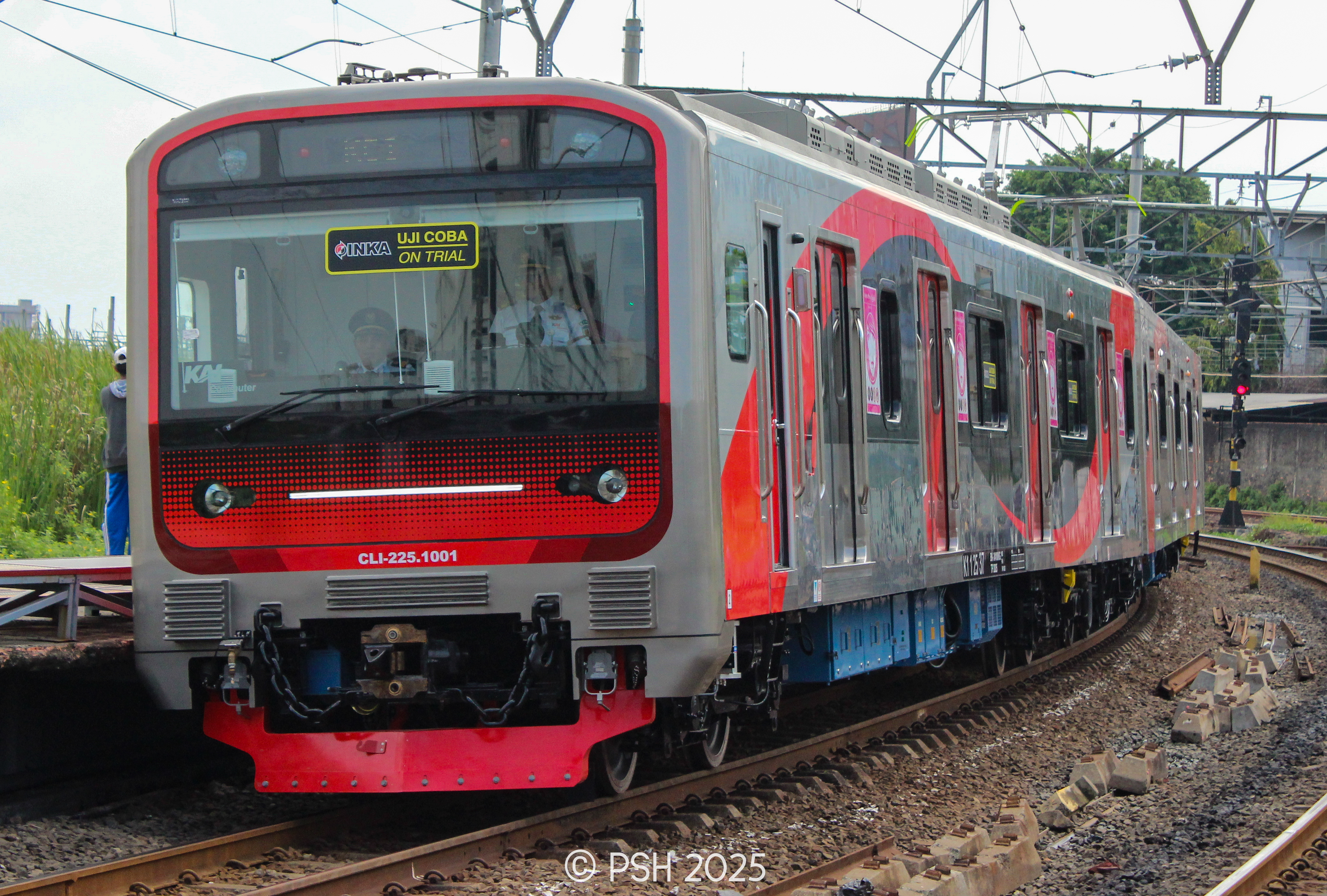
iE305 series entering track 5 Kampung Bandan station.

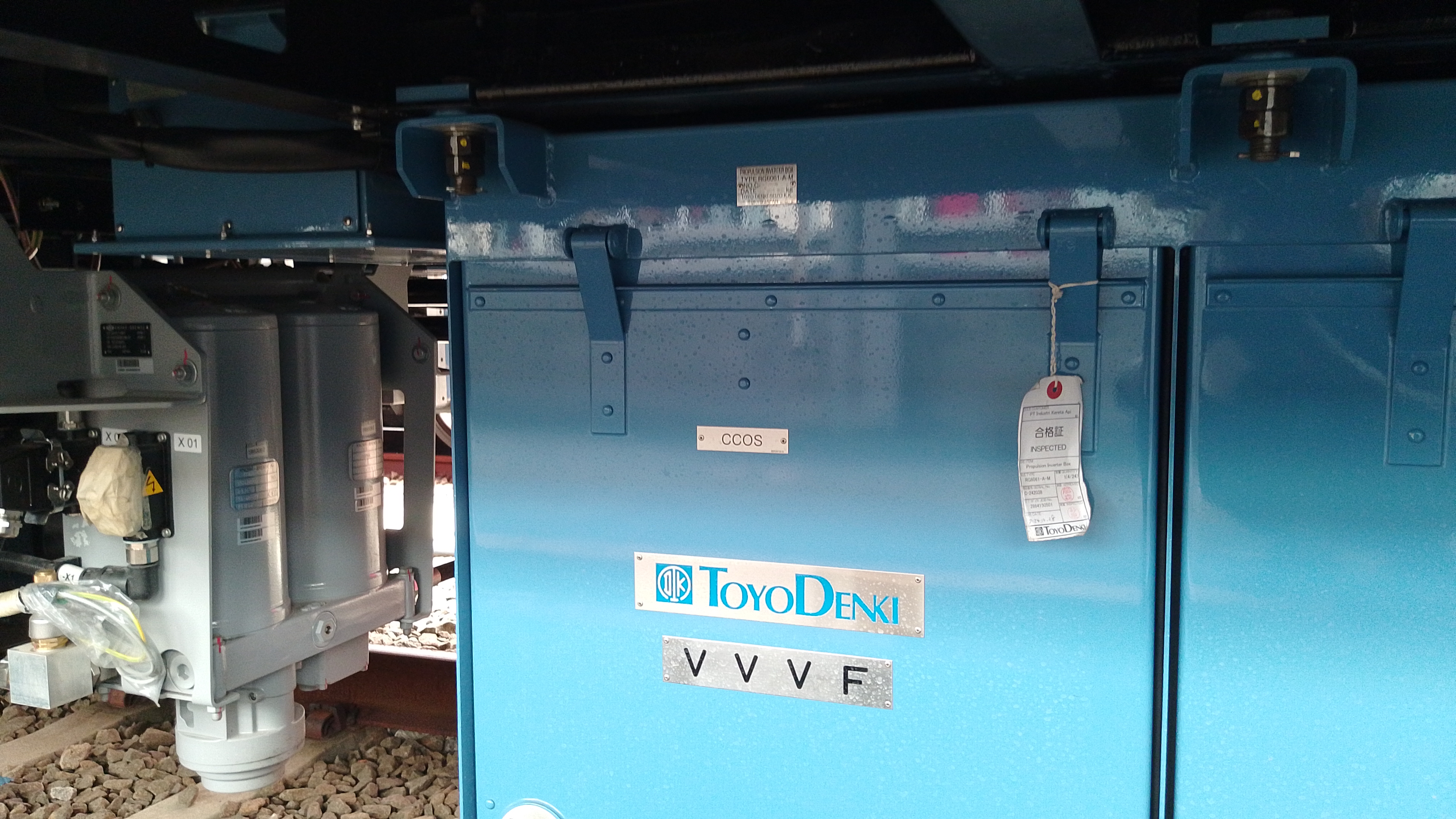
A RG6061-A-M type propulsion inverter made by Toyo Denki Seizo.

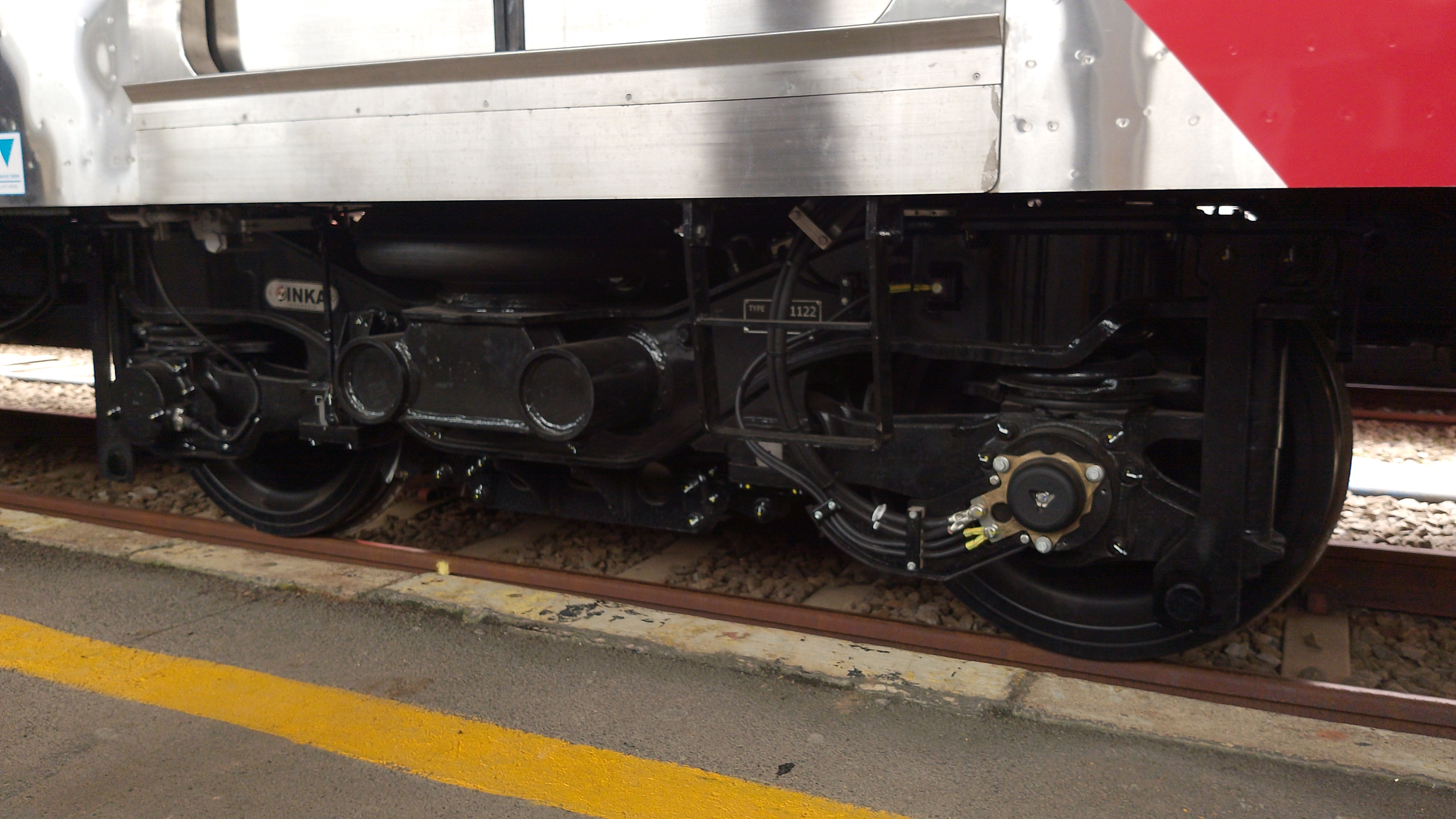
A MB1122 motor bogie

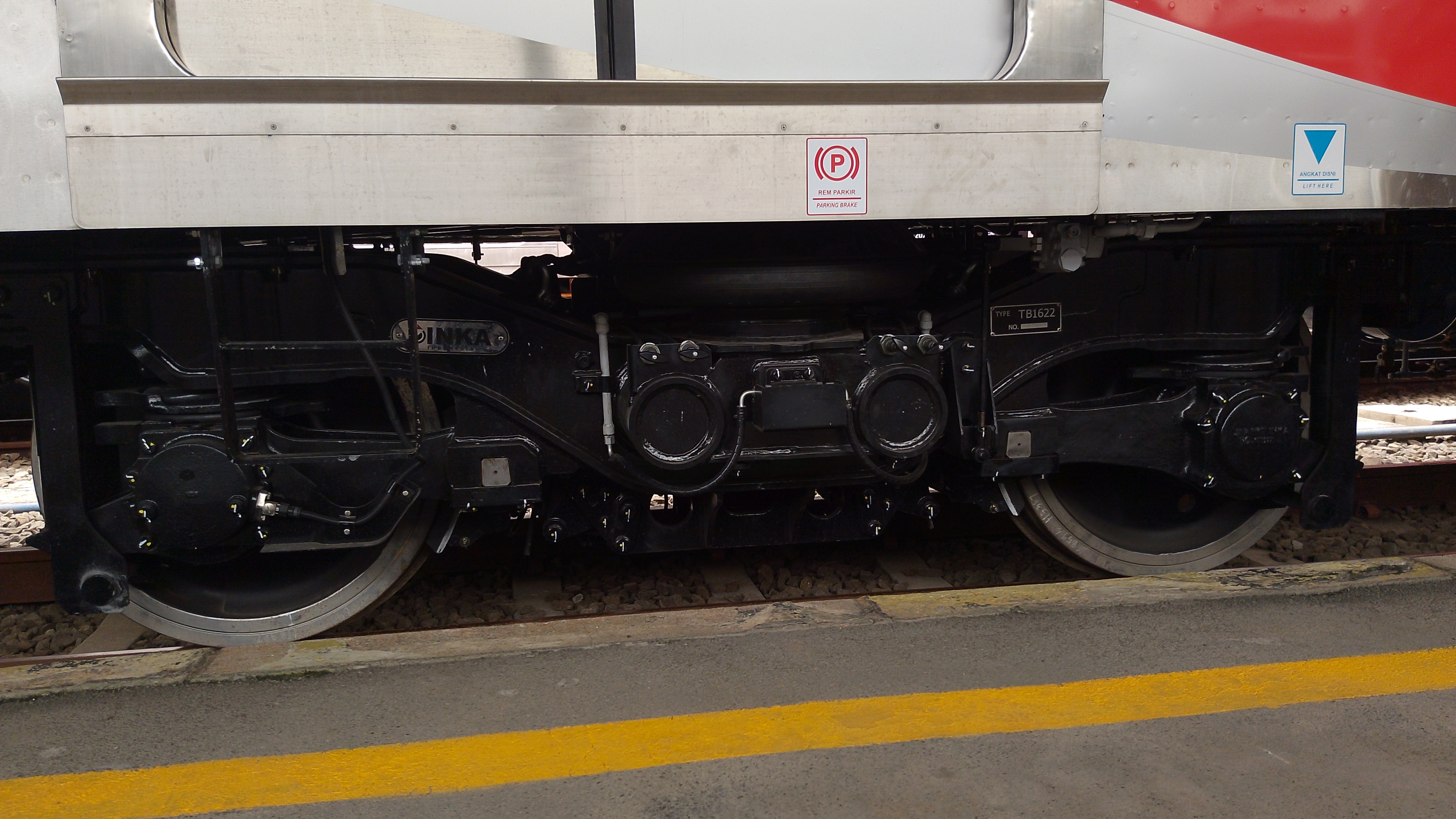
A TB1622 trailer bogie

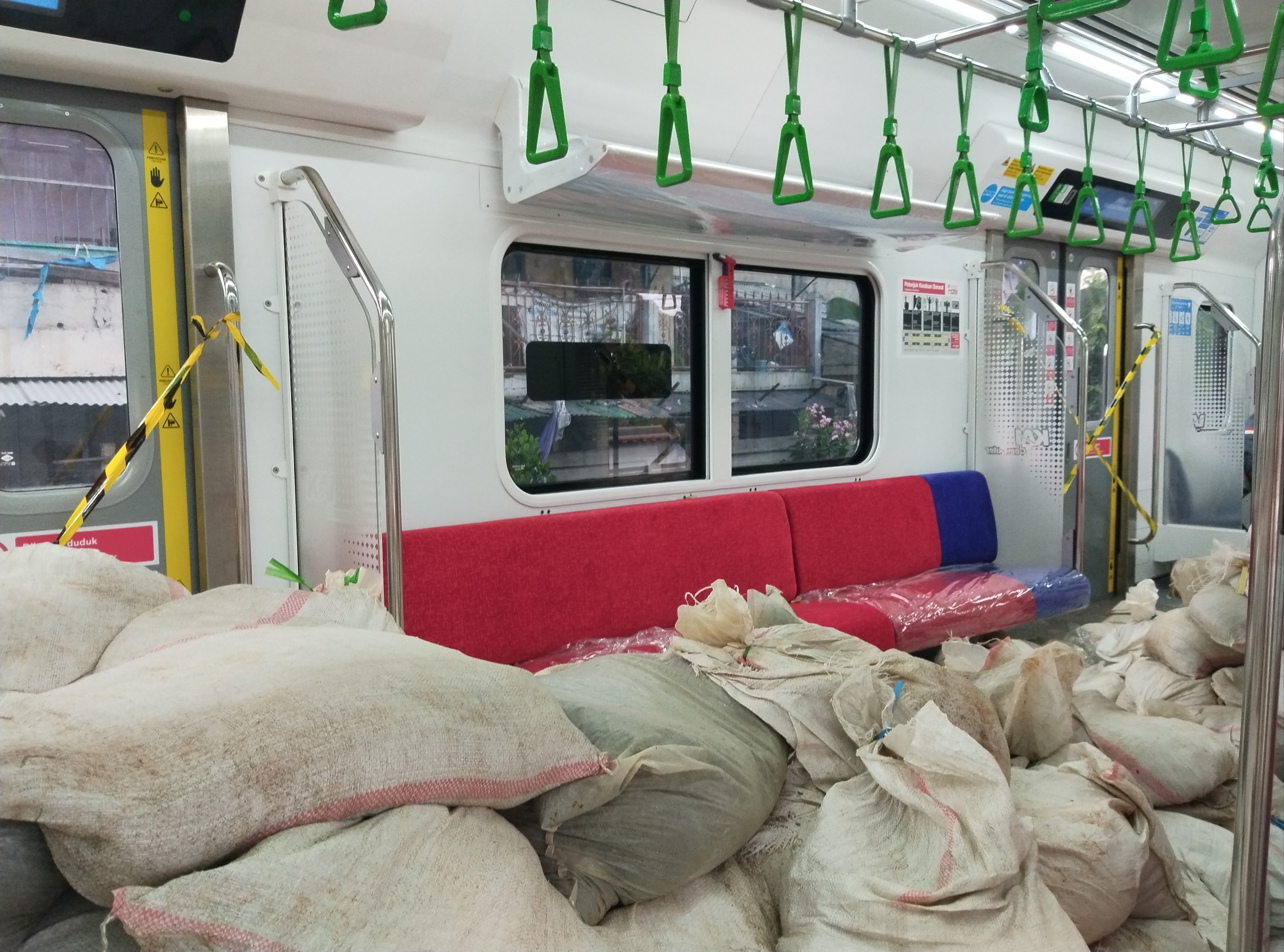
Several filled sacks were used to simulate the passenger load during rush hour on the train during the test run.

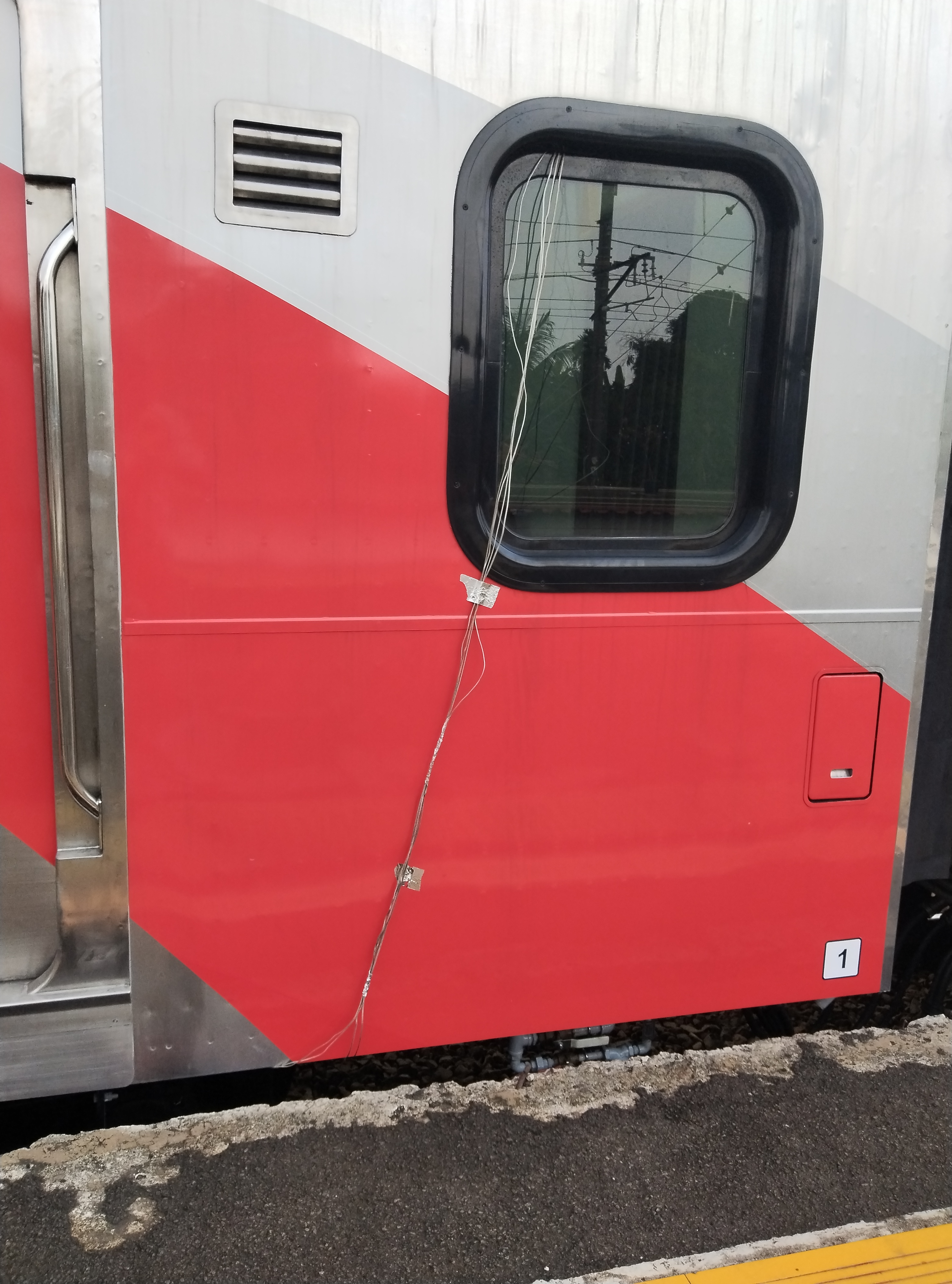
Several sensor cables are attached to the iE305 series to monitor the bogie's performance and send data to the technicians during the test run.

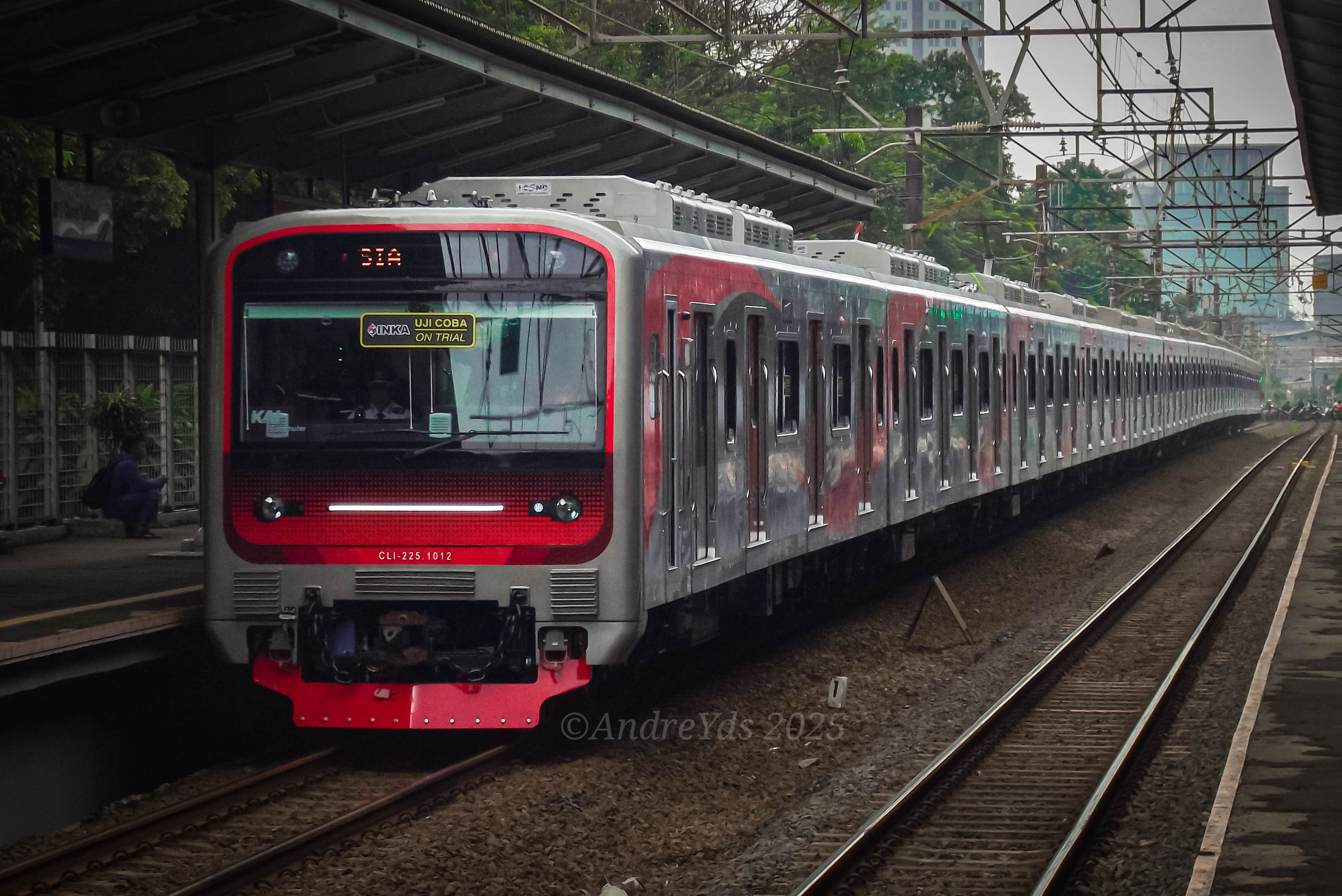
iE305 Series entering track 2 of Duren Kalibata station during test run

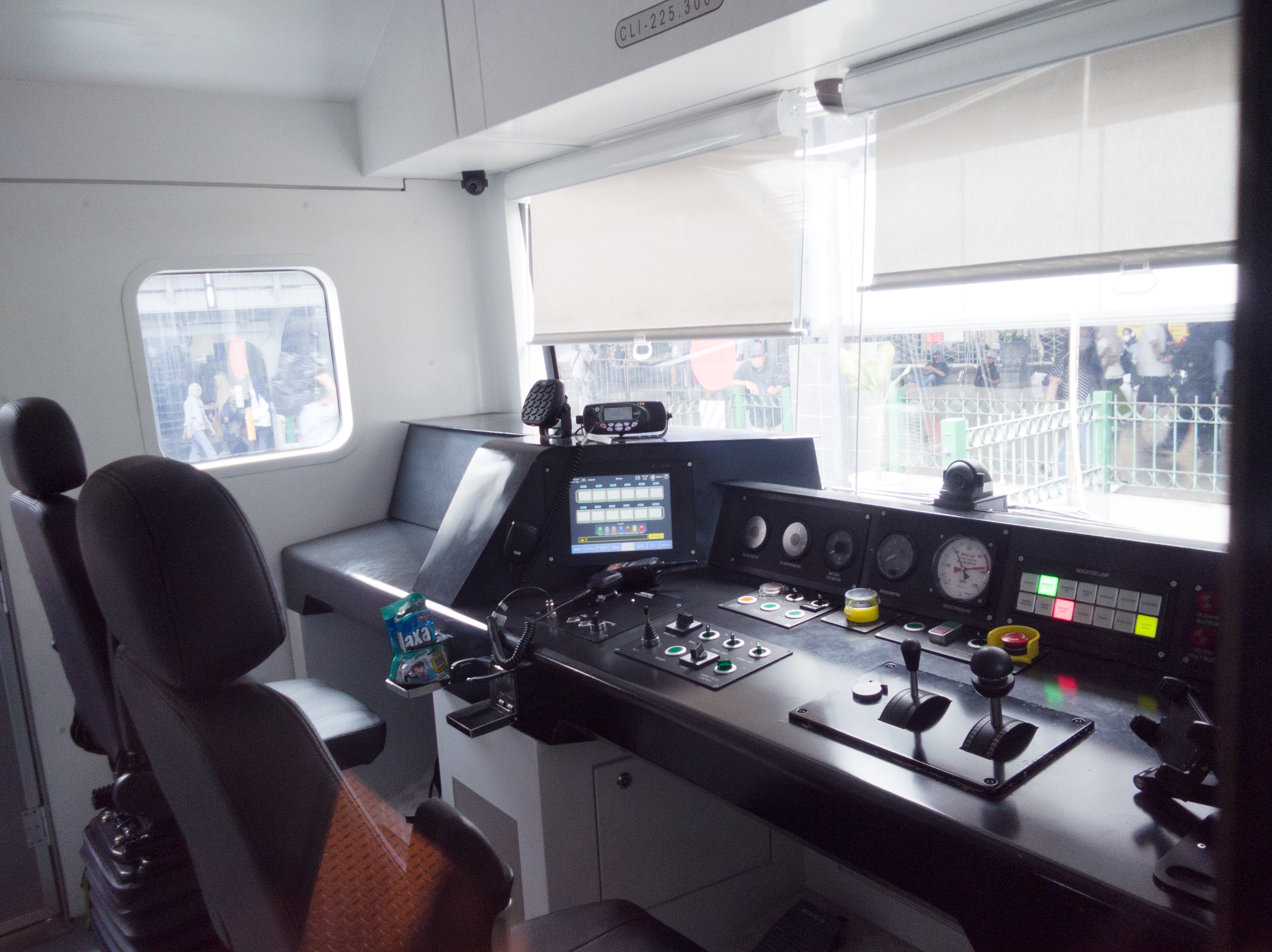
Control cab of the iE305 series

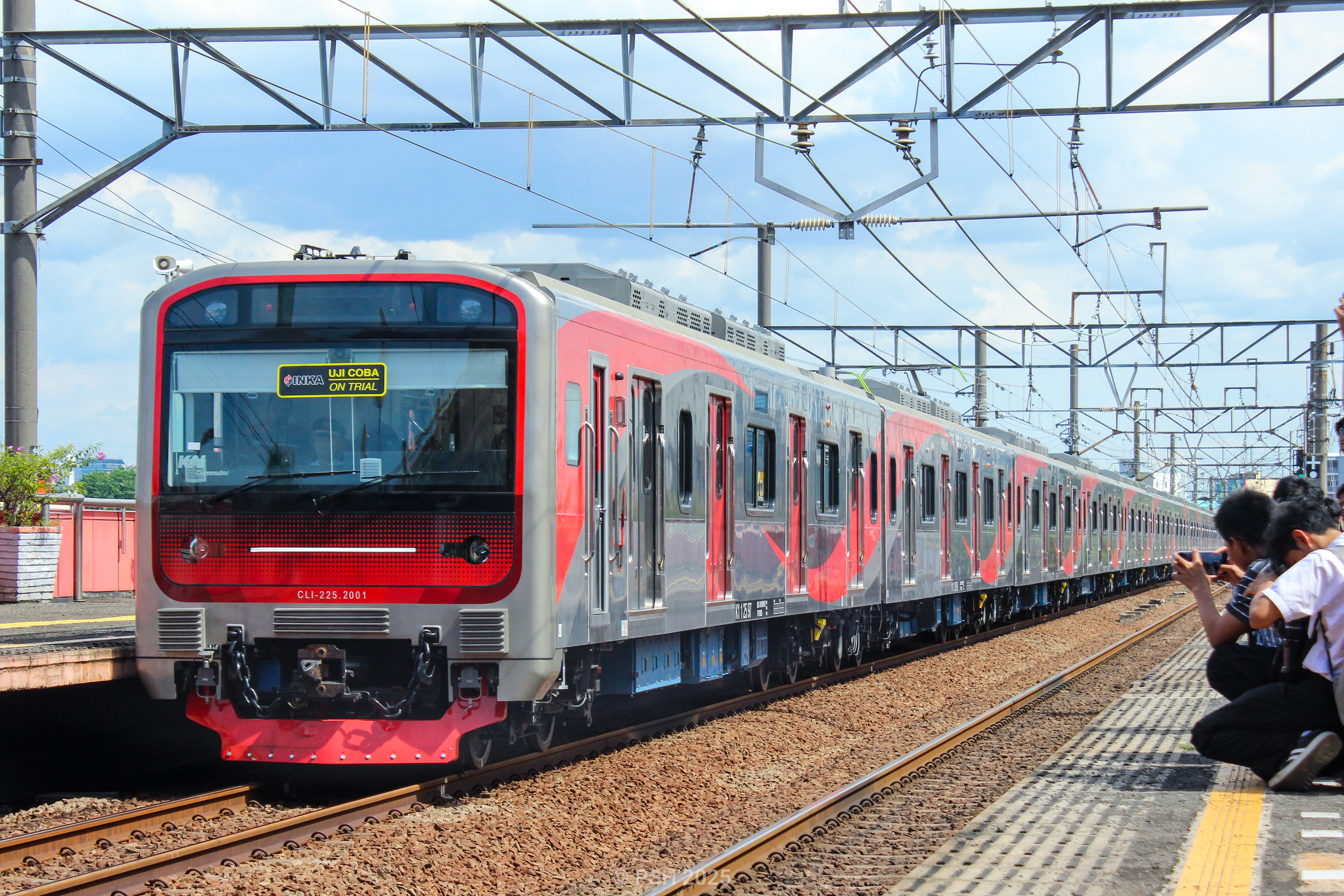
iE305 series arrived at track 2 of Jayakarta station while conducting a test run on the Bogor Line.

== See also ==
Media related to IE305 series at Wikimedia Commons

- SFC120-V Series
