= Tokyu 8000 series =

Japanese train type

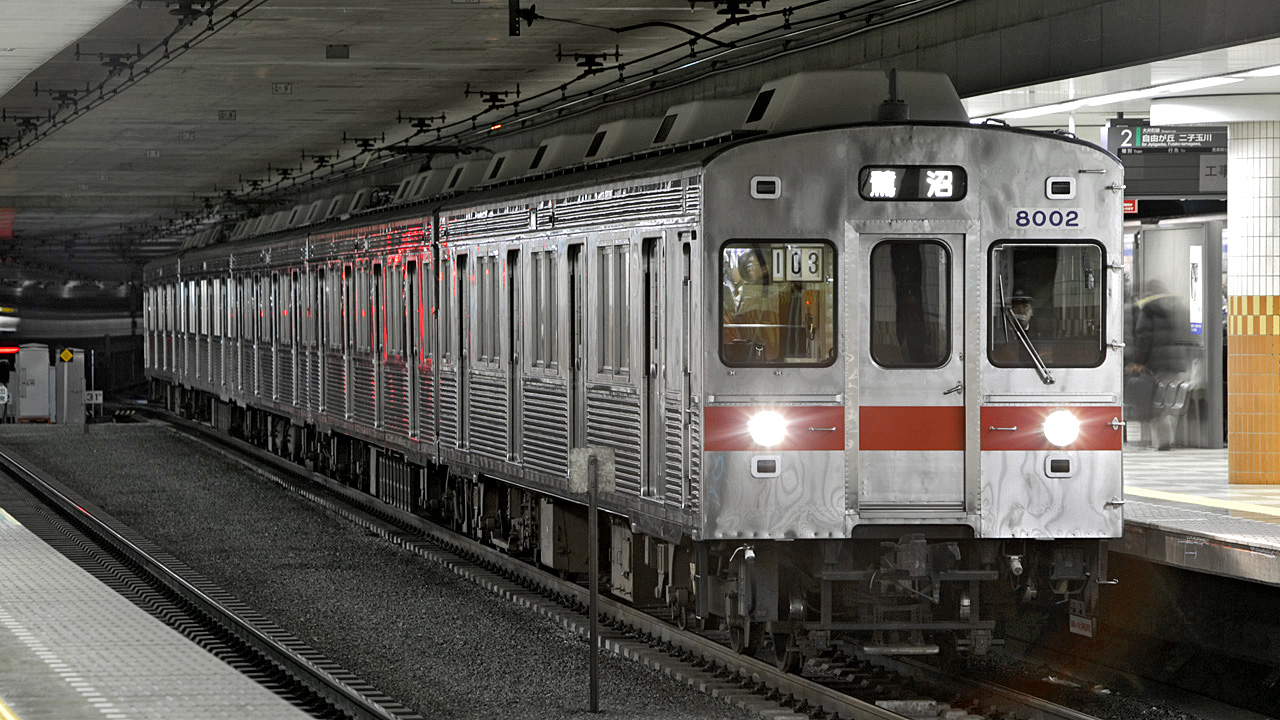
- 8000 series train at Ōokayama Station
- In service: 1969-present (only resold trains still in operation; Tokyu trains retired on 22 February 2008)
- Manufacturer: Tokyu Car Corporation
- Constructed: 1969–1985
- Entered service: 1969–2008 (Tokyu Corporation); 2004–present (Izukyū Corporation); 2005–2024 (KAI Commuter)
- Scrapped: 2004–
- Number built: 677 vehicles
- Number in service: 69 vehicles
- Number preserved: 1 vehicle
- Number scrapped: 607 vehicles
- Successor: Tokyu 5000 series (Japan); CLI-125 series; CLI-225 series (Indonesia)
- Formation: 5/8 cars per trainset (Tokyu); 3 cars per trainset (Izukyū); 8 cars per trainset (KAI Commuter)
- Operators: Tokyu Corporation; Izukyū Corporation; KAI Commuter
- Lines served: Izukyū Corporation, KAI Commuter Cikarang Loop Line, KAI Commuter Bogor Line, KAI Commuter Tangerang Line

Specifications
- Car body construction: Stainless steel
- Car length: 20 m (65 ft 7 in)
- Doors: 4 pairs per side
- Maximum speed: 120 km/h (75 mph)
- Traction system: Chopper control (Hitachi MMC-HTR-20)
- Traction motors: TKM-69/80
- Power output: 130 kW (170 hp) per motor
- Auxiliaries: Static Inverter (SIV)
- Electric system: 1,500 V DC overhead lines
- Current collection: Pantograph
- Bogies: TS-807 (motored), TS-708 (trailer), TS-815F (trailer, since 1990)
- Braking system: Electronically controlled pneumatic brakes with regenerative braking
- Safety systems: Tokyu ATS, ATC-P, Deadman Pedal
- Coupling system: AAR coupling
- Track gauge: 1,067 mm (3 ft 6 in)

The Tokyu 8000 series (東急8000系, Tōkyū 8000-kei) was a commuter electric multiple unit (EMU) train type originally operated by the private railway operator Tokyu Corporation in Japan from 1969 until 2008. Some 8000 series trains are still operated by Izukyū Corporation in Japan, and some were exported to Indonesia for use on the KRL Commuterline network operated by KAI Commuter until 2025

== Technical specifications ==
The trains have typical 20 m (65 ft 7 in)-long stainless steel car-bodies. Tokyu operated the 8000 series as five- and eight-car sets, with three and six motored cars per trainset, respectively.

== History ==
The 8000 series entered service in 1969. 187 cars have been built. Five-car sets operated on the Oimachi Line, and eight-car sets operated on the Toyoko Line. Tokyu withdrew the 8000 series from service in 2008.

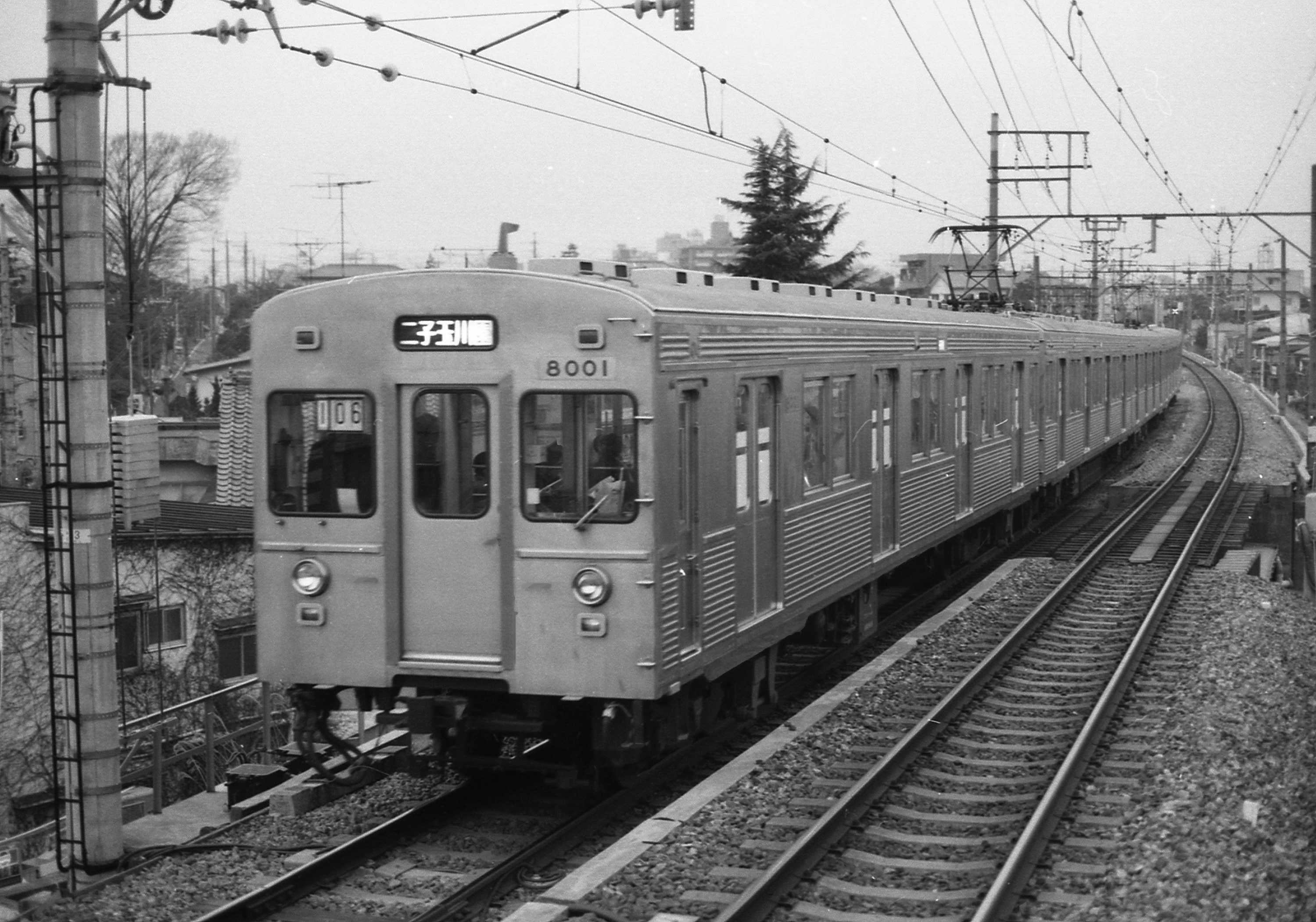
8000 series on the Oimachi Line in 1985

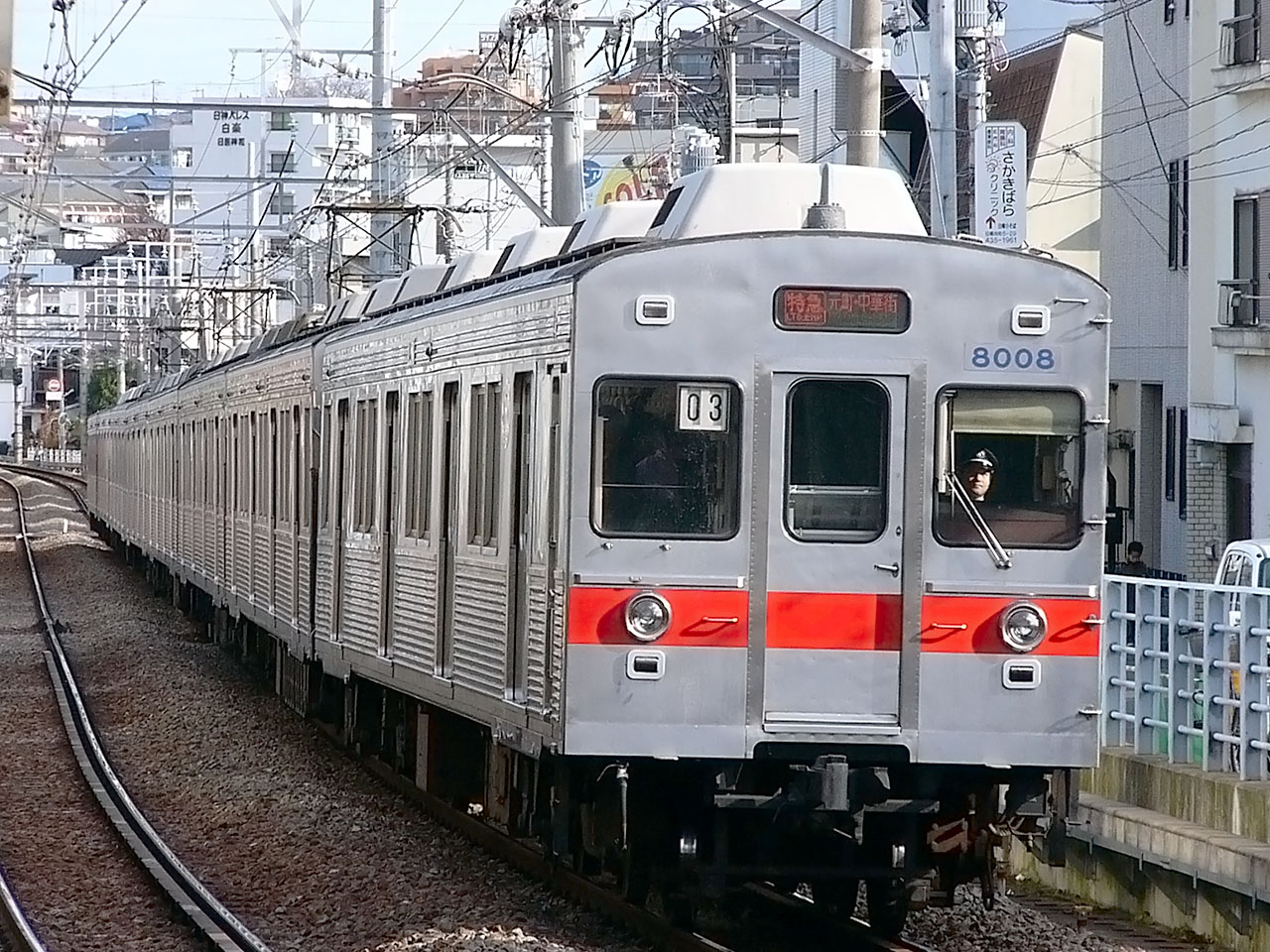
8000 series on the Toyoko Line in 2004

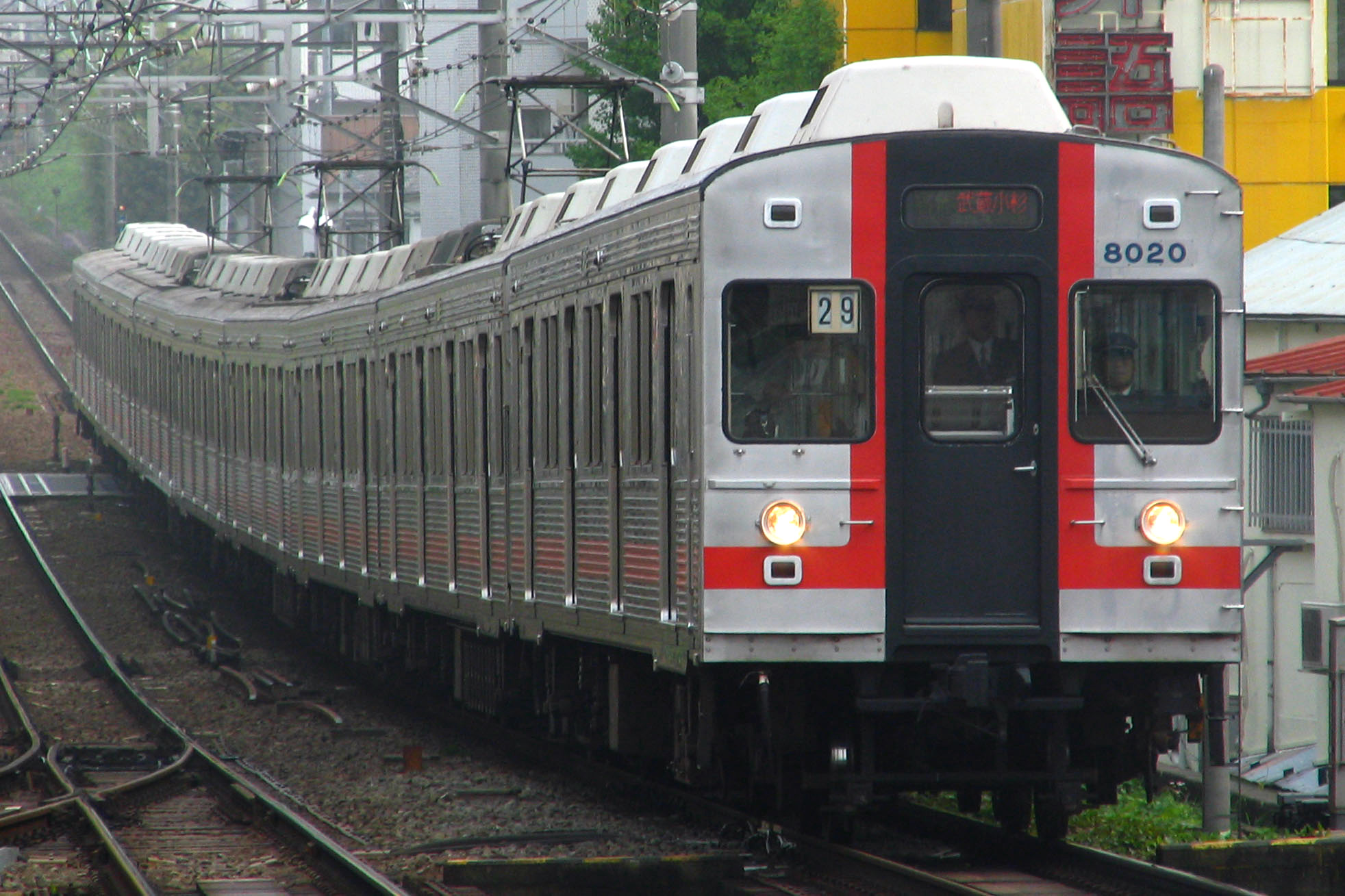
8000 series in "Kabuki" livery in 2007

== Other operators ==
45 withdrawn 8000 series cars were transferred to Izukyū Corporation, and 3 sets 8 cars were shipped to Indonesia. The Izukyū fleet is formed as three-car sets.

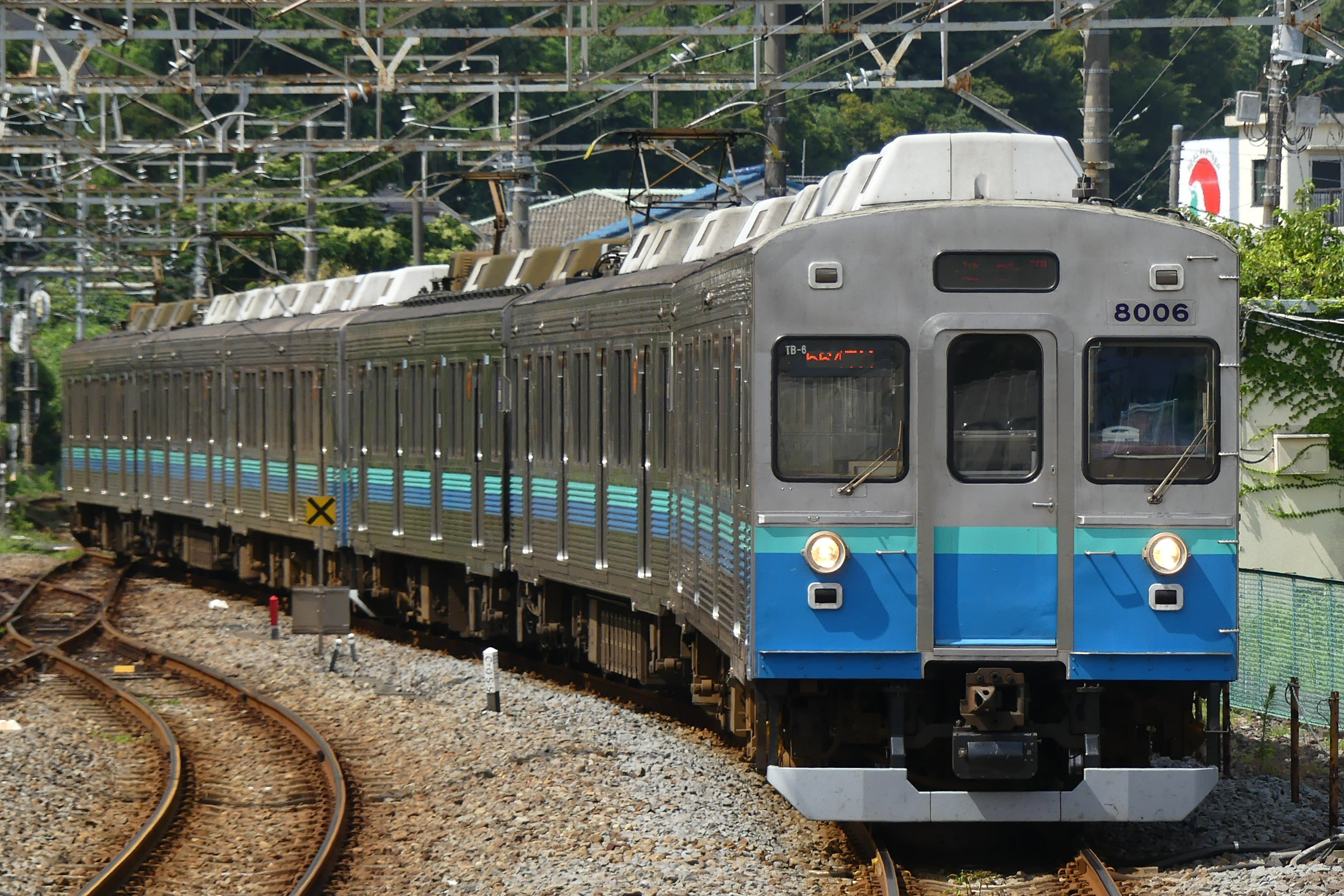
Izukyū 8000 series

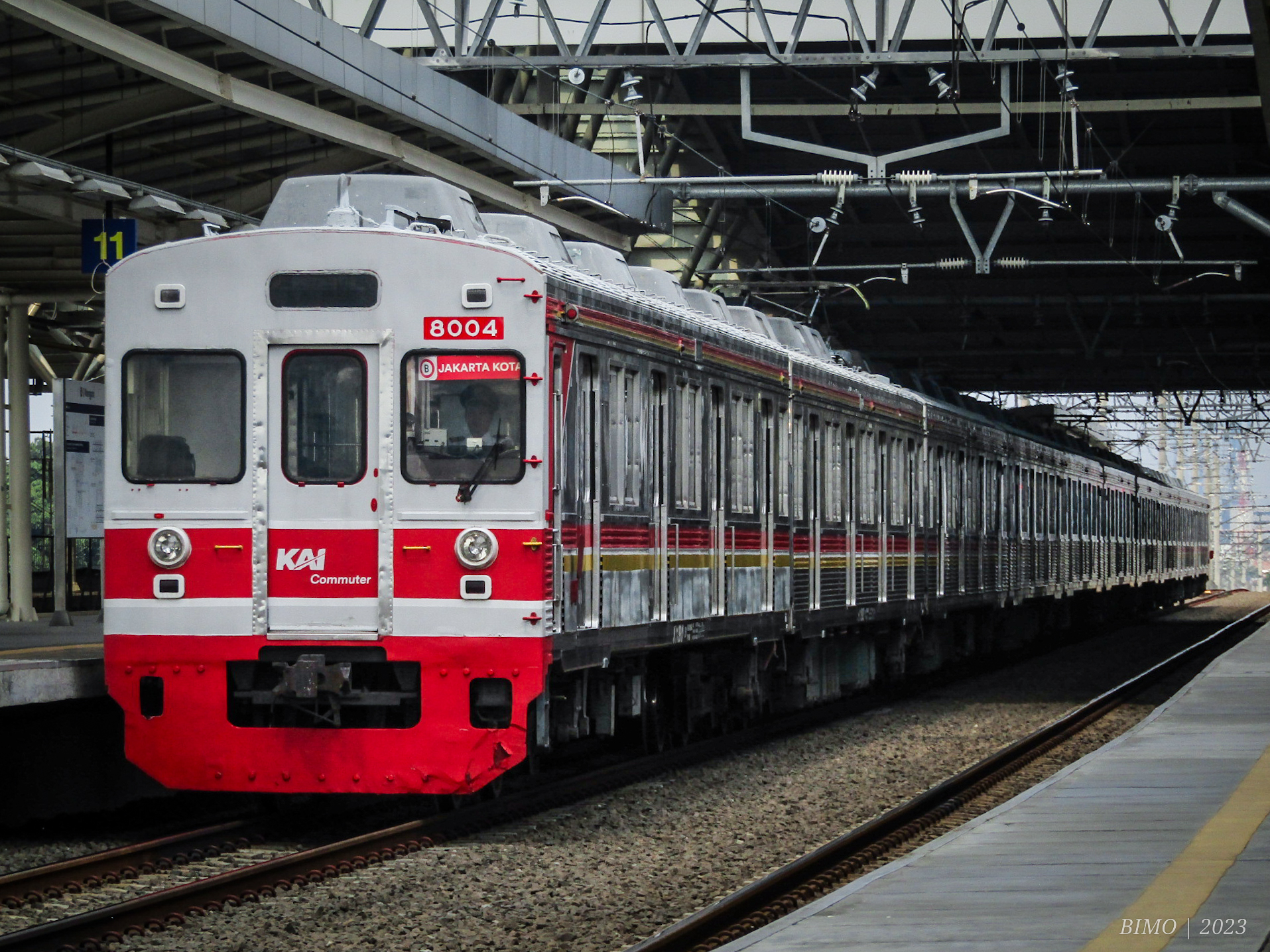
Tokyu 8000 series in Indonesia

== See also ==
- Tokyu 8500 series, EMU type based on the 8000 series
