= ESS 3200 class =

Dutch East Indies/Indonesian locomotives

ESS 3200 class WH 200 class
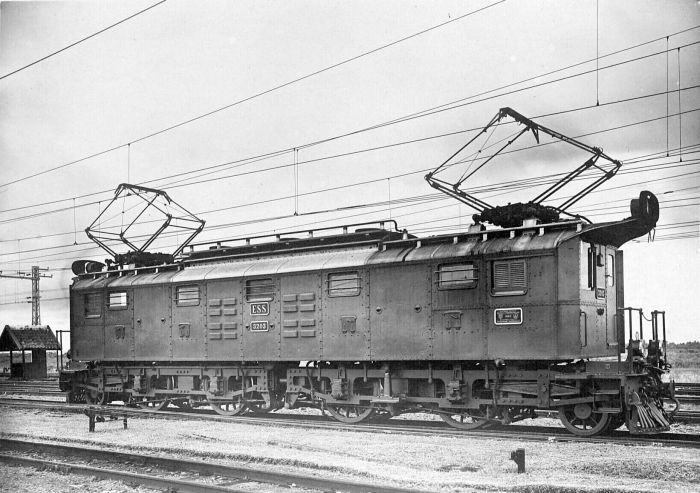
- An ESS 3200 class locomotive, c. 1929
Type and origin
- Power type: Electric
- Builder: Werkspoor
Specifications
- Configuration
  - UIC: (1Bo)+(Bo1)
  - Commonwealth: 1Bo+Bo1
- Electric system/s: 1,500 V DC
- Current pickup: pantograph
Performance figures
- Power output: 765 kilowatts (1,026 hp)
Career
- Number in class: 6
- Numbers: 3201-3202 (1925); 3203-3206 (1928); 201-206 (renumbered 1945)
- First run: 6 April 1925
- Retired: 1976
- Preserved: 1

The ESS 3200, later the WH 200 (Werkspoor-Heemaf) was a class of electric locomotives built for the Staatsspoorwegen, the State Railway of the Dutch East Indies (modern day Indonesia).

The ESS 3200s were first used on 6 April 1925, which also was the same day the first electrified railway line in Java from Tanjung Priok to Meester Cornelis (modern day Jatinegara) was opened.

== Design and service history ==
The ESS 3200s were of the 1-Bo+Bo-1 wheel arrangement, used a 1,500 V DC overhead catenary, producing 765 kilowatts (1,026 hp). They were built by the Werkspoor using Baldwin equipment, and had Heemaf / Westinghouse electric motors. Six locomotives were built for the line. Although the 1,500 V DC system was the most popular of the 1920s, Baldwin-Westinghouse were better known for their AC electric locomotives.

The ESS 3200s, now reclassified as the WH (Werkspoor-Heemaf) 200 class were in service until 1976.

== Preservation ==
After sitting idle for many years, 3202 was returned to working order. It was returned to service and as of 2013, was hauling tourist trains in Jakarta. 3202 currently bears road number 3201. The original 3201 was totalled in the 1968 Ratujaya train collision.

3202 is currently stored at Manggarai rolling stock workshop.

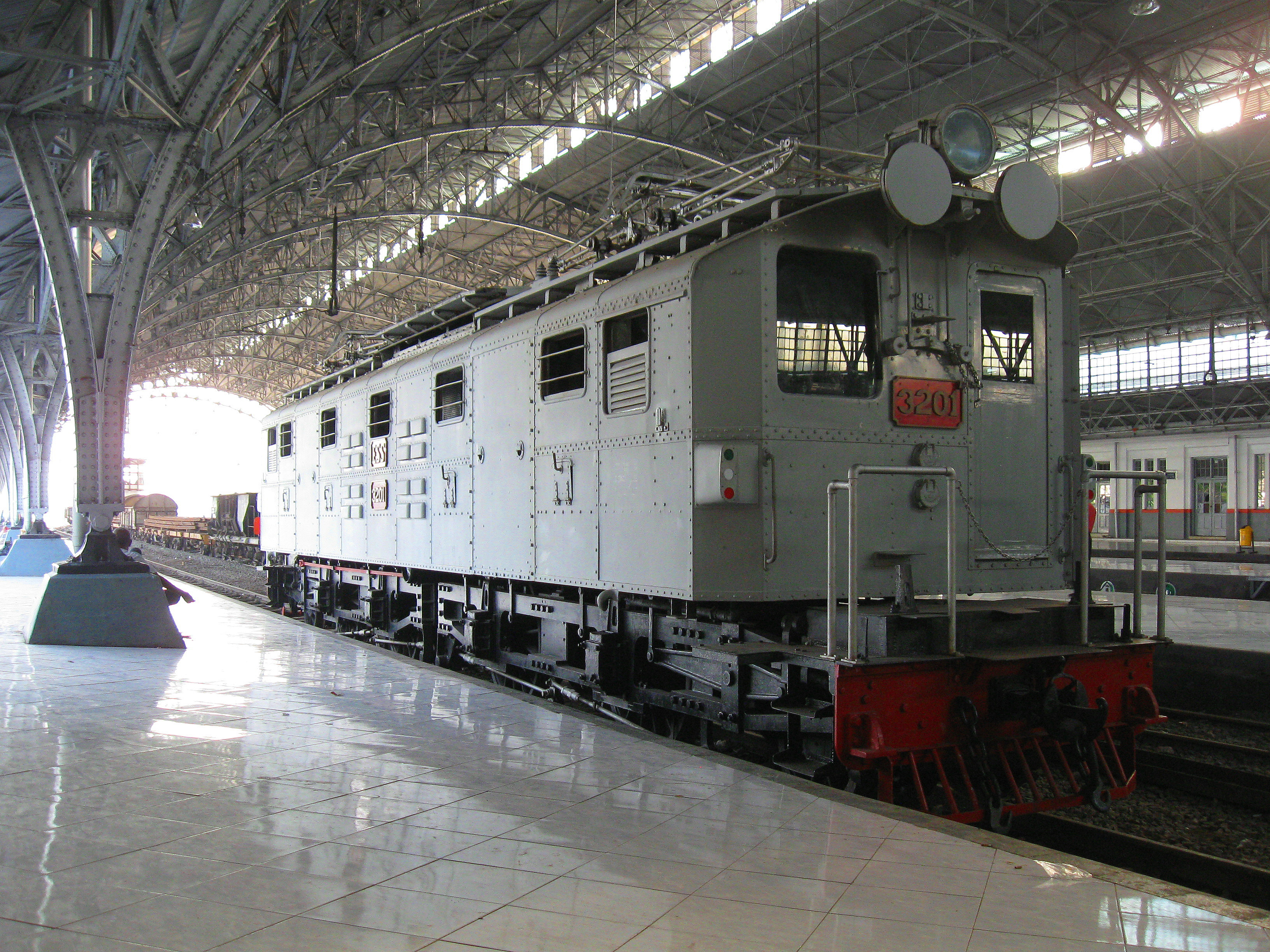
ESS 3202 (bearing road number 3201) at Tanjung Priuk, 2009

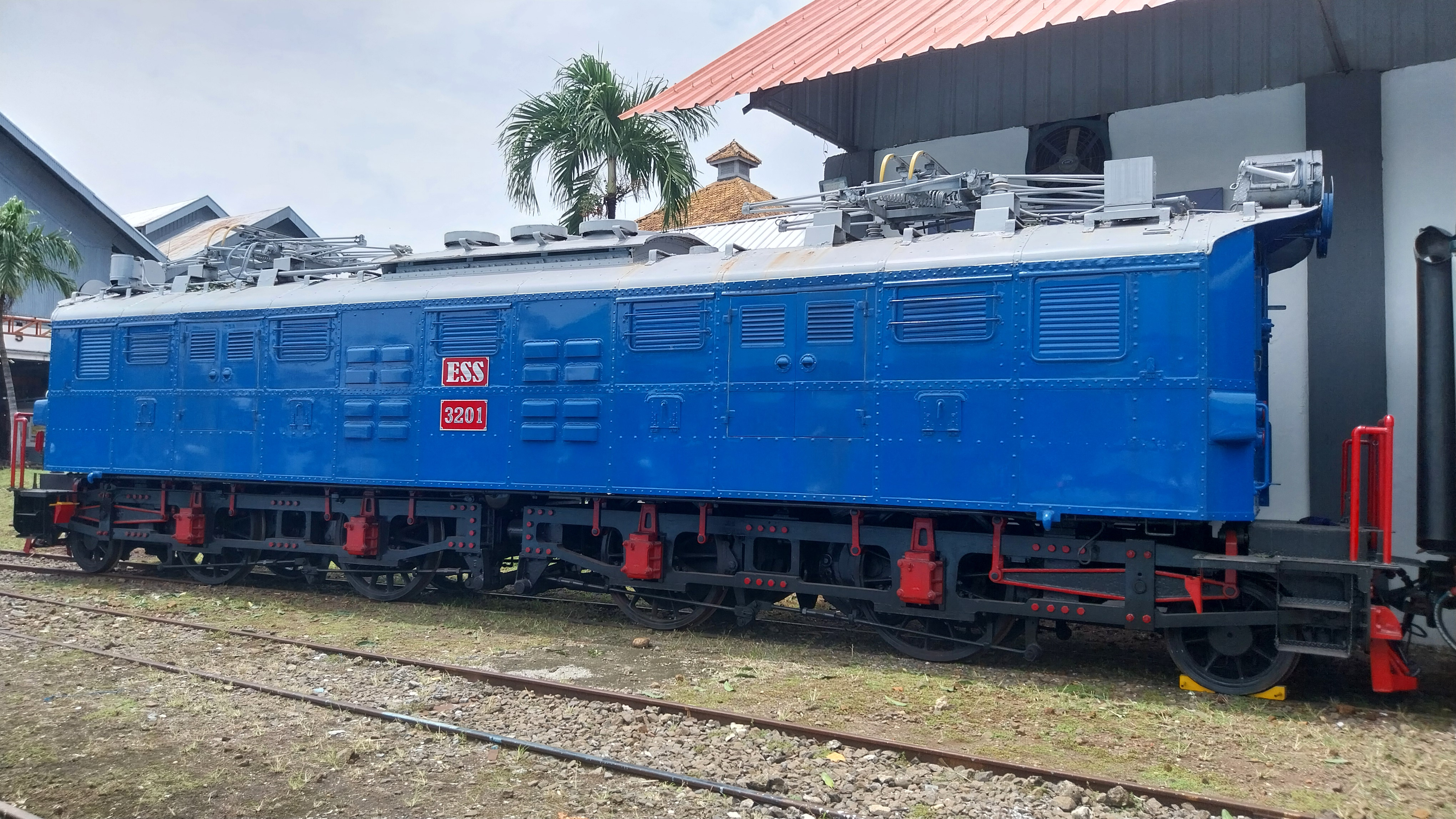
ESS 3201 in Manggarai Railway Workshop on the early 2026

Film showing the locomotives being delivered from the builder

== See also ==
- Baldwin-Westinghouse electric locomotives
