= 8500 =

8500 may refer to:

- The year 8500, the 9th millennium
- ATI Radeon 8500, a computer graphics card series
- NVIDIA GeForce 8500, a computer graphics card series
- A variant of the MOS 6510 CPU.

== See also ==
- 8500 series (disambiguation)
