= 8500 series =

8500 series may refer to:

- Fujikyu 8500 series, EMU train operated by Fuji Kyuko in Japan
- Meitetsu KiHa 8500 series DMU train formerly operated by Meitetsu
- Toei 8500 series, tramcar type operated by Toei in Japan
- Tokyu 8500 series, EMU train type operated by Tokyu in Japan
