= Meitetsu KiHa 8000 series =

Diesel multiple unit train type formerly operated in Japan

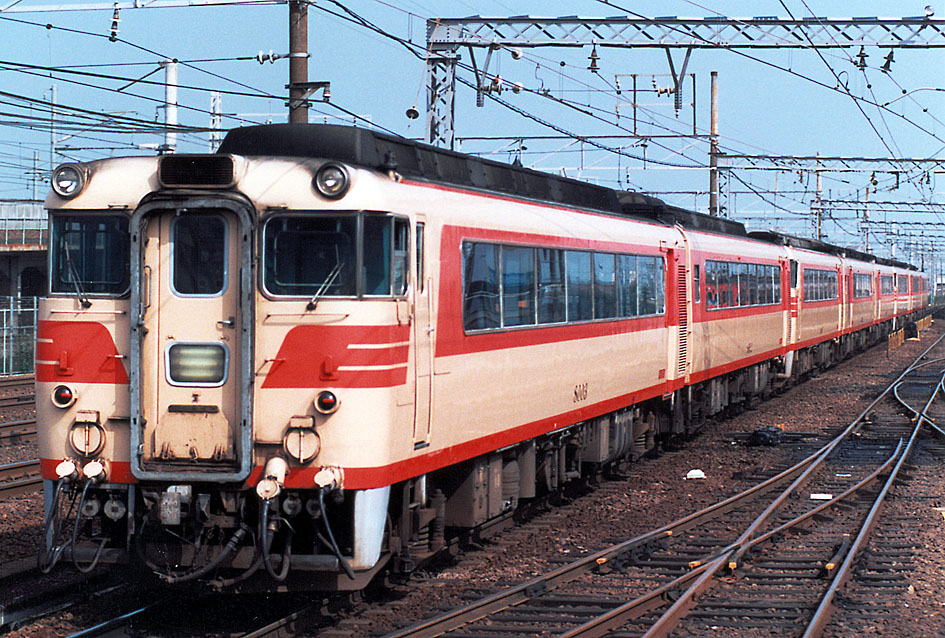
- A KiHa 8000 series train led by 8003 in 1988

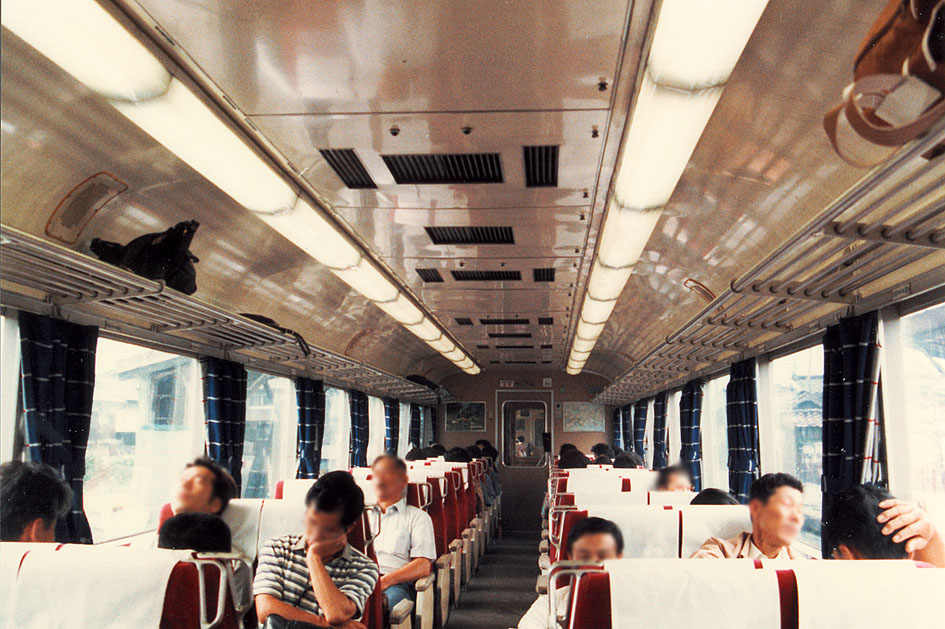
- Interior of car KiHa 8052
- In service: 1965–1991
- Manufacturer: Nippon Sharyo
- Constructed: 1965, 1969
- Entered service: 5 August 1965
- Scrapped: 1985–1991
- Number built: 12 cars
- Number in service: None
- Number preserved: None
- Number scrapped: 12 cars
- Formation: Various
- Fleet numbers: Various
- Operators: Nagoya Railroad
- Lines served: Meitetsu Nagoya Main Line, Takayama Main Line

Specifications
- Car length: 20.73 m (68 ft 1/8 in) (KiHa 8200 series cars); 19.73 m (64 ft 8 3/4 in) (all other cars)
- Width: 2.7 m (8 ft 10 5/16 in) (KiHa 8200 series cars); 2.73 m (8 ft 11 1/2 in) (all other cars)
- Maximum speed: 95 km/h (59 mph)
- Prime mover(s): DMH17H engine, various configurations
- Bogies: DT22C
- Braking system(s): DAE-1 air brakes
- Safety system(s): Meitetsu ATS, ATS-S
- Track gauge: 1,067 mm (3 ft 6 in)

Notes/references
- This train won the 9th Blue Ribbon Award in 1966.

Meitetsu KiHa 8000 series (名鉄キハ8000系) was an umbrella term used to refer to twelve limited express diesel multiple unit cars of similar specifications operated by Nagoya Railroad (Meitetsu) in Japan from 1965 to 1991. These cars were the recipients of the 9th Blue Ribbon Award held in 1966.

== History ==
The KiHa 8000 series cars were built in two batches of six cars; six were built and delivered in 1965 and another six in 1969 for a total of twelve cars. The cars were based on the KiHa 58 series that had been in service with the Japanese National Railways (JNR) since 1961, and as such, share components such as engines and bogeys.

The trains were originally used on Takayama limited express services, to which it was quite difficult to reserve a seat for especially during peak periods due to various luxuries inside the KiHa 8000 series cars, such as air-conditioning. The Takayama service was renamed to Kita Alps in 1970, due to the opening of various stations on the line; despite this, the KiHa 8000 series cars were still used on those services.

However, by 1989, more advanced diesel multiple units were being developed by various manufacturers, and the obsolescence of the KiHa 8000 series cars were starting to show. All operations of the Kita Alps service were transferred to newer KiHa 8500 series diesel railcars by 1991, and the last few KiHa 8000 series cars were withdrawn that same year.

No KiHa 8000 series cars have been preserved; all twelve cars were scrapped between 1985 and 1991.

== Variants ==
- KiHa 8000 series
- KiHa 8050 series
- KiRo 8100/8150 series
- KiHa 8200 series

=== KiHa 8000 series ===
Two cars of this type, 8001 and 8002, were manufactured in July 1965. A third car, 8003, was manufactured in September 1969. Both cars had a single cab and were equipped with one engine. The cars were upgraded in 1976 with a room for a conductor. All three cars were scrapped between 1985 and 1990.

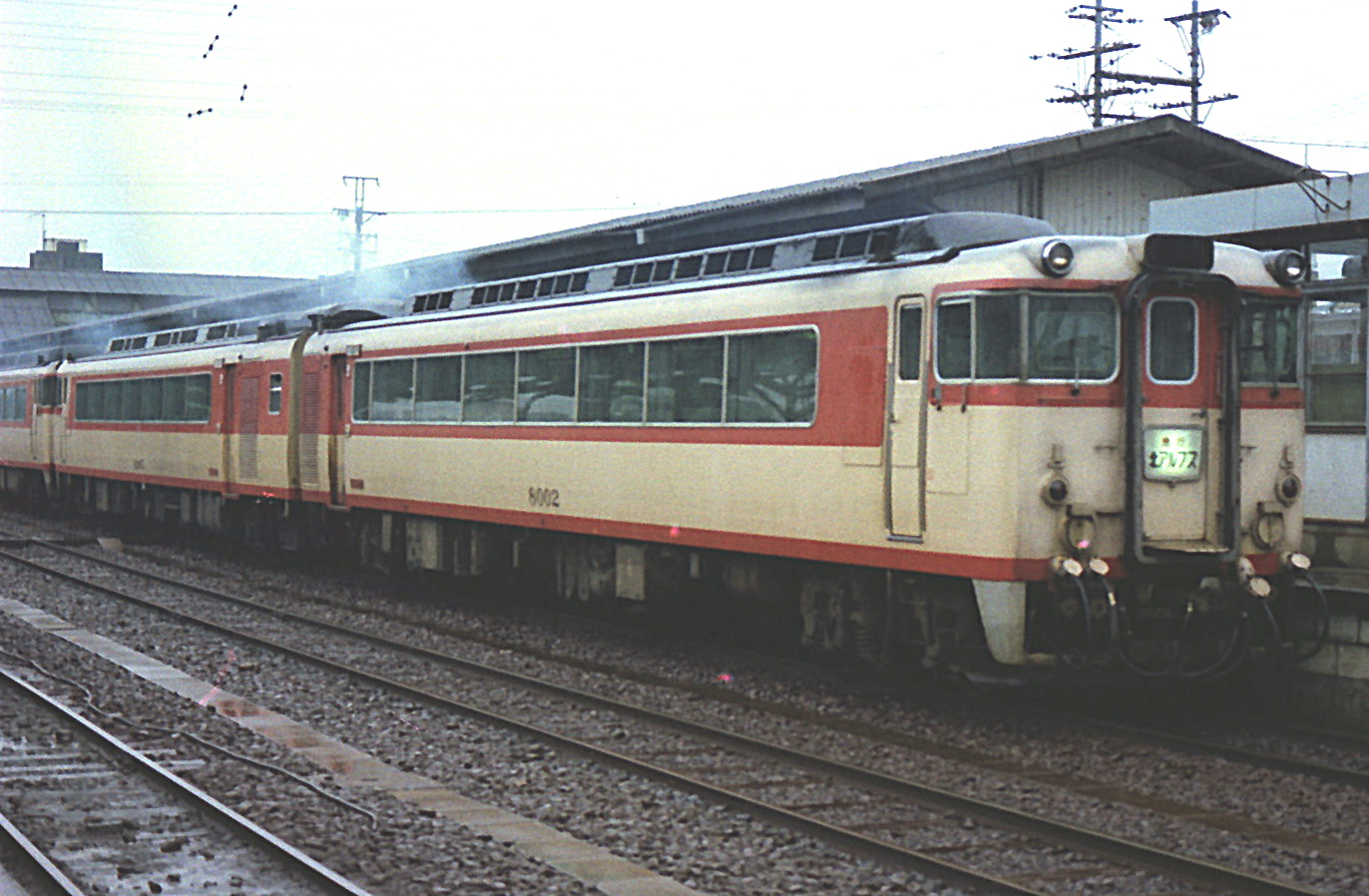
Cars 8001 and 8002

=== KiHa 8050 series ===
Two cars of this type, 8051 and 8052, were manufactured in July 1965. Both cars were intermediate cars with no cabs, and had two engines to cope with the steep grades of the Takayama Main Line. Both cars were scrapped between 1985 and 1990.

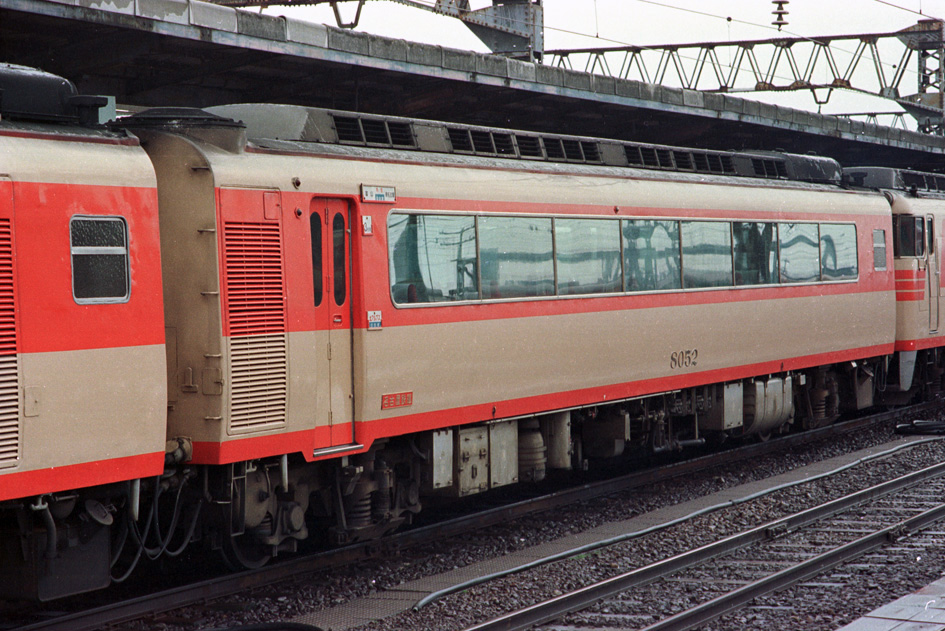
Car 8052

=== KiRo 8100/8150 series ===
One cab car, 8101, and one intermediate car, 8151, were manufactured in July 1965 for a total of two cars of this type. Both cars were "first-class" cars and came with reclining seats. Both cars were eventually downgraded to standard class cars 8101 and 8102, with the reclining seats being removed. The reclining seats from both of these cars were to be used for an upcoming train car, but they were never used due to plans for constructing the train falling through. Both cars were scrapped in 1985.

=== KiHa 8200 series ===
Five cars, numbered 8201 to 8205, were manufactured in September 1969. All five cars had a single cab and were equipped with two engines to cope with the steep grades of the Takayama Main Line, and were slightly longer and narrower than all other variants. With a length of 20,730 mm (68 ft 0 in), the KiHa 8200 series cars were the longest cars Meitetsu had owned at the time. The KiHa 8200 series cars were the longest lasting of all variants of the KiHa 8000 series, and were in service all the way from 1969 until their retirement in 1991. All five cars were scrapped in 1991.

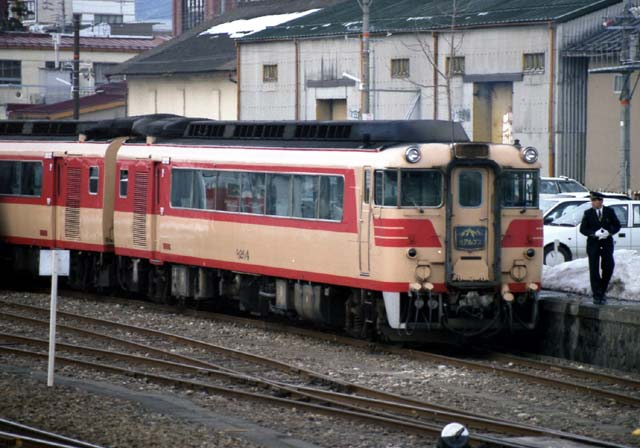
Car 8203
