= Tokyu 8500 series =

Japanese train type

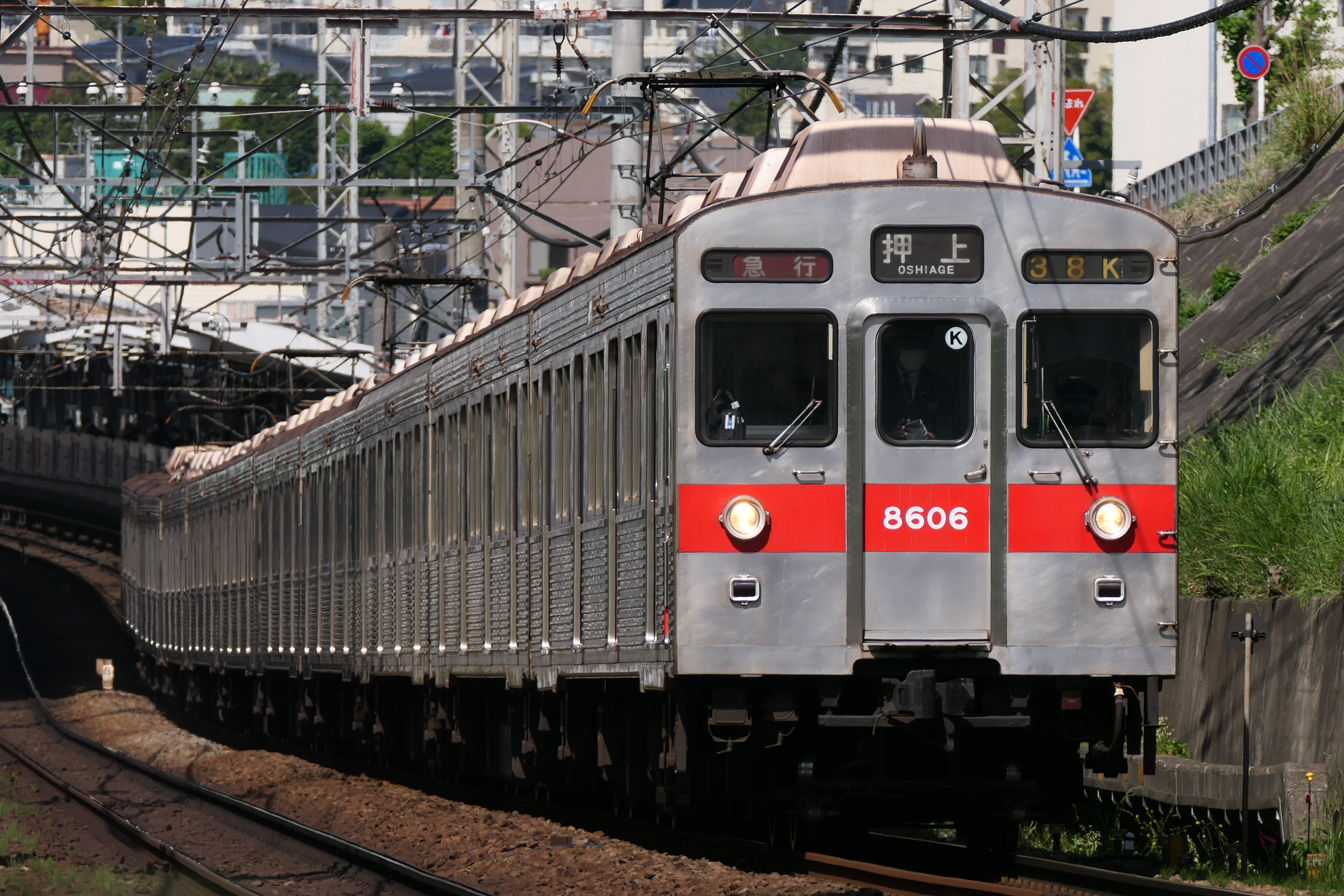
- 8500 series set 8606 in May 2020
- In service: 1975–2023 (Tokyu); 2006–2025 (KAI Commuter)
- Manufacturer: Tokyu Car Corporation
- Constructed: 1975–1991
- Entered service: 1975
- Number built: 400 vehicles
- Number in service: None
- Number preserved: 4 vehicles (1 set)
- Successor: Tokyu 5000 series; Tokyu 2020 series (Japan); CLI-125 series; CLI-225 series (Indonesia)
- Formation: 10 (previously 5/6, orig. 4) cars per trainset (Tokyu); 8 cars per trainset (KAI Commuter)
- Operators: Tokyu Corporation; KAI Commuter
- Depots: Nagatsuta (Japan); Bogor (Indonesia)
- Lines served: Indonesia: (all retired): KAI Commuter Bogor Line (seasonal); KAI Commuter Tanjung Priok Line; Japan: (all retired): Tokyu Den-en-toshi Line; Tokyu Oimachi Line; Tokyu Toyoko Line; Tokyo Metro Hanzōmon Line; Tobu Isesaki Line; Tobu Nikko Line; Tobu Skytree Line

Specifications
- Car body construction: Stainless steel
- Car length: 20,000 mm (65 ft 7 in)
- Width: 2,800 mm (9 ft 2 in)
- Height: 4,100 mm (13 ft 5 in)
- Doors: 4 pairs per side
- Maximum speed: Service: 110 km/h (68 mph); Design: 120 km/h (75 mph)
- Traction system: Chopper Hitachi MMC-HTR-20
- Traction motors: TKM-69/80
- Power output: 130 kW (170 hp) per motor
- Acceleration: 3.3 km/(h⋅s) (2.1 mph/s)
- Deceleration: 3.5 km/(h⋅s) (2.2 mph/s); 4.5 km/(h⋅s) (2.8 mph/s) (Emergency)
- Electric systems: 1,500 V DC Overhead line
- Current collection: Pantograph
- Bogies: TS-807A, TS-815C with air springs
- Braking system: Electronically controlled pneumatic brakes with regenerative braking
- Safety systems: Tokyu ATS, ATC-P, Deadman Pedal
- Coupling system: AAR coupling
- Track gauge: 1,067 mm (3 ft 6 in)

The Tokyu 8500 series (東急8500系, Tōkyū 8500-kei) is a retired commuter electric multiple unit (EMU) train type operated by the private railway operator Tokyu Corporation on the Tokyu Den-en-toshi Line and Tokyu Oimachi Line in the Tokyo area of Japan from 1975 until 2023, and the Jabodetabek area of Indonesia from 2006 until 2025.

== Design ==
Based on the design of the 8000 series, the 8500 series was introduced as the sixth batch of the 8000 series fleet, featuring some differences over the preceding batches. Among these include a raised driver's cab position, automatic train control (ATC), and air conditioning.

== Operations ==
The 10-car trainsets were primarily used on Tokyu Den-en-toshi Line services, running through to the Tokyo Metro Hanzōmon Line, Tobu Skytree Line, Tobu Isesaki Line as far as Kuki, and the Tobu Nikko Line as far as Minami-Kurihashi. Five-car sets were used on Tokyu Oimachi Line services until April 2019.

== History ==
The Tokyu 8500 series first entered service in 1975, operating on Tokyu Toyoko Line services, as well as Tokyu Shin-Tamagawa Line (between Shibuya and Futako-Tamagawaen stations) and Den-en-toshi Line services. The 8500 series was a recipient of the 1976 Laurel Prize. Early examples of the 8500 series were initially delivered as four-car sets; however, they were ultimately lengthened to ten-car sets. A total of 400 vehicles were built by 1991.

When the Teito Rapid Transit Authority (TRTA) Hanzōmon Line opened in 1978, Tokyu leased three 6-car 8500 series trains to the agency for approximately a decade, as they did not yet possess their own trains for the line.

Following the introduction of newer Tokyu 5000 series trainsets in 2002, the 8500 series fleet was gradually withdrawn from Den-en-toshi Line services. Coinciding with the opening of the Hanzōmon Line extension from Suitengumae Station to Oshiage Station on 19 March 2003, some sets saw use on Tobu Line through services via the Hanzōmon Line, operating as far as Kuki on the Tobu Isesaki Line and as far as Minami-Kurihashi on the Tobu Nikko Line.

To allow for an increase in rolling stock for then-upcoming through services between the Tokyu Toyoko Line and Tokyo Metro Fukutoshin Line, Tokyu suspended 8500 series withdrawals in 2009. However, withdrawals resumed following the introduction of newer 2020 series trainsets in 2018. On 5 April 2022, Tokyu announced that the 8500 series would end regular service in January 2023. The two remaining sets at the time of the announcement, sets 8631 and 8637, were withdrawn on 25 May 2022 and 25 January 2023, respectively.

== Preservation ==
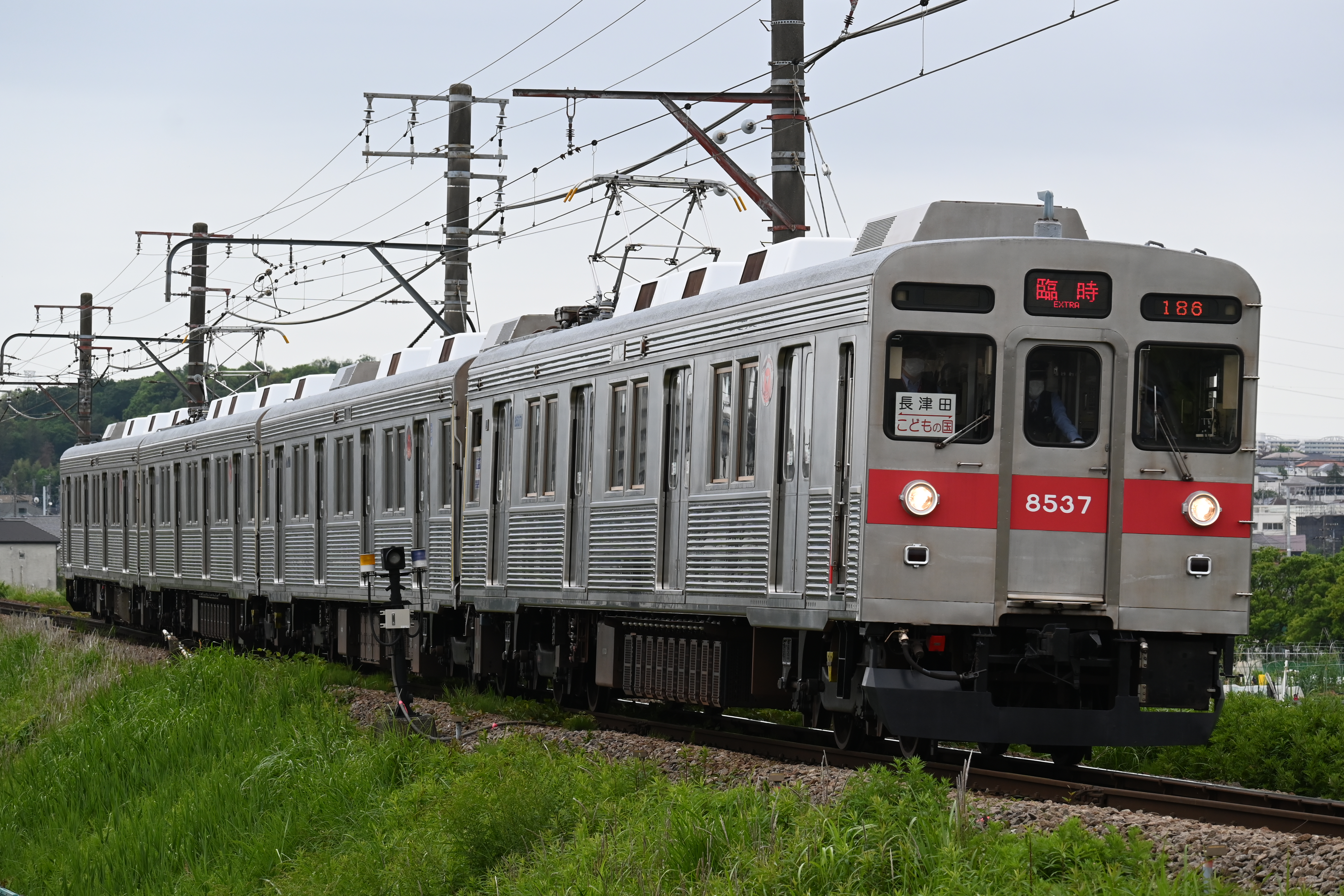
The preserved 8500 series set on the Kodomonokuni Line in May 2026

In August 2024, Tokyu announced that it would shorten 8500 series set 8637 to a four-car formation and preserve it to working order. The set will be used as an excursion train on the Oimachi Line, the Den-en-toshi Line (between Futako-Tamagawa and Nagatsuta), and the Kodomonokuni Line. Originally scheduled to enter service in the final quarter of 2024, the set made its first trip on 2 May 2026, providing additional capacity on the Kodomonokuni Line during Golden Week.

== Formations ==
=== Den-en-toshi Line 10-car sets ===
Den-en-toshi Line 10-car sets, based at Nagatsuta Depot, were formed as shown below with eight motored ("M") cars and two non-powered trailer ("T") cars, and car 1 at the Shibuya end.

Car No.	1	2	3	4	5	6	7	8	9	10
Designation	M2c	M1	T	M2	M1	M2	M1	T	M2	M1c
Numbering	DeHa 8600	DeHa 8700	SaHa 8900	DeHa 8800	DeHa 8700	DeHa 8800	DeHa 8700	SaHa 8900	DeHa 8800	DeHa 8500

- Cars 2, 5, 7, and 10 were each fitted with one lozenge-type pantograph.
- Cars 3 and 9 had a wheelchair space.
- Car 2 was designated as a mildly air-conditioned car.

Den-en-toshi Line sets 8601 to 8614 were marked with "K" stickers on the center front window of the driving cab ends, and they were restricted to operating on Den-en-toshi Line and Tokyo Metro Hanzōmon Line only, due to lack of Tobu ATS on these sets. After the opening of the Hanzōmon Line extension from Suitengūmae Station to Oshiage Station, sets 8601, 8602, 8613, and 8614 were fitted with Tobu ATS, allowing them to operate on Tobu Skytree Line, Tobu Isesaki Line and Tobu Nikko Line (and had their "K" stickers removed), while sets 8603 to 8612 were retained without Tobu ATS until their retirement from duties on the Den-en-toshi Line.

All trains with "K" stickers have had their ATS system installed or withdrawn from service. The last train with the K sticker, set 8606, was retired in May 2020.

=== Oimachi Line 5-car sets ===
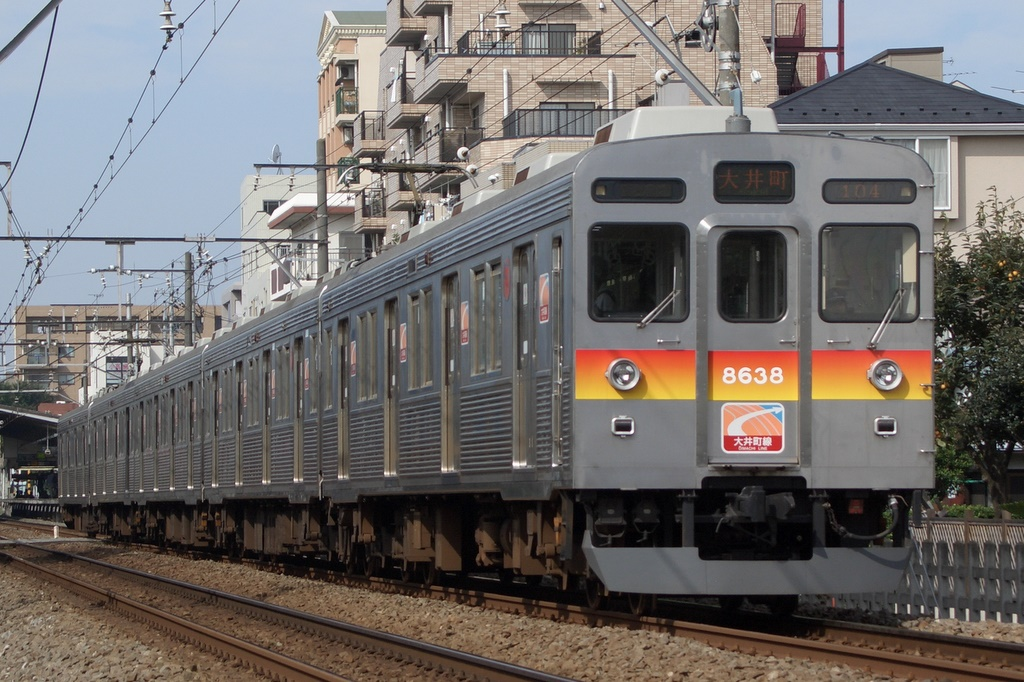
Ōimachi Line 5-car set, October 2006

Oimachi Line five-car sets, based at Nagatsuta Depot, were formed as shown below with four motored ("M") cars and one non-powered trailer ("T") car, and car 1 at the Oimachi end. These sets were withdrawn from service by April 2019.

Car No.	1	2	3	4	5
Designation	M2c	M1	T	M2	M1c
Numbering	DeHa 8600	DeHa 8700	SaHa 8900	DeHa 8800	DeHa 8500

- Cars 2 and 5 were each fitted with one single-arm pantograph.
- Car 2 was designated as a mildly air-conditioned car.

=== Preserved 4-car set ===
The preserved four-car set, 8637, is formed as shown below with Car 1 at the Shibuya end.

Car No.	1	2	3	4
Designation	M2c	M1	T	M1c
Numbering	DeHa 8637	DeHa 8797	SaHa 8980	DeHa 8537

- Cars 2 and 4 are fitted with a lozenge-type pantograph.
- The cab end of car 1 has a blue stripe while the cab end of car 4 has a red stripe.
- Cars 1 and 3 have a wheelchair space.

== Interior ==
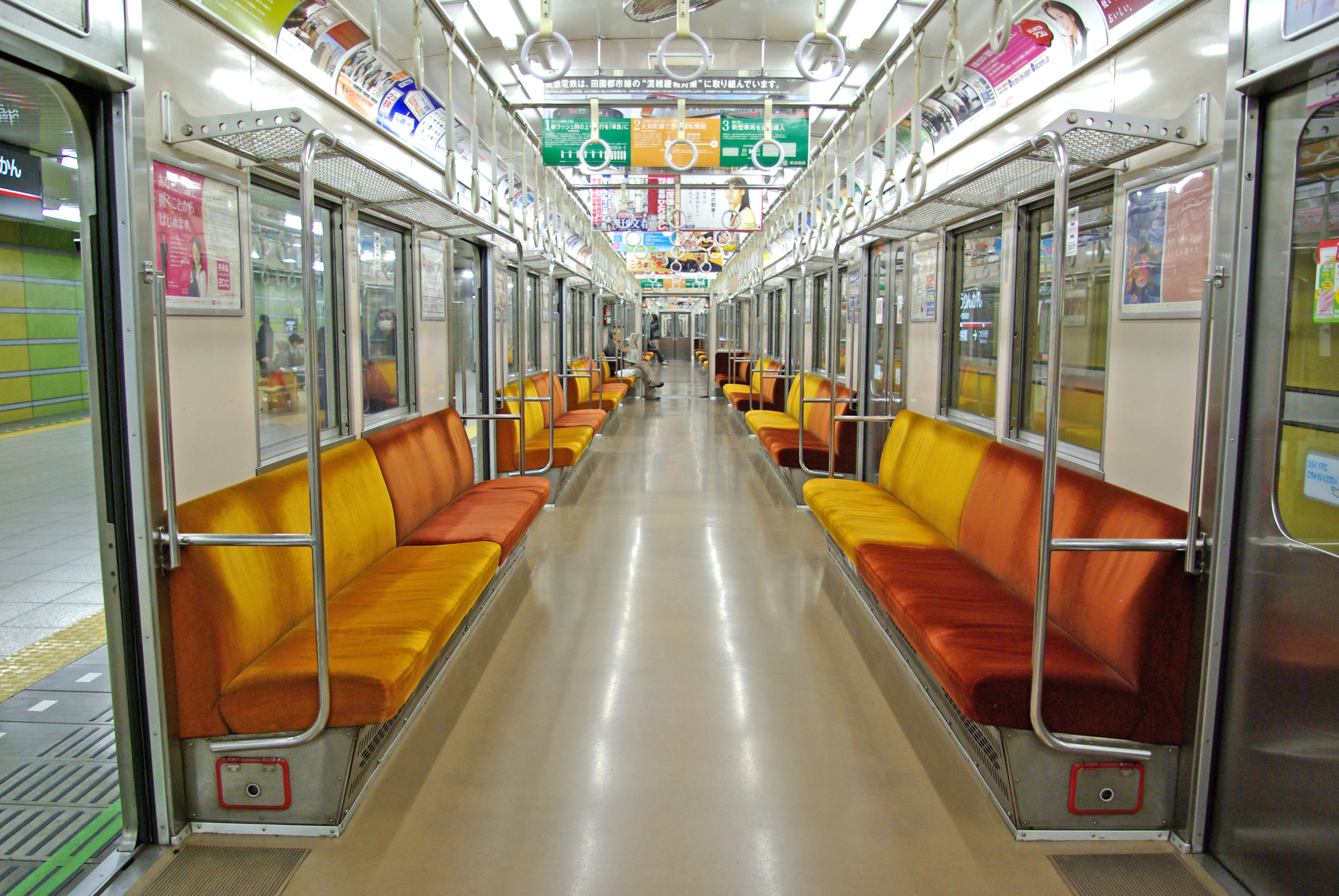
Early style interior of a Den-en-toshi Line set, February 2007

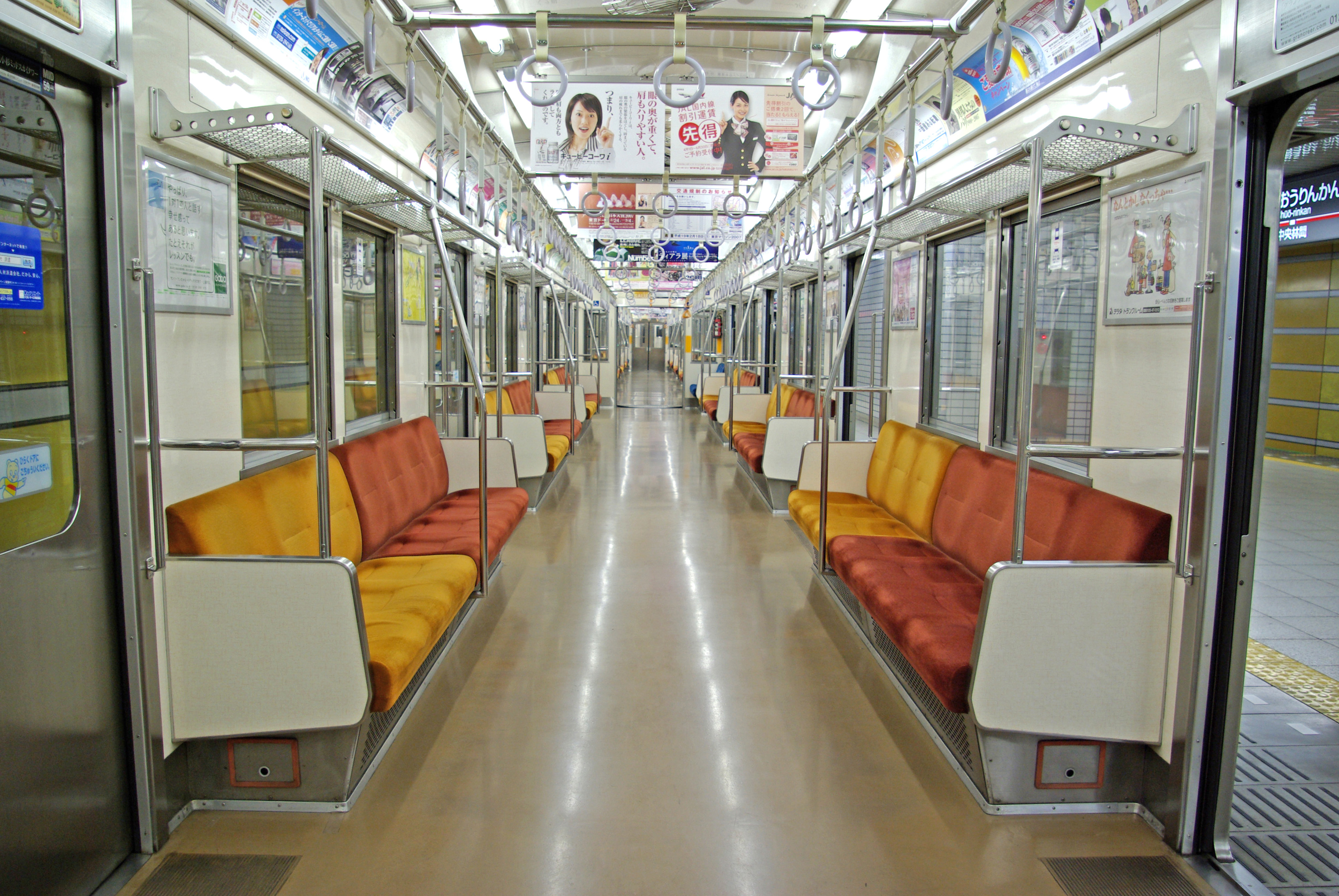
Refurbished interior of a Den-en-toshi Line set, February 2007

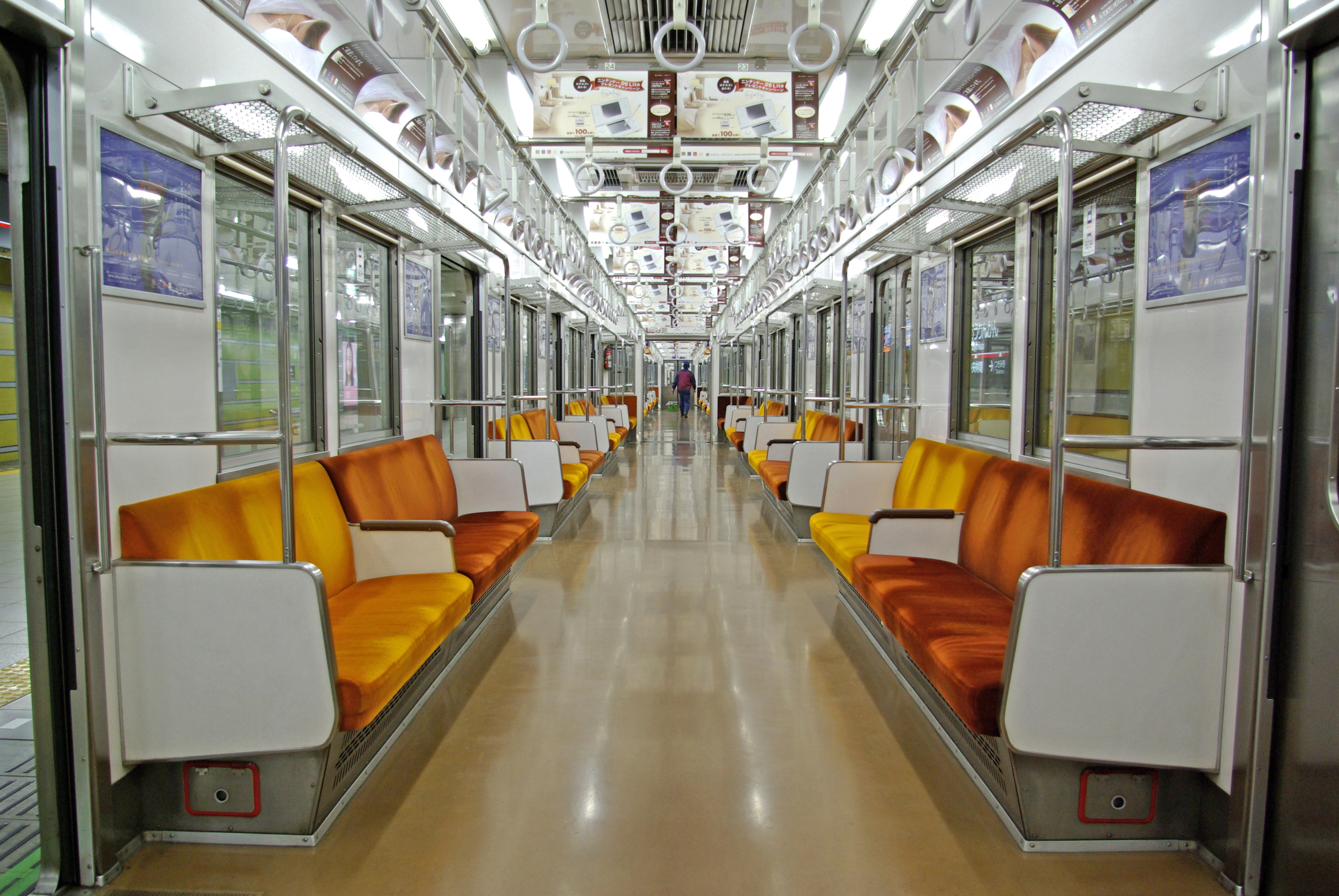
Late style interior of a Den-en-toshi Line set

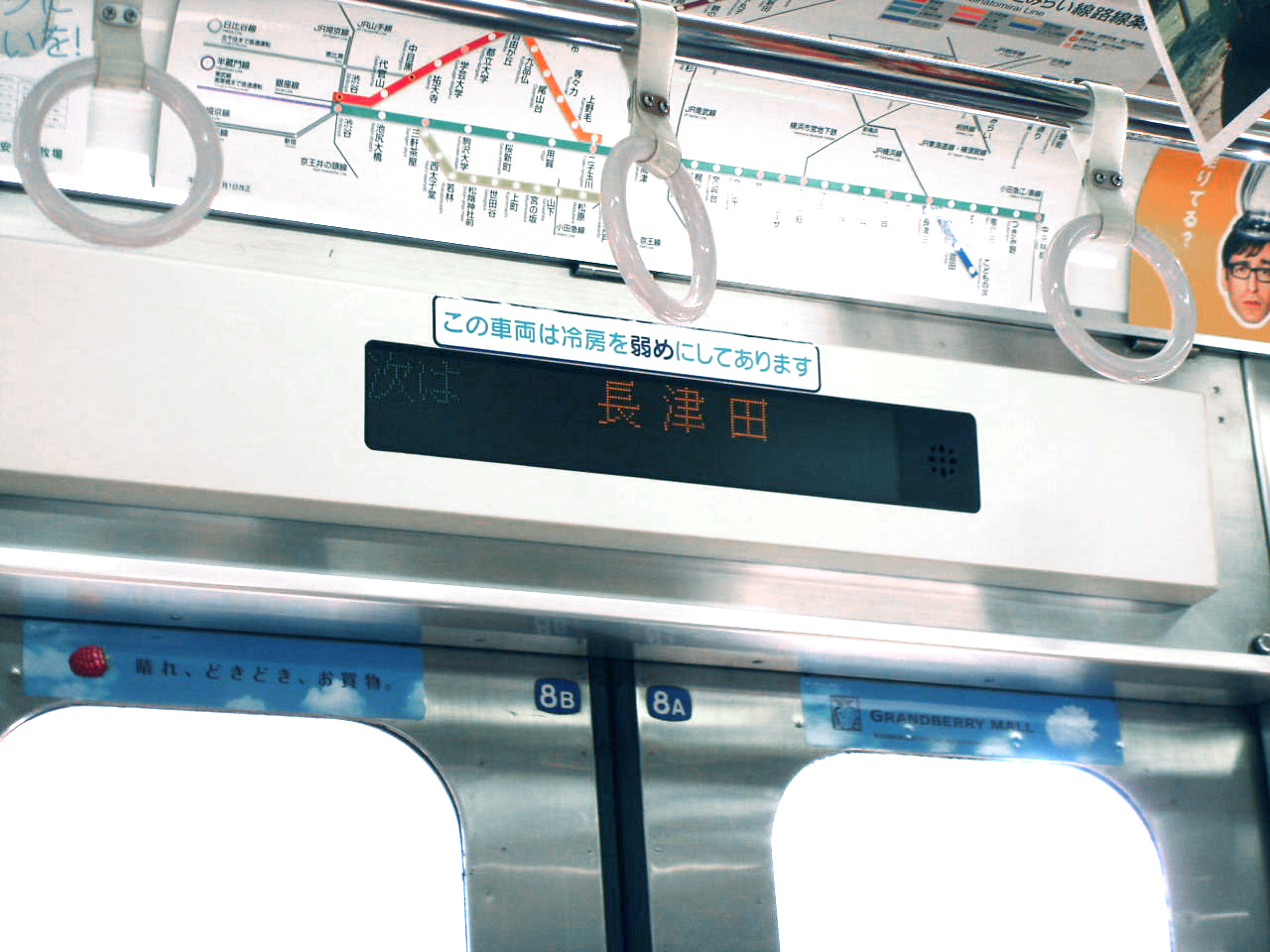
LED passenger information display

== Livery variations ==
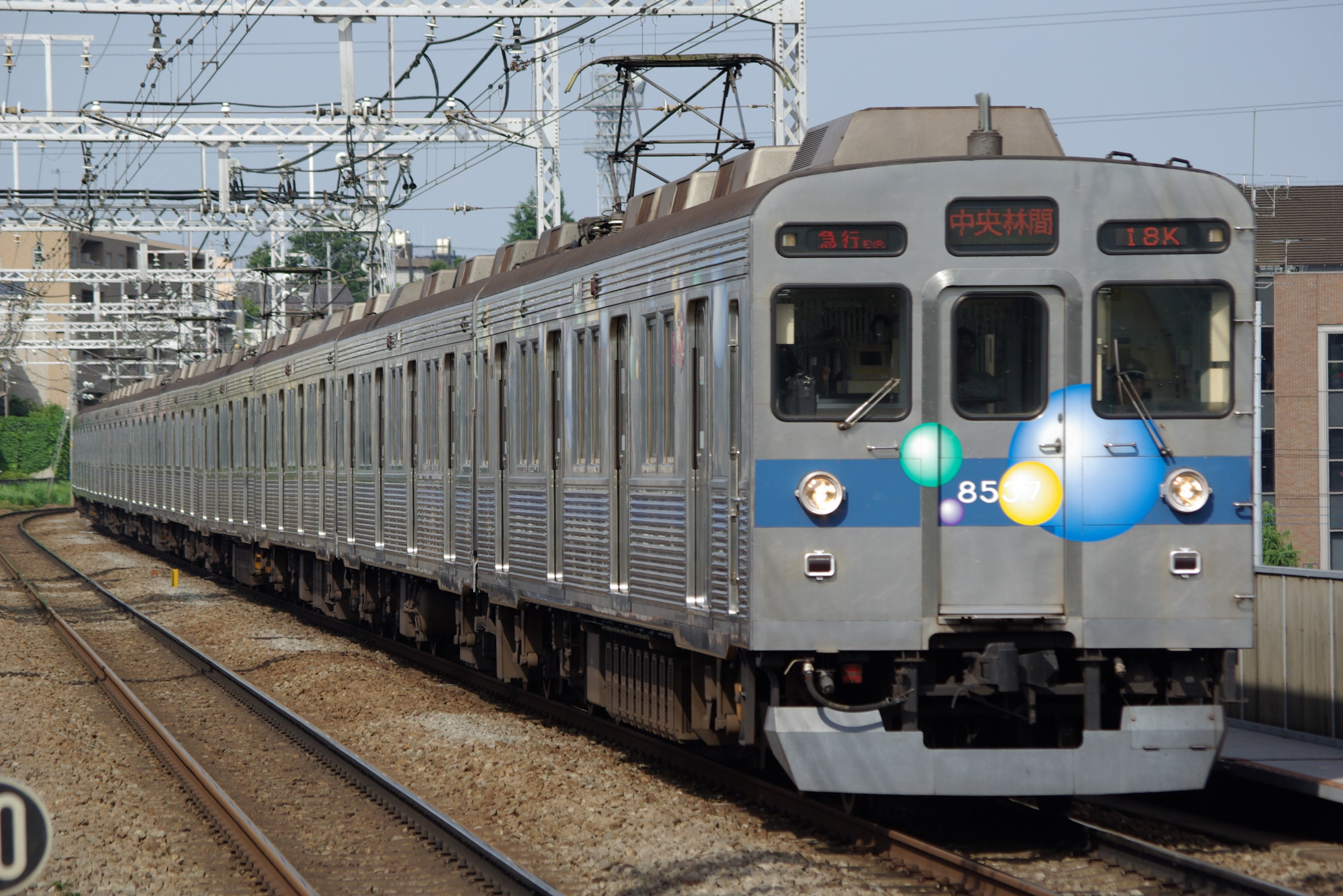
Blue stripe livery, June 2007

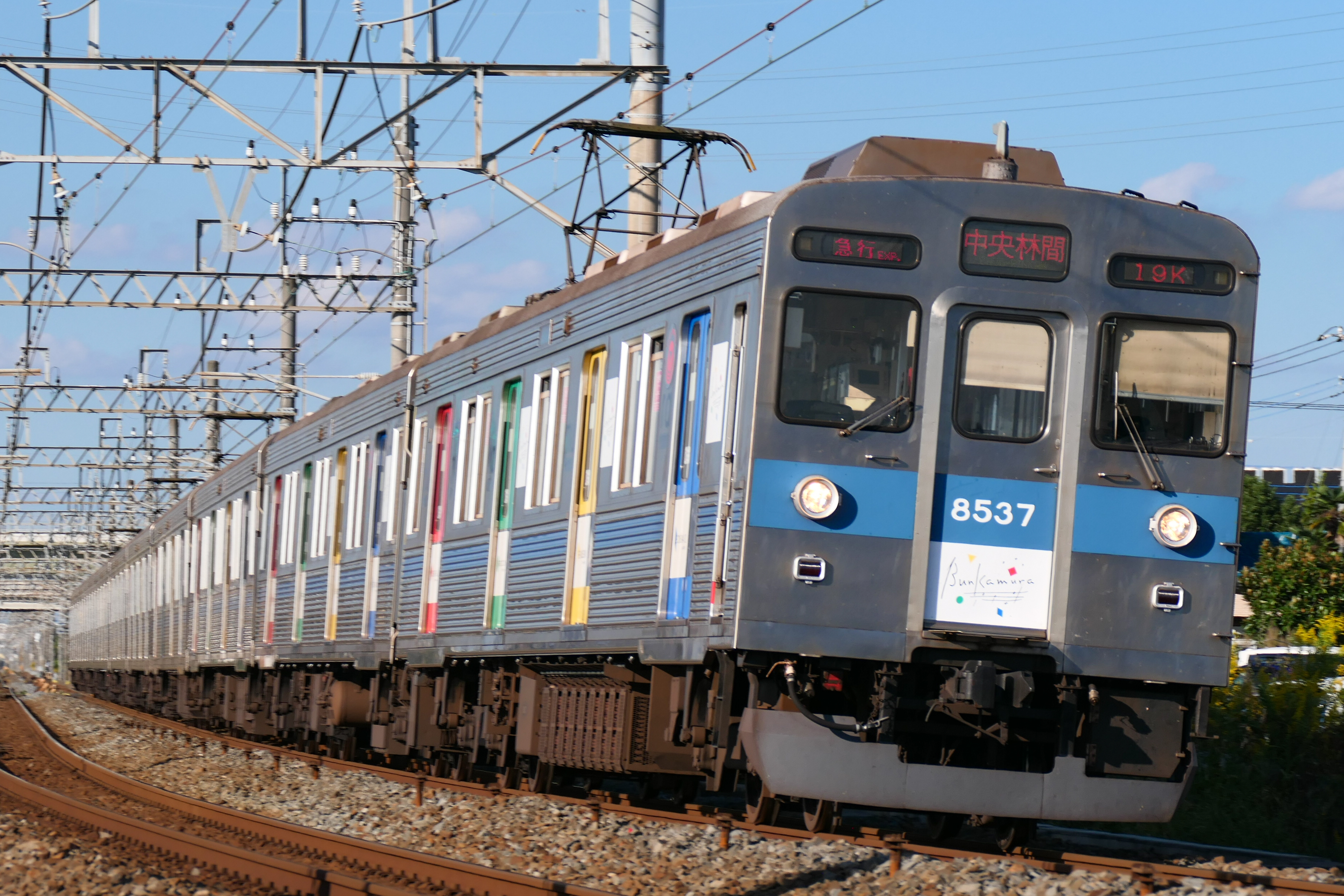
Blue stripe "Bunkamura" livery, October 2021

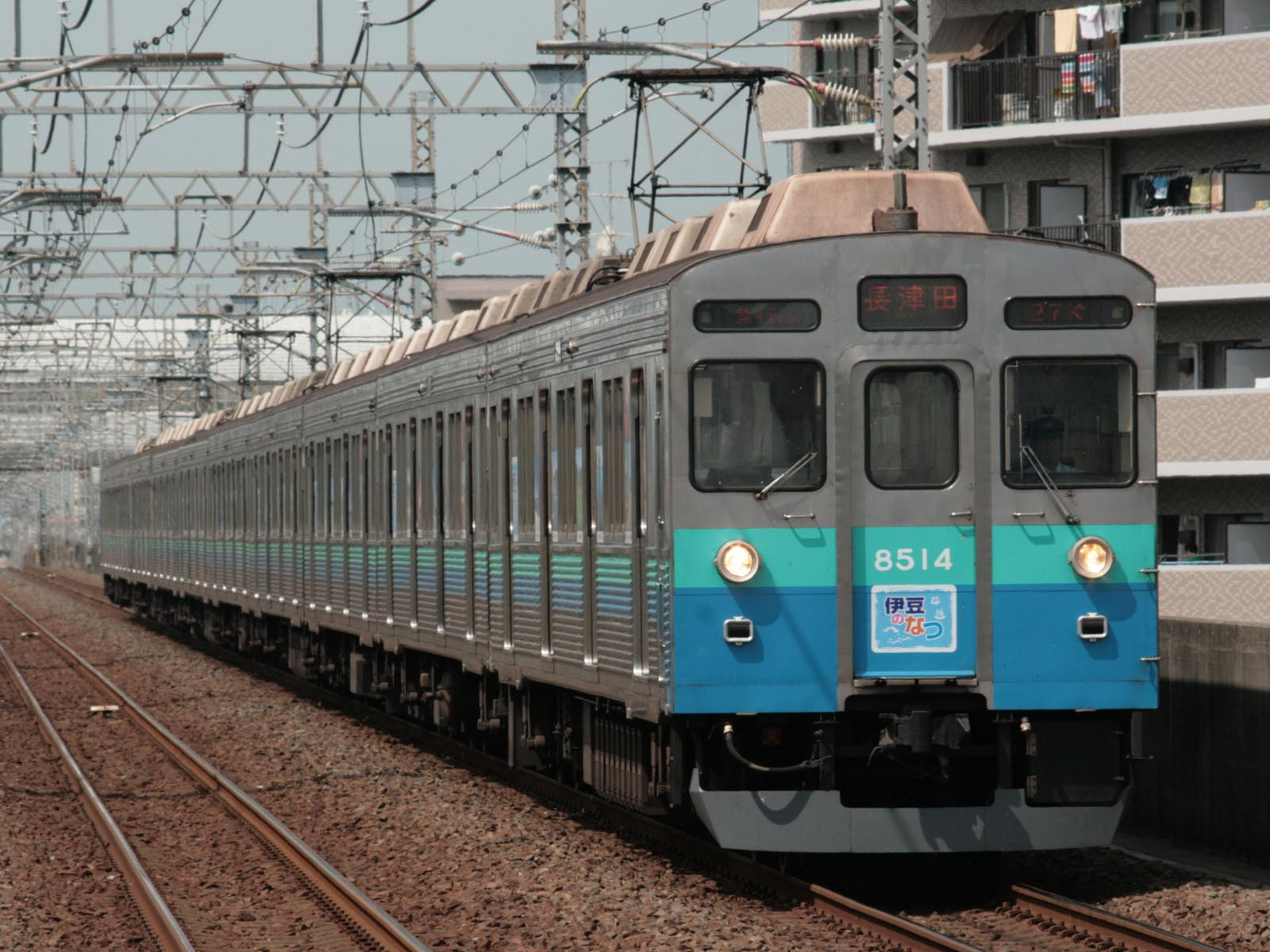
Izu no Natsu Izu Kyuko style livery, August 2012

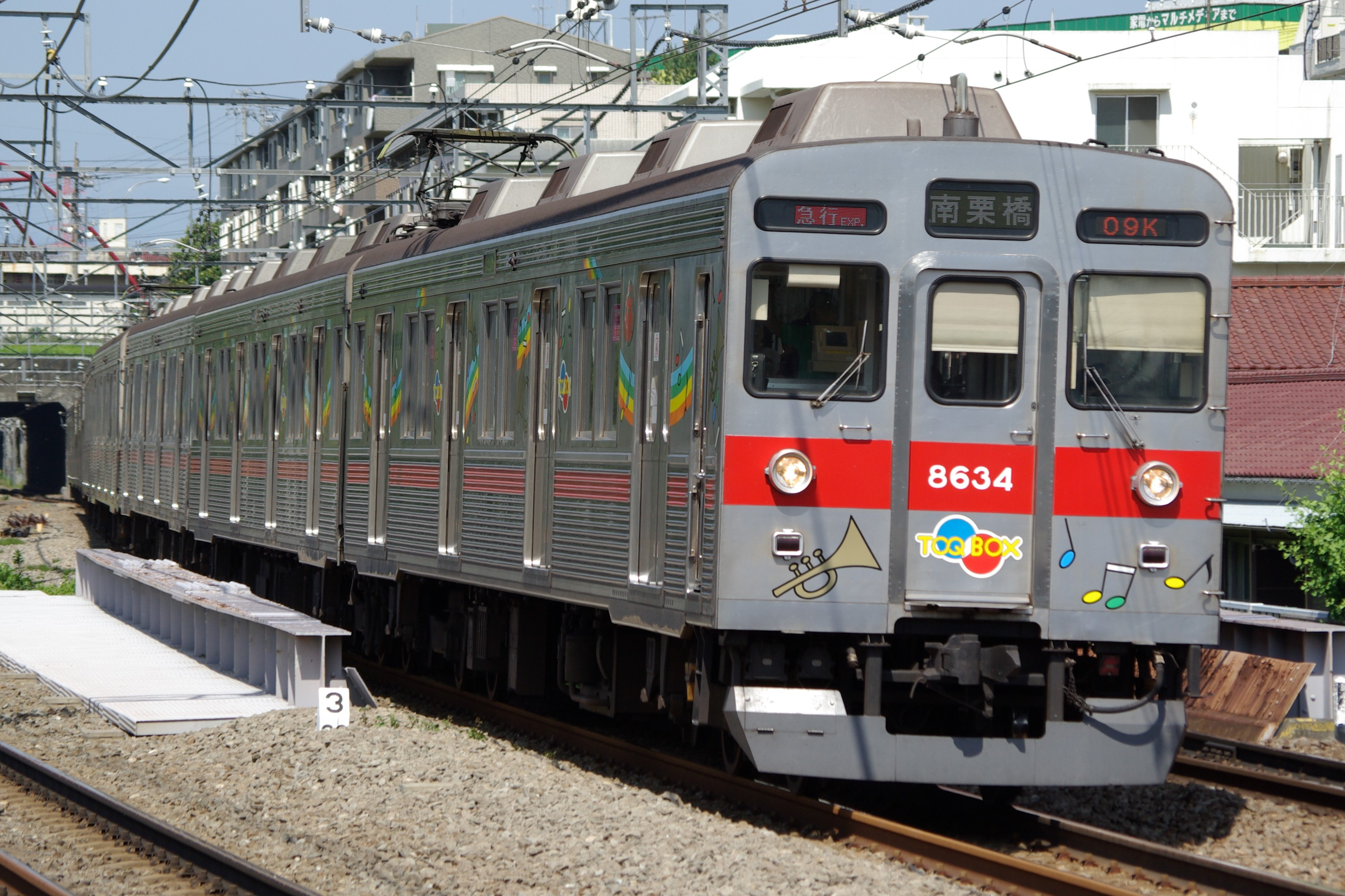
"TOQ-BOX" livery, June 2007

== Resale ==
A number of 8500 series trains have been resold to other operators in Japan and overseas following their withdrawal from Tokyu services.

=== Nagano Electric Railway ===
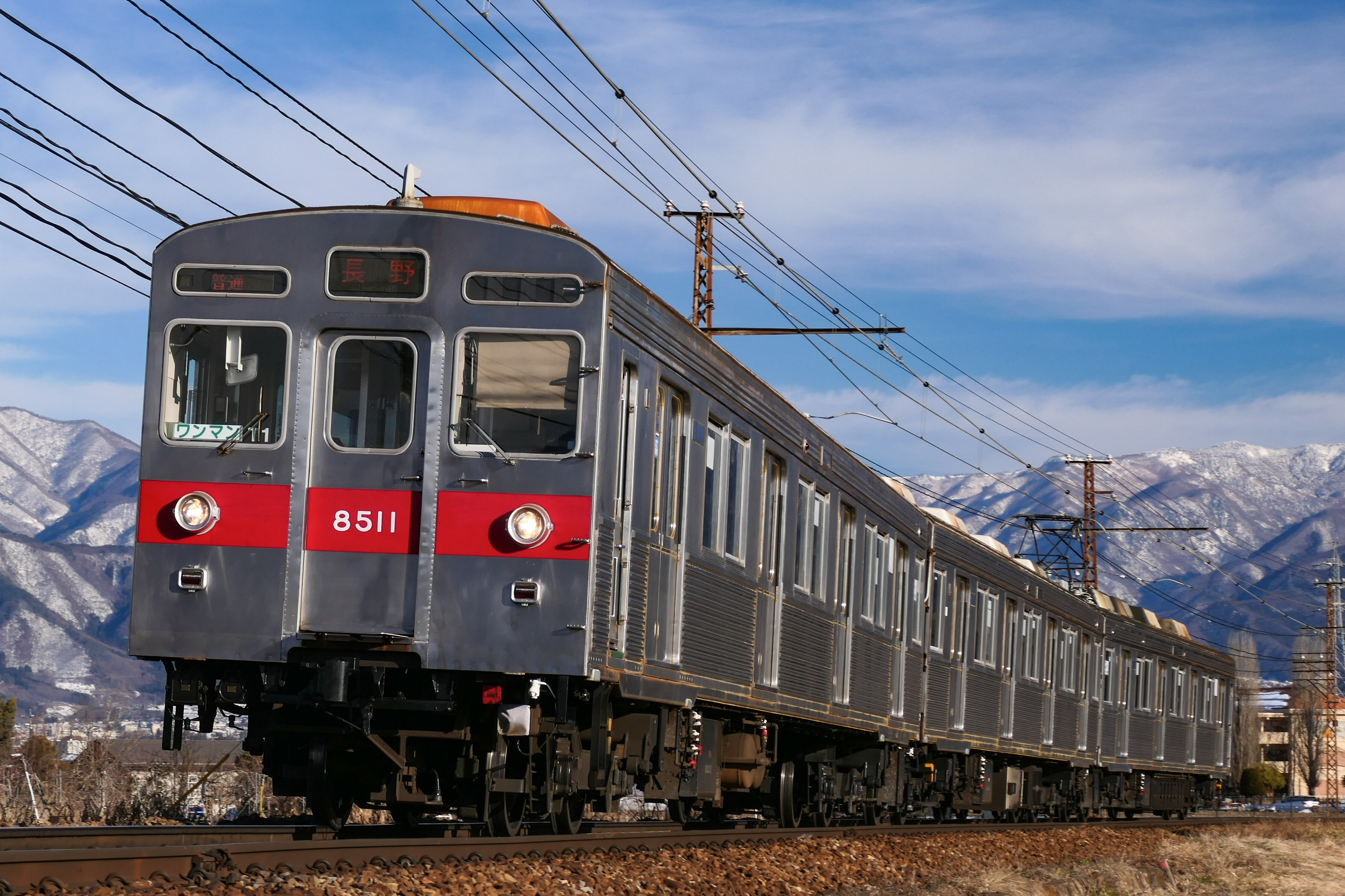
Nagano Electric Railway 8500 series 3-car set, February 2022

Six 3-car sets were sold to the Nagano Electric Railway between 2005 and 2009. These retain the "8500 series" classification.

==== Formation ====
1. DeHa 8500 (M1c)
2. SaHa 8550 (T)
3. DeHa 8510 (M2c)

=== Izukyu Corporation ===
One 8500 series car (DeHa 8723) was sold to Izukyu Corporation in 2006, becoming KuMoHa 8152, and combined with former Tokyu 8000 series cars. It includes transverse seating acquired from Seibu 10000 series trains during refurbishment.

=== Chichibu Railway ===
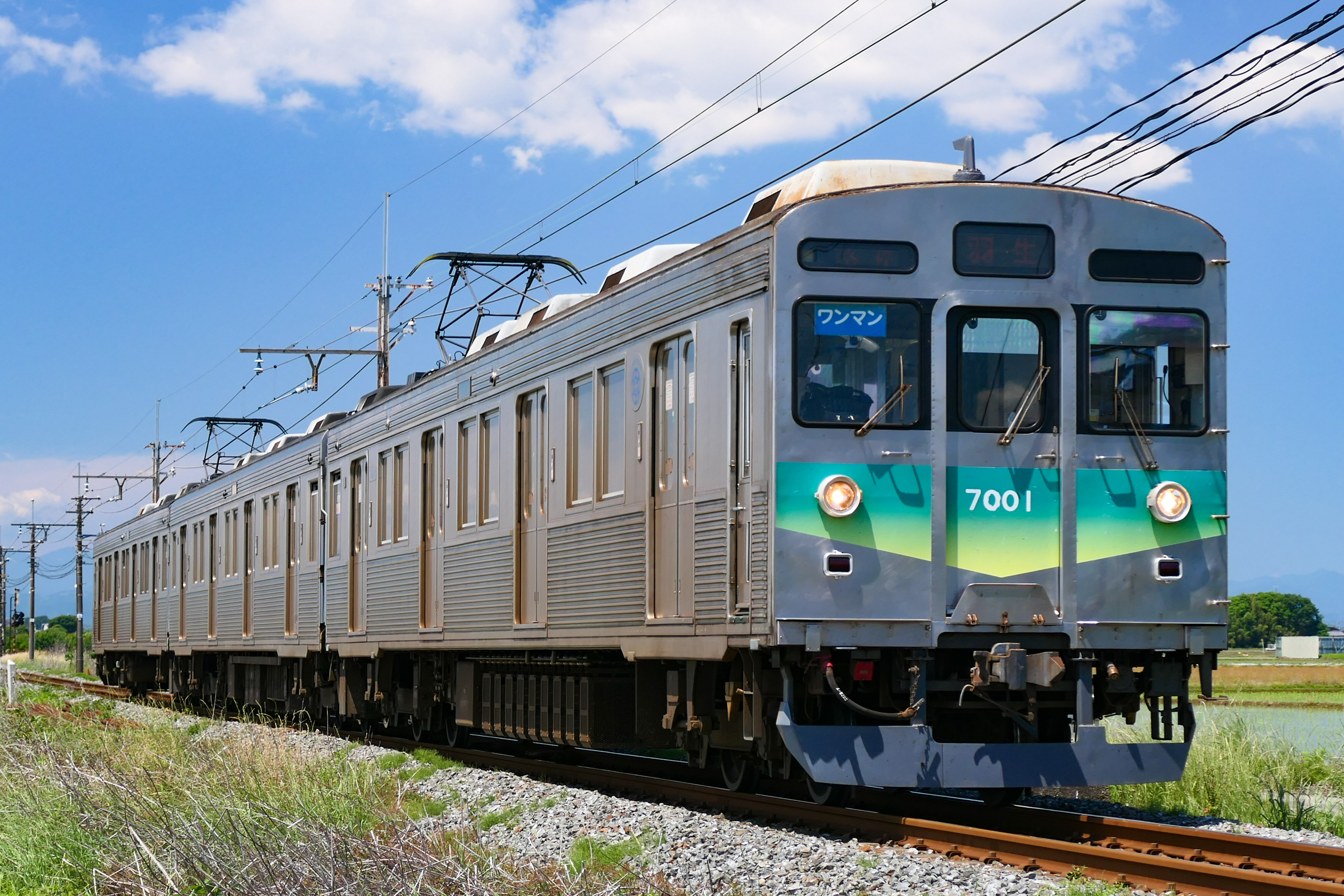
Chichibu Railway 7000 series EMU converted from former Tokyu 8500 series, June 2022

Two 3-car 7000 series sets were formed from cars of set 8609, entering service on the Chichibu Railway in 2009.

=== Indonesia ===
Eight 8-car sets (8604, 8607, 8608, 8610, 8611, 8612, 8613 and 8618) were sold to KRL Jabodetabek in Indonesia between 2006 and 2009 for use on commuter services in the Jakarta area. The sets initially received different color schemes, but were later standardized with the same KA Commuter Jabodetabek red and yellow livery. Set 8618 is the first to be repainted in KAI Commuter paint scheme in February 2021. Set 8612 was retired due to an accident in 2019.

On 9 November 2025, the Tokyu 8500 series was sent from the Depok Depot to Jakarta Kota Station. On the following day, the EMU was exhibited as a mini museum for one week until 16 November 2025 as part of the final run event organized by KAI Commuter together with IRPS (Indonesian Railway Preservation Society). The event was held alongside the 203 series and Tokyo Metro 7000 series, which had also made their final runs on 11 November 2025. On the night of 16 November 2025, the Tokyu 8500 series returned to the Depok Depot, marking the end of its operational service in Indonesia.

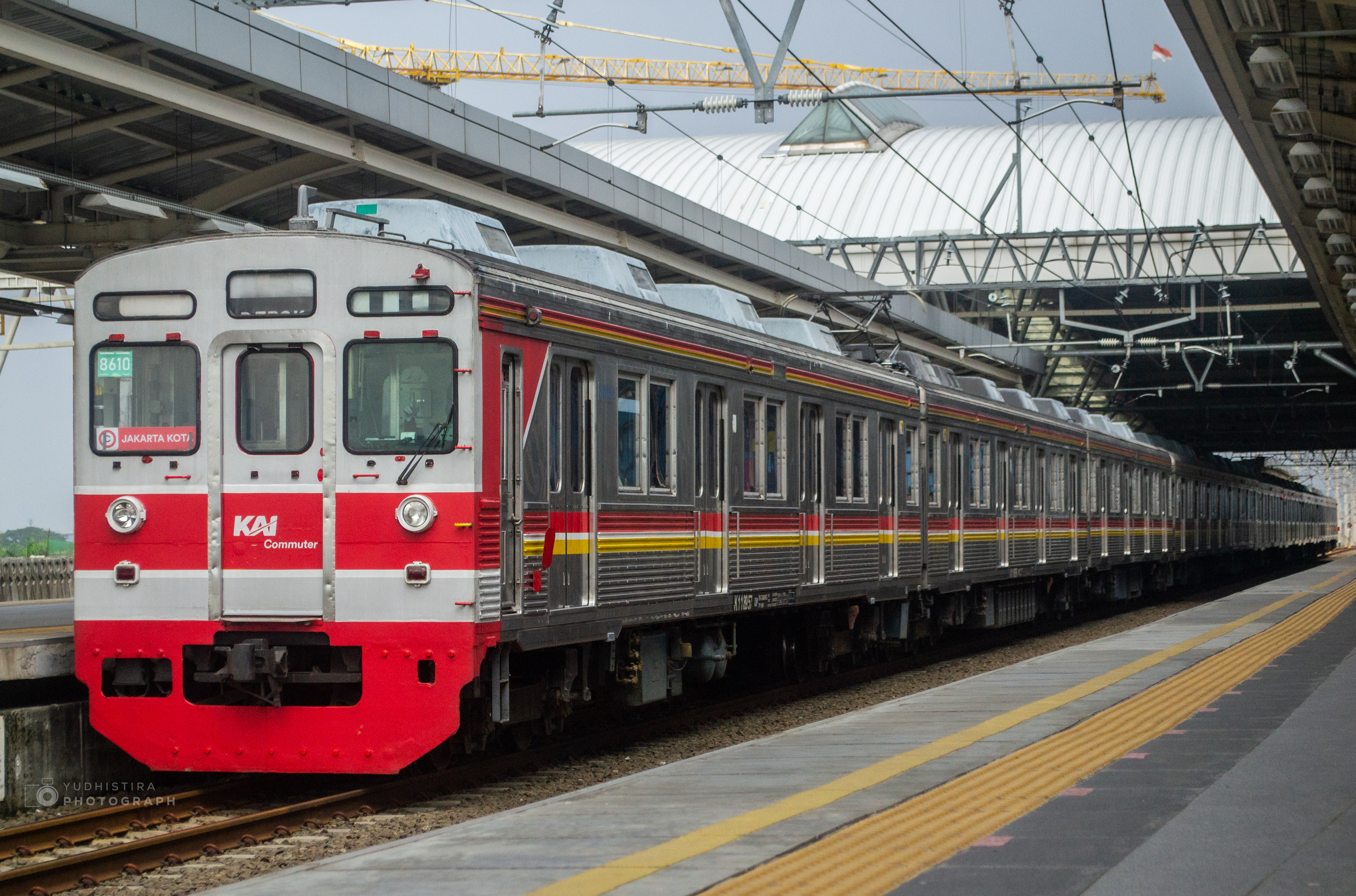
Former Tokyu 8500 series EMU set 8610 on an afternoon commuter service in Indonesia, June 2023

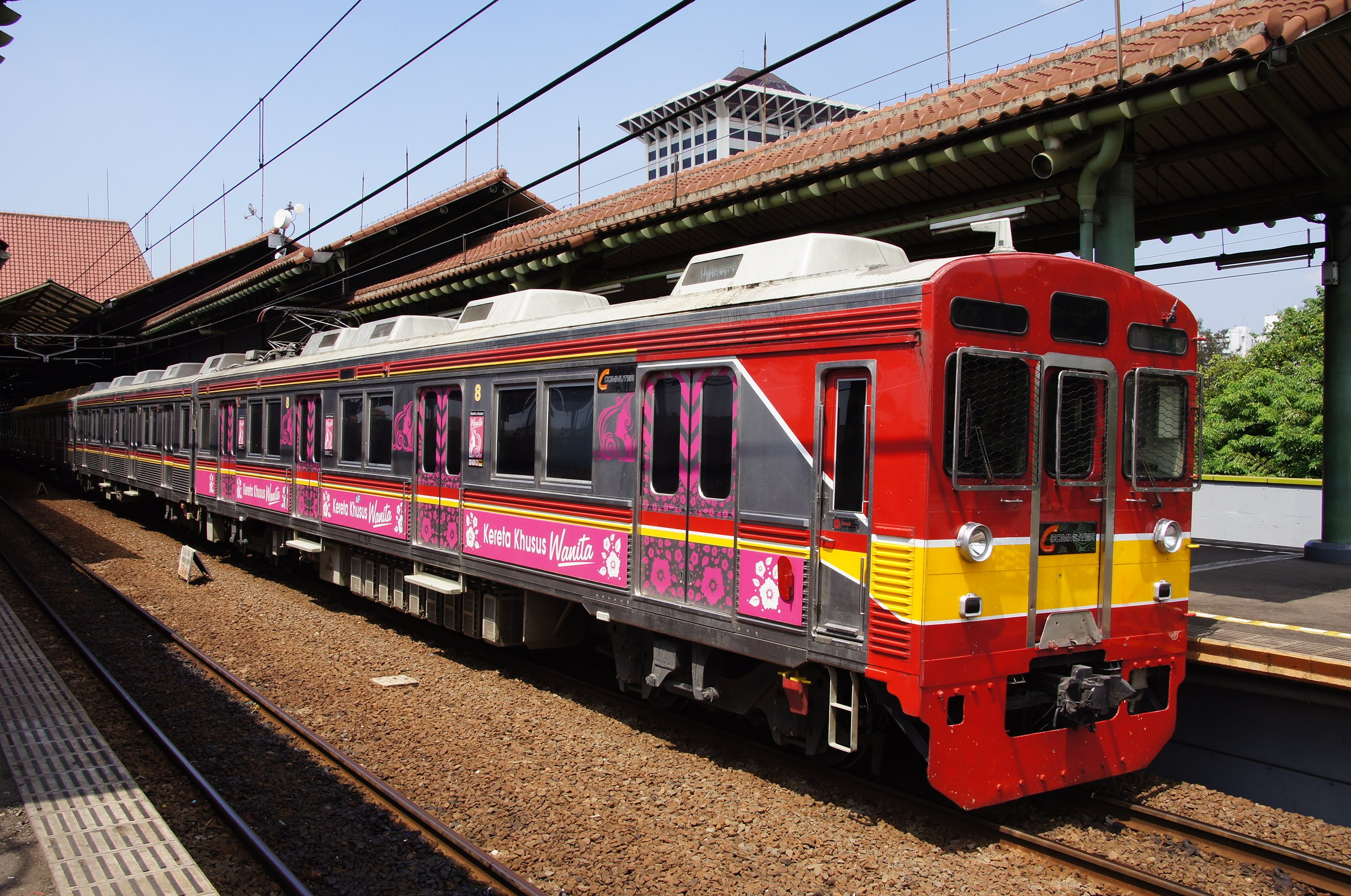
Former Tokyu 8500 series EMU set 8613 on a KRL Jabotabek commuter service in Jakarta, November 2011

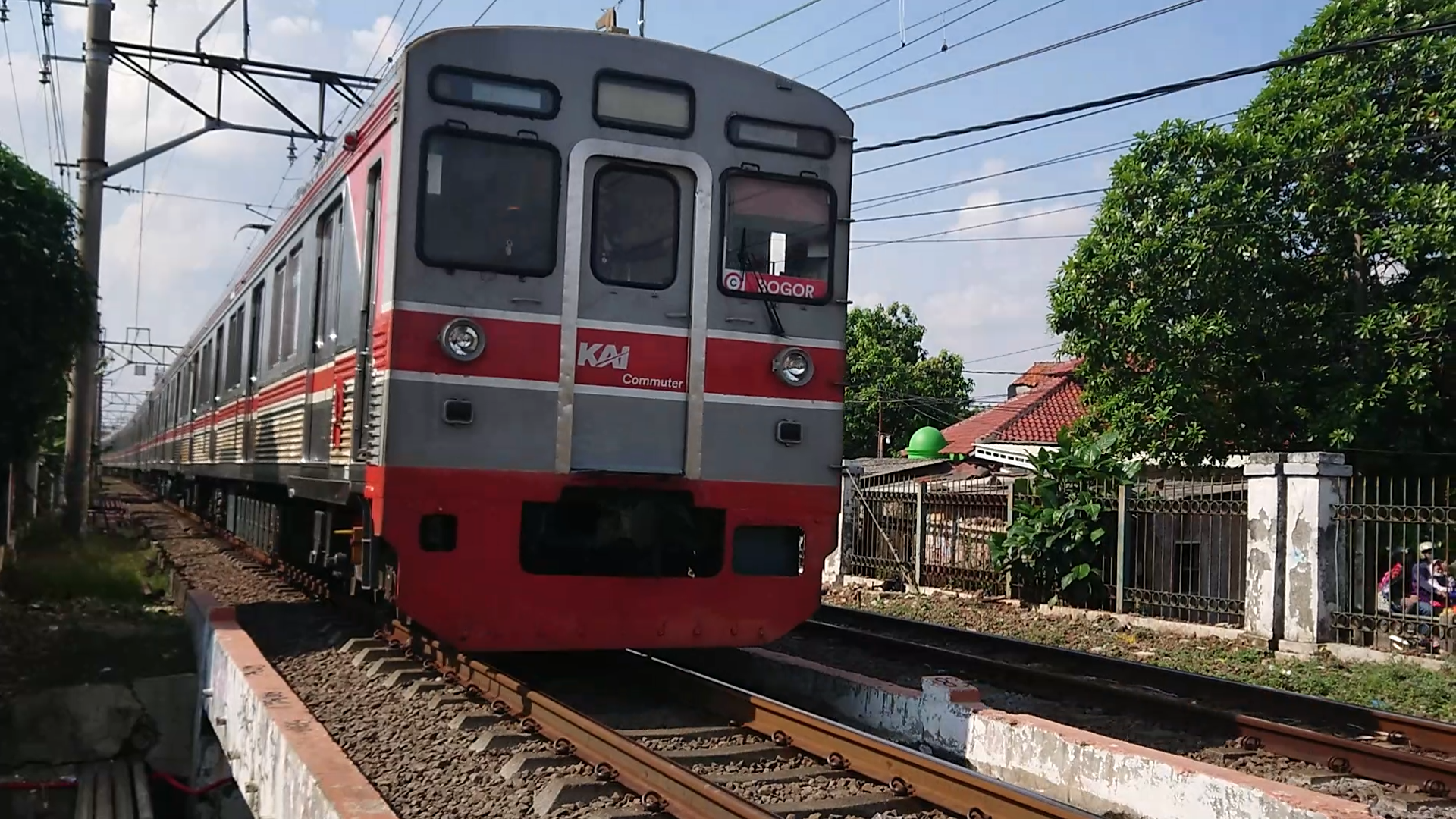
Former Tokyu 8500 series EMU set 8618 with the new KAI Commuter livery, May 2022

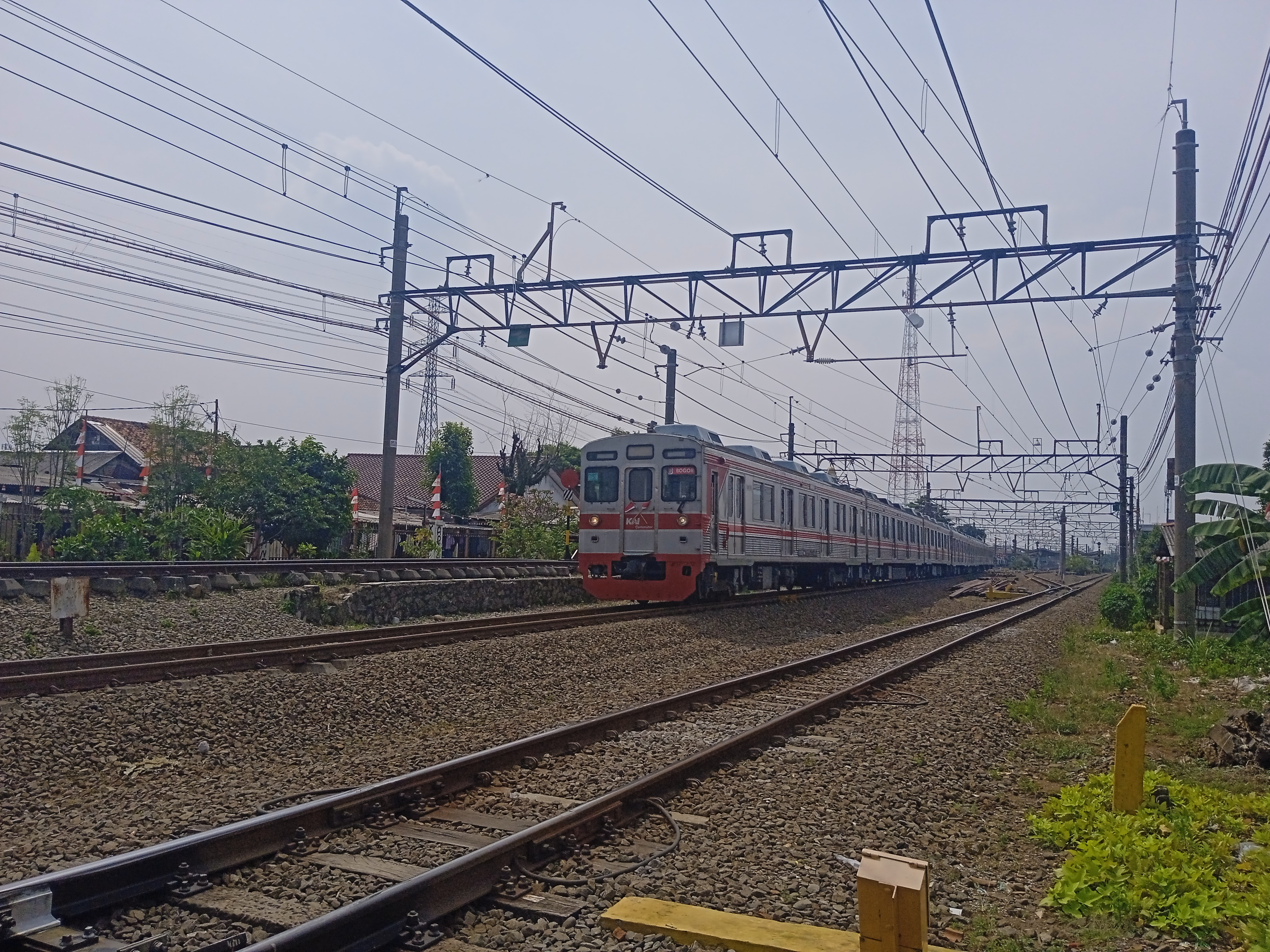
Tokyu 8500 set 8618F departed from Depok station, Indonesia

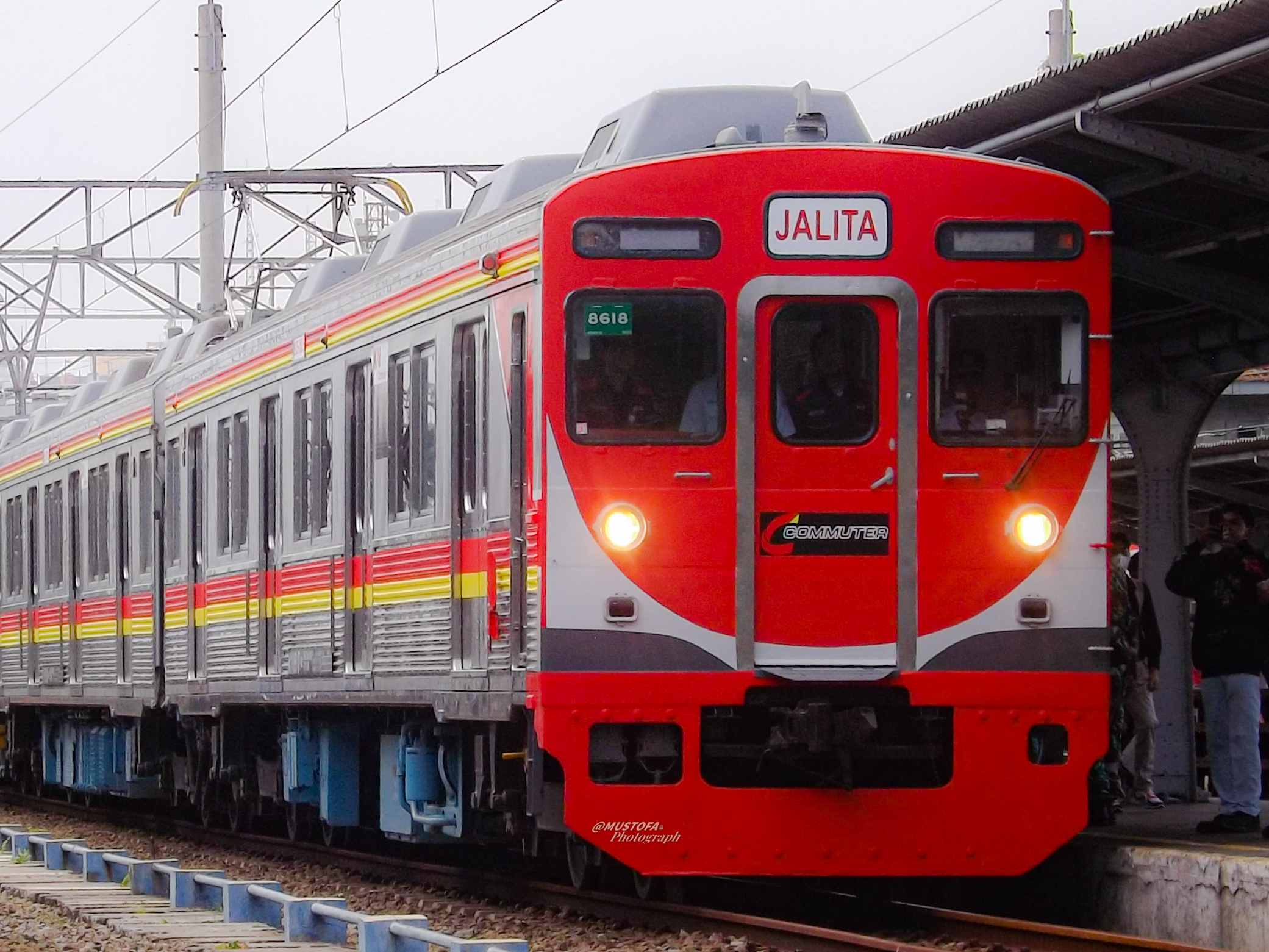
Set 8618F with 'JALITA' Livery

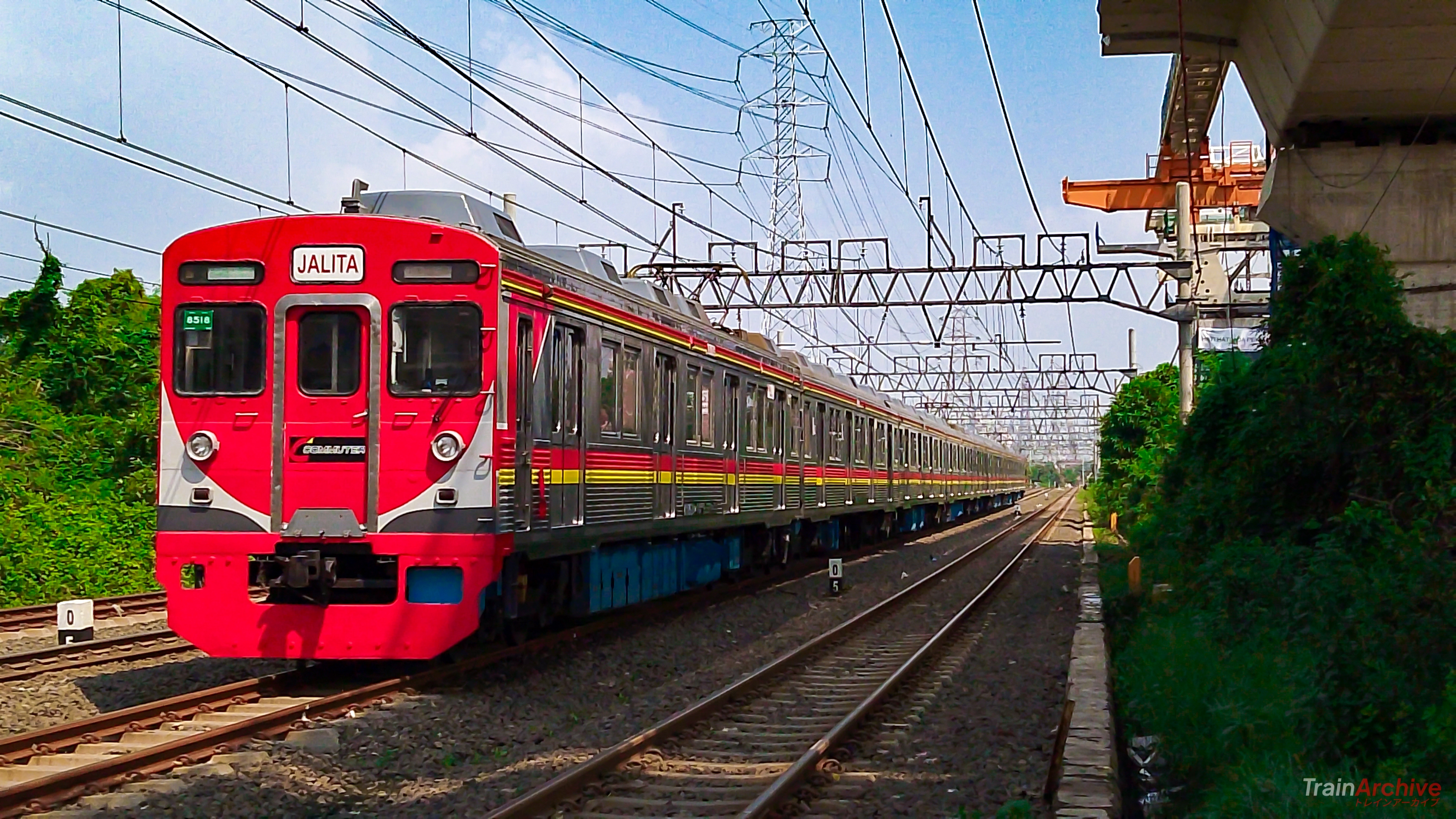
Tokyu 8500 series set 8618 with "JALITA" livery serving Tanjung Priok Line, Taken on July 10, 2025

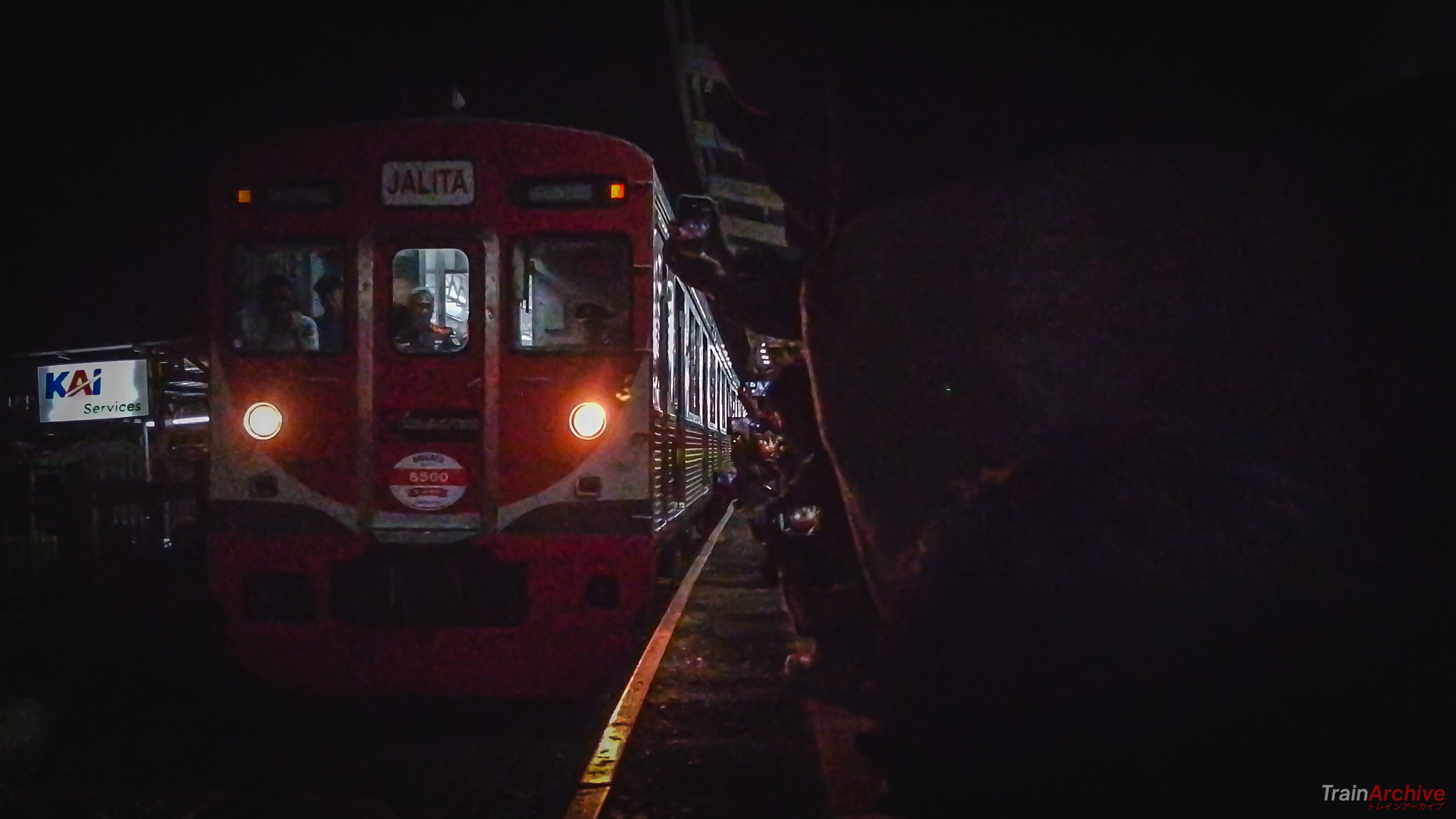
Tokyu 8500 series 8618F entering Depok Station before heading to Depok Depot as its last run.
