= Meitetsu KiHa 8500 series =

Japanese train type

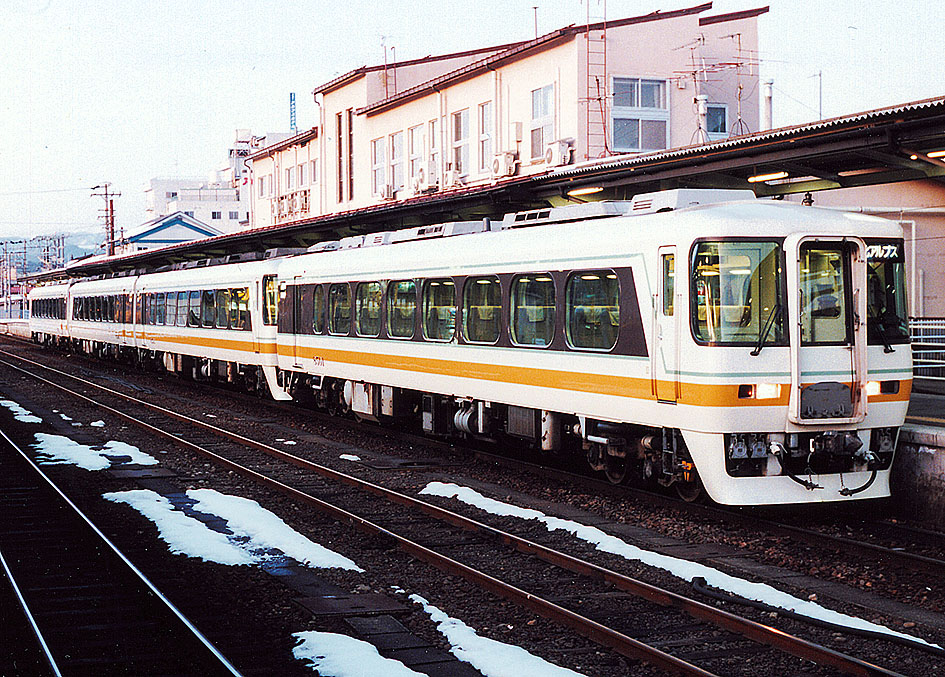
- A KiHa 8500 series train in 1992
- In service: 1991 – 2001 (Meitetsu); 2002 – 2010 (Aizu Railway); 2016 – Present (Sabah State Railway)
- Manufacturer: Nippon Sharyo
- Replaced: KiHa 8000 series
- Constructed: 1991
- Entered service: 16 March 1991
- Scrapped: 2007
- Number built: 5 vehicles
- Number in service: 2 vehicles
- Number preserved: 2 vehicles
- Number scrapped: 1 vehicle (8555)
- Formation: Single car
- Fleet numbers: 8501–8504, 8555
- Capacity: 60 (end cars); 68 (intermediate cars)
- Operators: Nagoya Railroad, Aizu Railway, Sabah State Railway
- Lines served: Meitetsu Nagoya Main Line, Takayama Main Line

Specifications
- Car body construction: Steel
- Car length: 20,800 mm (68 ft 3 in)
- Width: 2,740 mm (9 ft 0 in)
- Height: 3,640 mm (11 ft 11 in)
- Doors: One per side
- Maximum speed: 120 km/h (75 mph)
- Prime mover: Cummins NTA-855-R1
- Transmission: C-DW14
- Bogies: ND-719
- Braking system: Air
- Safety systems: Meitetsu ATS, ATS-S
- Track gauge: 1,067 mm (3 ft 6 in)

The Meitetsu KiHa 8500 series (名鉄キハ8500系) is a limited express diesel multiple unit operated by Meitetsu (Nagoya Railroad) in Japan from 1991 to 2001, and by Aizu Railway from 2002 to 2010. Since October 2016, it has been in operation on the Sabah State Railway in Sabah, Malaysia.

== History ==
The trains were manufactured in 1990 to replace aging KiHa 8000 series diesel railcars that entered service in 1965, in light of newer diesel railcars being manufactured by various companies.

Five cars were manufactured by Nippon Sharyo in 1991 based on the KiHa 85 series built by the same company and used by JR Central, and entered service the same year, replacing all remaining KiHa 8000 series diesel railcars on Kita Alps services. When they were in service with Meitetsu, they were used on the Kita Alps and Hida services.

However, in 2000, a high-speed bus service connecting Nagoya Station and Takayama Station was introduced. With the introduction of the bus service, the ridership of the Kita Alps service was halved, and Meitetsu saw that there was no point keeping the five cars due to inefficiency when compared with the bus service. Due to this, all five cars were retired from service on 30 September 2001, the same day when the Kita Alps service was abolished.

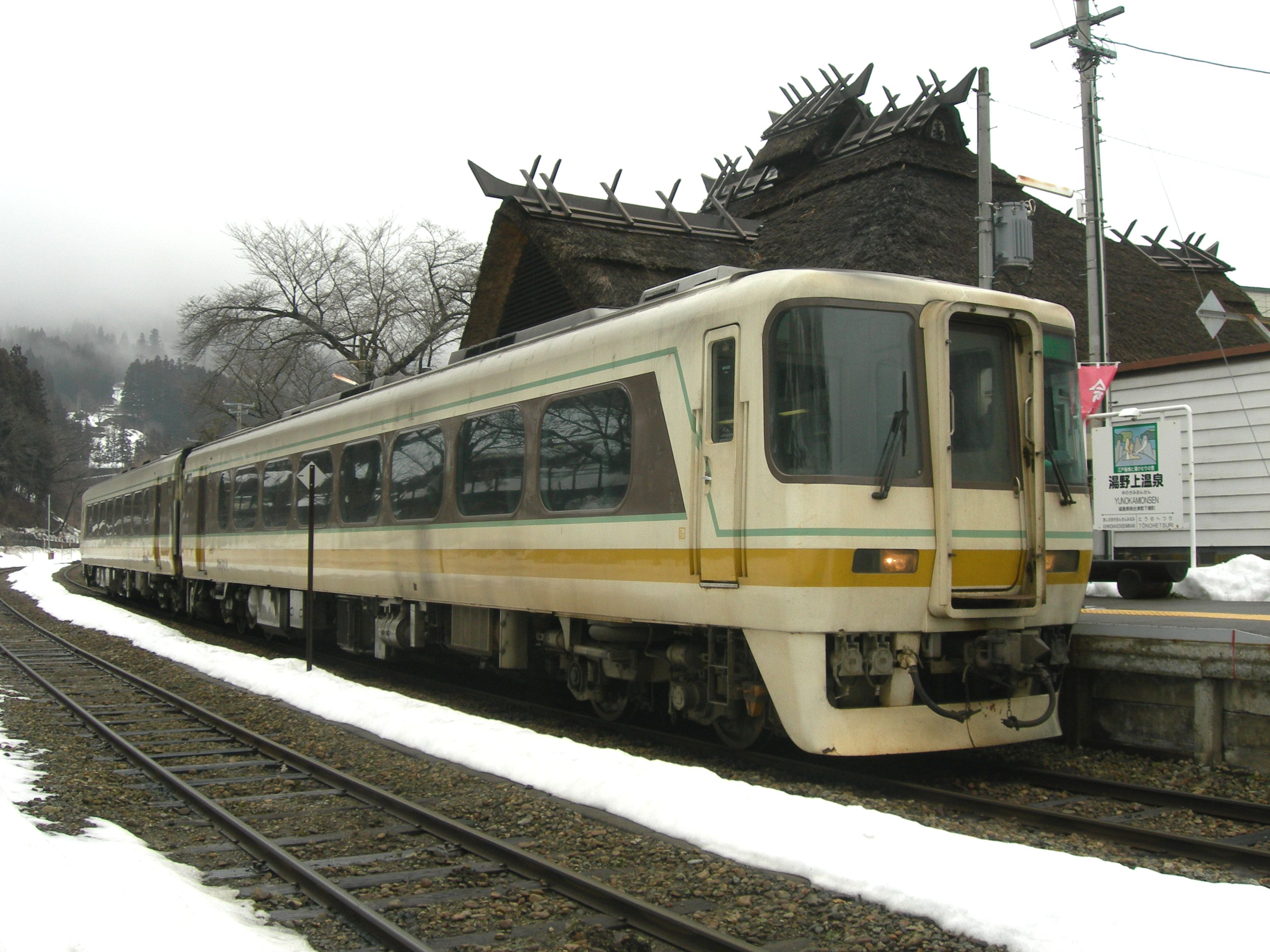
KiHa 8500 on Aizu Railway

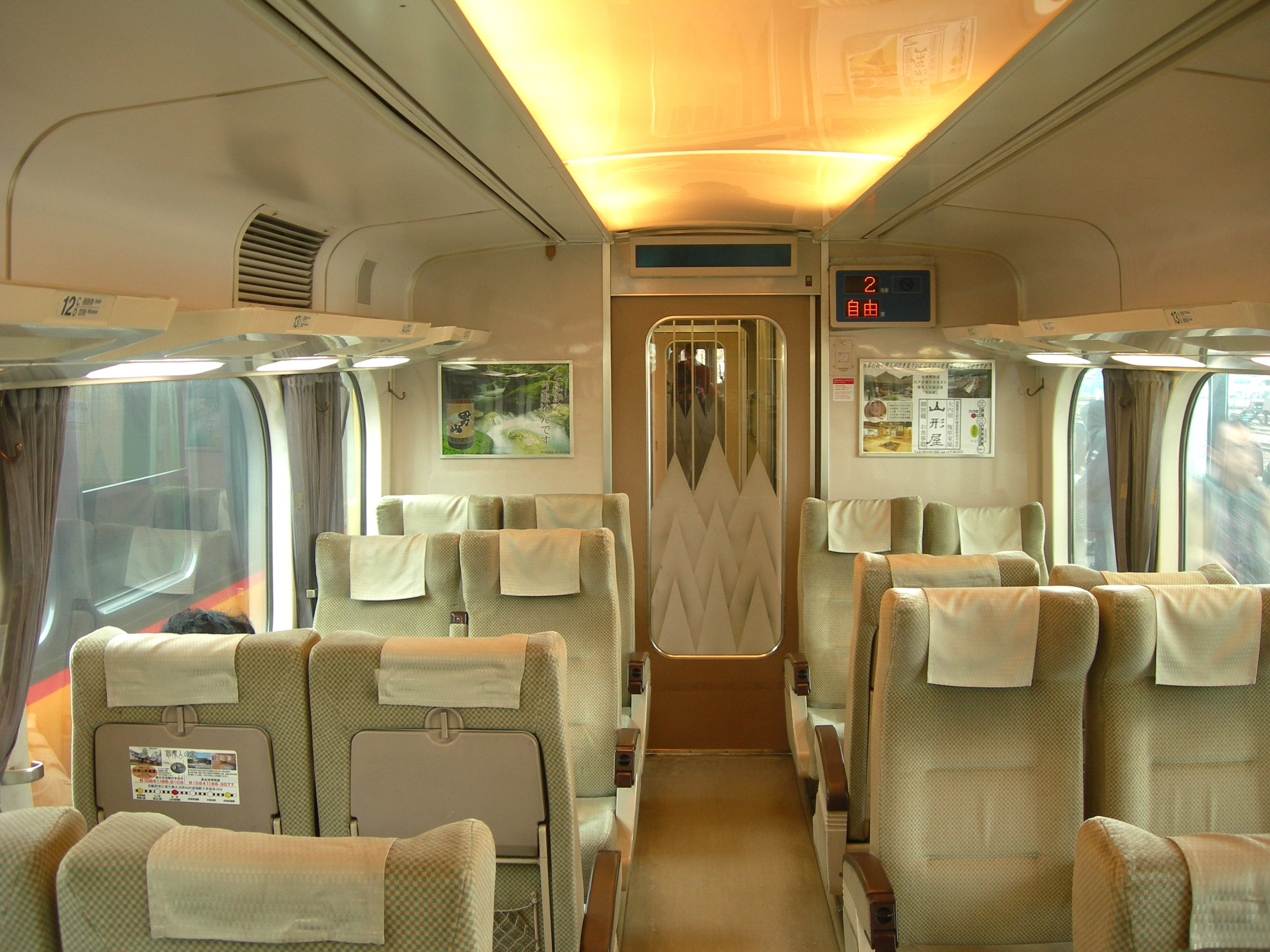
Interior of KiHa 8500 on Aizu Railway

All five cars were later sold to the Aizu Railway that same year, and began operations on the Aizu Railway on 23 March 2002. As the KiHa 8500 series were designed for high-speed operation, problems with the KiHa 8500 series started to surface when in service on the Aizu Railway, which resulted in deterioration of parts due to the frequent station stops the cars had to make. As such, the cars were retired on 30 May 2010 and replaced by newer AT-700 series railcars the same day. The cars were actually supposed to make a special final run on 26 and 27 March 2011 as part of an event, but said event was cancelled due to the Tōhoku earthquake and tsunami.

== Overseas operations ==
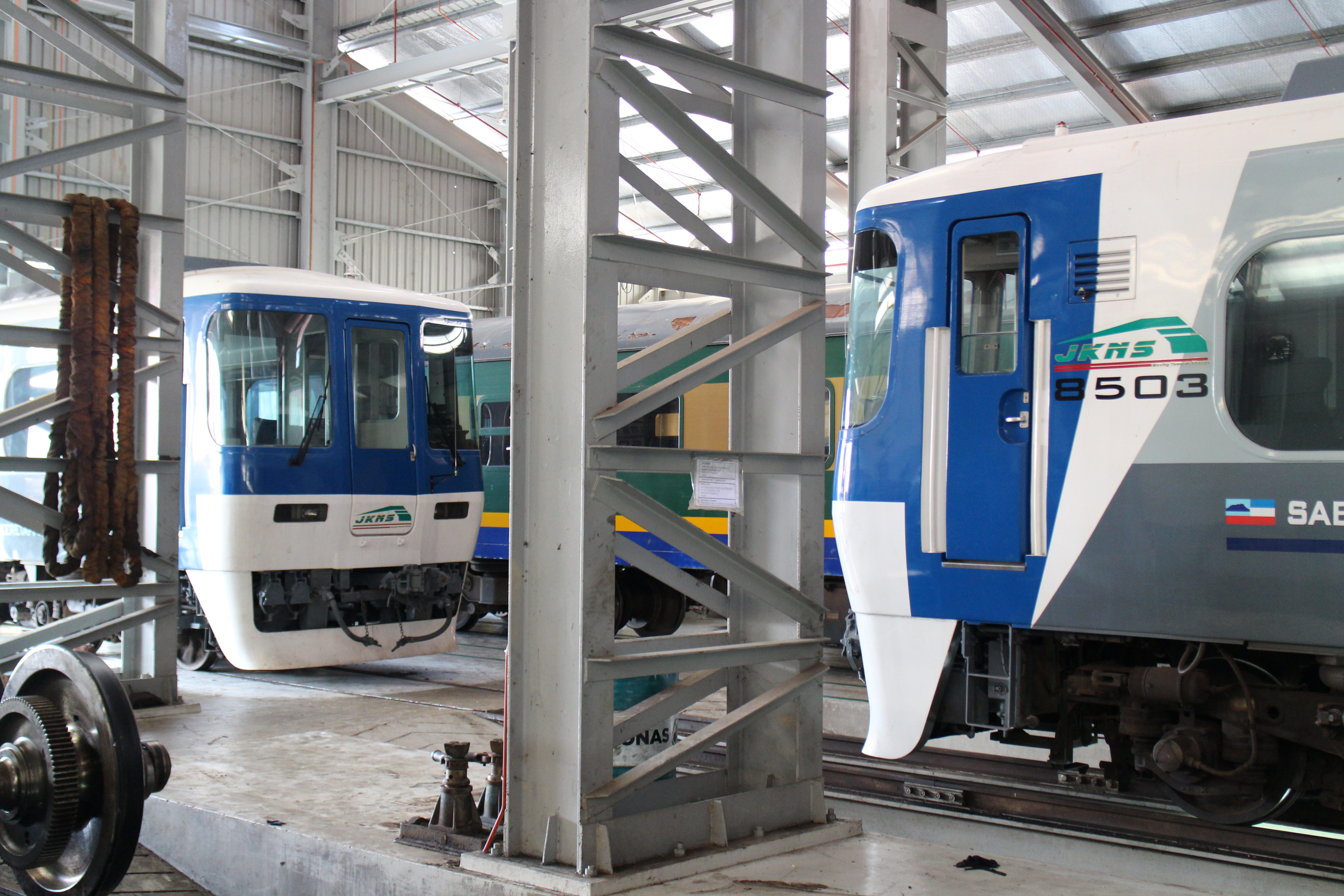
8502 and 8503 on Sabah State Railway in Malaysia

Cars 8502 and 8503 were shipped to Sabah State Railway in mid-August 2015. Both cars were repainted and refurbished from February to March 2016. 8502 entered service on 27 October 2016 and is used on Sabah State Railway's Kelas Pertama ("first class" in Malay) services. 8503 is slated to begin operation in fiscal 2017.

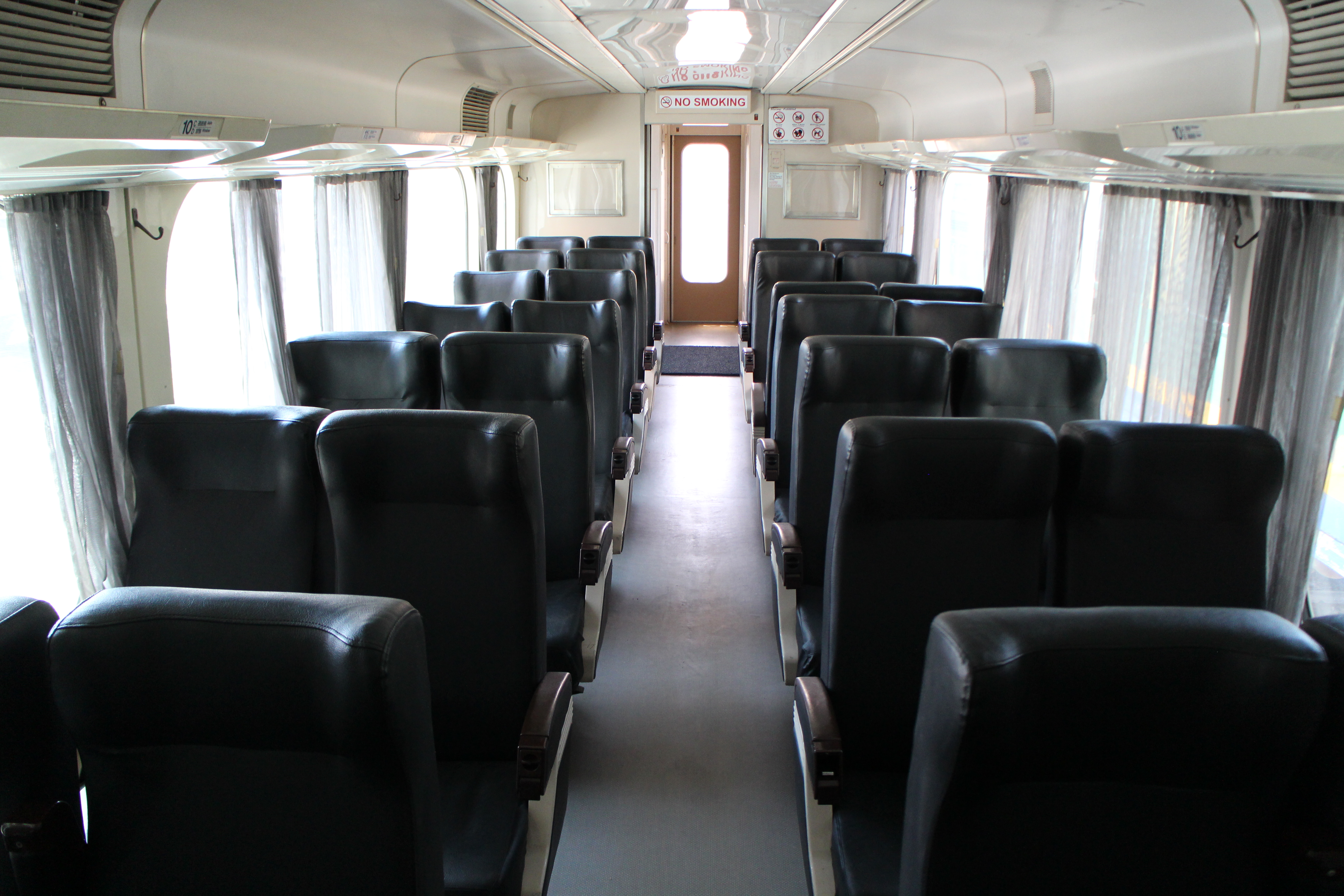
Interior of the Sabah State Railway KiHa 8500

== Preserved examples ==
Cars 8501 and 8504 are preserved in operational condition by the Nakagawa Seiryū Railway Preservation Society in Nasukarasuyama, Tochigi.

== Individual cars ==
The 5 individual cars that were built are as follows:

=== KiHa 8501 ===
This car was facing the Toyohashi end and is equipped with a toilet and washroom. This car has been preserved.

=== KiHa 8502 ===
This car was facing the Takayama end and is equipped with a toilet and washroom. This car is in service with the Sabah State Railway.

=== KiHa 8503 ===
This car is practically identical to car 8501, but is only inserted into a trainset when required. This car is in service with the Sabah State Railway.

=== KiHa 8504 ===
This car was an additional car meant to face the Takayama end, and is equipped with vending machines and a public telephone. Like car 8503, it is only inserted into a trainset when required. This car has been preserved.

=== KiHa 8555 ===
This was an intermediate car equipped with vending machines and a public telephone. This car has been scrapped as of 31 March 2007.

== Notes ==
This article incorporates information from the corresponding article in the Japanese Wikipedia.
